= Art theft =

Stealing of paintings or sculptures from museums

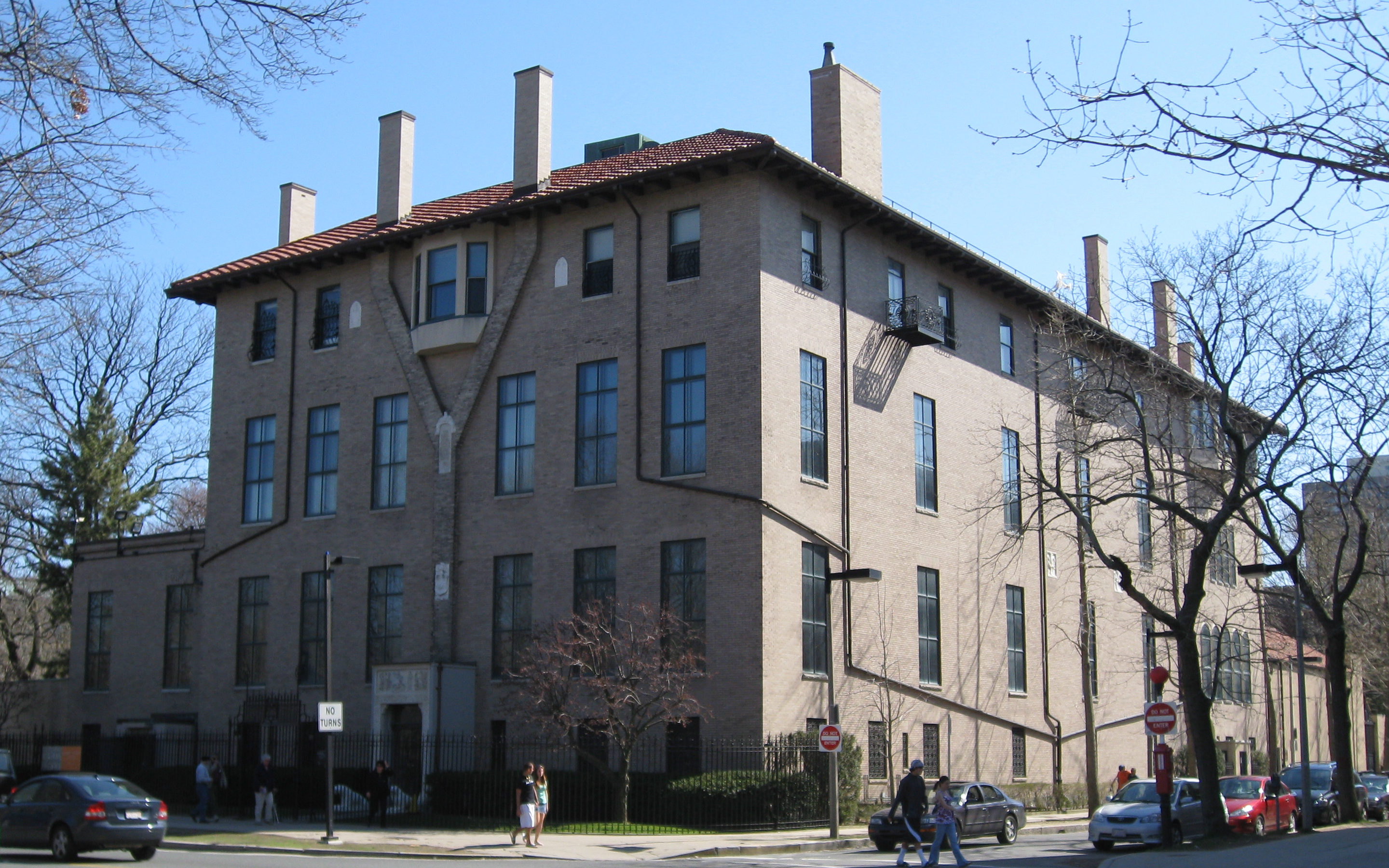
The Isabella Stewart Gardner Museum was robbed in 1990, losing paintings and items valued at over $500 million.

Art theft is the stealing of paintings, sculptures, or other forms of visual art from galleries, museums or other public and private locations. Stolen art is often resold or used by criminals as collateral to secure loans. Only a small percentage of stolen art is recovered—an estimated 10%. Many nations operate police squads to investigate art theft and illegal trade in stolen art and antiquities.

Some famous art theft cases include the robbery of the Mona Lisa from the Louvre in 1911 by employee Vincenzo Peruggia. Another was the theft of The Scream, stolen from the Munch Museum in 2004, but recovered in 2006.

The largest-value art theft occurred at the Isabella Stewart Gardner Museum in Boston, when 13 works, worth a combined $500 million were stolen in 1990. The case remains unsolved.

Large-scale art thefts include the Nazi looting of Europe during World War II and the Russian looting of Ukraine during the 2022 Russian invasion of Ukraine. More recently, French crown jewels were stolen from the Louvre in 2025.

== Individual theft ==
Many thieves are motivated by the fact that valuable art pieces are worth millions of dollars and weigh only a few kilograms at most. Also, while most high-profile museums have extremely tight security, many places with multimillion-dollar art collections have disproportionately poor security measures. That makes them susceptible to thefts that are slightly more complicated than a typical smash-and-grab, but offer a huge potential payoff. Thieves sometimes target works based on their own familiarity with the artist, rather than the artist's reputation in the art world or the theoretical value of the work.

Unfortunately for the thieves, it is extremely difficult to sell the most famous and valuable works without getting caught, because any interested buyer will almost certainly know the work is stolen and advertising it risks someone contacting the authorities. It is also difficult for the buyer to display the work to visitors without it being recognized as stolen, thus defeating much of the point of owning the art. Many famous works have instead been held for ransom from the legitimate owner or even returned without ransom, due to the lack of black-market customers. Returning for ransom also risks a sting operation.

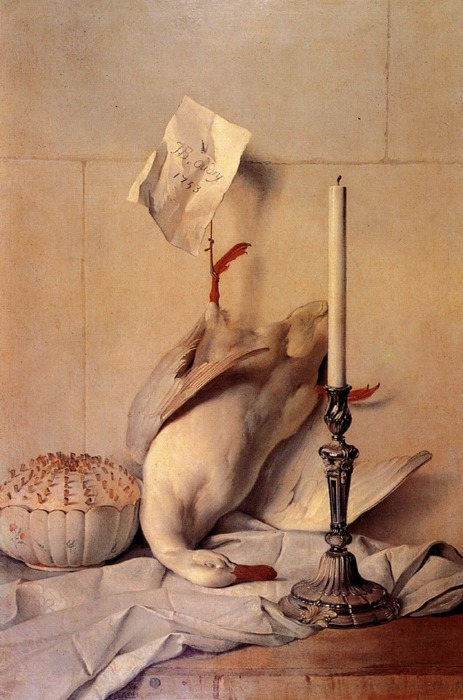
Jean-Baptiste Oudry's The White Duck, which was stolen in 1990

For those with substantial collections, such as the Marquess of Cholmondeley at Houghton Hall, the risk of theft is neither negligible nor negotiable. Jean-Baptiste Oudry's White Duck was stolen from the Cholmondeley collection at Houghton Hall in 1990. The canvas is still missing.

== Prevention in museums ==
Museums can take numerous measures to prevent the theft of artworks include having enough guides or guards to watch displayed items, avoiding situations where security-camera sightlines are blocked, and fastening paintings to walls with hanging wires that are not too thin and with locks.

=== Art theft education ===
The Smithsonian Institution sponsors the National Conference on Cultural Property Protection, held annually in Washington, D. C. The conference is aimed at professionals in the field of cultural property protection.

Since 1996, the Netherlands-based Museum Security Network has disseminated news and information related to issues of cultural property loss and recovery. Since its founding the Museum Security Network has collected and disseminated over 45,000 reports about incidents with cultural property. The founder of the Museum Security Network, Ton Cremers, is recipient of the National Conference on Cultural Property Protection Robert Burke Award.

2007 saw the foundation of the Association for Research into Crimes against Art (ARCA). ARCA is a nonprofit think tank dedicated principally to raising the profile of art crime (art forgery and vandalism, as well as theft) as an academic subject. Since 2009, ARCA has offered an unaccredited postgraduate certificate program dedicated to this field of study. The Postgraduate Certificate Program in Art Crime and Cultural Heritage Protection is held from June to August every year in Italy. A few American universities, including New York University, also offer courses on art theft.

== Recovery ==
In the public sphere, Interpol, the FBI Art Crime Team, London's Metropolitan Police Art and Antiques Unit, New York Police Department's special frauds squad and numerous other law enforcement agencies worldwide maintain "squads" dedicated to investigating thefts of this nature and recovering stolen works of art.

According to Robert King Wittman, a former FBI agent who led the Art Crime Team until his retirement in 2008, the unit is very small compared with similar law-enforcement units in Europe, and most art thefts investigated by the FBI involve agents at local offices who handle routine property theft. "Art and antiquity crime is tolerated, in part, because it is considered a victimless crime," Wittman said in 2010.

In response to a growing public awareness of art theft and recovery, a number of not-for-profit and private companies now act both to record information about losses and oversee recovery efforts for claimed works of art. Among the most notable are:

- IFAR
- Commission for Looted Art in Europe
- Holocaust Claims Conference
- Art Loss Register
- Art Recovery Group

In January 2017, Spain's Interior Ministry announced that police from 18 European countries, with the support of Interpol, Europol, and Unesco, had arrested 75 people involved in an international network of art traffickers. The pan-European operation had begun in October 2016 and led to the recovery of about 3,500 stolen items including archaeological artifacts and other artwork. The ministry did not provide an inventory of recovered items or the locations of the arrests.

In 1969 the Italian Ministry of Cultural Heritage and Activities and Tourism formed the Comando Carabinieri Tutela Patrimonio Culturale (TPC), better known as the Carabinieri Art Squad. In 1980, the TPC established the database Leonardo, with information about more than 1 million stolen artworks, and accessible to law enforcement agencies around the world.

In December 2021 Michael Steinhardt, an American hedge-fund billionaire, was ordered to surrender 180 looted and illegally smuggled antiquities valued at 70 million U.S. dollars. The antiquities will be returned to their rightful owners and Steinhardt is banned for life from acquiring any other relics.

In June 2026, French narcotics police discovered a stolen £13 million Pablo Picasso painting, a 1937 portrait of Marie-Thérèse Walter, during a routine drug raid in an Ormesson-sur-Marne home. A 37-year-old security guard from the art storage facility was arrested after the artwork was found alongside 17kg of cannabis resin and luxury goods.

== State theft, wartime looting and misappropriation by museums ==
From 1933 through the end of World War II, the Nazi regime maintained a policy of looting art for sale or for removal to museums in the Third Reich. Hermann Göring, head of the Luftwaffe, personally took charge of hundreds of valuable pieces, generally stolen from Jews and other victims of the Holocaust.

In early 2011, about 1,500 art masterpieces, assumed to have been stolen by the Nazis during and before World War II, were confiscated from a private home in Munich, Germany. The confiscation was not made public until November 2013. With an estimated value of $1 billion, their discovery is considered "astounding", and includes works by Pablo Picasso, Henri Matisse, Marc Chagall, Paul Klee, Max Beckmann and Emil Nolde, all of which were considered lost.

The looted, mostly Modernist art was banned by the Nazis when they came to power, on the grounds that it was "un-German" or Jewish Bolshevist in nature. Descendants of Jewish collectors who were robbed of their works by the Nazis may be able to claim ownership of many of the works. Members of the families of the original owners of these artworks have, in many cases, persisted in claiming title to their pre-war property.

The 1964 film The Train, starring Burt Lancaster, is based on the true story of works of art which had been placed in storage for protection in France during the war, but was looted by the Germans from French museums and private art collections, to be shipped by train back to Germany. Another film, The Monuments Men (2014), co-produced, co-written and directed by George Clooney, is based on a similar true-life story. In this film, U.S. soldiers are tasked with saving over a million pieces of art and other culturally important items throughout Europe, before their destruction by Nazi plunder.

In 2006, after a protracted court battle in the United States and Austria (see Republic of Austria v. Altmann), five paintings by Austrian artist Gustav Klimt were returned to Maria Altmann, the niece of pre-war owner, Ferdinand Bloch-Bauer. Two of the paintings were portraits of Altmann's aunt, Adele. The more famous of the two, the gold Portrait of Adele Bloch-Bauer I, was sold in 2006 by Altmann and her co-heirs to philanthropist Ronald Lauder for $135 million. At the time of the sale, it was the highest known price ever paid for a painting. The remaining four restituted paintings were later sold at Christie's New York for over $190 million.

Because antiquities are often regarded by the country of origin as national treasures, there are numerous cases where artworks (often displayed in the acquiring country for decades) have become the subject of highly charged and political controversy. One prominent example is the case of the Elgin Marbles, which were moved from the Parthenon to the British Museum in 1816 by the Earl of Elgin. Many different Greek governments have called for the repatriation of the marbles.

Similar controversies have arisen over Etruscan, Aztec, and Italian artworks, with advocates of the originating countries generally alleging that the artifacts taken form a vital part of the countries cultural heritage. Yale University's Peabody Museum of Natural History is engaged (as of November 2006) in talks with the government of Peru about possible repatriation of artifacts taken during the excavation of Machu Picchu by Yale's Hiram Bingham. Likewise, the Chinese government considers Chinese art in foreign hands to be stolen and there may be a clandestine repatriation effort underway.

In 2006, New York's Metropolitan Museum reached an agreement with Italy to return many disputed pieces. The Getty Museum in Los Angeles is also involved in a series of cases of this nature. The artwork in question is of Greek and ancient Italian origin. The museum agreed on November 20, 2006, to return 26 contested pieces to Italy. One of the Getty's signature pieces, a statue of the goddess Aphrodite, is the subject of particular scrutiny.

In January 2013, after investigations by Interpol, FBI and The U.S. Department of Homeland Security, police in Canada arrested John Tillmann for an enormous spate of art thefts. It was later determined that Tillmann in conjunction with his Russian wife, had for over twenty years stolen at least 10,000 different art objects from museums, galleries, archives and shops around the world. While not the largest art heist in total dollar value, Tillmann's case may be the largest ever in number of objects stolen.

Since its invasion of Ukraine in 2022, Russia has stolen tens of thousands of art pieces. Experts state that this is the largest art theft since the Nazi looting of Europe in World War II.

== Famous cases ==
Case of art theft	Dates	Notes	References
Louvre	August 21, 1911	Main article: Mona Lisa § Refuge, theft, and vandalism Perhaps the most famous case of art theft occurred on August 21, 1911, when the Mona Lisa was stolen from the Louvre by employee Vincenzo Peruggia, who was caught after two years.	
Panels from the Ghent Altarpiece	1934	Two panels of the fifteenth-century Ghent Altarpiece, painted by the brothers Jan and Hubert Van Eyck were stolen in 1934, of which only one was recovered shortly after the theft. The other one (lower left of the opened altarpiece, known as De Rechtvaardige Rechters (transl. The Just Judges), has never been recovered, as the presumable thief (Arsène Goedertier), who had sent some anonymous letters asking for ransom, died before revealing the whereabouts of the painting.	
Nazi theft and looting of Europe during the Second World War	1939–1945	Main article: Nazi plunder The Nazi plundering of artworks was carried out by the Reichsleiter Rosenberg Institute for the Occupied Territories (Einsatzstab Reichsleiter Rosenberg für die Besetzen Gebiete). In occupied France, the Jeu de Paume Art Museum in Paris was used as a central storage and sorting depot for looted artworks from museums and private art collections throughout France pending distribution to various persons and places in Germany. The Nazis confiscated tens of thousands of works from their legitimate Jewish owners. Some were confiscated by the Allies at the end of the war. Many ended up in the hands of respectable collectors and institutions. Jewish ownership of some of the art was codified into the Geneva conventions.	
Quedlinburg medieval artifacts	1945	Main article: Theft of medieval art from Quedlinburg In 1945, an American soldier, Joe Meador, stole eight medieval artifacts found in a mineshaft near Quedlinburg, which had been hidden by members of the local clergy from Nazi looters in 1943. After he returned to the United States, the artifacts remained in Meador's possession until his death in 1980. He made no attempt to sell them. When his older brother and sister attempted to sell a 9th-century manuscript and 16th-century prayer book in 1990, the two were charged. However, the charges were dismissed after it was declared the statute of limitations had expired.	
Alfred Stieglitz Gallery	1946	Three paintings by Georgia O'Keeffe were stolen while on display at the art gallery of her husband, Alfred Stieglitz. The paintings were eventually found by O'Keeffe following their purchase by the Princeton Gallery of Fine Arts for $35,000 in 1975. O'Keeffe sued the museum for their return and, despite a six-year statute of limitations on art theft, a state appellate court ruled in her favor on July 27, 1979.	
Dulwich College Picture Gallery	December 30, 1966	A total of eight Old Master paintings—three each by Rembrandt and Peter Paul Rubens, and one each by Adam Elsheimer and Gerrit Dou—were removed from the London gallery. The paintings were appraised at a combined value of £1.5 million (then US$4.2 million). The thieves entered the gallery by cutting a panel out of an unused door. All of the paintings were recovered by January 4, 1967.	
University of Michigan	1967	Sketches by Spanish artist Pablo Picasso and British sculptor Henry Moore, valued at $200,000, were stolen while on display in a travelling art exhibit organized by the University of Michigan. The sketches were eventually found by federal agents in a California auction house on January 24, 1969, although no arrests were made.	
Izmir Archaeology Museum	July 24, 1969	Various artifacts and other art worth $5 million were stolen from the Izmir Archaeology Museum in Istanbul, Turkey on July 24, 1969 (during which a night watchman was killed by the unidentified thieves). Turkish police soon arrested a German citizen who, at the time of his arrest on August 1, had 128 stolen items in his car.	
Stephen Hahn Art Gallery	November 17, 1969	Art thieves stole seven paintings, including works by Cassatt, Monet, Pissarro and Rouault, from art dealer Stephen Hahn's Madison Avenue art gallery at an estimated value of $500,000 on the night of November 17, 1969. Incidentally, Stephen Hahn had been discussing art theft with other art dealers as the theft was taking place.	
1972 Montreal Museum of Fine Arts robbery	September 4, 1972	On September 4, 1972, the Montreal Museum of Fine Arts was the site of the largest art theft in Canadian history, when armed thieves made off with jewelry, figurines and 18 paintings worth a total of $2 million (approximately $10.9 million today), including works by Delacroix, Gainsborough and a rare Rembrandt landscape. Other than a work at the time attributed to Brueghel the Elder returned by the thieves as an effort to start negotiations, the works have never been recovered. In 2003, The Globe and Mail estimated that the Rembrandt alone would be worth $1 million.	
Russborough House	1974–2002	Russborough House, the Irish estate of the late Sir Alfred Beit, has been robbed four times since 1974. In 1974, members of the IRA, including Rose Dugdale, bound and gagged the Beits, making off with nineteen paintings worth an estimated £8 million. A deal to exchange the paintings for prisoners was offered, but the paintings were recovered after a raid on a rented cottage in County Cork, and those responsible were caught and imprisoned. In 1986, a Dublin gang led by Martin Cahill stole eighteen paintings worth an estimated £30 million in total. Sixteen paintings were subsequently recovered, with a further two still missing as of 2006. Two paintings worth an estimated £3 million were stolen by three armed men in 2001. One of these, a Gainsborough had been previously stolen by Cahill's gang. Both paintings were recovered in September 2002. A mere two to three days after the recovery of the two paintings stolen in 2001, the house was robbed for the fourth time, with five paintings taken. These paintings were recovered in December 2002 during a search of a house in Clondalkin.	
Kanakria mosaics and the looting of Cypriot Orthodox Churches following the invasion of Cyprus	1974	Following the invasion of Cyprus in 1974 by Turkey, and the occupation of the northern part of the island churches belonging to the Cypriot Orthodox Church have been looted in what is described as "…one of the most systematic examples of the looting of art since World War II". Several high-profile cases have made headline news on the international scene. Most notable was the case of the Kanakaria mosaics, 6th century AD frescoes that were removed from the original church, trafficked to the US and offered for sale to a museum for the sum of US$20,000,000. These were subsequently recovered by the Orthodox Church following a court case in Indianapolis.	
Picasso works in the Palais des Papes	January 31, 1976	On January 31, 1976, 118 paintings, drawings and other works by Picasso were stolen from an exhibition at the Palais des Papes in Avignon, France.	
L. A. Mayer Institute for Islamic Art	April 15, 1983	On April 15, 1983, more than 200 rare clocks and watches were stolen from the L. A. Mayer Institute for Islamic Art in Jerusalem. Among the stolen watches was one known as the Marie-Antoinette, the most valuable piece of the watch collection made by the French-Swiss watchmaker Abraham-Louis Breguet on order by Queen Marie Antoinette, it is estimated to be worth $30 million. The heist is considered to be the largest robbery in Israel. The man responsible for the robbery was Naaman Diller. On November 18, 2008, French and Israeli police officials discovered half of the cache of stolen timepieces in two bank safes in France. Of the 106 rare timepieces stolen in 1983, 96 have now been recovered. Among those recovered was the rare Marie-Antoinette watch. In 2010, Nili Shamrat, Diller's widow, was sentenced to 300 hours of community service and given a five-year suspended sentence for possession of stolen property.	
Musée Marmottan Monet	October 28, 1985	Main article: Musée Marmottan Monet § 1985 theft On October 28, 1985, during daylight hours, five masked gunmen entered the museum and stole nine paintings, threatening security and visitors in the process. Among the stolen works were Impression, Sunrise (Impression, Soleil Levant) by Claude Monet, the painting from which Impressionism derived its name. Also stolen were Camille Monet and Cousin on the Beach at Trouville, Portrait of Jean Monet, Portrait of Poly, Fisherman of Belle-Isle and Field of Tulips in Holland also by Monet, Bather Sitting on a Rock and Portrait of Monet by Pierre-Auguste Renoir, Young Woman at the Ball by Berthe Morisot, and Portrait of Monet by Sei-ichi Naruse and were valued at $12 million.The paintings were later recovered in Corsica in 1990.	
University of Arizona Museum of Art	November 27, 1985	A couple who arrived at the museum shortly before it opened for the day left ten minutes later. Guards found shortly afterwards that Willem de Kooning's Woman-Ochre had been cut from its frame; sketches were made of the couple but the investigation was unable to make any progress until 2017, when a New Mexico antique dealer found the painting in the home of a recently deceased woman for whom he had been contracted to hold an estate sale. After his customers told him the painting was likely a de Kooning, he found that it had been stolen in 1987 during an Internet search. He contacted the museum, which sent staff the next day to pick it up.	
Isabella Stewart Gardner Museum	March 18, 1990	Main article: Isabella Stewart Gardner Museum theft The largest art theft, and the largest theft of any private property, in world history occurred in Boston on March 18, 1990, when thieves stole 13 pieces, collectively worth $300 million, from the Isabella Stewart Gardner Museum. A reward of $5,000,000 was on offer for information leading to their return, but expired at the end of 2017. A reward of $10,000,000.00 is currently (2024)being offered by the museum, with a separate $100,000 reward for the eagle finial. The pieces stolen were: Vermeer's The Concert, which is the most valuable stolen painting in the world; two Rembrandt paintings, The Storm on the Sea of Galilee (his only known seascape) and Portrait of a Lady and Gentleman in Black; A Rembrandt self-portrait etching; Manet's Chez Tortoni; five drawings by Edgar Degas; Govaert Flinck's Landscape with an Obelisk; an ancient Chinese Qu; and a finial that once stood atop a flag from Napoleon's Army.	
The Scream (National Museum of Art, Architecture and Design)	February 12, 1994	Main article: The Scream § Thefts In 1994, Edvard Munch's The Scream was stolen from the National Gallery in Oslo, Norway, and held for ransom. It was recovered later in the year.	
Kunsthalle Schirn	July 28, 1994	Main article: Frankfurt art theft (1994) Three paintings were stolen from a German gallery in 1994, two of them belonging to the Tate Gallery in London. In 1998, Tate conceived of Operation Cobalt, the secret buyback of the paintings from the thieves. The paintings were recovered in 2000 and 2002, resulting in a profit of several million pounds for Tate, because of prior insurance payments.	
Mather Brown's Thomas Jefferson	July 28, 1994	While being stored in preparation to be reproduced, the portrait of Thomas Jefferson painted by artist Mather Brown in 1786, was stolen from a Boston warehouse on July 28, 1994. Authorities apprehended the thieves and recovered the painting on May 24, 1996, following a protracted FBI investigation.	
Caracas Museum of Contemporary Art (MACCSI)	1999–2000	The work of Henri Matisse Odalisque with red trousers, dating back to 1925 was stolen from the museum and replaced by a bad imitation; this work valued at ten million dollars was recovered in 2012 and returned to the institution two years later.	
Cooperman Art Theft hoax	1999	In July 1999, Los Angeles ophthalmologist Steven Cooperman was convicted of insurance fraud for arranging the theft of two paintings, a Picasso and a Monet, from his home in an attempt to collect $17.5 million in insurance.	
Vjeran Tomic	Fall, 2000	In France, using a crossbow, ropes, and a caribiner, Tomic broke into an apartment and stole two Renoirs, a Derain, an Utrillo, a Braque, and various other works worth more than a million euros.	
Nationalmuseum	December 22, 2000	Main article: Nationalmuseum Robbery One Rembrandt and two Renoir paintings were stolen from the Nationalmuseum in Stockholm, Sweden, after three armed thieves, who had diverted the attention of police by setting off two separate car bombs nearby beforehand, broke into the museum and fled using a boat, moored nearby. By 2001, the police had recovered one of the Renoirs and by March 2005 they had recovered the second one in Los Angeles. That year, in September, they recovered the Rembrandt in a sting operation in a hotel in Copenhagen.	
Stephane Breitwieser	2001	Main article: Stephane Breitwieser Stephane Breitwieser admitted to stealing 238 artworks and other exhibits from museums travelling around Europe; his motive was to build a vast personal collection. In January 2005, Breitwieser was given a 26-month prison sentence. Unfortunately, over 60 paintings, including masterpieces by Brueghel, Watteau, François Boucher, and Corneille de Lyon were chopped up by Breitwieser's mother, Mireille Stengel, in what police believe was an effort to remove incriminating evidence against her son.	
Van Gogh Museum	December 8, 2002	Main article: Van Gogh Museum § Art thefts The two paintings Congregation Leaving the Reformed Church in Nuenen and View of the Sea at Scheveningen by Vincent van Gogh were stolen from the Van Gogh Museum in Amsterdam, Netherlands. Two men were convicted for the theft. The FBI Art Crime Team estimates their combined value at US$30 million. The paintings were recovered from the Naples mafia in September 2016 following a raid on a house at Castellammare di Stabia, near Pompeii.	
Whitworth Art Gallery	April 26, 2003	Three artworks—Vincent van Gogh's The Fortification of Paris with Houses, Pablo Picasso's Blue Period Poverty and Paul Gauguin's Tahitian Landscape—valued at £4 million were discovered missing by staff at the Whitworth Art Gallery in Manchester on the morning of Sunday April 27, 2003. The pieces were stolen any time from 21:00 the evening prior in a heist described as sophisticated by Greater Manchester Police. The thieves had bypassed the gallery's alarm systems, unscrewed the paintings and carried them to a back door, leaving the grounds via a hole in a chain-link fence. Initially it was speculated the three pieces had been stolen to order, however, shortly after 02:00 on Monday April 28, police received an anonymous 999 call directing them to a disused public lavatory in the adjacent Whitworth Park, some 200 metres from the gallery. The artworks were discovered in the toilets, rolled up inside a brown cardboard poster tube alongside a handwritten note criticising the gallery's security. (The Whitworth Gallery had in fact updated its security system two years prior). The pieces suffered minor damage, with the Van Gogh bearing a small tear in the corner, and the Picasso and Gauguin both water damaged. However, all were restored and returned to public view within a matter of weeks. The frames were not recovered.	
The Scream and Madonna (Munch Museum)	August 22, 2004	Main article: The Scream § Thefts On August 22, 2004, another original of The Scream was stolen—Munch painted several versions of The Scream—together with Munch's Madonna. This time the thieves targeted the version held by the Munch Museum, from where the two paintings were stolen at gunpoint and during opening hours. Both paintings were recovered on August 31, 2006, relatively undamaged. Three men have already been convicted, but the gunmen remain at large. If caught, they could face up to eight years in prison.	
Munch paintings theft in Norway	March 6, 2005	On March 6, 2005, three more Munch paintings were stolen from a hotel in Norway, including Blue Dress, and were recovered the next day.	
Kunsthistorisches Museum	May 11, 2003	Main article: Cellini Salt Cellar § Theft and return On May 11, 2003, Benvenuto Cellini's Saliera was stolen from the Kunsthistorisches Museum in Vienna, which was covered by a scaffolding at that time due to reconstruction works. On January 21, 2006, the Saliera was recovered by the Austrian police.	
Henry Moore Foundation Perry Green	December 15, 2005	The artist's cast of Reclining Figure 1969–70, a bronze sculpture of British sculptor Henry Moore, was stolen from the Henry Moore Foundation's Perry Green base on December 15, 2005. Thieves are believed to have lifted the 3.6 × 2 × 2 metres (11.8 × 6.6 × 6.6 ft) wide, 2.1-tonne statue onto the back of a Mercedes lorry using a crane. Police investigating the theft believe it could have been stolen for scrap value.	
Museu da Chácara do Céu	February 24, 2006	On February 24, 2006, the paintings Man of Sickly Complexion Listening to the Sound of the Sea by Salvador Dalí, The Dance by Pablo Picasso, Luxembourg Gardens by Henri Matisse, and Marine by Claude Monet were stolen from the Museu da Chácara do Céu in Rio de Janeiro, Brazil. The thieves took advantage of a carnival parade passing by the museum and disappeared into the crowd. The paintings haven't been recovered yet.	
São Paulo Museum of Art	December 20, 2007	On December 20, 2007, around five o'clock in the morning, three men invaded the São Paulo Museum of Art and took two paintings, considered to be among the most valuable of the museum: the Portrait of Suzanne Bloch by Pablo Picasso and Cândido Portinari's O lavrador de café. The whole action took about 3 minutes. The paintings, which are listed as Brazilian National Heritage by IPHAN, remained missing until January 8, 2008, when they were recovered in Ferraz de Vasconcelos by the Police of São Paulo. The paintings were returned, undamaged, to the São Paulo Museum of Art.	
Foundation E.G. Bührle	February 11, 2008	Main article: Foundation E.G. Bührle § Art theft On February 11, 2008, four major impressionist paintings were stolen from the Foundation E.G. Bührle in Zürich, Switzerland. They were Monet's Poppy Field at Vetheuil, Ludovic Lepic and his Daughter by Edgar Degas, Van Gogh's Blossoming Chestnut Branches, and Cézanne's Boy in the Red Vest. The total worth of the four is estimated at $163 million.	
Pinacoteca do Estado de São Paulo	June 12, 2008	On June 12, 2008, three armed men broke into the Pinacoteca do Estado Museum, São Paulo with a crowbar and a carjack around 5:09 am and stole The Painter and the Model (1963) and Minotaur, Drinker and Women (1933) by Pablo Picasso, Women at the Window (1926) by Emiliano Di Cavalcanti, and Couple (1919) by Lasar Segall. It was the second theft of art in São Paulo in six months. On August 6, 2008, two paintings were discovered in the house of one of the thieves and recovered by police in the same city.	
Hübner Palace, Budapest	February 11, 2010	Main article: Hübner Palace § 2010 theft On February 11, 2010, Rácz Erzsébet, owner of the painting of Palma il Giovane—Venus with a Mirror, reported a set of robberies. In its course all of her art collection were taken. Among other paintings this one too. The painting: oil, dry fresco, wooden tablet. Szépművészeti Múzeum (Museum of Fine Arts registration number: 290137.	
Musée d'Art Moderne de la Ville de Paris	May 10, 2010	Main article: Musée d'Art Moderne de la Ville de Paris § 2010 theft On May 20, 2010, the Musée d'Art Moderne de la Ville de Paris reported the overnight theft of five paintings from its collection. The paintings taken were Le pigeon aux petits pois by Pablo Picasso, La Pastorale by Henri Matisse, L'Olivier près de l'Estaque by Georges Braque, La Femme à l'éventail (Modigliani) by Amedeo Modigliani and Still Life with Candlestick (Nature Morte aux Chandeliers) by Fernand Léger and were valued at €100 million ($123 million). The thief was eventually found to be Vjeran Tomic.	
Venus Over Manhattan	June 19, 2012	Main article: Cartel de Don Juan Tenorio On June 19, 2012, Salvador Dalí's Cartel de Don Juan Tenorio was stolen from the then month-old Venus Over Manhattan gallery in New York City. The theft was captured on tape. The drawing was mailed back to the gallery from Greece, and was displayed for the last day of a 10-day show.	
Dulwich Park	December 19–20, 2012	A cast of Barbara Hepworth's (5/6) Two Forms (Divided Circle) was displayed in Dulwich Park from 1970 until it was cut from it plinth by scrap metal thieves in December 2011. It was insured for £500,000, but its scrap value was estimated at perhaps £750. Southwark Council offered a reward of £1,000, and the Hepworth Estate increased the reward to £5,000, for information leading to the arrest and conviction of the thieves.	
Kunsthal	October 16, 2012	Main article: Kunsthal § Art theft On October 16, 2012, seven paintings were stolen from the museum in Rotterdam. The paintings included Monet's Waterloo Bridge, London and Charing Cross Bridge, London, Picasso's Tete d'Arlequin, Gauguin's Femme devant une fenêtre ouverte, Matisse's La Liseuse en Blanc et Jaune, De Haan's Autoportrait, and Lucian Freud's Woman with Eyes Closed.	
John Tillmann	January 18, 2013	Main article: John Tillmann On January 18, 2013, police in Canada arrested John Mark Tillmann of Fall River Nova Scotia after extensive investigations by Interpol, FBI, RCMP and the US Dept of Homeland Security. The case was mammoth and it took authorities nearly three years to close the file. Tillmann was sentenced to nine years in prison for stealing over 10,000 pieces of art-work. In sheer volume, it may be the biggest case of art heist of all time. It was later determined that Tillmann had acted in concert with his Russian wife and her brother, and that they had travelled extensively posing as security and maintenance workers to gain access to museums. Successfully eluding authorities for almost twenty years, the trio had stolen millions of dollars of artifacts in every continent except Australia. Tillmann and his accomplice wife, even raided the Nova Scotia Provincial Legislature in his home province, making off with a valuable 200 year old watercolour. He was versatile in his art thefts, not solely concentrating on paintings, but also known for stealing rare books, statutes, coins, edged weapons, and even a 5,000 year old Egyptian mummy. A university graduate, he was a history buff.	
Sripuranthan Chola Idols	January, 2006	Main article: Sripuranthan Natarajan Idol In 2006, about 8 antique Chola idols, that of Natarajar and Uma Mashewari, Vinayagar, Devi, Deepalaksmi, Chandrashekarar, Sampanthar and Krishnar, were stolen from the Brihadeeswarar temple at Sripuranthan, allegedly on the orders of New York-based art dealer Subhash Kapoor, and smuggled to the United States. Of these statues the Natarajar idol was sold to the National Gallery of Australia, Canberra for US$5.1 million and the Vinayagar idol to the Toledo Museum of Art, Ohio, and the Uma Maheswari idol to Asian Civilisation Museum, Singapore. The scandal was exposed by the investigative website Chasing Aphrodite, and received wide coverage in the Indian media. The Australian Government decided to return to idol to India and it was handed over to the Indian Prime Minister. The other museums also agreed to return the stolen idols.	
Francis Bacon art in Madrid	June 2015, made public in March 2016	Five paintings—said to be of medium-to-small size and worth a combined estimated €30m—by Irish artist Francis Bacon were stolen from the Madrid home of their owner during his absence in what has been defined as the largest contemporary art heist in recent Spanish history. The owner is the last known love interest of the painter, from whom he had inherited the paintings. The art thieves left no fingerprints and managed to get away with the works without setting off any alarms or raising any eyebrows in one of the city's safest and most heavily monitored districts. In May 2016 seven people were detained in connection with the case, they stand accused for masterminding the heist and are currently on parole. However the artworks (which are believed to remain somewhere in Spain) were not found. In July 2017 three of the five paintings were recovered by the Spanish police.	
Art theft and looting by Russia during the invasion of Ukraine	2022–present	Main article: Art theft and looting by Russia during the invasion of Ukraine Since its invasion of Ukraine in 2022, Russia has stolen tens of thousands of art pieces. Experts state that this is the largest art theft since the Nazi looting of Europe in World War II. Looted locations include the Kherson Art Museum.	
Green Vault	25 November 2019	Main article: Dresden Green Vault burglary In the early morning of 25 November 2019, at least seven thieves burglarized the Green Vault museum within Dresden Castle in Dresden, Germany, destroying a power box to cut power and gaining entry to the museums' Jewel Room through a pre-cut hole in the iron bars around a window. The thieves stole over a hundred pieces of crown jewels, including the 62-carat Dresden White Diamond. As of October 2025, thirty one items have been recovered after negotiations with six of the men on trial for the burglary.	
Drents Museum	25 January 2025	Main article: 2025 Drents Museum heist In the early morning of 25 January 2025, a group of thieves used explosives to break into the Drents Museum in Assen, Netherlands and stole Dacian artifacts including the Helmet of Coțofenești, which were on loan from the National History Museum of Romania.	
Louvre	19 October 2025	Main article: 2025 Louvre robbery On the morning of 19 October 2025, four robbers disguised as workers used a monte-meuble, a vehicle with an electric ladder, to gain entry into the Galerie d'Apollon of the Louvre, which was closed for renovations. The thieves used disc cutters to break into display cases and stole eight pieces of the French Crown Jewels, escaping via motor scooters after the heist, which lasted only seven minutes. As of October 2025, the thieves and the stolen pieces are still at large, except for the Crown of Empress Eugénie which was dropped and damaged by the thieves.	

== Notable unrecovered works ==
Images of some artworks that have been stolen and have not yet been recovered.

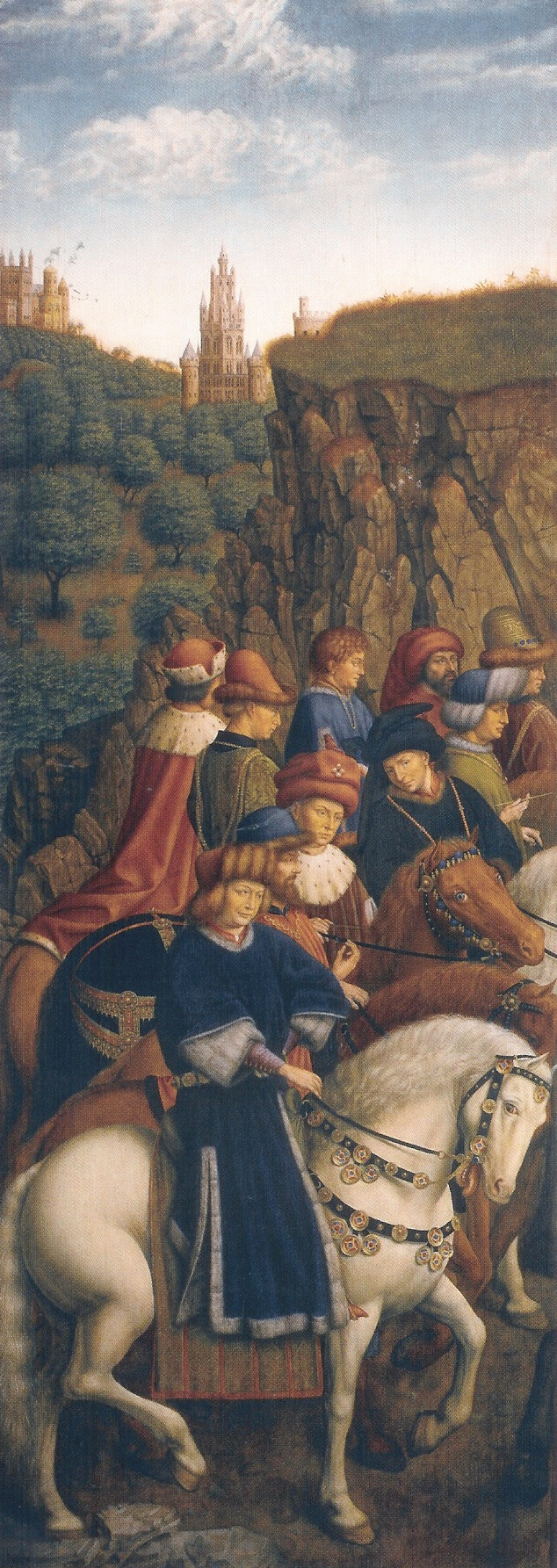
Jan van Eyck: The Just Judges

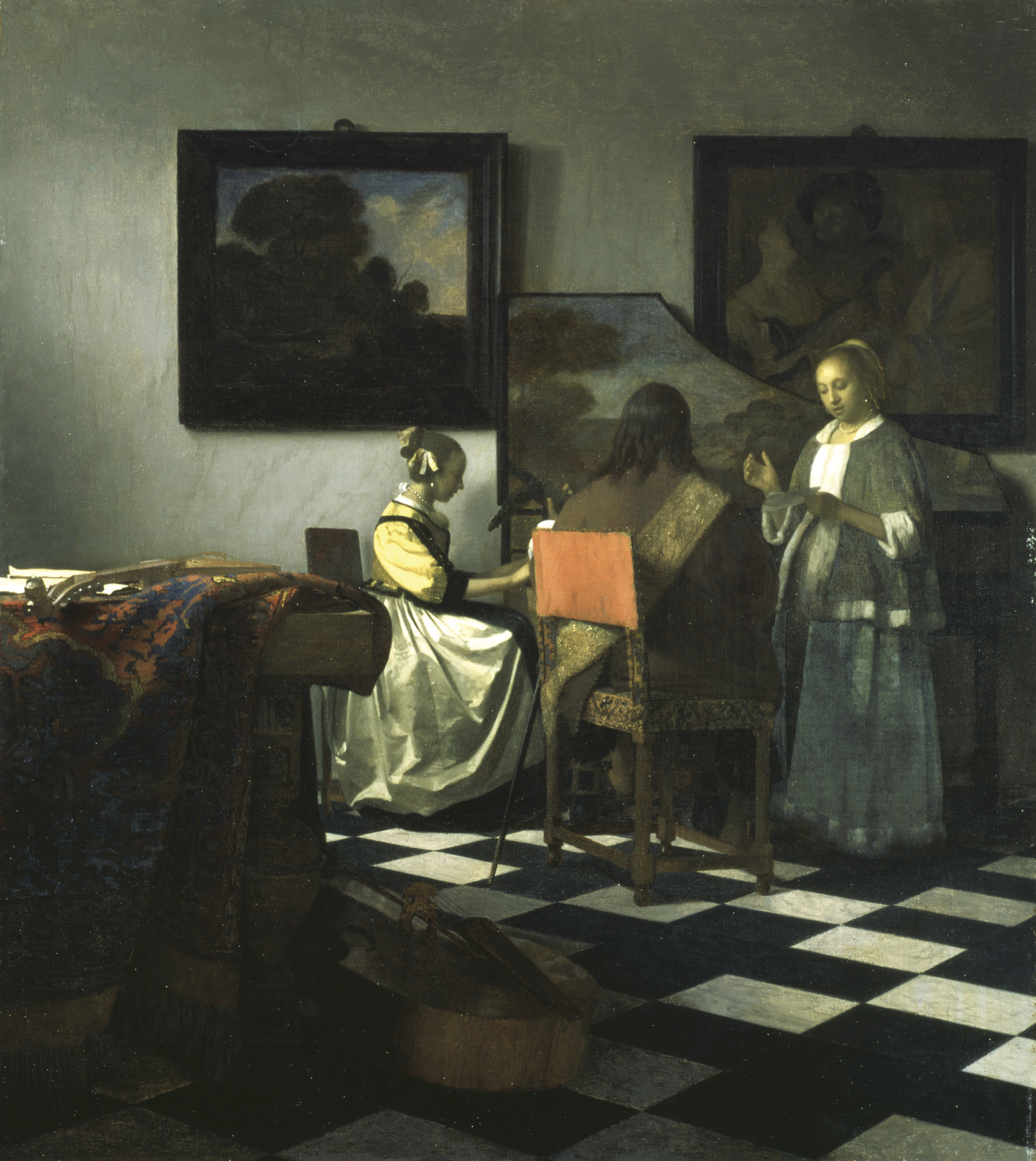
Johannes Vermeer: The Concert (c. 1658–1660)

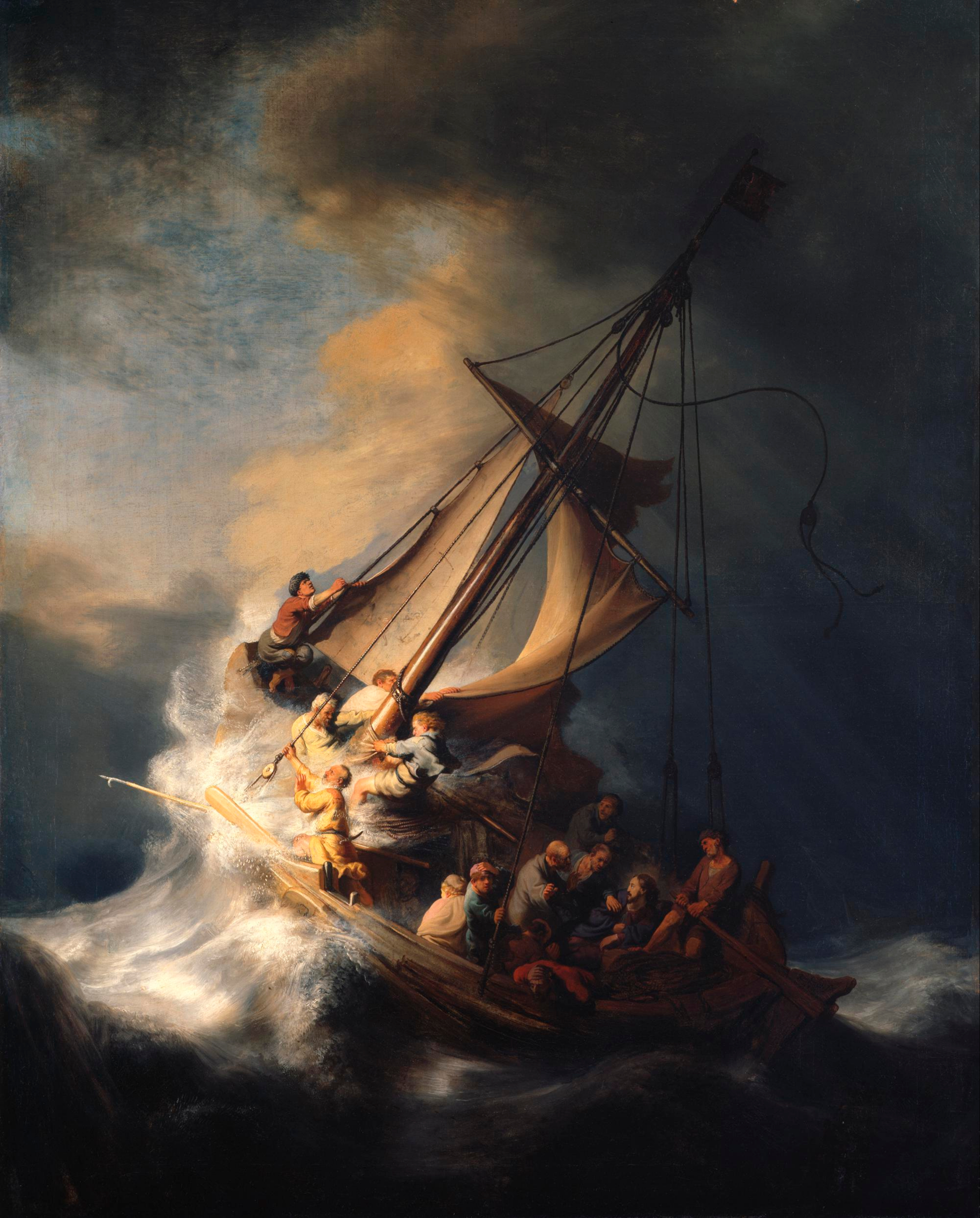
Rembrandt: The Storm on the Sea of Galilee (1633)

Govaert Flinck, until recently attributed to Rembrandt: Landscape with an Obelisk (1638)

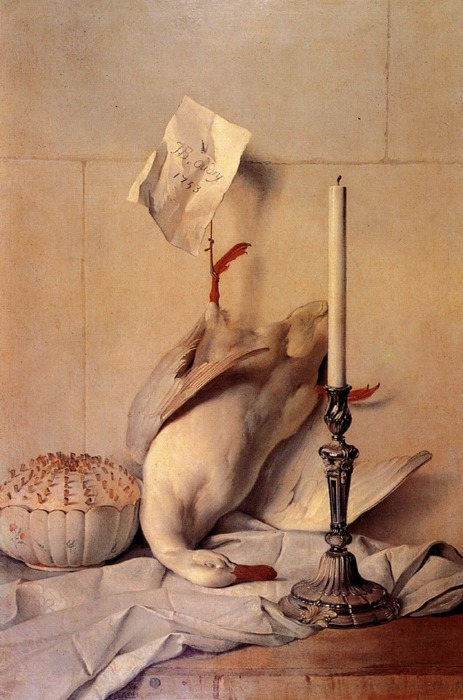
Jean-Baptiste Oudry: The White Duck (1753)

Pablo Picasso:
Le pigeon aux petits pois (1911). Stolen from Musée d'Art Moderne de la Ville de Paris

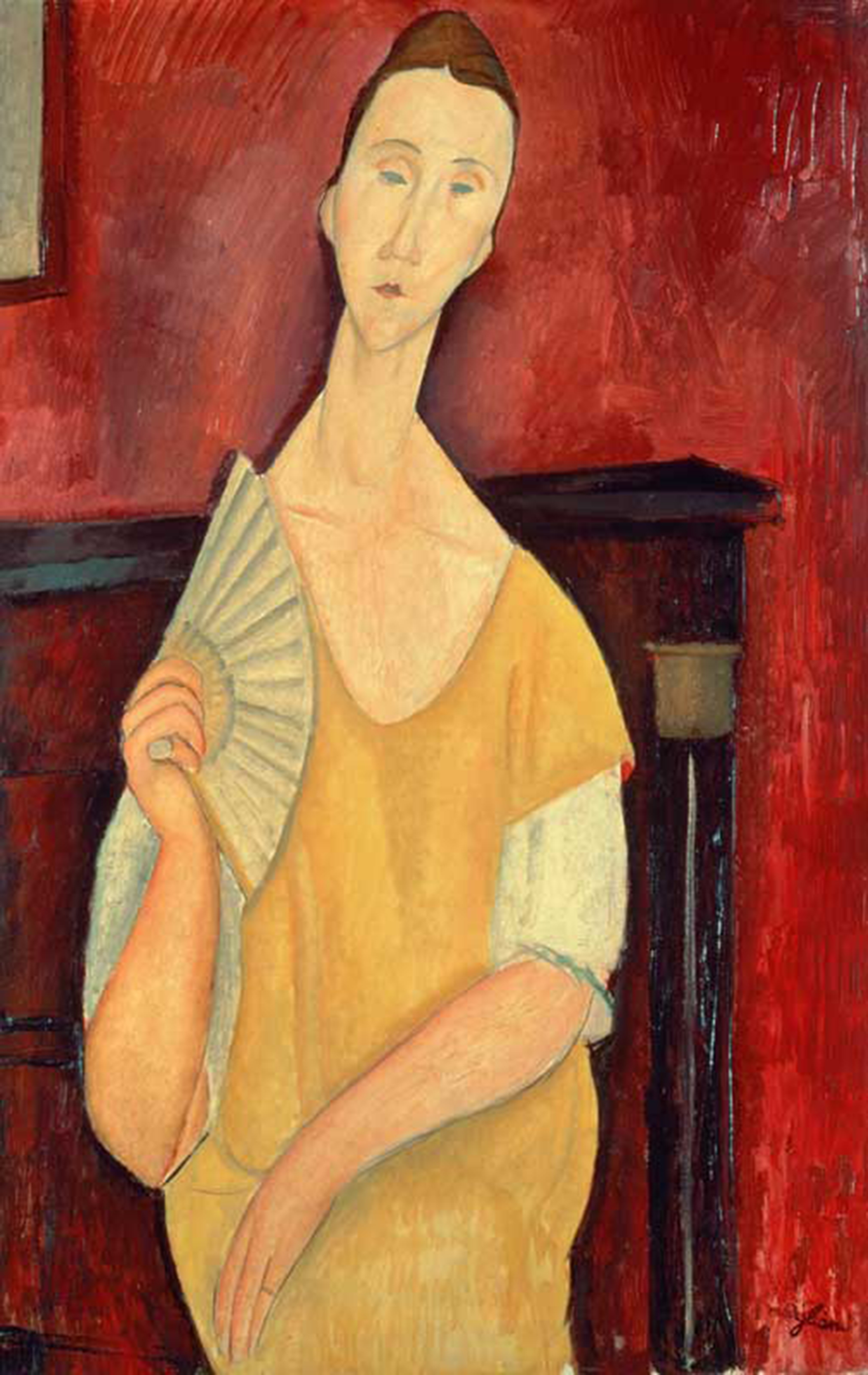
Amedeo Modigliani:
La Femme à l'éventail (Modigliani) (1919). Stolen from Musée d'Art Moderne de la Ville de Paris

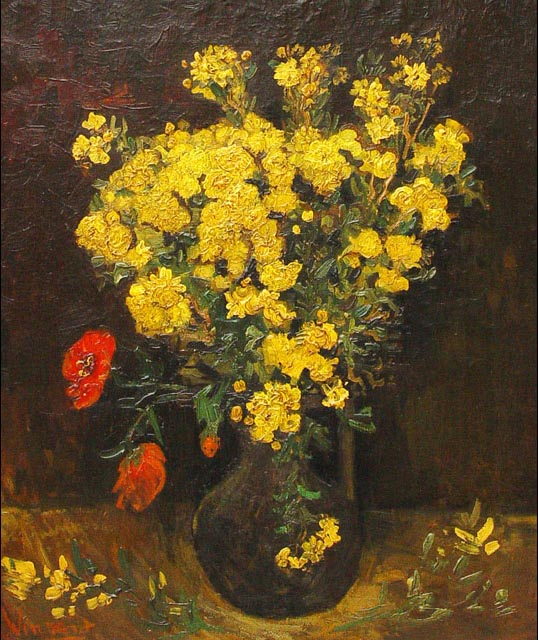
Vincent van Gogh: Vase with poppies/Vase with Viscaria/Vase with Lychnis (1886) stolen from the Mohamed Mahmoud Khalil Museum, Cairo in 2010

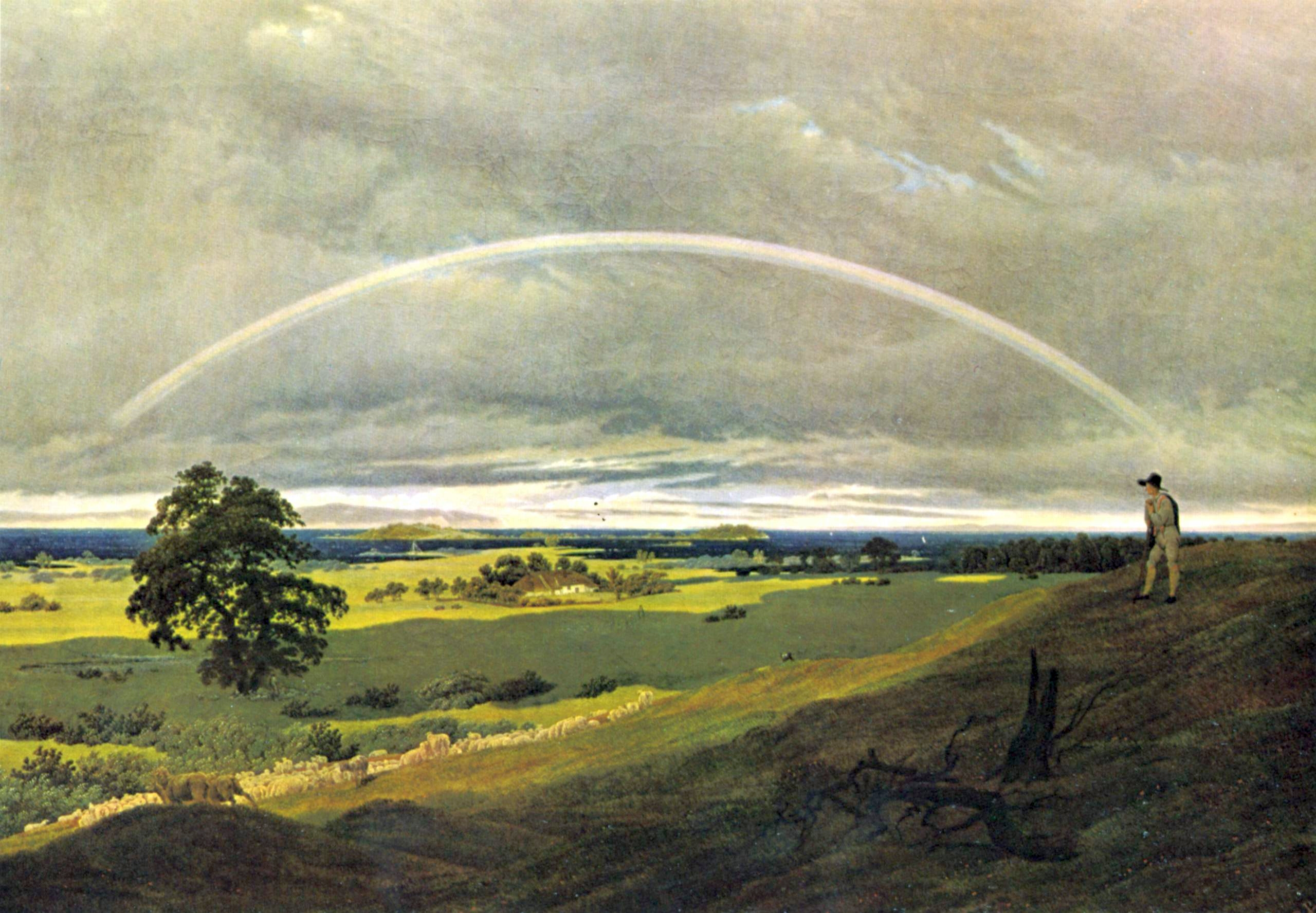
Caspar David Friedrich: Landschaft mit Regenbogen, (Landscape with rainbow) (c. 1810)

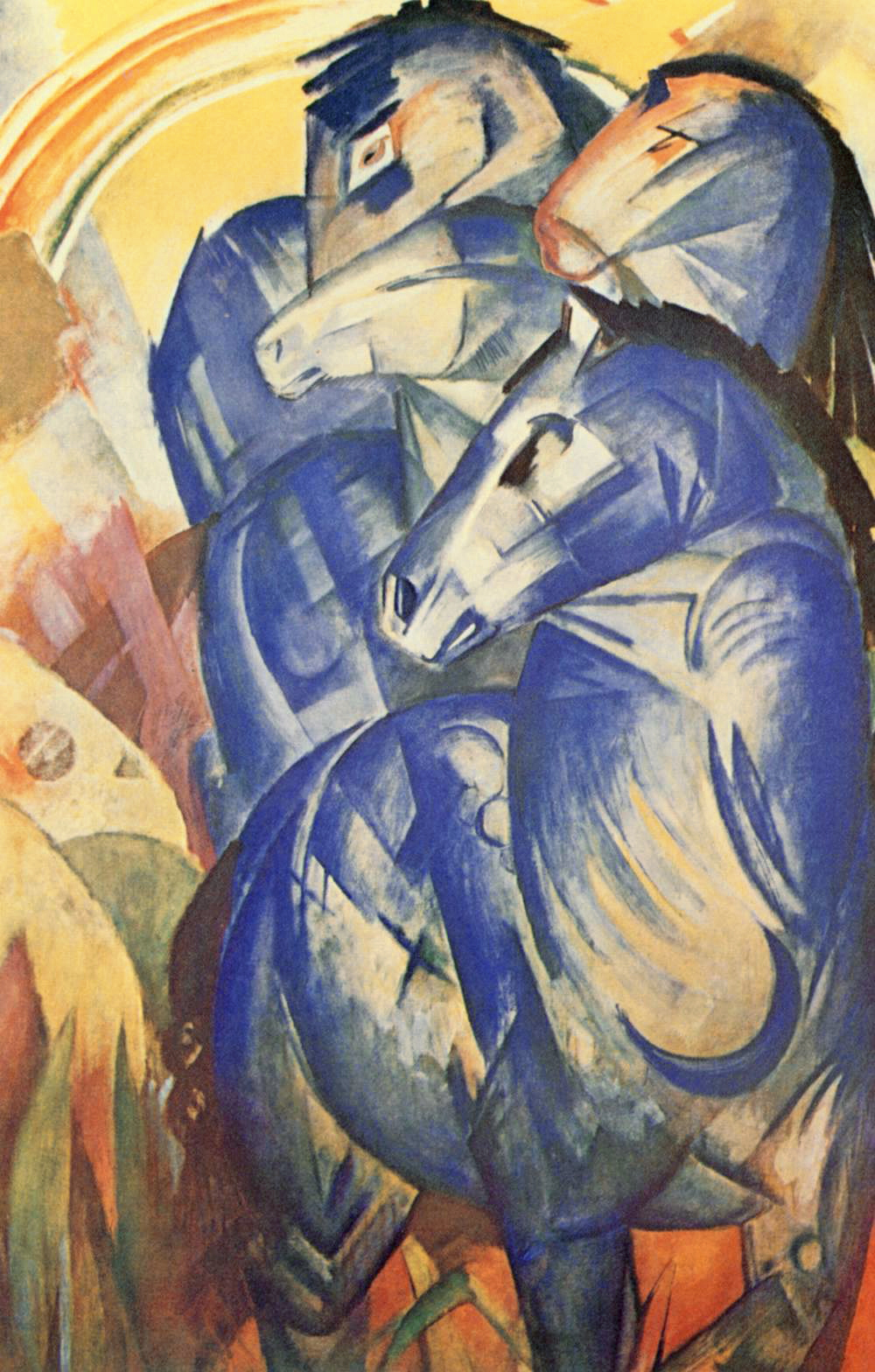
Franz Marc: The Tower of Blue Horses 1913 (missing since 1945)

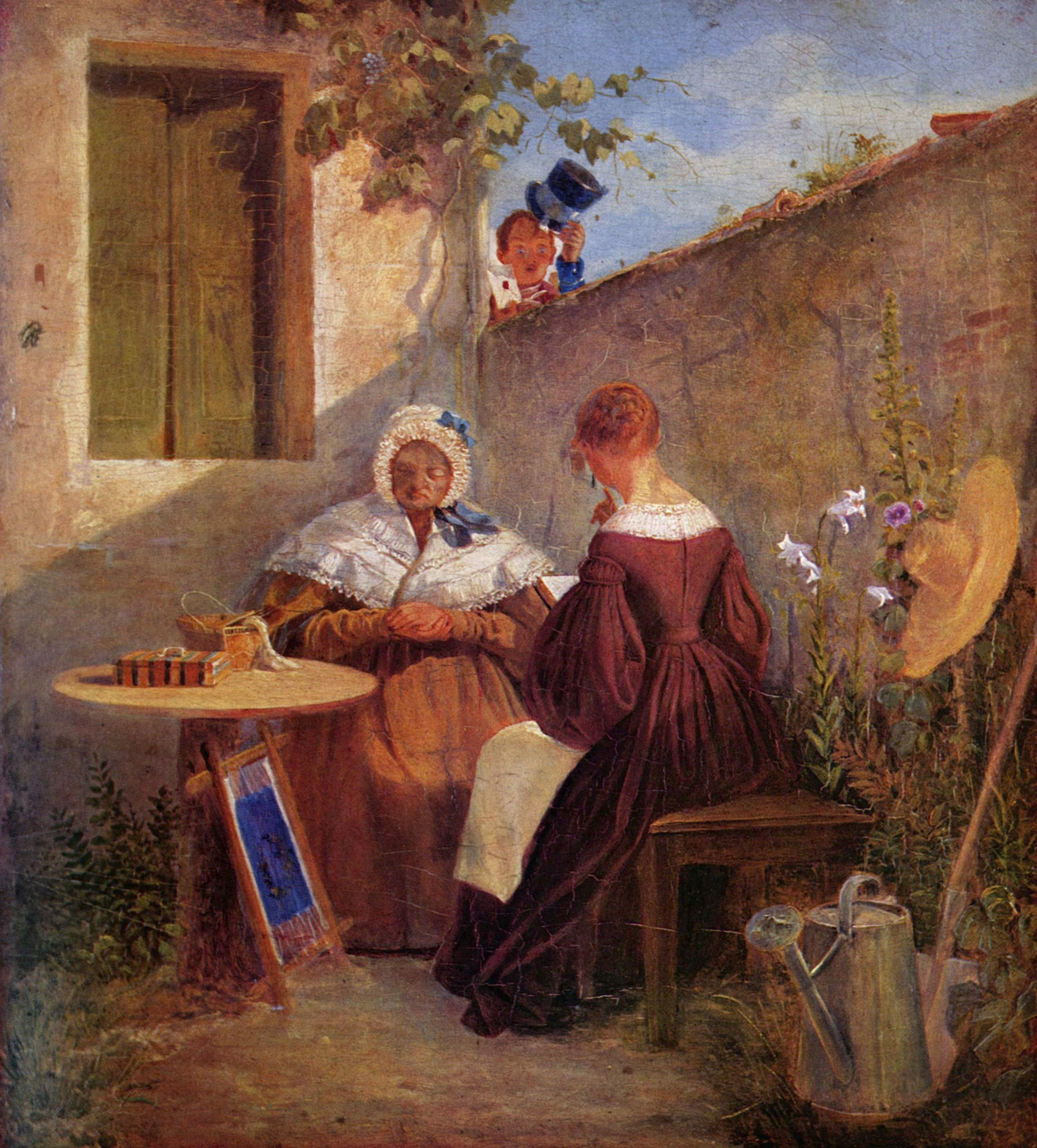
Carl Spitzweg: Der Liebesbrief 1845–1846 (missing since 1989)

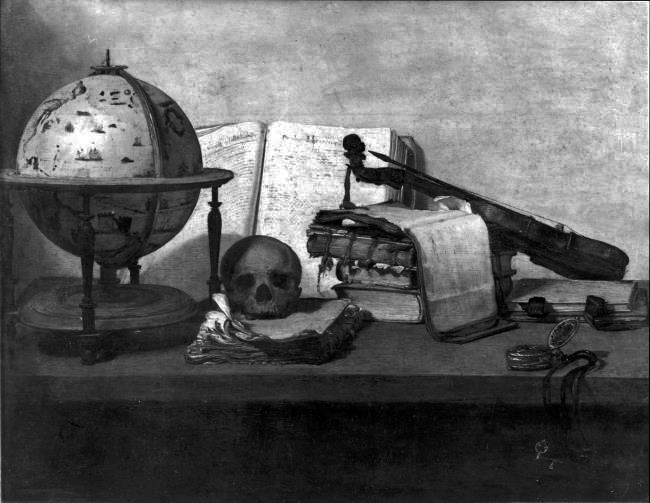
In style of Jan Davidsz. de Heem: Vanitas still life with books, a globe, a skull, a violin and a pocket watch c. 1650, stolen from the Montreal Museum of Fine Arts in 1972

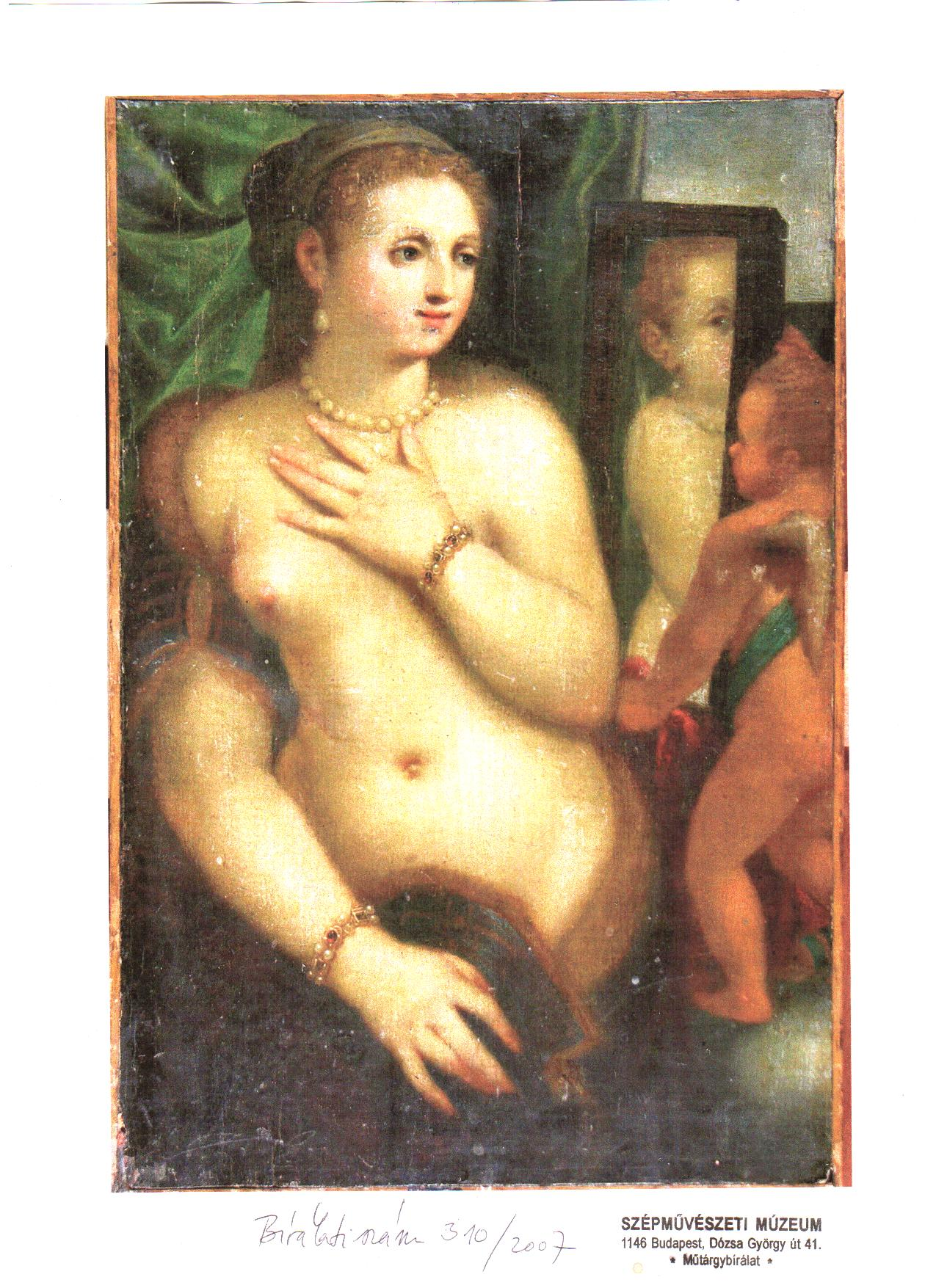
Titian: Venus with a Mirror (sketch, c. 1511

== In fiction ==
Genres such as crime fiction often portray fictional art thefts as glamorous or exciting raising generations of admirers. Most of these sources add adventurous, even heroic element to the theft, portraying it as an achievement. In literature, a niche of the mystery genre is devoted to art theft and forgery. In film, a caper story usually features complicated heist plots and visually exciting getaway scenes. In many of these movies, the stolen art piece is a MacGuffin.

=== Literature ===
- False Idols by Patrick Lohier, Lisa Klink, and Diana Renn is a thriller about antiquities theft that starts in Cairo and spans the globe. The serial novel was written with input from famous FBI art detective Robert King Wittman.
- Author Iain Pears has a series of novels known as the Art History Mysteries, each of which follows a fictional shady dealing in the art history world.
- St. Agatha's Breast by T. C. Van Adler follows an order of monks attempting to track the theft of an early Poussin work.
- The Man Who Stole the Mona Lisa by Robert Noah is a historical fiction speculating on the motivations behind the actual theft.
- Inca Gold by Clive Cussler is a Dirk Pitt adventure about pre-Columbian art theft.
- Author James Twining has written a trio of novels featuring an art thief called Tom Kirk. The third book, The Gilded Seal is centered on a fictional theft of Da Vinci works, specifically, the Mona Lisa.
- Ian Rankin's novel Doors Open centers on an art heist organised by a bored businessman.
- The Art Thief by Noah Charney, a fiction quoting art thefts in history, some plots are based on the real theft of missing Caravaggio from Palermo. Through a character's mouth the author also gave his conclusion as how to narrow the circle of suspects for the famous robbery of the Boston Gardner Museum.
- Chasing Vermeer by Blue Balliett
- In The Tenth Chamber by Glenn Cooper, a fictional town hijacks a train and steals, among other artifacts, the Portrait of a Young Man by Raphael (missing in real life), offering a fictional explanation as to its disappearance.
- Heist Society by Ally Carter is a young adult fiction novel depicting teens who rob the Henley.
- In the manga From Eroica With Love, British Earl, Dorian Red, Earl of Gloria, is the notorious art thief, Eroica.
- Art Historian Noah Charney's 2011 monograph, "The Thefts of the Mona Lisa: On Stealing the Worlds Most Famous Painting" (ARCA Publications) is a full account of the 1911 theft of the Mona Lisa from the Louvre Museum.
- In If Tomorrow Comes by Sidney Sheldon, a very cunning plan to steal a painting by Francisco Goya was watched closely by an Interpol officer, but eventually succeeded.
- B.A. Shapiro's 2012 novel The Art Forger is a fictional modern literary thriller involving art-forgery and fraud years after the historical art-heist at the Isabella Steward Gardener Museum.

=== Film ===
- Topkapi (1964) starring Melina Mercouri, Maximilian Schell, and Peter Ustinov, depicts the meticulously planned theft of an emerald-encrusted dagger from the Topkapi Museum in Istanbul.
- How to Steal a Million (1966) starring Peter O'Toole and Audrey Hepburn, about the theft from a Paris museum of a fake Cellini sculpture to prevent its exposure as a forgery.
- Gambit (1966), starring Michael Caine and Shirley MacLaine
- Once a Thief (1991), directed by John Woo, follows a trio of art-thieves in Hong Kong who stumble across a valuable cursed painting.
- Hudson Hawk (1991) centers on a cat burglar who is forced to steal Da Vinci works of art for a world domination plot.
- In Entrapment (1999), an insurance agent is persuaded to join the world of art theft by an aging master thief.
- Ocean's Twelve (2004) involves the theft of four paintings (including Blue Dancers by Edgar Degas) and the main plot revolves around a competition to steal a Fabergé egg.
- Vinci (2004), a Polish art thief is hired to steal Lady with an Ermine by Leonardo da Vinci from the Czartoryski Museum in Kraków and gets his former partner-turned police officer friend to help him.
- The Maiden Heist (2009), three museum security guards who devise a plan to steal back the artworks to which they have become attached after they are transferred to another museum.
- Headhunters (2011), a corporate recruiter who doubles as an art thief sets out to steal a Rubens painting from one of his job prospects.
- Doors Open (2012), a British television movie based on the novel by Ian Rankin.
- Trance (2013) Simon, an art auctioneer, becomes involved in the theft of a painting, Goya's Witches in the Air, from his own auction house.
- The Thomas Crown Affair (1999), When the painting of San Giorgio Maggiore at Dusk by Monet is stolen from the Metropolitan Museum of Art, the insurers of the $100 million artwork send investigator Catherine Banning (Rene Russo) to assist NYPD Detective Michael McCann (Denis Leary) in solving the crime.
- Belphegor, Phantom of the Louvre (2001), A rare collection of artifacts from an archaeological dig in Egypt are brought to the famous Musée du Louvre in Paris. While experts are using a laser scanning device to determine the age of a sarcophagus, a ghostly spirit escapes and makes its way into the museum's electrical system.
- Woman in Gold (2015), historical drama about the efforts of Maria Altmann's decade-long battle to reclaim Gustav Klimt's painting of her aunt, Portrait of Adele Bloch-Bauer I.
- St. Trinian's (2007), A group of schoolgirls scheme to steal Johannes Vermeer's Girl with a Pearl Earring and use the profits to save their school from closure.

=== Television ===
- White Collar (2009–2014), Neal Caffrey, an art thief and suave con artist, teams up with FBI Agent Peter Burke to catch criminals using his expertise. However, throughout the course of the series, Neal continues to occasionally steal art under a variety of circumstances. Multiple seasons involve a plot arch that revolves around a cache of Nazi-looted art.
- Leverage (2008–2012), A crew of semi-reformed criminals form a Robin Hood-style organization that helps people no one else can help. Many members of the group have flashbacks to various instances of art theft in which they participated. At times, they are required to steal art in order to complete their jobs of aiding desperate people.
- The Blacklist (2013–2023), artwork and antiquities (stolen or otherwise) is often a big part, if not a central theme, to many episodes in the series. Raymond Reddington has also admitted to brokering many deals revolving around stolen art, sculptures, coins, and many other small items of artistic value during his time as a criminal mastermind.
- Cat's Eyes (2024), a drama series about three sisters from Paris who are art thieves trying to collect all the works belonging to their missing father while trying to discover the real reasons behind his disappearance.

=== Manga and anime ===
- Cat's Eye (1981–1985), a manga about three sisters who are formidable art thieves trying to collect all the works belonging to their missing father. It was adapted into a televised anime series originally broadcast from 1983 to 1984.

== See also ==
- Digital art theft
- FBI
- Interpol
- Kempton Bunton
- List of artworks with contested provenance
- List of stolen paintings
- Looted art
