= Robert Wittman =

Robert Wittman may refer to:

- Rob Wittman (born 1959), U.S. Representative for Virginia's 1st congressional district
- Robert King Wittman (born 1955), art-crime investigator
