= John Tillmann =

Canadian art thief

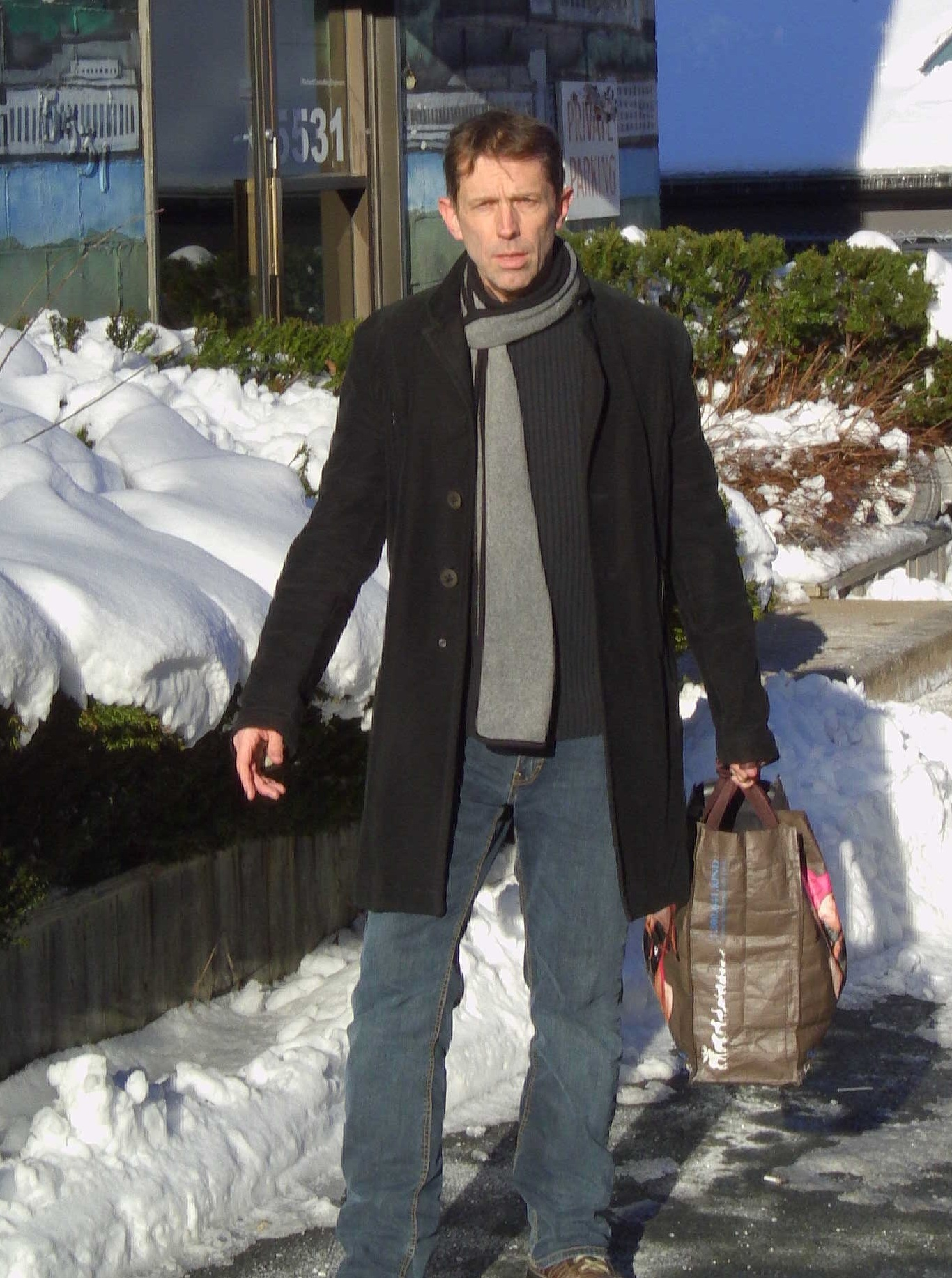
- Tillmann in 2016 shortly after release from a Canadian minimum security prison
- Born: February 24, 1961; John Mark Tillmann; Halifax, Nova Scotia, Canada
- Died: December 23, 2018 (aged 57); Canada
- Occupation: Art thief
- Known for: Stealing over 10,000 antiques and art objects

John Mark Tillmann (February 24, 1961 – December 23, 2018) was a Canadian art thief and white supremacist who, for over two decades, stole over 10,000 antiques and art objects from museums, galleries, archives, and antique shops mainly in Atlantic Canada.

Tillmann had an extensive criminal record for obscene telephone calls, shoplifting, threats, and assaults, but his antique thefts eluded authorities for years. He was eventually arrested with stolen property in January 2013, leading to a theft investigation by the Royal Canadian Mounted Police (RCMP) with assistance from Interpol, the Royal Newfoundland Constabulary, the United States Department of Homeland Security, and the Federal Bureau of Investigation (FBI).

Authorities seized over 3,000 artifacts from Tillmann's home in the first week of the investigation. Police closed the file nearly three years later; returning over 10,000 exhibits to their respective owners, including a 250-year-old George Washington spy letter valued at about a million dollars. A few weeks following the sensational bust, police ran out of room within their storage facilities to house the enormous amount of artifacts that were being recovered. A secret, climate-controlled warehouse was then rented by authorities to store Tillmann's looted artwork for the next three years. One of several private historical experts brought in by police to assist in the investigation remarked to the Toronto Star newspaper: "It was incredible...to lay it all out would have taken an airplane hangar. It's an unbelievable collection of materials." The eclectic collection included a film prop suit of armor, a 7000-year-old Native American stone gouge, oil paintings and watercolors, tapestries, rare books, sculptures, rare documents, and a trove of other miscellaneous items.

Tillmann was sentenced to nine years in prison by a Canadian court on September 25, 2013. The court seized over two million dollars of his assets under the proceeds of crime legislation. Tillmann was released on parole in November 2015, after serving just over two years of his sentence. After his death in 2018, at least two people — one a former RCMP constable and the other Tillmann's ex-girlfriend — came forward with stories about Tillmann's alleged extensive history of violence and harassment towards acquaintances, partners, and family members.

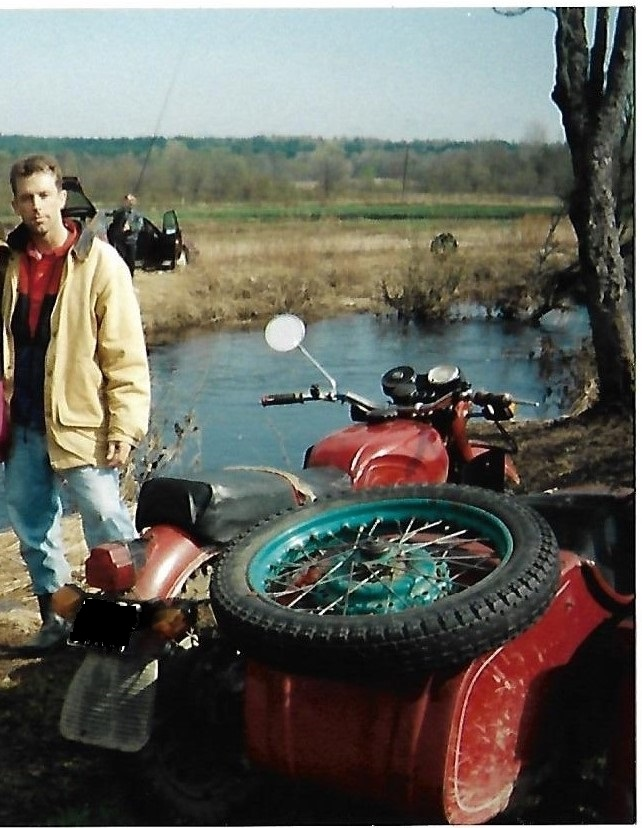
John Tillmann in Russia 1998

== Early life and political involvement ==
Born in Halifax, Nova Scotia in the 1960s, Tillmann grew up in the Halifax suburb of Fall River. He was a major political organizer for the Reform Party in the 1990s. He was campaign manager for their party candidate in the federal riding of Halifax-West during the tumultuous Canadian election of 1993. Tillmann made national headlines at the time for stating controversial views and strongly avowing white nationalism. As a university graduate majoring in international marketing and getting an MBA, he traveled to Russia in the 1990s and lived in the Izmaylovo District of northeast Moscow for several years. While there, he owned and operated street kiosks and learned to speak Russian. He was also involved in hotel business In Moscow, but had to give up due to extortion. He met his wife Oxana early 90s and divorced her few years later.

== Art thefts ==
Kuzina and her brother Vladimir became collaborators in Tillmann's heists. It is reported that Tillmann and Kuzina would sometimes take time out to have sex during some of their more risky heists. His team was regarded as criminal specialists, with Kuzina acting as a distraction, her brother Vladimir being an expert in computer hacking and alarm disabling, and Tillmann operating as the mastermind and main organizer of the countless heists they performed. Tillmann's sister said in an interview, "The guy is a genius, that's the way he's always been ever since he was a child." In November 2001, Tillmann incorporated a Canadian company called Prussia Import & Export Inc, which authorities believe he used to launder money that he and his wife earned from transactions in black market stolen artwork.

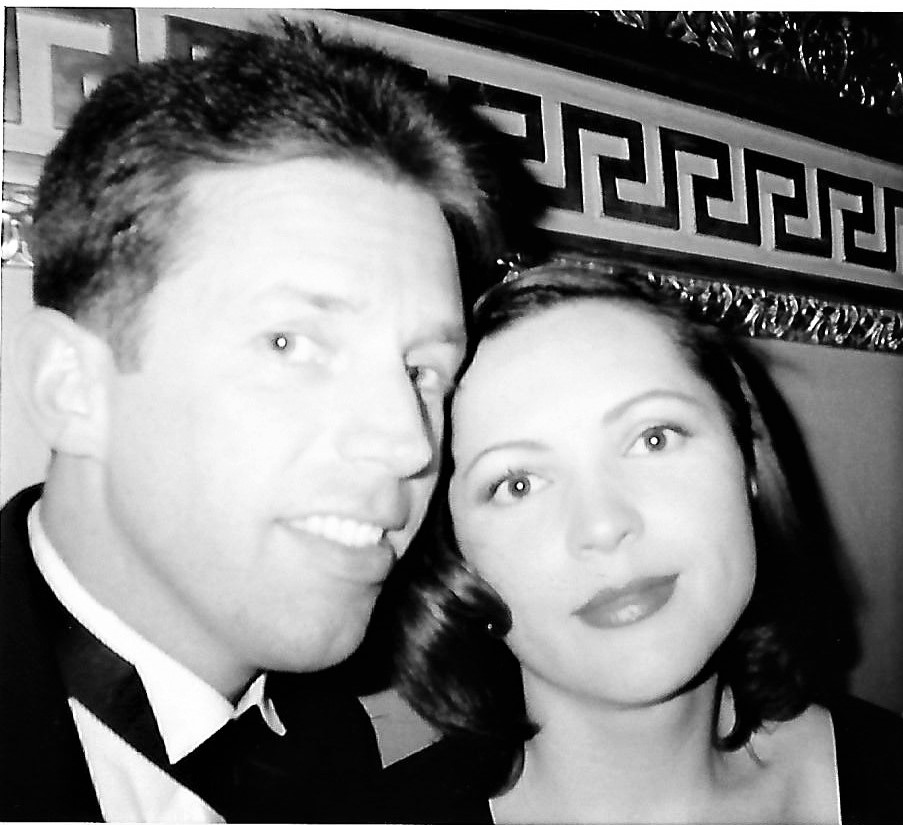
Tillmann and partner at a St-Petersburg Mariinsky theatre, 1998

Referred to as one of the most successful thieves in Canadian history, The Toronto Standard made comparisons of his real-life capers to that of the famous Hollywood heist film Ocean's Eleven. However, most of his solo thefts were from antique stores and museums in Atlantic Canada, where he used charm to gain trust and occasionally pretended to be maintenance staff. His theft ranged from rare books and precious documents to minor and low-value items.

Two special prosecutors were tasked with handling the huge and complex legal case, with one of them remarking of Tillmann: "He was clearly intelligent enough to amass a false empire over years... and it's a shame ultimately for him and for a society that he didn't use that to different ends."

One theft from a Canadian institution included a 150-year-old first-edition copy of Charles Darwin's book, On the Origin of Species. Valued at several hundred thousand dollars, the book was eventually tracked down by the FBI and U.S. Department of Homeland Security. It was returned to the Canadian government in a special ceremony at the Canadian Consulate in New York City in October 2015. John F. Prato, consul general of Canada in New York, praised RCMP and Homeland Security officers for their professionalism and cooperation throughout the Tillmann case. He remarked at the ceremony, "No two countries in the world have the relationship Canada and the U.S. have and today we honor two incredible law enforcement groups that worked hard and in partnership to recover this essential piece of history."

== Life after prison ==
Tillmann signed a book and movie deal with Nimbus, a Canadian publishing company with the book scheduled for release in September 2018. However, in 2019 CTV News announced that Nimbus would not be publishing the book, likely due to Tillmann's neo-Nazi views. As one example of his neo-Nazi tendencies, in early 2018, Canadian news outlets had reported that Tillmann managed to convince the Geographical Names Board of Canada in 1999 to rename a creek nearby to his house "Tillmann Brook"; he then took photos near the brook performing a Nazi salute.

Police and others have speculated that Tillmann may have stashed away large amounts of cash and artwork that have never been recovered. He was flagged on worldwide museum security bulletins and was listed on the official website of the United States Department of Homeland Security.

== Death and subsequent abuse allegations ==
He died on December 23, 2018. The cause of his death was not reported. Following his passing, numerous people who had previously interacted with Tillmann spoke to press outlets about his history of violence, intimidation, and abuse that particularly targeted women, Jews and other minority groups, and police. One retired RCMP constable from Nova Scotia said that "[Tillmann] was a violent individual who stole things to survive, that's who he was.... he was a bad guy," and alleged that Tillmann vandalized his property and stalked him and his family. An anonymous ex-girlfriend of Tillmann's disputed the idea that he was a 'charming art thief,' claiming instead he was "just – in my opinion – a psychopath." She alleged that following their breakup, Tillmann entered her apartment building, assaulted her, forced her into the car with her child, and made her withdraw money from ATMs to give to him. CTV Atlantic also reported on several other charges Tillmann previously faced concerning alleged threats and assaults towards his mother, a different ex-partner, and other family members.

== In popular culture ==
The Canadian television program The Fifth Estate aired a documentary on Tillmann in April 2016. There is talk in some circles of a movie being produced about his story. The lead police investigator for the Tillmann case was quoted as saying, "Stealing was how he got his thrills. He was a master of manipulation and I'm sure there will be movies made about this one day." He also referred to Tillmann as being smart and very cocky.
