= Stéphane Breitwieser =

French art thief and author (born 1971)

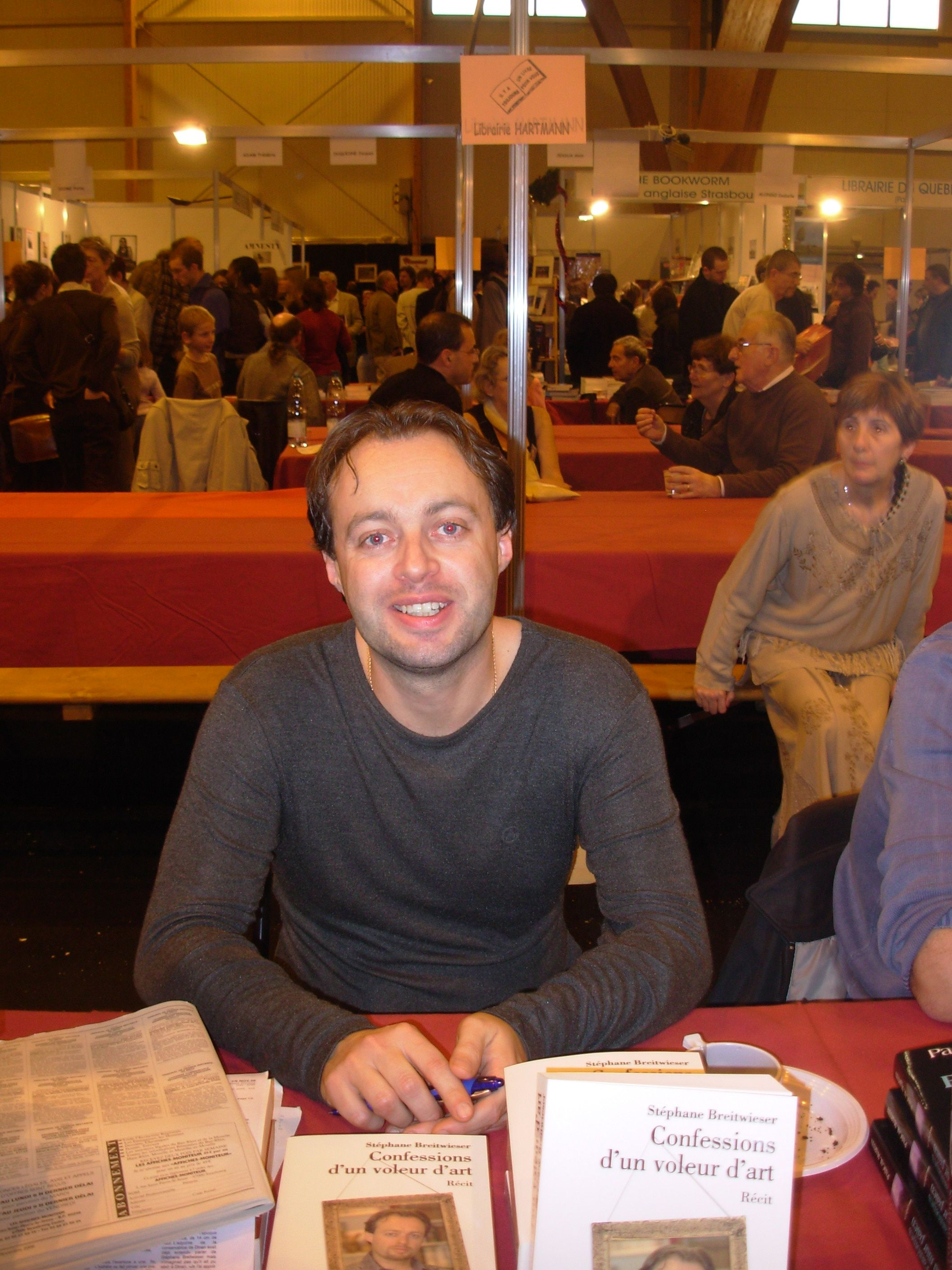
- Breitwieser at a book signing in 2006
- Born: 1 October 1971 (age 55); Mulhouse, France
- Occupation: Art thief
- Known for: Theft of around 239 artworks from 172 European museums between 1995 and 2001
- Penalty: 26 months imprisonment

Stéphane Breitwieser (born 1 October 1971) is a French art thief and author, notorious for his art thefts between 1995 and 2001. He admitted to stealing 239 artworks and other exhibits from 172 museums while travelling around Europe and working as a waiter, an average of one theft every 15 days. The Guardian called him "arguably the world's most consistent art thief". He has also been called "one of the most prolific and successful art thieves who have ever lived", and "one of the greatest art thieves of all time". His thefts resulted in the destruction of many works of art, destroyed by his mother to conceal evidence of his crimes.

He differs from most other art thieves in that most of his thefts initially did not involve profit motive. He was a self-described art connoisseur who stole in order to build a personal collection of stolen works, particularly of 16th and 17th century masters.

== Thefts ==
According to journalist Michael Finkel's 2023 book The Art Thief, Breitwieser's first theft was in early 1994 in Thann, a medieval town in northeastern France. Breitwieser stole an 18th-century flintlock pistol from the Museum of the Friends of Thann. The second theft, as reported in The Art Thief, took place in February 1995. At that time, Breitwieser stole a medieval crossbow from a museum in the Alsatian mountains.

His third theft was in March 1995 during a visit to the medieval castle at Gruyères, Switzerland, with his then-girlfriend Anne-Catherine Kleinklaus. He became entranced with a small painting of a woman by the 18th-century German painter Christian Wilhelm Ernst Dietrich, later saying: "I was fascinated by her beauty, by the qualities of the woman in the portrait and by her eyes. I thought it was an imitation of Rembrandt." With his girlfriend keeping watch, Breitwieser worked out the nails holding the painting in its frame and slipped it under his jacket. He would go on to use similar methods for thefts at other museums numbering at least 170 in the ensuing years. He would typically visit small collections and regional museums, where security was lax, and Kleinklaus would serve as his lookout as he cut the paintings from their frames.

The single most valuable work of art he stole was Sybille, Princess of Cleves by Lucas Cranach the Elder from a castle in Baden-Baden in 1995. In 2003 The Guardian estimated that its value at auction would be more than £5 million (£8.7 million or €10 million adjusted for inflation in 2023). He cut it from its frame at a Sotheby's auction where it was to be sold.

Breitwieser did not attempt to sell any of his large collection of art for profit at first; instead he enjoyed thinking about how he was "the wealthiest man in Europe." It was all kept in his bedroom in his mother's house in Mulhouse, France. His room was kept in semi-darkness so the sunlight would not fade the paintings. A local framer who reframed paintings for Breitwieser did not recognize the art as some of Europe's masterpieces. His mother, Mireille Breitwieser (née Stengel), thought the works had been bought at auction and only later suspected that he had not acquired them legitimately.

Eventually around 110 pieces from his collection have been recovered, leaving another 60 unaccounted for, presumably destroyed. His collection included:

- Pieter Brueghel the Younger - Cheat Profiting From His Master**, cut with scissors
- Antoine Watteau - Two Men*
- François Boucher - Sleeping Shepherd**
- Corneille de Lyon - Madeleine of France, Queen of Scotland**
- David Teniers - The Monkey's Ball**, shredded with scissors

*for those that were presumably destroyed, **for those that are known to be destroyed

== Capture ==
Breitwieser and Kleinklaus were first caught in 1997, when they walked off with a Willem van Aelst landscape from a private collection which they had been allowed to see with special permission from the gallery owner. Alerted to the theft, the owner ran out and recognized the two as they got into Breitwieser's mother's car. Another artifact was found in the car. Because it was his first offense in Switzerland, he was given only an eight-month suspended sentence and banned from entering Switzerland until May 2000. However, his job was in Switzerland across the border from France, and he continued working under his mother's maiden name. He also continued his thefts, even returning to museums of prior crimes to steal again.

In November 2001, he was caught after stealing a bugle dating from 1584, one of only three like it in the world and with an estimated value of £45,000, from the Richard Wagner Museum in Lucerne, Switzerland. A security guard spotted Breitwieser before he escaped, but he returned to the museum two days later. That day, a journalist, Erich Eisner, was walking his dog on the museum grounds when he noticed a man surveying the museum who seemed out of place, wearing a "nice overcoat." Aware of the recent theft, Eisner alerted the main guard on duty, who was the same guard who had seen Breitwieser during the heist. He alerted the authorities, who then arrested Breitwieser. Lucerne police awarded Eisner's dog a lifetime supply of food in appreciation of his help.

== Destruction of art ==
When Mireille Breitwieser heard of her son's arrest from Kleinklaus, who had been able to evade Swiss authorities, she proceeded to destroy many of the works Breitwieser stored at her house in Mulhouse: contemporary reports suggested she cut or carved them up, leaving the remains of the frames in the trash over several weeks and forcing the shredded paintings down her garbage disposal unit, but, as most of the paintings were on wooden panels, it seems more likely that they were, as she confessed, incinerated in a pyre in nearby woodland. She threw other stolen artifacts, such as vases, jewelry, pottery, and statuettes, into the nearby Rhône–Rhine Canal, where a few later washed up on the shore; most of the 107 pieces were recovered through dredging and diving work.

She stated that she destroyed the paintings out of anger at her son, but police believe she did it to destroy incriminating evidence against him and herself. She apparently had no knowledge of the large monetary value of the works.

It took Swiss authorities 19 days to acquire the international search warrant required to search Breitwieser's mother's house. His mother admitted to destroying the artwork some seven months later, after some pieces had washed up on the banks of the Rhine. A Swiss police officer said, "[N]ever have so many old masters been destroyed at the same time."

== Sentence ==
On 6 January 2005, Breitwieser attempted to hang himself in trial detention, but was stopped after another inmate alerted a guard. The next day he was sentenced to three years imprisonment by a court in Strasbourg but only served 26 months. He spent two years in prison in Switzerland before being extradited to France. His mother received a three-year sentence for destroying the artwork but served only 18 months. Kleinklaus, his ex-girlfriend, received 18 months for receiving stolen items but served only six. At his trial, the magistrate quoted him as saying, "I enjoy art. I love such works of art. I collected them and kept them at home." Despite the immensity of his collection, he was still able to recall every piece he stole. He interrupted the lengthy reading of his collection during his trial several times to correct various details.

In 2005, editor of the cultural section of the French newspaper Libération Vincent Noce published a book about Breitwieser and the investigation into his thefts, titled La collection egoiste (The Selfish Collector). In 2006 Breitwieser published a romanticized autobiographical book about his exploits, titled Confessions d'un Voleur d'art (Confessions of an Art Thief), in which he claimed to have stolen some 230 artifacts over about seven years.

In April 2011, the police discovered 30 more stolen works during a house search. This resulted in another three-year prison sentence for Breitwieser in 2013.

Breitwieser was placed under surveillance in 2016 after he tried to sell a paperweight on eBay that had been stolen from a museum in St. Louis. He was arrested again in February 2019. At his home the police found Roman coins from another museum, as well as pieces from Alsatian and German galleries. In his mother's home, €163,000 in cash was found hidden in buckets.
