= David Locke Hall =

American lawyer, Naval Intelligence officer, and writer

- Born: 1955 (age 70–71); California, United States
- Education: Dartmouth College
- Occupation: Attorney
- Website: Official website

David Locke Hall is a highly decorated former Assistant United States Attorney, Naval Intelligence officer, and author.

== Early life ==
Hall was born in California in 1955. He received a BA from Dartmouth College, an MBA from Yale, and JD and MA degrees from the University of Pennsylvania. After law school, Hall served as a law clerk to the Honorable Walter King Stapleton, United States Court of Appeals for the Third Circuit.

== Career ==
=== Assistant United States Attorney ===
Hall served for 23 years with the United States Department of Justice as an Assistant United States Attorney, retiring in 2013. He tried a large number of significant cases to verdict, including mobster Roy Stocker of the K&A Gang. Hall also prosecuted the Leath Cocaine Trafficking Organization, the leaders of which were involved in shooting Philadelphia Police Officer Donald McMullin.

A significant focus of Hall's prosecutorial career was the investigation and prosecution of weapons proliferation and technology transfer offenders. In the 1990s, he prosecuted the Armaments Corporation of South Africa (Armscor), Kentron, Fuchs Electronics, and others for violations of the Arms Export Control Act during the apartheid era. The ARMSCOR case was a significant point of contention between the United States and the Republic of South Africa because ARMSCOR and Kentron were state-owned corporations. After lengthy negotiations, the dispute was resolved by the pleas of ARMSCOR, Kentron, and Fuchs to criminal charges and the payment of fines in excess of $11 million.

From 2004 to 2009, Hall investigated and prosecuted Amir Hossein Ardebili, an Iranian arms procurement agent working in Shiraz, Iran, acquiring components for the F4, F14, and other military aircraft, as well as microchips for use in phased array radar. The years-long investigation resulted in an undercover meeting between Ardebili and U.S. agents on October 1 and October 2, 2007, in Tbilisi, Republic of Georgia, where Ardebili was arrested by Georgian authorities. He was extradited to the United States in January 2008. Ardebili pled guilty to violations of the Arms Export Control Act, International Emergency Economic Powers Act, smuggling, conspiracy and money laundering in May 2008. The Ardebili case is the subject of a book, Operation Shakespeare: The True Story of an Elite International Sting, written by John Shiffman.

From 2009 to 2013, Hall led the undercover investigation and prosecution of Xiang Li, a Chinese software pirate. Xiang Li's Chengdu, China-based operation sold over $100 million in cracked software products with multiple high-tech applications, including telecommunications, explosive simulation, aerospace, satellite tracking, and flight simulation. The undercover investigation led to a meeting on Saipan between federal agents and Xiang Li in June 2011. At that meeting, Xiang Li delivered 20 gigabytes of proprietary data hacked from a defense contractor. Xiang Li was charged with trafficking in more than $100 million in stolen copyrighted software. He pled guilty in January 2013 and in June 2013 was sentenced to 12 years incarceration.

Hall has testified before the Subcommittee on the Western Hemisphere, Committee on Foreign Affairs, United States House of Representatives on "Examining the Effectiveness of the Kingpin Designation Act in the Western Hemisphere."

Hall also served as the Special Prosecutor for the FBI Art Crime Team. During this time, he worked closely with FBI Special Agent Robert King Wittman. Hall negotiated the return of three stolen Norman Rockwell paintings from Brazil in 2001. In 2009, he led the successful undercover investigation and prosecution of Marcus Patmon, an art thief who sold stolen works by Picasso. Hall forfeited and returned to Iraq a collection of Mesopotamian artifacts in 2010. In 2011, Hall effected the return to Peru of a gold Moche monkey head (circa 300 A.D.) that had been looted from the royal tombs of Sipan. In 2013, Hall seized and forfeited the Rosenberg Diary, the long-lost diary of Alfred Rosenberg, Nazi propagandist and Reich Minister for the occupied eastern territories. The Rosenberg Diary is now part of the Holocaust Museum collection.

Hall retired from the Department of Justice in 2013 and joined the law firm of Wiggin and Dana as a partner.

=== Military service ===
Hall served in the United States Navy and Navy Reserve as an intelligence officer for thirty years. Commissioned in 1984, he retired at the rank of captain in 2015. He commanded three intelligence units and served with the Defense Intelligence Agency, the Office of Naval Intelligence, the Joint Chiefs of Staff, in addition to numerous Navy commands. He was a third-generation naval officer, his father having served as a Marine Corps officer with the Second Marine Division in World War II.

== Awards and recognitions ==
Throughout his career, Hall has received numerous awards in recognition of his outstanding professional and military service including:

2013- "Meritorious Service Medal" by the United States Navy

2012- "International Achievement Award" by the Department of Homeland Security

2010- "SAFE Beacon Award" by Saving Antiquities for Everyone

2008- "Excellence in Law Enforcement Award" by the Department of Homeland Security

2008- "Defense Meritorious Service Medal" by the Department of Defense

2004- "Navy and Marine Corps Commendation Medal" by the United States Navy

2000- "Joint Service Commendation Medal" by the Department of Defense

1998- "Director's Award for Superior Performance" by the Department of Justice

1997- "FBI Director Citation" by the Federal Bureau of Investigation

== Published work ==
2015- "CRACK99: The Takedown of a $100 Million Chinese Software Pirate" W. W. Norton

2015- "Stolen Cultural Property: A Risk Management Primer" (chapter co-author), "The Legal Guide for Museum Professionals (J. Courtney, ed.)", Rowman and Littlefield

1991- "The Reagan Wars: A Constitutional Perspective on War Powers and the Presidency" Westview Press
