= Toronto Standard =

19th-century Canadian conservative newspaper

The Toronto Standard
- Type: weekly
- Format: broadsheet
- Founded: 1848
- Ceased publication: 1849

The Toronto Standard newspaper was published in Toronto before the Canadian Confederation. It is listed among Toronto's early newspapers as the Toronto Standard and General Advertiser. It was a weekly conservative newspaper, published by James Northey, that advocated for Protestant Ascendancy. Founded in 1848, it closed in 1849.
