= James Twining =

British thriller writer (born 1972)

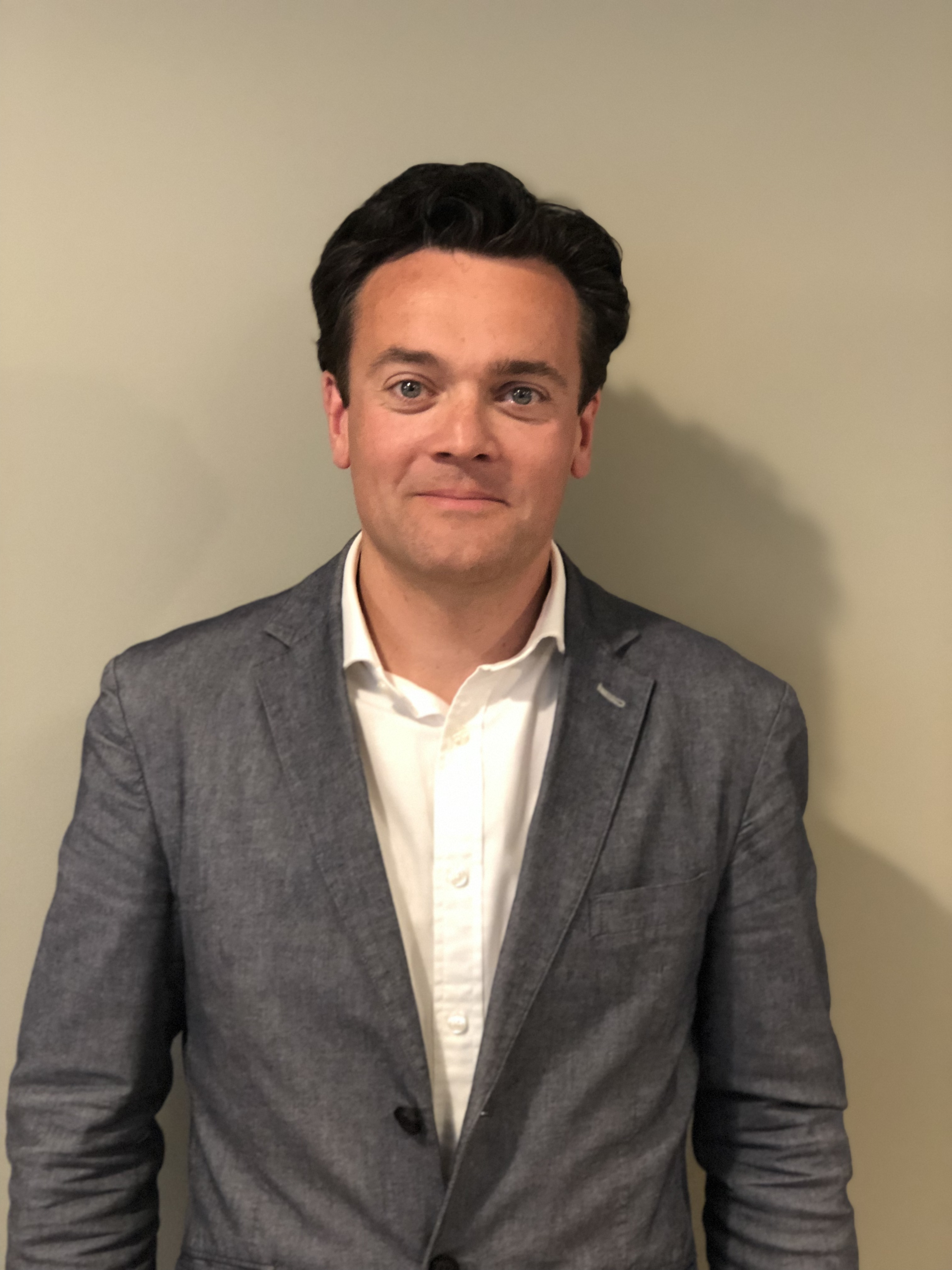
- Born: 13 December 1972 (age 53); London, England
- Education: Christ Church, Oxford
- Occupations: Novelist, business executive
- Writing career
- Genre: Thriller
- Website: www.jamestwining.com

James Douglas Robert Twining (born 13 December 1972) is a British thriller writer and businessman. He is the author of four novels featuring fictional art thief Tom Kirk. Twining serves as trustee and chair of the Audit and Risk Committee of the National Lottery Heritage Fund and the National Heritage Memorial Fund, is a governor of Merchant Taylors' School, Northwood, and is a director of Dunfermline Athletic Football Club.

== Early life and education ==
Twining was born in London and spent much of his childhood in Paris. He subsequently attended Merchant Taylors' School, before reading French Literature at Christ Church, Oxford, graduating with a First Class degree.

== Career ==
=== Business career ===
Twining began his career in investment banking, working in the Corporate Finance Department of SBC Warburg (now UBS), where he worked on hostile bids and defences and leveraged buyouts. In 1999, he co-founded GroupTrade, an e-procurement business. In 2001 Twining and his co-founder were named among eight "Best of Young British" entrepreneurs byThe New Statesman. GroupTrade was sold in August 2002.

He subsequently worked as a strategy consultant at McKinsey & Co and then joined the JLT Group plc as Group Commercial Director. He became chief executive of the Kingsbridge Group, a private-equity backed insurance broker which he sold in 2020. He joined Wren Sterling, a national firm of independent financial advisers, as CEO and chairman in February 2022. He is also CEO of Magnus Financial Discretionary Management, a sister company of Wren Sterling.

=== Writing career ===
Twining began writing thrillers in 2003 and was signed by the literary agency Curtis Brown. His first novel,The Double Eagle, was published by HarperCollins in the United Kingdom and the United States in 2005. Three sequels followed, all featuring art thief Tom Kirk:The Black Sun (2006), The Gilded Seal (2007) andThe Geneva Deception (2009). Each novel is set against the world of international art theft and builds a contemporary thriller around a series of historical events or artefacts.

In November 2015, the Tom Kirk novels were featured as a specialist subject on the BBC quiz programme Mastermind.

The Tom Kirk franchise has been acquired for television by Elizabeth Kesses of EJK Productions, who is co-producing the adaptation with Amblin Entertainment.

== Public roles ==
=== English Heritage ===
Twining was among the founding trustees of the English Heritage Trust when it was established as an independent charity in 2015. He served as a trustee until June 2022 and held the position of vice chairman. During his tenure he chaired the Investment and Fundraising Committees and sat on the Audit and Risk Committee. He also served as chairman of the English Heritage Foundation.

=== National Lottery Heritage Fund ===
Twining was appointed as a trustee and chair of the Audit and Risk Committee of both the National Lottery Heritage Fund and the National Heritage Memorial Fund for a term beginning on 1 December 2023. In August 2026, his first term was extended by six months, to 29 May 2027.

=== Merchant Taylors' School ===
Twining has been a governor of Merchant Taylors' School, Northwood since 2018. He chairs the Investments Committee and sits on the Nominations Committee. He is a liveryman of the Worshipful Company of Merchant Taylors.

== Personal life ==
Twining lives in London with his wife and two daughters.

== Bibliography ==
Title	Year	Publisher
The Double Eagle	2005	HarperCollins
The Black Sun	2006	HarperCollins
The Gilded Seal	2007	HarperCollins
The Geneva Deception	2009	HarperCollins
