= Cartel de Don Juan Tenorio =

1949 painting by Salvador Dalí

- Artist: Salvador Dalí
- Year: 1949
- Medium: gouache and watercolor on card
- Dimensions: 27.9 cm × 35.5 cm (11.0 in × 14.0 in)
- Location: Private collection

Cartel de Don Juan Tenorio (Spanish for 'Don Juan Tenorio poster') is a gouache and watercolor on card painting by Spanish surrealist artist Salvador Dalí, from 1949. It is held in a private collection. It is perhaps best known for its theft and return.

The painting achieved international coverage when it was stolen from the month-old Venus Over Manhattan gallery in New York City. Valued at $150,000, the painting was discovered missing from the gallery in New York's Upper East Side on June 19, 2012.

In spite of the presence of a security guard, a man wearing a checked shirt left the gallery with the painting hidden in a shopping bag at about 4 p.m. "We had him on tape and I don't know why the security guard didn't notice it. He was in the gallery for 14 minutes," said gallery owner Adam Lindemann.

In spite of the successful theft, the drawing was mailed back to the gallery from Greece. It was intercepted on June 29, 2012, at New York's JFK airport before it went through customs and returned for the last day of the 10-day show. Analysis of the mailing tube containing the painting discovered a fingerprint. Suspected thief Phivos Istavrioglou was lured back to the United States; he pleaded guilty and spent two weeks in jail and paid $9100 in fines before being deported.

== See also ==
- List of works by Salvador Dalí
