= Robert King Wittman =

FBI special agent

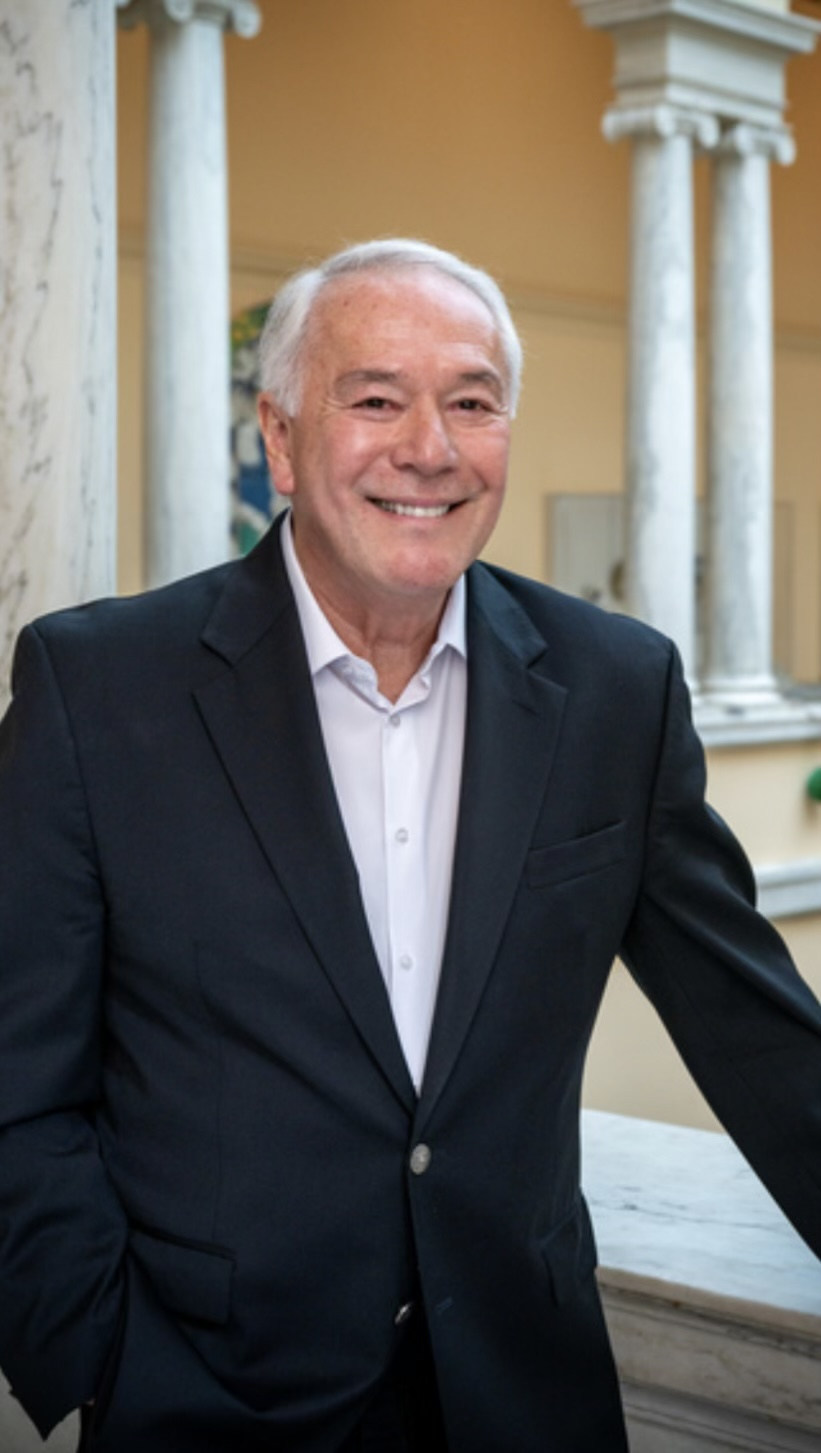
- Robert Wittman in 2024
- Born: 1955 (age 70–71); Tokyo, Japan
- Website: www.robertwittmaninc.com

Robert King Wittman (born 1955) is a former Federal Bureau of Investigation special agent who was assigned to the Philadelphia Field Division from 1988 to 2008. Having trained in art, antiques, jewelry and gem identification, Wittman served as the FBI's "top investigator and coordinator in cases involving art theft and art fraud". During his 20 years with the FBI, Wittman helped recover more than $300 million worth of stolen art and cultural property, resulting in the prosecution and conviction of numerous individuals.

In 2005, he was instrumental in the creation of the FBI's rapid deployment Art Crime Team (ACT). He was named the ACT's senior investigator and was responsible for instructing the newly formed team. He also was instrumental in the recovery of colonial North Carolina's copy of the original Bill of Rights in 2005, that had been stolen by a Union soldier in 1865. Wittman represented the United States around the world, conducting investigations and instructing international police and museums in recovery and security techniques. After 20 years with the FBI working against art theft, he worked as an art security consultant for the private sector. In 2010, Wittman published his memoir Priceless which recounts his career and activities while working for the FBI as an undercover agent.

== Early life and career ==
Wittman was born in Tokyo, Japan, in 1955, to Yachiyo Akaishi, a Japanese national, and Robert A. Wittman, who met Akaishi while he was stationed with the US Air Force in Tokyo during the Korean War. He came to the United States in 1957 and lived in Baltimore, Maryland, where his mother and father owned and ran an antique store. It was in this antique store that Wittman learned the business of art. He graduated from Calvert Hall College High School in 1973. Following high school, he attended Towson University and received a Bachelor of Arts degree in political science in 1980. Wittman initially found employment with a Maryland agricultural magazine where he learned how to be an effective salesman, a skill to which he attributes his success later in undercover stings. He married Donna Goodhand Wittman in 1982 and has 3 children. He joined the Federal Bureau of Investigation in 1988 and was assigned to the Philadelphia Field Division where he went into the field of tracking down stolen art. His reputation within the FBI for solving art theft cases grew during the 1980s and 1990s. In 2005 Wittman was instrumental in the formation of the FBI's Art Crime Team, the first of its type. He worked closely with federal prosecutors Robert Goldman and David Locke Hall.

== Major recoveries during Wittman's FBI career ==
=== Pennsbury Manor ===
Theft at Pennsbury Manor, the historical home of William Penn, founder of Pennsylvania. First prosecution and convictions under the federal Theft of Major Artwork Statute. Recovery: more than 30 historical items valued at over $100,000.

=== Bill Of Rights ===
Theft of one of the original 14 copies of the Bill of Rights stolen by a Union soldier in April 1865, and returned to North Carolina in 2005, 140 years later. Recovery: valued at $30 million.

=== Francisco de Goya ===
Theft of numerous paintings at a private estate in Madrid, Spain. Recovery: included seventeen paintings, including two by Francisco de Goya and valued at a maximum of $50 million.

=== Rembrandt Self Portrait ===
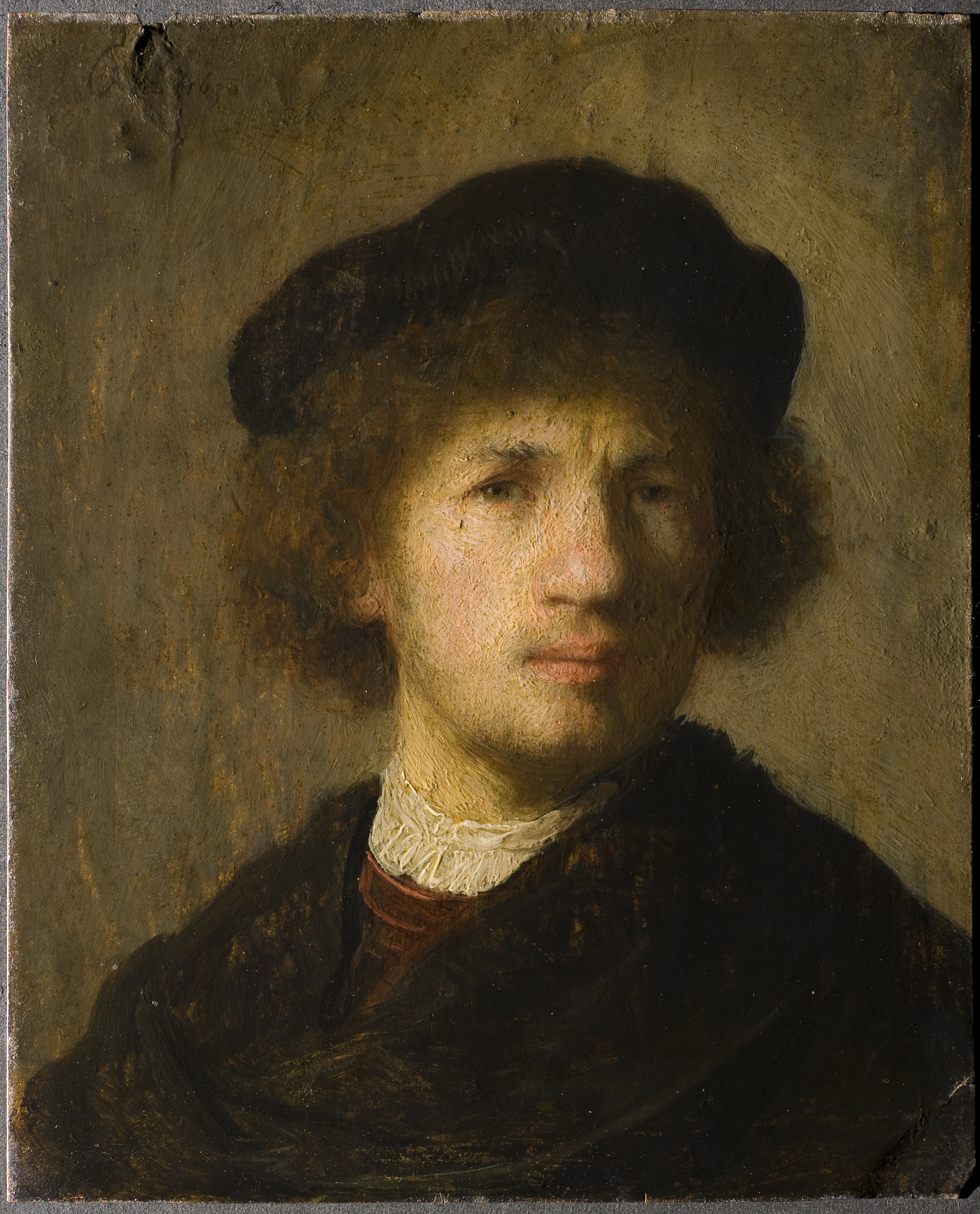
Rembrandt, Self-portrait, 1630, Swedish National Museum

Theft from the Swedish National Museum in Stockholm. Recovery: Rembrandt's 1630 Self-Portrait valued at $36 million. The small self-portrait on copper by Rembrandt stolen in an armed robbery in December 2000 was recovered in Copenhagen. Four men were arrested in a hotel in the Danish capital. The painting was undamaged and in its frame.

=== Norman Rockwell ===
Theft from a private gallery in Minneapolis. Recovery: five Norman Rockwell paintings worth $1 million from a farmhouse in Brazil.

=== Peruvian Backflap ===
Looting of the Royal Tomb of the Lord of Sipán in Peru. Recovery: extremely rare 2,000-year-old golden Pre-Columbian piece of body armor known as a backflap, which was worn as battle-armor and rank-decoration by warrior-priests of the Moche civilization. The gold, copper, and silver backflap was recovered in October 1997 by FBI agents in a sting operation after it was offered for sale at $1.6 million.

=== Geronimo's War Bonnet ===
Recovery of Native American Apache medicine man Geronimo's eagle feather war bonnet valued at $1.2 million.

=== The Tiffany Presentation Sword ===
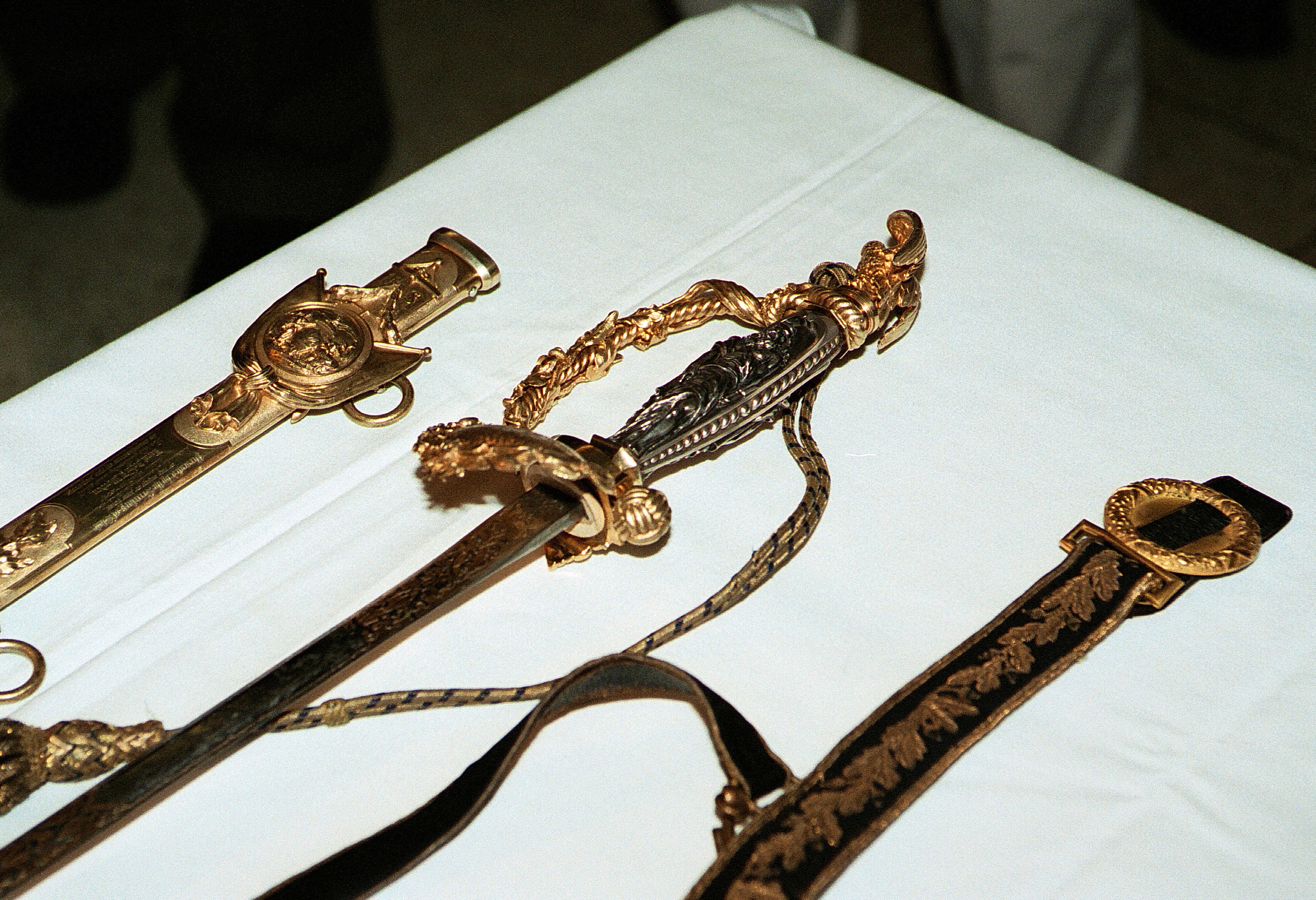
The recovered Tiffany sword

Theft from the U.S. Naval Academy in 1932 of an 1862 Tiffany presentation sword awarded to Admiral John Lorimer Worden, for his heroic command aboard the USS Monitor during its historic Civil War battle with the CSS Virginia (Merrimac). Recovery: the Tiffany presentation sword valued at $650,000.

== Presentations and art community partnership ==
Agent Wittman served as a member of the Department of State's Cultural Antiquities Task Force based in Washington, D.C. He has sought to educate others in the cultural property protection community in techniques on how to avoid becoming a victim of theft or fraud and the importance of prompt reporting. He has been the FBI spokesperson for art theft matters nationally and represented the United States at numerous international conferences regarding cultural property protection. Some of those venues are The American Association of Museums (AAM) Annual Conference; J. Paul Getty Museum; Philadelphia Museum of Art; Museum of Modern Art, New York; Museum of Fine Arts, Boston; Cambridge University, Cambridge, UK; International conferences in Romania, Poland, Russia, Belgium, and France.

== Awards and recognitions ==
Throughout his career Wittman has received numerous awards in recognition of his outstanding service with the Federal Bureau of Investigation.

- 2000- "Peruvian Order of Merit for Distinguished Service," presented by the President of Peru
- 2001- "Outstanding Contributions in Law Enforcement Award," presented by Attorney General John Ashcroft
- 2003- "White Cross of Law Enforcement Merit Medal" by the Spanish National Police
- 2004- "Robert Burke Memorial Award for Excellence in Cultural Property Protection" by the Smithsonian Institution at the National Conference on Cultural Property Protection
- 2010- "SAFE Beacon Award" by Saving Antiquities for Everyone

== Published work ==
Wittman tells the story of his career in the memoir Priceless: How I Went Undercover to Rescue the World's Stolen Treasures. It was published by The Crown Publishing Group in June 2010. Philadelphia Inquirer reporter John Shiffman was a co-writer.

In 2016, he published with co-author David Kinney, The Devil's Diary: Alfred Rosenberg and the Stolen Secrets of the Third Reich, about the lost diary of Alfred Rosenberg and the man who "stole" it, Robert Kempner.

== See also ==
- The Lost Leonardo, 2021 film in which King Wittman is interviewed
