= List of stolen paintings =

Many valuable paintings have been stolen. The paintings listed are from masters of Western art which are valued in millions of U.S. dollars. The US FBI maintains a list of "Top Ten Art Crimes"; a 2006 book by Simon Houpt, a 2018 book by Noah Charney, and several other media outlets have profiled the most significant outstanding losses.

== Unrecovered ==
Painting	Title, Artist	Date stolen	Location of theft	Details	Estimated value	Reward
	Infante and Dog by Diego Velázquez	May 15, 1970	Marseille, France	Stolen from a private residence during a burglary; no other paintings were stolen.	$1,000,000	
	Landscape with Cottages by Rembrandt van Rijn	September 4, 1972	Montreal Museum of Fine Arts, Montreal, Canada	A rare Rembrandt landscape stolen from the museum by armed robbers in 1972	$1 million at the time; estimated in 2003 to have appreciated to $5 million	$50,000
	Still Life: Vanitas by an anonymous artist in the style of Jan Davidsz van Heem	September 4, 1972	Montreal Museum of Fine Arts, Montreal, Canada	Among paintings stolen from the museum by armed robbers in 1972		
	The Concert by Johannes Vermeer	March 18, 1990	Isabella Stewart Gardner Museum, Boston, Massachusetts, United States	Main article: Isabella Stewart Gardner Museum theft The largest art theft in world history occurred in Boston on March 18, 1990, when thieves stole 13 pieces, collectively valued at $500 million, from the Isabella Stewart Gardner Museum. Among the pieces stolen was Vermeer's The Concert, which is considered to be the most valuable stolen painting in the world. A reward of $10,000,000 is still offered for information leading to their return.	Part of a $500,000,000 heist	$10,000,000
	A Lady and Gentleman in Black by Rembrandt van Rijn	March 18, 1990	Isabella Stewart Gardner Museum, Boston, Massachusetts, United States	Main article: Isabella Stewart Gardner Museum theft One of thirteen works stolen during the heist, the painting was crudely cut out of its frame and rolled up.	Part of a $500,000,000 heist	$10,000,000
	The Storm on the Sea of Galilee by Rembrandt van Rijn	March 18, 1990	Isabella Stewart Gardner Museum, Boston, Massachusetts, United States	Main article: Isabella Stewart Gardner Museum theft The Storm on the Sea of Galilee is a painting of 1633 by the Dutch Golden Age painter Rembrandt van Rijn that was in the Isabella Stewart Gardner Museum of Boston, Massachusetts, United States, prior to being stolen on March 18, 1990. The painting depicts the miracle of Jesus calming the waves on the Sea of Galilee, as depicted in the fourth chapter of the Gospel of Mark in the New Testament of the Christian Bible. It is Rembrandt's only seascape. It is widely believed, because of the fourteen people in the boat, that Rembrandt painted himself in the boat along with the twelve disciples and Jesus. The crewmember looking out towards the viewer of the painting has been suggested as being a self-portrait of Rembrandt.	Part of a $500,000,000 heist	$10,000,000
	Landscape with an Obelisk by Govert Flinck	March 18, 1990	Isabella Stewart Gardner Museum, Boston, Massachusetts, United States	Main article: Isabella Stewart Gardner Museum theft The largest art theft in world history occurred in Boston on March 18, 1990, when thieves stole 13 pieces, collectively worth $500 million, from the Isabella Stewart Gardner Museum. Among the pieces stolen was Landscape with an Obelisk, which had been attributed to Rembrandt. A reward of $5 million is still offered for information leading to their return.	Part of a $500,000,000 art heist	$10,000,000
	Man with a Pipe, by Jean Metzinger	1998	Wriston Art Center Galleries, Lawrence University, Wisconsin	Man with a Pipe (shown here in black and white half-tone) has been missing from Lawrence University, Appleton, Wisconsin, since 1998 (between 27 July and 2 August), having disappeared while in transit on loan.	$2,000,000	1,000,000
	Le chemin de Sèvres, by Jean-Baptiste-Camille Corot	May 3, 1998	Louvre, Paris, France	Stolen by visitor during open hours, the final piece of artwork stolen from The Louvre until 2025.	$1,300,000	
	View of Auvers-sur-Oise by Paul Cézanne	December 31, 1999	Ashmolean Museum, Oxford, England	View of Auvers-sur-Oise is a landscape painting by Paul Cézanne. It was stolen from the museum on the last night of 1999, during a celebration of fireworks.	$10,000,000	1,700,000
	A Cavalier by Frans van Mieris the Elder	June 10, 2007	Art Gallery of New South Wales, Sydney, Australia	Stolen by visitor during opening hours.	$1,000,000	
	Venus with a Mirror by Jacopo Palma il Giovane	February 11, 2010	Budapest, Andrássy 94 szám, Hübner Palace, Budapest, Hungary	Stolen on 11 February 2010 from Andrássy 94 szám, Budapest, Palace Hübner by robbers using force. Criminal case, Budapest Police - BRFK VI.ker. Rendőrkapitányság 010060/465/2010	$1 million at the time	
	Poppy Flowers by Vincent van Gogh	August 2010	Mohammed Mahmoud Khalil Museum, Cairo, Egypt	Poppy Flowers (also known as Vase and Flowers and Vase with Viscaria) is a painting by Vincent van Gogh with an estimated value of $50 million. The painting, which is of a vase of yellow and red poppies, contrasted against a dark background is a reflection of Van Gogh's deep admiration for Adolphe Monticelli, an older painter whose work influenced him when first he saw it in Paris in 1886. Egyptian officials erroneously believed they had recovered the painting only hours after its theft when two Italian suspects attempted to board a plane to Italy at Cairo International Airport. The same painting had been stolen from the same museum on June 4, 1977, and was recovered ten years later in Kuwait. The painting is small, measuring 65 x 54 cm, and depicts yellow and red poppy flowers. It is believed that van Gogh painted it in 1887, three years before his suicide.	$50–55,000,000	¥100,000,000
	Madeleine Leaning on her Elbow with Flowers in her Hair by Pierre-Auguste Renoir	September 8, 2011	Private residence, Houston, Texas	Stolen by armed robber at night	$1,000,000	
	A Soldier on Horseback by Anthony van Dyck	March 14, 2020	Christ Church Picture Gallery, Oxford, United Kingdom	Stolen at night along with two other paintings.		
	A Boy Drinking by Annibale Caracci	March 14, 2020	Christ Church Picture Gallery, Oxford, United Kingdom	Stolen at night along with two other paintings.		

== Rumored to be destroyed or lost ==
Painting	Title, Artist	Date stolen	Location of theft	Details	Estimated value	Reward
	Nativity with St. Francis and St. Lawrence by Caravaggio	October 16, 1969	San Lorenzo in Palermo, Sicily	The Nativity with St. Francis and St. Lawrence (also known as The Adoration) is a painting from 1609 by the Italian Baroque master Caravaggio. It was stolen on October 16, 1969, in Palermo, Sicily. The painting is large, measuring almost six square metres (actual size 268 cm x 197 cm) and hung above the altar. Probably because of its size, it was removed from its frame by the thief or thieves (two suspected) before being taken out of the church. After it was stolen, the Oratory was pillaged of other artworks, along with choir stalls of carved and gilded wood and benches inlaid with precious woods and mother of pearl.	$20,000,000	?
	Le pigeon aux petits pois by Pablo Picasso	May 20, 2010	Musée d'Art Moderne de la Ville de Paris	Main article: Musée d'Art Moderne de la Ville de Paris § 2010 theft Le pigeon aux petits pois (The Pigeon with Green Peas) is a 1911 painting by Pablo Picasso. It was one of five paintings stolen from the Musée d'Art Moderne de la Ville de Paris on May 20, 2010, which together are worth about €100 million ($123 million). The painting has supposedly been discarded, as one of the thief's accomplices, Jonathan Birn, who was supposed to keep it safe, claims to have destroyed it.	$28,000,000	?
	Still Life with Candlestick by Fernand Léger	May 20, 2010	Musée d'Art Moderne de la Ville de Paris, Paris, France	Main article: Musée d'Art Moderne de la Ville de Paris § 2010 theft Still Life with Candlestick (Nature morte au chandelier) is a 1922 painting by Fernand Léger. It was one of five paintings stolen from the Musée d'Art Moderne de la Ville de Paris on May 20, 2010, which together are worth about €100 million ($123 million). The painting has supposedly been discarded, as one of the thief's accomplices, Jonathan Birn, who was supposed to keep it safe, claims to have destroyed it.	$28,000,000	?
	The Just Judges by Jan van Eyck	April 10, 1934	Saint Bavo Cathedral in Ghent, Belgium	The Just Judges (145 × 51 cm) is the lower left panel of the Ghent Altarpiece, by Jan van Eyck or his brother Hubert Van Eyck. As part of the altarpiece, it was displayed at the Saint Bavo Cathedral in Ghent, Belgium, until stolen during the night of April 10, 1934, possibly by the Belgian Arsène Goedertier (Lede, December 23, 1876 – Dendermonde, November 25, 1934). The bishop of Ghent received a ransom demand for one million Belgian francs. On November 25, 1934, the thief revealed on his deathbed that he was the only one who knew where the masterpiece was hidden, and that he would take the secret to his grave. Although several people have claimed to know its whereabouts, the painting has never been recovered and is now believed by many to be destroyed. The panel was replaced in 1945 by a copy by Belgian copyist Jef Vanderveken.	Unknown	?
	Harlequin Head (Tête d'Arlequin, 1971) by Pablo Picasso	October 15–16, 2012	Kunsthal museum in Rotterdam	Main article: Kunsthal § Art theft Presumably burnt by an accomplice	Unknown	?
	Reading Girl in White and Yellow (La Liseuse en Blanc et Jaune, 1919) by Henri Matisse	October 15–16, 2012	Kunsthal museum in Rotterdam	Main article: Kunsthal § Art theft Presumably burnt by an accomplice	Unknown	?
	Waterloo Bridge, London (1901) by Claude Monet	October 15–16, 2012	Kunsthal museum in Rotterdam	Main article: Kunsthal § Art theft Presumably burnt by an accomplice	Unknown	?
	Charing Cross Bridge, London (1901) by Claude Monet	October 15–16, 2012	Kunsthal museum in Rotterdam	Main article: Kunsthal § Art theft Presumably burnt by an accomplice	Unknown	?
	Girl in Front of Open Window (Femme devant une fenêtre ouverte, also known as La Fiancée, 1888) by Paul Gauguin	October 15–16, 2012	Kunsthal museum in Rotterdam	Main article: Kunsthal § Art theft Presumably burnt by an accomplice	Unknown	?
	Self-Portrait (Autoportrait, circa 1889-91) by Meyer de Haan (Meijer de Haan)	October 15–16, 2012	Kunsthal museum in Rotterdam	Main article: Kunsthal § Art theft Presumably burnt by an accomplice	Unknown	?
	Woman with Eyes Closed (2002) by Lucian Freud	October 15–16, 2012	Kunsthal museum in Rotterdam	Main article: Kunsthal § Art theft Presumably burnt by an accomplice	Unknown	?

== Plundered by the Nazis ==
Painting	Title, Artist	Date taken	Location	Details	Estimated value	Status
	The Painter on His Way to Work by Vincent van Gogh		Stassfurt salt mines art repository near Magdeburg	Listed as "missing" on the Monuments Men Foundation for the Preservation of Art's website. Property of Kulturhistorisches Museum Magdeburg, Germany (formerly the Kaiser-Friedrich Museum).	inestimable	missing
	Portrait of Adele Bloch-Bauer I by Gustav Klimt	1940s	Austria	Portrait of Adele Bloch-Bauer I is a 1907 painting by Gustav Klimt. According to press reports it was sold for US$135 million to Ronald Lauder for his Neue Galerie New York in June 2006, which made it at that time the most expensive painting for about 4 months. It has been on display at the gallery since July 2006. Klimt took three years to complete the painting. It measures 138 cm × 138 cm and is made of oil and gold on canvas, showing elaborate and complex ornamentation as seen in Jugendstil. Klimt was a member of the Vienna Secession, a group of artists that broke away from the traditional way of painting. Adele Bloch-Bauer, in her will, asked her husband to donate the Klimt paintings to the Austrian State Gallery upon his death. She died in 1925 from meningitis. When the Nazis took over Austria, her widowed husband had to flee to Switzerland. His property, including the Klimt paintings, was confiscated. In his 1945 testament, Bloch-Bauer designated his nephew and nieces, including Maria Altmann, as the inheritors of his estate.	$135,000,000	Returned to Maria Altmann, niece of Adele Bloch-Bauer. See main article Republic of Austria v. Altmann
	Portrait of a Young Man by Raphael	1940s	Poland	Portrait of a Young Man is a painting in oil on panel, probably from 1513 to 1514, by the Italian High Renaissance Old Master painter and architect Raffaello Sanzio da Urbino better known simply as Raphael. The painting was plundered by the Nazis in Poland. The subject's identity is unverified, but many scholars have traditionally regarded it as Raphael's self-portrait. The facial features are perceived by specialists as compatible with, if not clearly identical to, the only undoubted self-portrait by Raphael in his fresco The School of Athens at the Vatican, identified as such by Vasari. If it is a self-portrait, no hint is given of Raphael's profession; the portrait shows a richly dressed and "confidently-poised" young man. In recent times, a book about Nazi plunder by Lynn H. Nicholas and a documentary film by the same title, The Rape of Europa, suggested that if the painting were to reappear today, it would be worth in excess of US$100M.	$100,000,000	Falsely reported to have been found 1 August 2012, the location is still unknown.
	En Canot, by Jean Metzinger	c. 1936	Kronprinzenpalais, Nationalgalerie, Berlin	En Canot (shown here in black and white) was exhibited at the Kronprinzenpalais, Nationalgalerie, Berlin, where it had been housed since 1927. The work was acquired by the Nationalgalerie in 1936 (on deposit by the Ministerium für Wissenschaft, Kunst und Volksbildung), where it was placed on display in Room 5. It was later confiscated by the Nazis around 1936, displayed at the Degenerate Art Exhibition (Entartete Kunst) in Munich and other cities, 1937–38, and has been missing ever since	$2,400,000	Missing, presumed destroyed
	Allegory of Christian Belief c. 1622 Johann Liss	1939	home of Jewish art collector Arthur Feldmann	in 1939 the Nazi Gestapo confiscated roughly 750 Old Master drawings from Feldmann after they invaded Brno in the present-day Czech Republic		at Cleveland Museum of Art in the USA, settlement with Feldmann family in 2013
	“Young Couple in a Landscape” by Georg Penz	1939	home of Jewish art collector Arthur Feldmann	in 1939 the Nazi Gestapo confiscated roughly 750 Old Master drawings from Feldmann after they invaded Brno in the present-day Czech Republic		The Penz was sold at Sotheby’s in 1946. The art collector Rosi Schilling donated it to the British Museum, which settled a Nazi spoliation claim from Feldmann's grandson in 2013.
	Portrait of a Lady by Giuseppe Ghislandi	c. 1940	home of Jewish art dealer Jacques Goudstikker	Confiscated after the German invasion of the Netherlands during World War II.		Painting was in possession of German SS officer Friedrich Kadgien, who took the painting with him to Argentina. It was spotted in an online photo of Kadgien's home after it was put up for sale by his daughters.

== Recovered ==
Painting	Title, Artist	Date stolen	Date recovered	Location of theft	Details	Estimated value
	Mona Lisa by Leonardo da Vinci	August 21, 1911	1913	Musée du Louvre, Paris, France	Further information: Mona Lisa § Refuge, theft and vandalism Now in the Musée du Louvre in Paris. The painting's continued and increasing fame was heightened when it was stolen. The Louvre was closed for an entire week to aid the investigation. Recovered after the thief, Vincenzo Peruggia, attempted to sell it.	Assessed in 1962 at $100 million. Adjusted for inflation, it would be worth $782 million today.
	Femme Assise by Pablo Picasso	July 1940	2012	Paul Rosenberg, Paris	One of around 450 paintings looted from the collection of Paul Rosenberg by the Einsatzstab Reichsleiter Rosenberg (ERR). Missing for over 70 years, it was discovered in the Munich home of Cornelius Gurlitt in 2012 and later returned to Rosenberg's heirs.	
	A Summer's Day (Un jour d'été) by Berthe Morisot	12 April 1956	April 1956	Tate Gallery, London	Stolen in broad daylight by Paul Hogan and Bill Fogarty to highlight Ireland's claim to the Hugh Lane bequest of 39 important works of art. The painting was returned anonymously several days later via the Irish Embassy.	£7m today
	Portrait of the Duke of Wellington by Francisco Goya	21 August 1961	July 1965	National Gallery, London	Stolen 19 days after it was put on display at the National Gallery by bus driver Kempton Bunton as a protest at the cost of the television licence. Bunton returned the painting in 1965 via the left luggage office at Birmingham New Street.	
	Ascension of the Prophet Elijah by Theodore Poulakis	1976	1978	Church of the Prophet Elijah in Ano Korakiana, Corfu, Greece	The work was stolen and cut into 9 pieces to be easily transported and sold by looters who were arrested several years later. The work suffered extensive damage and was transported to the Byzantine Museum for restoration.	
	Saint Jerome Writing by Caravaggio	December 29, 1984	August 4, 1988	St. John's Co-Cathedral, Valletta	Damaged after the burglars cut it out of its frame, and restored in 1990.	Total value $30,000,000
	Woman-Ochre by Willem de Kooning	November 27, 1985	2017	University of Arizona Museum of Art, Tucson, Arizona, U.S.	Cut out of its frame shortly after the museum opened that day. Sketches of a couple believed to be responsible were distributed widely but they were never identified; the couple in whose home the painting was found after their deaths in the 2010s has been suspected. Currently being restored.	Insured for $400,000 at the time of theft; however the market value of similar de Kooning works had increased to above $100 million by the time it was recovered and the museum believes it is worth $160 million today
	Bords de la Seine à Bougival by Camille Pissarro	February 1987	March 2009	Maastricht, Netherlands	Stolen with eight other paintings from art dealer Robert Noortman. One painting burnt, eight recovered (some damaged).	
	La Clairière by Auguste Renoir	February 1987	March 2009	Maastricht, Netherlands	Stolen with eight other paintings from art dealer Robert Noortman. One painting burnt, eight recovered (some damaged).	
	In the Omnibus by Honoré Daumier	Summer 1992	Redisplayed 2013	Hugh Lane Gallery, Dublin	Water colour unscrewed from wall during children's art class. Details of recovery not released.	£250,000 in 1992
	Rest on the Flight into Egypt by Titian	January 1995	August 2002	Longleat House, UK	Recovered undamaged in London	c.£10,000,000
	The Scream (Der Schrei der Natur) by Edvard Munch	1994 and 2004	1994 and 2006	National Gallery, Oslo and Munch Museum, Oslo	Further information: The Scream § Thefts The Scream has been the target of several high-profile art thefts. In 1994, the version in the National Gallery, Oslo was stolen. It was recovered several months later. In 2004, both The Scream and Madonna were stolen from the Munch Museum.	$110,000,000
	Portrait of a Lady by Gustav Klimt	February 22, 1997	December 2019	Galleria Ricci-Oddi, Piacenza, Italy	Believed to have been stolen shortly before a special exhibition was planned at the gallery in Piacenza. Recovered after 23 years hidden in the gallery wall in Piacenza.	€60 million
	The Gardener (or, Young Peasant) by Vincent van Gogh	May 19, 1998	1998	Galleria Nazionale d'Arte Moderna, Rome	Theft included two paintings by Van Gogh and one by Paul Cézanne. Recovered by the Carabinieri Art Squad a few weeks later.	Three paintings estimated combined value: $34 million
	Still on Top by James Tissot	August 9, 1998	August 17, 1998	Auckland Art Gallery, Auckland, New Zealand	Severely damaged when returned, later restored	$2,000,000
	Conversation by Pierre-Auguste Renoir	December 22, 2000	April 2001	Nationalmuseum, Stockholm	Stolen with a Rembrandt and another Renoir by armed raiders. Conversation was recovered in a drugs raid, the other two paintings were recovered in 2005.	
	Self-portrait with Beret and Gathered Shirt (‘stilus mediocris’) by Rembrandt	December 22, 2000	2005	Nationalmuseum, Stockholm	The small self-portrait on copper by Rembrandt was stolen from Nationalmuseum in Stockholm along with Renoir's A Young Parisienne and Conversation in an armed robbery in December 2000. It was recovered in Copenhagen. Conversation was recovered in Stockholm a few months after the robbery and A Young Parisienne was recovered in Los Angeles in 2006.	$37,000,000
	La Coiffeuse by Pablo Picasso	November 2001	December 2014	Musée National d'Art Moderne, Paris	The 1911 painting by Picasso was discovered missing from museum storage in November 2001. In December 2014, ICE officers seized the painting in Newark, New Jersey. The package, described as a Christmas gift worth $37, was being shipped from Belgium to a climate controlled facility in Queens, New York. The painting was returned to the museum in 2015 where it underwent five months of restoration before going on display in 2016.	$15,000,000
	View of the Sea at Scheveningen by Vincent van Gogh	December 7, 2002	September 30, 2016	Van Gogh Museum, Amsterdam, Netherlands	Recovered in Naples.	Part of a $30,000,000 art heist.
	Congregation Leaving the Reformed Church in Nuenen by Vincent van Gogh	December 7, 2002	September 30, 2016	Van Gogh Museum, Amsterdam, Netherlands	Recovered in Naples.	Part of a $30,000,000 art heist.
	The Boy in the Red Vest by Paul Cézanne	February 10, 2008	April 12, 2012	Foundation E.G. Bührle, Zürich, Switzerland	An 1894/95 painting (Venturi 681) depicting a boy in traditional Italian attire. Stolen along with three other pieces. It was the museum's most valuable painting. Recovered in Serbia.	$91,000,000
	The Taking of Christ by Caravaggio	31 July 2008	25 June 2010	Odesa Museum of Western and Eastern Art, Odesa, Ukraine	Further information: Theft of The Taking of Christ (Odesa) Stolen after burglars entered the museum through a second-floor window, removed the canvas from its frame without triggering the alarm system, and escaped across the roof. Recovered during a joint German–Ukrainian police operation in Berlin.	
	Count Lepic and His Daughters by Edgar Degas	February 10, 2008	April 2012	Foundation E.G. Bührle, Zürich, Switzerland	An 1870 painting stolen from Foundation E.G. Bührle in Zürich, Switzerland. Four paintings were stolen altogether with two of them being returned in 2008. Degas also painted Viscount Ludovic-Napoléon Lepic in the 1875 painting Place de la Concorde. Recovered in Serbia.	Part of a $162.5 million art heist
	Les Choristes by Edgar Degas	2009	February 2018	Musée d'Orsay, Paris, France (stolen while on loan to Musée Cantini, Marseille)	Recovered outside Paris.	€800,000
	Stammer Mill by Piet Mondrian	9 January 2012	2021	National Gallery, Athens, Greece	One of three paintings stolen from the Greek National Gallery in a 2012 heist. Recovered from a dry river bed near Keratea, East Attica, Greece.	
	Head of a Woman by Pablo Picasso	9 January 2012	2021	National Gallery, Athens, Greece	One of three paintings stolen from the Greek National Gallery in a 2012 heist. Recovered from a dry river bed near Keratea, East Attica, Greece.	
	Venus with a Mirror (sketch) by Titian	February 11, 2010	September 2021	Palace Hübner, Andrássy 94 szám, Budapest	Recovered via agreement	€1million
	The Parsonage Garden at Nuenen by Vincent van Gogh	March 30, 2020	September 11, 2023	Singer Laren Museum, Laren, Netherlands	Had been on loan from Groningen Museum	£5,000,000 (estimated)
	Portrait of Pietro Bembo by Raffaello Santi	November 5, 1983	January 1984	Museum of Fine Arts, Budapest, Hungary	Stolen alongside several other paintings from Budapest Museum of Fine Arts.	
	The Schoolmistress by John Opie	July 1969	January 11, 2024	Home of Dr. Earl Wood, Newark, New Jersey	Stolen by three men working under the direction of state senator Anthony Imperiale	
	A Rocky Coast, with Soldiers Studying a Plan by Salvator Rosa	March 14, 2020	April 19, 2024	Christ Church Picture Gallery, Oxford, United Kingdom	Stolen by thieves along with two other paintings, returned by a Romanian fence.	
	Still Life with Cherries by Paul Cézanne	March 22, 2026	August 14, 2026	Magnani-Rocca Foundation, Parma, Italy	Stolen by thieves along with works by Matisse and Renoir, recovered by the Carabinieri Art Squad along with the other works stolen from the museum.	$7,000,000
	Odalisque on the Terrance by Henri Matisse	March 22, 2026	August 14, 2026	Magnani-Rocca Foundation, Parma, Italy	Stolen by thieves along with works by Cézanne and Renoir, recovered by the Carabinieri Art Squad along with the other works stolen from the museum.	$23,000
	Fish by Pierre-Auguste Renoir	March 22, 2026	August 14, 2026	Magnani-Rocca Foundation, Parma, Italy	Stolen by thieves along with works by Matisse and Cézanne, recovered by the Carabinieri Art Squad along with the other works stolen from the museum.	$3,500,000

== See also ==
- Art Recovery Group
- Art theft
- Commission for Looted Art in Europe
- Looted art
- Monuments Men — Monuments, Fine Arts, and Archives program
- Nazi plunder
  - Gurlitt Collection — around 1,500 works amassed by Hildebrand Gurlitt
