= 2011 Montreal Museum of Fine Arts theft =

Crime in Canada

- Small marble bust in Egypto-archaicized style from 1st century CE Roman Empire still missing from museum
- Native name: Vol au musée des beaux-arts de Montréal en 2011
- Date: September 3 – October 31, 2011
- Venue: Montreal Museum of Fine Arts
- Location: Montreal, Quebec, Canada; 45.4987°N 73.5801°W
- Type: Art theft
- Arrests: Simon Metke, unidentified female
- Suspects: unidentified male
- Convicted: Metke
- Charges: 1 count of possession of stolen property over $5,000
- Sentence: Conditional discharge with probation and community service

The 2011 Montreal Museum of Fine Arts theft took place in two separate incidents during September and October of that year. In both instances, the same thief took a small ancient stone piece that was openly exhibited, without a protective case, and smuggled it out of the museum. One has since been recovered; however, the thief remains unidentified and the whereabouts of the other is not known.

On September 3, one day before the anniversary of the 1972 robbery of 18 paintings, a visitor took a sandstone Achaemenid Empire relief. In late October, he returned to take a Roman marble head from its pedestal. The two works were collectively valued at $1.3 million, with the relief accounting for almost all of that amount.

The museum did not disclose the theft until February 2012 to avoid compromising the joint investigation by its insurance company and Sureté du Québec's art theft unit. Security camera footage allowed them to obtain a description of the thief; investigators believed he was local. A reward was offered for the return of the works.

In 2013, police were led to Simon Metke, an Edmonton man who had bought the Achaemenid piece for CDN$1,400 during a visit to Montreal two years earlier, believing it to possibly be a replica, after it was seen on a wall behind him during a CBC interview unrelated to the case. The museum ultimately declined to buy it back from their insurer and it was put on the market in late 2016. Charges laid against Metke were disposed with a conditional discharge after he pled guilty to possession of stolen property. Metke's story inspired a character in Kevin Smith's 2016 film Yoga Hosers, as well as the film's title. The relief itself was later found to have been taken from Iran illegally, and returned there after being seized from a dealer's wares during a New York art fair.

== Thefts ==
On September 3, 2011, a visitor who came to the museum shortly after it opened removed a 20-by-21-by-3-centimetre (7.9 by 8.3 by 1.2 in) sandstone relief depicting a soldier's head, produced during the Achaemenid Empire, which ruled Persia during the 5th century BCE; it had been donated to the museum in the 1950s by Frederick Cleveland Morgan, heir to a department store fortune, art collector and philanthropist. It was small and secured to the wall it was on only by an anchor, and otherwise unprotected by glass. The museum staff has not been able to determine how it was removed. Coincidentally, the theft occurred on the day before the 39th anniversary of the only other theft from the museum, the 1972 robbery of 18 paintings, all but one of which are still missing, the largest art theft in Canadian history.

The thief returned approximately eight weeks later, in late October, at the same time of day. This time he took a 1st-century Roman marble head, approximately the same size, from its pedestal. Like the earlier piece, it was secured there by an anchor, but otherwise unprotected.

== Investigation ==
External videos
- Surveillance video showing suspect at museum

When it discovered the pieces, both of which were part of the museum's permanent collection, missing, the museum called the Sureté du Québec's (SQ) art theft unit, the only one in any Canadian provincial police force, and AXA, its insurance company, which also dispatched a team of art-theft specialists. They investigated the case jointly. After reviewing security camera footage and interviewing museum staff who had been on duty the days of the thefts, they identified a suspect, a man 5 feet 7 inches (170 cm) tall who wore a baseball cap and dark jacket as he walked around the museum. They believed he spoke French and lived in the Montreal area.

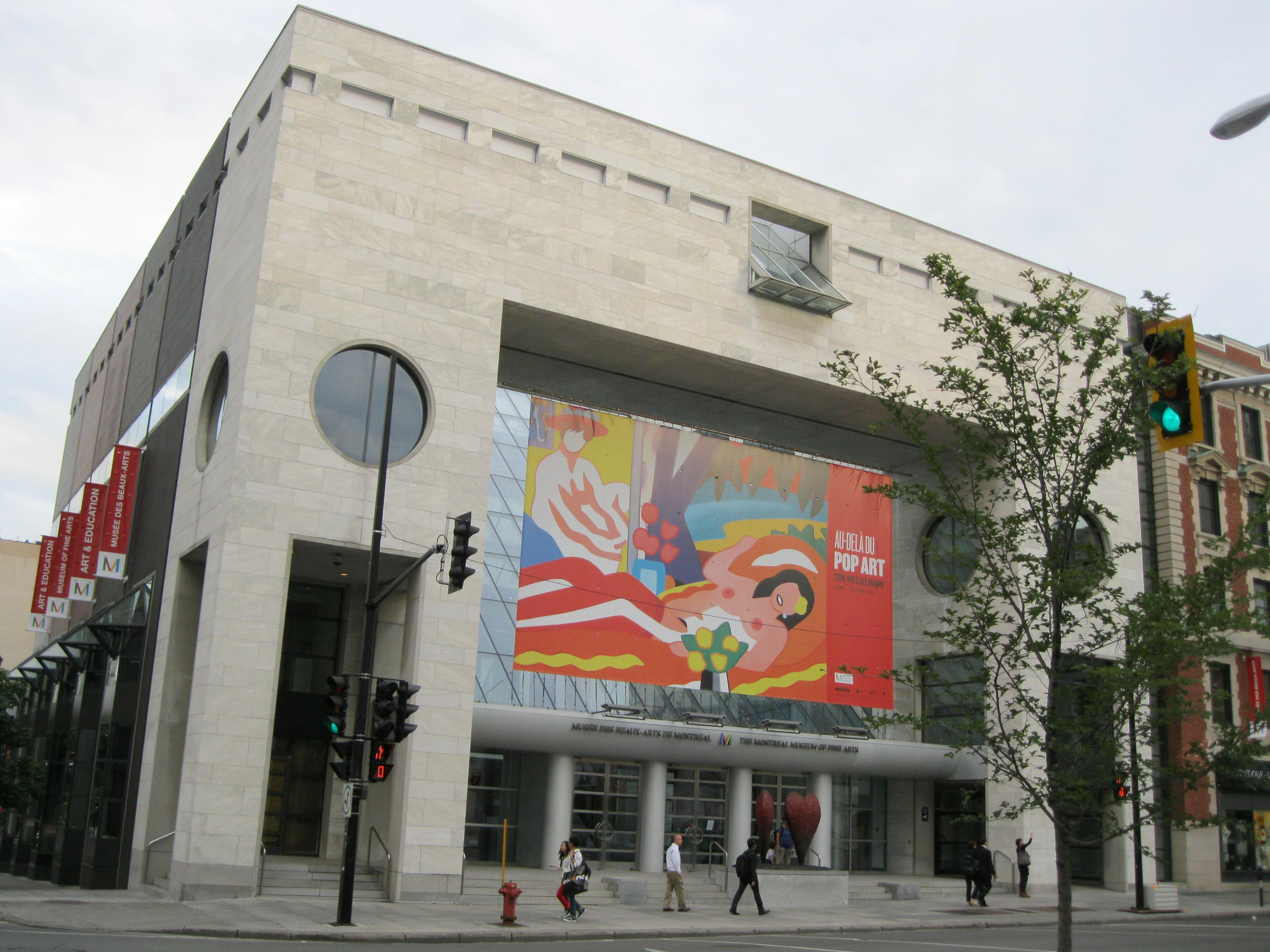
The Montreal Museum of Fine Arts in 2012

The museum did not publicly disclose the thefts until January 2012 in order to avoid compromising the investigation. When it did inform the news media, it released a description of the suspect and offered rewards for both the thief's identity and the safe return of the missing items. It put their combined value at $1.3 million, most of which was accounted for by the older, Achaemenid piece, with the Roman head valued at a mere $40,000.

John Fossey, an archaeologist, told CTV later that he believed the two pieces had not been stolen to order but simply because they were "small [and] easy to put in the bag." Another expert involved, art-theft investigator Mark Dalrymple, observed that the case was similar to a series of 2004 thefts from the Art Gallery of Ontario in Toronto, which also involved small objects taken by visitors while the museum was open to the public, objects whose return he had secured. He said the museum was preparing photos for dissemination worldwide. "[N]o matter where in the world these pieces go, no one can sell them", he told The Globe and Mail. He advised anyone in possession of the missing art to return it immediately.

=== Sale of relief ===
Unbeknownst to Dalrymple or any of the other investigators, by the time he made that statement at least one of the missing pieces had already been sold. In November 2011 Simon Metke, a yoga teacher from Edmonton, travelled to Montreal for a visit. A friend of his there had told him that someone he knew was selling what he described as a stone sculpture of a soldier, claiming it was a genuine antiquity. As a result of his own recent spiritual explorations, Metke had developed an interest in ancient cultures, and the friend thought he might be interested in buying the sculpture.

The stolen Achaemenid relief that Metke believed was merely a replica

When Metke finally saw the sculpture, actually the Achaemenid relief that had been stolen from the museum a few months earlier, he was at first skeptical. He believed it might actually be a replica, something that he might otherwise find at modern stores that sell home decor. But he appreciated the workmanship that had gone into it.

The seller's asking price was CDN$1,400. According to Metke's friend, the seller was motivated. "This other guy had to pay his child support you know and pay his rent," Metke recalled later. "He edged me on that it was worth a bunch more."

Still, Metke had some lingering doubts about the item. So he did a Google search on "Are there any Mesopotamian artifacts missing?" After he had satisfied himself from the results that he was not buying something looted or stolen, he bought the item, believing that, with 2012, the last year in the Mayan Calendar, a month away, it was his destiny to acquire the artwork. "It symbolized part of my spiritual journey to me."

He thought "it would have been kind of fun" to take it to an Antiques Roadshow production, or go to the Middle East himself and have it authenticated. For the time being, he packed the piece in his luggage and flew with it back to Edmonton, where the airline briefly lost the suitcase containing the relief upon his arrival. Once it was located, he took it home and put it in a meditation area he had set up in his living room.

Later he moved it to a shelf in his bedroom, where he put it amid a collection of Star Wars action figures, crystals and stuffed animals. A month after returning to Edmonton, he gave an interview to a CBC News crew for a story unrelated to the artwork he had just purchased. It was, however, visible on the shelf behind him in some shots.

== Recovery of relief and arrests ==
The interview eventually led to a tip to police. In late 2013 they obtained a warrant to search Metke's Edmonton condominium, and in January 2014 executed it. "The sun's coming in through the window, the bougainvillea flowers are glowing, the crystals are making rainbows," recalled Metke.

A team of Royal Canadian Mounted Police (RCMP) from both Alberta and Quebec, along with the SQ/AXA investigators, quickly located the relief. It was only then that Metke learned it had been stolen, and was indeed an authentic antique artifact 2,500 years old, not a replica. "I don't think he knew it was worth $1.2 million dollars either," he said of the seller. He felt, again, that it was destiny that had brought the relief to him. "[I]t sort of feels like it may have come to me to be protected so that it didn't get destroyed or lost."

At the time of the arrest, police suggested they had some leads on the identity of the thief. However, as of 2017 no arrests have been made. The whereabouts of the Roman head are also unknown.

Police charged Metke with possession of stolen property over $5,000 in value, possession of the proceeds of a crime, and possessing a controlled substance for the purpose of trafficking, after they also found drugs in the residence. Metke's girlfriend faced the former two charges related to the relief as well. Fossey, who was in Edmonton that day as well, flew home to Montreal with the relief that night. "It's a day I'll never forget, flying back with it in a box at my feet," he said later.

The museum, however, would have to consider whether to buy it back from AXA, since once it was recovered it became the insurer's legal property; commonly a buyback clause in the policy allows a museum to do this by returning the money paid. The board said it would meet to consider the possibility. It decided not to, and in 2016 it was offered for sale at the Frieze Art Fair for £2.2 million.

=== Return of relief to Iran ===
The relief was eventually purchased by British antiquities dealer Rupert Wace. He, in turn, offered it for sale at The European Fine Art Fair in New York's Park Avenue Armory in October 2017, until it was seized by prosecutors from the New York County District Attorney's office. The Iranian government claimed it had been taken from the ruins of Persepolis without permission in the 1930s, later than dealers assumed, after the government had passed a law severely restricting removals of antiquities from the country. A court soon ordered its return to Iran.

== Trial ==
The Crown later stayed two of the three charges against Metke, and all that it had laid against his girlfriend. In April 2017, he pled guilty to the possession of stolen goods charge. A statement of facts his lawyers agreed on with prosecutors said that while he clearly was unaware the relief had been stolen, he could have done more to assure himself of its provenance. In return the judge gave him a conditional discharge with probation and community service. Both sides described the case as "unique" and "extraordinary".

== Yoga Hosers ==
At the time of Metke's arrest, American filmmaker Kevin Smith discussed the story on his podcast, SModcast, amused by Metke's description of the bougainvillea and crystals that morning. His co-host, Scott Mosier, imagined how the RCMP might have spoken to Metke, saying "Open up, yoga hoser!" The last two words became a minor catchphrase among their fans.

In April, Smith announced he was working on a screenplay called Yoga Hosers. He completed the film in time for the January 2016 Sundance Film Festival. It was not based on Metke's story, but one character in the film, a yoga instructor named Yogi Bayer, was inspired by Metke. Justin Long, who played Bayer, attempted to contact Metke while preparing for the role; Metke did not respond until after Long had shot his scenes.

== See also ==
- 2011 in Canada
- Lost artworks
- Crime in Canada
- Timeline of Montreal history
- Theft of medieval art from Quedlinburg, by a US Army officer during World War II; after his death his descendants attempted to sell some of the pieces, unaware they were stolen, and were likewise arrested on charges that were later dropped
