= La Coiffeuse =

1911 painting by Pablo Picasso

- The Hairdresser (English)
- Artist: Pablo Picasso
- Year: 1911
- Medium: Oil on canvas
- Movement: Cubism
- Dimensions: 33 cm × 46 cm (13 in × 18 in)
- Location: Centre Pompidou

La Coiffeuse (English: The Hairdresser) is an oil on canvas painting by Pablo Picasso that he created in 1911. It was painted in the early Cubist style, known as Analytical Cubism, which Picasso pioneered. The painting has been valued at $15m (£10m). It was reported as stolen from Paris' Centre Georges Pompidou in 2001, but then recovered in a shipment from Belgium to Newark, New Jersey, in December 2014. It was returned to Centre Pompidou in 2015.

== Description ==
This oil on canvas painting was created by Pablo Picasso in the spring of 1911, and is an example of Picasso's Cubist artworks. It measures 33 cm x 46 cm.

== Theft ==
In 2001, La Coiffeuse, which had been bequeathed to the French government, was stolen from a storeroom of the Centre Georges Pompidou in Paris. In 2015, it was discovered wrapped in parcel paper in a shipment upon arrival in Newark, New Jersey. The painting had been sent by FedEx from Belgium and the sender had described it as an "art craft/toy" valued at €30 ($37). The shipping documents read "Joyeux Noël" (Merry Christmas). The package raised suspicions as it was being sent to a climate-controlled storage facility. After being verified for authenticity by French art experts, it was returned to the French embassy in Washington, DC. The painting was officially repatriated in a ceremony at the French embassy. It was returned to Centre Georges Pompidou but required five months of restoration due to poor storage conditions.

== Provenance ==
The painting was originally acquired by the art dealer Ambroise Vollard in the 1940s. It entered the collection of the Museum of Modern Art in 1967 as part of the bequest of Georges Salles.

== See also ==
- Portrait of Ambroise Vollard
- Le pigeon aux petits pois
- Cubism
- List of Picasso artworks 1911–1920
