= Nativity with Saint Francis and Saint Lawrence =

Lost painting by Caravaggio

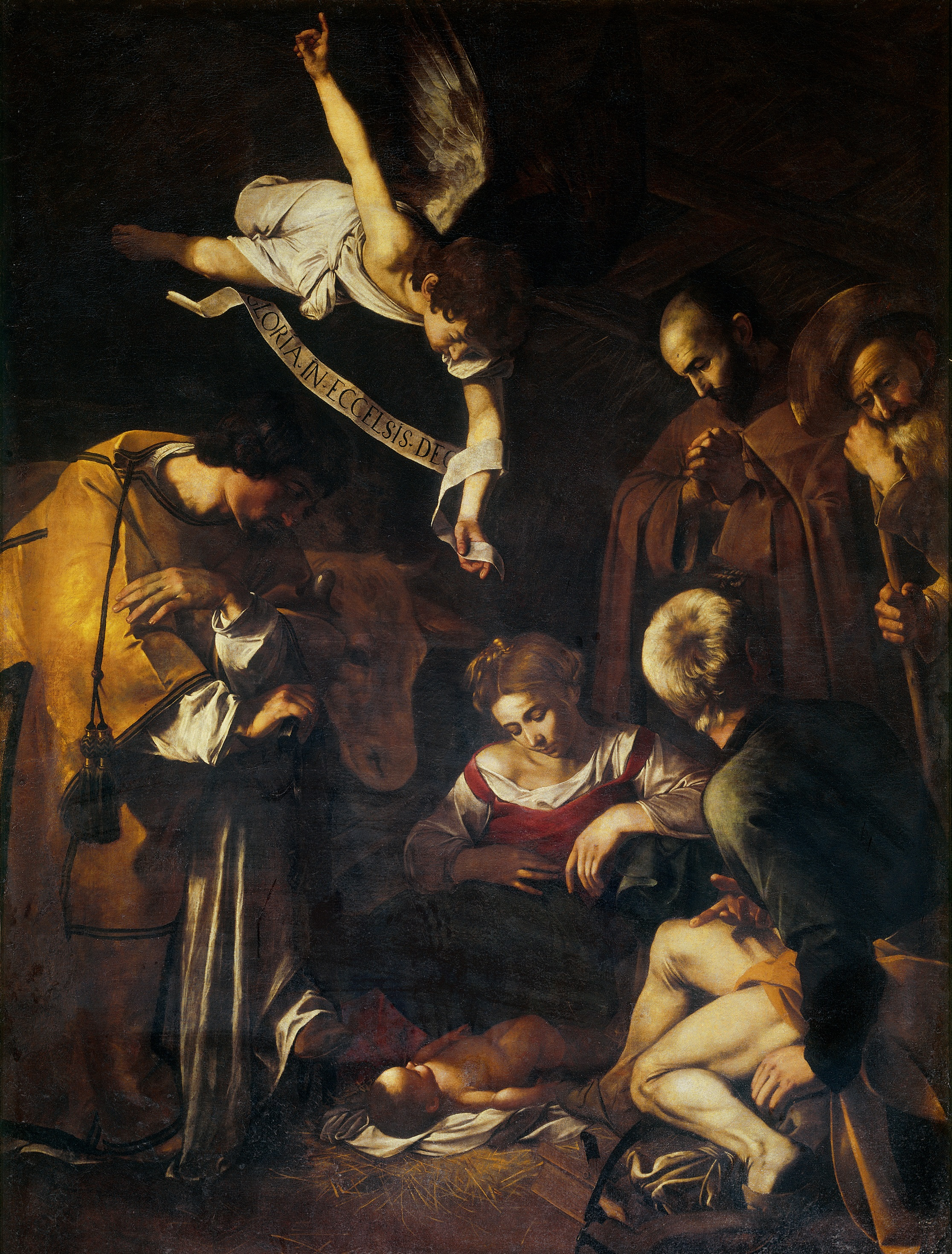
- Artist: Caravaggio
- Year: 1609
- Medium: Oil on canvas
- Dimensions: 268 cm × 197 cm (106 in × 78 in)

The Nativity with Saint Francis and Saint Lawrence is a painting of the nativity of Jesus from 1609 by Italian painter Caravaggio. It has been missing since 1969 when it was stolen from the Oratory of Saint Lawrence in Palermo. Investigators believe the painting changed hands among the Sicilian Mafia in the decades following the robbery and may still be hidden. A replica was commissioned in 2015, fabricated by Factum Foundation for Digital Technology in Preservation, and now hangs in the altar.

== Background and robbery ==
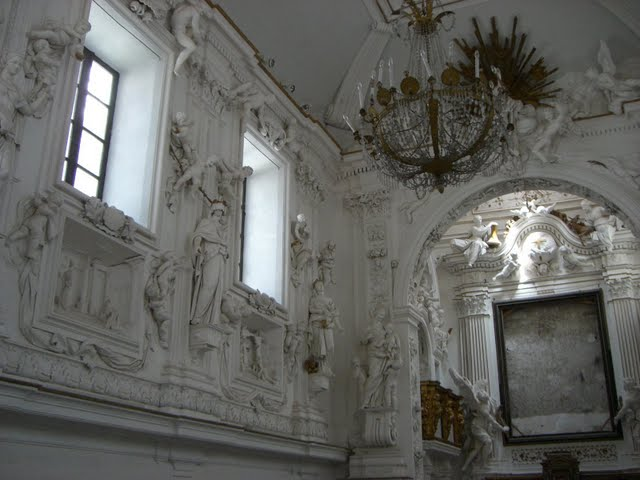
Interior of the Oratory of Saint Lawrence where the painting hung

The painting was completed by Italian painter Caravaggio in Syracuse in 1609 and later moved to Palermo. It was believed to have been painted in Sicily, one year before Caravaggio died. It depicts the nativity of Jesus, with saints Francis of Assisi and Lawrence, among other figures, surrounding Mary and the newborn Jesus. The painting is about 2.7 metres high and two metres wide. On the night of 17–18 October 1969, two thieves stole the painting from its home in the Oratory of Saint Lawrence in Palermo. They cut the painting from its frame, and also took a carpet from the oratory which authorities believe was used to roll up the painting.

== Investigation ==
The theft is considered one of the most significant art crimes in history. The United States Federal Bureau of Investigation (FBI) listed it among their "Top Ten Art Crimes" in 2005. Italian police, Interpol, and the FBI have all worked towards locating the painting. Its value has been variously estimated at US$20 million and £20 million; however, black market resale values are typically significantly less than fair market prices, at perhaps a tenth of its estimated value. As of 2005, Italian authorities believe the painting remains in Sicily and is hidden somewhere between Palermo and Bagheria.

Theories differ on whether the thieves were amateurs or professionals, but investigators generally agree that the Sicilian Mafia has largely been responsible for the painting's subsequent movements. One Mafia informant recalled seeing it being used as a floor mat by the Sicilian Mafia boss Salvatore Riina. Another account said that Riina showed it off at meetings.

In 2005, Mafia member Francesco Marino Mannoia told investigators that he was involved in the theft. He claimed that the painting was stolen on commission, and the private buyer wept and called off the sale when he saw how damaged it was from the robbery. Mannoia has not given clues to its location. A Carabinieri art protection unit in Rome believed Mannoia was recalling a different painting and devised another theory. They believe the robbery was carried out by amateurs who learned about the painting's value on a television program about artifacts in Italy that aired a few weeks before. Amazed at its value and knowing the altar was only guarded by an elderly janitor, they saw an opportunity to steal it. After the robbery, the Mafia learned of the theft and intercepted the painting. It was moved from boss to boss, including Rosario Riccobono, eventually reaching the hands of Gerlando Alberti. Alberti attempted a sale but could not complete it before being arrested in 1981. He supposedly buried the painting along with drugs and cash, but his nephew showed the burial location to authorities and no painting was present.

In 2009, Mafia informant Gaspare Spatuzza told authorities that when he was in prison with Mafia member Filippo Graviano in 1999, Graviano told him the painting was destroyed in the 1980s. According to Spatuzza, Graviano said the painting was given to the Pullara family in Palermo who hid it in a barn. Inside the barn, it was slowly destroyed by rats and pigs, and so was burnt. This story is doubted by some authorities.

In 2018, informant Gaetano Grado told authorities the painting was stolen by amateur criminals but then acquired by the Mafia and given to Gaetano Badalamenti, head of the Sicilian Mafia Commission. The informant claims Badalamenti sold the painting to a Swiss dealer and told him it would be cut into pieces for transportation. The dealer he identified is now deceased.

Some assert that the painting was sold to a collector in eastern Europe or South Africa. Another theory claims that it was destroyed in the 1980 Irpinia earthquake in southern Italy, shortly before a planned black market sale.

== Reproduction ==
In 2015, television broadcasting company Sky commissioned a replica to replace an enlarged photograph that hung in the altar. The replica job was handed to Factum Arte, a company known for using sophisticated technology to create high-quality replicas. They had previously done so with the tomb of Tutankhamun. The team used slides and photographs of the painting, including black-and-white glass plate negatives of the painting from its last restoration in 1951. Other Caravaggio paintings were examined so the company could replicate his style. Sky produced a documentary about the original painting and the reproduction. The completed replica was hung in the altar on 12 December 2015.

== Other versions ==
In 2022, at midnight on Christmas Eve, Vanessa Beecroft unveiled her "personal interpretation" of Caravaggio's Nativity with Saint Francis and Saint Lawrence at the Oratory of Saint Lawrence in Palermo, Sicily. The work will remain on display above the altar of San Lorenzo until 8 January and will then be exhibited in the ante-oratory until 17 October 2023.

== See also ==
- List of paintings by Caravaggio
- List of stolen paintings
