= 1972 Montreal Museum of Fine Arts robbery =

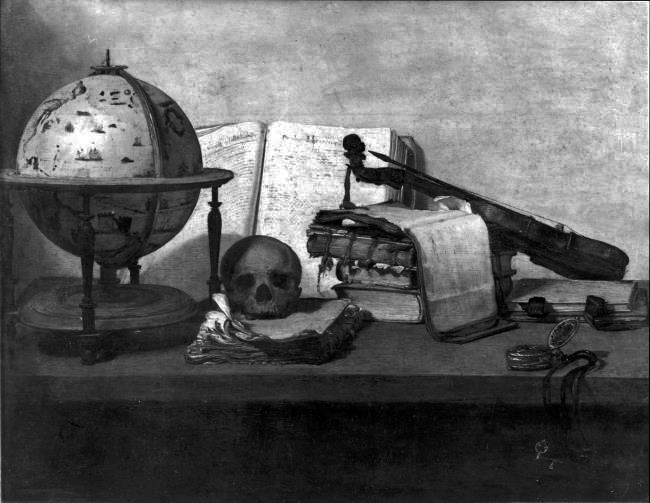
- An anonymous painting similar to Jan Davidsz van Heem's Still Life: Vanitas, among the stolen works
- Date: September 4, 1972
- Time: 12:30 a.m.
- Duration: 2 1/2 hours
- Venue: Montreal Museum of Fine Arts
- Location: Montreal, Quebec, Canada; 45.4987°N 73.5801°W
- Also known as: Skylight Caper
- Outcome: $2 million worth of paintings and jewellery stolen, only two pieces of which have been recovered
- Suspects: Three unidentified men

The 1972 Montreal Museum of Fine Arts robbery, sometimes called the Skylight Caper, took place very early in the morning of September 4. Three armed robbers used a skylight under repair to gain entry to the museum from its roof, tied up the three guards on duty, and left on foot with 18 paintings, including a rare Rembrandt landscape and works by (or attributed to at the time) Jan Brueghel the Elder, Corot, Delacroix, Rubens, and Thomas Gainsborough, as well as some figurines and jewellery. (Note: Exact counts of the total works stolen vary by source) The Brueghel, (later reattributed), and one of the stolen jewelry pieces, was returned by the thieves as an initiative to start ransom negotiations. None of the other works have been recovered. The robbers have never been arrested or even publicly identified, although there has been at least one informal suspect (now dead).

Collectively, the missing paintings have been valued at US$29.1 million in 2025; although their value may have diminished since the theft as scholars have called the attribution of some of the works into question. Nevertheless, the Rembrandt alone has been valued at $1.75 million; in 2003 The Globe and Mail estimated it to have appreciated in value to $20 million. The thieves appeared to know what works they were looking for. Many had been part of Masterpieces from Montreal, a travelling exhibition that had been to many museums in the U.S. and Canada prior to Expo 67, as well as some other special exhibits put on by the museum in the preceding years. It is not only the largest art theft in Canada but the largest theft in Canadian history.

Investigation of the crime proved difficult in the early going, since it occurred over the Labour Day holiday weekend, when many of the museum's officials including its director were vacationing far away from Montreal. It was further complicated by continuing news coverage of the Blue Bird Café fire, Montreal's deadliest arson, three days earlier, dominating the headlines; the next day the killings of Israeli athletes by Palestinian terrorists at the Olympics in Munich further dominated media coverage. A sting operation conceived after the thieves returned the Brueghel (later reattributed) and mailed photos of the other works to the museum seeking a ransom payment went awry; a later attempt to negotiate their return cost the museum CDN$10,000 with no results.

The thieves took advantage of weakened security, resulting from the renovations at the museum, which had left the skylight's alarm disabled. The renovations and the security flaws were themselves a consequence of the museum's tightening finances. During the 1960s many of the museum's supporters among the wealthy Anglophone community in Montreal began to leave for Toronto due to increasing concerns over Quebec separatism. The Montreal police, Sûreté du Québec, Royal Canadian Mounted Police and Interpol continue to investigate. Theories as to who might be responsible have ranged from the Montreal Mafia to separatists and art students.

== Background ==
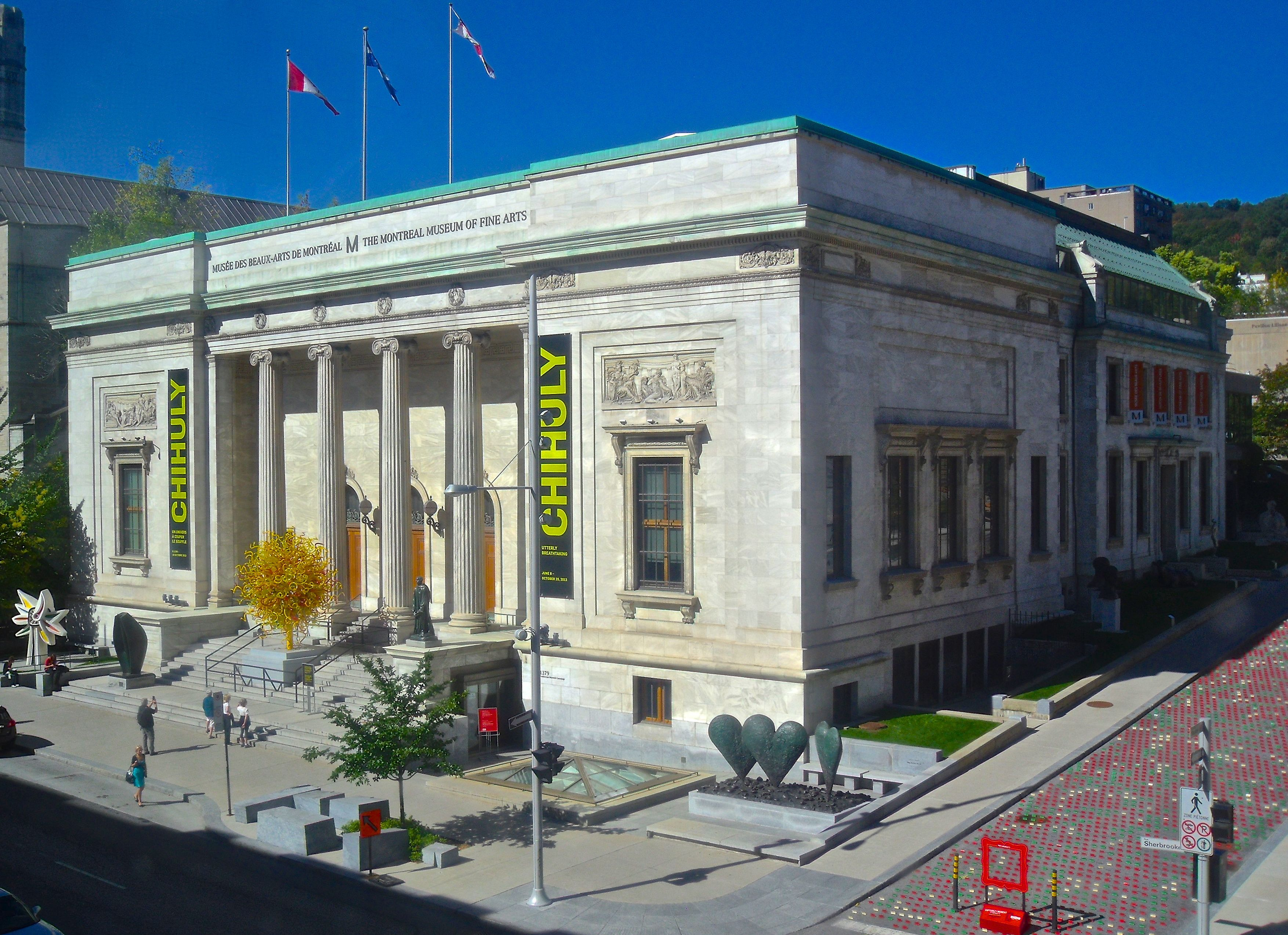
The 1972 MMFA robbery took place at this exhibition building, now known as the Hornstein Pavilion, pictured in 2013.

The Montreal Museum of Fine Arts (MMFA) was established in 1860, and for its first century the museum's patrons were predominantly of British descent and members of the city's Anglophone elite. Their political and economic domination began to yield to the majority Francophone population at the end of the 1950s and through the Quiet Revolution of the 1960s. The museum reached out to the Francophone population but the donations of new philanthropists did not yet equal that of their predecessors. Added to this was a financial crisis felt by many museums of the period, amid rising insurance and security expenses due to the increasing market price of works by the Old Masters.

The museum began receiving financial support from the municipal, provincial and federal governments and in the early 1970s it transitioned from a strictly private institution to a semi-public nonprofit organization. (Note: In June 1972, three months before the robbery, the museum had hosted Montréal plus ou moins, an exhibit of art curated by local activists, social collectives and protest-art groups, unusual for its time.) The museum was then able to finance a long-sought expansion, to renovate and modernize its 1913 Beaux-Arts building on Sherbrooke Street (today the museum's Michal and Renata Hornstein Pavilion), converting various auxiliary rooms into usable gallery space. The museum planned to close the building in 1973 for renovations.

=== Previous thefts and attempts ===
Twice in the museum's history works were stolen. In 1933, a thief hid in the museum overnight and passed 14 paintings to an accomplice through an open window. A torn painting was returned with a threat to destroy the others if ransom was not paid. Instead, a petty criminal confessed to the theft and led police to where the paintings were hidden. In 1960, a gang of armed robbers attempted to steal several van Gogh paintings which were on loan to the museum for a special exhibition. They were foiled and escaped, and were never identified.

== Robbery ==
Shortly after midnight on September 4, police believe, a group of three men went to the museum's west wall. One, wearing a pair of the pick-equipped boots used by utility-company workers, climbed a tree and got on to the roof. From there he lowered a ladder to the other two. They entered the museum through a skylight which had been covered by a plastic sheet, rendering the alarm inoperative, in the course of ongoing work. The three then slid down a 15-metre (50 ft) rope to the museum's second floor.

Around 1:30 a.m., one of the three guards on duty was walking to the kitchen to get some tea when he encountered two thieves, each about 168 centimetres (5 ft 6 in) tall. Their faces were covered by ski masks but their long hair was visible. One fired a shotgun into the ceiling to get the guard's attention and made him lie down. The other two guards were quickly overpowered. All three were taken to a lecture hall and bound and gagged. The captive guards recalled hearing, but not seeing, a third thief speak to others in French.

In the lecture hall, one robber stood guard while the other two removed paintings, jewellery and figurines from their displays and brought them to the museum's shipping department. The thieves seemed to have planned to leave via the same skylight, but concluded it would take too much time to put together a system of pulleys to get themselves and the stolen artwork out. After discovering that a guard had the keys to a museum panel truck, they decided to escape that way..

The thieves triggered a door alarm on exiting. Leaving half their take behind, they fled on foot down Sherbrooke.A n hour later, the guards freed themselves and called Bantey and the Montreal police(SPVM (Note: The acronym is based on the department's French name, the Service de Police de la Ville de Montréal)). Bantey arrived shortly after the police, along with Ruth Jackson, the museum's curator of decorative arts. After surveying the broken frames, smashed display cases and general disorder the thieves had left, they found that 18 paintings and 38 other pieces had been taken.

== Works stolen ==
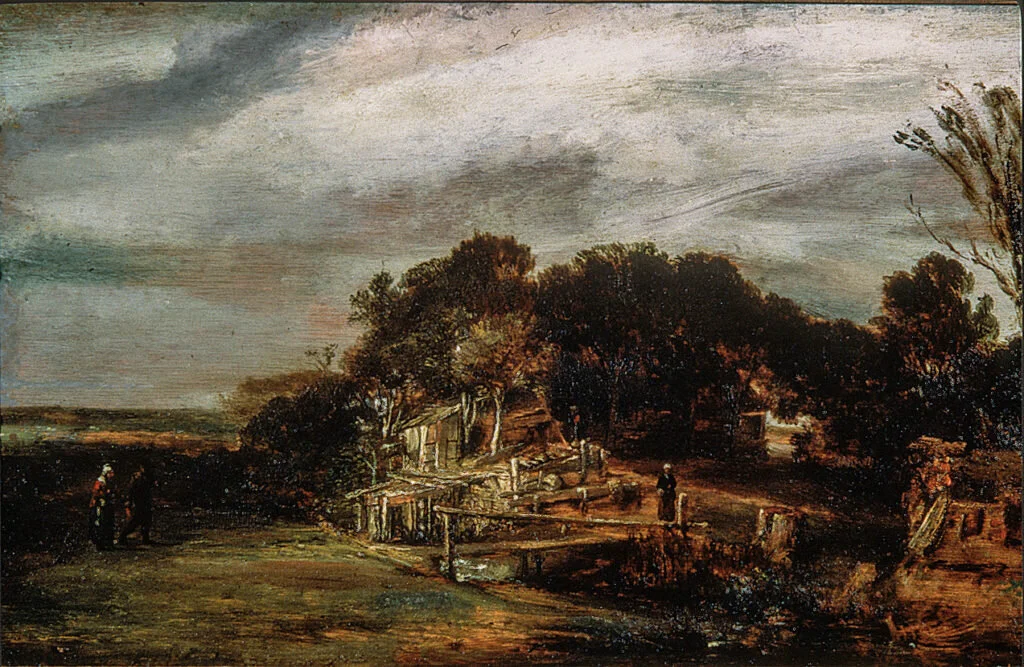
Rembrandt's Landscape with Cottages, the most valuable of the stolen works (although since the theft whether it is actually Rembrandt's work has been questioned).

All of the stolen paintings were by European artists from the 17th through 19th centuries:

- Landscape with Vehicles and Cattle, attributed at the time to Jan Brueghel the Elder but later reattributed to his students (subsequently recovered) (Note: There is disagreement in sources as to which of the Brueghel paintings was recovered. Sezgin states that it was Landscape with Buildings and Wagon while Noakes and Hampton state that it was Landscape with Vehicles and Cattle. Hampton explains, "there were conflicting reports about which of the pair was recovered, but museum staff assured me that this is the work currently in their holdings".)
- Landscape with Buildings and Wagon, Brueghel
- La rêveuse á la fontaine (The Dreaming Woman at the Fountain), Jean-Baptiste-Camille Corot
- Jeune fille accoudée sur le bras gauche (Young Girl Leaning on Her Left Arm), Corot
- Landscape with rocks and stream, Gustave Courbet
- Head, Honoré Daumier
- Lioness and Lion in a Cave, Eugène Delacroix
- The Sorceress, Narcisse Virgilio Díaz
- Portrait of Brigadier General Sir Thomas Fletcher, attributed to Thomas Gainsborough but possibly by Joshua Reynolds
- An anonymous copy of Jan Davidsz de Heem's Still Life: Vanitas
- Still Life with a Fish, de Heem
- La barrateuse (Young Woman Churning), Jean-François Millet
- Portrait of Madame Millet, Millet
- Portrait of a Man, possibly a self-portrait, Giovanni Battista Piazzetta
- Landscape with Cottages, Rembrandt van Rijn
- Head of a Young Man, Peter Paul Rubens
- Portrait of a Lady, François-André Vincent
- Portrait of a Man, Vincent
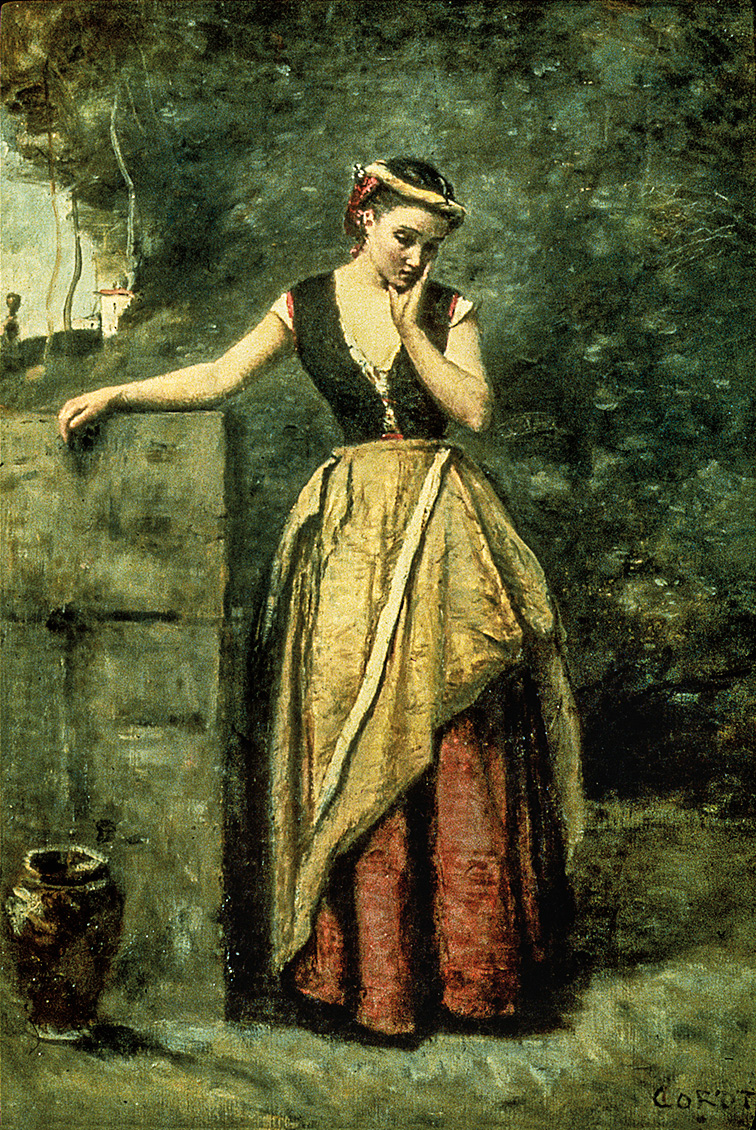
The Dreamer at the Fountain

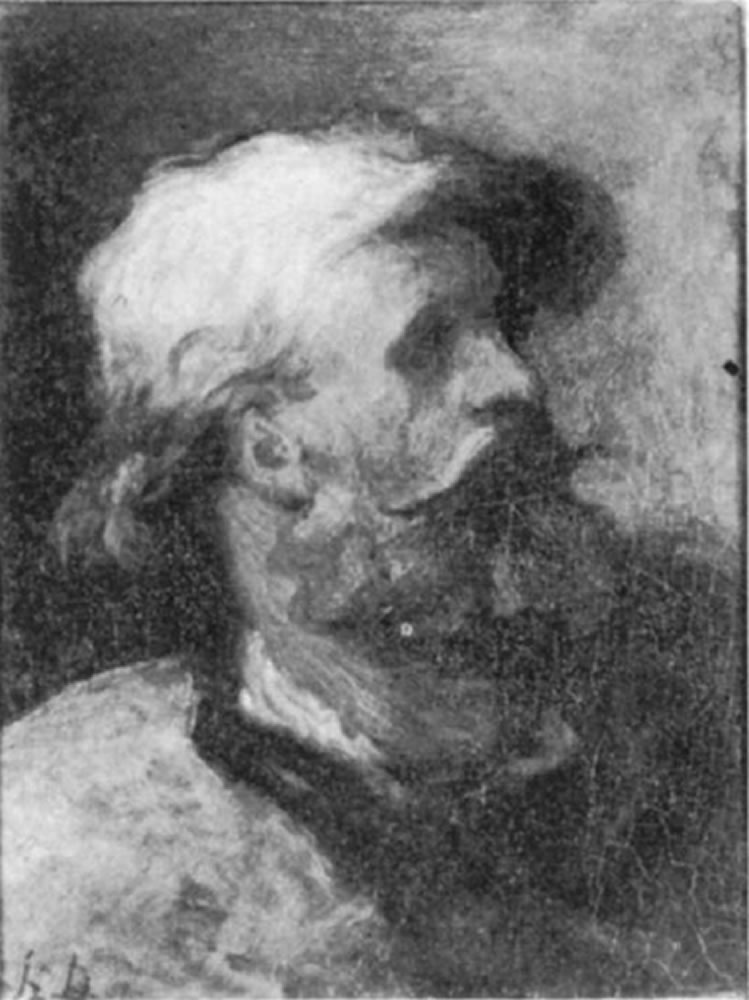
Head

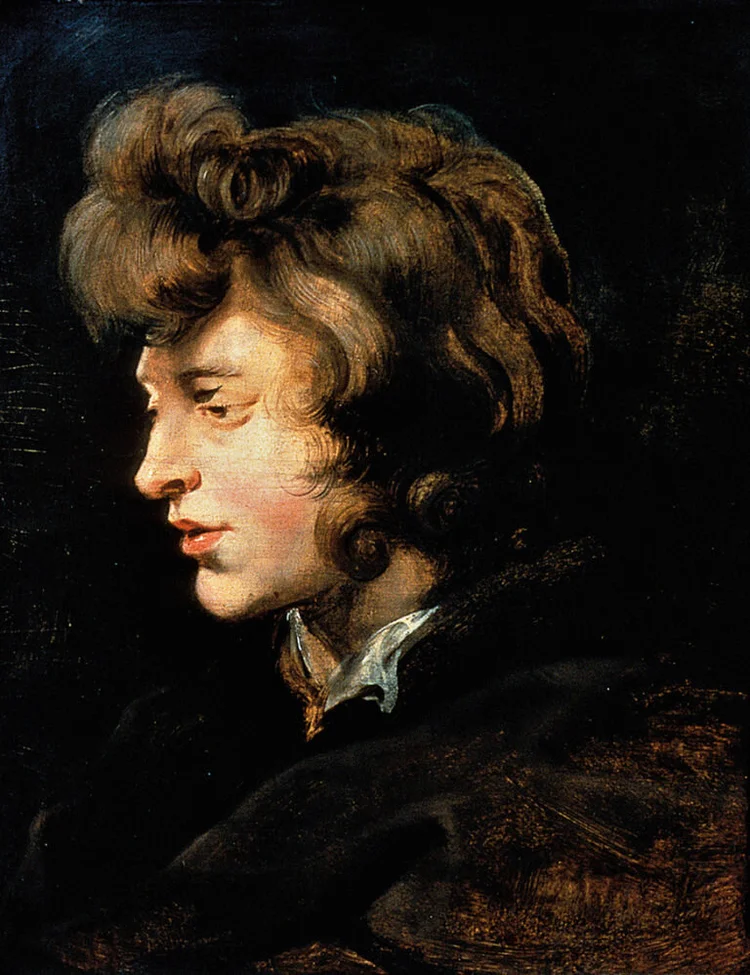
Head of a Young Man

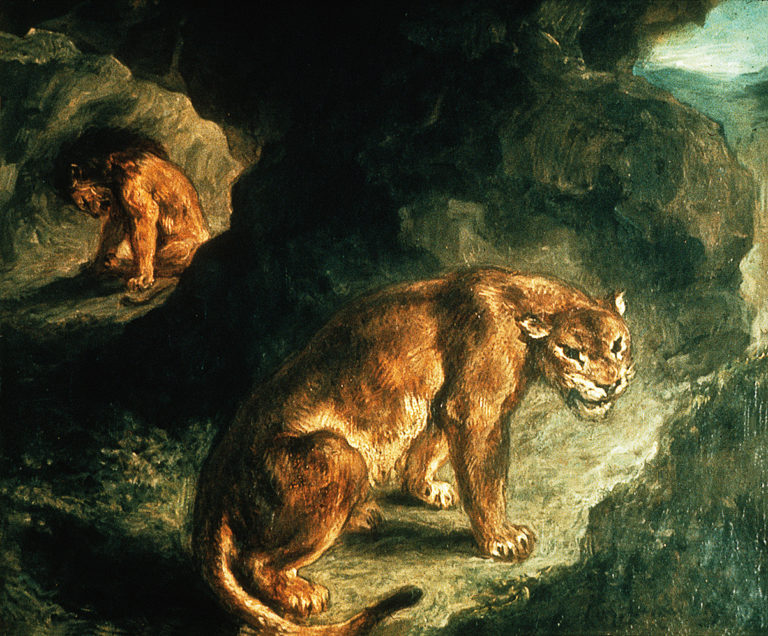
Lioness and Lion in a Cave

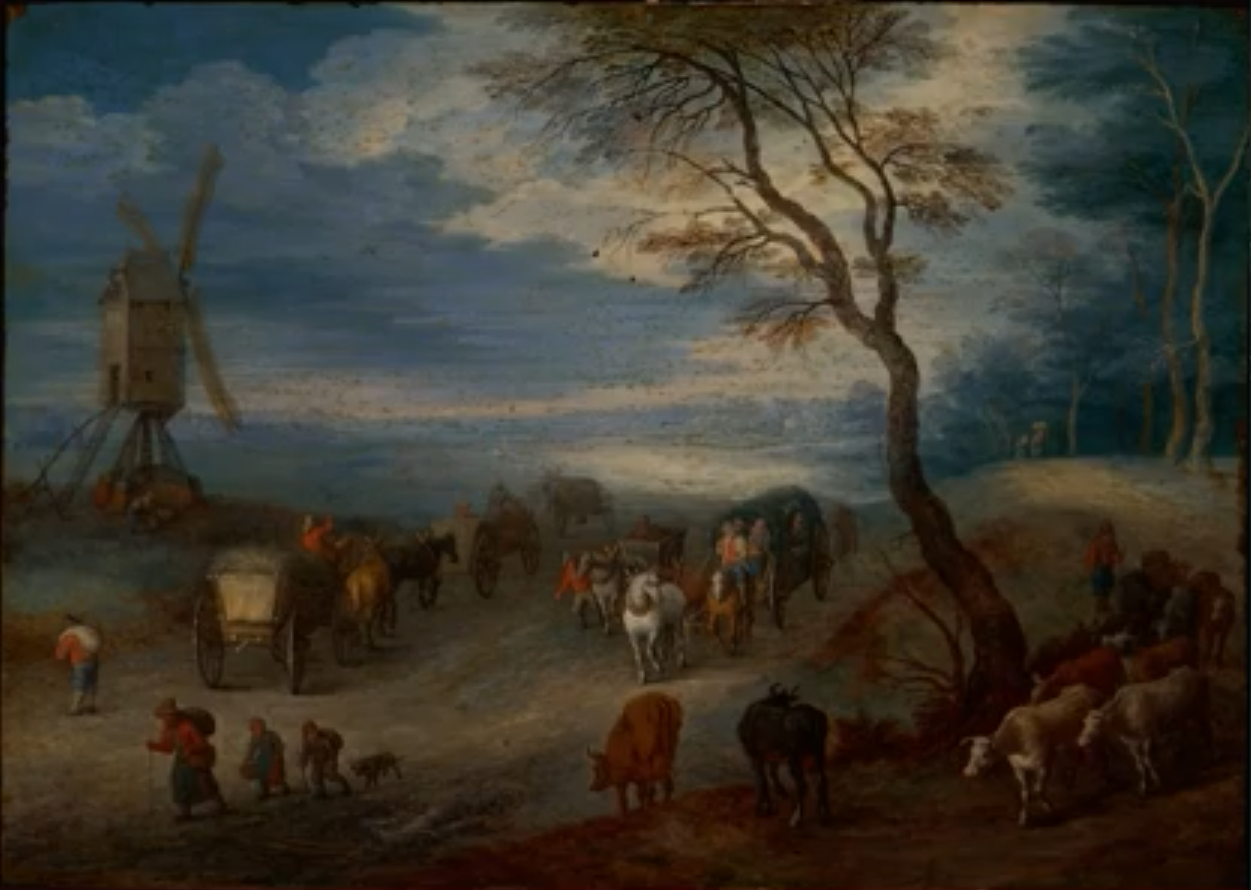
Landscape with Cattle and Wagons

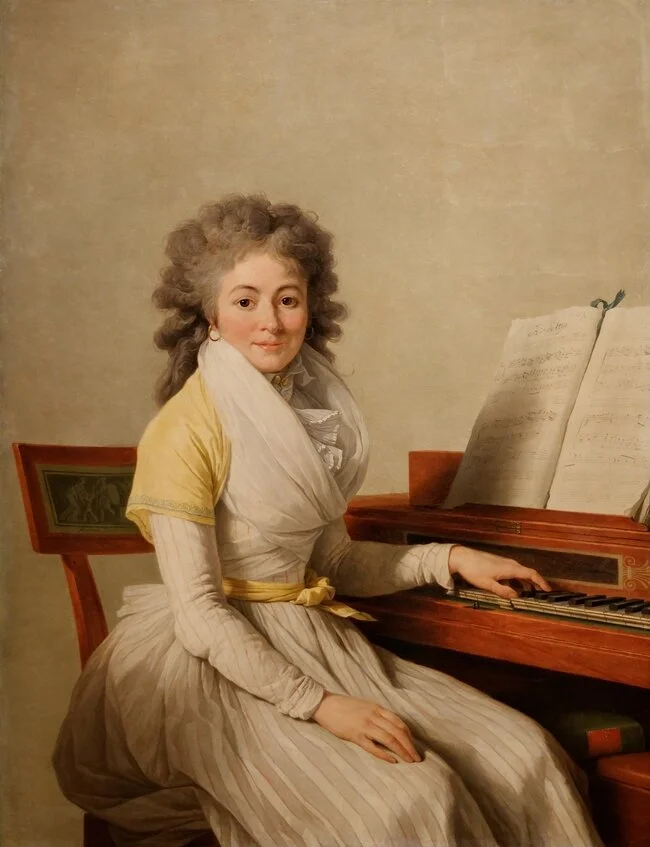
Portrait of a Lady

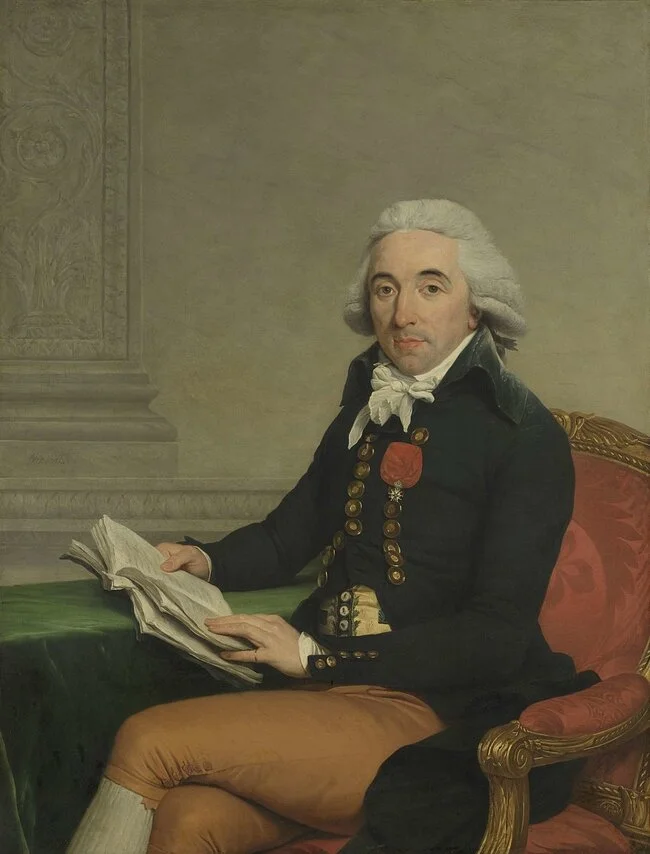
Portrait of a Man

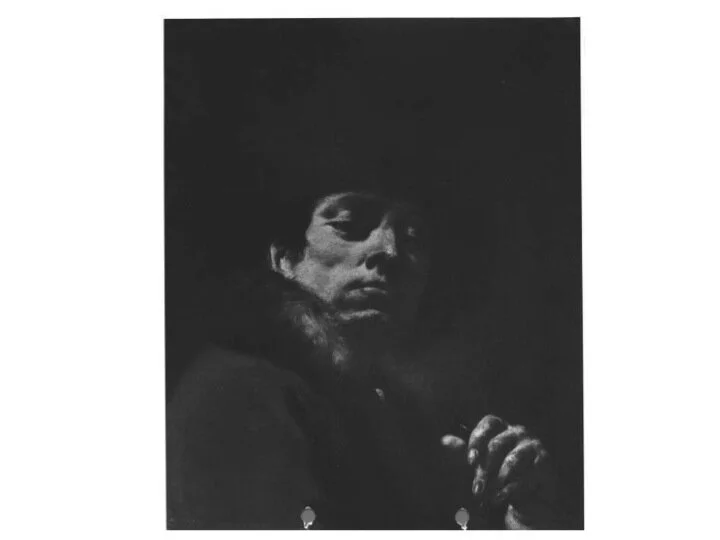
Portrait of a Man Piazzetta

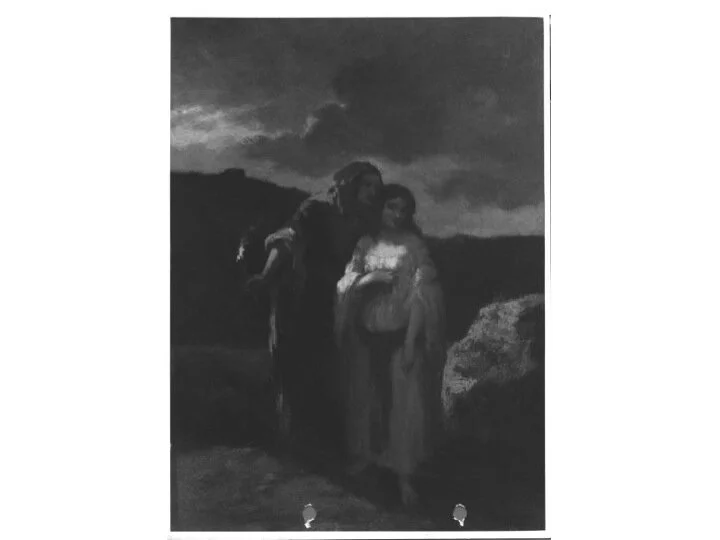
The Sorceress

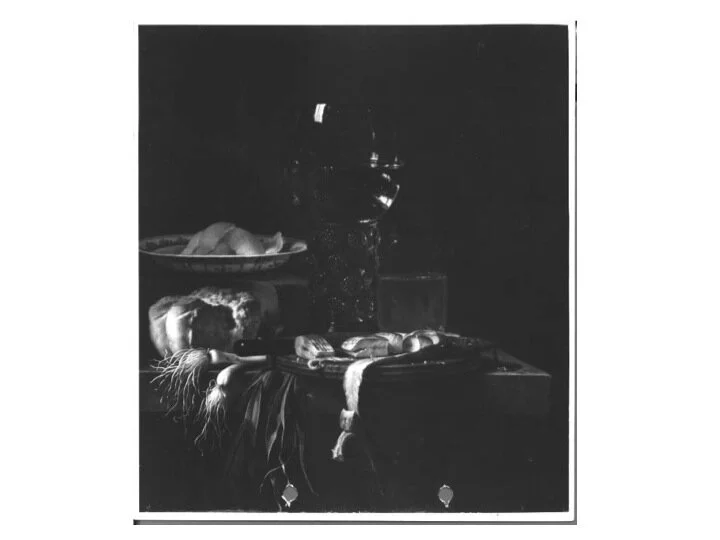
Still Life With Fish

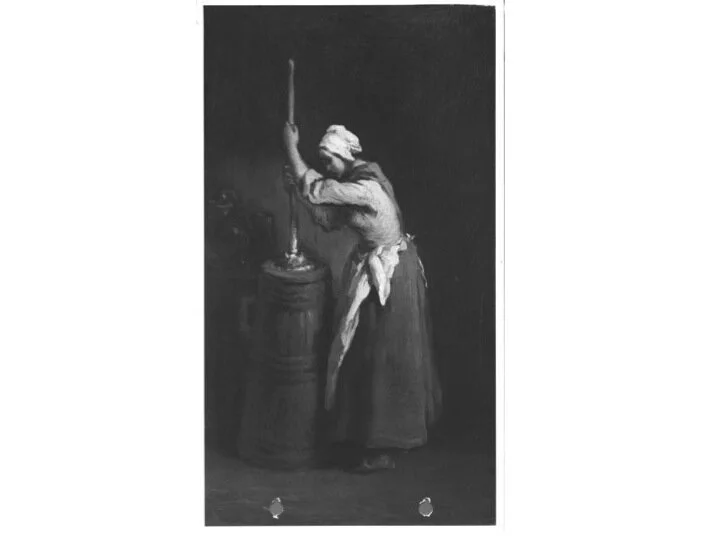
La barrateuse

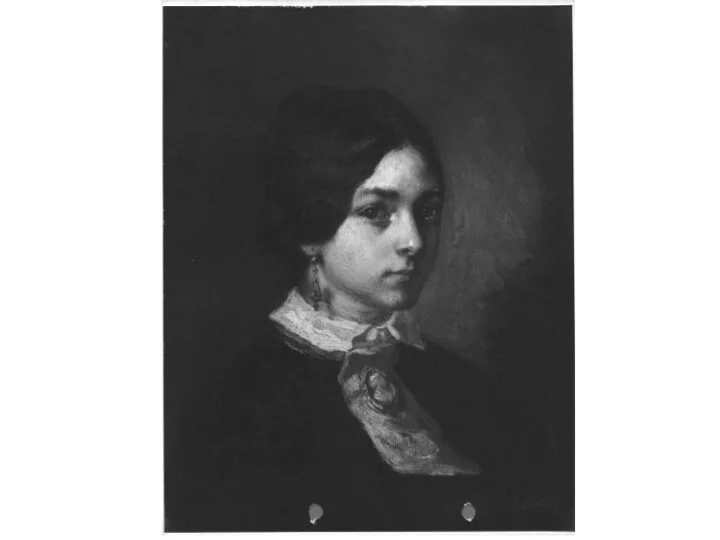
Portrait de Madam Millet

While the 39 pieces of jewellery and figurines seem to have been chosen because they could be easily carried, the paintings stolen seem to have been a matter of choice. Most were small works, around 32 centimetres (12.5 in) along their longest dimension. The three smallest (the Brueghels and Millet's La barrateuse) were less than 520 square centimetres (80 sq in), smaller than a standard letter-size piece of paper. Their small size, in addition to making them easy to carry and conceal, would also facilitate quick sales. The robbers, and any dealer working with them, might, investigators have speculated, have been looking to sell to private collectors who display their paintings in their homes. The pairs of small paintings with similar subject matter by the same artist—Brueghel, Corot, Millet and Vincent—would be excellent choices to decorate a room.

The largest was the Courbet, at 29 by 36 inches (74 by 91 cm), followed by the Gainsborough and Corot's Dreamer. As the thieves escaped on foot, it is possible that they each carried a batch of smaller paintings in one hand and a larger one in the other.

The robbers might not even have had to visit the museum to decide what works to take. Half of those they kept had been in Masterpieces from Montreal, a travelling exhibition that had been to several cities in the U.S. during the year before Expo 67. The Rembrandt had been included in a 1969 exhibit commemorating the tricentennial of the artist's death, and the following year many of the French paintings had been in another exhibit that the press in that language gave great attention to. All works in the special exhibitions would have been depicted in associated handbooks or catalogues. Only the Brueghels, the Rubens and the Vincent portraits had not been included in those exhibits nor mentioned in any publication save the museum's own catalogue.

Interest in art in recent years had driven up prices, a phenomenon which had been widely reported in both French- and English-language media, and the thieves would have known even if they had no interest in art what collectors were willing to pay large sums for. Some art dealers in the Montreal area refused to discuss their business with police.

Among the stolen jewellery pieces were an 18th-century gold watch once owned by the wife of Jacques Viger, Montreal's first mayor; a 19th-century French blue enamel latch box set with diamonds and two 17th-century Spanish pendants.

The value of the stolen work was estimated at around US$2 million, one-quarter of the insured value of the museum's entire collection at that time. Adjusting for inflation alone, this would be $11.7 million in 2025. However, in the intervening years fine art had appreciated in value ahead of inflation: by 1992 the insurance companies had valued the paintings at $12 million ($69.9 million in 2025)

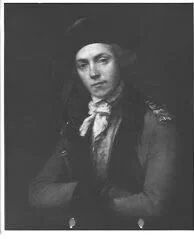
Portrait of Sir Thomas Fletcher

The attribution of some of the stolen work has been questioned. When the de Heems were being prepared for their inclusion in Masterpieces from Montreal, a Parisian art historian suggested that they were the work of another Dutch master, Evert Collier. The Rembrandt landscape depicts a location that both he and his students frequently returned to as a subject. Some historians are not entirely confident the painting was his even though it bears his signature. The Gainsborough portrait may be the work of Gainsborough's rival Joshua Reynolds. (Note: Its subject, Thomas Fletcher, is shown wearing a Madras regimental uniform, which he only started wearing in 1771, three years before Reynolds painted his own portrait of Fletcher. The general left England the year after that, and died in 1776.)

== Investigation ==
From interviews with the three guards, police learned that there had been three thieves. The guards saw two of them, describing them as both about 168 centimetres (5 ft 6 in) in height. One spoke French and the other English. The guards also reported the Francophone they heard but did not see.

Investigators were immediately struck by the similarity to another recent art theft in the Montreal area. On August 30, three thieves had broken into the summer home of Agnes Meldrum, wife of a Montreal moving-company owner, in Oka, roughly 32 kilometres (20 miles) west of the city. They had all climbed up a 180-metre (600 ft) cliff from a powerboat on Lake of Two Mountains to do so. While they wore hoods to prevent identification, two spoke French and the other, English. Once inside the home they stole paintings worth $50,000 in total. However, the Sûreté du Québec (SQ), the provincial police force, soon excluded any possibility the two thefts were related.

=== Inside-job theory ===
The presence of two Francophones and one Anglophone, plus the climbing skills involved, led the chief investigator on the case to believe the thieves involved in both incidents had been local, and possibly the same. That, and their apparent knowledge of the skylight's non-functional alarm, fostered a theory that someone at the museum had aided the thieves. This is common when museums are robbed, two New York City detectives who specialized in art crime said when commenting about the Montreal case later in 1972. In 2017, art-crimes investigator Anthony Amore said that 90% of all art thefts are inside jobs. He believes strongly that this is the case with the Montreal robbery, although the poorly planned escape suggests the thieves were amateurs.

However, the SPVM considered that speculation too broad to be helpful in focusing their investigation, and evidence did not bear it out. While it was possible that the thieves had actively involved someone working on the skylight, it was as possible that they had learned of the security flaw without inside knowledge. An intense investigation of the workers involved with the skylight found no evidence they had passed information about it to anyone criminally inclined.

It was also possible that the robbers had learned of the skylight flaw through simple reconnaissance. Roughly two weeks before the theft, someone reported encountering two men sitting on chairs on the roof, wearing sunglasses and smoking. When questioned by the person who reported the incident, they claimed to be museum employees. The chairs on the roof were not found after the theft. Likewise, no fingerprints or other evidence was left on either the ladder or nylon rope. Inside-job theories were also undermined by the thieves' poorly planned exit. If they had based their panel-truck alternative on inside information, they would have known how to disable the alarm they set off on the side entrance. Even if they had not, they would have known it did not sound anywhere else besides the museum—and thus not have abandoned half of their take to escape on foot.

=== Possible early suspects ===
Early in their investigation, the police began looking into a group of students at the nearby École des beaux-arts de Montréal. Mostly Francophone, they had often visited the museum but had frequently been asked to leave before closing so that the mostly Anglophone staff could take their tea, which the students resented.

Police kept five of these students under 24-hour surveillance for two weeks but found no evidence linking them to the case. Alain Lacoursière (an SPVM art-theft specialist who investigated the cold case in later years) believes the students were not involved. "This crime was organized with a guy in charge who was 35 to 40 years old," well past his student years, he said in 2010.

== Ransom negotiations and recovery attempts ==
In many art thefts the thieves seek ransom payments in return for the stolen works, which happened twice in the MMFA thefts. (Note: The ransom attempts and negotiations were not publicly disclosed until 10 years after the robbery.) Within a week of the robbery the museum's security director received a phone call from, he believed, one of the thieves. A man with a nasal voice and an accent Carter described as "European" gave him directions to a phone booth near McGill University. The security director went to the location, where another call told him to pick up a discarded cigarette pack on the ground, which contained one of the museum's stolen pendant.

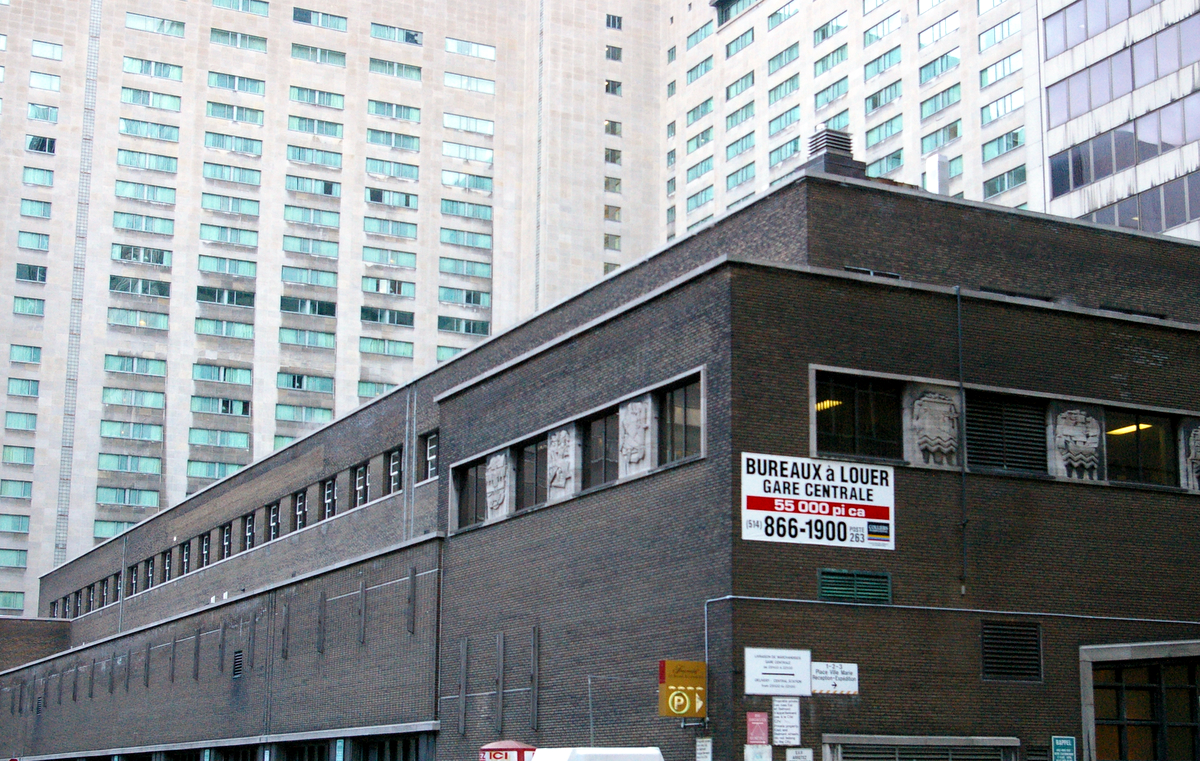
One of the stolen paintings was found in Montreal Central Station, pictured in 2008

Soon afterwards, a brown manila Port of Montreal envelope arrived at the museum with snapshots of the stolen paintings. Carter nicknamed the thief "Port of Montreal" as a result, and ransom negotiations began. At first the thieves demanded $500,000, about a quarter of the works' publicly stated value; (Note: The initial police report had valued the stolen works at closer to $5 million with the Rembrandt accounting for $1.75 million) later they halved that. Carter demanded the thieves, or whoever was negotiating on their behalf, give more proof they had the paintings than snapshots. In response, they told the museum's security director to go to a locker in Montreal Central Station. Inside, he found the Brueghel Landscape with Buildings and Wagon, the only one of the stolen paintings yet recovered.

As a result of these negotiations, approximately a month later the SPVM set up a sting operation. An undercover detective posed as a middleman and agreed to meet the thieves or their representative in an empty field in Longueuil, where he hoped the thieves would believe he was ready to hand over $5,000 for another painting. However, when a local police cruiser passed by, unaware of the plans, the thieves apparently realized what was happening and never met the undercover officer. The next day they called Carter and complained that they had been set up.

Lacoursière believes that it was actually the museum and police being set up. The field had few nearby houses at the time and could easily have been monitored from some distance away, allowing the robbers to detect even the more subtle police presence necessary to support a sting. "It was all a smokescreen", he says. Since the thieves never reopened negotiations afterwards, he believes they never had any intention of returning the paintings at the time and were using the negotiations as a diversion to buy more time to sell or otherwise dispose of the paintings. Amore notes that it is much easier to fence stolen jewelry (Note: If jewelry is too identifiable, it can be rendered into component gemstones and precious metals which are less traceable.) and the thieves were probably able to do that in order to profit from the crime within weeks.

The second attempt took place the following year. A few months after the museum closed for its three-year renovation project in May 1973, a caller to a member of the museum's board said he would share where the paintings were hidden for $10,000. André DeQuoy, an adjustor involved in the discussion, made it clear that while the insurance companies would pay for information leading to the discovery of the paintings, they would not pay for the paintings themselves. After he agreed to deliver it personally to the source, the board made the money available. The caller instructed DeQuoy, discreetly followed by police, to go to a phone booth in downtown Montreal one afternoon. From there the caller sent him to other phone booths elsewhere in the city, such as the Blue Bonnets race track, on St. Laurent Boulevard and at the Henri-Bourassa station on the Montreal Metro. The caller then informed DeQuoy that he had picked up the police tail and DeQuoy was to return to his office and await further instructions while the caller had the unmarked car called off.

DeQuoy did, and an hour later the caller said the police had been taken care of. Again he was sent back and forth across the island of Montreal to 11 phone booths, until at 4 a.m. he was told he could leave the envelope with the money at the base of a sign in a vacant lot on St. Martin Boulevard, then return to the Henri-Bourassa phone booth where the caller would contact him again with the location of the paintings. After leaving the money, DeQuoy returned and waited for the call, he let the police know where he had been all night. But the caller never called, so the adjustor returned to his office. At 8 a.m. the caller called him there and told him the paintings were in a motel in Laval, north of Montreal. An intensive search of the building, however, produced neither the paintings nor any sign they had ever been there.

== News coverage and effect on case ==
=== Labour Day weekend 1972 in Montreal ===
In Montreal, Labour Day weekend of 1972 began with two major news events, neither of them well received. On the night of Friday, September 1, four intoxicated men who had been refused entry to a downtown country-and-western bar retaliated by setting the club's steps afire; the ensuing blaze killed 37, the worst act of mass murder in the city's history. On the following evening, the Soviet national hockey team defeated a team of Canadian National Hockey League stars 7–3 in the first game of the Summit Series at the Montreal Forum. Canadians consider hockey integral to their national identity, a sentiment particularly strong in Montreal, where some of the earliest hockey games were played. They had expected their team to overwhelmingly defeat the less-storied Soviets. Fans in Montreal were eagerly looking ahead to the next game in the series, to be held Monday evening in Toronto.

At the museum, the board president, director, and director of security were all on vacation in either the United States or Mexico for the holiday weekend. Bantey, the public relations director, was the most senior official in charge.

=== Museum news conference ===
Later the morning after the theft, Bantey, who had covered the crime beat in Montreal as a journalist prior to his tenure at the museum, held a news conference. He identified all the stolen works and described how the robbers had entered the museum and taken them. "They did show quite discriminating taste," he told reporters, "though as far as the objects are concerned, they could do with more art and historical training". In their haste to leave, he noted, the thieves had left behind another Rembrandt. It has also been noted that there were works by El Greco, Picasso and Tintoretto they could as easily have taken. Jackson believed that the works left behind showed that the thieves had planned "a general clear-out of the museum".

The news conference was initially effective in publicizing the theft. It, as well as lists of the stolen paintings, were reported as front-page news in many major newspapers across the U.S. and Canada the next morning. As soon as they learned of the theft, the SPVM had also put out the alert to the crossings along the U.S. border, about 60 kilometres (37 mi) from Montreal, to look out for the thieves and/or the paintings.

=== Subsequent news coverage ===
However, further publicity that might have drawn attention to the theft and perhaps helped solve it was stymied by news events of September 5. At that year's Summer Olympics in Munich, Palestinian terrorists took 11 Israeli athletes hostage, eventually killing them. As a result further news about the art theft got less priority in the media. The investigation continued despite the lack of media attention. CTV News reporter Bob Benedetti, who did one of his standups while on the ladder left outside the museum, told W5 a half-century later that he believes the thieves were local to Montreal and benefited from the subdued coverage due to the other events dominating the news.

Around Christmas, a Montreal Gazette columnist reported that, in fact, most of the paintings had been delivered to the homes of wealthy collectors in Mount Royal, with a small portion diverted to the U.S. This led police to interrogate two unnamed individuals, but no new leads developed as a result. Due to the minimal news coverage, in January 1973 Bill Bantey put together a circular, Attention: Stolen, depicting the stolen paintings and giving information such as their dimensions, in English and French. The idea was to distribute it widely throughout the international art community and familiarize possible buyers with the stolen works, a practice not common in art thefts at the time as most museums did not publicize thefts. Major auction houses like Sotheby's and Christie's would not routinely check for whether art offered for sale through them was on lists of stolen works until 1985. "[We hope that] the items become so catalogued and so well-known that it would be unlikely that any collector or museum buyer could innocently purchase them," Bantey told the Gazette.

The museum and investigators did not make the ransom negotiations in the year after the thefts public knowledge until ten years later. "For years we thought our chances of recovery were better keeping everything quiet," said one police officer, explaining the decision. "But now our hopes are small." The efforts at ransom negotiations were revealed by the museum and investigators in 1982, when hopes of recovery had diminished. The officer explained that the news release might "stimulate interest and produce something." Some information was confirmed, but this did not provide any new leads. Beneditti said at the time of the theft, the reporters covering it saw themselves as assisting the police. "There was a certain trust and camaraderie that we were doing the same kind of job. We were trying to find out who did what and they were trying to find out who did what."

== Criticism of investigation ==
Lacoursière took an interest in the case in 1984, by his account taking it over just before the files were to be shredded. (Note: Another account states that Lacoursière did not begin reviewing the case until 1993.) His work on the case was strictly his own initiative; he was told by his supervisors not to waste time on it. The original investigation was perfunctory, closed after a year by the two detectives assigned to it, with no significant findings, Lacoursiere says.

Key files were mishandled, according to Lacoursière. Two statements were lost. He also faults the lack of followup. When he asked if it was possible to reinterview the security guards, he was told that two were dead and one was suffering from Alzheimer's disease. The records themselves had been transferred to microfilm, and by the late 2010s, with no one at the SPVM actively investigating the case (to his knowledge), he believed the film was in danger of deteriorating. According to Amore, the SQ's art crime unit was disbanded in the 21st century and its personnel redeployed.

Beneditti, the TV reporter who covered the story, agrees that the investigation suffered since art thefts did not occur much. "There weren't professional art thieves roaming around", he recalls. "[P]eople didn't rob museums. They robbed banks. We were the bank robbery capital of Canada."

== Later developments ==
The recovered Brueghel was kept in storage at the museum by Ruth Jackson for 10 years until a new frame could be purchased, after which it was returned to public display. However, it was later determined that it was not by Brueghel but a student of his; Lacoursière believes the thieves may have chosen to return it due to doubts about its authenticity. It nevertheless remains on exhibit as of 2022. (Note: Scholars have come to believe that the two stolen de Heem works are also misattributed, and some doubts have been expressed about the Rembrandt.)

After a group of 20 insurers paid out nearly $2 million, they posted a $50,000 reward for the return of the paintings, which under the terms of the policies they now legally owned. The museum used the money to purchase a Rubens, The Leopards. But like the Brueghel, it was later reattributed to the painter's assistants, after a conservationist determined in the 1990s that its red pigments had been mixed four decades after Rubens' death. On the 35th anniversary of the robbery, in 2007, the museum thus returned it to storage, where it has remained.

In 1992, reflecting the revised estimate of the missing works' worth, the insurers increased the reward offer to $100,000. On behalf of the SPVM, Lacoursière, who began investigating art crime in 1994, offered an additional million in 1999. Both remain unclaimed.

Some promising leads over the years have yielded nothing. Lacoursière, now retired, has been told that the paintings, or some of them, are in Italy, and that two Montreal men in the French city of Nice were possible suspects. One drug dealer he interviewed in Vancouver seemed to have inside information about the robbery, but everything he told Lacoursière had been previously reported. He could not give two details police have withheld.

=== "Smith" ===
Lacoursière considers one lead valid. At a 1998 vernissage, a dealer he had gotten to know introduced him to a man who has been identified as "Smith". The man impressed Lacoursière as an art aficionado, familiar with every major painter and particularly knowledgeable about the history of art in Quebec. He collected classic cars, with a fondness for Bugattis, and memorabilia associated with them.

Smith told the detective he, too, had been a student at the École des beaux-arts at the time of the theft, explaining to him the tension between the students and museum staff. In the course of their initial conversation Smith said he had not been one of the five students kept under surveillance afterward. But he knew a great deal about the robbery, perhaps more than the police. And Lacoursière was not certain that all the things Smith knew had been made public at the time, if ever.

For example, Lacoursière attempted to allay his suspicions by falsely describing the rope lowered from the skylight as made of steel, but Smith quickly corrected him that it was nylon. He also told the detective that the rope used by the thieves to enter from the skylight was not grey as had been reported at the time, but yellow like the ones used at the school building. Upon reviewing the original file and talking with one of the original investigators, Lacoursière found that information on the colour of the rope had been withheld to confirm any later confessions or statements by possible suspects. He considered Smith's statements "highly suspicious".

Lacoursière visited Smith at his home near Saint-Jean-sur-Richelieu 40 km (25 mi) south of Montreal. He found that a year after Smith finished his five-year course at the school, he had spent CDN$250,000 (CDN$1.74 million in 2025) to buy himself a house and a local woodworking company. Lacoursière could not determine how Smith might have acquired that amount of money at such a young age (Smith told him his family was wealthy). Lacoursière implied in 2010 it might have been from selling the stolen work.

According to Lacoursière, Smith told him that he would at some point in the future tell him something about the robbery. In 2007, during the filming of "Le Columbo de l'art" ("The Colombo of Art"), a Radio-Canada special on his career as an art-theft detective, Lacoursière visited Smith and offered him the million-dollar cheque on camera. Smith, however, simply laughed, and invited the camera crew into his house so they could see for themselves that he had none of the stolen paintings.

In 2010, Quebec journalist Sylvain Larocque interviewed Smith by telephone. While Smith again denied any role in the theft himself, he claimed that "employees ... possibly professors and porters" at the Université du Québec à Montréal, which the École des beaux-arts had merged with in 1969, were behind the robbery. They were possibly, he claimed, the same people behind an earlier robbery at the university.

The following year Smith emailed Lacoursière a link to a video. It was an advertisement in which a long-lost masterpiece was found in a bank deposit box connected to the mafia.

Smith died in the late 2010s, never having told Lacoursière anything about the robbery. The detective believes that while Smith neither masterminded the robbery nor had the paintings in his possession, he was possibly one of the robbers.

== Theories of the paintings' current whereabouts ==
The robbery receives little attention today, except from the insurance companies and police, who continue to search. "Like a death in the family, you have to let it drop," Bantey says. However, in 2009, Paul Lavallée, the museum's director at the time, said it continues to affect the museum, since it might not be able to reclaim the works even if they were recovered. "[W]e would be strapped for funds," he said, even if the insurer offered them to the museum at a discount.

It is possible the paintings may have been destroyed to prevent them from being used as evidence against those in possession of them. But Lacoursière believes they were likely sold through smaller dealers, who may not have known or cared if they were stolen, to collectors who likewise keep them private, especially today, since they cannot sell them. He also notes that criminal organizations have found stolen art useful in other ways, such as money laundering. In 2000, he recalls, police found art stolen from homes in the affluent suburbs of Westmount and Outremont in the Laval home of Joseph Ghaleb, a loanshark linked to both the Montreal-area Hells Angels and the local mafia. He had served as a fence for art thieves, selling the stolen art at 10% of its price to the Italian Mafia, who in turn used the names of dead Westmount residents on faked provenance forms.

While it is not believed likely that the original robbers were affiliated with organized crime, the ransom attempts may point in that direction. The Port of Montreal envelope in which the snapshots of the stolen art was sent may suggest the involvement of the West End Gang, an Irish-dominated group historically based in the city's port. Bantey, however, doubts this based on his familiarity with the city's criminal element from his journalism days. The West End Gang and the Italian mafia were interested in prostitution and/or drugs exclusively at the time, he says, and no one involved with them then would have had the expertise required to pull off the robbery. Nor does he believe the thieves were motivated by separatism or any other political cause, just a desire to enrich themselves.

There are some suggestions the paintings, if they still exist, are still in Montreal, or elsewhere in Canada, or the U.S. or Europe. But investigators believe if the mafia has been involved, the art has been moved to Latin America. Lacoursière notes that many of the West End Gang often spend their winters in, and retire to, Costa Rica. Police there have not responded to requests for assistance from their counterparts in Montreal. Bantey believes the paintings are in South America somewhere. "I've heard several people I respect say that." The police files on the robbery remain closed to public inspection as the case is still open.

== See also ==
- 1972 in art
- 1972 in Canada
- Crime in Canada
- List of stolen paintings
- Timeline of Montreal history
- 2011 Montreal Museum of Fine Arts theft, the only subsequent theft in the museum's history, from which one of two stolen pieces have been recovered; took place on September 3, one day before 39th anniversary of 1972 robbery
- John Tillmann, Canadian art thief considered the most successful of all time
- Isabella Stewart Gardner Museum theft, 1990 robbery of 13 pieces worth $500 million from a Boston museum that was until 2019 the largest art theft and largest theft of private property in history; also unsolved.
- 2019 Dresden heist, theft of jewelry and related items valued at nearly €1 billion, making it the largest such theft in history

== Works cited ==
- Sezgin, Catherine Schofield (Fall 2010). "The Skylight Caper: The Unsolved 1972 Theft of the Montreal Museum of Fine Arts" (PDF). The Journal of Art Crime (4). Association for Research into Crimes against Art (ARCA): 57–68. ISSN 1947-5934.
