= Still Life with Candlestick =

1922 painting by Fernand Léger

- Nature morte aux chandeliers (French)
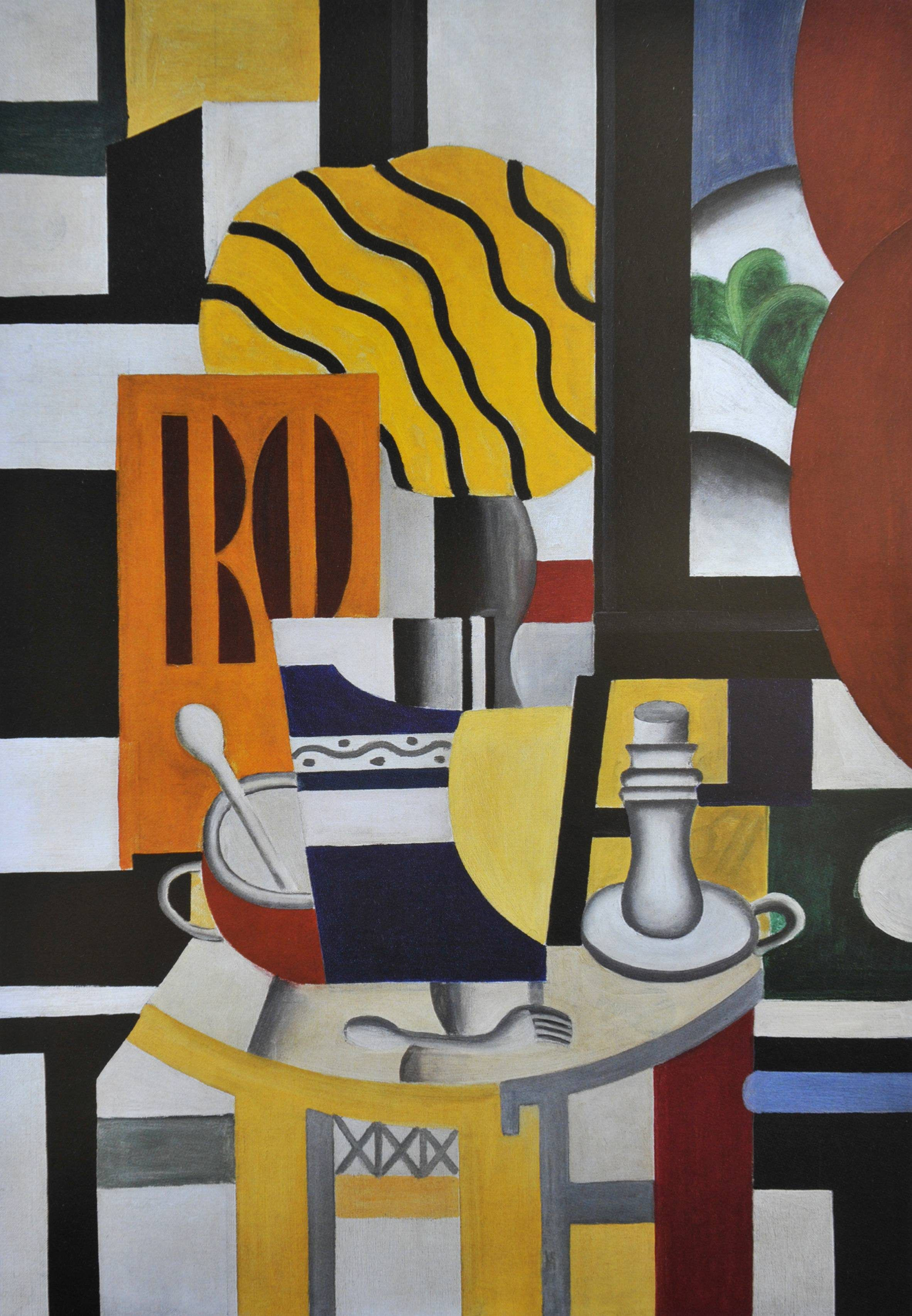
- Artist: Fernand Léger
- Year: 1922
- Medium: Oil on canvas
- Dimensions: 116 cm × 80 cm (45.6 in × 31.5 in)
- Location: Musée d'Art Moderne de Paris (stolen in 2010); Paris

Still Life with Candlestick (French: Nature morte aux chandeliers, Nature morte, chandeliers, Nature morte au chandelier, Le chandelier) is an oil on canvas painting created in 1922 by the French artist Fernand Léger.

This painting was stolen on 20 May 2010 from the Musée d'Art Moderne de la Ville de Paris. The museum reported the overnight theft of five paintings from its collection, valued at €100 million ($123 million USD), though this figure may be conservative.

The principal suspect, Vjeran Tomic (nicknamed "Spider-Man" for his ability to scale buildings), was commissioned by antiques dealer Jean-Michel Corvez to steal this painting by Léger. In the process, he stole paintings by Picasso, Matisse, Modigliani, and Braque.

The paintings taken, in addition to Still Life with Chandeliers, were Le pigeon aux petits pois (Dove with Green Peas, or Pigeon with Peas, 1911) by Pablo Picasso, La Pastorale (1906) by Henri Matisse, L'Olivier Près de l'Estaque (Olive Tree near L'Estaque, 1906) by Georges Braque, La Femme à l'Éventail (Woman with a Fan, 1919) by Amedeo Modigliani. A window had been smashed and CCTV footage showed a masked man taking the paintings. Authorities believed the thief acted alone. The man carefully removed the paintings from their frames, which he left behind.

The theft, executed with an extreme level of sophistication, was investigated by the Brigade de Répression du Banditisme specialist unit of the French Police. It is unclear why the alarm systems in the museum failed to detect the robbery. Staff only discovered the paintings were missing when they arrived at the museum just before 7:00 am. The museum closed on 20 May 2010, citing "technical reasons". The theft follows the $162 million heist of masterpieces by Cézanne, Degas, Van Gogh and Monet from Foundation E.G. Bührle in Zürich in February 2008 and could be one of the biggest art thefts in history (by value). It has been described as the "heist of the century". The French auctioneer and president of the Association du Palais de Tokyo, Pierre Cornette de Saint-Cyr, commented, "These five paintings are unsellable, so thieves, sirs, you are imbeciles. Now return them."

The thief and his sponsor were found one year after the heist, and the latter declared that he was seized by panic after a police raid and a phone call by the police. For fear that investigators were closing in, accomplices apparently destroyed the paintings. "I threw them into the trash," cried Yonathan Birn, one of three people on trial in the case, "I made the worst mistake of my existence." However, neither the judge or other defendants believed Birn was telling the truth. Authorities believe all of the paintings were removed from France. Birn's co-defendants testified he was "too smart" to destroy €100 million worth of artwork.

Pablo Picasso, 1911, Le pigeon aux petits pois (Pigeon with Peas), oil on canvas, 65 x 54 cm

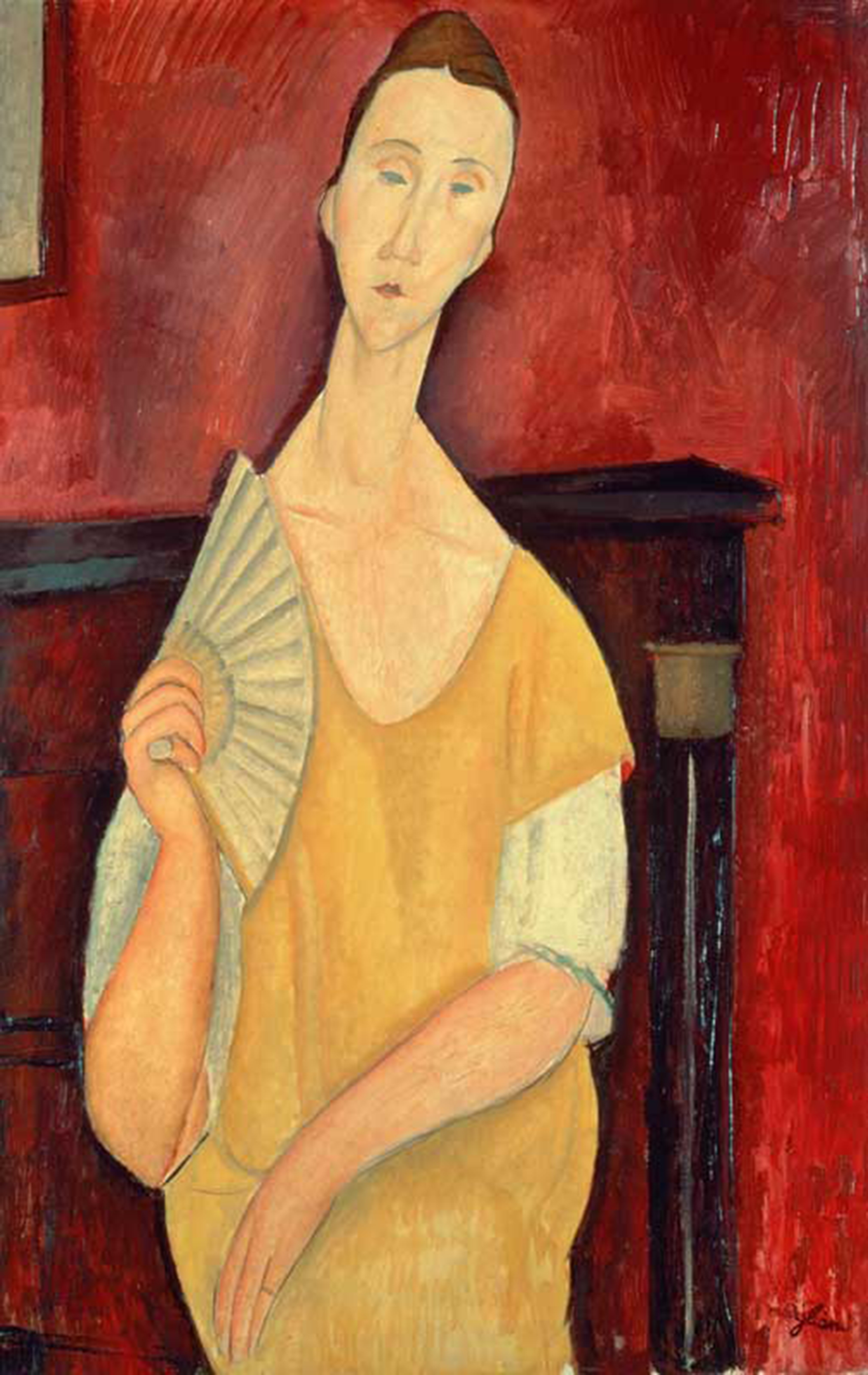
Amedeo Modigliani, 1919, Woman with a Fan (La Femme à l'Éventail), oil on canvas, 100 x 65 cm

== See also ==
- List of stolen paintings
