= Rupert Wace =

Charles Rupert Wace (born November 1955) is a British dealer in antiquities who trades as Rupert Wace Ancient Art. He is vice chairman of the Antiquities Dealers Association in the UK and a board member of the International Association of Dealers in Ancient Art.
