= Oratory of San Lorenzo =

Oratory in Palermo, Italy

Oratory of Saint Lawrence
- Oratorio di San Lorenzo (in Italian)
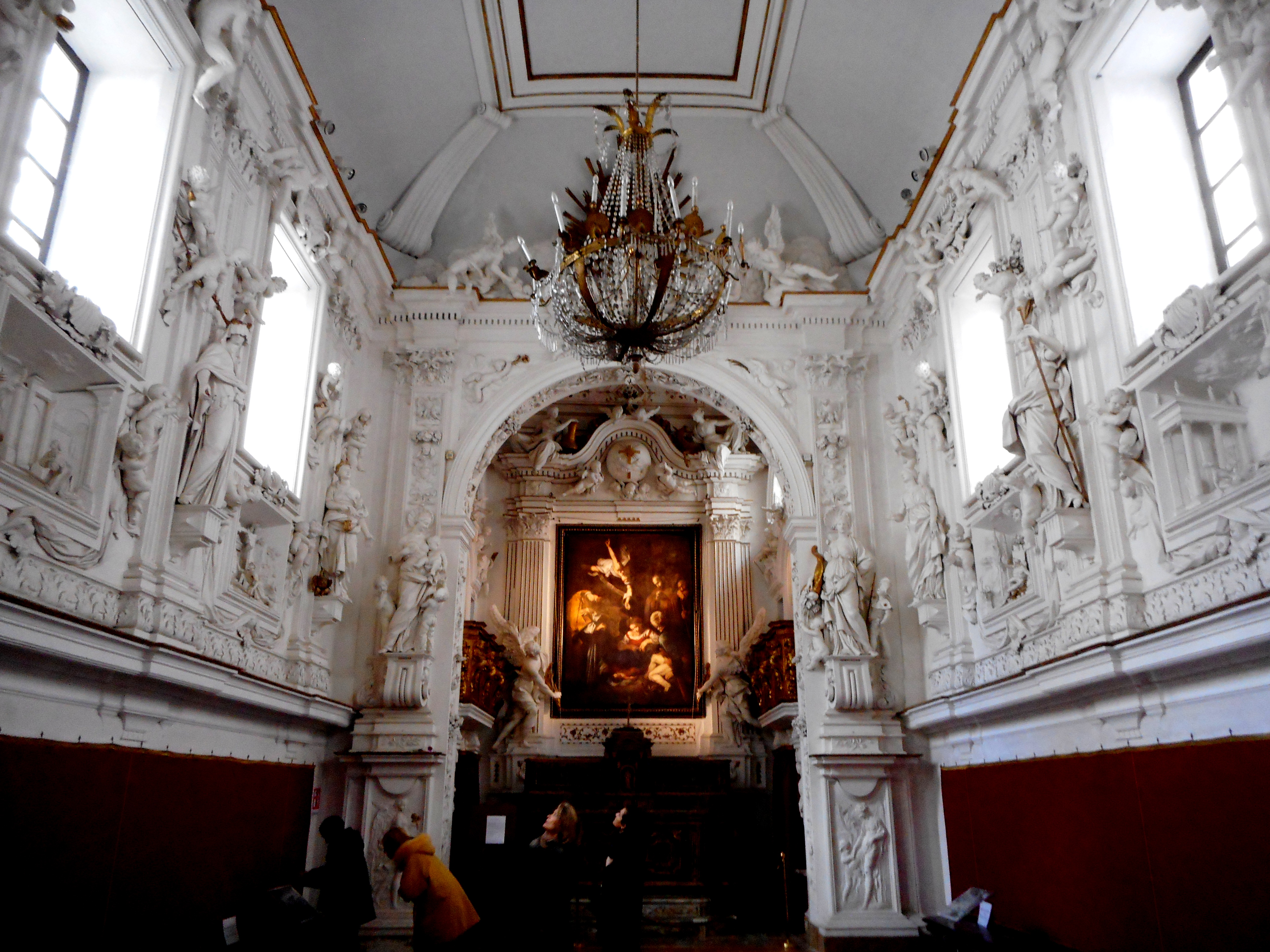

Religion
- Affiliation: Roman Catholic
- Province: Archdiocese of Palermo
- Rite: Roman Rite

Location
- Location: Palermo, Italy
- Interactive map of Oratory of Saint Lawrence
- Coordinates: 38°07′00.07″N 13°21′59.15″E

Architecture
- Style: Sicilian Baroque
- Groundbreaking: 1570 c.

The Oratory of Saint Lawrence (Italian: Oratorio di San Lorenzo) is a Baroque oratory of Palermo. It is located near the Basilica of Saint Francis of Assisi, in the quarter of the Kalsa, within the historic centre of Palermo.

The oratory was built in 1569 to replace a former smaller church dedicated to St Lawrence. Construction was funded by a confraternity of mainly Genovese merchants, and linked to Conventual Franciscans. In 1699–1706, Giacomo Serpotta realized a sumptuous stucco decoration, depicting the life of St Francis.

The oratory is particularly famous because of the masterpiece altarpiece Nativity with St. Francis and St. Lawrence (1600 or 1609) by Caravaggio. This important painting was stolen, probably by Cosa Nostra, on October 18, 1969. It has never been recovered. In 2015 a hi-tech replica of the altarpiece was placed inside the oratory.

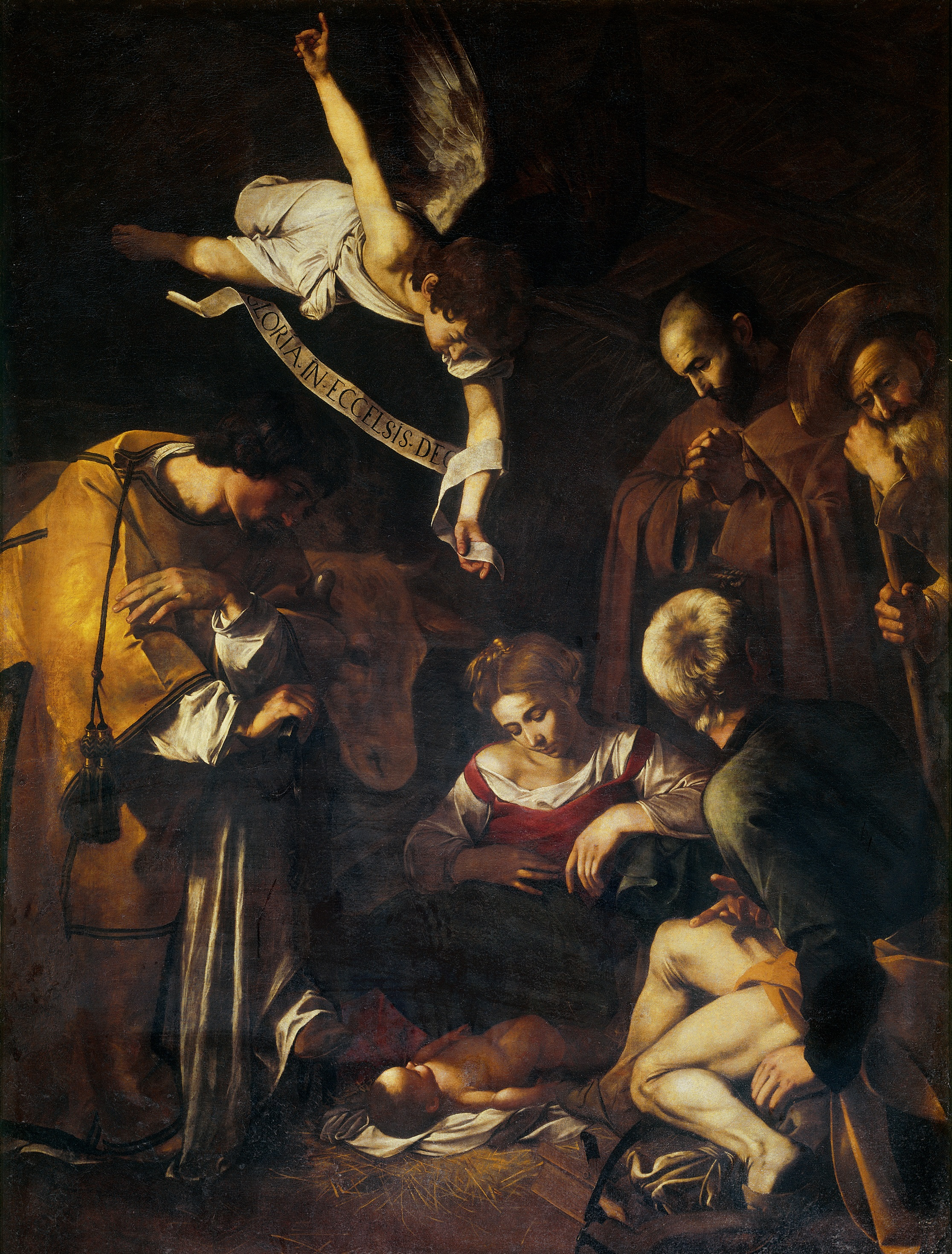
Caravaggio, Nativity with St. Francis and St. Lawrence
