= Le pigeon aux petits pois =

1911 painting by Pablo Picasso

- Pigeon with peas (English)
- Artist: Pablo Picasso
- Year: 1911
- Medium: Oil on canvas
- Movement: Cubism
- Dimensions: 65 cm × 54 cm (26 in × 21 in)
- Location: Missing after theft from Musée d'Art Moderne de la Ville de Paris in 2010; possibly destroyed

Le pigeon aux petit pois (English: Pigeon with peas), sometimes referred to as Dove with green peas, is a 1911 oil on canvas painting by Pablo Picasso. It is an example of Picasso's Cubist works and has an estimated value of €23 million. The painting was one of five artworks stolen from the Musée d'Art Moderne de la Ville de Paris on 20 May 2010, which together are valued at €100 million ($123 million). It has so far not been recovered and its whereabouts remain unknown.

== Background ==
This painting was created during the first period of Cubism, known as Analytical Cubism. It began in 1907, when Picasso showed his first Cubist painting titled Les Demoiselles d’Avignon to Georges Braque. The painting was influenced by African tribal art and broke the traditional rules of Western painting. Picasso and Braque spent two years working on the new Cubist style in collaboration. In 1908, Braque created his own Cubist painting titled Large Nude. A year later in 1909, Picasso and Braque changed their focus from depicting people to still life. By 1912 they had begun to introduce words into their paintings.

Analytical Cubism used geometric shapes to convey the forms of people and objects. Over time these geometric shapes became more prominent, creating a more abstract image. The subject was depicted in a fractured way and this presented a multi-dimensional viewpoint. The colour palette was intentionally limited to express this effect. Cubism offered the viewer a perspective in motion, as though viewing the subject from multiple angles at the same time.

== Description ==
Le pigeon aux petit pois is an oil on canvas painting, which was created by Picasso in 1911. It is painted in the style of Cubism and features tones of ochre and brown. The painting has an estimated value of €23 million.

== Theft ==
At 3:00 a.m. on 20 May 2010, a masked burglar broke into the Paris Museum of Modern Art by removing the glass from a window. Both the motion sensor and the alarm that should have been activated by the break-in were out of order. The theft was not discovered until the next morning. Police traced the perpetrator from an insider's tip and the burglar was identified as 49-year-old Vjéran Tomic, who had an existing criminal record. He was sentenced to eight years in prison and he and his two accomplices were ordered to pay a fine of €104 million.

One of Tomic's accomplices, Yonathan Birn, who confessed to receiving the stolen goods, claimed that he threw the stolen artworks in the trash, but the police doubt this assertion. In total, five artworks were stolen, including Le pigeon aux petit pois and works by Henri Matisse, Georges Braque, Fernand Léger and Amedeo Modigliani. The stolen paintings have never been found and together are valued at $100 million. The other four stolen paintings were Still Life with Chandeliers by Fernand Léger, Olive Tree near Estaque by Georges Braque, La Pastorale by Henri Matisse and Woman with a Fan by Amedeo Modigliani.

Alice Farren-Bradley, of the Art Loss Register in London, described the theft as "one of the biggest art heists ever, considering the estimated value, the prominence of the artists and the high profile of the museum."

== In popular culture ==
A copy of the painting is displayed in the 2015 James Bond movie Spectre, where it hangs on the wall in Oberhauser’s Moroccan lair.

The same painting also appears in the 2025 film The Accountant 2, where it can be seen hanging on the wall behind the main character, Christian Wolff, during a breakfast scene in the trailer released by Warner Bros. Pictures.

== See also ==
- List of famous stolen paintings
- Portrait of Ambroise Vollard (Picasso)
- Cubism
- List of Picasso artworks 1911–1920
- 1911 in art
