= Magnani-Rocca Foundation =

Italian art museum

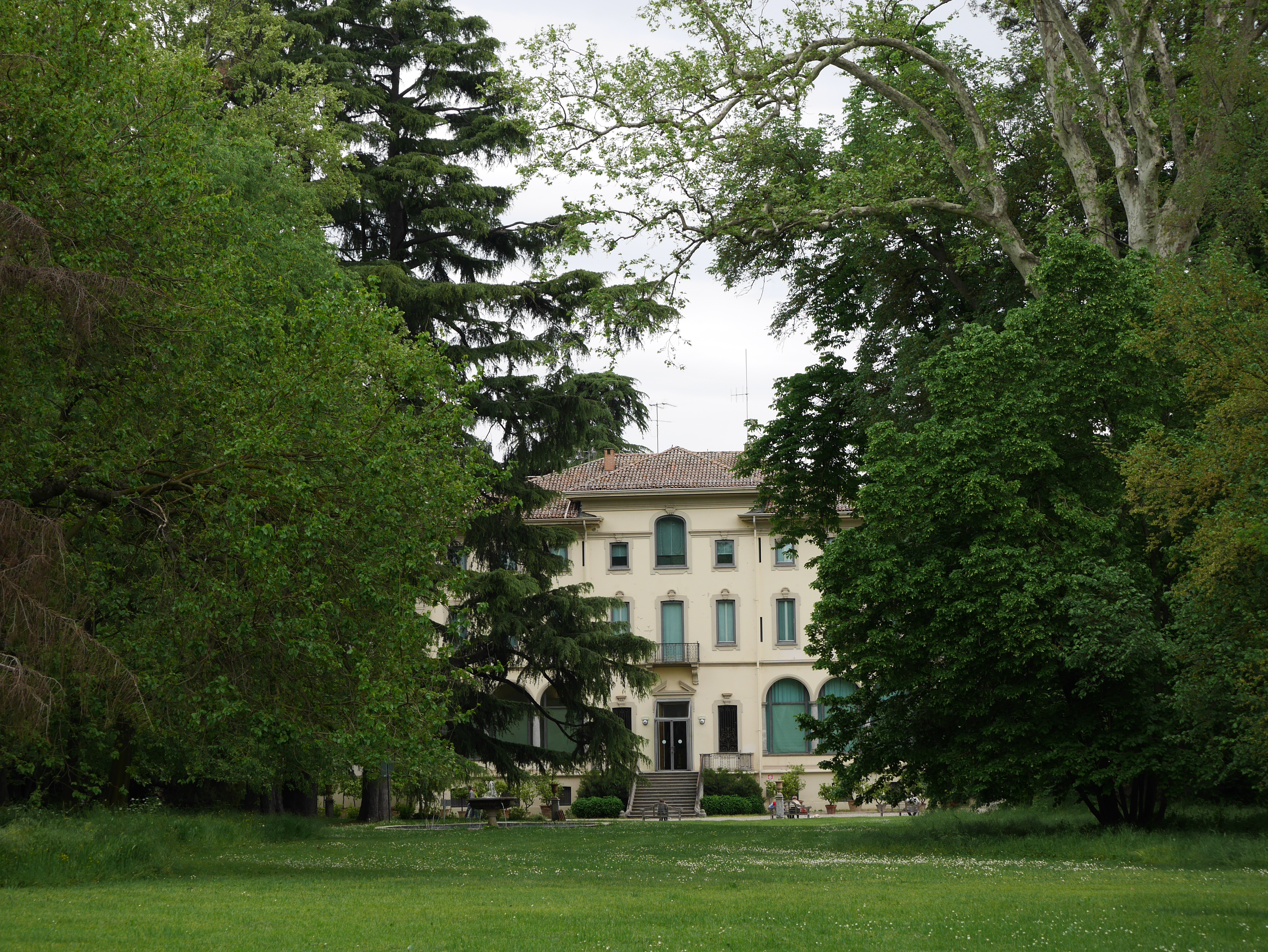
The Villa Magnani

The Magnani-Rocca Foundation (Italian: Fondazione Magnani-Rocca) is a private art foundation and museum established by Italian art collector Luigi Magnani in 1977 at Mamiano di Traversetolo, near Parma, Italy. The foundation promotes culture by exhibitions, and studies of European art, music and literature.

== History ==
The foundation was established by Luigi Magnani, an Italian art collector and critic in 1977. In 1978 the foundation received official recognition as a private cultural institution, as it encouraged interest in culture and took care of important European art collections.

The museum is located in Villa Magnani, also known as Villa dei Capolavori or "Villa of Masterpieces". In 1983 the place began displaying exhibitions and collections to the public. In 1990 the museum was officially open. The collections included works by Gentile da Fabriano, Albrecht Dürer, Vittore Carpaccio, Titian, Rubens, Van Dyck, Francisco Goya, Claude Monet, Auguste Renoir, Paul Cézanne, Giorgio Morandi (50 works), Giorgio de Chirico, Filippo de Pisis, Gino Severini, Alberto Burri, Johann Heinrich Füssli, Nicolas de Staël, Lippo di Dalmasio, Filippo Lippi, Domenico Ghirlandaio, Lorenzo Costa, Martin Schongauer as well as sculptures by Antonio Canova and Lorenzo Bartolini.

== 2026 art theft ==
On 22 March 2026 a robbery took place in which three paintings were stolen from the museum (Les poissons by Pierre-Auguste Renoir, Still with cherries and peaches by Paul Cézanne and Odalisque on the Terrace by Henri Matisse). According to the police four masked men executed the heist within three minutes. It is speculated that the museum's alarm prevented them from stealing more. The paintings were recovered by police in August.
