= Hercules (Piero della Francesca) =

Painting by Piero della Francesca

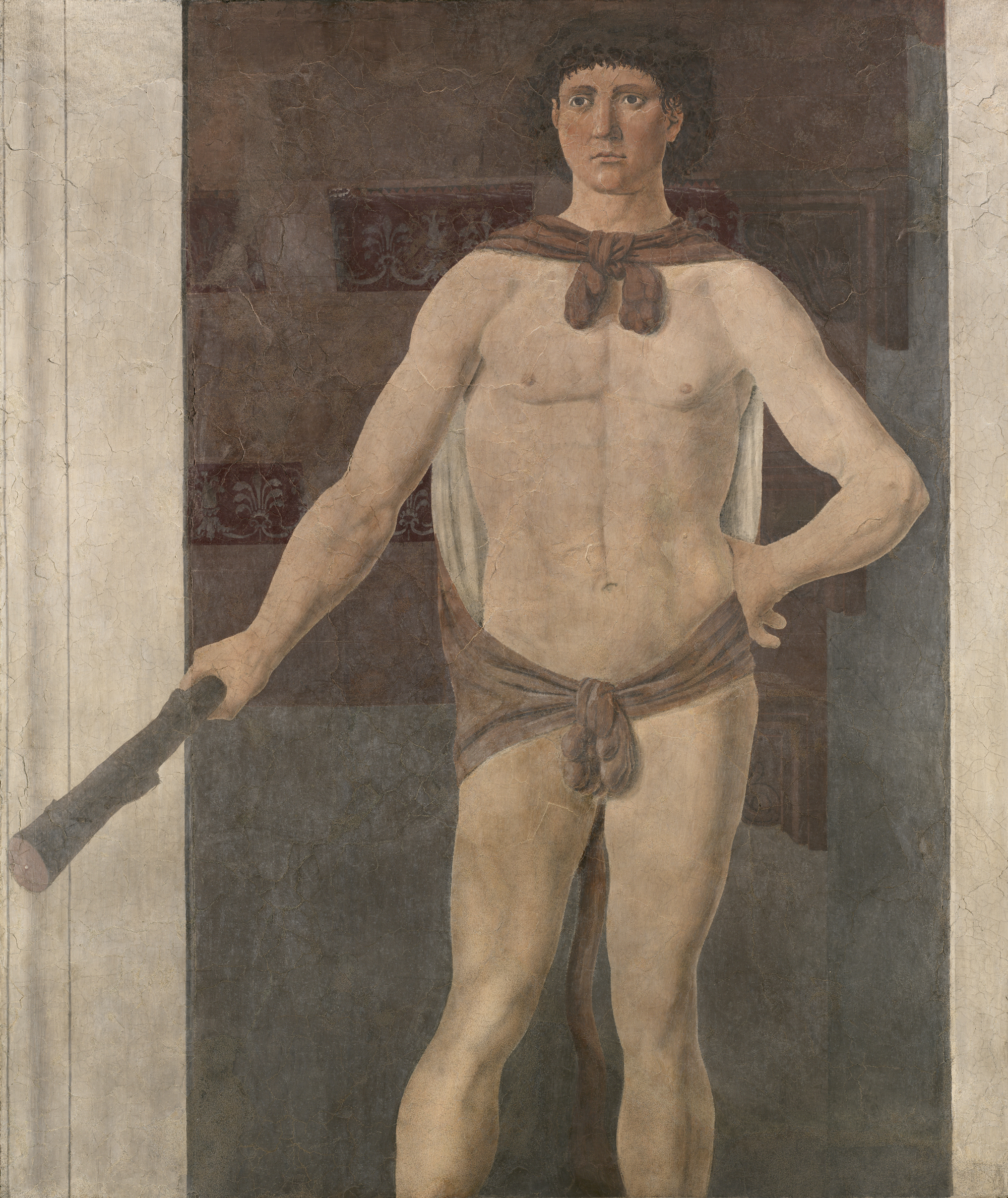
Hercules (c. 1465) by Piero della Francesca

Hercules is a fresco fragment by Piero della Francesca, his only known secular work and probably originally part of a cycle of mythological figures. It dates to sometime after 1465 and is now in the Isabella Stewart Gardner Museum in Boston, which acquired it from Joseph Lindon Smith, who in turn bought it from the Florentine art dealer Elia Volpi.

== History ==
It was rediscovered during the second half of the 18th century in a room of the artist's family home on via delle Aggiunte in Sansepolcro. Removing it from the wall and transporting it caused some further damage. It passed onto the art market, passing through the hands of Florentine art dealer Elia Volpi before being acquired in 1903 by Isabella Stewart Gardner via Joseph Lindon Smith in 1903.

It depicts Hercules as a nude with a lion-skin, standing in front of a basin, holding a club and with his left hand on his hip and his legs in an asymmetric contraposto pose. Typical in Piero's work, this solemn, static, languid, and realistic pose has an innate sense of balance. The serious and thoughtful face looks out from the frame, whilst the throat is modeled anatomically on classical sculptures and the friezes with palmettes in the background on classical motifs. The clear light almost cancels out the shadows, without diminishing the volume and three-dimensionality of the body. These stylistic elements place the work close to the artist's True Cross frescoes in Arezzo, particularly that work's Death of Adam scene which includes a boy leaning on a club in a similar pose to that of Hercules.
