= Montebello Mosaics =

Mosaics from same villa at the MET and Isabella Stewart Gardner Courtyard

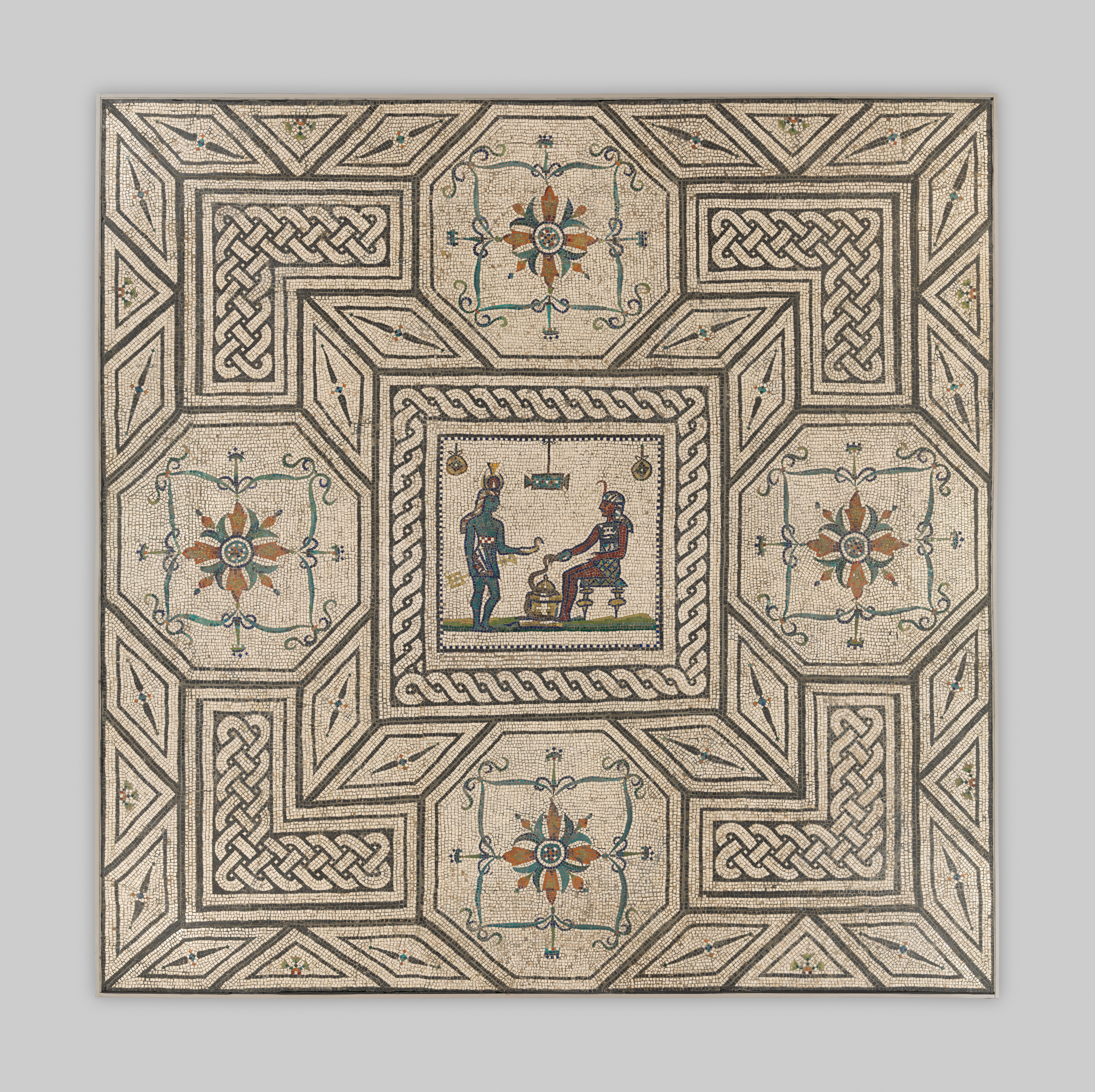
- Mosaic with Egyptian Scene (Metropolitan Museum of Art)

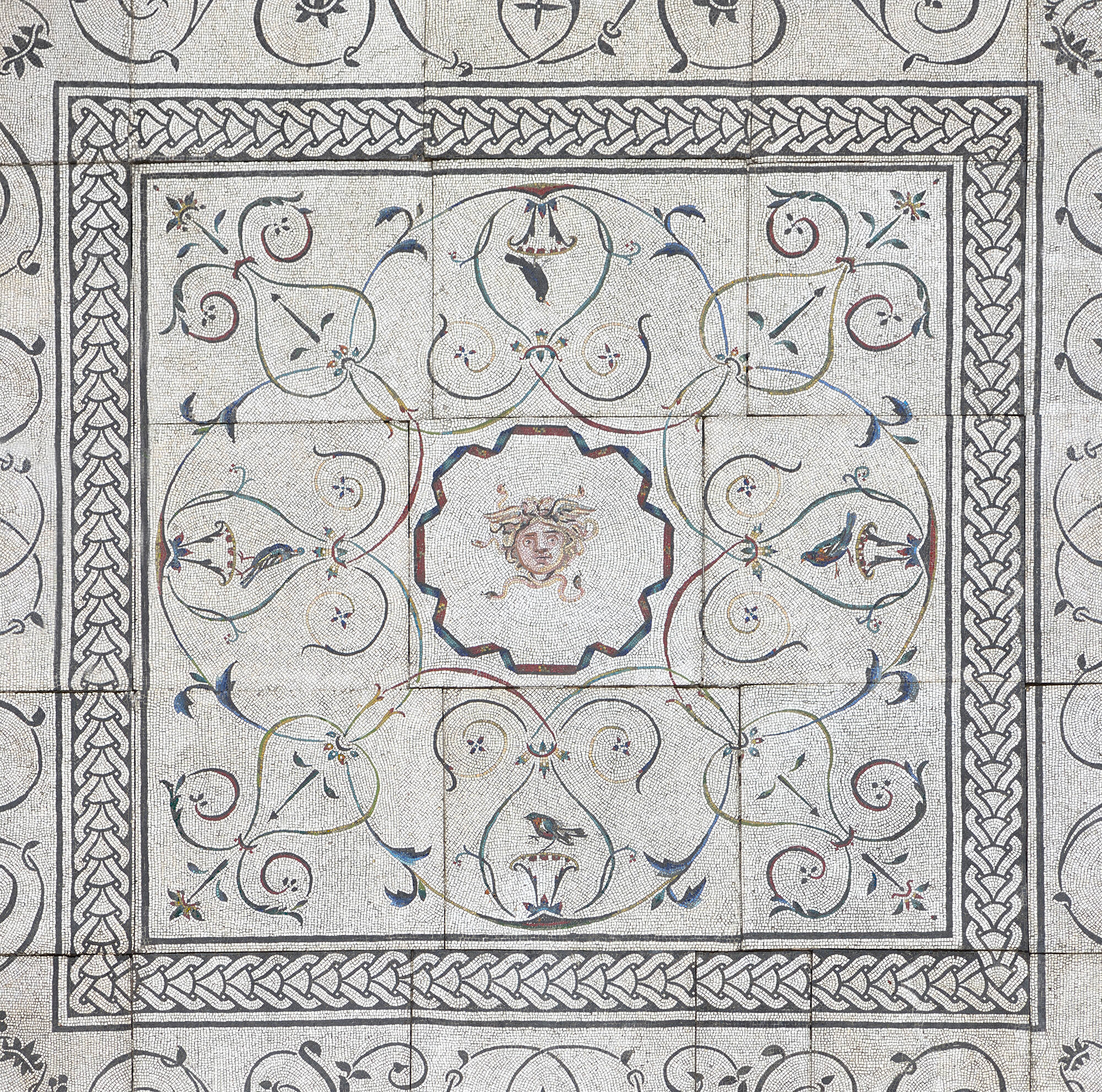
- Medusa Mosaic (Isabella Stewart Gardner Museum)
- Type: Roman mosaic
- Material: Stone and glass
- Size: Egyptian - 316.2 x 316.9 cm Medusa - 500.4 x 1258.1 cm
- Created: 117-150
- Discovered: 1892; Prima Porta, Via Flaminia, Lazio, Italy
- Place: New York City; Boston
- Present location: Metropolitan Museum of Art, Isabella Stewart Gardner Museum
- Identification: MET - 45.16.2; Isabella Stewart Gardner - S5c5
- Culture: Roman

The Montebello Mosaics refers to a set of two surviving Roman mosaics from the Hadrianic and Antonine era (118-150 AD), that were discovered in 1892 around Prima Porta, along the Via Flaminia. One consisting of an imitation Egyptian art, and another depicting Medusa, they both were acquired by American collectors at the turn of the 20th century, with the former now on display at the Metropolitan Museum of Art and the latter in the Courtyard of the Isabella Stewart Gardner Museum.

== Discovery ==
In March 1892, the ruins of a Roman bath were uncovered on the property of Cavaliere Alessandro Piacetini in Prima Porta, 8 miles north of Rome, along the Via Flaminia road, consisting of a hypocaust. Seven mosaics were documented in situ according to the Notizie degli Scavi excavation report, but the whereabouts of the five remain unknown. The Baedeker Travel Guide for Italy recorded the instance of the mosaics in 1893 as a destination to be seen when travelling around Rome.

== Description ==
=== The Medusa Mosaic ===
The mosaics were divided up in the years after the discovery, and in 1897, the Medusa Mosaic was acquired by Isabella Stewart Gardner through an antiquities dealer from Rome, Pio Marinangeli for £10,000. The mosaic was divided into pieces and subsequently reassembled in Boston, finally fully assembled in the Central Courtyard of the present museum in 1902.

Measuring 16 square feet, the Medusa Mosaic depicts the Gorgon with pink and pale yellow complexion with dark orange for shading. The ribbon around the head consisting of reds and yellows, with blues and greens accentuate three dimensional form. Birds perched on the bordering blossoms, utilizing black with a blue striped wing, orange eyes and bills. The outer borders are black and white as to focus the viewer towards the central image.

The mosaic was made to resemble the Second and Third Pompeian Styles (25 AD), but brick stamps on the mosaics indicate that it was a revival of the retro, during the reign of Hadrian. Medusa's head long symbolized the protective figure for the owners, and thus the image has been depicted in many instances of Greek and Roman households.

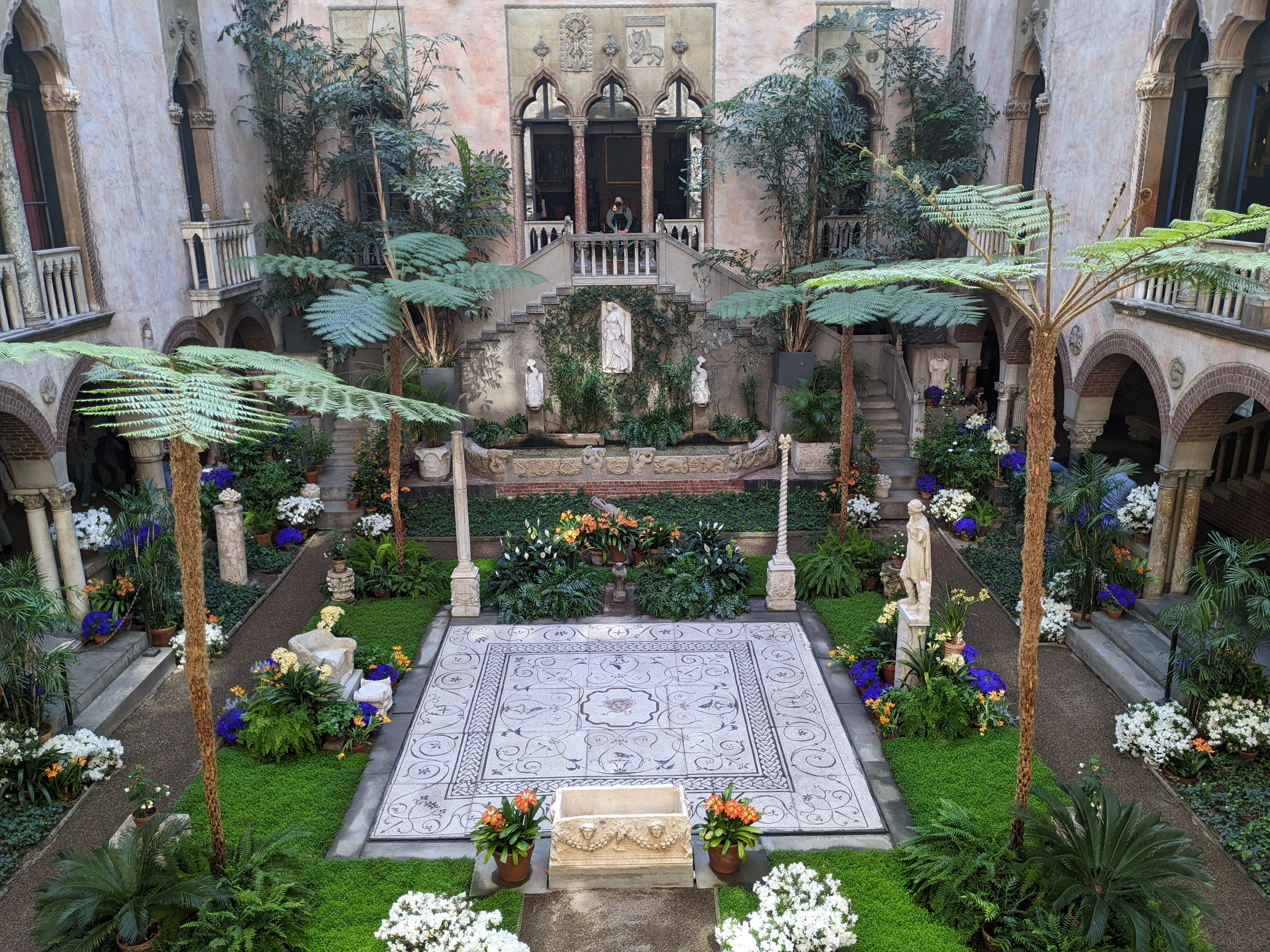
The Medusa Mosaic now adorn the Isabella Stewart Gardner Museum Courtyard

=== Egyptian-Style Mosaic ===
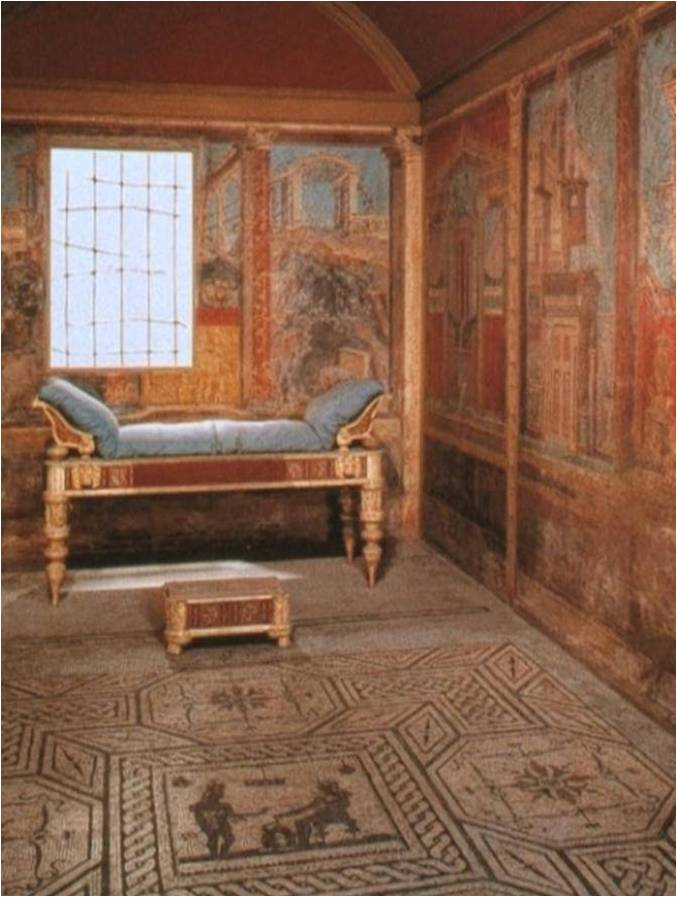
The Egyptian Mosaic in its former location in the MET's Boscoreale cubiculum

The Egyptian-Style Mosaic was the mosaic featured in the 1893 Baedeker Travel Guide after its emergence from the excavations. In 1906, the mosaic came under the ownership of American collector Susan Dwight Bliss, whereupon reassembly in New York City, it served as the floor of her residence.

In 1945, Bliss donated the mosaic to the Metropolitan Museum of Art. It once adorned the Great Hall to the MET, serving as the floor of the Cubiculum of Villa of P. Fannius Synistor (from Boscoreale). In 2006, it got separated from the cubiculum and became displayed separated in Gallery 165, in addition to receiving conservation treatment.

The Egyptian-Style Mosaic, 10 square feet, depicts what is assumed to depict a priest offering to a seated Isis, the priest with a shendyt, holding a thurible, the latter also with a shendyt adorned with a uraeus, and a patera. With the mosaic also consisting of a fusion of Roman styles, scholars generalize the art style as part of the Egyptian style being trendy in Roman popular culture, and thus, an early example of Orientalism.
