= Peggy Fogelman =

American museum director

Norma Jean Calderwood Director of the Isabella Stewart Gardner Museum
- Incumbent
- Assumed office January 2016
- Preceded by: Anne Hawley

Personal details
- Education: Johns Hopkins University (BA); Brown University (MA)
- Occupation: Museum director

Peggy Fogelman is the Norma Jean Calderwood Director of the Isabella Stewart Gardner Museum in Boston, Massachusetts. Fogelman has served in this role since January 2016, after Anne Hawley stepped down after 26 years as director of the museum. Fogelman is the Isabella Stewart Gardner Museum's fifth director.

== Early life education ==
Fogelman is a Connecticut native. She received a Bachelor's degree from Johns Hopkins University in Art History, Criticism and Conservation and earned a Master's degree from Brown University in Art History.

== Career ==
She began her career at the J. Paul Getty Museum in Los Angeles, California as a sculpture curator and stayed at the museum for 20 years, later transitioning to the museum's Assistant Director for Education and Interpretation.

In 2007, she moved to Massachusetts to serve as the Director of Education and Interpretation at the Peabody Essex Museum.

Two years later, she moved to New York City after being hired as the Chairman of Education at the Metropolitan Museum of Art where she spent four years.

Next, she served for a year as the Acting Director of the Morgan Library & Museum, also in New York City, and then the museum's Director of Collections. As Director of Collections, she oversaw the museum's curatorial department, conservation department, and exhibition program.

In late 2015, the Isabella Stewart Gardner Museum named Fogelman as their new director after an eight-month search. Like the Morgan, the Isabella Stewart Gardner Museum also began as a private art collection.

== Personal life ==
Fogelman's longtime partner is John D. Childs. Childs is the Chief of Collection Services and the Director of the Phillips Library at the Peabody Essex Museum in Salem, Massachusetts and was previously the Head of Conservation at the National September 11 Memorial & Museum in New York City.
