= Anne Hawley =

American museum director

Norma Jean Calderwood Director of the Isabella Stewart Gardner Museum
- In office 1989–2015
- Succeeded by: Peggy Fogelman

Executive Director of Massachusetts Council on the Arts and Humanities
- In office 1977–1989

Personal details
- Born: November 3, 1943 (age 83)
- Spouse: Urs P. Gauchat
- Education: University of Iowa, George Washington University
- Occupation: Museum director

Anne Hawley (born November 3, 1943) was the Norma Jean Calderwood Director of the Isabella Stewart Gardner Museum in Boston from 1989 until 2015. Founded in 1903 and one of Boston's most important cultural institutions, the museum is a highly unique installation of Gardner’s private collection, considered to be a work of art in totality. Hawley stepped down from the position at the end of 2015 with plans to continue working with artists and the artistic community. She has been named a Resident Fellow at Harvard's Institute of Politics, beginning in spring 2016.

== Background and education ==
Anne Hawley was born on November 3, 1943, in Iowa City and raised on a family farm near West Liberty, Iowa. She studied vocal music for many years. She holds a Bachelor of Arts from the University of Iowa Iowa and a Master of Arts from George Washington University. She also attended the Senior Executive Program at Harvard Kennedy School. Early in her career, Hawley worked as a research associate with the National Urban League and then with the Ford Foundation Study in Leadership in Public Education. She then moved to Massachusetts, where she became the founding executive director of the Cultural Education Collaborative in 1974. In 1977, Hawley became executive director of the Massachusetts Council on the Arts and Humanities where she served until her appointment to the Gardner in 1989. She holds Honorary Doctorate degrees from Williams College, Babson College, Emmanuel College, Emerson College, Lesley University, and Montserrat College of Art.

== Career ==
=== Gardner Museum ===
In 1989, Hawley became the fourth museum director of Isabella Stewart Gardner Museum in Boston, Massachusetts. Hawley made it her mission to ensure that the institution would not only preserve Isabella Stewart Gardner’s extraordinary collection, but also serve as a dynamic cultural resource for artists, musicians, scholars, visitors, and the Greater Boston community, just as it did in Mrs. Gardner’s day. Modeled after a Venetian palazzo, the galleries surround a courtyard and are home to paintings, sculptures, textiles, furniture, books, journals and letters. Included in the collection are masterpieces by Rembrandt, Raphael, Titian, Michelangelo, Whistler, and Sargent.

Hawley expanded the Museum’s staff and board of trustees; created curatorial positions and a board of overseers; mounted scholarly exhibitions centered on the art from the collection; established an Artist-in-Residency program and showcased the artists’ work; launched new programs in music, education, and landscape; spearheaded the modernization of crucial infrastructure improvements in the historic palace; completed several full–gallery restorations and led successful fundraising efforts to give the Museum a solid endowment.

As part of a $180 million capital campaign, she oversaw the effort to build an addition designed by Pritzker Architecture Prize-winning architect Renzo Piano. The new wing, opened in January 2012, helps to preserve the historic palace and provides space for programming and services relevant to today’s museum visitors. Hawley’s book, Isabella Stewart Gardner Museum: Daring by Design, published in 2014, describes the Museum’s unique history and the process of designing the new addition with Piano.

On March 18, 1990, within 6 months of Hawley taking the director position, two thieves, dressed as Boston police officers, talked their way into the Museum and stole 13 masterpieces valued at $500 million, including works by Rembrandt, Vermeer, Manet, and Degas. It is the largest art theft in the world and still remains unsolved. In conjunction with the Federal Bureau of Investigation and the U.S. Attorney’s Office, the investigation is active and focused on recovering the art. In 1994 at Hawley’s urging, Senator Ted Kennedy helped pass legislation that made art theft a federal crime and increased the statute of limitations from five to fifteen years.

In December 2015, Hawley stepped down as the museum director.

== Other activities ==
Hawley serves as a trustee on the boards of Save Venice Inc., Boston Mutual Life Insurance Co., and Fenway Alliance. Board service previously included the Doris Duke Charitable Foundation, Ford Foundation’s National Arts Stabilization Fund, Old Sturbridge Village, Massachusetts Woman’s Forum, and Citizen’s Bank. Prior to her appointment to the Gardner Museum, she served as Executive Director of the Massachusetts Council on the Arts and Humanities, a state agency, and was instrumental in the passage of new laws supporting cultural life in Massachusetts, including the Cultural Education Act. Early in her career she founded the Cultural Education Committee, an organization dedicated to stimulating arts public policy and arts education.

As Director of the Massachusetts Council on the Arts and Humanities from 1978 to 1989, she pioneered new initiatives to advance the arts in the public interest. Through a New Works program that funded artistic commissions, she engaged museums and performing arts organizations to commission and present the works of living artists from around the world. A statewide design program funded rural planning initiatives to protect public land and small town commons; bridge design workshops for the Department of Public Works introduced state engineers to internationally renowned designers including Christian Menn who was later commissioned to design the Zakim Bridge in Boston. Legislation was passed enabling the culture sector to participate in borrowing from the state bonding agencies that continues to assist in the financing of capital projects today. Under her leadership, the state arts agency grew to the second largest arts council in the country ($23 million annually) and administered the widest array of public programs from finance to international exchange.

== Awards and honors ==
Anne Hawley was awarded an Honorary Doctorate by Emmanuel College, Boston, at their Commencement on May 12, 2012, where Ms. Hawley was Commencement speaker. She was also awarded Honorary Doctorates by Williams College, Babson College, Leslie College, and the Montserrat College of Art.

She has also received the Lyman Ziegler Award for Outstanding Service to the Commonwealth, 1988; Boston Society of Architects Award for Outstanding Contribution to Architecture in Boston, 1989; Fulbright Fellowship, Argentina, 1986; Polaroid Travel Grant to study arts policy and programs in France, 1987; Fund for Mutual Understanding, Travel Grant to USSR, 1988; Women’s Travel Club, Travel Grant to study Italian design, 1982; Wheaton College Distinguished Fellow; Reginald Townsend Award, New England Society in the City of New York; the Pinnacle Award, 2013; the Godine Award for Service to the Community by Massachusetts College of Art and Design, 2012; and Women in Design Award from the Boston Society of Architects, 2015.

== Personal life ==
Hawley's husband is Urs P. Gauchat, an architect and Dean Emeritus of College of Architecture and Design at New Jersey Institute of Technology.

== Additional sources ==
- Isabella Stewart Gardner Museum, Daring By Design 2014 (Skira Rizzoli).
- Cotter, Holland (March 31, 1997). "Despite Devastating Losses, the Gardner Museum Is Rebounding". The New York Times.
- Goldfarb, Hilliard. The Isabella Stewart Gardner Museum. Yale University Press, 1995.
