= Isabella Stewart Gardner Museum =

Art museum in Boston, Massachusetts

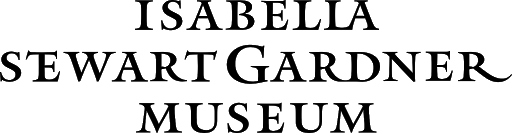

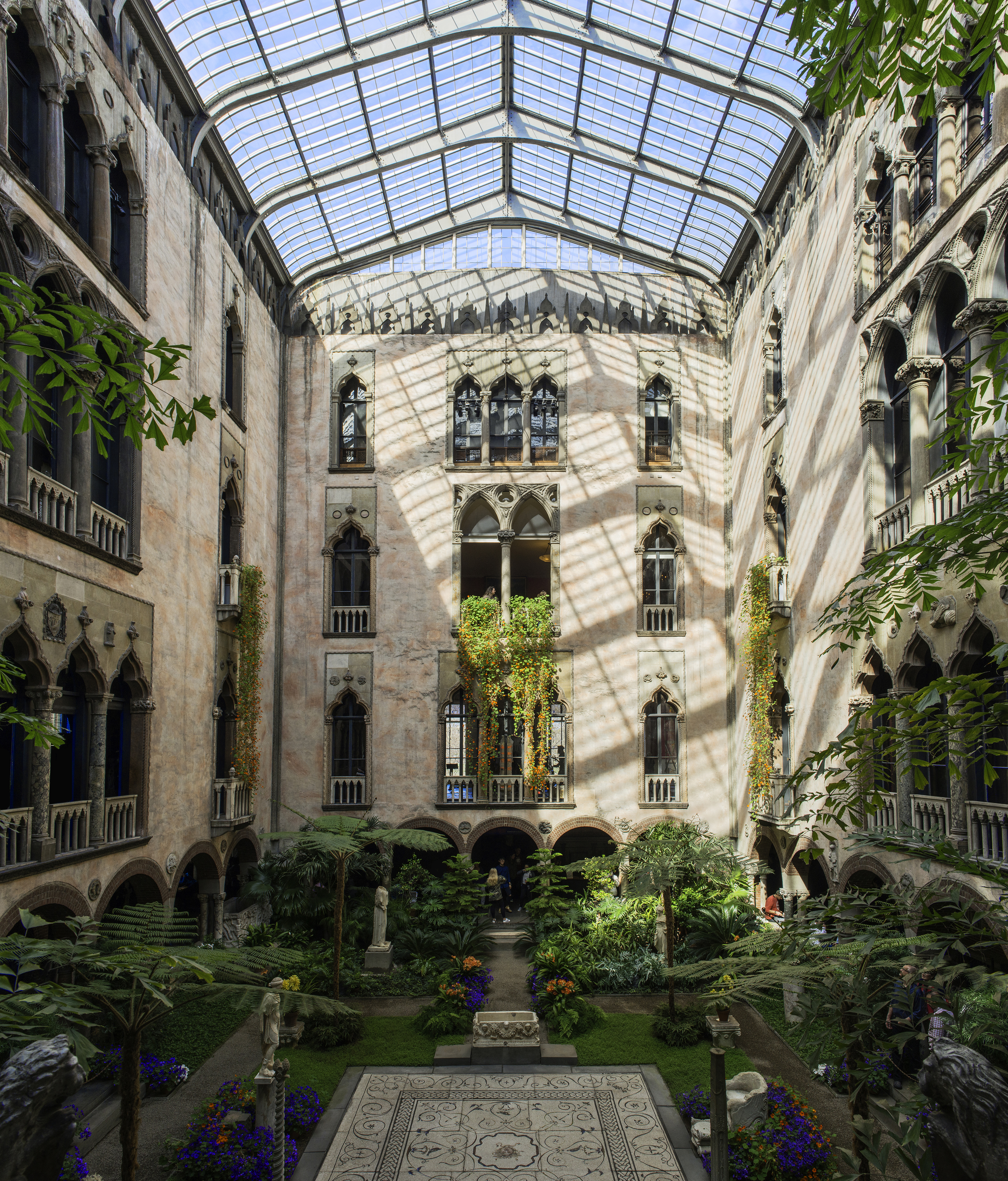
- Courtyard

- Location within Boston
- Former name: Fenway Court
- Established: 1903; 123 years ago
- Location: 25 Evans Way; Boston, MA 02115
- Coordinates: 42°20′19″N 71°5′56″W
- Type: Art museum
- Accreditation: American Alliance of Museums
- Founder: Isabella Stewart Gardner
- Director: Peggy Fogelman
- Public transit access: (E branch) Museum of Fine Arts
- Website: gardnermuseum.org
- Isabella Stewart Gardner Museum
- U.S. National Register of Historic Places
- Boston Landmark
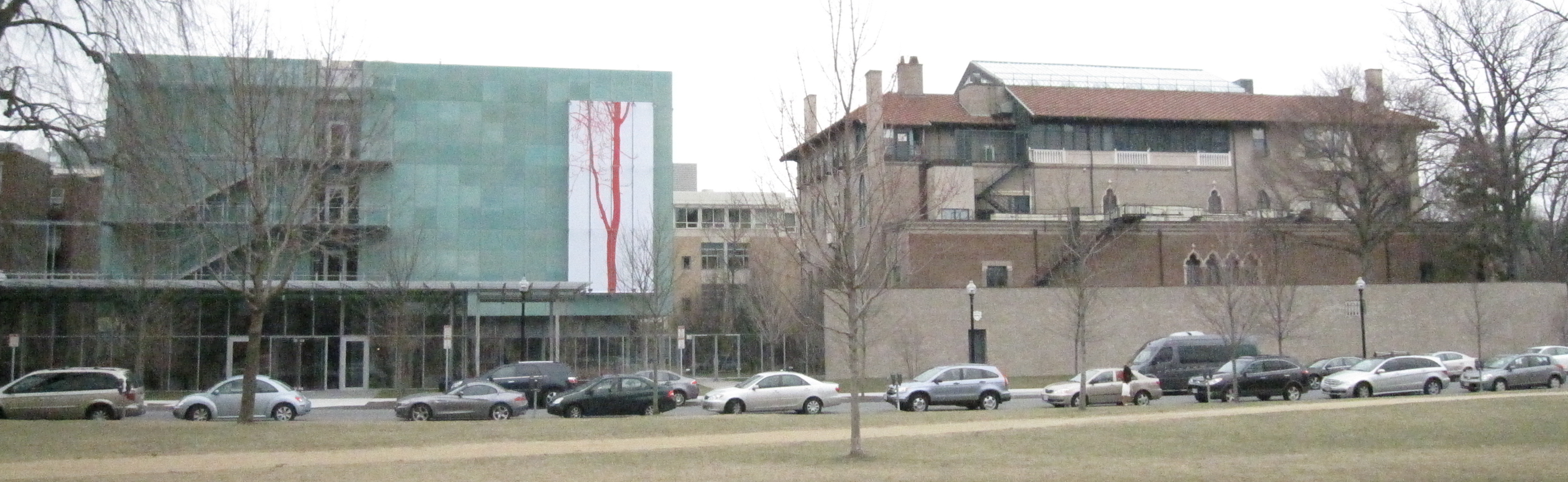
- Gardner Museum in 2012, original building at right
- Built: 1896–1903
- Architect: Willard T. Sears
- NRHP reference No.: 83000603

Significant dates
- Added to NRHP: January 27, 1983
- Designated BOSL: April 23, 2013

The Isabella Stewart Gardner Museum is an art museum in Boston, Massachusetts, which houses significant examples of European, Asian, and American art. Its collection includes paintings, sculpture, tapestries, and decorative arts. It was founded by Isabella Stewart Gardner, whose will called for her art collection to be permanently exhibited "for the education and enjoyment of the public forever."

The museum opened in 1903. An auxiliary wing designed by Italian architect Renzo Piano, adjacent to the original structure near the Back Bay Fens, was completed in 2012.

In 1990, thirteen of the museum's works were stolen; the crime remains unsolved, and the works, valued at an estimated $500 million, have not been recovered.

== History ==
The museum was built in 1898–1901 by Isabella Stewart Gardner (1840–1924), an American art collector, philanthropist, and patron of the arts in the style of a 15th-century Venetian palace. It opened to the public in 1903.

Gardner began collecting seriously after she received a large inheritance from her father in 1891. Her purchase of Johannes Vermeer's The Concert (c. 1664) at auction in Paris in 1892 was her first major acquisition. In 1894, Bernard Berenson offered his services in helping her acquire a Botticelli. With his help, Gardner became the first American to own a painting by the Renaissance master. Berenson helped acquire nearly 70 works of art for her collection.

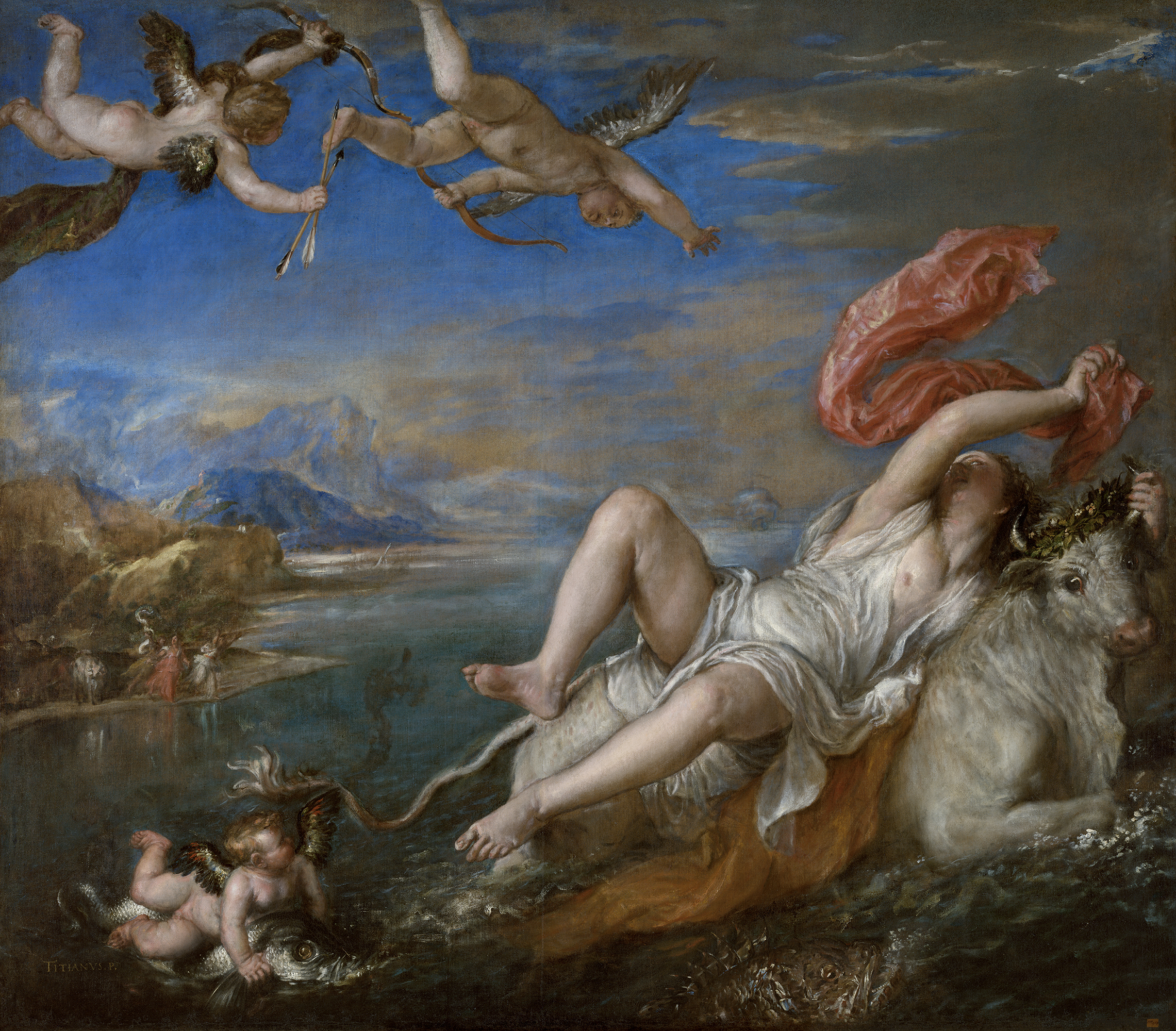
The Rape of Europa (1562) by Titian is one of the most famous works in the museum

After her husband John L. Gardner's death in 1898, Isabella Gardner realized their shared dream of building a suitable space to exhibit their treasures. She purchased land in the marshy Fenway area of Boston, and hired architect Willard T. Sears to build Fenway Court, modeled on the Renaissance palaces of Venice. Gardner was deeply involved in every aspect of the design, leading Sears to quip that he was merely the structural engineer making Gardner's design possible. After the construction of the building was complete, Gardner spent a year installing her collection in a way that evokes intimate responses to the art, mixing paintings, furniture, textiles and objects from different cultures and periods among well-known European paintings and sculpture.

The museum opened on January 1, 1903, with a grand celebration featuring a performance by members of the Boston Symphony Orchestra and a menu that included champagne and doughnuts. In 1909, the Museum of Fine Arts moved to its new home close by.

During Gardner's lifetime, she welcomed artists, performers, and scholars to Fenway Court to draw inspiration from the rich collection and dazzling Venetian setting, including John Singer Sargent, Charles Martin Loeffler, and Ruth St. Denis, among others. Gardner also occasionally hosted artists' exhibitions within Fenway Court, including one of Anna Coleman Ladd. Today, the museum's contemporary artist-in-residence program, courtyard garden displays, concerts, and innovative education programs continue Isabella Gardner's legacy.

When Gardner died in 1924, her will created an endowment of $1 million and outlined stipulations for the support of the museum, including the charge that her collection be permanently exhibited "for the education and enjoyment of the public forever" according to her aesthetic vision and intent.

Gardner appointed her secretary and the former librarian of the Museum of Fine Arts, Boston, Morris Carter (1877–1965) as the museum's first director. Carter catalogued the entire collection and wrote Gardner's definitive biography, Isabella Stewart Gardner and Fenway Court. George L. Stout (1897–1978) was the second director, from 1955 to 1970. The father of modern conservation, Stout ensured the long-term preservation of the collection and historic structure. Rollin Van Nostrand Hadley (1927–1992) became the third director in 1970. Hadley increased visiting hours, instituted the Membership Program and added a cafe. Hadley also wrote several catalogs for the museum, produced Fenway Court, an annual scholarly publication, and wrote the 1987 book The Letters of Bernard Berenson and Isabella Stewart Gardner (Northeastern University Press). Anne Hawley was director from 1989 until 2015. Peggy Fogelman, the Norma Jean Calderwood Director, began her tenure as director of the museum in 2016.

=== Art theft of 1990 ===
George L. Stout, a director of the Gardener Museum, realized from his work during World War II, of the need for artwork to be portable. Many large pieces in the collection, have their frames made as a frame within a frame with only thumb screws to keep it in place. This way artwork could rapidly be removed by turning little thumb screws, leaving the much larger frame behind.

Early in the morning of March 18, 1990, two thieves disguised as police officers robbed the museum of thirteen works worth some $500 million – the greatest known property theft in history. Among the works was The Concert (c. 1664), one of only 34 known by Johannes Vermeer and thought to be the most valuable unrecovered painting at over $200 million. Also missing is The Storm on the Sea of Galilee (1633), Rembrandt's only known seascape. Some of the canvases were crudely cut out of their stretchers.

The works have not been recovered. The museum initially offered a reward of $5 million for information leading to recovery of the art, doubled in May 2017 to $10 million. Empty frames hang in the Dutch Room gallery as placeholders for the missing works. The selection of stolen works puzzled experts, as more valuable artworks were present in the museum. According to the FBI, the stolen artwork was moved through the region and offered for sale in Philadelphia during the early 2000s. They believe the thieves were members of a criminal organization based in the mid-Atlantic and New England. The statute of limitations on the theft has expired but criminal charges could be laid if an individual is found to be in possession of stolen property.

In April 2021, Netflix began streaming a four-part documentary about the theft: This Is a Robbery: The World’s Biggest Art Heist.

=== Extension and preservation project ===
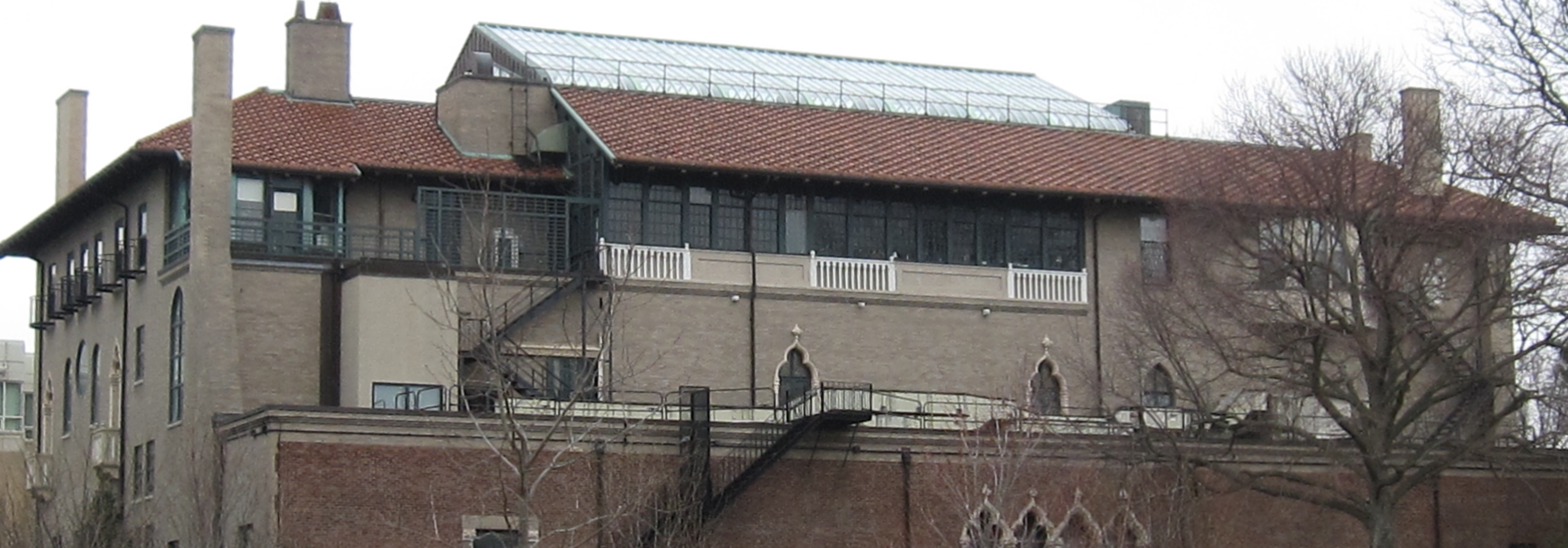
Glass skylights illuminate the central atrium of the original building

In 2002, after a two-year master planning process, the museum's board of trustees determined that a new wing was necessary to preserve the historic building and to provide improved spaces for programs that continue Isabella Gardner's legacy. In 2004, Pritzker Prize–winning architect Renzo Piano and the Renzo Piano Building Workshop (Genoa, Italy) were selected to design the new wing. In 2009, the final approval for the expansion project was given, but there was much debate about the carriage house. The carriage house, originally built in 1907, was argued to be important for the intent of the first owners, yet the building was torn down in hopes of having the museum preserve the main building. In 2016, the new wing was praised for its appearance by the Boston Society of Architects and awarded a medal for its beauty. The design for the new wing is conceived as a respectful complement to the historic Museum building in scale, form, and materials.

The project adds 70,000 square feet (6,500 m^{2}) consisting of two new buildings. The first building attaches to the original museum and takes on the appearance of four stories in glass and copper. The second building is smaller and is used for greenhouses and living quarters. The new expansion includes spaces for visitor services, concerts, special exhibitions, and education and landscape programs, furthering Isabella Gardner's legacy in art, music, and horticulture while reducing 21st-century strain on the collection and galleries. The project was completed in 2012, and cost $118 million.

== Design ==
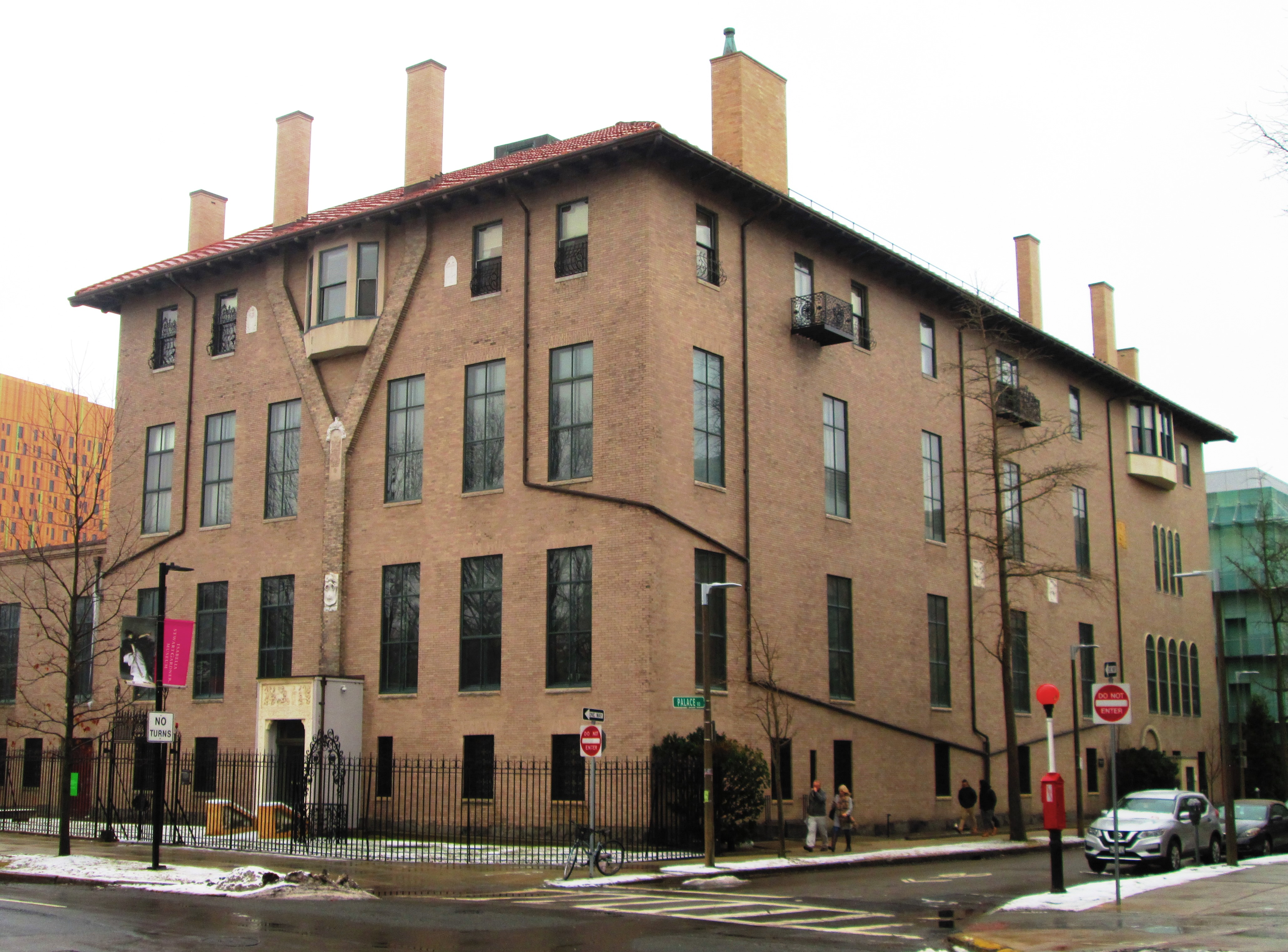
"Fenway Court", the museum's original building

Built to evoke a 15th-century Venetian palace, the museum building provides an atmospheric setting for Gardner's inventive creation. Gardner hired Willard T. Sears to design the building near the marshy Back Bay Fens to house her growing art collection. Inside the museum, three floors of galleries surround a garden courtyard adorned with Roman mosaic, blooming with life in all seasons. The fourth floor was Gardner's private apartments, now used for administration, and rarely for exhibits.

It is a common misconception that the building was brought to Boston from Venice and reconstructed. It was built from the ground up in Boston out of new materials, though it incorporates numerous architectural elements removed from European Gothic and Renaissance structures, worked into the design of the turn-of-the-century building. Special tiles were custom designed for the floors, modern concrete was used for some of the structural elements, and antique capitals sit atop modern columns. The interior garden courtyard is covered by a glass roof, with steel support structure original to the building. The Gardner Museum is much admired for the intimate atmosphere in which its works of art are displayed and for its flower-filled courtyard. Most of the art pieces are unlabeled, and the generally low lighting is more akin to a private house than a modern art museum.

In 1983, the museum was listed in the National Register of Historic Places. In 2013, the museum was designated a Boston Landmark by the Boston Landmarks Commission.

== Collection ==
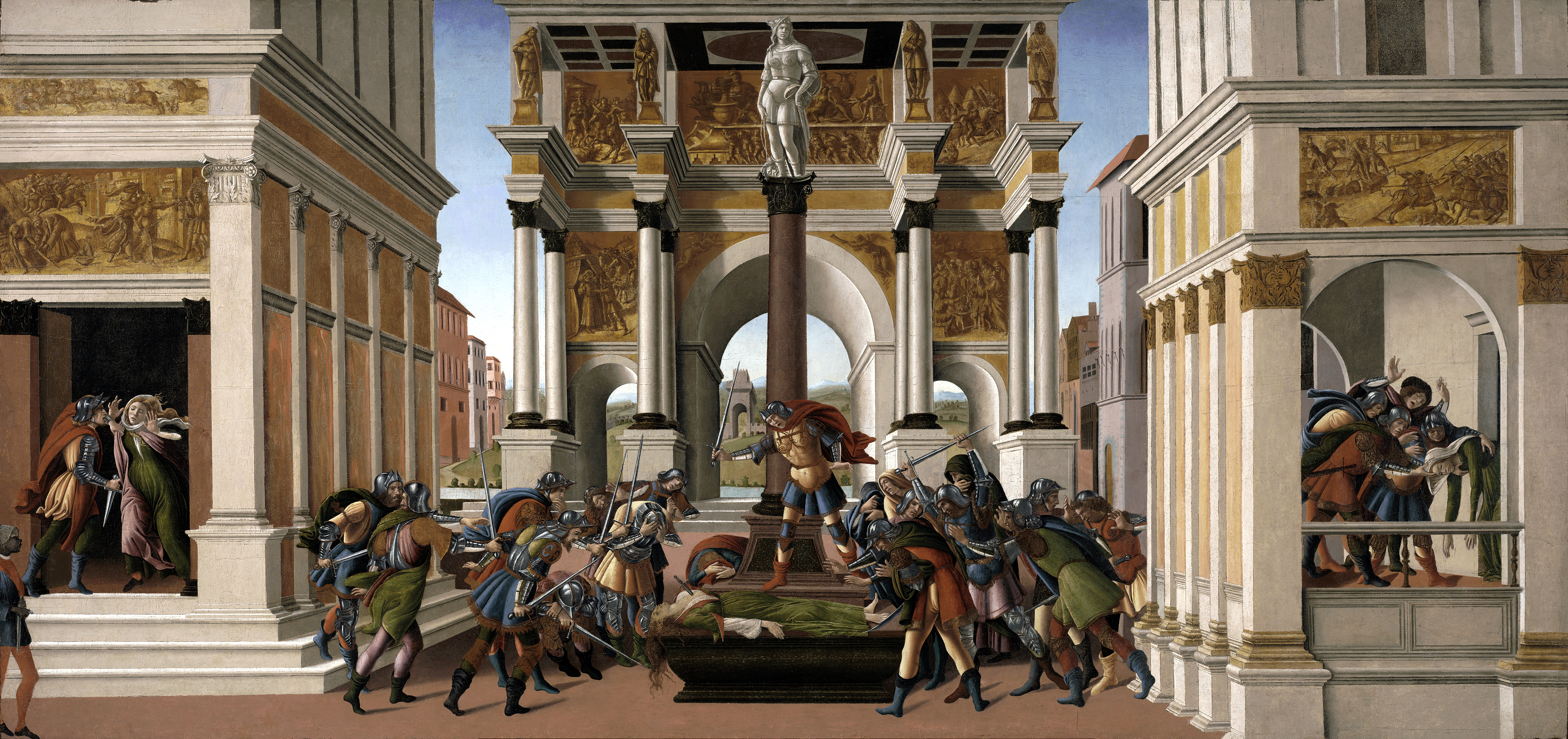
Sandro Botticelli, The Story of Lucretia (1496–1504)

Gardner collected and carefully displayed a collection of more than 7500 paintings, sculptures, furniture, textiles, silver, ceramics, 1500 rare books, and 7000 archival objects from ancient Rome, Medieval Europe, Renaissance Italy, Asia, the Islamic world, and 19th-century France and America. Among the artists represented in the galleries are Titian, Rembrandt, Michelangelo, Raphael, Botticelli, Manet, Degas, Whistler and Sargent. The first Matisse to enter an American collection is housed in the Yellow Room.

Well-known artworks in the museum's collection include Titian's The Rape of Europa, John Singer Sargent's El Jaleo and Portrait of Isabella Stewart Gardner, Fra Angelico's Death and Assumption of the Virgin, Rembrandt's Self-Portrait, Aged 23, Cellini's Bindo Altoviti, Piero della Francesca's Hercules, and Botticelli's The Story of Lucretia.

The archives hold more than 7,000 letters from 1,000 correspondents, including Henry Adams, T.S. Eliot, Sarah Bernhardt, and Oliver Wendell Holmes, in addition to travel albums, dealer receipts, and guest books.

The galleries also contain Gardner's little-known but extensive book collection that includes early-print editions and manuscripts of Dante, works by miniaturist Jean Bourdichon, incunables, and illuminated manuscripts.

== Current programs ==
The museum regularly produces scholarly exhibitions, lectures, family programs, and symposia that provide insights into the historic collection. Through the Artist-in-Residence program, artists in many disciplines are invited to live at and draw inspiration from the museum. The museum often hosts exhibitions of contemporary art, performances, and programs by those selected. The Gardner's concert series welcomes musicians and emerging artists to perform classical masterpieces, new music, and jazz on Sunday afternoons and select Thursday evenings. The musical program is also available through concert videos, audio recordings, and a free classical music podcast.

The Gardner is part of the Monuments Men and Women Museum Network, launched in 2021 by the Monuments Men Foundation for the Preservation of Art.

The Gardner's central courtyard features constantly rotating seasonal floral displays which reflect Isabella's personal tastes and passions in gardening. Most of the plants which are displayed are grown and kept off-site in the museum's nursery, and are then later shipped to the museum for each seasonal display. Some current seasonal displays include; Hanging Nasturtiums, Hydrangeas, and Midwinter Tropics.

The Museum offers free admission to all those named Isabella, for life.

== Recent exhibitions ==
=== Exhibitions ===
The Gardner's exhibitions since 2002 include:

Exhibition Title	Date
Cosme Tura: Painting and Design in Renaissance Ferrara	January 30 – May 12, 2002
Making of the Museum: Isabella Stewart Gardner as Collector, Architect, and Designer	April 23 – August 24, 2003
Raphael, Cellini and a Renaissance Banker: The Patronage of Bindo Altoviti	October 8, 2003 – January 11, 2004
Gondola Days: Isabella Stewart Gardner and the Palazzo Barbaro Circle	April 21 – August 15, 2004
Off the Wall: New Perspectives on Early Italian Art at the Gardner Museum	October 6, 2004 – January 9, 2005
Gentile Bellini and the East	December 14, 2005 – March 26, 2006
A Bronze Menagerie: Mat Weights of Early China	October 5, 2006 – January 14, 2007
Luxury for Export: Artistic Exchange between India and Portugal around 1600	February 8 – May 4, 2008
The Triumph of Marriage: Painted Cassoni of the Renaissance	October 16, 2008 – January 19, 2009
Journeys East: Isabella Stewart Gardner and Asia	February 21 – May 31, 2009
Modeling Devotion: Terra Cotta Sculpture in the Italian Renaissance	February 23 – May 23, 2010
Illuminating the Serenissima: Books of the Republic of Venice	May 3 – June 19, 2011
Anders Zorn: A European Artist Seduces America	February 28 – May 13, 2013
The Inscrutable Eye: Watercolors by John Singer Sargent in Isabella Stewart Gardner's Collection	October 31, 2013 – February 10, 2014
Donatello, Michelangelo, Cellini: Sculptors' Drawings from Renaissance Italy	October 23, 2014 – January 19, 2015
Ornament & Illusion: Carlo Crivelli of Venice	October 20, 2015 – January 25, 2016
Beyond Words: Italian Renaissance Books	September 22, 2016 – January 16, 2017
Beyond Words: Gardner's Literary World	September 22, 2016 – January 16, 2017
Off the Wall: Gardner and Her Masterpieces	March 10 – August 28, 2016
Henry James and American Painting	October 19, 2017 – January 16, 2018
Henry & Isabella: The Art of Friendship	October 19, 2017 – January 16, 2018
Close-Up: Piermatteo d'Amelia's Annunciation	February 1 – 27, 2017
Fra Angelico: Heaven on Earth	February 22 – May 20, 2018
Isabella's Relics	February 22 – May 20, 2018
Life, Death & Revelry: The Farnese Sarcophagus	June 14 – September 3, 2018
Common Threads: Weaving Stories Through Time	October 4, 2018 – January 13, 2019
Close Up: Sargent On Location: Gardner's First Artist-in-Residence	September 14, 2018 – January 19, 2019
Botticelli: Heronines + Heroes	February 14 - May 19, 2019
Close Up: Raphael and the Pope's Librarian	October 31, 2019 – January 30, 2020
Boston's Apollo: Thomas McKeller and John Singer Sargent	February 13 – October 12, 2020
Titian: Women, Myth & Power	August 12, 2021 – January 2, 2022
Betye Saar: Heart of a Wanderer	February 16, 2023 – May 21, 2023
Raqib Shaw: Ballads of East and West	February 15, 2024 – May 12, 2024
On Christopher Street: Transgender Portraits by Mark Seliger	June 13, 2024 – September 8, 2024
Waters of the Abyss: An Intersection of Spirit and Freedom	February 27, 2025 – May 25, 2025

=== Contemporary art exhibitions ===
The Gardner has also hosted the following exhibitions of contemporary art.

Exhibition Title	Date
Danijel Zezelj: Stray Dogs	June 24 – August 21, 2005
Variations On a Theme by Sol LeWitt and Paula Robison	September 23 – November 13, 2005
A Pagan Feast	November 22, 2005 – January 8, 2006
Henrik Håkansson: Cyanopsitta spixii Case Study #001	June 30 – September 17, 2006
Sculpture and Memory: Works from the Gardner and by Luigi Ontani	February 9 – May 6, 2007
Stefano Arienti: The Asian Shore	June 29 – October 14, 2007
Cliff Evans: Empyrean	November 9, 2007 – January 13, 2008
Luisa Rabbia: Travels with Isabella, Travel Scrapbooks 1883/2008	June 26 – September 28, 2008
Su-Mei Tse: Floating Memories	July 16 – October 18, 2009
Taro Shinoda: Lunar Reflections	November 5, 2009 – January 1, 2010
Once	June 18–20, 2010
Stefano Arienti: Ailanthus	2012
Points of View: 20 Years of Artists-in-Residence at the Gardner	January 19 – August 20, 2012
(TAPESTRY) RADIO ON: New Work by Victoria Morton at the Gardner	January 19 – May 28, 2012
Magic Moments: The Screen and the Eye–9 Artists 9 Projections	June 21 – August 20, 2012
Luisa Lambri: Portrait	January 19 – October 15, 2012
Raqs Media Collective: The Great Bare Mat and Constellation	September 20, 2012 – January 7, 2013
Stefano Arienti: Wild Carrot	June 2012 – April 2013
Untitled: Adam Pendleton	April – October 2013
Sophie Calle: Last Seen	October 24, 2013 – March 3, 2014
Carla Fernández: The Barefoot Designer: A Passion for Radical Design and Community	April 17 – September 1, 2014

== Gallery ==
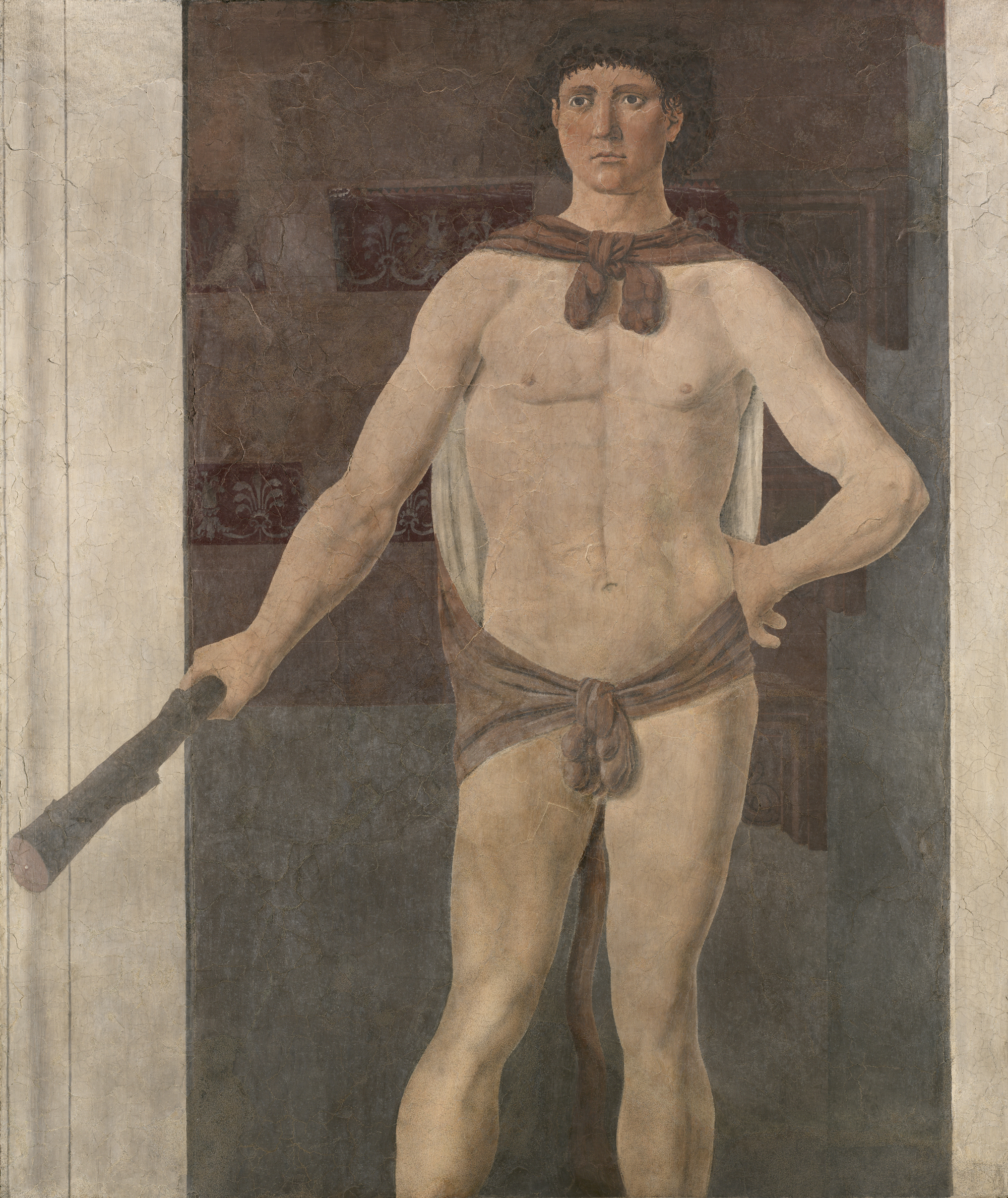
Hercules by Piero della Francesca (after 1465)

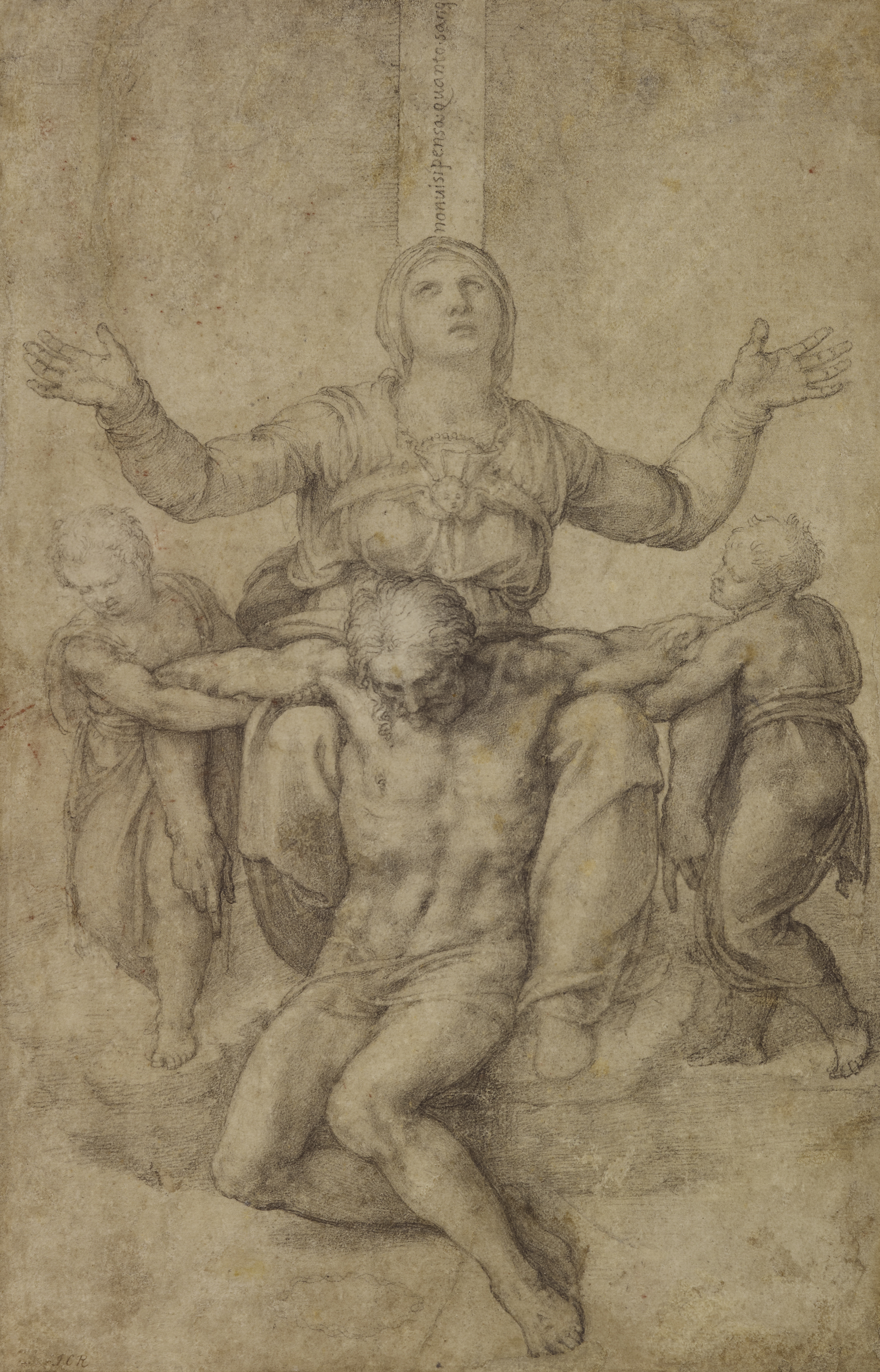
Study for the Colonna Pietà (c. 1538) by Michelangelo

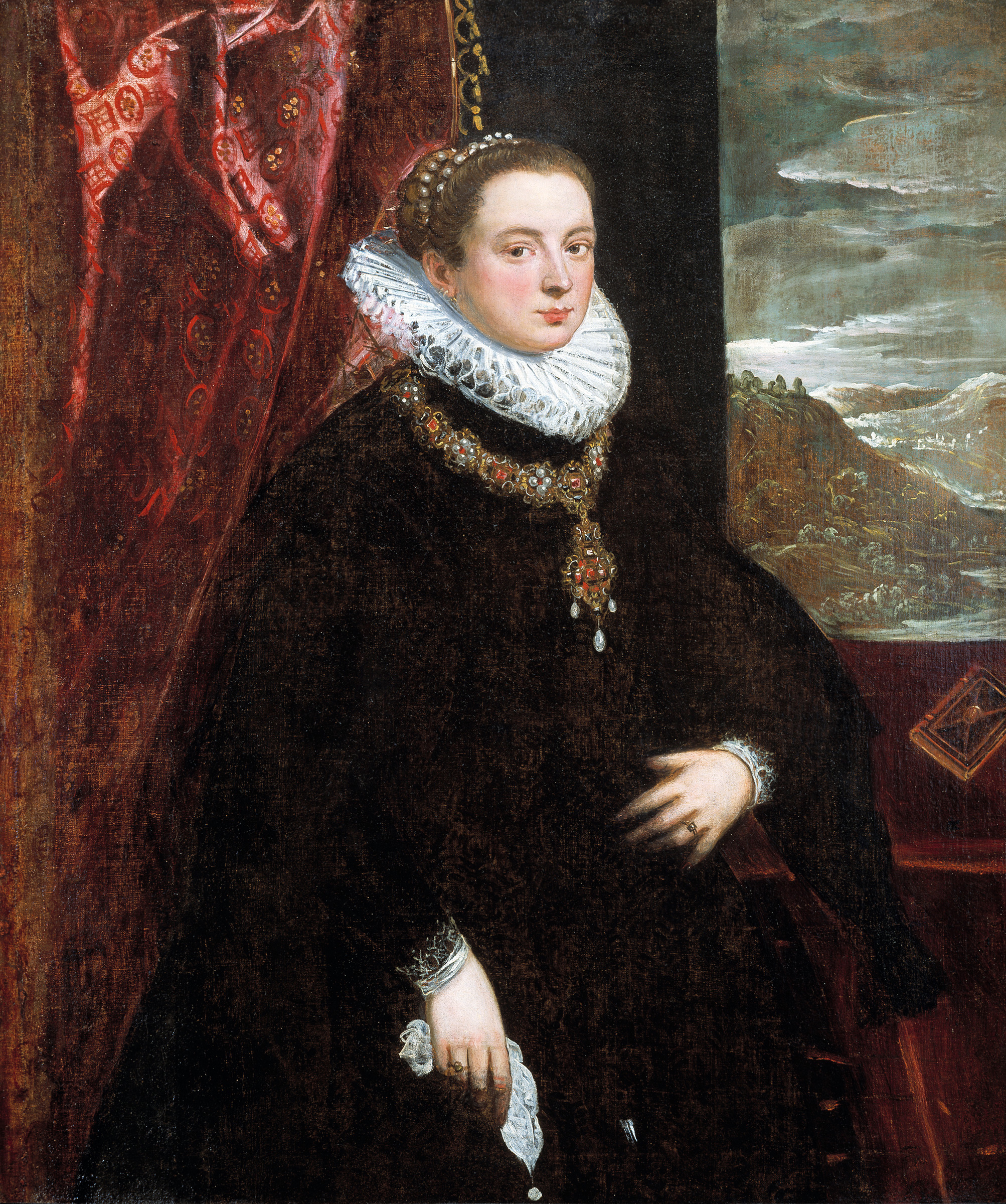
Lady in Black (1598–99) by Tintoretto

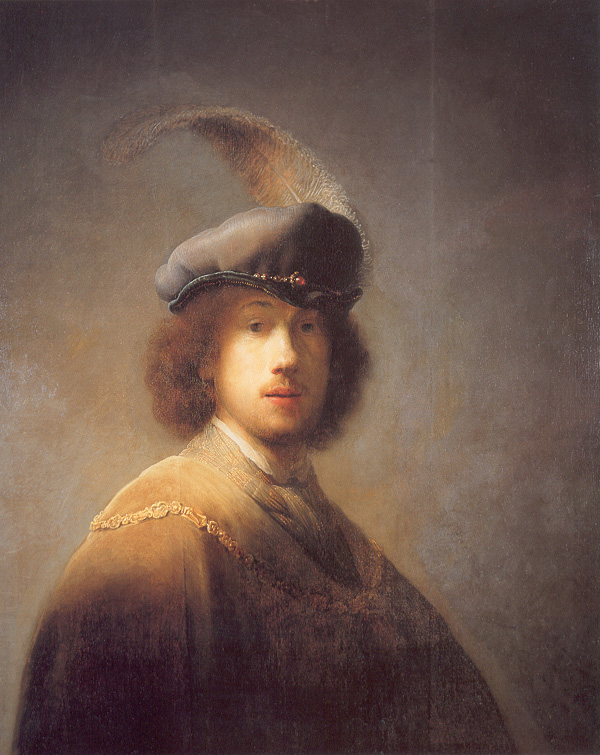
Self-portrait, aged 23 (1629) by Rembrandt

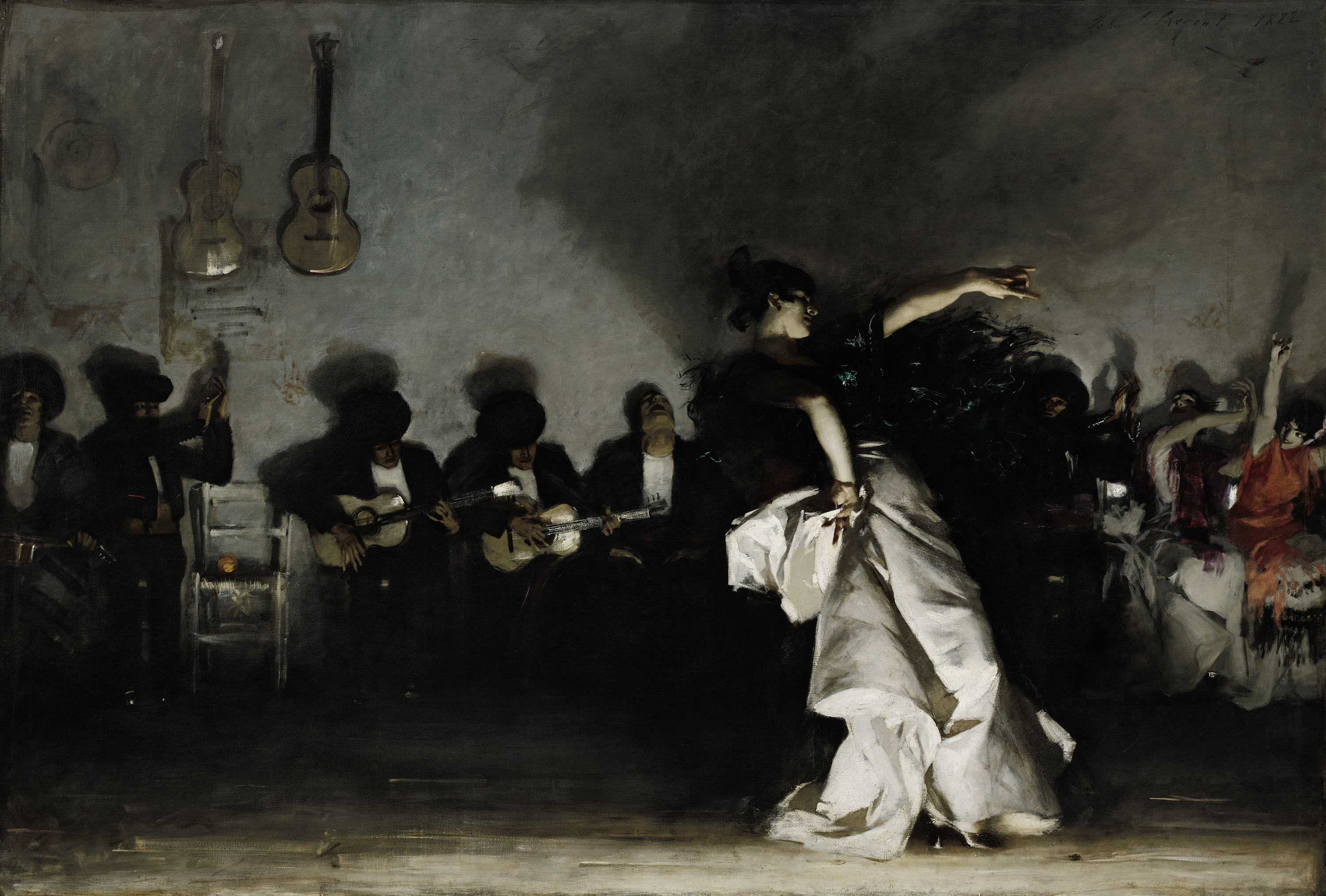
El Jaleo (1882) by John Singer Sargent

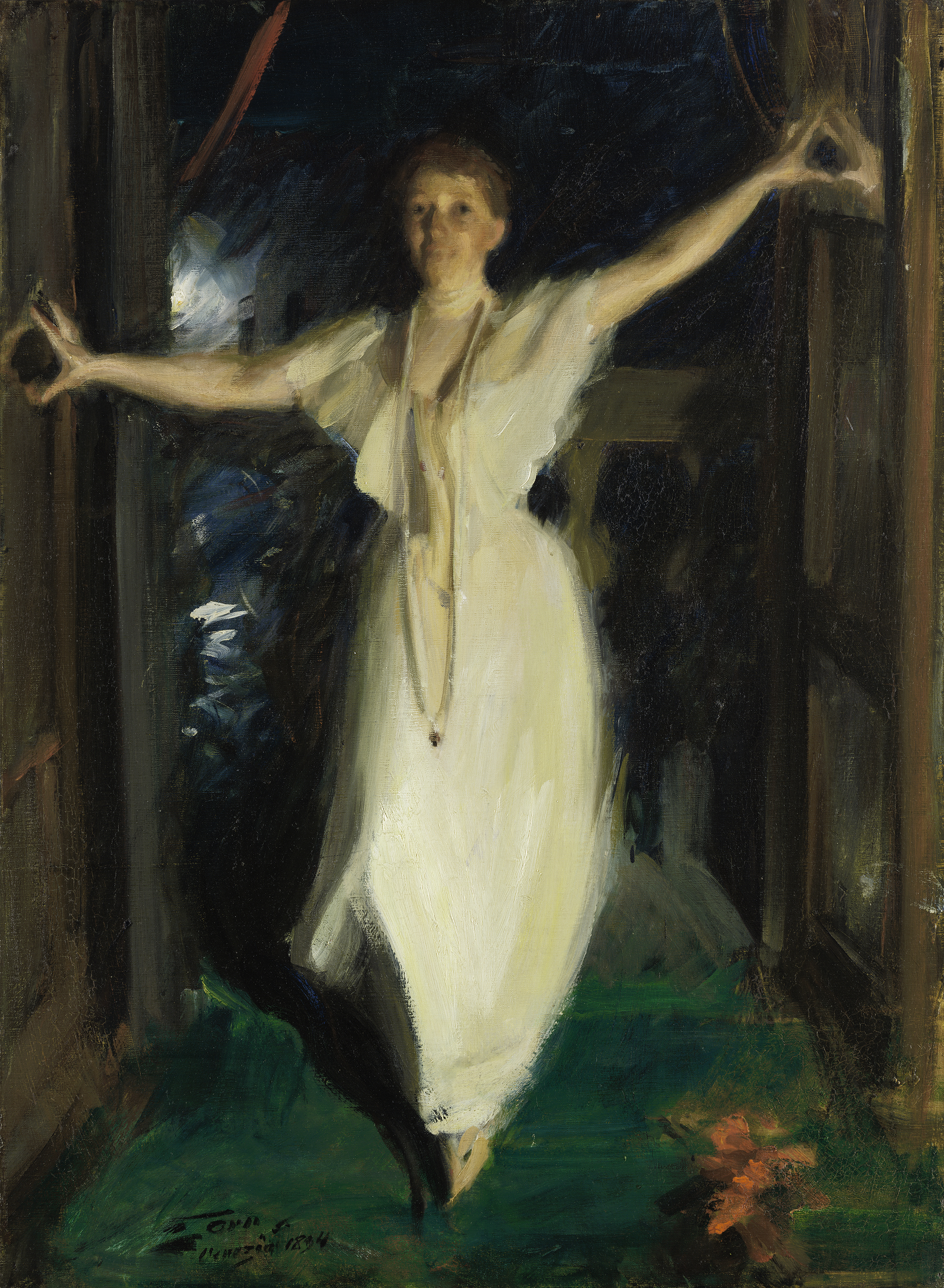
Isabella Stewart Gardner in Venice (1894) by Anders Zorn

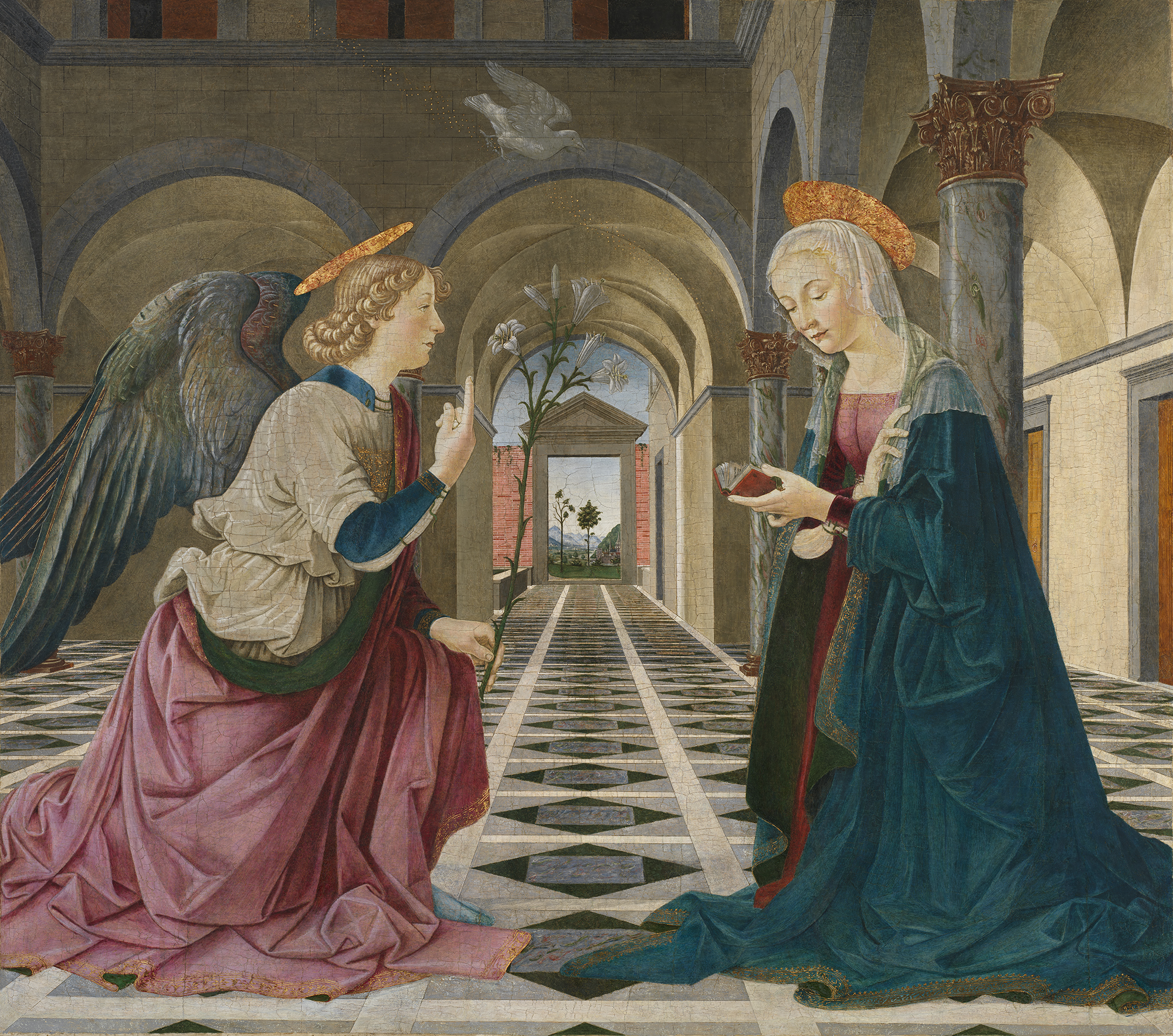
Annunciation (ca. 1485) by Piermatteo Lauro de' Manfredi da Amelia

== See also ==
- National Register of Historic Places listings in southern Boston, Massachusetts
