= Cubiculum =

Room offering privacy in ancient Roman houses

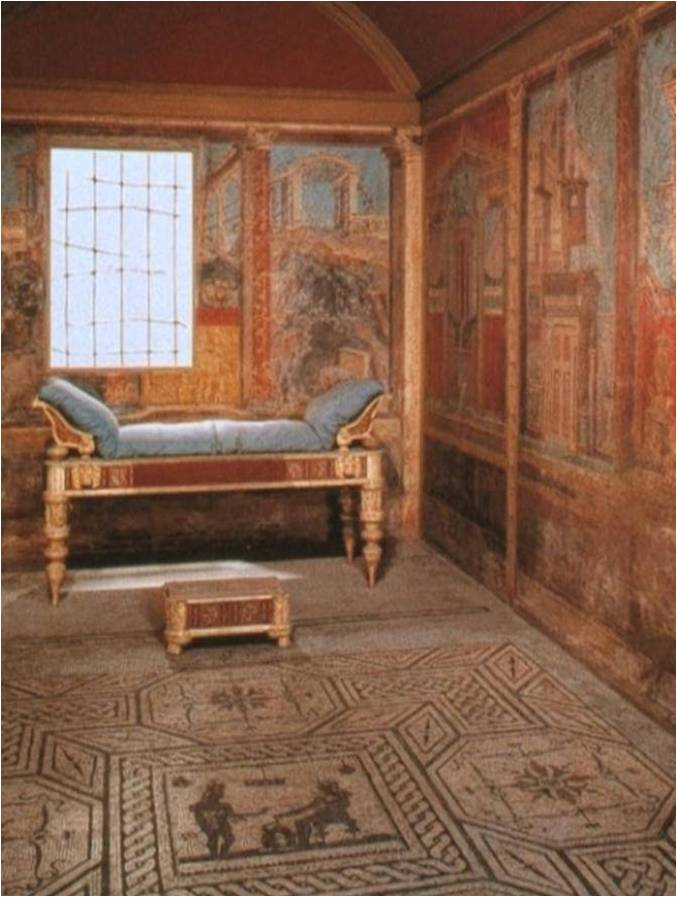
Cubiculum (bedroom) from the Villa of P. Fannius Synistor at Boscoreale, buried in the eruption of Mount Vesuvius in 79 AD, with reconstructed furniture, and an Egyptian style mosaic

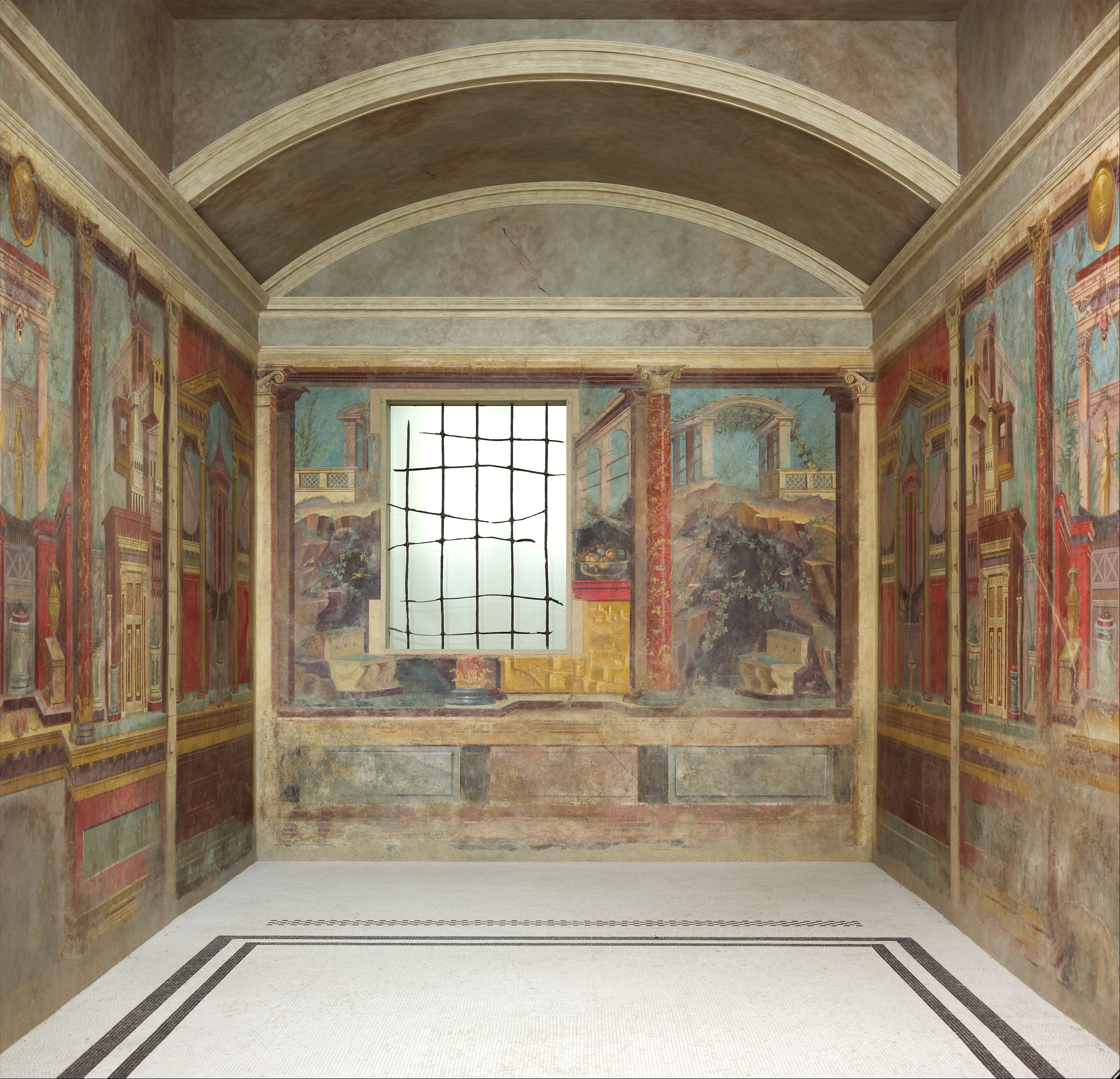
The bedroom without furniture, in the Metropolitan Museum of Art

A cubiculum (pl.: cubicula) was a private room in a domus, an ancient Roman house occupied by a high-status family. It usually led directly from the atrium, but in later periods it was sometimes adjacent to the peristyle. It was used for the functions of a modern bedroom, sleep and sex, as well as for business meetings, the reception of important guests and the display of the most highly prized works of art in the house. The cubiculum was used for quiet or secret meetings and could have been used as a library. It was also a preferred venue for murder and suicide. A room used only for sleeping was not classed as a cubiculum.

The private nature of the cubiculum made it a place for contemplation and religious observance, especially when illicit. According to the Actus Silvestri, Constantine the Great first learned of Christianity in his cubiculum and fasted there for a week before his first confession and baptism.
