= El Jaleo =

1882 painting by John Singer Sargent

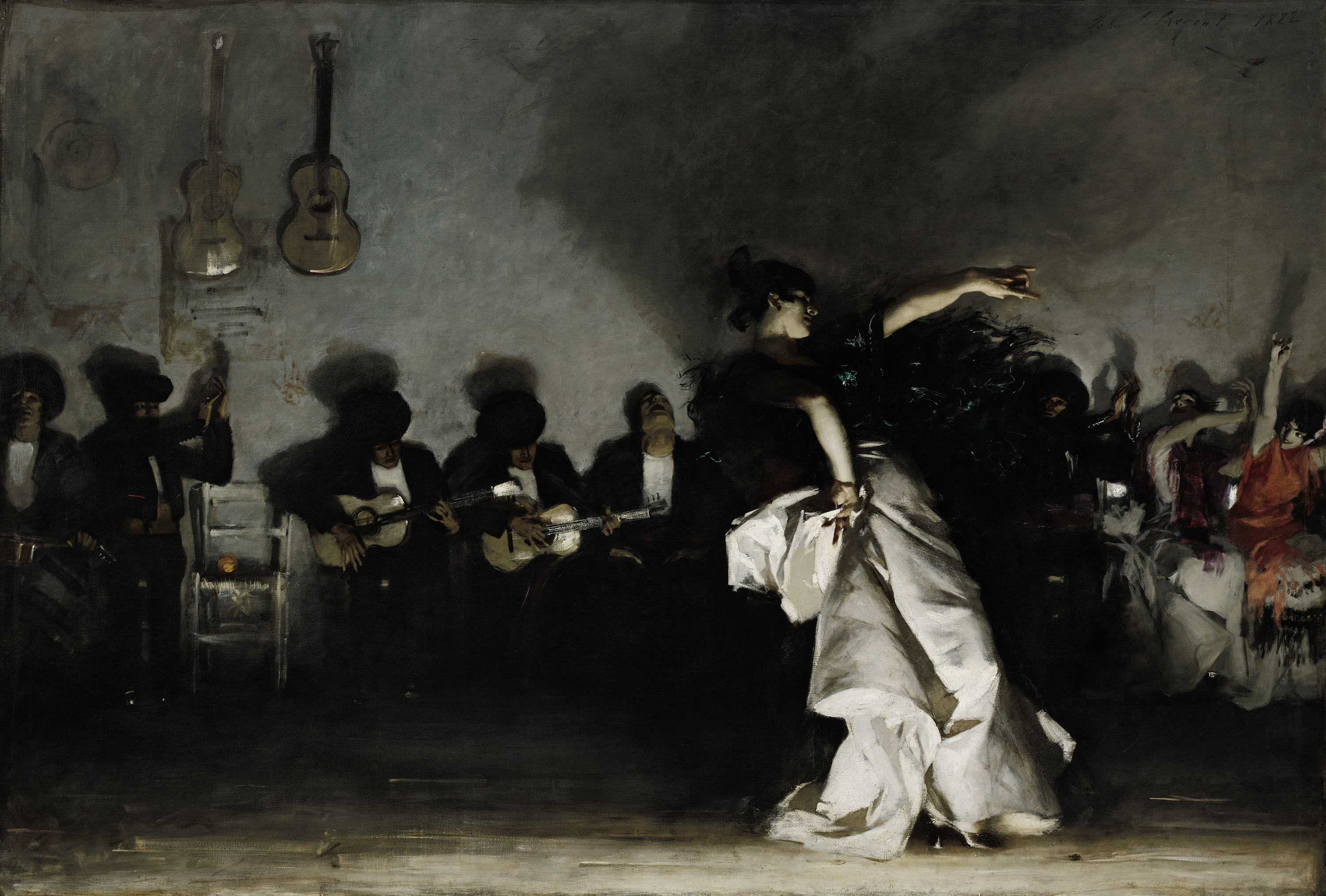
- Artist: John Singer Sargent
- Year: 1882
- Medium: Oil on canvas
- Dimensions: 237 cm × 352 cm (93 in × 138 in)
- Location: Isabella Stewart Gardner Museum, Boston

El Jaleo is a large painting by John Singer Sargent, depicting a Spanish Romani dancer performing to the accompaniment of musicians. Painted in 1882, it currently hangs in the Isabella Stewart Gardner Museum, in Boston, Massachusetts.

== Background ==
The painting was inspired by a five-month trip Sargent made through Spain and North Africa in 1879, which also yielded a smaller oil painting, The Spanish Dance (Hispanic Society of America). Chronologically and thematically the painting is related to a series of works Sargent painted during a subsequent stay in Venice. These too include dramatic light effects, exotic models and restrained coloring. Impressed by the costumes and theatrical manner of Romani dance, the painter returned to Paris and began work on a large canvas whose scale suggested a performing stage. The name El Jaleo refers to both the broad meaning of jaleo, a ruckus, as well as the specific dance known as jaleo de jerez.

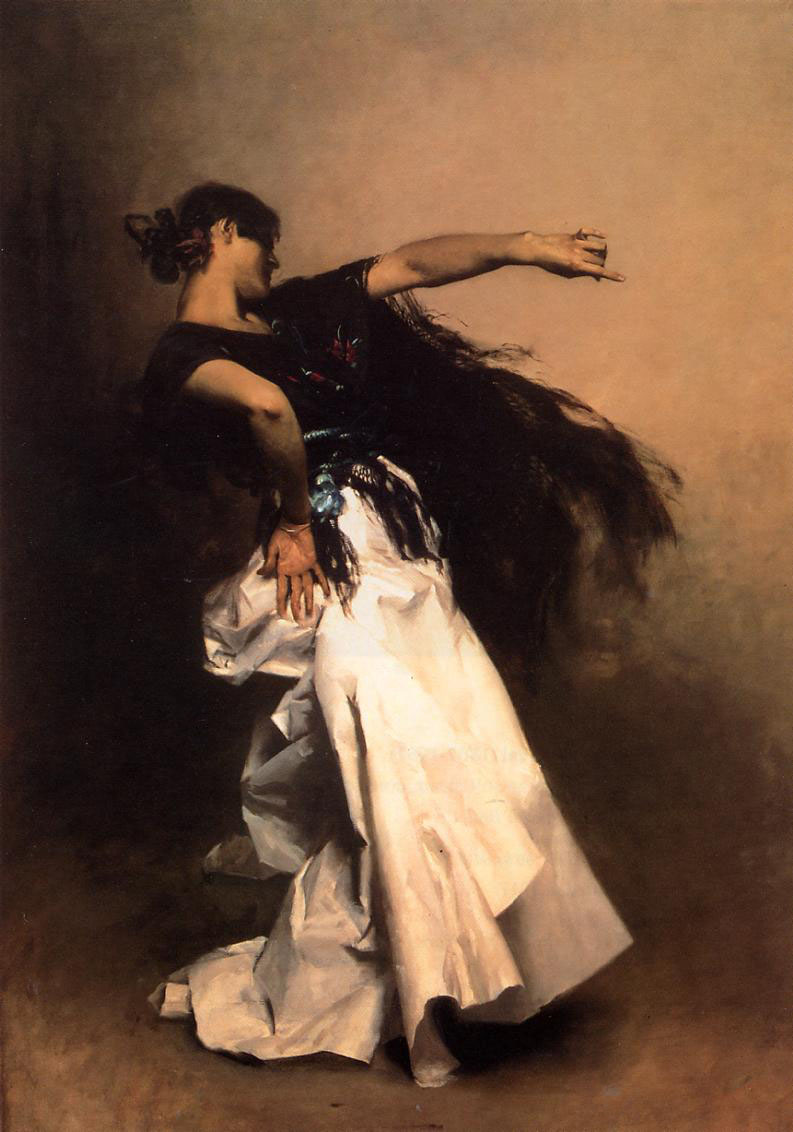
Spanish Dancer, 1879-1882. A preparatory oil study for the main figure in El Jaleo. Private collection.

Sargent planned the composition of El Jaleo for at least a year. The painting was preceded by a series of preliminary studies, focusing particularly on the dancer's stylized posture. The result of thorough preparation, El Jaleo is characterized by an assured and rapid handling, and may have been completed in no more than a few days.

== Description ==
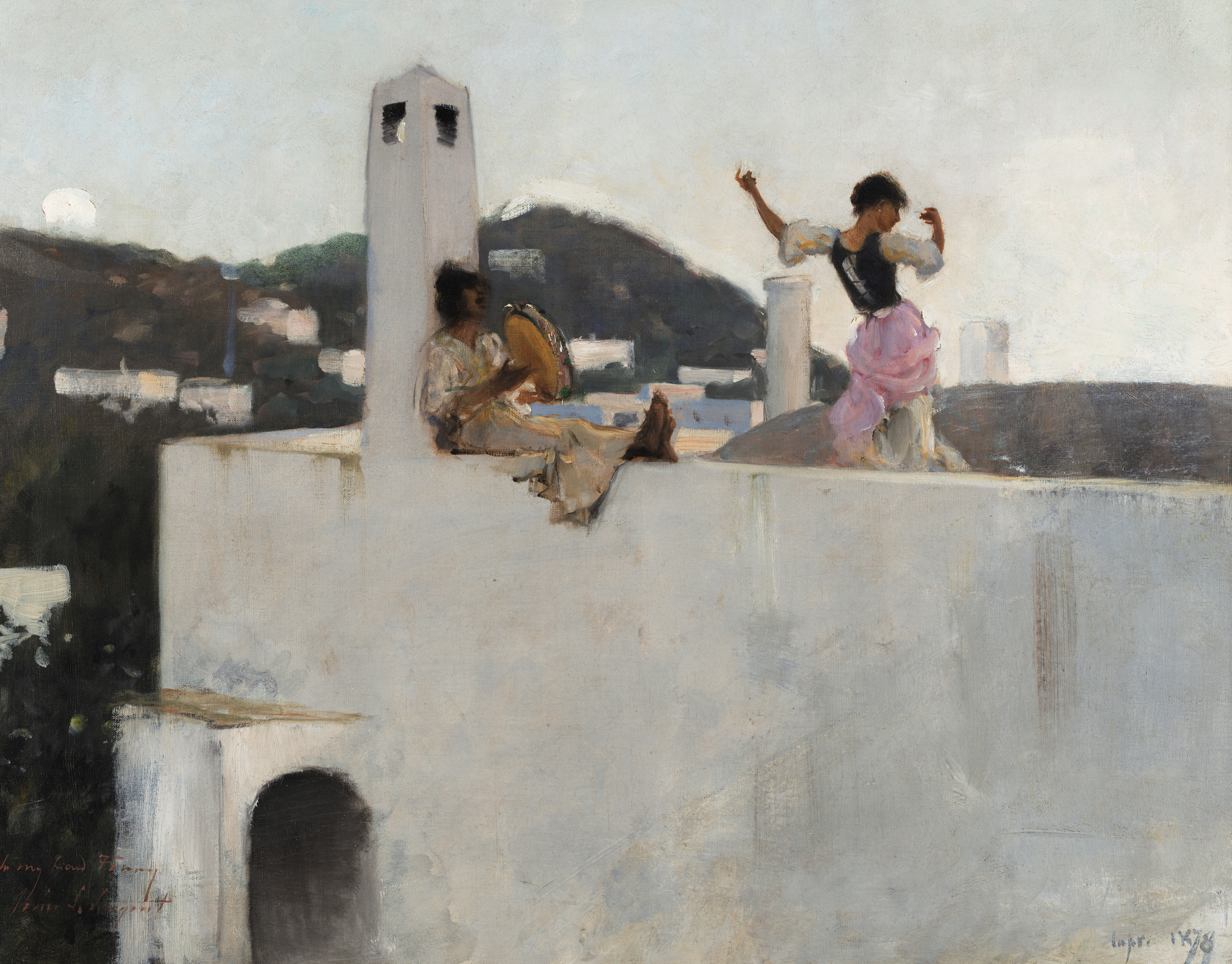
Sargent's painting Capri (1878) depicts Rosina Ferrara dancing the tarantella, and anticipates the flamenco of El Jaleo. Crystal Bridges Museum of American Art.

Almost 12 feet (3.7 m) wide, El Jaleo is broadly painted in a nearly monochromatic palette, but for spots of red at the right and an orange at left, which is reminiscent of the lemons Édouard Manet inserted into several of his large paintings. At odds with the academic practice of carefully modulated tones, Sargent dramatized the contrast between rich blacks and the shining white skirt of the dancer, caught in the strong footlights and painted briskly so as to suggest movement. The lighting also creates long and eerie shadows on the rear wall that comprises nearly half the painting.

The female dancer, leaning asymmetrically, is placed to imply forward motion, from left to right across the canvas. She is wearing a large, embroidered shawl wrapped around her shoulders, illustrating common flamenco costuming. The dancer's pose, with the outstretched left arm, is a depiction of standard flamenco dance technique and style.

El Jaleo is the most theatrical of Sargent's early major works. The lack of a barrier between the viewer and dancer helps create the illusion that we are present at the actual event; the manipulation of space and lighting communicates the energetic rhythms of the dance, its sound and movement.

El Jaleo is an example of Hispanism, the phenomenon of widespread fascination with Spanish culture throughout Europe and America in the nineteenth and early twentieth century.

The painting has been called both an example of John Singer Sargent's Impressionism and also his early affinity with the Realist movement.

A brief shot in the 1960 movie The Alamo re-creates the scene portrayed in El Jaleo, in fulfillment of a promise to do so that actor John Wayne, who directed it, had given movie executive Spyros Skouras.

== Provenance ==
Sargent exhibited El Jaleo at the 1882 Paris Salon, where the painting was purchased by a Boston patron, Thomas Jefferson Coolidge. It was the last subject picture that Sargent exhibited at the Salon, and his greatest success there.

In 1888 the painting was publicly exhibited in Boston, at which time museum patron Isabella Stewart Gardner, the heiress wife of a Coolidge cousin, expressed her interest in it. In 1914 she borrowed El Jaleo to exhibit in her museum, and constructed the Spanish Cloister gallery especially for El Jaleo, which is framed by a Moorish arch and reflected the painting in a large mirror running perpendicular to its left edge. Coolidge then gave the painting to Gardner, and Sargent presented her with an album of pencil drawings he had made as preparatory sketches for the work.

El Jaleo was on exhibition at the National Gallery of Art in Washington D.C. for a short time in 1992, on loan from the Isabella Stewart Gardner Museum for the first time since 1914. At that time, the painting had been recently cleaned and restored by Alain Goldrach.

== Critical reception ==
After the initial exhibition of El Jaleo in 1882 at the French Salon, John Singer Sargent became, as one writer put it, "the most talked-about painter in Paris." Some critics in 1882 said that the painting caused Sargent to join the ranks of the French Impressionists. A critic for Le Figaro called the painting "one of the most original and strongest works of the present Salon." Some writers hailed the painting as clever, while others dismissed it as a vagary of the artist.

== See also ==
- List of works by John Singer Sargent
