= Isabella Stewart Gardner =

American patron of the arts (1840–1924)

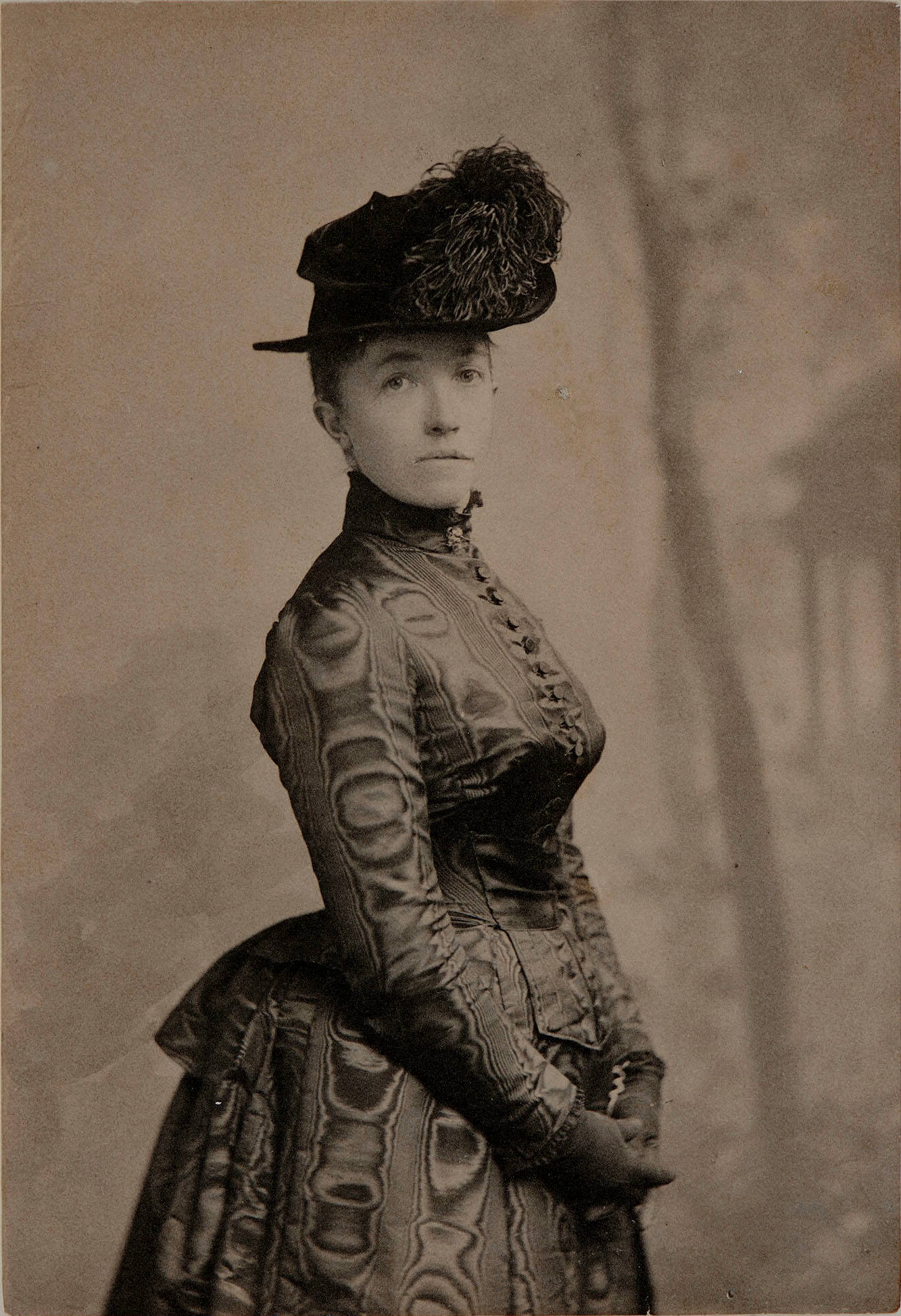
- Gardner in 1888
- Born: Isabella Stewart; April 14, 1840; New York City, U.S.
- Died: July 17, 1924 (aged 84); Boston, Massachusetts, U.S.
- Occupation: Philanthropist
- Known for: Founder of Isabella Stewart Gardner Museum
- Spouse: John Lowell Gardner
- Relatives: Isabella Gardner (grand-niece)

Isabella Stewart Gardner (née Stewart; April 14, 1840 – July 17, 1924) was an American art collector, philanthropist, and patron of the arts. She founded the Isabella Stewart Gardner Museum in Boston.

Gardner was noted for her intellectual curiosity and love of travel. She was a friend of noted artists and writers of the day, including John Singer Sargent, James McNeill Whistler, Dennis Miller Bunker, Anders Zorn, Henry James, Dodge MacKnight, Okakura Kakuzō and Francis Marion Crawford.

Gardner created much fodder for the gossip columns of the day, with her reputation for stylish tastes and unconventional behavior. The Boston society pages called her by many names, including "Belle," "Donna Isabella," "Isabella of Boston," and "Mrs. Jack". Her surprising appearance at a 1912 concert (at what was, then, a very formal Boston Symphony Orchestra) wearing a white headband emblazoned with "Oh, you Red Sox" was reported, at the time, to have "almost caused a panic", and remains in Boston one of the most talked about of her eccentricities.

== Biography ==
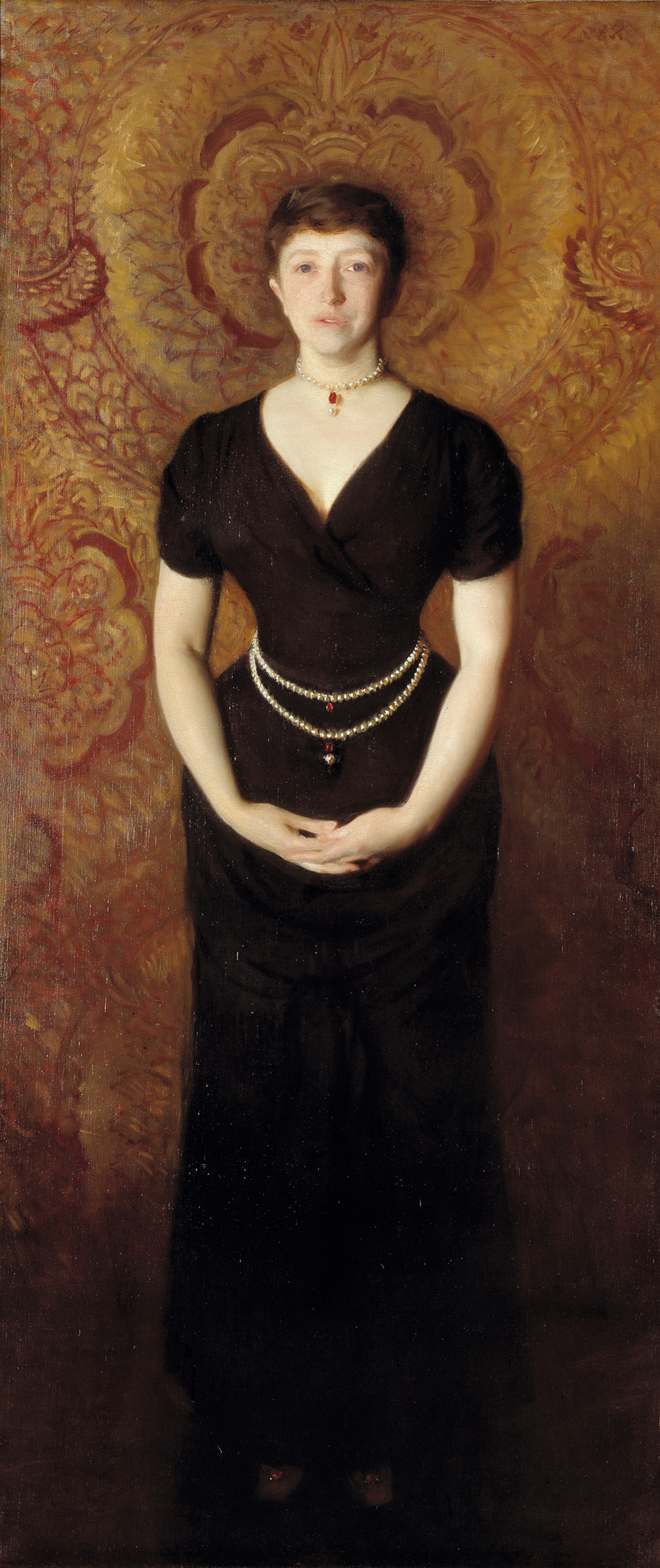
Isabella Stewart Gardner, 1888 painting by John Singer Sargent

Isabella Stewart was born in New York City on April 14, 1840, the daughter of wealthy linen-merchant David Stewart and Adelia Stewart (née Smith). She grew up in Manhattan. From age five to fifteen, she attended a nearby academy for girls, where she studied art, music, and dance, as well as French and Italian. Attendance at Grace Church exposed her to religious art, music, and ritual. At age 16, she and her family moved to Paris, France, where she was enrolled in a school for American girls. Her classmates included members of the wealthy Gardner family of Boston. In 1857, she was taken to Italy, and in Milan, she saw Gian Giacomo Poldi Pezzoli's collection of Renaissance art arranged in rooms designed to recall historical eras. She said, at the time, that if she were ever to inherit some money, she would have a similar house for people to visit and enjoy. She returned to New York, in 1858.

Shortly after returning, her former classmate, Julia Gardner, invited her to Boston, where she met Julia's brother, John Lowell "Jack" Gardner. Three years her senior, he was the son of John L. and Catharine E. (Peabody) Gardner, and one of Boston's most eligible bachelors. They married in Grace Church on April 10, 1860, and then lived in a house that Isabella's father gave them, at 152 Beacon Street in Boston. They resided there for the rest of Jack's life.

Jack and Isabella had one son, born on June 18, 1863. He died from pneumonia on March 15, 1865, however. A year later, Isabella suffered a miscarriage and was told she could not bear any more children. Her close friend and sister-in-law died about the same time. Gardner became extremely depressed and withdrew from society. On the advice of doctors, she and Jack traveled to Europe, in 1867. Isabella was so ill that she had to be taken aboard the ship on a stretcher. The couple spent almost a year traveling, visiting Scandinavia and Russia but spending most of their time in Paris. The trip had the desired effect on Isabella's health and became a turning point in her life. It was on this trip that she began her lifelong habit of keeping scrapbooks of her travels. Upon her return, she began to establish her reputation as a fashionable, high-spirited socialite.

In 1875, Jack's brother, Joseph P. Gardner, died, leaving three young sons: Joseph Jr., William Amory, and Augustus. Jack and Isabella "adopted" and raised the boys. Isabella's biographer, Morris Carter, wrote that "in her duty to these boys, she was faithful and conscientious".

== Travel and collecting ==
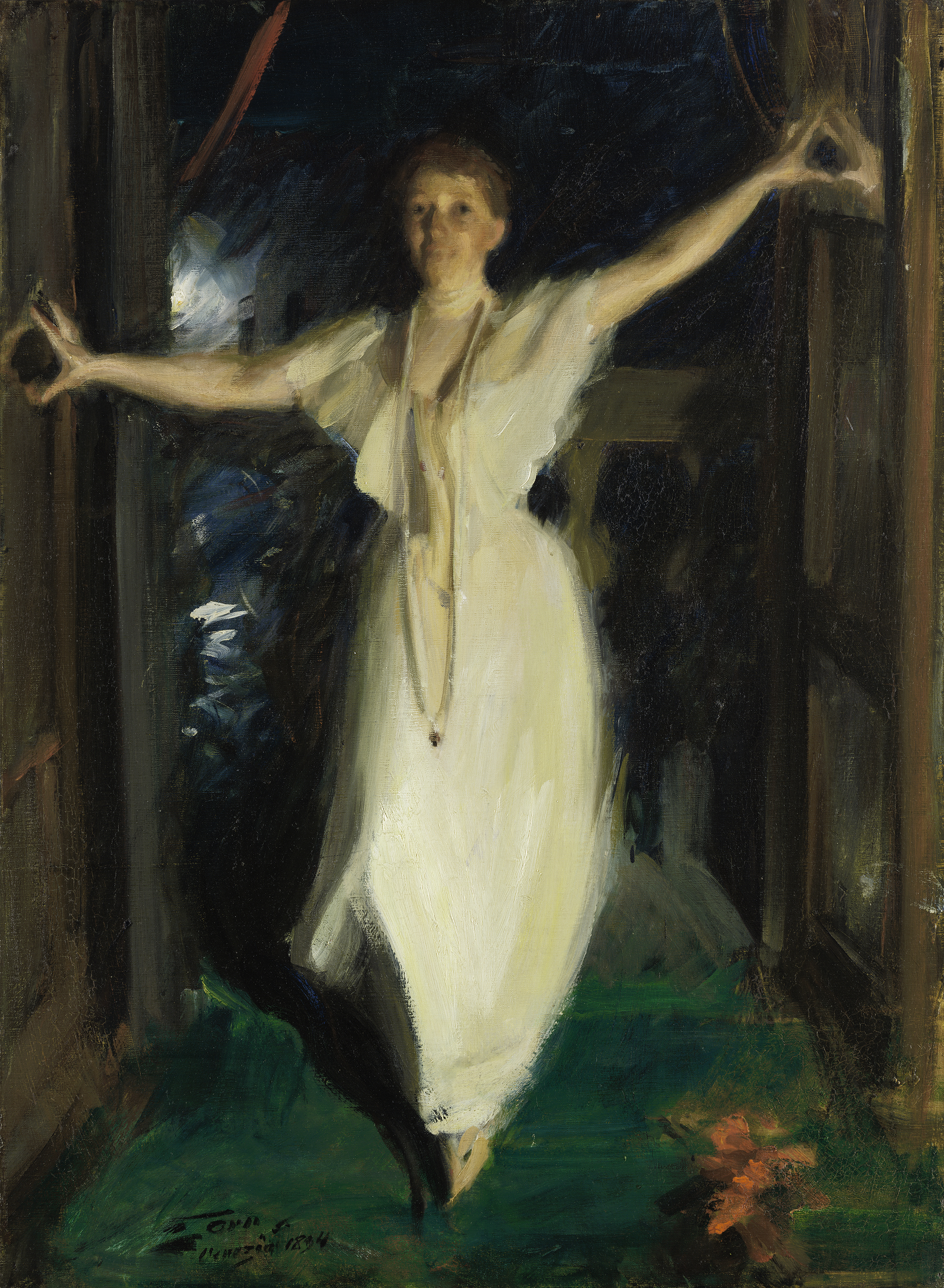
Isabella Stewart Gardner in Venice (1894), by Anders Zorn (Gardner Museum)

In 1874, Isabella and Jack Gardner visited the Middle East, Central Europe, and Paris. Beginning in the late 1880s, they frequently traveled across America, Europe, and Asia to discover foreign cultures and expand their knowledge of art around the world. Jack and Isabella would take more than a dozen trips abroad over the years, keeping them out of the country for a total of ten years.

The earliest works in the Gardners' collection were accumulated during their trips to Europe, especially. In 1891, she started to focus on European fine art, after inheriting $1.75 million from her father. One of her first acquisitions was The Concert by Vermeer (c. 1664), purchased at a Paris auction house in 1892. She also collected from other places abroad, such as Egypt, Turkey, and the Far East. The Gardners began to collect, in earnest, in the late 1890s, rapidly building a world-class collection, primarily of paintings and sculpture, but also tapestries, photographs, silver, ceramics and manuscripts, and architectural elements, such as doors, stained glass, and mantelpieces.

In the early years of the 20th century, Isabella traveled with friend and Boston architect, Edmund March Wheelwright, to collect for the Harvard Lampoon Building, also called "Lampoon Castle," a faux Flemish castle in Harvard Square. Isabella donated many pieces of art to the castle, over her years of collecting. The value of this collection is uncertain, due to the secret nature of the Lampoon.

Nearly seventy works of art in her collection were acquired, with the help of connoisseur Bernard Berenson. Among the collectors with whom she competed was Edward Perry Warren, who supplied a number of works to the Museum of Fine Arts, Boston. The Gardner collection includes works by some of Europe's most important artists, such as Botticelli's Madonna and Child with an Angel, Titian's Rape of Europa, Fra Angelico's Dormition and Assumption of the Virgin, and Diego Velázquez's King Philip IV of Spain. She purchased some of her collection on her own, but often asked for male colleagues, such as her business partner, to purchase on her behalf, as it was uncommon for women to participate in art collecting.

Stewart Gardner's favorite foreign destination was Venice, Italy. The Gardners regularly stayed at the Palazzo Barbaro, a major artistic center for a circle of American and English expatriates in Venice, and visited Venice's artistic treasures with amateur artist and former Bostonian Ralph Curtis. While in Venice, Gardner bought art and antiques, attended the opera, and dined with expatriate artists and writers.

== Museum creation ==
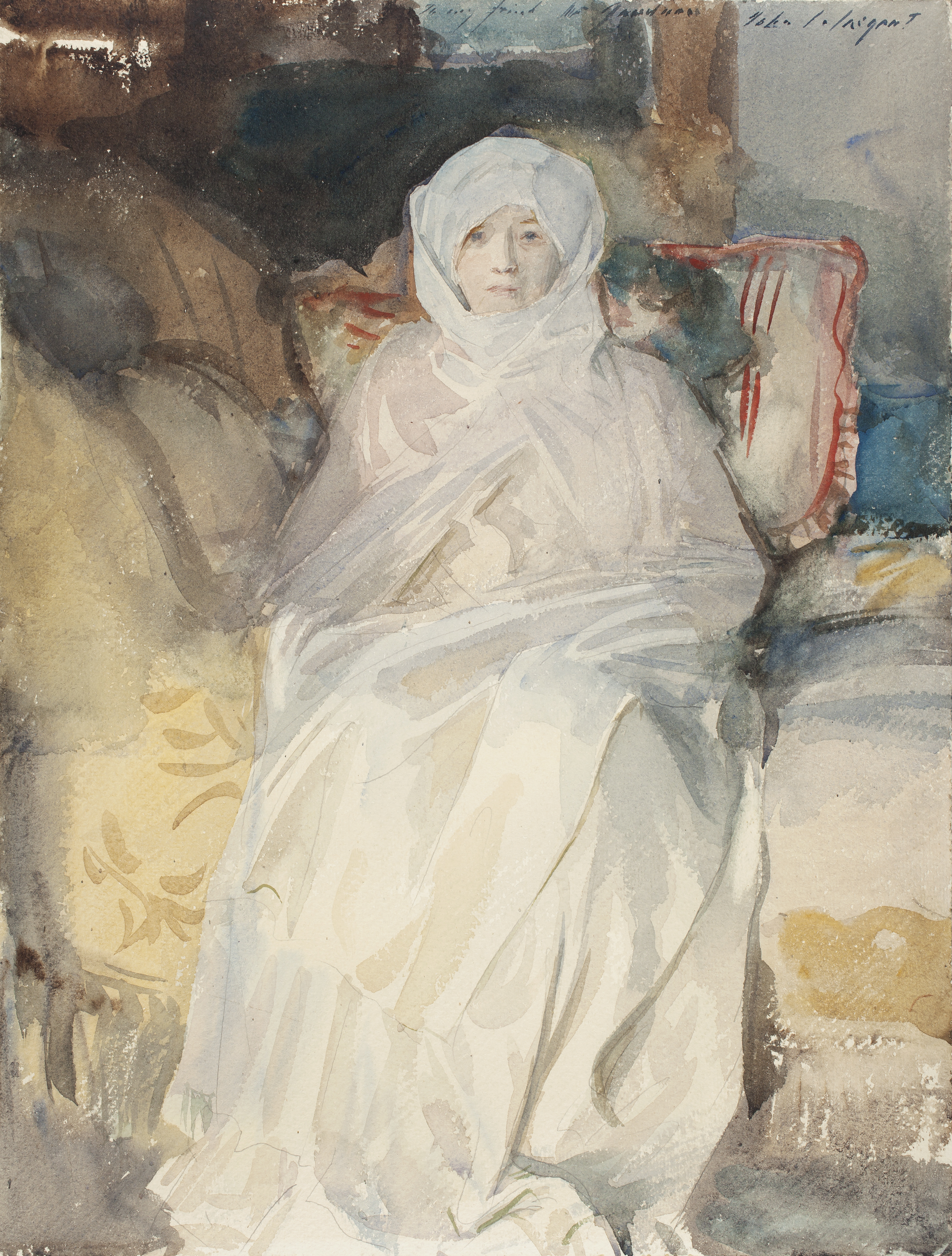
Mrs. Gardner in White (1922), by Sargent

By 1896, Isabella and Jack Gardner recognized that their house on Beacon Street in Boston's Back Bay, although enlarged once, was not sufficient to house their growing collection of art, including works by Botticelli, Vermeer, and Rembrandt. After Jack's sudden death in 1898, Isabella realized their shared dream of building a museum for their treasures. She purchased land for the museum in the marshy Fenway area of Boston and hired architect Willard T. Sears to build a museum modeled on the Renaissance palaces of Venice. Gardner was deeply involved in every aspect of the design, though, leading Sears to quip that he was merely the structural engineer making Gardner's design possible. The building completely surrounds a glass-covered garden courtyard, the first of its kind in America. Gardner intended the second and third floors to be galleries. A large music room originally spanned the first and second floors on one side of the building, but Gardner later split the room, to make space to display a large John Singer Sargent painting called El Jaleo on the first floor and tapestries on the second floor.

After the building was ready, Gardner spent a year carefully installing her collection, according to her personal aesthetic. The eclectic gallery installations, paintings, sculpture, textiles, and furniture from different periods and cultures combine to create a rich, complex, and unique narrative. In the Titian Room, Titian's masterpiece The Rape of Europa (1561–1562) hangs above a piece of pale green silk, which had been cut from one of Stewart Gardner's gowns designed by Charles Frederick Worth. Throughout the collection, similar stories, intimate portrayals, and discoveries abound.

The museum privately opened on January 1, 1903, with a grand opening celebration featuring a performance by members of the Boston Symphony Orchestra and a menu that included champagne and doughnuts. It opened to the public, months later, with a variety of paintings, drawings, furniture and other objects dating from ancient Egypt to Matisse. The museum is still arranged with a variety of textiles, furniture, and paintings, floor to ceiling.

== Illness and death ==
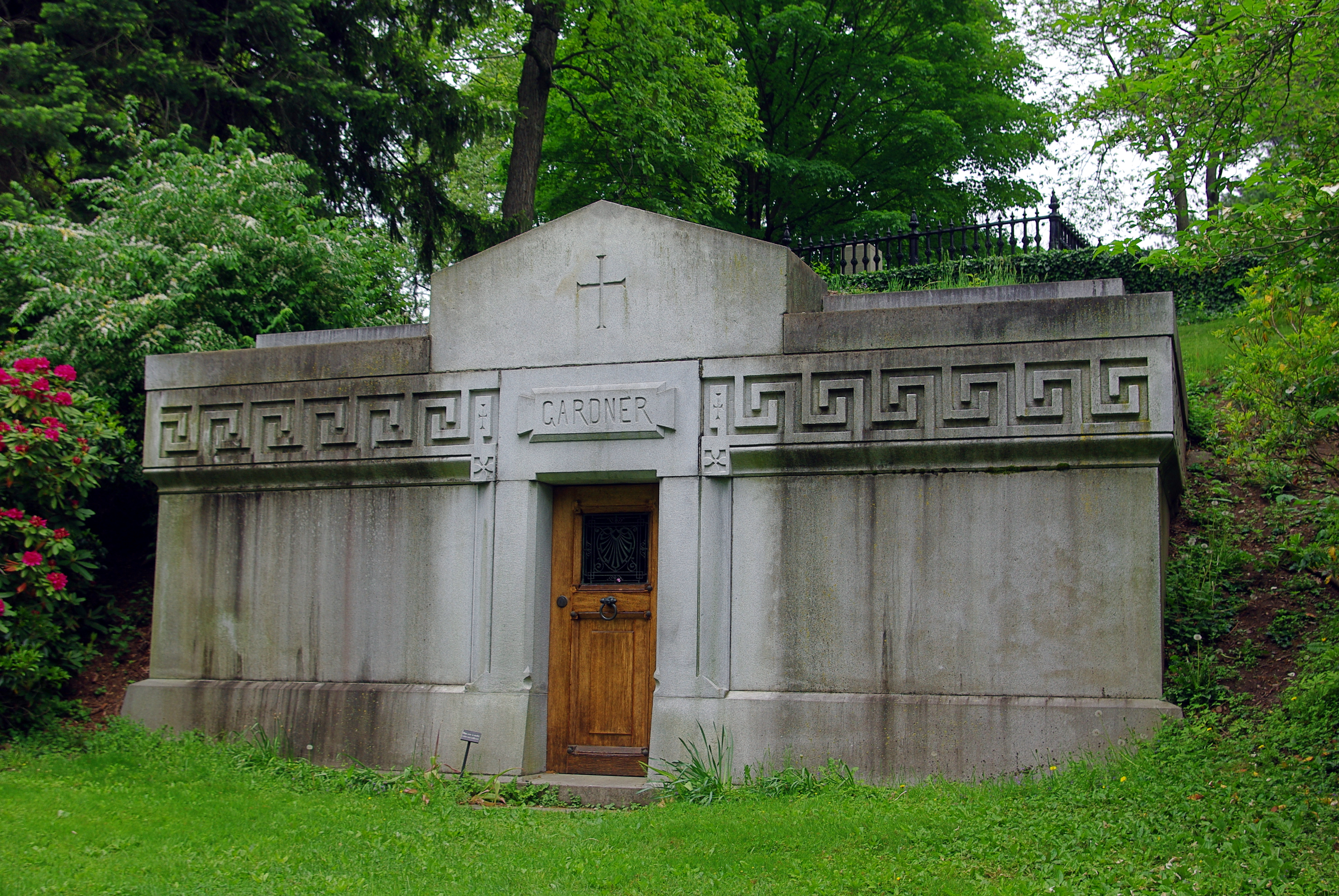
Gardner family tomb, Mount Auburn Cemetery

In 1919, Isabella Gardner suffered the first of a series of strokes. She died on July 17, 1924, at the age of 84 in her living quarters on the fourth floor of her Museum. She is buried in the Gardner family tomb at Mount Auburn Cemetery in Watertown and Cambridge, between her husband and her son.

== Legacy ==
While alive, Gardner would use the fourth floor of her museum for her residence. After her death it served as residence for the museum's director for over sixty years. When Anne Hawley became director, she decided not to live there. Six months after Hawley took office, the museum was robbed. More recently, the floor has been converted for use as museum offices.

Her will created an endowment of $1 million and outlined stipulations for support of the museum, including that the permanent collection not be significantly altered. In keeping with her philanthropic nature, her will also left sizable bequests to the Massachusetts Society for the Prevention of Cruelty to Children, Industrial School for Crippled and Deformed Children, Animal Rescue League of Boston, and Massachusetts Society for the Prevention of Cruelty to Animals.

A devout Anglo-Catholic, she requested, in her will, that the Society of St John the Evangelist (Cowley Fathers) celebrate an annual Memorial Requiem Mass for the repose of her soul in the museum chapel. This duty is now performed each year on her birthday.

Stewart Gardner was an intimate patroness of many artists, writers, and musicians. An accomplished traveler and shrewd collector, she was a leading figure in American social and cultural life. In Boston they called her the "Queen of the Back Bay". The site of her former home, which was demolished in 1904, is a stop on the Boston Women's Heritage Trail. She is the namesake of Gardner Mountain and Isabella Ridge in Washington state.
