= Bobby Donati =

American gangster (1940–1991)

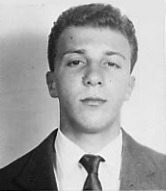
- An undated booking photo of Donati from early in his life
- Born: June 4, 1940; Boston, Massachusetts, U.S.
- Disappeared: September 21, 1991 (aged 51); Revere, Massachusetts
- Cause of death: Homicide by beating and stabbing
- Body discovered: September 24, 1991
- Other name: Bobby D
- Years active: 1958–1991
- Known for: Possible involvement in the Isabella Stewart Gardner Museum theft
- Relatives: Richard Donati
- Allegiance: Patriarca crime family

Robert Donati (June 4, 1940 – c. September 21, 1991), who went by the name of Bobby and was also known by the nickname Bobby D – was an American career criminal. Along with his twin brother Richard, he was associated with the New England-based Patriarca crime family. His criminal history dates to 1958, when he was 17. He and his brothers were long believed to be part of the Angiulo Brothers' crew, with whom they carried out burglaries.

On September 24, 1991 – three days after he had last been seen alive leaving his house in the Boston suburb of Revere – his bound, beaten, and stabbed body was found in the trunk of his Cadillac, a short distance away. The killing remains unsolved.

Donati's death has long been attributed to the struggle between two factions for control of the Patriarca family at that time, after Raymond Patriarca, Jr. proved unable to unite the family following his father's death. Donati was reportedly a government informant, although federal prosecutors have denied it.

In recent years, however, Donati has been identified as possibly being involved in the 1990 theft of art worth $500 million from Boston's Isabella Stewart Gardner Museum, the largest art theft ever. Some accounts link his death to that crime instead. It has been reported that Donati stole the art in an attempt to get his boss Vincent M. Ferrara released from jail in order to ensure Ferrara would not be killed by the rival faction, which was gaining control of the Patriarca family at that time. The Federal Bureau of Investigation (FBI), which had Donati under heavy surveillance at the time of his death, has not publicly identified him as a suspect in the art theft, which it is still investigating.

== Life and career ==
=== 1950s–60s ===
Bobby and Richard Donati were born on June 4, 1940, in East Boston, to immigrants from Milan, Italy. The neighborhood, predominantly Italian-American at the time, was home to many Italian-American Mafia members and street criminals. Both Donatis, known colloquially as Bobby and Dicky D, joined their ranks early; Bobby's first arrest dates to 1958.

By 1965 the brothers were already involved in the Boston mob, working for the Angiulo Brothers' crew, part of the Providence-based Patriarca crime family, mainly pulling robberies and burglaries from a base in the city's North End. That year he was convicted and sentenced to prison for his role in the armed robbery of cash and furs from a Boylston Street furrier. Later, during the 1970s, Joseph Barboza recognized the brothers' prominence in the Boston mob by using their name as his alias after he moved to San Francisco, where he was killed in 1974. In 1981, the Massachusetts State Police described him as "a well-known organized crime figure".

=== 1970s–80s ===
In the early 1970s, Donati became friends with Myles Connor Jr., a former rock musician and son of a Milton police officer who had turned to art theft as a career. Donati, who had begun to search through local antique stores in search of quality furniture and decor for his house, began planning jobs with Connor. In 1974, the two broke into the Woolworth Estate in Monmouth, Maine, and stole five paintings by Andrew and N.C. Wyeth. They were caught when an acquaintance Donati had made who said he would help them sell the stolen works turned out to be an undercover FBI agent. While Connor was out on bail, he arranged for the theft of a Rembrandt from the Boston Museum of Fine Arts in which he later claimed Donati had taken part; in exchange for its return he received a reduced sentence. Donati, by then serving a sentence in state prison and unsuccessful in his efforts to persuade a federal judge to reduce his sentence for securities theft, took note.

After both had finished their sentences, they continued planning art thefts. The two frequently visited the Isabella Stewart Gardner Museum, as they had done since the early 1970s, noting how weak the security was given the expensive artworks within it. They identified specific works they believed could sell well if stolen; Donati was particularly interested in one of the lesser items in the museum's collection, a Napoleonic Era finial, while Connor had his eye on Titian's The Rape of Europa; he also tried to interest Donati in a bronze Shang dynasty gu. Connor and Donati went as far as to climb nearby trees and time the guards' movements through the various galleries during the night hours when the museum was closed. They agreed the most effective way to enter was to pose as police officers, which they had done on some other jobs.

In the 1980s, Donati's stature within the Patriarca family increased as a result of leadership changes. Family boss Raymond L.S. Patriarca died in 1984; that same year the Angiulos, Donati's longtime bosses, were arrested on federal racketeering charges which led to their convictions two years later. Vincent "The Animal" Ferrara, one of several higher-level mobsters vying for control as Patriarca's son struggled to maintain his father's control over the family, took over the Angiulos' operations in Boston's North End. He chose Donati to be his driver.

==== Boston mob war ====
The Patriarca situation worsened as the decade drew to a close. Without his father's close Boston allies the Angiulos, the younger Raymond Patriarca was unable to unify the family behind him. In Boston itself, Whitey Bulger, leader of the Winter Hill Gang, began brutally asserting his own authority over criminal enterprise from his base in South Boston, playing off his putative allies on both sides of the Patriarcas by informing on them to the FBI until the Boston Globe revealed the relationship in 1988.

In 1989, Frank Salemme, a close confidant of the elder Patriarca's, was released from prison. Ferrara and the other Boston members of the family feared he would attempt to effectively take over the leadership by becoming Raymond Jr.'s underboss. They attempted to have him killed outside a Saugus restaurant, but he survived some serious gunshot wounds. No one has ever faced charges over that attack, although Salemme knew who was responsible.

In the aftermath, Raymond Patriarca Jr. attempted once again to bring peace to the family by making one member from each side. However, the ceremony, held in Medford, turned into an embarrassment for the Patriarcas when it was later revealed that the FBI's bugs had recorded the initiation ritual, hitherto a secret that had only been revealed in parts through accounts by former members. The subsequent revelation forced Patriarca to step down, supposedly at the behest of Mafia families in other regions of the country, and escalated hostilities between the two factions.

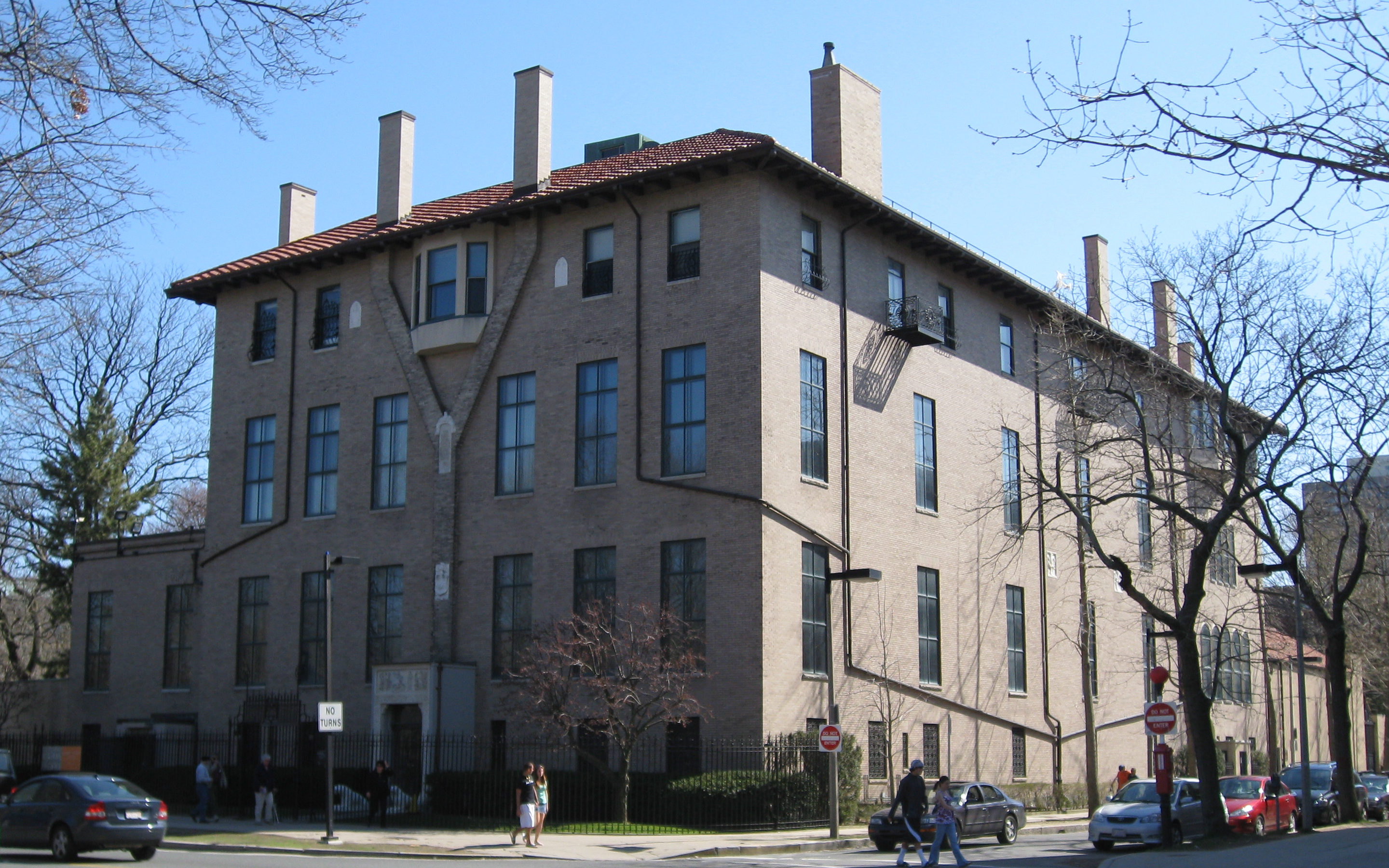
The Gardner museum, in 2008

Ferrara was indicted on racketeering and murder charges around the beginning of 1990 and arrested shortly afterwards. Shortly after 1 a.m. on March 18, thieves disguised as police officers convinced security guards at the Isabella Stewart Gardner Museum in Boston to let them in, whereupon they bound the two men up and spent the next several hours removing 13 works, including Storm on the Sea of Galilee, Rembrandt's only known seascape, as well as the finial that Donati had indicated an interest in. The stolen works have collectively been valued at $500 million, making it the highest-value art theft at the time.

Salemme took advantage of Ferrara's imprisonment to become the de facto leader of the Patriarca family. He still faced the challenge of Ferrara's crew and the other Argiulo loyalists in the North End. Both sides reportedly drew up lists of people they intended to kill, and began doing so. At one point the brother of one intended target was killed on the street while changing a flat tire. Many Patriarca operatives report that they were in constant fear for their lives during this period; one told Globe reporter Stephen Kurkjian in 2014 that after learning his name was on one of the lists and that two men had shown up at his sister's home looking for him, he moved to the far north of New England and began living under an assumed name.

== Death ==
Throughout 1991, friends and associates noted that Donati had become less outgoing and visibly anxious. He stayed home more often. In August he told one friend that he had noticed two men wearing black jogging outfits near the house he was renting on Mountain Avenue in Revere, apparently tracking his movements, and believed they were preparing to make an attempt on his life.

As he left his house on September 21, he was apparently abducted by a group of men. Three days later his body was found in the trunk of the Cadillac he had been driving, on Savage Street in Revere, a short distance from his home. He had been beaten over the head, stabbed over 20 times, and his throat had been cut.

=== Investigation and theories ===
No suspects have ever been officially named in the killing, although the files of a state assistant attorney general involved in organized-crime investigations at that time list David Turner, a member of the Patriarca faction loyal to Salemme who has also been suspected of involvement in the Gardner theft, as perhaps having committed the crime. It is believed by law enforcement that Donati was likely murdered by other mobsters loyal to Salemme, possibly in retaliation for involvement, actual or perceived, in the failed attempt on their boss's life two years earlier. Donati was the second of six mob figures killed during the early 1990s; many of the victims' bodies were found, as he was, in the trunks of their vehicles, a common Mafia practice to indicate the killing was related to the victim's criminal activities. William Youngworth, an antiques dealer and mob associate who in 1997 led a reporter to what may have been one of the stolen Gardner paintings, hidden in a Brooklyn warehouse, claimed at that time that Donati was on the verge of being made when he was killed, and killing a made man requires his boss's approval.

Other theories suggest Donati's death resulted more directly from specific crimes he was engaged in. Some reports suggest he was an occasional informant to authorities and thus was killed for that reason; In 1997, a federal prosecutor who had been threatened with contempt of court charges if he refused to say whether Donati was an informant told a judge that he had not been, at least not to any federal agencies. Donati's FBI files also note that he had some large gambling debts at the time.

There are also reports that suggest his death was directly linked to the Gardner theft. Writer Ulrich Boser wrote in his 2009 book The Gardner Heist that it was "widely rumored" that at the time of his death Donati was preparing to tell police what he knew about it. In Kurkjian's 2015 book Master Thieves, he writes that Donati's sister Lorraine believes the brutality of her brother's killing suggests it was motivated by more than being on the wrong side in a gang war. "One bullet could have accomplished what they were looking to do," she told him. "No one has to be beaten and stabbed like that unless there was some dark secret behind it."

== Possible role in Gardner Museum theft ==
From the day of the Gardner Museum theft, Donati was believed to have had a role in it, possibly as one of the two thieves who, wearing what appeared to be police uniforms, took the guards captive and stole the works. FBI agents went to see Connor, then in jail in Chicago awaiting trial on another theft, the next day to find out if he had orchestrated it from prison. He had not, but recalled that he and Donati had long cased the museum and considered plans for a theft. In 1997, Connor told Vanity Fair that he believed Donati had taken the gu, the oldest work in the museum's collection, to present to him as a gift later.

He also told Kurkjian that shortly after the theft, he was visited at the Lompoc federal prison in California by David Houghton, another suspect in the case. Houghton told him that he and Donati had stolen the art to bargain for his release, as Houghton believed Connor had been wrongly sentenced for his role in a drug deal. Like Donati, Houghton did not live long after the Gardner theft, succumbing to heart disease in 1992.

In 1997, Boston Herald reporter Tom Mashberg was taken by a source, William Youngworth, an antiques dealer who had served as a fence for property stolen by Connor and Donati, among others, to a Brooklyn warehouse where he was allowed to see what he believed to be Storm on the Sea of Galilee; tests of paint chips he was allowed to take were only able to demonstrate that it dated from that era. It is the only possible sighting of any of the stolen works since the theft. Youngworth told Mashberg that Donati and Houghton had masterminded the theft, with Donati as one of the two fake police officers in the museum and Houghton driving the van the works were loaded into.

Other circumstantial evidence connects Donati to the theft. Boston mobsters of the time believed him to have been the most capable of pulling the burglary off with his experience. The least valuable of all the stolen items was the Napoleonic finial he had expressed interest in; it was taken after the thieves went to great lengths attempting to take the banner it was attached to, directly opposite a Michelangelo sketch which was much more valuable and easier to remove. The use of police uniforms as a ruse to gain entry was part of a plan he and Connor had come up with years earlier; shortly before the crime Donati was seen by an acquaintance at a Revere bar frequented by many mobsters holding a package which contained police uniforms.

At the time of his death, Kurkjian reported in Master Thieves, the FBI had Donati under continuous surveillance. The bureau's file on Donati, however, does not explain why. Kurkjian believes that could be either due to the likelihood he would be targeted by Salemme's loyalists for assassination, or that it may have come to suspect him in the Gardner theft. It did not search Donati's home after his death, however.

Initially, investigators believed, if Donati had planned the Gardner theft it was to settle a gambling debt owed by a former security guard at the museum, who told him how lax the security was. Kurkjian offered another explanation for why Donati robbed the museum: he felt unsafe on the streets as long as Ferrara remained in custody, and hoped to use the art to bargain for his freedom, as Connor had done to reduce his sentence by arranging for the return of the BMFA's Rembrandt 15 years earlier.

According to Kurkjian, while he was working on the book in 2014 he received a call from a number he did not recognize, so he called back and identified himself. The caller asked that Kurkjian not identify him in print and said he knew Ferrara, who had by then been released from prison but was declining interview requests. After Kurkjian explained to him the FBI's current theory of the case, that Turner had masterminded the crime, the caller told him that was all wrong and that Donati had stolen the paintings "to get Vinnie Ferrara out of jail", consistent with an earlier claim for the theft's motive in a 1994 letter to the museum that former director Anne Hawley considered to have been a genuine attempt to make a deal to return the paintings, since its writer had information about the thefts that was not public at the time.

Kurkjian's caller said Donati visited Ferrara at the federal lockup in Hartford, Connecticut, where he was being held, after his January 1990 arrest on racketeering charges. The two spoke quietly, using short and vague language, aware their conversations were likely being monitored. Donati told Ferrara he would get him out; Ferrara pleaded with him not to try anything. "No matter what you do, it's not going to get me out of here", he said. "They will for these; you'll see", Donati responded.

Three months later, according to the caller, Ferrara learned of the Gardner theft and immediately realized that was what Donati had been referring to. Donati went to visit him again shortly afterwards at Plymouth state prison, where he had been moved as he was also facing a state murder charge. "Was that you?" he asked his onetime driver. "I told you I would do it", Donati said. Ferrara counseled him not to attempt negotiations as the authorities would not be interested. "They want me locked up forever, now more than ever," he said.

Ferrara warned Donati that he was in deeper than he thought, and strongly suggested he get out of Boston for his own good. Donati reassured him that he could hold on. "Don't worry," his associate attempted to reassure him. "I've buried the stuff. Once this blows over, I'll find the right person to negotiate with." It is unknown if Donati ever made such overtures to anyone; he and Ferrara never spoke again.

The FBI, which continues to investigate the theft, has said it is no longer interested in identifying the thieves as the statute of limitations on the crime expired in 1996 and no one can be prosecuted for it (although those knowingly in possession of the stolen works could still be charged for that offense). However, it apparently does not put much credence in the theory that Donati was behind the crime. Kurkjian writes that he shared the details of his conversation with the FBI agent in charge of the investigation, but at a news conference a month later, the agent did not mention Donati at all and apparently seemed to still be embracing an earlier FBI theory of the crime.

== See also ==
- Crime in Massachusetts
- List of twins
- List of unsolved murders (1980–1999)
