= Tortoni =

Tortoni may refer to:

== Places ==
- Café Tortoni in Buenos Aires

== People ==
- Giuseppe Tortoni (1775–1864), Neapolitan ice cream maker and entrepreneur; namesake of the café
- Michael Tortoni, Italian jazz musician and founder of the Bennetts Lane Jazz Club

== Fictional characters ==
- Kayo Tortoni, fictional female athlete and popular character in sports cartoons in the 1920s and 1930s
- Tortoni ein Illusionist, Why Cry at Parting? (1929 film)
- Enrico Tortoni, Paganini (1934 film)
- Tortoni the Dancing Master, The Gay Parisian (1941 film)
- Mr. Enrico Tortoni, When in Rome (2002 film)

== Literary works ==
- Chez Tortoni, painting depicting a man in the café
- Tortoni Tremelo the Cursed Musician (1998), book by Tomi Ungerer
- Viejo Tortoni, song by Eladia Blázquez

== Other uses ==
- Biscuit Tortoni, an Italian frozen dessert made from eggs and heavy cream
- Cherry Tortoni, racing horse who competed in the Moonee Valley Vase in 2020
- Tortoni, one of two advertising names for the ballet Gaîté Parisienne on its opening night
- Tortoni, one of fourteen dogs owned by Joe Gatto
- The "Tortoni Effect", a cognitive phenomenon where expert waiters use an associative memory strategy to remember customers' orders by linking them to the specific location of each diner at the table. Named after the café Tortoni by Facundo Manes
