= Landscape with Obelisk =

Stolen and missing painting by Govert Flinck

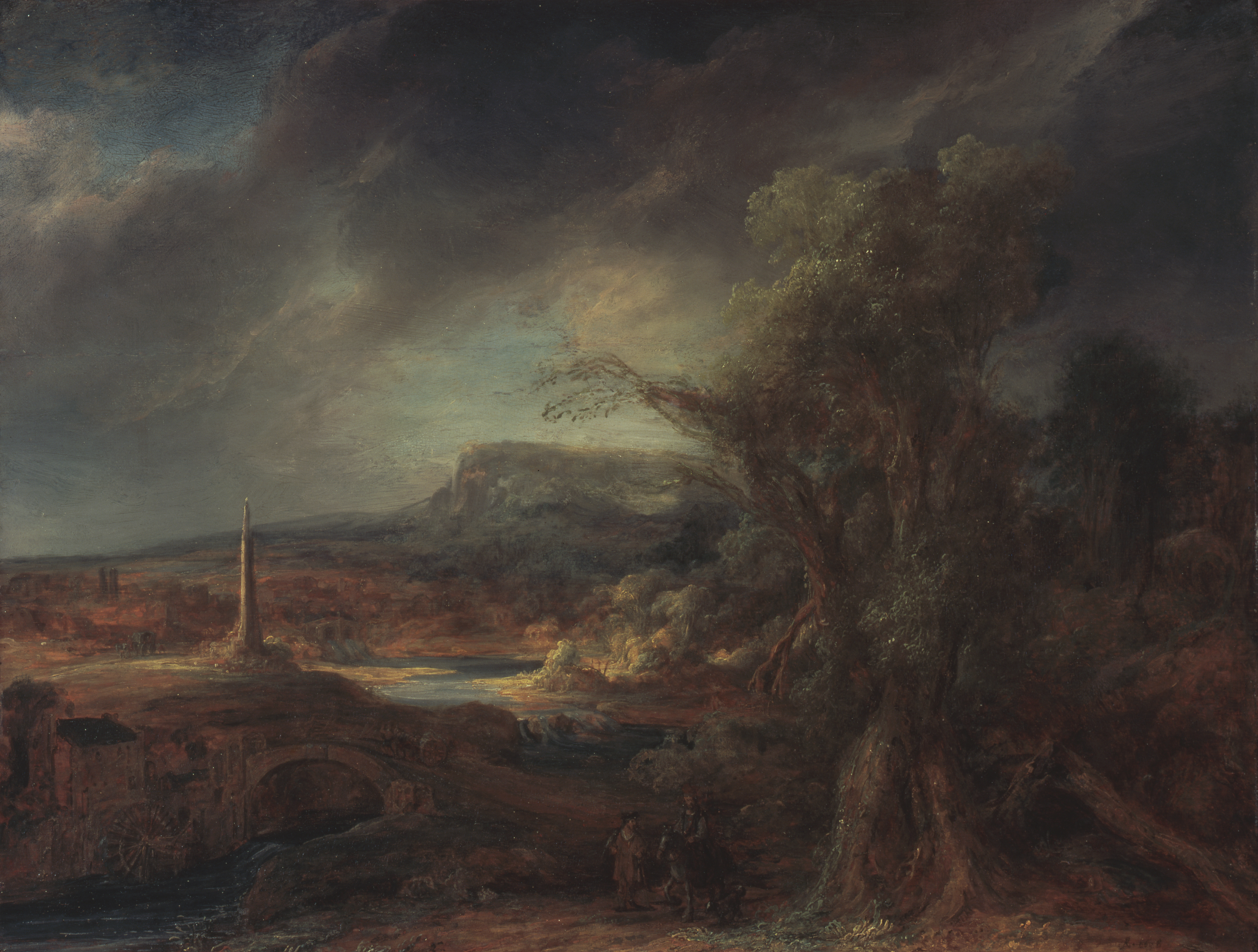
- Artist: Govert Flinck
- Year: 1638
- Type: Oil on wood
- Dimensions: 54.5 cm × 71 cm (21.5 in × 28 in)
- Location: Whereabouts unknown since the Isabella Stewart Gardner Museum theft in 1990

Landscape with Obelisk is a painting by Dutch artist Govert Flinck, painted in 1638. The oil-on-wood painting measures 54.5 by 71 centimetres (21.5 in × 28.0 in). It was formerly attributed to Rembrandt. The painting hung in the Isabella Stewart Gardner Museum of Boston, Massachusetts, United States, prior to being stolen in 1990.

== Provenance ==
The painting hung in the Isabella Stewart Gardner Museum of Boston, Massachusetts, prior to being stolen on March 18, 1990. The painting has not resurfaced. A $5 million reward, since doubled to $10 million, is offered for the return of the stolen items.

== See also ==
- Isabella Stewart Gardner Museum theft
- List of stolen paintings
