= A Lady and Gentleman in Black =

Stolen and missing 1633 painting by Rembrandt

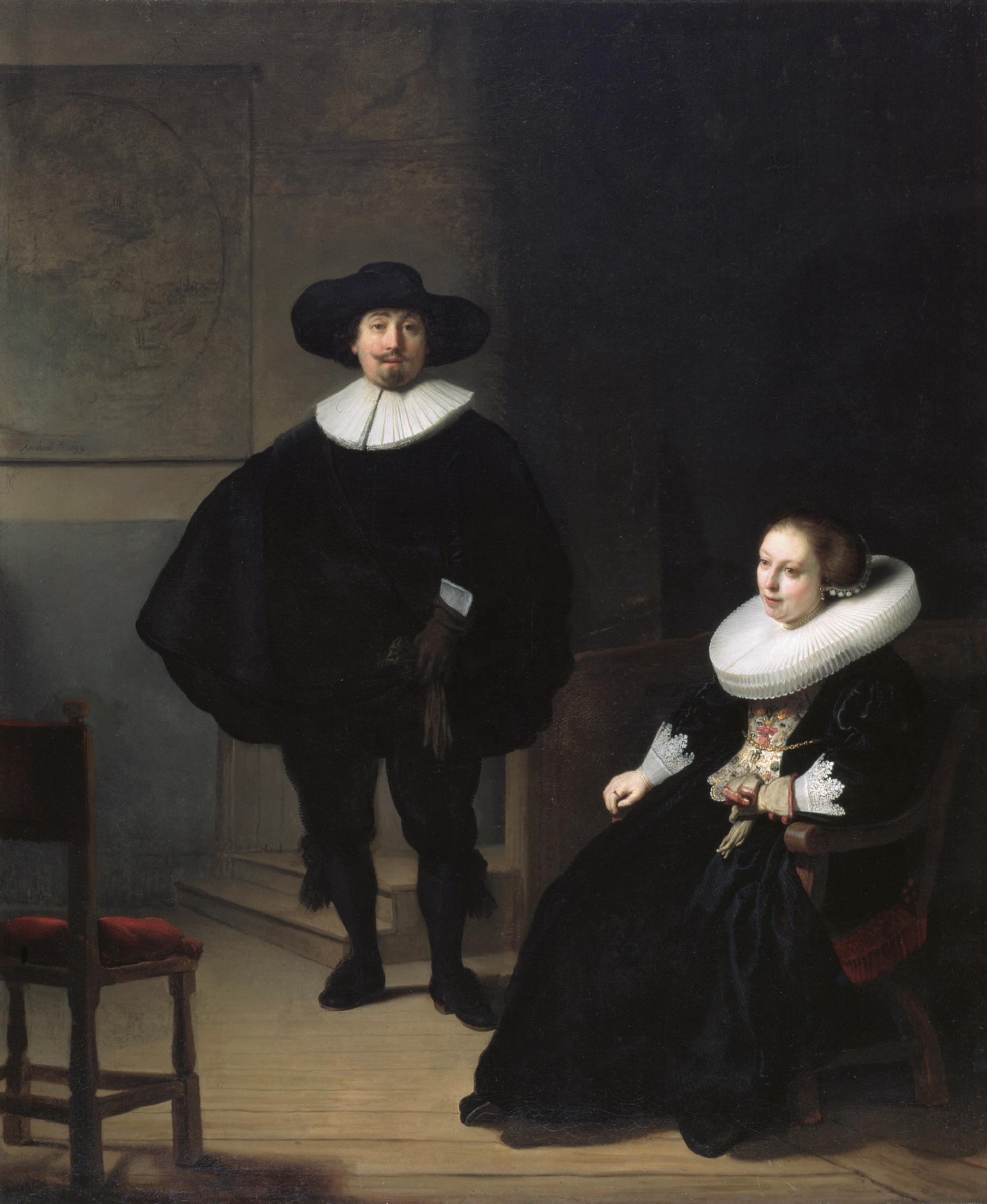
- Artist: Rembrandt
- Year: 1633
- Medium: Oil on canvas
- Dimensions: 131.6 cm × 109 cm (51.8 in × 43 in)
- Location: Unknown since its theft in 1990 from the Isabella Stewart Gardner Museum, Boston, US

A Lady and Gentleman in Black is an oil-on-canvas painting, reputedly a work of the Dutch artist Rembrandt in 1633. Measuring 131.6 by 109 centimetres (51.8 in × 42.9 in), it depicts a well-dressed husband and wife. The painting hung in the Isabella Stewart Gardner Museum of Boston, Massachusetts prior to being one of thirteen works stolen from the museum in a 1990 theft.

== Provenance ==
The authorship of the painting has been debated. In 1987, the Rembrandt Research Project (RRP) disattributed the work, considering it a product of the artist's workshop. However, the RRP re-attributed the painting to Rembrandt again in its corpus published in 2015, in which it is called Portrait of a couple in an interior. X-ray examination of the painting reveals that Rembrandt originally painted a child leaning on the seated lady's leg. Art historians speculate that the child died young and that the couple asked for the image to be painted out so as not to bring back painful memories.

Bernard Berenson purchased the painting on behalf of collector Isabella Stewart Gardner.

It hung in the Isabella Stewart Gardner Museum of Boston, Massachusetts, United States, prior to being stolen on March 18, 1990, when the canvas was crudely cut with a blade out of its stretcher and likely rolled up despite it needing to be kept flat to avoid cracking the paint. Following the theft, the painting has not resurfaced. A reward is offered for the return of the stolen items.

== See also ==
- Isabella Stewart Gardner Museum theft
- List of paintings by Rembrandt
