= Isabella Stewart Gardner Museum theft =

1990 art theft in Boston, US

Coordinates: 42.338°N 71.099°W

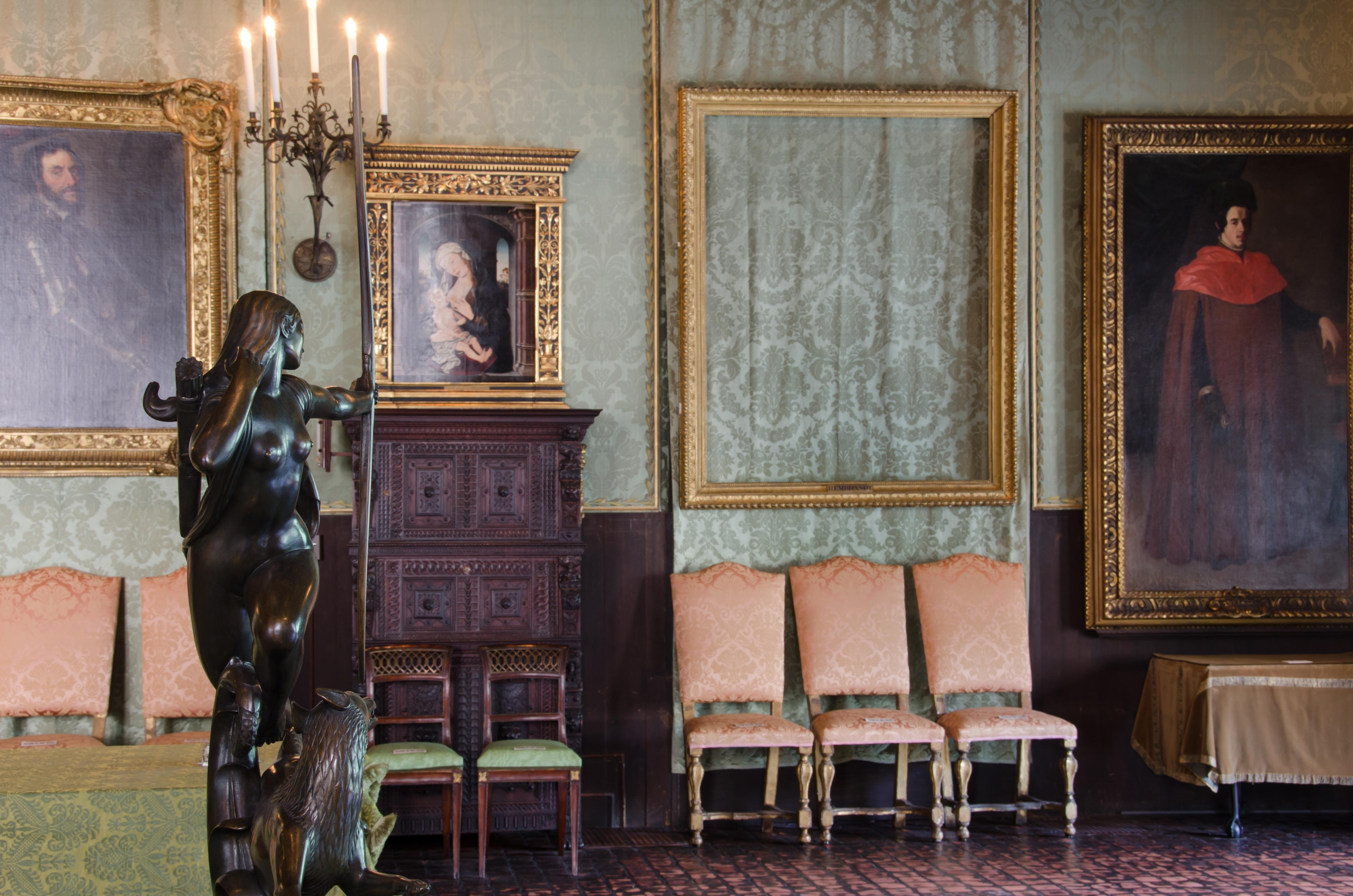
The frame which once held Rembrandt's The Storm on the Sea of Galilee (1633)

In the early hours of March 18, 1990, 13 works of art were stolen from the Isabella Stewart Gardner Museum in Boston. Security guards admitted two men posing as policemen responding to a disturbance call, and the thieves bound the guards and looted the museum over the next hour. The case is unsolved; no arrests have been made, and no works have been recovered. The stolen works have been valued at hundreds of millions of dollars by the FBI and art dealers. The museum offers a $10 million reward for information leading to the art's recovery, the largest bounty ever offered by a private institution.

The stolen works were originally procured by art collector Isabella Stewart Gardner (1840–1924) and were intended for permanent display at the museum with the rest of her collection. Among them was The Concert, one of only 34 known paintings by Johannes Vermeer and thought to be the most valuable unrecovered painting in the world. Also missing is The Storm on the Sea of Galilee, Rembrandt's only seascape. Other paintings and sketches by Rembrandt, Edgar Degas, Édouard Manet, and Govert Flinck were stolen, along with a relatively valueless eagle finial and Chinese gu. Experts were puzzled by the choice of artwork, as more valuable works were left untouched. As the collection and its layout are intended to be permanent, empty frames remain hanging both in homage to the missing works and as placeholders for their return.

The FBI believes that the robbery was planned by a criminal gang. The case lacks strong physical evidence, and the FBI has largely depended on interrogations, undercover informants, and sting operations to collect information. It has focused primarily on the Boston Mafia, which was in the midst of an internal gang war during the period. One theory holds that gangster Bobby Donati organized the heist to negotiate for his caporegime's release from prison; Donati was murdered one year after the robbery. Other accounts suggest that the paintings were stolen by a gang in Boston's Dorchester neighborhood, although these suspects deny involvement despite the fact that a sting operation resulted in several prison sentences. All have denied any knowledge or have provided leads that proved fruitless, despite the offer of reward money and reduced or canceled prison sentences if they had disclosed information leading to recovery of the artworks.

== Background ==
The Isabella Stewart Gardner Museum was constructed under the guidance of art collector Isabella Stewart Gardner (1840–1924) to house her personal art collection. The museum opened to the public in 1903, and Gardner continued to expand the collection and arrange it until she died in 1924. She left the museum with a $3.6 million endowment (equivalent to about $68 million today), and her will stipulated that the arrangement of the artwork should not be altered and that no items were to be sold from or purchased into the collection.

By the 1980s, the museum was running low on funds. This financial strain left the museum in poor condition; it lacked a climate control system and an insurance policy, and it was in need of basic building maintenance. After the FBI uncovered a plot by Boston criminals to rob the museum in 1982, the museum allocated funds to improve security. Among these improvements were 60 infrared motion detectors and a closed-circuit television system consisting of four cameras placed around the building's perimeter. No cameras had been installed inside the museum, as its board of trustees considered the cost prohibitive, but additional security guards were hired. Despite these security improvements, the only manner in which guards could summon police to the museum was by pressing a button at the security desk. Other area museums had fail-safe systems that required night watchmen to place hourly phone calls with the police to indicate that conditions were normal.

An independent consultant reviewed the museum's security operations in 1988 and determined that they were on par with most other museums but recommended improvements. The security director at the Museum of Fine Arts in Boston also suggested security upgrades to the museum. Because of the museum's financial strain and Gardner's directive forbidding major renovations, the board of trustees did not approve these security enhancements. The board also denied a request from the security director for higher guard salaries in a bid to attract more qualified applicants. The museum's guards were paid slightly higher than minimum wage, and the museum's security flaws were an open secret among the guards.

== Robbery ==
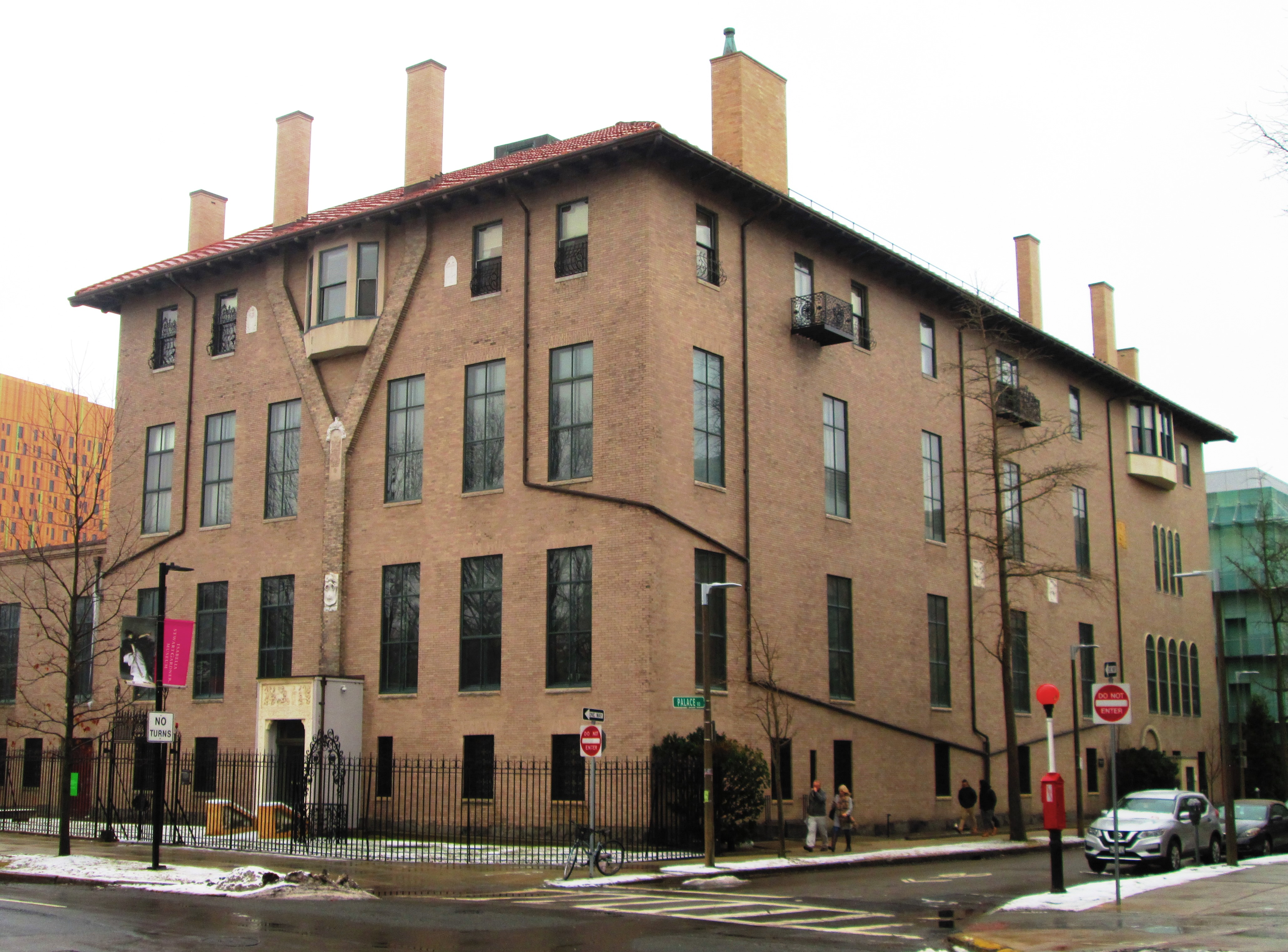
The Gardner Museum in 2018

=== Prelude ===
The robbery occurred early on Sunday, March 18, 1990. The thieves were first witnessed around 12:30 a.m. by several St. Patrick's Day revelers leaving a party near the museum. The two men were disguised as police officers and parked in a hatchback on Palace Road, about a hundred feet from the side entrance. The witnesses believed them to be policemen.

The museum guards on duty that night were Rick Abath, age 23, and Randy Hestand, age 25. Abath was a regular night watchman, but Hestand seldom worked the night shift. The museum's security policy required that one guard would patrol the galleries with a flashlight and walkie-talkie while the other would sit at the security desk. When Abath took the first patrol, fire alarms sounded in several rooms, but he could not locate any fire or smoke. He returned to the security room where the fire alarm control panel indicated smoke in multiple rooms. He assumed that some type of malfunction had occurred and disabled the panel before returning to his patrol. Before completing his rounds, Abath stopped at the side entrance of the museum, briefly opening the side door and shutting it again without informing Hestand. Abath returned to the security desk around 1:00 a.m., and Hestand assumed patrol duties.

=== Guards are subdued ===
At 1:20 a.m., the thieves drove to the side entrance, parked and walked to the side door. They rang the buzzer, which connected them to Abath through an intercom. They explained to Abath that they were police investigating a disturbance and that they must be admitted. Abath could see them on the closed-circuit television wearing what appeared to be police uniforms. He was not aware of any disturbance, but he surmised that a St. Patrick's Day reveler may have climbed over the fence, causing someone to report it to the police. Abath admitted the men at 1:24 a.m.

The thieves first entered a locked foyer that separated the side door from the museum. They approached Abath at the security desk and asked if anyone else was in the museum. Abath radioed Hestand to return to the security desk. Abath noticed around this time that the taller man's moustache appeared to be fake. The shorter man told Abath that he looked familiar and that they may have a warrant for his arrest, demanding that Abath emerge from behind the desk to provide identification. Abath complied, leaving the desk that contained the museum's only panic button that could alert police. The shorter man forced Abath against a wall, spread his legs and handcuffed him. Hestand walked into the room around this time, and the taller thief turned him toward the wall and handcuffed him. With both guards handcuffed, the thieves revealed their true intentions to rob the museum and asked the guards not to cause any problems.

The thieves wrapped duct tape around the heads and eyes of the guards. Without asking for directions, they led the guards into the basement, where the guards were handcuffed to a steam pipe and workbench. The thieves examined the guards' wallets and threatened that they knew where the guards lived and told them that if they would not inform the authorities, they would receive a reward in about a year. It took the thieves less than 15 minutes to subdue the guards, which they completed at about 1:35 a.m.

=== Stealing the works ===
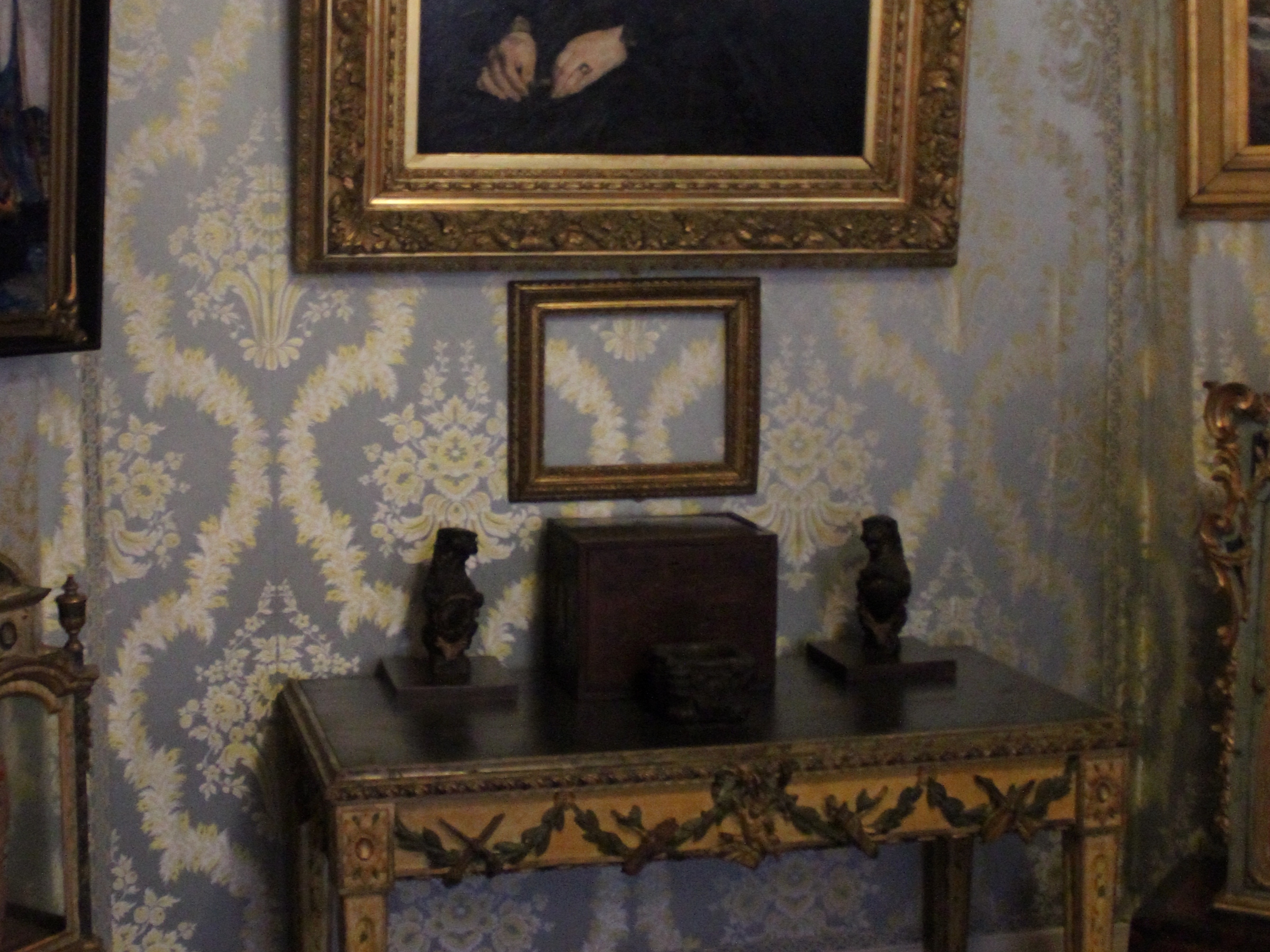
The frame that once held Chez Tortoni

The thieves' movements through the museum were recorded on infrared motion detectors. Steps in the first room they entered, the Dutch Room on the second floor, were not recorded until 1:48 a.m. This was 13 minutes after they had finished subduing the guards, perhaps waiting to ensure that police had not been alerted.

As the thieves approached the paintings in the Dutch Room, a sensor sounded that was intended to alert when patrons moved too close to artwork, and the thieves smashed the device. They removed The Storm on the Sea of Galilee and A Lady and Gentleman in Black from the wall and threw them on the marble floor, which shattered their glass frames. Using a blade, they cut the canvases out of their stretchers. They also removed a large Rembrandt self-portrait oil painting from the wall but left it leaning against a cabinet. Investigators believe that the thieves may have considered it too large to transport, potentially because it was painted on wood and not canvas like the others. The thieves instead took a small postage-stamp-sized self-portrait etching by Rembrandt on display beneath the larger portrait. On the right side of the room, they removed Landscape with Obelisk and The Concert from their frames. The final piece taken from the room was an ancient Chinese gu.

At 1:51 a.m., while one thief continued working in the Dutch Room, the other entered a narrow hallway dubbed the Short Gallery on the other end of the second floor. Soon both men were in the Short Gallery, where they began removing screws for a frame displaying a Napoleonic flag, likely an effort to steal the flag. They appeared to have abandoned the effort, as some screws were not removed, and they ultimately took only the exposed eagle finial atop the flagpole. They also took five Degas sketches from the room. The last work stolen was Chez Tortoni from the Blue Room on the first floor. The museum's motion detectors did not detect any motion within the Blue Room during the thieves' time in the building. The only footsteps detected in the room that night were Abath's during the two times when he passed through the gallery on his earlier patrol.

As they prepared to leave, the thieves checked the guards again and asked if they were comfortable. The thieves then moved to the security director's office, where they took the video cassettes that contained evidence of their entrance from the closed-circuit cameras as well as the data printouts from the motion-detecting equipment. The movement data was also captured on a hard drive, which remained untouched. The frame for Chez Tortoni was left at the security director's desk. The thieves then began to remove the artwork from the museum. The side entrance doors were opened at 2:40 a.m. and again for the last time at 2:45 a.m. The robbery lasted 81 minutes.

The next guard shift arrived later in the morning and realized that something was amiss when they could not establish contact with anyone inside for admittance. They called the security director, who entered the building with his keys and found nobody at the watch desk before calling the police. The police searched the building and found the guards still bound in the basement.

== Stolen artwork ==
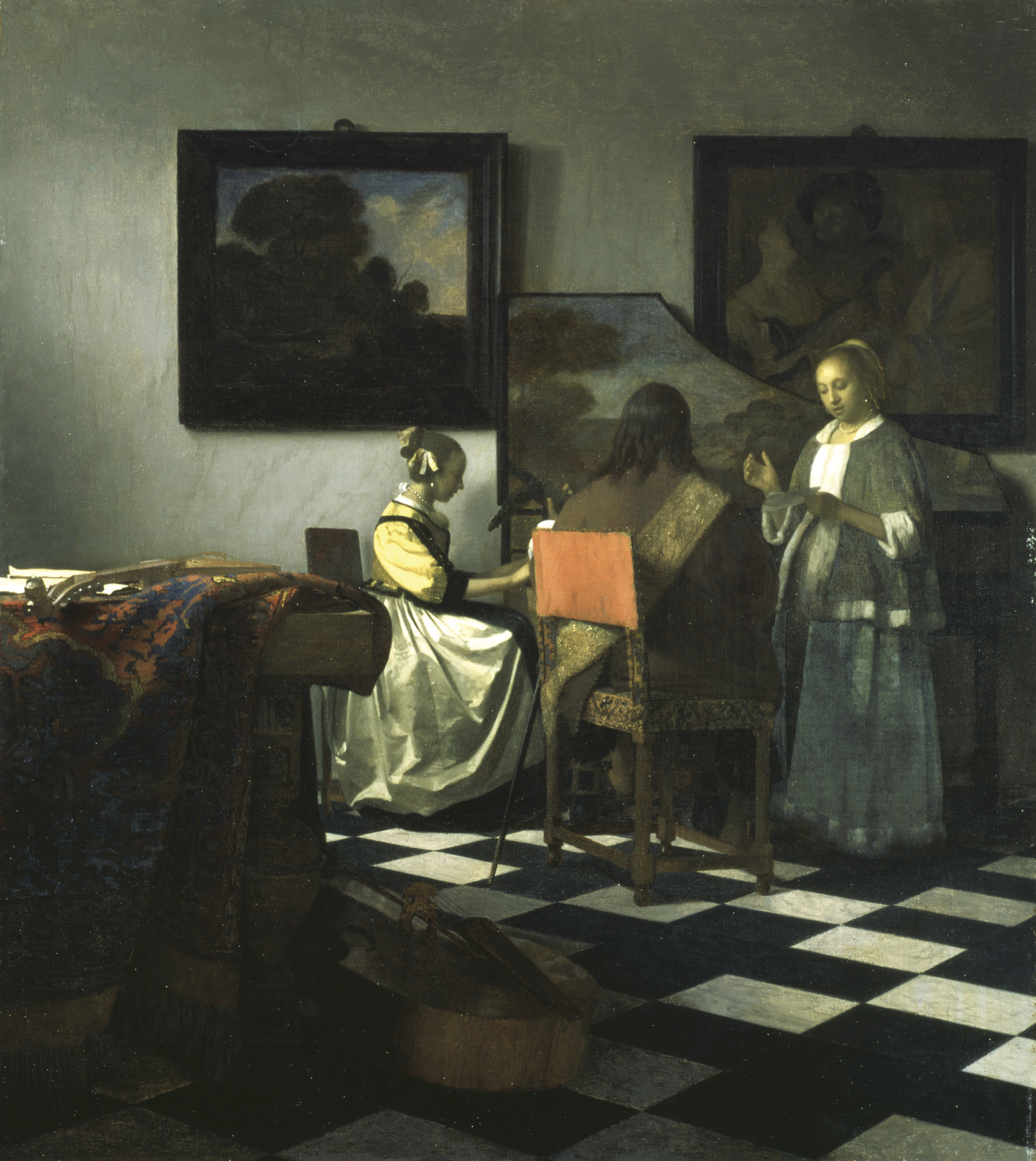
The Concert – Vermeer

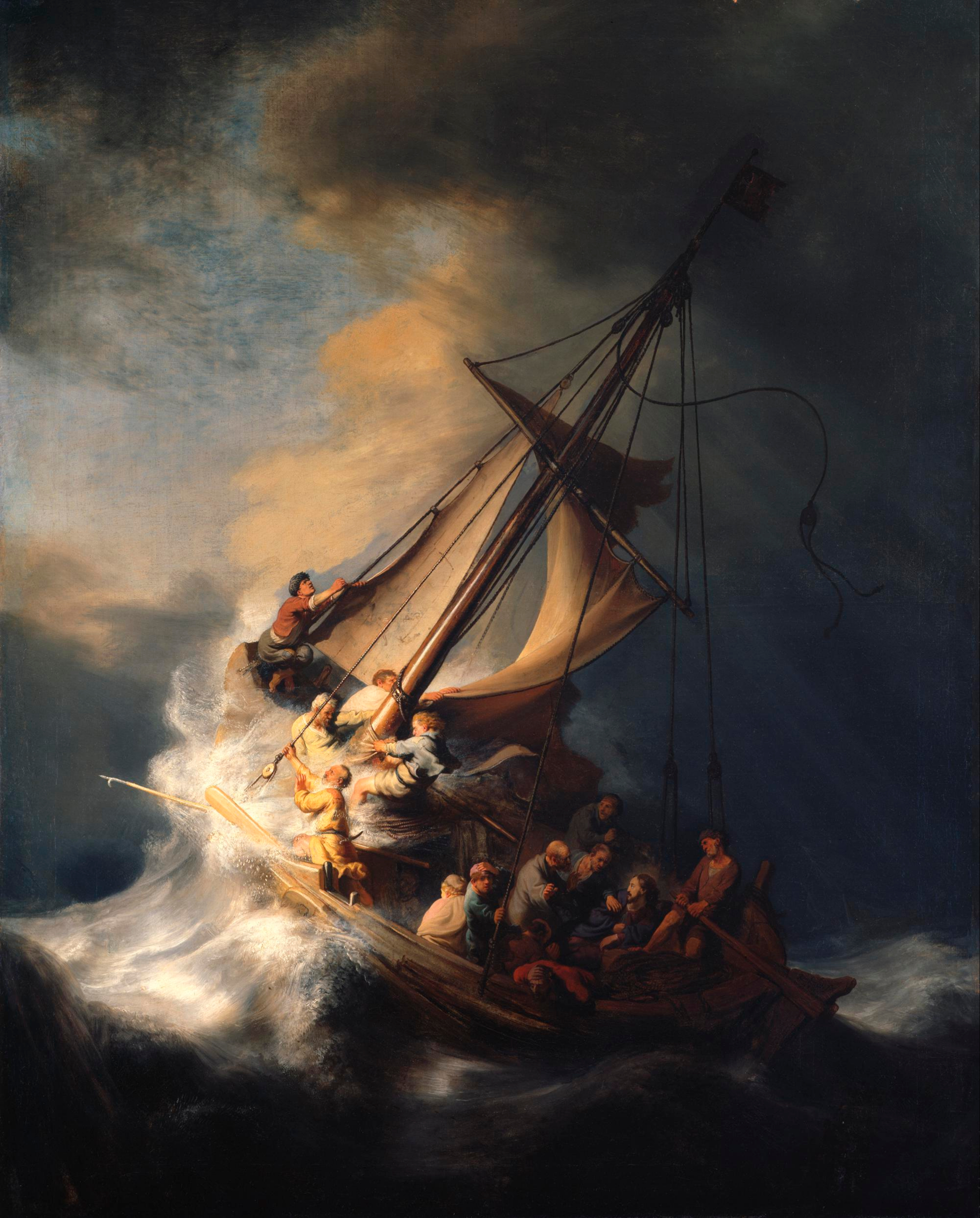
The Storm on the Sea of Galilee – Rembrandt

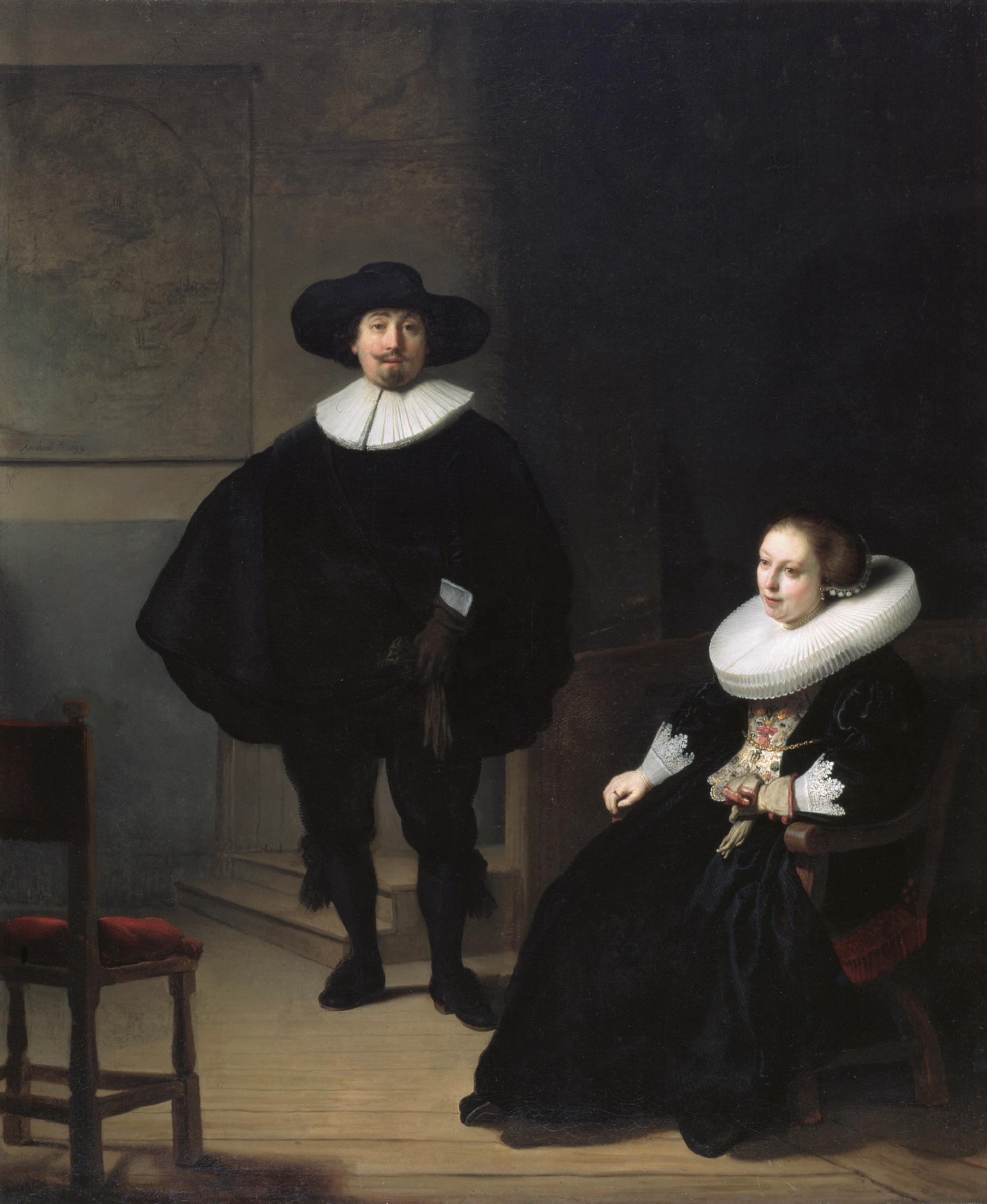
A Lady and Gentleman in Black – Rembrandt

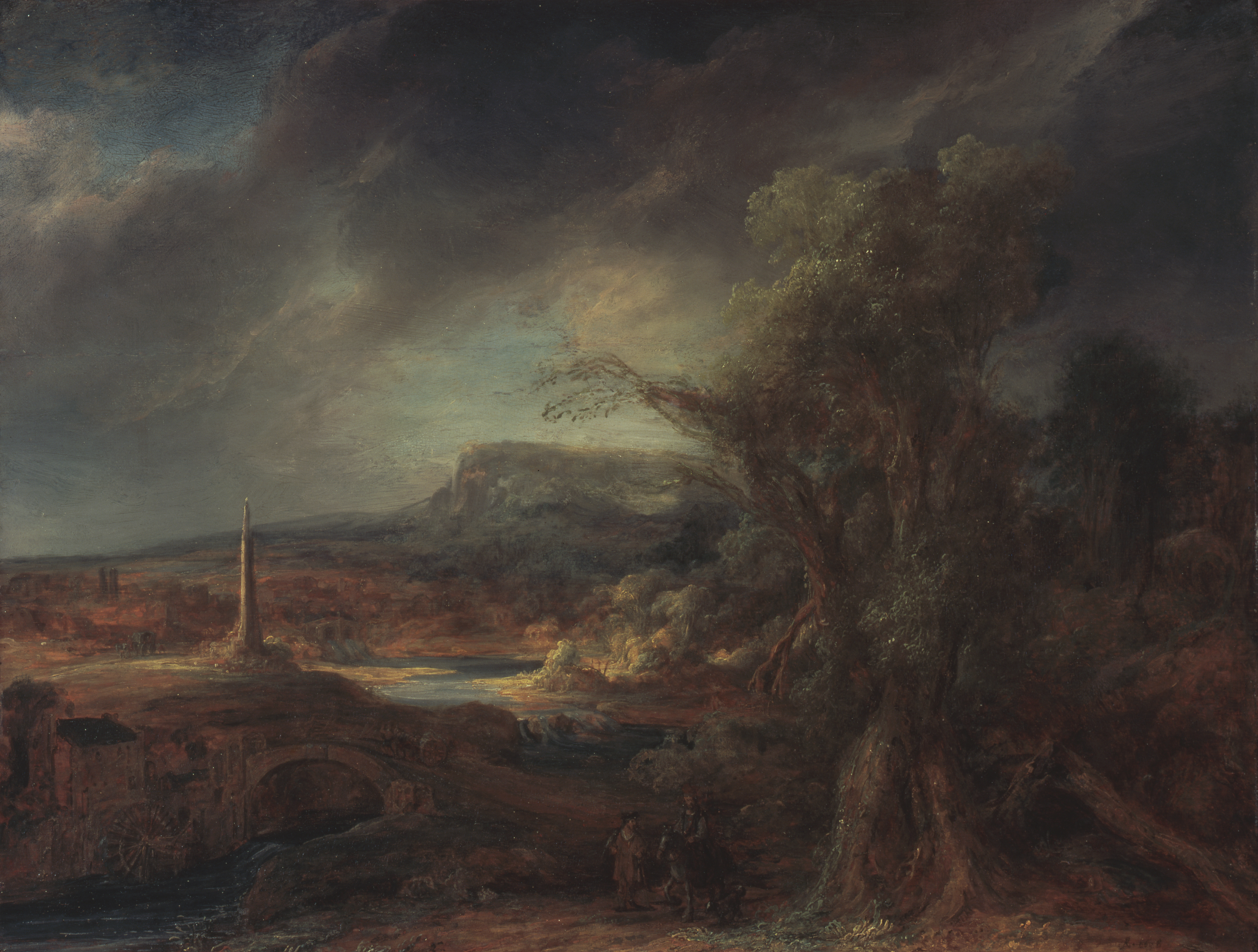
Landscape with Obelisk – Flinck

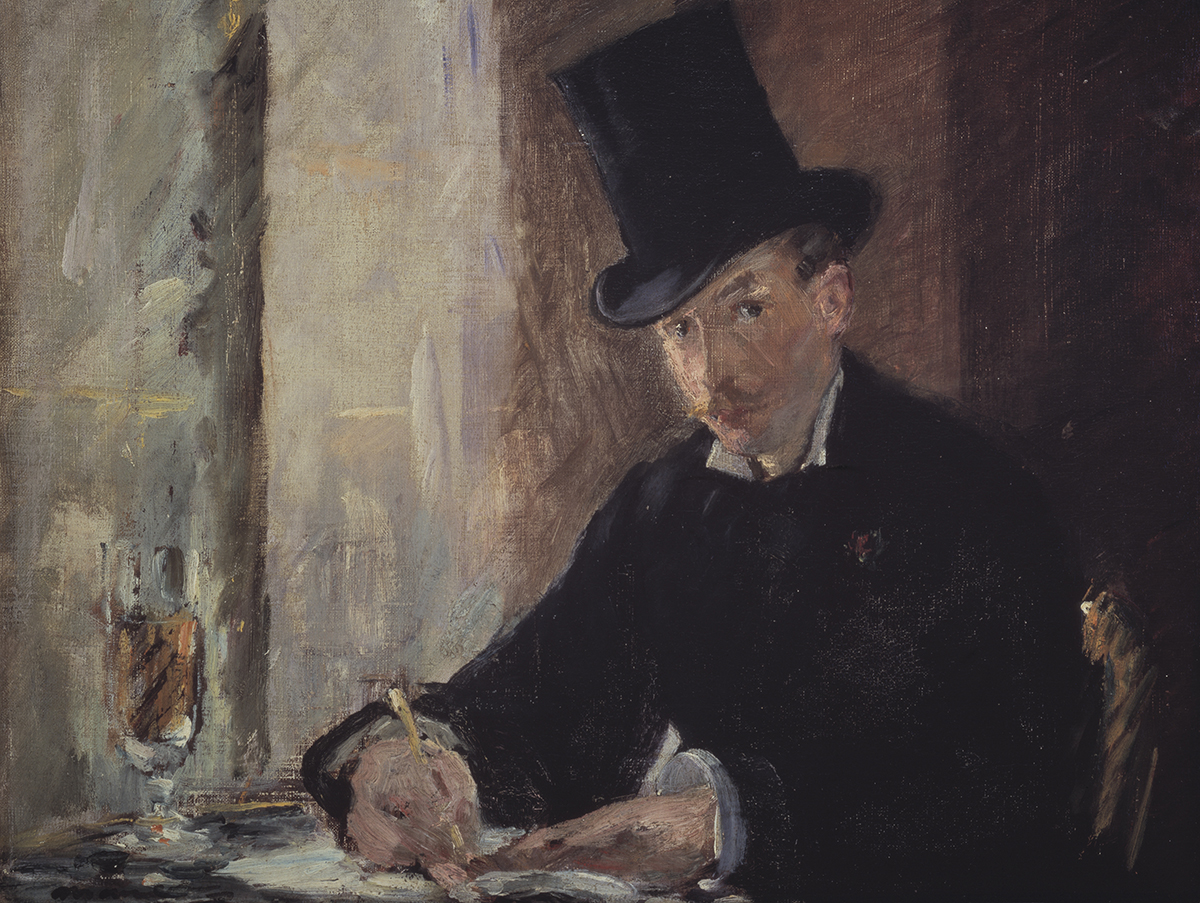
Chez Tortoni – Manet

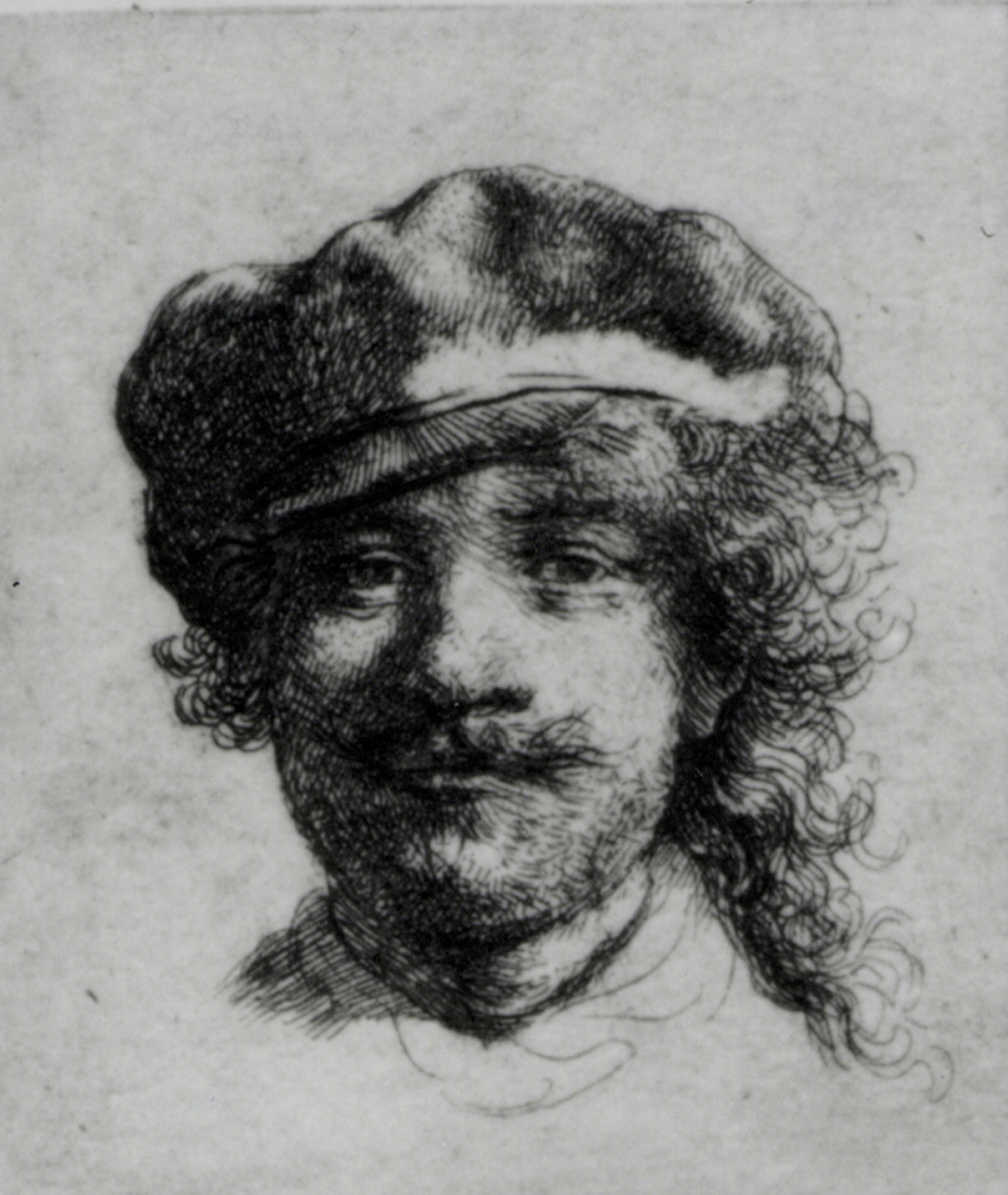
Self-Portrait – Rembrandt

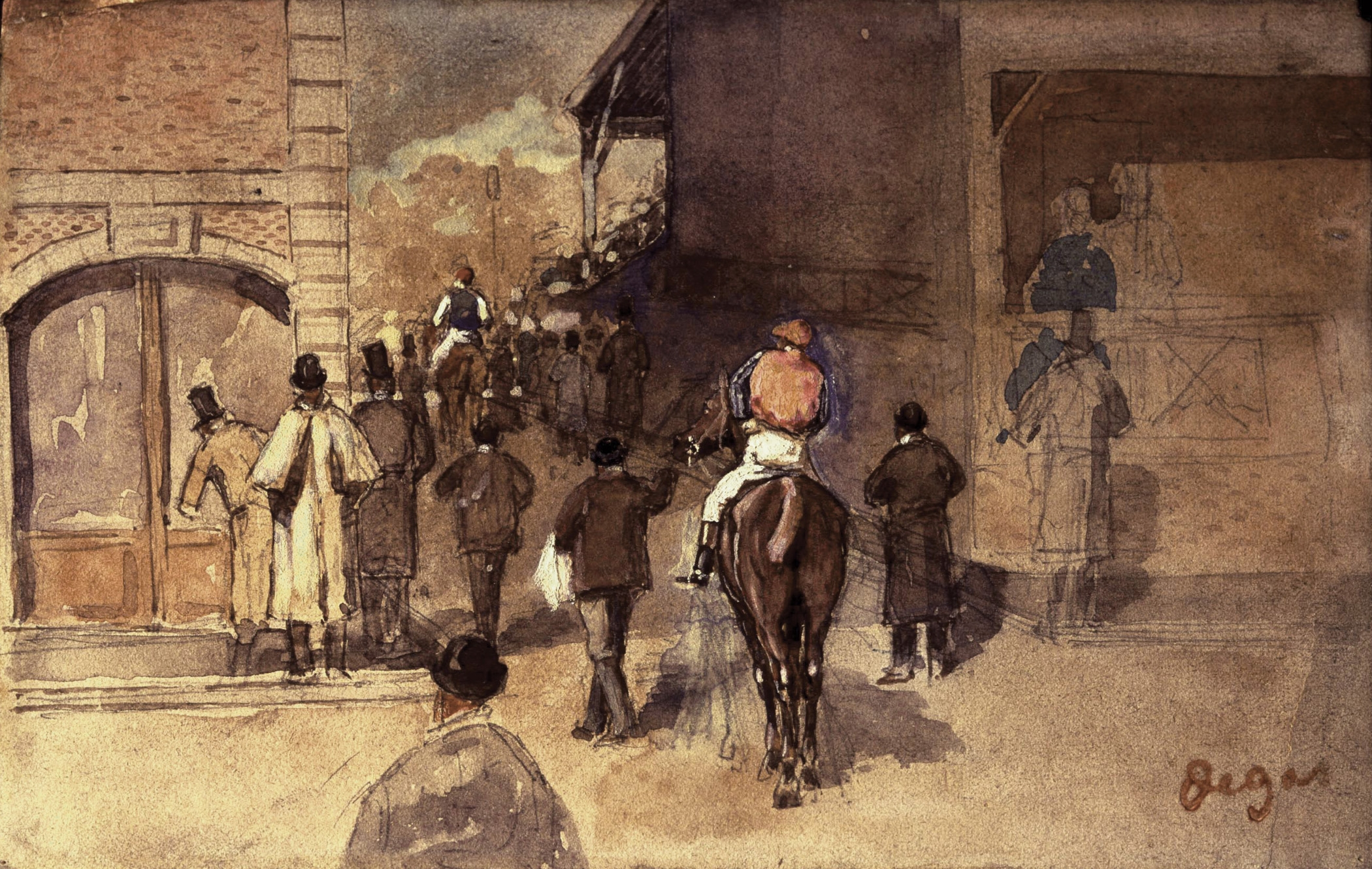
La Sortie de Pesage – Degas

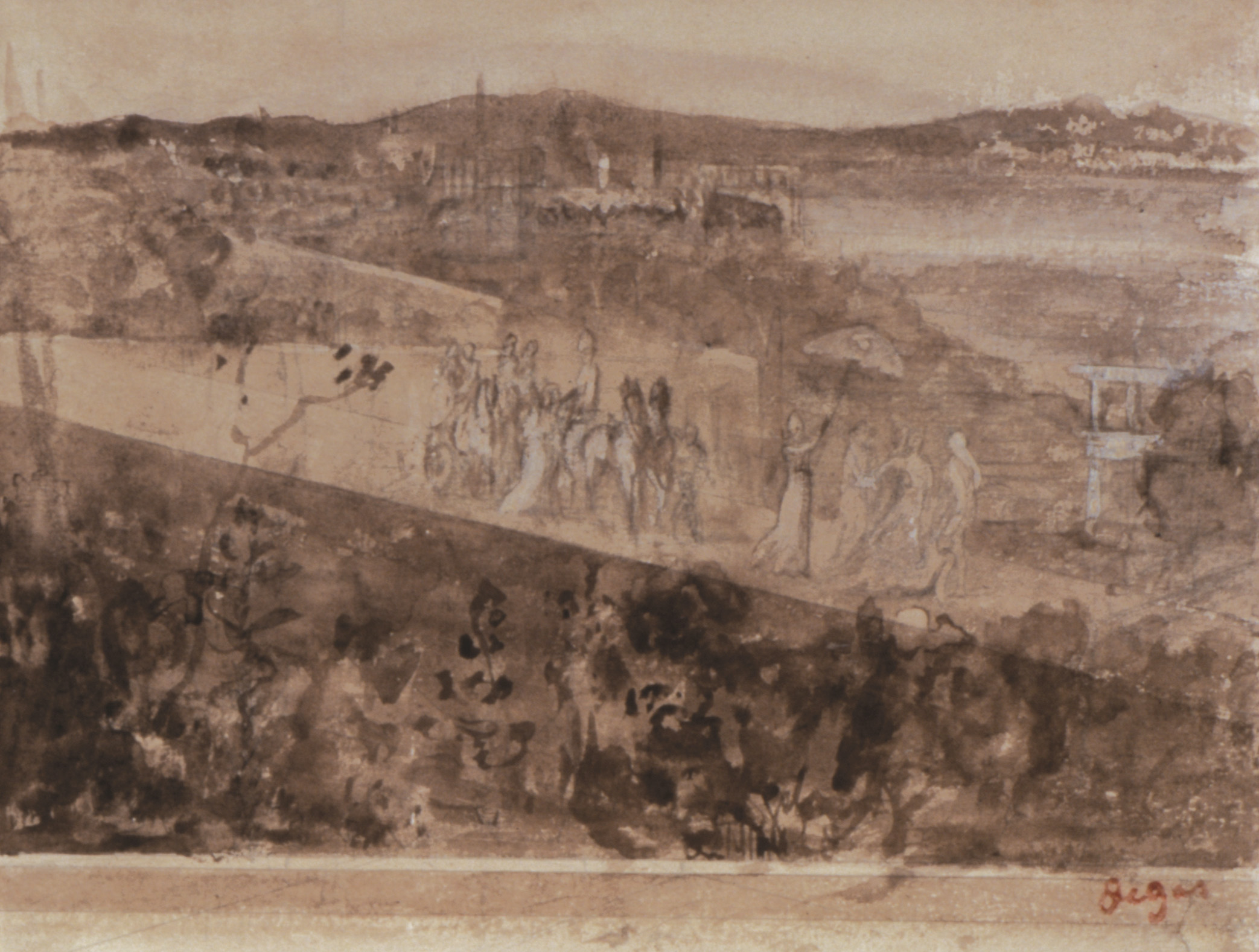
Cortege aux Environs de Florence – Degas

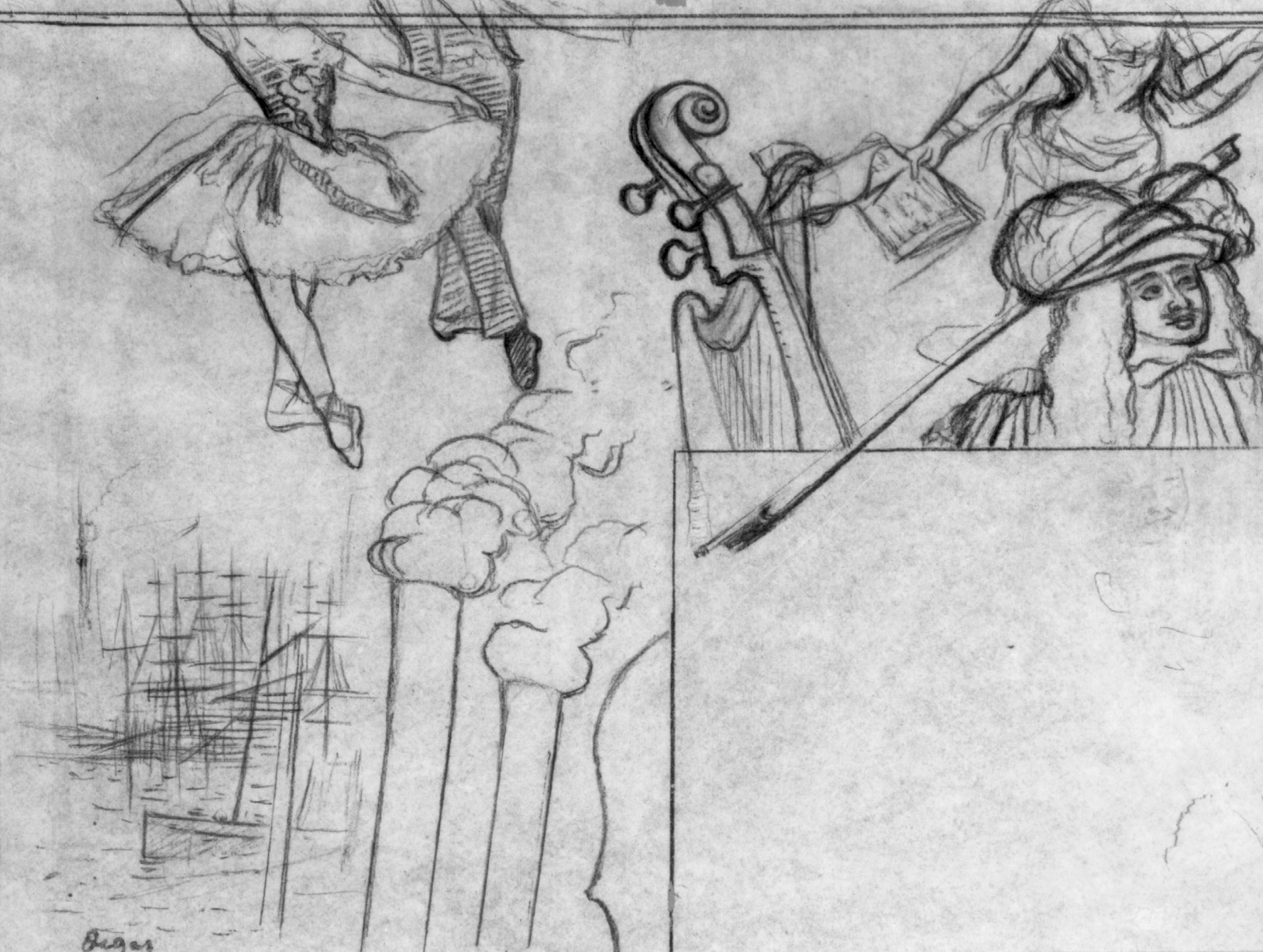
Program for an Artistic Soirée 1 – Degas

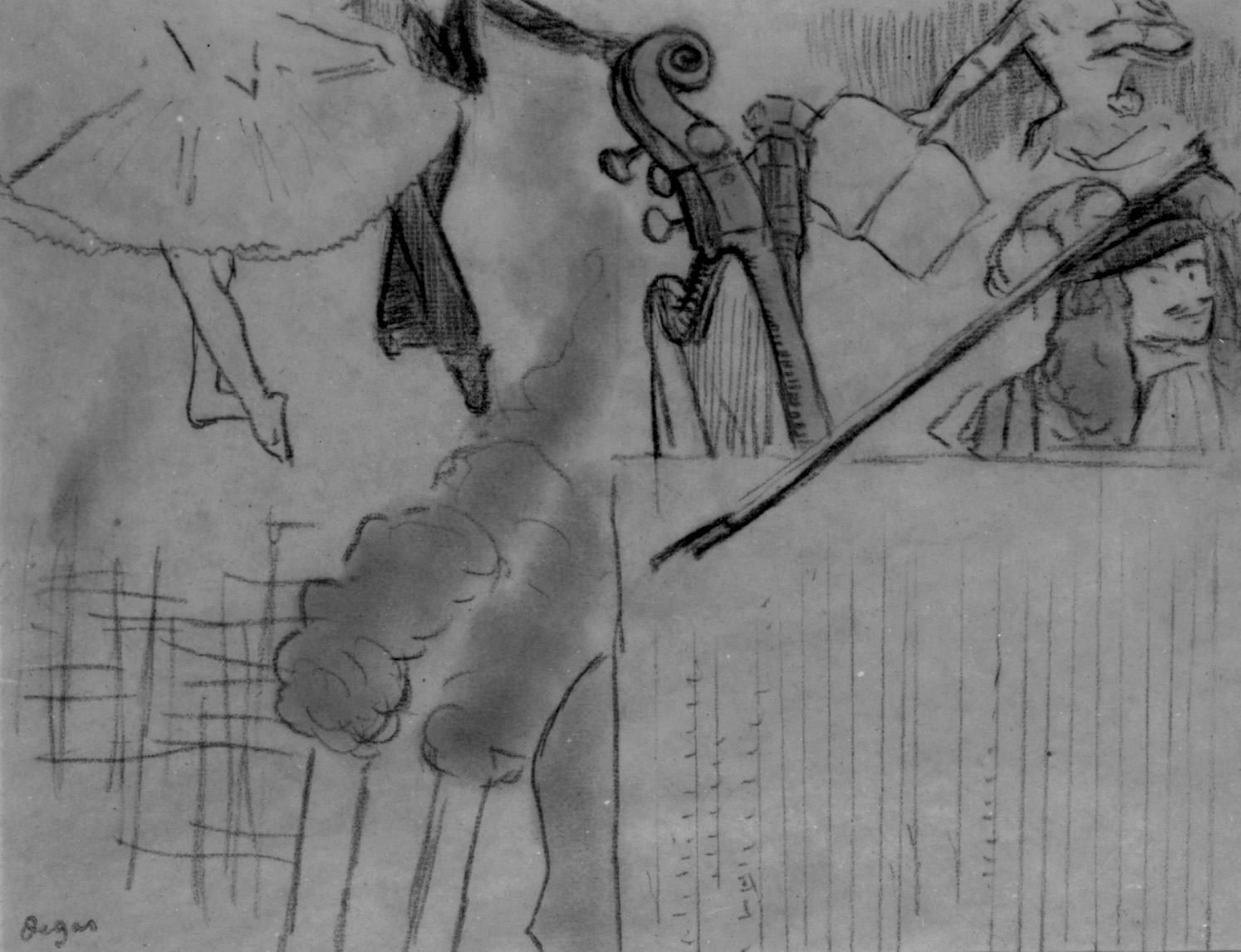
Program for an Artistic Soirée 2 – Degas

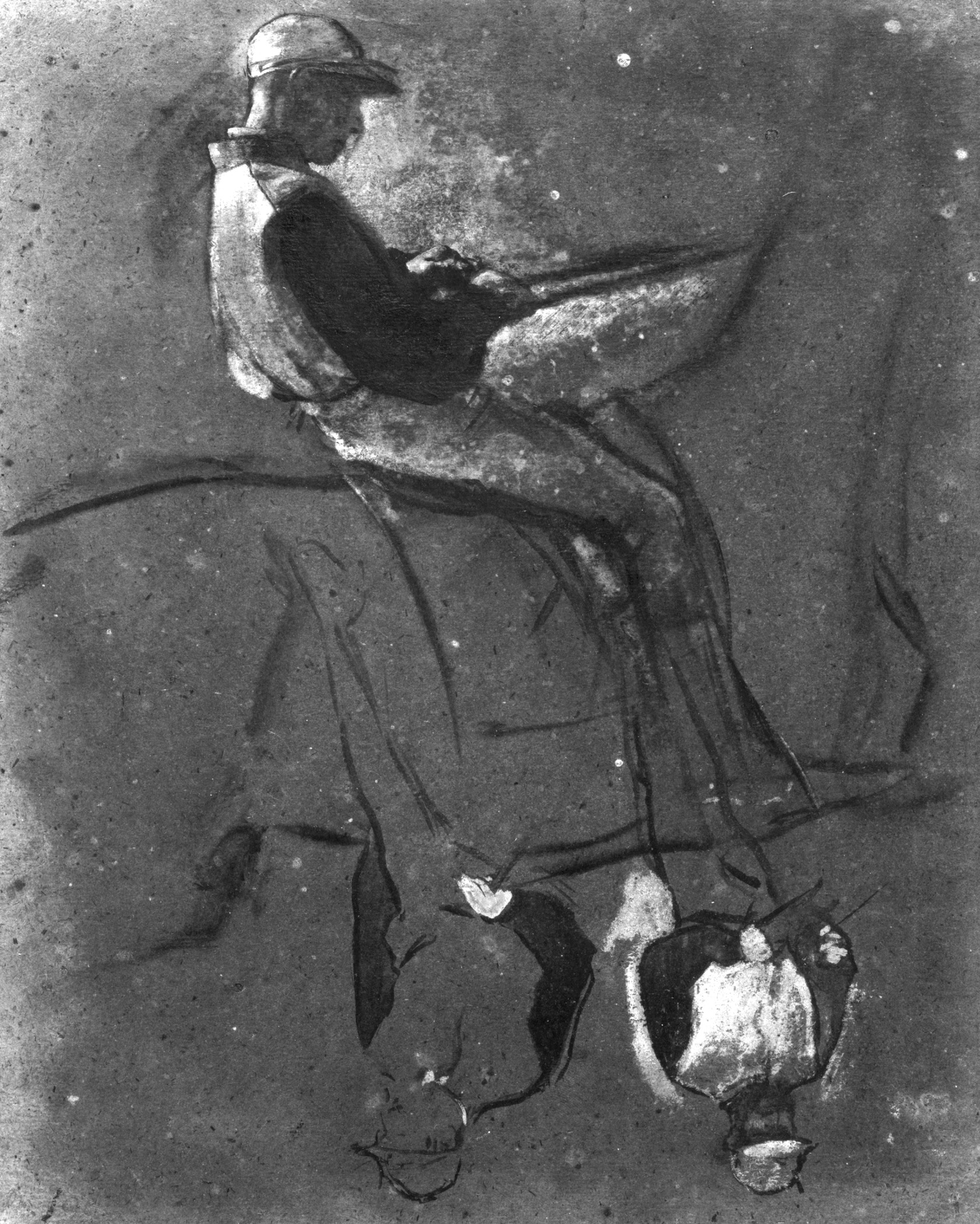
Three Mounted Jockeys – Degas

Thirteen works were stolen. In 1990, the FBI estimated the value of the theft at $200 million and raised the estimate to $500 million by 2000. In the late 2000s, some art dealers suggested that the total value of the stolen artwork could be $600 million. It is considered the highest-value museum robbery in history.

The most valuable works were taken from the Dutch Room. Among these was The Concert by Dutch painter Vermeer (1632–1675), one of only 34 (Note: The number of paintings attributed to Vermeer is disputed.) paintings attributed to him. The painting accounts for half of the overall theft's value, estimated at $250 million in 2015. Experts believe that The Concert may be the most valuable stolen object in the world. In the same room, the thieves targeted works by Dutch painter Rembrandt (1606–1669). These include The Storm on the Sea of Galilee, his only seascape and the most valuable of his works stolen that night. Estimates have placed its value at about $140 million. The other Rembrandt works taken were A Lady and Gentleman in Black and a small postage-stamp-sized self-portrait etching. The latter was previously stolen and returned in 1970. The thieves may have taken Landscape with Obelisk believing that it was a Rembrandt; it was long attributed to him until it was quietly credited to his pupil Govert Flinck (1615–1660) a few years before the heist. The last item taken from the Dutch Room was a bronze gu about 10 inches (25 cm) tall. Traditionally used for serving wine in ancient China, the beaker was one of the oldest works in the museum, dating to the Shang Dynasty in the 12th century BC. Its estimated value is several thousand dollars.

In the Short Gallery, five sketches by French artist Edgar Degas (1834–1917) were stolen. They were each drawn on paper less than a square foot in size and made with pencils, inks, washes and charcoal. They are of relatively little value compared with the other stolen works, worth less than $100,000 combined. Also taken was a 10-inch-tall (25 cm) French Imperial Eagle finial from the corner of a framed flag for Napoleon's Imperial Guard. There is a $100,000 reward for information leading to the return of the finial alone. It possibly appeared to be made of gold to the thieves. Chez Tortoni by French painter Édouard Manet (1832–1883) was taken from the Blue Room; it was the only item taken from the first floor.

The eclectic mix of items has puzzled experts. While some of the paintings were valuable, the thieves passed other valuable works by Raphael, Botticelli and Michelangelo and left them undisturbed, opting to take relatively valueless items such as the gu and finial. The thieves did not enter the third floor where Titian's The Rape of Europa hung, which is among the most valuable paintings in the city. The selection of works and the thieves' rough treatment of the artwork has led investigators to believe that the thieves were not experts commissioned to steal particular works. In addition to the damage inflicted upon the stolen works on canvas which were crudely cut with a blade out of their stretchers, many of the works were then likely rolled up and, in doing so, were probably damaged. Furthermore, conservationists have stressed that a failure to properly store most of the stolen works under optimal conservation conditions would also guarantee further damage (if any of the works even remain in existence).

As Gardner's will decreed that nothing in her collection should be moved, the empty frames for the stolen paintings remain hanging in their respective locations in the museum as placeholders for their potential return. Because of the museum's low funds and lack of an insurance policy, the director solicited help from Sotheby's and Christie's auction houses to post a reward of $1 million within three days. This was increased to $5 million in 1997. In 2017, it was doubled to $10 million with an expiration date set for the end of the year. This reward was extended following an outpouring of tips from the public. It is the largest bounty ever offered by a private institution. (Note: The Gardner Museum's reward has only been exceeded by the US government's $25 million bounty for Osama bin Laden.) The reward is for "information that leads directly to the recovery of all of [their] items in good condition." Federal prosecutors have stated that anyone who willingly returns the items will not be prosecuted. The statute of limitations expired in 1995 as well, so the thieves and anyone else who participated in the theft cannot be prosecuted.

== Early leads and people of interest ==
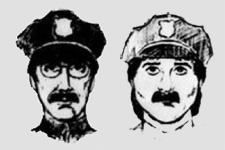
Police sketches of the thieves

The FBI took immediate control of the case on the grounds that the artwork could likely cross state lines. Investigators have called the case unique for its lack of strong physical evidence. It is unknown if the thieves left DNA evidence. Although fingerprints and footprints were found at the scene, it could not be concluded whether they were from the thieves or from museum employees. The FBI has performed DNA analysis in the years following the theft as advances in the field have grown. Some of the evidence has been lost among the agency's files. The guards and witnesses in the street described one thief as about 5 feet 9 inches (1.75 m) to 5 feet 10 inches (1.78 m) in his late 30s with a medium build, and the other as 6 feet 0 inches (1.83 m) to 6 feet 1 inch (1.85 m) in his early 30s with a heavier build.

=== Rick Abath ===
Security guard Richard Edward Abath was investigated at an early stage because of his suspicious behavior on the night of the theft.

- While on patrol, Abath briefly opened and closed a side door, a move some believe was perhaps a signal to the thieves parked outside. Abath told authorities that he did this routinely to ensure that the door was locked. One of Abath's colleagues told journalists that if Abath opened the door routinely as he claimed, supervisors would have noticed this from their computer printouts and stopped the behavior.
- Suspicion has surrounded the museum's motion detectors, which detected no movement in the Blue Room (which housed Chez Tortoni) while the thieves were in the museum. The only footsteps recorded in the room that night were Abath's during his security patrol. A security consultant who reviewed the motion-detector equipment several weeks after the theft determined it was operating correctly.
- In 2015, the FBI released security video showing Abath admitting an unidentified man into the museum to converse at the security desk. Abath told investigators he could not recall the incident or recognize the man, and the FBI requested the public's assistance. Several former museum guards came forward and identified the stranger as the museum's deputy security chief.

Abath, who died in 2024 at age 57, maintained his innocence throughout his life. The FBI agent overseeing the case in its early years concluded that the guards were too incompetent and foolish to commit the crime.

=== Whitey Bulger ===
Whitey Bulger was one of the most powerful crime bosses in Boston during the era, heading the Winter Hill Gang. He denied involvement and dispatched his subordinates to identify the culprits because the robbery was committed in his area and he wanted to be paid tribute.

FBI agent Thomas McShane investigated Bulger to determine his involvement. He determined that Bulger's strong ties with the Boston police could explain how the thieves acquired legitimate police uniforms, or perhaps that real police were arranged to perform the heist. Bulger also had ties to the Provisional Irish Republican Army (IRA). McShane identified the act of tripping the fire alarm before the heist as a "calling card" of the IRA and of its rival Ulster Volunteer Force (UVF). Both organizations had agents in Boston at the time, and both had previously demonstrated the capability to organize art heists. McShane's investigation of Bulger and the IRA did not produce any evidence to tie them to the theft. According to Charley Hill, a retired art and antiquities investigator for Scotland Yard, Bulger gave the Gardner works to the IRA and they are most likely in Ireland.

=== 1994 letter to the museum ===
In 1994, museum director Anne Hawley received an anonymous letter from someone who claimed to be attempting to negotiate return of the artwork. The writer explained that they were a third-party negotiator and did not know the identity of the thieves. They explained that the artwork was stolen to reduce a prison sentence, but as the opportunity had passed, there was no longer a motive to keep the artwork and they wanted to negotiate a return. The writer explained that the artwork was being held in a "non-common law country" under climate-controlled conditions. They wanted immunity for themselves and all involved, and $2.6 million for return of the artwork, to be sent to an offshore bank account when the art was handed over. If the museum was interested in negotiating, it should print a coded message in The Boston Globe. To establish credibility, the writer conveyed information only known by the museum and FBI at the time.

Hawley felt this was a strong lead. She contacted the FBI, which then contacted the Globe; the coded message was printed in the May 1, 1994, edition of The Boston Globe. Hawley received a second letter a few days later in which the writer acknowledged the museum was interested in negotiating, but that they had become fearful of what they perceived was a massive investigation by federal and state authorities to determine their identity. The writer explained that they needed time to evaluate their options, but Hawley never heard from the writer again.

=== Brian McDevitt ===
Brian McDevitt was a conman from Boston who tried to rob The Hyde Collection in Glens Falls, New York, in 1981. He dressed up as a FedEx driver, carried handcuffs and duct tape, and planned to steal a Rembrandt. He was also a known flag aficionado and fit the description of the larger robber except for his thinning red hair. These parallels to the Gardner case fascinated the FBI, so they interviewed him in late 1990. McDevitt denied any involvement and refused to take a polygraph test. The FBI ran his fingerprints which matched none at the crime scene. McDevitt later moved to California and conned his way into television and film writing. He died in 2004.

== Investigation of the Boston Mafia ==
=== Merlino gang ===
The FBI announced significant progress in its investigation in March 2013. It reported "with a high degree of confidence" that it had identified the thieves, which it believed were members of a criminal organization in the mid-Atlantic and New England. It also felt "with that same confidence" that the artwork was transported to Connecticut and Philadelphia in years following the theft, with an attempted sale in Philadelphia in 2002. Its knowledge of what happened thereafter is limited, and it requested the public's help to locate and return the artwork. In 2015, the FBI stated both thieves were deceased. Though the FBI did not publicly identify any individuals, sources familiar with the investigation said they were associated with a gang from Dorchester was loyal to Boston Mafia boss Frank Salemme and ran their operations from an automobile repair shop run by criminal Carmello Merlino.

Merlino's associates may have gained knowledge of the museum's weaknesses after gangster Louis Royce cased it as early as 1981. He devised plans with an associate to light smoke bombs and rush the galleries amidst the confusion. In 1982, when undercover FBI agents investigated Royce and his associates for an unrelated art theft, they learned of their interest in robbing the Gardner Museum and warned the museum of the gang's plan. Royce was in prison at the time of the robbery. Royce shared his plan with others and believed associate Stephen Rossetti perhaps ordered the robbery or shared the plan with someone else.

==== Robert Guarente and Robert Gentile ====
Among those associated with the Merlino gang were Robert Guarente and Manchester, Connecticut gangster Robert Gentile. Guarente died from cancer in 2004, but his widow Elene told the FBI in 2010 that her husband previously owned some of the paintings. She claimed that when her husband got sick with cancer in the early 2000s, he gave the paintings to Gentile for safekeeping. Gentile denied the accusations, claiming he was never given them and knew nothing of their whereabouts. Federal authorities indicted Gentile on drug charges in 2012, likely in an attempt to pressure Gentile for information about the Gardner works. He submitted to a polygraph test which indicated he was lying when he denied any knowledge of the theft or location of the artwork. Gentile maintained he was telling the truth and demanded a retest. During the retest, he said Elene had once shown him the missing Rembrandt self-portrait, which the polygraph machine indicated he true. Gentile's lawyer felt that the veracity of Gentile's claims were being affected by the large presence of federal agents and requested a smaller meeting in hopes that it would get Gentile to speak honestly. In the more intimate meeting, Gentile maintained that he have no information.

A few days later, the FBI stormed Gentile's house in Manchester with a search warrant. The FBI found a secret ditch beneath a false floor in the backyard shed but found it empty. Gentile's son explained that the ditch flooded a few years prior, and his father was upset about whatever was stored there. In the basement, they found a copy of the Boston Herald from March 1990 reporting the theft and a piece of paper indicating what each piece might sell for on the black market. Beyond this, no conclusive evidence was found to indicate he ever had the paintings. Gentile went to prison for 30 months on drug charges. If he had information about the theft, he never opted to share it, which would have reduced his sentence or freed him from prison. After leaving prison, he spoke with investigative reporter Stephen Kurkjian, claiming he was framed by the FBI. He explained how the imprisonment was detrimental to his finances and personal life. He also explained that the list found in his basement was written by a criminal trying to broker return of the works from Guarente and was talking to Gentile as an intermediary. When asked about what could have been in the ditch, Gentile could not recall but believed it could have been small motors.

==== David Turner ====
David Turner was another associate of Merlino. The FBI began investigating him in 1992 when a source told it Turner had access to the paintings. Merlino was arrested that same year for cocaine trafficking and told authorities that he could return the paintings for a reduced prison sentence. He asked Turner to track down the paintings; Turner did not return them, though he heard they were in a church in South Boston. Another associate arrested in the drug sting told authorities that Turner was involved in several break-ins but never mentioned the Gardner heist. Based on conversations with Merlino after his release from prison in the mid 1990s, authorities gathered that Merlino never had direct access to the paintings but possibly could broker their return.

Despite Turner’s claims of innocence, the FBI believes he may have been one of the thieves. Evidence indicates that he went to Florida to pick up a cocaine order just days before the heist, and credit card records suggest he remained there through the night of the robbery, but some investigators believe this may have been Turner's attempt to create an alibi. The FBI thinks the other thief was his friend and Merlino associate George Reissfelder, who died in July 1991. No clues were found in his apartment or the homes of friends and relatives, but his siblings recall a painting similar to Chez Tortoni in his bedroom. Investigators believe he looks similar to the slimmer man in the police sketches.

In 1999, the FBI arrested Turner, Merlino, Rossetti, and others in a sting operation the day they planned to rob a Loomis Fargo vault. When questioning Turner, the FBI stated that it had information that he participated in the Gardner robbery, and that if he returned the paintings they would let him go. He told the authorities he did not know who stole the paintings nor where they could be hidden. In his 2001 trial, he claimed entrapment, that the FBI let the Loomis Fargo plot proceed so they could pressure him for information about the Gardner paintings. The jury found him guilty, and he was sent to prison. Turner knew Gentile through Guarente; in 2010 Turner wrote a letter to Gentile asking him to call Turner's former girlfriend to help recover the Gardner paintings. In cooperation with the FBI, Gentile spoke with Turner's girlfriend, who said Turner wanted him to speak with two ex-convict friends in Boston. The FBI wanted Gentile to meet the men and send an FBI undercover agent with him, but Gentile did not want to cooperate further. Turner was freed in November 2019, one month after Rossetti. Merlino died in prison in 2005.

=== Bobby Donati ===
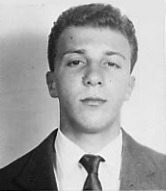
Bobby Donati in an undated photo

Criminal Bobby Donati was murdered in 1991 in the midst of a gang war within the Patriarca crime family. His involvement in the Gardner theft was suspected after New England art thief Myles J. Connor Jr. spoke with authorities. Connor was in jail at the time of the heist, but he believed Donati and criminal David Houghton were the masterminds. Connor worked with Donati in past art heists and claimed the two cased the Gardner Museum where Donati took interest in the finial. Connor also claimed that Houghton visited him in jail after the heist and said that he and Donati organized it and would use the paintings to get Connor out of jail. If this is true, they likely borrowed the idea from Connor as he returned art to reduce sentences in the past. Even though Donati's and Houghton's appearances did not fit the witness descriptions, Connor suggested they probably hired lower-level gangsters to carry out the robbery. Like Donati, Houghton also died within two years of the robbery, though from illness rather than murder. Connor told investigators he could assist in returning the Gardner works in exchange for the museum's posted reward and his freedom. When investigators did not give in to Connor's demands because of lack of evidence, he suggested they speak with criminal and antiques dealer William P. Youngworth.

Acting on Connor's lead, the FBI opened a case on Youngworth and raided his home and antique store properties in the 1990s. The raids caught the attention of journalist Tom Mashberg, who began talking with Youngworth in 1997 about the theft. One night in August 1997, Youngworth called Mashberg and told him he had proof he could return the Gardner paintings under the right conditions. That night, Youngworth picked up Mashberg from the Boston Herald offices and drove him to a warehouse in Red Hook, Brooklyn. Youngworth led him inside to a storage unit with several large cylinder tubes. He removed one painting from its tube, unfurled it, and showed it to Mashberg under flashlight. It appeared to Mashberg to be The Storm on the Sea of Galilee. He noticed cracking along the canvas, and the edges were cut in a manner consistent with museum reports, and he noticed Rembrandt's signature on the ship's rudder. Mashberg wrote about his experience in the Boston Herald, omitting details to hide Youngworth's identity and the painting's location. He reported that his "informant" (presumably Youngworth) told him the robbery was pulled off by five men and identified two: Donati was one robber, and Houghton was responsible for moving the art to a safe house. The FBI discovered the location of the warehouse several months later and raided it, finding nothing.

The veracity of Youngworth's claims and authenticity of the painting shown to Mashberg is disputed. Youngworth supplied paint chips to Mashberg, which federal authorities reported were indeed from Rembrandt's era but did not match oils used for The Storm on the Sea of Galilee. The way Mashberg described the painting as being "unfurled" was also scrutinized, as the stolen painting was covered with a heavy varnish that would not roll easily. Federal authorities and the museum began working with Youngworth after Mashberg's story was published, but Youngworth made negotiations difficult. He would not work with authorities unless his demands were met, which included full immunity and Connor's release from jail. The authorities were skeptical of Youngworth's veracity and only offered partial immunity. The United States attorney overseeing the case eventually ceased talks with Youngworth unless he could provide more reliable evidence that he had access to the Gardner works. Youngworth again provided a vial of paint chips, purportedly from The Storm on the Sea of Galilee, and 25 color photographs of the painting and A Lady and Gentleman in Black. A joint statement from the museum and federal investigators announced that the chips were not from the stolen Rembrandts, though they did test as being from 17th century paintings and could potentially be from The Concert.

In 2014, investigative reporter Stephen Kurkjian wrote to gangster Vincent Ferrara, Donati's superior during the gang war, inquiring if he had information about the Gardner theft. He received a call back from an associate of Ferrara who explained the FBI was wrong in suspecting the Merlino gang's involvement and claimed that Donati organized the robbery. The caller explained that Donati visited Ferrara in jail about three months before the theft, after the latter was charged with murder, and told Ferrara that he would do something to get him out of jail. Three months later, Ferrara heard news about the Gardner theft, after which Donati visited him again and confirmed to Ferrara that he was involved in the robbery. He claimed to have buried the artwork and would start a negotiation for his release once the investigation cooled down. The negotiations never occurred because Donati was murdered. Kurkjian believes Donati was motivated to free Ferrara from prison because Ferrara could protect him in the gang war. A friend of Guarente also corroborated that Donati organized the robbery, and that Donati gave paintings to Guarente when he became concerned for his own safety. Donati was close friends with Guarente. The two were seen at a social club in Revere shortly before the robbery with a bag of police uniforms.

== General and cited references ==
- Boser, Ulrich (2009). The Gardner Heist: The True Story of the World's Largest Unsolved Art Theft. New York: HarperCollins. ISBN 978-0-06-145184-3.
- Goldfarb, Hilliard T. (1995). The Isabella Stewart Gardner Museum: A Companion Guide and History. New Haven, Connecticut: Yale University. ISBN 0-300-06341-5.
- Isabella Stewart Gardner Museum (2018). Stolen. Carlisle, Massachusetts: Benna Books. ISBN 978-1-944038-52-6.
- Kurkjian, Stephen (2015). Master Thieves: The Boston Gangsters Who Pulled Off the World's Greatest Art Heist (2016 ed.). New York: PublicAffairs. ISBN 978-1-61039-632-5.
- McShane, Thomas; Matera, Dary (2006). Stolen Masterpiece Tracker. Fort Lee, New Jersey: Barricade Books. ISBN 1-56980-314-5.
- Wittman, Robert K.; Shiffman, John (2010). Priceless: How I Went Undercover to Rescue the World's Stolen Treasures. New York: Broadway Books. ISBN 978-0-307-46148-3.
