= Chez Tortoni =

Stolen painting by Édouard Manet

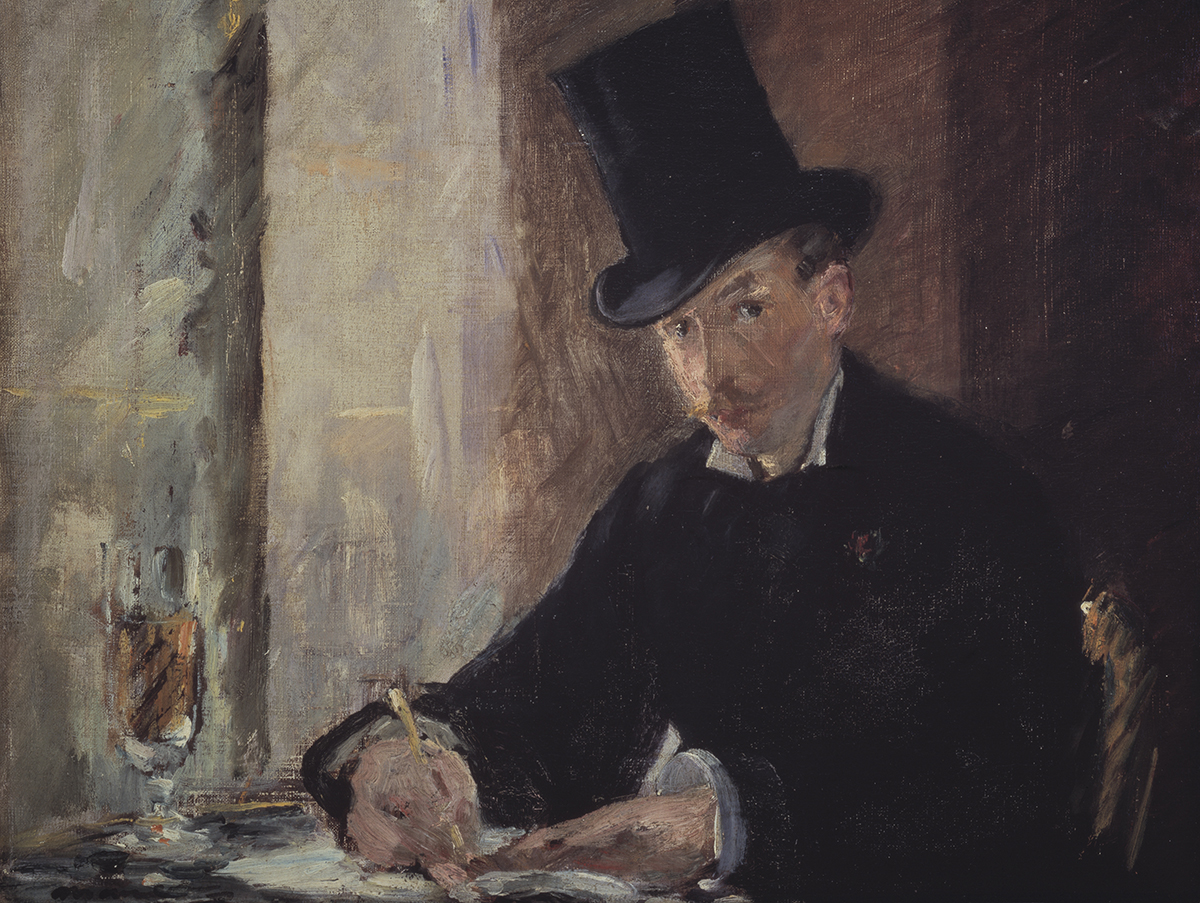
- Artist: Édouard Manet
- Year: c. 1875
- Medium: Oil on canvas
- Dimensions: 26 cm × 34 cm (10 in × 13 in)
- Location: Whereabouts unknown since the Isabella Stewart Gardner Museum theft in 1990

Chez Tortoni is a painting by the French artist Édouard Manet, painted ca. 1875. The oil-on-canvas painting measures 26 by 34 centimetres (10 in × 13 in). The painting hung in the Isabella Stewart Gardner Museum of Boston, Massachusetts, United States prior to its theft in 1990 and it has not yet been recovered. A $10 million reward is offered for the return of Chez Tortoni and the other stolen items.

== Description ==
The painting depicts an unidentified gentleman sitting at a table in the Café Tortoni de Paris while drawing on a sketchpad. A half-empty glass of beer stands on the table.

== In popular culture ==
The painting was featured in a background scene in season 3, episode 1 ("The Birthday") of The Vampire Diaries. It also appeared in season 3, episodes 3 and 5 of the French Netflix series Lupin. It also appeared in L'Art du crime, season 6, episodes 1 and 2, "La nouvelle Olympia". A description of the painting and its theft were discussed in the opening of Darknet Diaries episode 147, "Tornado", by Jack Rhysider.

== See also ==
- List of paintings by Édouard Manet
- List of stolen paintings
