= The Storm on the Sea of Galilee =

Stolen 1633 painting by Rembrandt

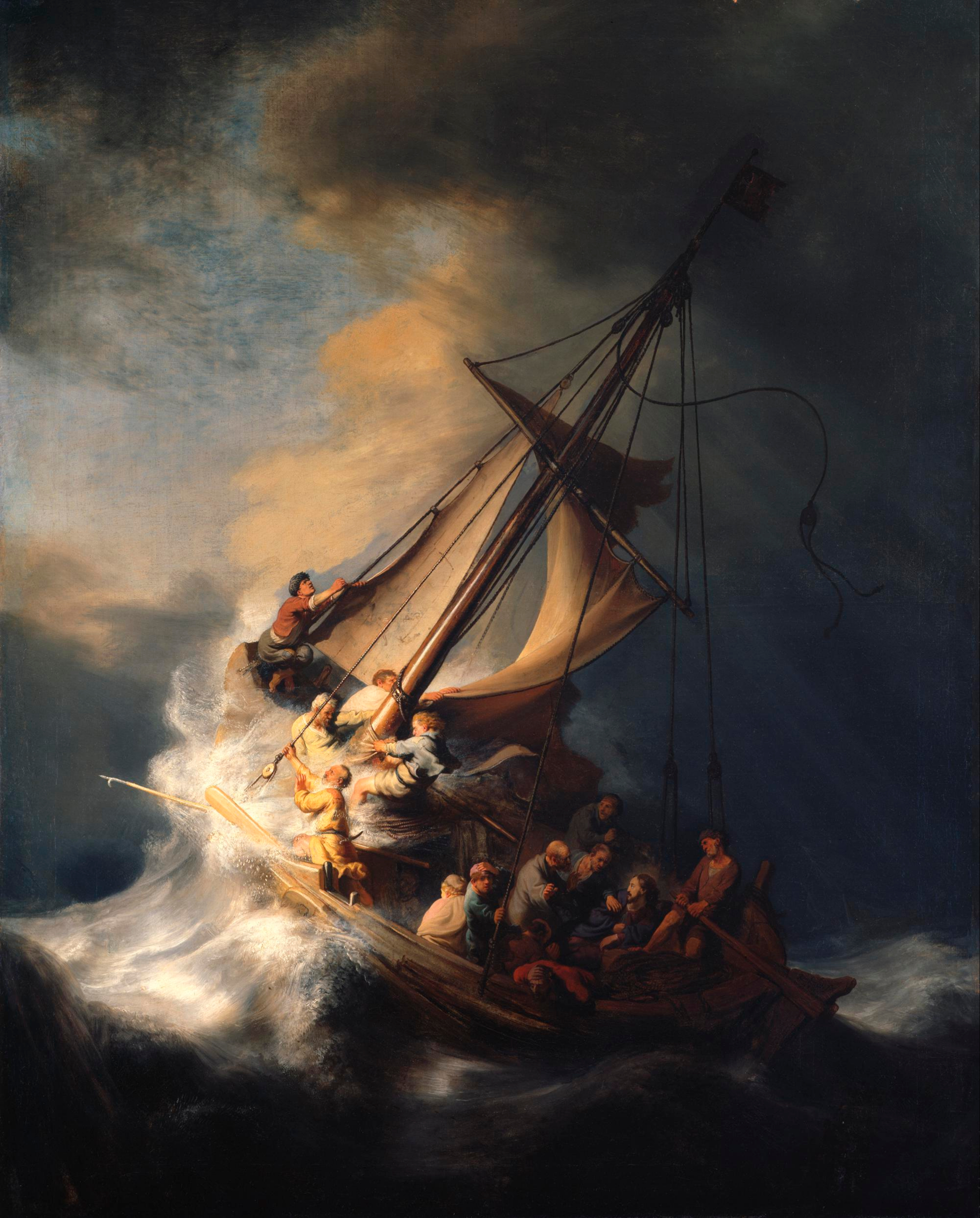
- Artist: Rembrandt van Rijn
- Year: 1633
- Medium: Oil on canvas
- Movement: Dutch Golden Age painting
- Dimensions: 160 cm × 128 cm (63.00 in × 50.39 in)
- Location: Whereabouts unknown since 1990

Christ in the Storm on the Sea of Galilee is a 1633 oil-on-canvas painting by the Dutch Golden Age painter Rembrandt van Rijn. A history painting, it ranks among the largest and earliest of Rembrandt's works. It vividly portrays the biblical miracle in which Jesus calmed the storm on the Sea of Galilee. It is Rembrandt's only known seascape.

Purchased in 1898, the painting was displayed at the Isabella Stewart Gardner Museum in Boston until its theft in 1990; its whereabouts remain unknown.

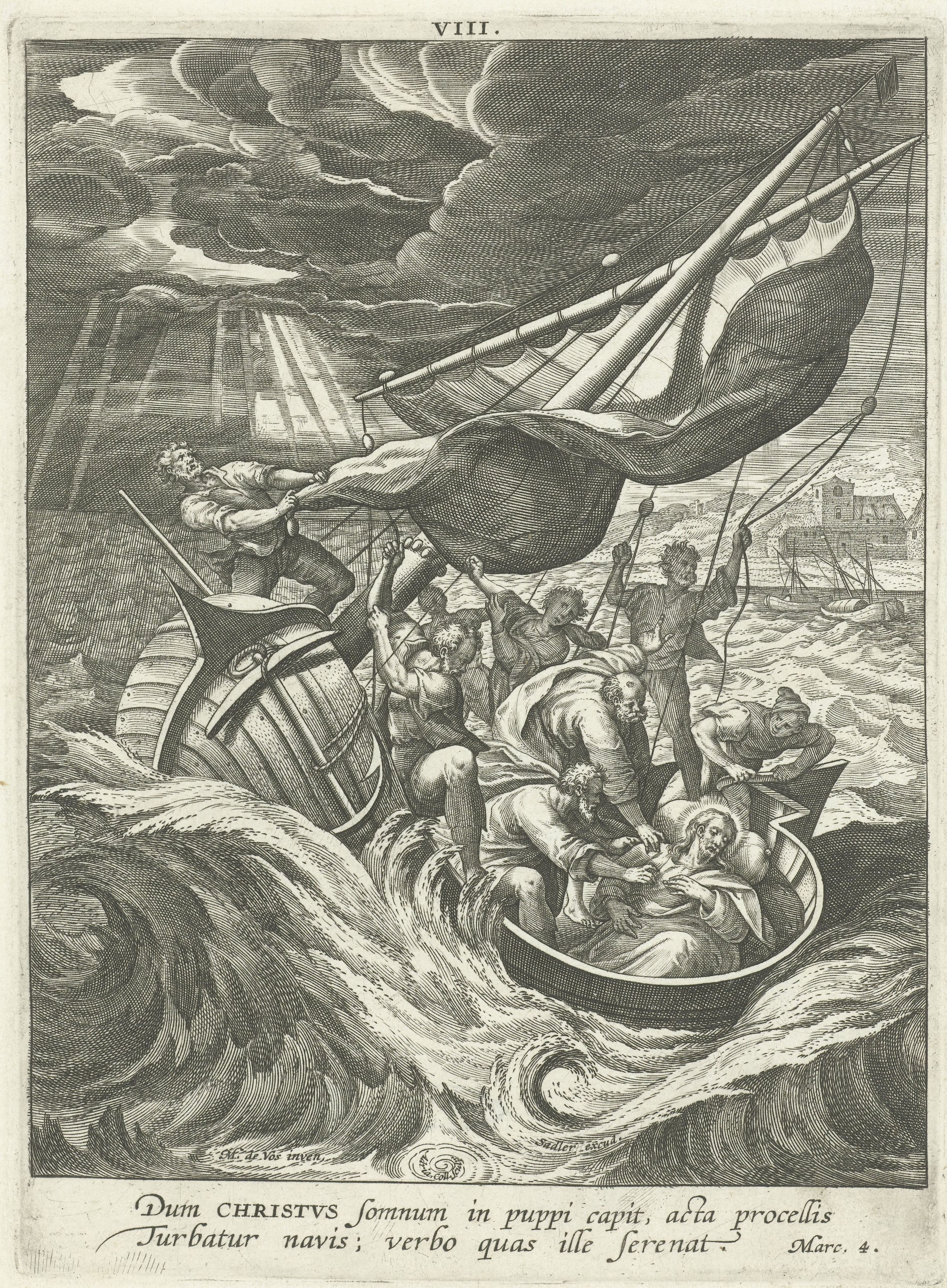
Storm op het Meer van Galilea Leven van Christus, print by Adriaen Collaert after a design by Maerten de Vos

== Description ==
The painting, executed in a vertical format, presents a dramatic close-up of Christ's disciples battling a ferocious storm to regain control of their fishing boat. A towering wave crashes against the bow, shredding the sail, while one disciple is depicted vomiting over the side, overwhelmed by the tempest. Another, gazing directly at the viewer, is a self-portrait of Rembrandt himself—a signature touch linking the artist to the narrative. In stark contrast, Christ remains serene on the right, his calm presence a focal point amid the chaos.

This depiction aligns closely with the biblical account in Luke 8:22–25, where the disciples, gripped by fear during a sudden squall, wake Jesus, who then stills the storm. Rembrandt’s rendition is praised for its fidelity to the scriptural description, particularly in its emotional intensity and dynamic composition. The lowered perspective amplifies the sky’s dominance over the sea, yet the boat and its occupants remain the central focus. The vessel resembles a hoeker, a common North Sea fishing boat, though Rembrandt modified its hull for asymmetry and thickened the mast, departing from the typical square or triangular sail to enhance the scene’s drama. Art historian Christian Tümpel observed that Rembrandt drew inspiration from earlier Bible illustrations, adapting props like the ship to suit his imaginative vision rather than adhering strictly to nautical accuracy.

Rembrandt’s use of tenebrism—marked by stark contrasts between light and shadow—heightens the miraculous nature of Christ’s intervention. Light streams from the upper left, piercing the stormy gloom and illuminating a patch of blue sky, while the right side plunges into shadow, emphasizing the disciples’ peril. The composition echoes an Adriaen Collaert print from the 1583 Vita, passio et Resvrrectio Iesv Christ series, designed by Maerten de Vos and published by the Sadeler family. Rembrandt adopts the print’s vertical orientation and forward-tilting boat, amplifying the sense of urgency and spatial tension.

== History ==
Classified as a history painting, Christ in the Storm on the Sea of Galilee measures approximately 160 x 128 cm and represents Rembrandt’s earliest large-scale work, completed at age 27 (not 29, adjusting for his birth year of 1606). Painted during his transition from Leiden to Amsterdam, it reflects his burgeoning mastery of dramatic storytelling. No record confirms whether it was a commission, leaving its original purpose speculative. That same year, Rembrandt sketched Christ Walking on the Waves, inspired by Matthew 14:22–33, where Jesus walks on water and rescues a faltering Peter—an event thematically linked to the storm scene. This dual exploration of Christ’s maritime miracles underscores Rembrandt’s early fascination with biblical seascapes.

The painting’s singularity as Rembrandt’s only seascape aligns it with the evolving Dutch artistic landscape, yet its focus on a religious narrative sets it apart from the secular maritime scenes then gaining traction. Its execution in 1633 places it at a pivotal moment in Rembrandt’s career, as he established his reputation in Amsterdam following his apprenticeship under Pieter Lastman, a master of history painting whose influence is evident in the work’s theatricality.

The painting was purchased by art historian Bernard Berenson for Isabella Stewart Gardner in 1898, not 1869 as previously noted, correcting an error based on historical records. It was displayed at the Isabella Stewart Gardner Museum in Boston until its theft in 1990.

== Dutch seascape ==
Dutch seascapes emerged as a prominent genre in the early 17th century, reflecting shifts in artistic priorities and societal dynamics. Vertical perspectives and religious themes gave way to lower horizons, greater depth, and naturalistic portrayals of the sea. Scholar Allan Sekula ties this evolution to four factors: expanding maritime trade, naval conflicts, advancements in cartography and navigation, and the integration of political and seafaring motifs into art. Following the Eighty Years' War, the Netherlands rose as a naval power, bolstered by the Dutch West India Company and Dutch East India Company, which fueled interest in seascapes depicting battles, ship portraits, and atmospheric sea views—often infused with religious undertones, as in Rembrandt’s work.

Hendrick Cornelisz Vroom, a pioneer of the genre, laid the groundwork for its popularity, which later spread across Europe and America. Rembrandt’s seascape, though unique in his catalog, engages with this tradition through its detailed ship and tumultuous sea, blending Dutch realism with his distinctive narrative flair.

== Provenance ==
The painting's earliest known owner was Tymen Jacobsz Hinloopen, a prominent Dutch merchant and whaling company leader, who acquired it in 1644 under the title A Painting of St. Peter's Ship. It passed through several hands before reaching Henry Francis Pelham-Clinton-Hope, who sold it in 1898 to art dealers Asher Wertheimer and P. & D. Colnaghi & Co. That year, Bernard Berenson negotiated its purchase for Isabella Stewart Gardner for $6,000 (approximately equivalent to $232,200 in 2025). Berenson, a key figure in Gardner's collecting endeavors, had previously facilitated acquisitions like Titian's The Rape of Europa in 1896, cementing their collaboration.

At the Gardner Museum, the painting joined masterpieces like a Rembrandt self-portrait and Vermeer's The Concert in the Dutch Room, where it remained until its theft. Its journey from Hinlopen's collection to Gardner's reflects its enduring value across centuries.

== Theft ==
On March 18, 1990, two thieves posing as police officers infiltrated the Isabella Stewart Gardner Museum, overpowering guards and stealing Christ in the Storm on the Sea of Galilee along with 12 other artworks—valued collectively at over $500 million—in the largest art heist in U.S. history. The thieves slashed the canvas from its stretcher with a blade, likely rolling it up despite the risk of damaging its brittle paint surface. On March 18, 2013, the FBI announced it had identified the perpetrators, though their names remain undisclosed, and no arrests have followed. Theories suggest involvement by organized crime, possibly the Boston mob.

The museum offers a $10 million reward for information leading to the recovery of the stolen works, and empty frames hang in the Dutch Room as a poignant reminder of the loss. The case remains unsolved, with ongoing speculation about the painting's fate—whether it resides in a private collection, a criminal stash, or has been irreparably lost.

== In popular culture ==
Christ in the Storm on the Sea of Galilee has appeared many times in popular media, often symbolizing mystery due to its theft. Some notable examples include:

- It is used as the cover of Peter L. Bernstein's 1996 book Against the Gods: The Remarkable Story of Risk.
- In the animated series The Venture Bros., the villain Phantom Limb is depicted trying to sell the painting (Season 2, Episode 6, 2006).
- It serves as the artwork for the album The Struggle (2012) by the contemporary Christian band Tenth Avenue North.
- It appears twice in the crime thriller series The Blacklist. First in the 2013 episode "Gina Zanetakos (No. 152)" (Season 1, Episode 6), where Raymond Reddington brokers its sale, and again as a forgery in the 2017 episode "Greyson Blaise (No. 37)" (Season 5, Episode 2).
- The 2013 film Trance, directed by Danny Boyle, centers on the painting's theft, spotlighting Rembrandt's self-portrait within it.
- It appears in Harold Meachum's building in Iron Fist (Season 1, Episode 1, 2017).
- In 2019, artist Giovanni DeCunto reinterpreted the stolen Gardner works, exhibiting them publicly.
- A forgery of the painting drives the plot of the pilot for the crime series Leverage: Redemption (2021–2025).
- It hangs in series antagonist Terry Silver's living room in the Season 5 finale of Cobra Kai (2022).
- It can be seen in the dining room of Louis de Pointe du Lac’s Dubai apartment in Interview with the Vampire (Season 1, Episode 2, 2022).
- An animated version was displayed at the Frameless Immersive Art Experience in London in 2024.
- It briefly appears in Nobody 2 (2025) in the antagonist Lendina's warehouse, where it is presumably destroyed through the events of the movie.
- It hangs behind Father Jud's desk in Wake Up Dead Man (2025).
- It is among Arnand's stolen art collection in Ride or Die (2026).
- It appears in the Duke's collection of stolen artworks in the series Berlin and the Lady with an Ermine (Season 2, Episode 8, 2026).

== See also ==
- List of stolen paintings
- List of paintings by Rembrandt
