= PGIA =

PGIA may refer to:

- N,N'-diacetylbacillosaminyl-diphospho-undecaprenol alpha-1,3-N-acetylgalactosaminyltransferase, an enzyme
- Postgraduate Institute of Agriculture
- Philip S. W. Goldson International Airport, the primary airport of Belize, often abbreviated as "PGIA".
