= Postgraduate (disambiguation) =

Postgraduate may refer to:

1. Postgraduate education- studies after the bachelor's degree level;
2. Postgraduate diploma
3. Postgraduate Certificate in Education- one- or two-year higher education course in England, Wales and Northern Ireland
4. Postgraduate training in general dentistry
5. Postgraduate certificate
6. Postgraduate Certificate in Laws
7. Postgraduate Certificate Program in Art Crime and Cultural Heritage Protection
8. Postgraduate Medical Journal- journal
9. Postgraduate Medical Education and Training Board
10. Postgraduate Institute of Medical Education and Research-research center in Chandigarh, India;
11. Postgraduate training in general dentistry in the United States
12. Postgraduate research- university area of study after a Master's or PhD
13. Postgraduate Institute of Agriculture
14. Postgraduate Medicine
15. Postgraduate Certificate in Higher Education
