= Art and Crime =

Art & Crime: Exploring the Dark Side of the Art World is a collection of essays edited by art historian and writer Noah Charney, published in 2009 by Praeger Press. The collection includes essays by professors, lawyers, police, security directors, archaeologists, art historians, and members of the art trade, on the subject of art crime (including theft and forgery) and protection of cultural heritage. It was the first book published under the auspices of ARCA (The Association for Research into Crimes against Art), an international non-profit think tank and research group which studies art crime. All profits from the sale of this book go directly to support ARCA's charitable activities in defense of art.

== Summary ==
Art crime has received relatively little scholarly attention. And yet it involves a multibillion-dollar legitimate industry, with a conservatively-estimated $6 billion annual criminal profit. (US Department of Justice website) Information and scholarly analysis of art crime is critical to the wide variety of fields involved in the art trade and art preservation, from museums to academia, from auction houses to galleries, from insurance to art law, from policing to security. Since the Second World War, art crime has evolved from a relatively innocuous crime, into the third highest-grossing annual criminal trade worldwide, run primarily by organized crime syndicates, and therefore funding their other enterprises, from the drug and arms trades to terrorism. It is no longer merely the art that is at stake.

The book is an interdisciplinary essay collection on the study of art crime, and its effect on all aspects of the art world. Essayists discuss art crime subcategories, including vandalism, iconoclasm, forgery, fraud, peacetime theft, war looting, archaeological looting, smuggling, submarine looting, and ransom. The contributors conclude their analyses with specific practical suggestions to implement in the future.

== Essays ==
Author	Essay	Subject / notes
Noah Charney	Introduction to Art & Crime & Art Crime in Context	Introduction to the book
Derek Fincham	The Fundamental Importance of Archaeological Context	Importance of protecting archaeological sites from looters
David Gill	Homecomings: Learning from the Return of Antiquities to Italy	Italy's pursuit of its artifacts from collections around the world
Toby Bull	Lack of Due Diligence & Unregulated Markets: Trade in Illicit Antiquities & Fakes in Hong Kong, China	Art crime in China and the Hong Kong art market
A. J. G. Tijhuis	Who Is Stealing All Those Paintings?	Criminological categorization of art thieves
Silvia Loreti	The Affair of the Statuettes Re-Examined: Picasso & Apollinaire's Role in the Famed Louvre Theft	The theft of Mona Lisa, and Guillaume Apollinaire and Pablo Picasso's roles in thefts from the Louvre, Paris
Bojan Dobovšek	Art, Terrorism & Organized Crime	Balkan organised crime
Kenneth Polk and Duncan Chappell	Fakes and Deception: Examining Fraud in the Art Market	The criminal justice system's attitude to art crime
Dorit Straus	Implication of Art Theft in the Fine Art Insurance Industry	Inner workings of the insurance industry
Judah Best	Trepidations of a Private Art Collector	The risks to the private collector of art
Colonel Giovanni Pastore	Defending Art	Italian police officer, head of Carabinieri Division for the Protection of Cultural Heritage on his career
Dennis Ahern & Anthony Amore	Q&A with Two Revolutionary Security Directors	The security directors of the Tate Galleries and Isabella Stewart Gardner Museum
Stevan P. Layne	Exercises in Futility: The Pursuit of Protecting Art	Advice on museum security
Dick Drent	Exhibition Security: Regular, Customized or Tailor Fit.	Security approach in Van Gogh Museum in Amsterdam
Travis McDade	The Quiet Crime: An Introduction to the World of Rare Book, Map and Document Theft	Map and rare book thefts
John Kleberg	Unexpected and Accessible: Threats to University Collections	University art collections
Richard Oram & Ann Hartley	Bringing It All Back Home: Recovery of Stolen Special Collections Materials	Recovery in high-profile cases
Judge Arthur Tompkins	Art Theft: Heralds of Change in the International Legal Landscape.	Legal analysis focussing on theft of maps from Museo del Prado in Spain
Dafydd Nelson	Economic Woe, Art Theft and Money Laundering – A Perfect Recipe	How to regulate the world art trade
Erik Nemeth	The Artifacts of Wartime Art Crime: Evidence for a Model of the Evolving Clout of Cultural Property in Foreign Affairs	Wartime looting
John Stubbs	Why Masterpieces Matter: Some Dogmatic Reflections	Conclusion reflecting on the importance of art
