= Undecaprenyl phosphate N,N'-diacetylbacillosamine 1-phosphate transferase =

Class of enzymes

Identifiers
- EC no.: 2.7.8.36

Databases
- IntEnz: IntEnz view
- BRENDA: BRENDA entry
- ExPASy: NiceZyme view
- KEGG: KEGG entry
- MetaCyc: metabolic pathway
- PRIAM: profile
- PDB structures: RCSB PDB PDBe PDBsum
Search
- PMC: articles
- PubMed: articles
- NCBI: proteins

Phosphoglycosyl transferase C (from Campylobacter jejuni)

Identifiers
- Organism: Campylobacter jejuni
- Symbol: PglC
- Entrez: 905415
- PDB: 5W7L
- RefSeq (Prot): WP_251831164.1
- UniProt: Q0P9D0
Search for
- Structures: Swiss-model
- Domains: InterPro

Phosphoglycosyl transferase C (PglC) is an enzyme belonging to a class known as monotopic phosphoglycosyl transferases (PGT). PGTs are required for the synthesis of glycoconjugates on the membrane surface of bacteria. Glycoconjugates, such as glycoproteins, are imperative for bacterial communication as well as host cell interactions between prokaryotic and eukaryotic cells lending to bacteria's pathogenicity.

== Background ==
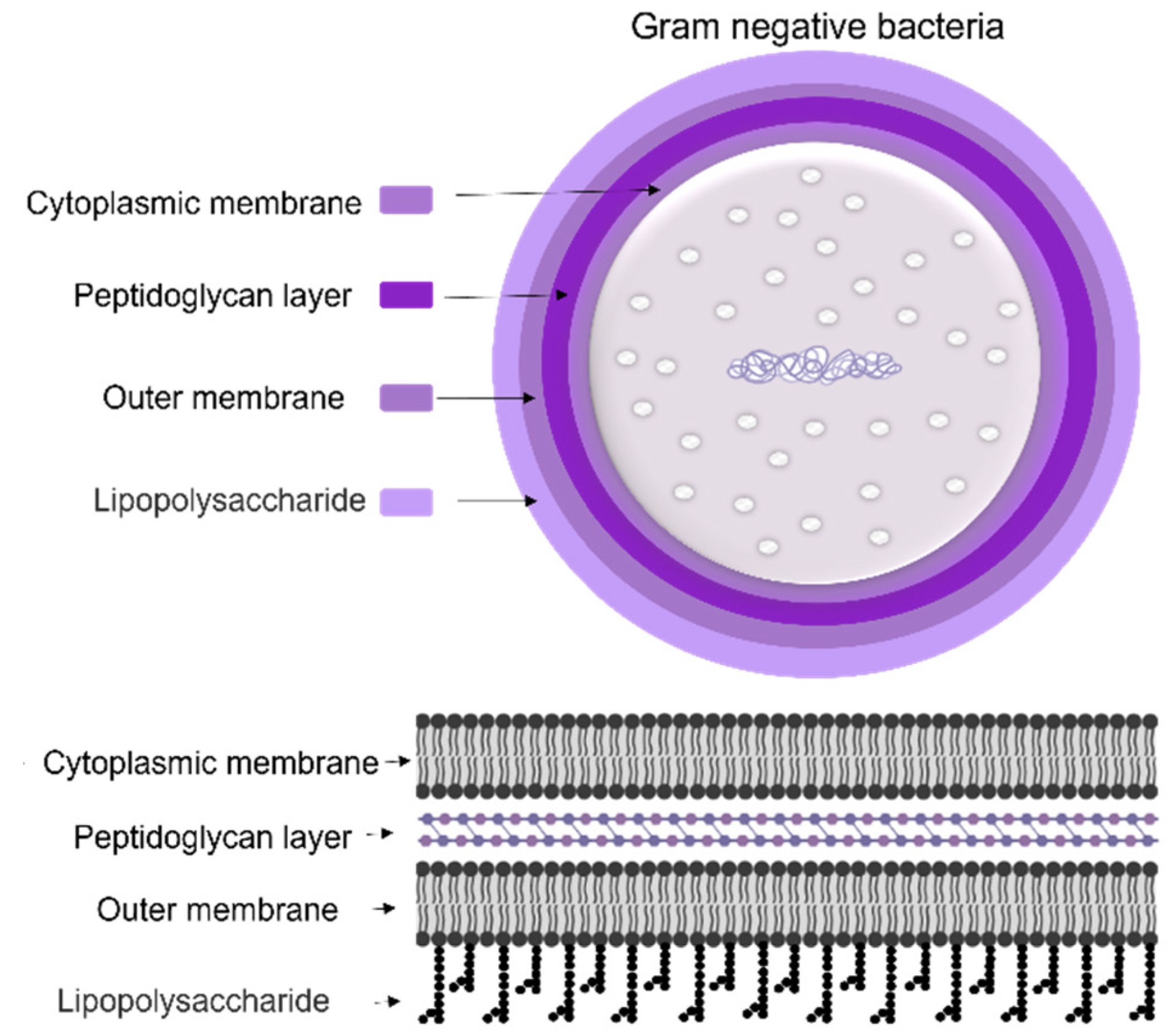
Depiction of the gram-negative cell wall consisting of an outer membrane of LPS, a middle layer of peptidoglycan, and an inner plasma membrane.

PglC is found in the pathogenic gram-negative organism Campylobacter jejuni (C. jejuni). Infection from C. jejuni results in acute gastroenteritis followed by vomiting, diarrhea, fever and abdominal pain. The most common route of infection is through undercooked poultry as birds are a common source of C. jejuni. Recent studies have also shown an association between prior C. jejuni infection and the neurological syndrome Guillan-Barré. The glycoconjugates, lipopolysaccharides (LPS), found in the membrane of the bacteria resemble gangliosides found in the human nervous system leading to the generation of autoantibodies which cause deterioration of neurons. Gangliosides can be found on neuronal cells and are membrane proteins that aid in cell-cell recognition and communication.

PglC belongs to a superfamily of enzymes known as monotopic phosphoglycsoyl transferases (monoPGT). These membrane-associated proteins catalyze the transfer of a phosphosugar from a soluble nucleoside diphosphate-activated donor to a polyprenol phosphate (Pren-P) acceptor within the membrane. The product is then diversified via action of glycosyl transferases, to build a lipid linked oligosaccharide that will be flipped to the periplasm and form a glycoconjugate. Mono PGTs are unique to prokaryotes and essential for the production of glycoconjugates which mediate cell-host interactions during bacterial infections and are thus important for bacterial survival and pathogenicity.

Glycoconjugates are integral structures on the surface of cell membranes composed of carbohydrates linked to other biomolecules such as proteins or lipids. These structures serve as a shield to the environment as well as aid in pathogenesis and viability of the bacterium itself. Glycoconjugates are also known to comprise adhesins used for host colonization and invasion. C. jejuni utilizes adhesins to attach to the epithelial cells of the gastrointestinal tract of humans allowing for colonization and infection of the human host. Eukaryotic cells exhibit their own glycoconjugate ecosystem lending to immune system recognition of human cells as "self". Bacteria utilize glycan mimicry to pose as eukaryotic cells and evade immune response. Several studies have shown that inactivated genes linked to glycan synthesis result in an inability of bacteria to adhere to host cells thereby inhibiting colonization of the host.

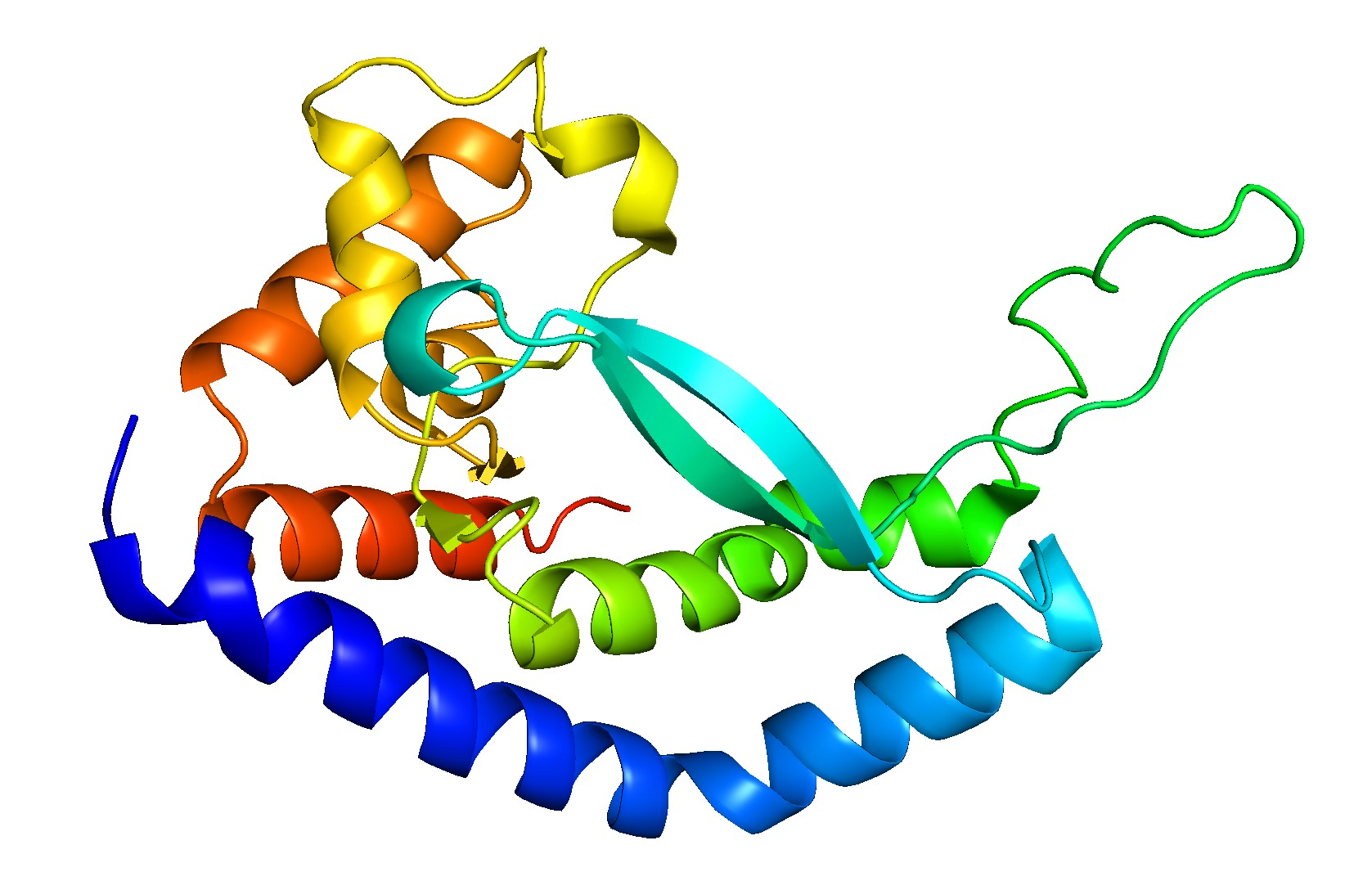
Structure of the protein PglC from Campylobacter concisus. Based on PyMol rendering of PDB 5W7L.

== Structure ==
PglC is a membrane protein which only enters the first leaflet of the membrane on the cytosolic side of the lipid membrane interface. That is, the protein only sits in the first layer of the double-layered membrane. PglC from Campylobacter jejuni has yet to be structurally characterized, but an orthologue of PglC from Campylobacter concisus was elucidated in 2018 that represents the minimal functional core of this class of proteins. Primary structure and hidden markov model computational analysis had actually predicted PglC to be a bitopic membrane protein. A bitopic membrane protein is one that passes through both layers of the membrane, but only does so once. However, structural characterization revealed that PglC only pans the first leaflet of the membrane. The structure also revealed significant characteristics of the protein important to its function such as the reentrant membrane helix (blue/light blue) that dips into the first leaflet of the membrane as well as the highly conserved Asp-Glu catalytic dyad within the active site (green loop). The active site also holds a phosphate binding site and Mg^{2+} cofactor site important for coordinating reaction chemistry. The other helices exist at the membrane interface (red, green, orange).

== Enzyme superfamily ==
Membrane proteins exist in three topologies: polytopic, bitopic, and monotopic, depending on the distribution of their domains throughout the membrane. The domains of polytopic proteins cross the membrane multiple times while bitopic proteins may only pass through the membrane once typically with a transmembrane helix connecting two soluble domains outside of the membrane. Monotopic membranes make up the smallest percentage of membrane proteins (0.06%) and are embedded in a single layer of the membrane, not both. While the topologies of bitopic and polytopic membrane proteins can be linked to their function, monotopic proteins' topologies have yet to inform any function of these unique proteins apart from commonly being found in pathways where several enzymes are localized in sequence within the membrane.

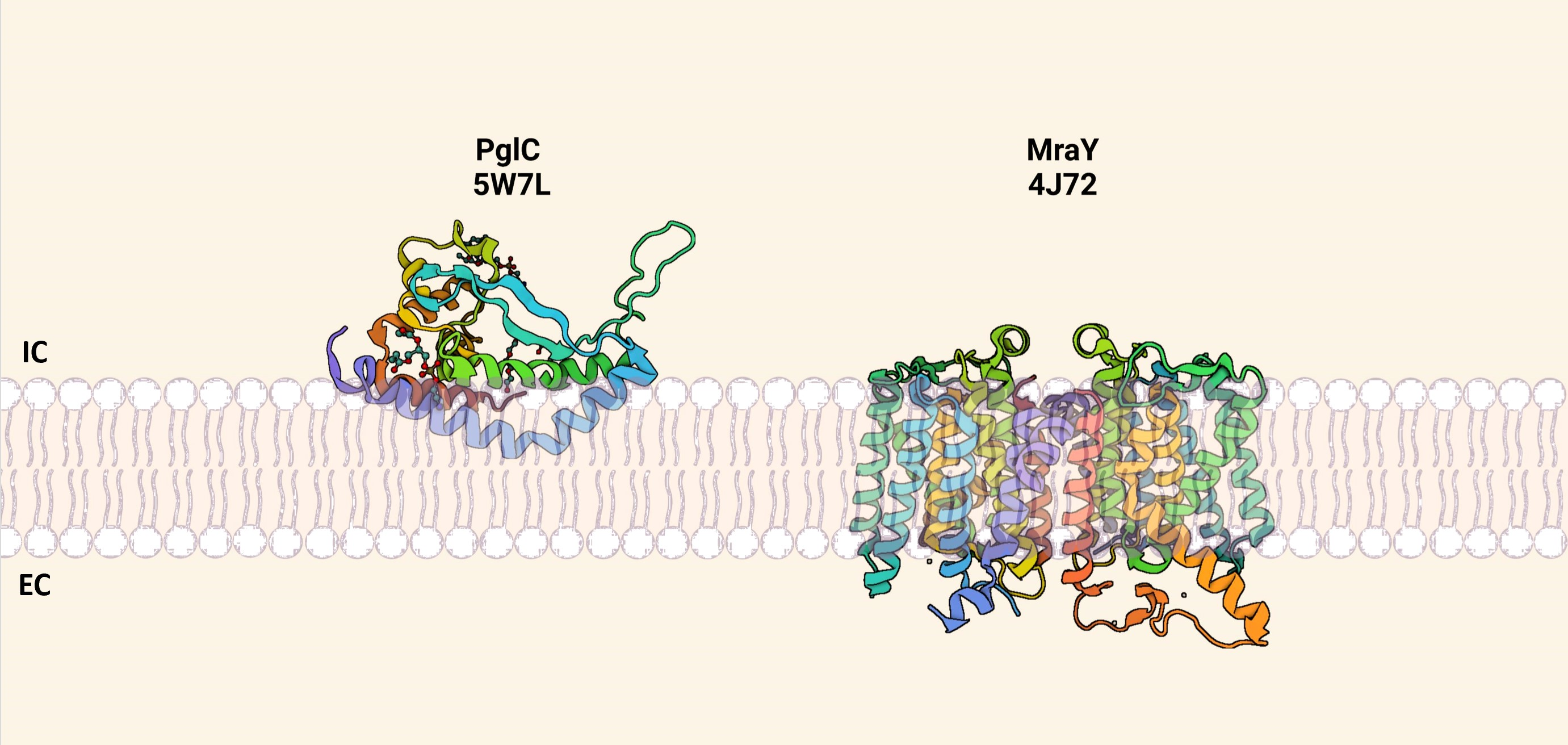
Depiction of how a monotopic membrane protein, PglC, differs in membrane topology compared to a polytopic protein, MraY.

PglC is the first structurally characterized member of the monotopic PGT superfamily. Other PGT superfamilies include the polytopic PGTs which are commonly exemplified by the proteins MraY and WecA. Although the three PGTs share the same function, they differ in structure and mechanism. PglC features a reentrant membrane helix that only spans the first leaflet of the membrane while MraY has multiple transmembrane helices. The mechanisms by which the two superfamilies' catalyze addition of an NDP-sugar (nucleoside di-phosphate) to a polyprenol acceptor within the membrane are unique. PglC utilizes a two-step ping pong mechanism that generates a covalent intermediate which is then available for nucleophilic attack by the polyprenol acceptor within the membrane. MraY and other polytopic PGTs use a ternary complex mechanism whereby Pren-P and the NDP-sugar are reacted by enzyme within a single step.

== Function ==
PglC is involved in the first membrane-associated catalysis step involved in the synthesis of glycoconjugates in the bacterium Campylobacter jejuni. The substrate for PglC, UDP-di-N-acetyl-bacillosamine, is first synthesized in the cytosol by the enzymes PglD, PglE, and PglF. PglC is responsible for linking the sugar, di-N-acetyl-bacillosamine, to the polyprenol phosphate (pren-p) acceptor within the membrane. PglC is also unique compared to its successors in the pathway due to the attachment of a phosphosugar to pren-p. PglA, PglJ, PglH, PglI, PglK, PglB are known as glycosyltransferases and each add their own respective sugars to the growing glycan, but there is no addition of a phosphoryl group. The phosphoryl group is integral for initiation of the membrane-associated part of the pathway, otherwise no successive sugars can be added to the growing glycan.

== Mechanism ==
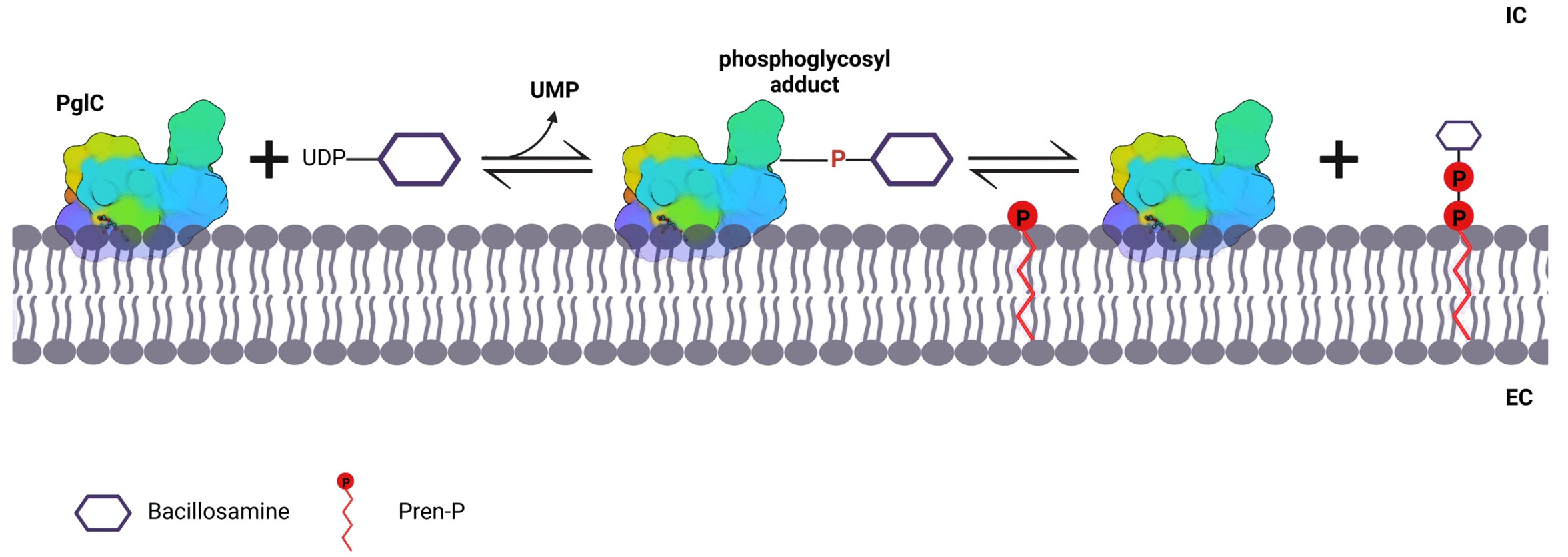

PglC catalyzes the generation of a polyprenol diphoshate-linked sugar (bacillosamine) via a ping pong mechanism. The AspGlu catalytic dyad of PglC acts as a nucleophile to attack UDP-bacillosamine, releasing UMP in the process (step 1). A covalent intermediate characteristic of a ping pong mechanism is formed between the enzyme and the sugar via the phosphate group. Polyprenol phosphate (Pren-P), a membrane substrate, attacks the covalent intermediate, or phosphoglycosyl adduct, resulting in turnover of enzyme and attachment of the sugar to the Pren-P acceptor within the membrane.
