= C6H14N2O3 =

Molecular formula

The molecular formula C_{6}H_{14}N_{2}O_{3} (molar mass: 162.19 g/mol) may refer to:

- Bacillosamine
- Hydroxylysine (Hyl)
