= Postgraduate Certificate Program in Art Crime and Cultural Heritage Protection =

ARCA's Postgraduate Certificate Program in Art Crime and Cultural Heritage Protection is a multidisciplinary postgraduate certificate program that specializes in the study of art crime and cultural property protection. The course programming consists of 10–11 weeks of academic instruction at the postgraduate level and is hosted in Amelia, Italy. The instruction covers a wide variety of theoretical and practical elements of art and heritage crime and examines art crime's interconnected world of art criminals, investigators, lawyers and art historians. The courses include comprehensive lectures and discussions exploring art crime, its nature and impact, as well as what is currently being done to mitigate it.

== Program ==
The program includes approximately 25 lecture hours per week of customized instruction over the course of one summer, for a total of approximately 250 contact hours with teaching professionals. This format allows students to complete the classroom portion of the program onsite, before writing their thesis remotely. ARCA selected this configuration to facilitate both student and allied professional enrollment, to ensure that both groups might undertake the program of study during one summer between academic advanced degrees or during a brief sabbatical or hiatus from work.

This program is currently being run under the auspices of the association and is considered a professional development program and not a master's degree program. While the courses comprising the Postgraduate Certificate Program may be used as evidence in support of a student's application for admission to a graduate degree program, the certificate itself is not considered to be a prerequisite, completing the program does not guarantee admission into a graduate study program. Prerequisites for this program require that applicants have completed an undergraduate degree by the start date of the program. The program has run each summer since 2009.

== Faculty ==
Recent instructors and lecturers have included:

- Dr. Stefano Alessandrini – Consultant to Il Ministero per i Beni Culturali e Ambientali
- Marc Balcells, Criminal Defence Attorney and Criminologist, Professor Universidad Miguel Hernandez de Elche, Consultant Universitat Oberta de Catalunya, Graduate Teaching Fellow at The City University of New York - John Jay College of Criminal Justice
- Dr. Noah Charney, Founding Director of ARCA and Adjunct Professor of Art History, American University of Rome
- Dr. Duncan Chappell, Lawyer and Criminologist, Adjunct Professor in the Faculty of Law at the University of Sydney, Conjoint Professor in the School of Psychiatry at the University of NSW,

Chair of the International Advisory Board of the Australian Research Council's Center of Excellence in Policing and Security, Former Director of the Australian Institute of Criminology (1987-1994)

- Dr. Crispin Corrado, academic director, adjunct professor and lecturer in archaeology and classics at the American University of Rome, John Cabot University, and The Catholic University of America
- Dick Drent, Museum Security Expert, Law Enforcement and National Security Expert, Director, Omnirisk, Associate Director, Holland Integrity Group, Corporate Security Manager, Van Gogh Museum, Amsterdam (retired)
- Richard Ellis, Director, Art Management Group and former Head Art and Antiques Squad Metropolitan Police, New Scotland Yard (retired)
- Dr. Tom Flynn, Art Historian and London Art Lecturer, Adjunct Assistant Professor, Richmond The American International University, Sr. Lecturer and Course Director, RICS-Accredited Art Market & Art Appraisal Kingston University, Lecturer, History of the Art Market, Art & Business, IESA/Wallace Collection
- Dr. Valerie Higgins, Associate Professor of Archaeology and Classics, Program Director, MA Programming in Sustainable Cultural Heritage at the American University of Rome
- Dr. Laurie Rush, Board Member, U.S. Committee of the Blue Shield
- Dorit Straus, Vice President and Worldwide Specialty Fine Art Manager for Chubb & Son, a division of Federal Insurance Company (retired), Insurance Industry Consultant, Art Recovery International
- Judge Arthur Tompkins, Forensic Expert, District Court Judge, New Zealand Ministry of Justice
- Dr. Christos Tsirogiannis Forensic Archaeologist, Illicit antiquities researcher, University of Cambridge, Research Assistant, Scottish Centre for Crime and Justice at Trafficking Culture University of Glasgow – Cambridge

Courses are supplemented with field classes and guest lecturers. Contingent on available funding, ARCA also invites distinguished novelists, journalists, and essayists to participate in ARCA's Writers-in-Residence program in year, held in conjunction with the Postgraduate Certificate Program.

Past Writers-in-Residence include: Christos Tsirogiannis Forensic Archaeologist, Illicit antiquities researcher: Dr. Susan Douglas, University of Guelph, Art History Department: Dr. Laurie Rush, who has assisted in training armed forces in safeguarding cultural heritage during armed conflict; Dr. Neil Brodie, noted archaeologist and researcher into the illicit antiquities trade; and Dr. Larry Rothfield, cofounder and former director of the Cultural Policy Center at the University of Chicago, and author of the book, The Rape of Mesopotamia, a detailed study of the looting of the Baghdad Museum and the protection of antiquities during conflict.
