= N,N'-diacetylbacillosaminyl-diphospho-undecaprenol alpha-1,3-N-acetylgalactosaminyltransferase =

Class of enzymes

Identifiers
- EC no.: 2.4.1.290

Databases
- IntEnz: IntEnz view
- BRENDA: BRENDA entry
- ExPASy: NiceZyme view
- KEGG: KEGG entry
- MetaCyc: metabolic pathway
- PRIAM: profile
- PDB structures: RCSB PDB PDBe PDBsum
Search
- PMC: articles
- PubMed: articles
- NCBI: proteins

N,N'-diacetylbacillosaminyl-diphospho-undecaprenol alpha-1,3-N-acetylgalactosaminyltransferase (EC 2.4.1.290, PglA) is an enzyme with systematic name UDP-N-acetyl-alpha-D-galactosamine:N,N'-diacetyl-alpha-D-bacillosaminyl-diphospho-tritrans,heptacis-undecaprenol 3-alpha-N-acetyl-D-galactosaminyltransferase. This enzyme catalyses the following chemical reaction

UDP-N-acetyl-alpha-D-galactosamine + N,N'-diacetyl-alpha-D-bacillosaminyl-diphospho-tritrans,heptacis-undecaprenol $\rightleftharpoons$ UDP + N-acetyl-D-galactosaminyl-alpha-(1->3)-N,N'-diacetyl-alpha-D-bacillosaminyl-diphospho-tritrans,heptacis-undecaprenol

This enzyme is isolated from Campylobacter jejuni. It is important for N-linked glycosylation in this species. The glycosyl motif that the enzymes encoded by the Pgl locus create consists of a bacillosamine joined to a GalNAc residue by an alpha 1–3 glycosidic bond, followed by four additional GalNAc residues linked by alpha 1–4 bonds. A branching glucose residue completes the heptasaccharide, joined by a beta 1–3 linkage to the third GalNAc residue from the amino acid linkage point. Glycosylation takes place on an undecaprenyl pyrophosphate on the cytosolic face of the plasma membrane, followed by flippase transfer to the periplasmic space and en bloc transfer to an asparagine residue.

This enzyme catalyzes the addition of GalNAc, covalently bonded to carrier uridine diphosphate (UDP), to isoprenoid lipid–linked bacillosamine, resulting in production of UDP and the glycosylated lipid.
