= Noah Charney =

American novelist

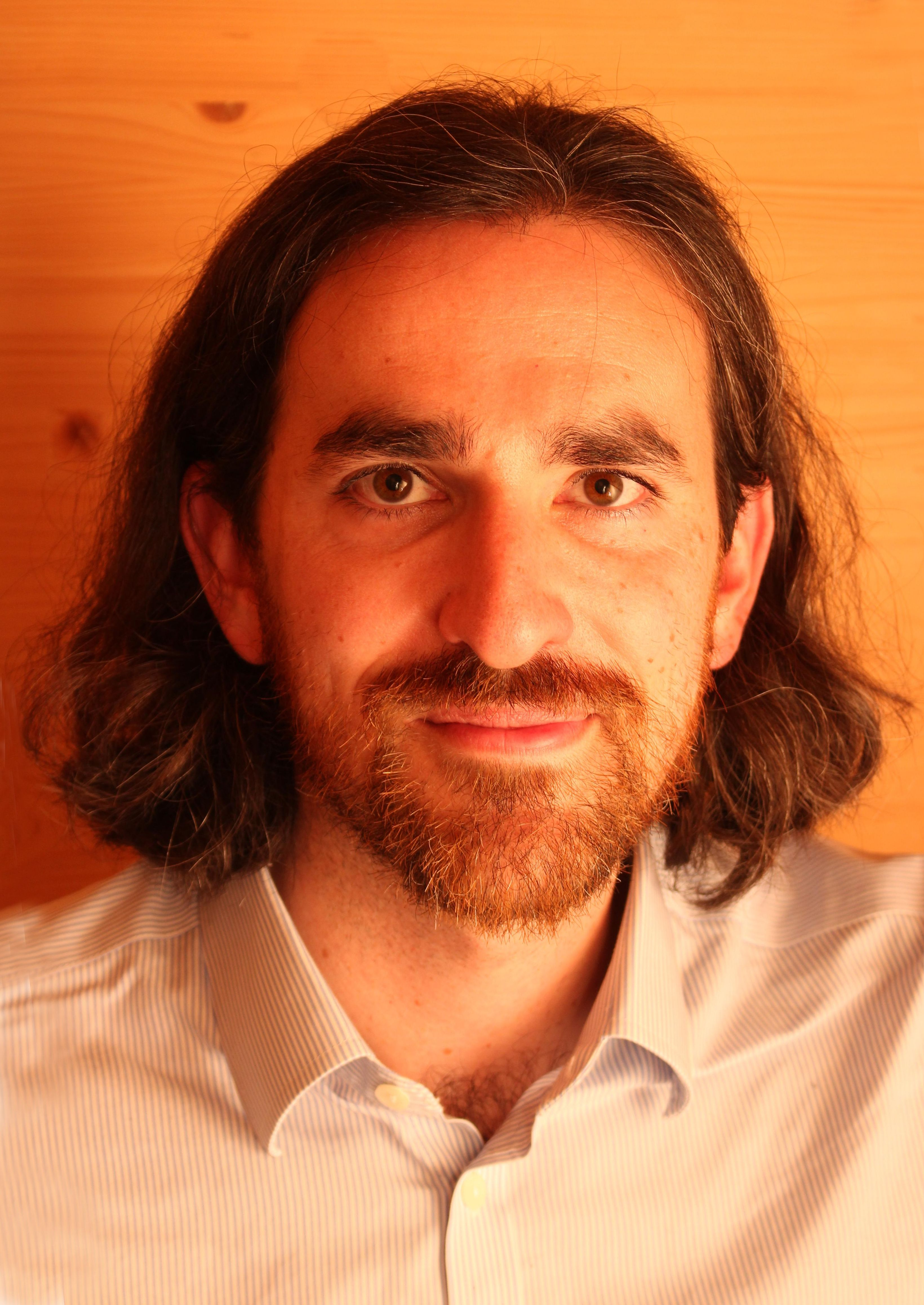
- Charney in 2017
- Born: November 27, 1979 (age 46); New Haven, Connecticut, U.S.
- Occupations: Art historian, novelist
- Spouse: Urška Jeran
- Children: 2

Noah Charney (born November 27, 1979) is an American art historian and novelist based in Slovenia. He is the author of The Art Thief, a mystery novel about a series of thefts from European museums and churches, and is the founder of the Association for Research into Crimes against Art.

== Early life and education ==
Charney was born in New Haven, Connecticut in 1979. His parents, a psychiatrist and a professor of French Literature at Yale University, were, in his words, “of the class of Americans who idealize Europe”, and as a youth he spent most of his summers in France. He attended Choate Rosemary Hall, and received his undergraduate education at Colby College in Maine, where he majored in Art History and English Literature. During this period, he participated in exchange programs in both Paris and London. Also while at Colby, he founded the Colby Film Society and wrote several plays, one of which won the Horizons New Young Playwrights Competition in Atlanta, Georgia, in 2002, the year of his graduation.

After graduating, he moved to London, where he studied at the Courtauld Institute and received a Masters for his work on seventeenth century sculpture in Rome. He subsequently attended Cambridge University, St John's College, where he received a second Masters in History of Art, writing on Bronzino's London Allegory. He began a PhD, but chose not to complete his thesis. In the fall of 2012, he received a PhD in art history from the University of Ljubljana, with a thesis on the work of the Slovenian architect Jože Plečnik (1872–1957).

== Other projects ==
Charney's first novel, The Art Thief, was published by Atria, a division of Simon and Schuster, New York, in September 2007. As he researched his novel he found that there was little scholarly material on the subject of art crime. So he organized a conference on the subject in Cambridge in 2006, which attracted the heads of the art crime divisions of the FBI, Scotland Yard, and the Italian Carabinieri, and was the subject of an article in The New York Times Magazine. In 2007 he joined with them, along with academics and others interested in the field, to form the Association for Research into Crimes against Art (ARCA). ARCA is a non-profit think tank, based in Rome, dedicated to helping to prevent and prosecute art thefts, and to establishing the study of art crime as an academic subject.

Charney taught at Cambridge University's summer program and at Miami Dade College's program in Florence. In 2009 he taught a seminar on Art Crime at Yale University, New Haven. He is currently an adjunct professor of art history at the American University in Rome. He has also been a visiting scholar at the Institute of Criminology in Ljubljana, Slovenia. He is the editor of Art and Crime, a collection of original essays by experts in the field, published by Praeger Press in the Spring of 2009. In February 2010, geoPlaneta published a series of four museum guidebooks by Charney in Spanish and English. Called Museum Time (De Museos), the first books in the series provide guided tours to highlights of the collections of the leading museums of Madrid, Barcelona, Seville, and the Basque Country. His nonfiction work on the many thefts of the Ghent Altarpiece, called Stealing the Mystic Lamb, was published in October 2010 by Public Affairs. In August 2011, on the 100th anniversary of the theft of the Mona Lisa from the Louvre Museum in Paris, he published a monograph called The Thefts of the Mona Lisa: On Stealing the World's Most Famous Painting.

ARCA offered its first postgraduate-level course in art crime and security in the summer of 2009 — a 10-week course in the town of Amelia, Italy. The program has hosted student attendees from 14 countries. Charney also edits The Journal of Art Crime, a twice-yearly scholarly publication on art crime and security. His column, "How I Write", which featured interviews with writers such as Oliver Sacks, Barbara Kingsolver, Jodi Picoult, Stephen Greenblatt, and Andre Aciman, was a regular feature in The Daily Beast from 2012 to 2014. In the 2012 issue of the St John's College, Cambridge, alumni magazine The Eagle, Charney wrote an article entitled "Professor of Art Crime," telling how his experiences at Cambridge led to his study of art crime. Charney also published The Art of Forgery, which explores the world of art forgeries. In 2022, Charney was the writer and presenter of the three-part BBC Radio 4 series China's Stolen Treasures.

In 2017, he coauthored with Ingrid D. Rowland The Collector of Lives: Giorgio Vasari and the Invention of Art.
