= Operation Pandora =

Operation Pandora is an international operation launched in 2016 targeting illicit trafficking in looted or stolen cultural goods, coordinated by Europol, Interpol and the World Customs Organization. After Pandora VI, 147,050 cultural artefacts had been recovered and 407 arrests made by early 2022.
