= Association for Research into Crimes against Art =

Nongovernmental civil society organisation

- Abbreviation: ARCA
- Formation: 2009
- Founder: Noah Charney
- Type: NGO
- Website: www.artcrimeresearch.org

The Association for Research into Crimes against Art (ARCA) is a non-governmental civil society organisation (CSO) that conducts scholarly research and training in the field of combating cultural property crime. Established in 2009, ARCA was created to address gaps in the international legal framework related to art and antiquities crimes. It was founded by Noah Charney, an art historian, art crime expert, and published author.

Internationally recognized for its work in the specialized field of art crime research, ARCA's affiliate researchers are frequently interviewed by the press and invited to provide commentary on criminal incidents impacting the art market. They also offer insights on cases where art crimes intersect with other forms of criminality, such as money laundering, organized crime, and terrorist financing.

The Association's work has been recognized by both governmental and non-governmental institutions as a valuable resource for understanding and interpreting art crimes. To support this mission, ARCA maintains collaborative relationships with intergovernmental and non-governmental organizations through cooperation agreements with international bodies, including the United Nations Educational, Scientific and Cultural Organization (UNESCO), the International Institute for the Unification of Private Law (UNIDROIT), and the International Council of Museums (ICOM) Observatory of Illicit Traffic.

== History and activities ==
ARCA was established in 2009 to address gaps in the international legal framework concerning art and antiquities crimes. It was founded by Dr. Noah Charney, an art historian, art crime expert, and author.

As one of the earliest volunteer-driven forums of its kind, the Association focuses on uniting experts from diverse fields, including art, archaeology, criminal justice, and law, to collaborate and share knowledge, research, and resources. Its aim is to better analyze and address the complexities of cultural property crimes more effectively. The Association’s goals include raising awareness and fostering dialogue about the intricacies of transnational cultural property-related crimes, including their causes, prevention, and control. It also seeks to highlight how stolen art and looted cultural items can serve as sources of profit that fuel other criminal activities.

=== International advisory ===
In March 2018, ARCA was invited to participate in UNESCO's Category 6 expert committee meeting and conference at its Paris headquarters. The event focused on engaging the European art market and sensitizing relevant stakeholders to the implications of illicit cultural property trafficking, including its impact on cultural heritage protection, terrorism financing, and money laundering.

In 2023, ARCA addressed an audience of diplomats, policymakers, and stakeholders at a United Nations event organized by the Counter-Terrorism Committee Executive Directorate (CTED). The organization spoke about emerging trends in the destruction of cultural heritage, the illicit trade of cultural property, and their connections to terrorism.

=== Criminal justice advisory ===
ARCA's research has been recognized for supporting law enforcement and public prosecutors in protecting cultural heritage and upholding the rule of law. In one notable case, the Association's contributions were acknowledged by the Manhattan District Attorney's Office in New York for assisting in the Grand Jury investigation into private antiquities collector Michael Steinhardt. The investigation focused on his acquisition, possession, and sale of antiquities that were determined to be stolen property under New York law. This acknowledgment is a matter of public record and is accessible through the New York Courts.

ARCA also serves as an advisory body for Operation Pandora, an annual European police operation conducted within the framework of the European Multidisciplinary Platform Against Criminal Threats (EMPACT). Launched in 2016, the operation targets the illicit trafficking of looted or stolen cultural goods circulating in the European market. This multi-country initiative is coordinated by Europol, Interpol, and the World Customs Organization and involves experts in art crime research, including ARCA's forensic analysts. These specialists assist law enforcement agencies by facilitating the identification of illicitly trafficked art.

In line with its outreach goals, researchers supported by ARCA have identified numerous looted or stolen cultural properties circulating within the legitimate art market. They have also exposed fraudulent art schemes involving U.S. dealers who falsify provenance records to launder illicit antiquities.

=== Training ===
Since 2009, the Association has offered a professional development Postgraduate Certificate Program in Art Crime and Cultural Heritage Protection. This program consists of eleven courses held annually during the summer in Amelia, Italy.

In 2017, the Association launched a second in-person initiative, offering advanced and introductory provenance research training courses in partnership with the Holocaust Art Restitution Project.

During the stringent COVID-19 lockdowns in Italy, ARCA developed a series of online training courses to comply with health and safety regulations aimed at reducing virus transmission. During this period, the Association's online courses were highlighted by The International Alliance for the Protection of Heritage in Conflict Areas (ALIPH) as providing "useful, accurate, and up-to-date topics on the subject of art crime and cultural heritage protection."

ARCA has also provided tailored training in partnership with UNESCO through the agency's Heritage Emergency Fund. In 2018, this training took place in Beirut, Lebanon. From 15 to 18 March 2021, ARCA delivered training modules for twenty-four customs officers from Eastern and Central Europe who participated in a virtual specialized PITCH (Preventing Illicit Trafficking of Cultural Heritage) training. This training was organized jointly by the World Customs Organization (WCO) and the Organization for Security and Cooperation in Europe (OSCE).

=== Sponsorship and outreach ===
When funding allows, ARCA has sponsored the documentation and exploration of new methodologies, approaches, and interactions focused on art and antiquities crime, as well as efforts toward its mitigation. In 2012, the Association awarded its Writer's Residency to Dr. Laurie Rush, a U.S.-based archaeologist and Cultural Resource Manager at Fort Drum. Dr. Rush advocates for Cultural Property Protection as a force multiplier in stability operations within the military. During her summer residency with ARCA, she was introduced to officers from Italy's Carabinieri art crime police unit, who, in turn, authorized the first English-language book highlighting the work of the Italian military's Carabinieri Command for the Protection of Cultural Property.

Since 2010, the Association has hosted its eponymous international art crime conference in Amelia, Italy. This event is designed for academic researchers, provenance researchers, law enforcement officials, museum professionals, legal experts, and public prosecutors who are addressing the ethical and legal complexities of art and antiquities crime and cultural property protection.

In 2016, a weekend-long conference forum focused on the concept of Cultural Rights and Value Education. In 2018, the event emphasized art crimes committed during incidents of asymmetrical warfare in the Middle East and featured presentations from archaeologists working in the conflict zones of Syria and Iraq. More recently, in 2023, an ARCA-affiliated forensic researcher was appointed to serve on the international panel of experts assisting with the British Museum's recovery project, aimed at recovering artifacts stolen from the museum.

== Publications ==
Since 2009, ARCA has published the peer-reviewed Journal of Art Crime (JAC) on a biannual basis. The journal focuses on interdisciplinary academic articles related to art and antiquities crimes, their investigation, and their long-term repercussions. Some articles in the JAC represent the first publication of forensic work conducted by leading art crime-focused archaeologists, who track and identify looted antiquities circulating in the art market.

The JAC also features "cold cases," shedding light on lesser-known work by law enforcement investigators, who are often restricted from commenting on cases until long after the investigations have been closed.

The Journal of Art Crime (JAC) is available to subscribers in both print and ePaper formats. It is also accessible through university digital research lending platforms, including the HeinOnline Law Journal Library. Additionally, the JAC can be accessed via the Metropolitan Museum of Art's library collection and the regional interlibrary loan system known as UBorrow.

ARCA also maintains an art crime blog that provides free, open-access resources for scholars, law enforcement professionals, museum curators, and the general public. The blog addresses issues related to cultural property crime and the organization's activities, offering insights into the complexities of art crime and its broader societal implications. Since 2009, the Association has published more than 2,000 articles covering topics such as provenance, looting, illicit trafficking, forgery, vandalism, and iconoclasm.

== In the media ==
In 2021, ARCA's work was featured in two film documentaries, one originating in the United States and the other in the UK.

The first, Lot 448, directed by Bella Monticelli, premiered at the 2021 Tribeca Film Festival as part of the festival's Female Trailblazers film series. Focused on showcasing women working in traditionally male-dominated fields, the film highlighted the efforts of one of ARCA's forensic researchers. The researcher gathered evidence in an attempt to stop the auction of a looted Etruscan antefix and worked to return the artifact to its country of origin.

The second documentary, titled Art Traffickers – Treasures Stolen From the Tombs, was produced by TIWI for Sky Arts. This film features commentary from an ARCA researcher discussing the historic looting and plunder carried out by some of Italy's most notorious antiquities trafficking networks.
