= Postgraduate Institute of Agriculture =

Graduate school in the University of Peradeniya

The Postgraduate Institute of Agriculture (PGIA) of the University of Peradeniya is a graduate school that provides trained scientific personnel for the agricultural sector. It was established in 1975. The institution functions as a semi-autonomous unit within the University of Peradeniya. The PGIA offers three degree programmes, M.Sc., M.Phil. and Ph.D/DBA. It has awarded 40 Ph.D., 261 M.Phil., 1019 M.Sc. and 35 MBA degrees since its inception.

== Programs ==
=== Agricultural biology ===
- M.Sc. in Biotechnology
- M.Sc. in Biology

=== Agricultural economics ===
- Postgraduate Diploma in Development Practice Management
- M.Sc. in Agricultural Economics (By Course Work)
- M.Sc. in Environmental Economics (By Course Work)
- M.Sc. in Natural Resource Management (By Course Work)
- M. Phil. in Agricultural Economics (By Course Work and Research)
- M. Phil. in Agricultural Economics (By Research)
- Ph.D. in Agricultural Economics (By Course Work and Research)
- Ph.D. in Agricultural Economics (By Research)

=== Agricultural engineering ===
- M.Sc. in Integrated Water Resources Management (IWRM)
- M.Sc. in Agricultural and Biosystems Engineering
- M.Sc. in Geoinformatics

=== Agricultural extension ===
- M.Sc. in Organizational Management
- M.Sc. in Development Communication and Extension

=== Animal Science ===
- M.Sc. in Animal Science
- M.Sc. in Poultry Science and Technology
- M.Sc. in Dairy and Meat Product Technology
- M.Sc. in Aquatic Bio-resources Management and Aquaculture

=== Business administration ===
- Degree Programme in Master of Business Administration (MBA)
- Degree Programme in Doctor of Business Administration (DBA)
- Degree Programme in Doctor of Philosophy (Ph.D.)

=== Crop science ===
- M.Sc. in Crop Science
- M.Sc. in Environmental Forestry
- M.Sc. in Floriculture and Landscape Architecture
- M.Sc in Tropical Agriculture (By Course Work and Research)

=== Food science and technology ===
- M.Sc. in Food Science and Technology
- M.Sc. in Food and Nutrition

=== Plant protection ===
- M.Sc. in Plant Protection Technology
- M.Sc. in Molecular and Applied Microbiology

=== Soil science ===
- M.Sc. in Tropical Soil Management
- M.Sc. in Environmental Soil Science
- M.Sc. in Soil and Environmental Microbiology
