= Bacillosamine =

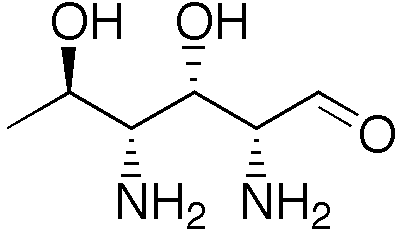

Names
- IUPAC name (2R,3S,4R,5R)-2,4-Diamino-3,5-dihydroxyhexanal
- Other names 4-Deoxyneosamine C 2,4-Diamino-2,4,6-trideoxy-D-Glucose

Identifiers
CAS Number	7013-45-8
3D model (JSmol)	Interactive image
ChEBI	CHEBI:32538
ChemSpider	167348
PubChem CID	192835
UNII	MD3HE5G5RE
CompTox Dashboard (EPA)	DTXSID30220411
- InChI: InChI=1S/C6H14N2O3/c1-3(10)5(8)6(11)4(7)2-9/h2-6,10-11H,7-8H2,1H3/t3-,4+,5-,6-/m1/s1 Key: UOKKJQVOZSYEJM-JGWLITMVSA-N; InChI=1/C6H14N2O3/c1-3(10)5(8)6(11)4(7)2-9/h2-6,10-11H,7-8H2,1H3/t3-,4+,5-,6-/m1/s1 Key: UOKKJQVOZSYEJM-JGWLITMVBO
- SMILES: O=C[C@H](N)[C@@H](O)[C@H](N)[C@H](O)C

Properties
Chemical formula	C_{6}H_{14}N_{2}O_{3}
Molar mass	162.19
- Except where otherwise noted, data are given for materials in their standard state (at 25 °C [77 °F], 100 kPa). verify (what is ?) Infobox references

Bacillosamine is a rare amino sugar first discovered in Bacillus subtilis.
