= Marvin (given name) =

- Gender: Masculine

Origin
- Origin: Wales

Other names
- Related names: Mervin, Mervyn, Merwin, Myrddin

Marvin is a masculine given name, derived from the Welsh name Mervyn, an Anglicized form of Merfyn. The name Merfyn contains the Old Welsh elements mer, probably meaning "marrow", and myn, meaning "eminent".

== People ==
- Marvin Abney (born 1949), American politician
- Marvin Adams, American nuclear engineer
- Marvin Lee Aday (1948–2022), American singer
- Marvin Agustin (born 1979), Filipino actor
- Marvin Akahomen (born 2007), Swiss footballer
- Marvin Albert (1924–1996), American writer
- Marvin C. Alkin (born 1934), American professor
- Marvin Allen (disambiguation), multiple people
- Marvin Ammori, American activist
- Marvin Anderson (born 1982), Jamaican athlete
- Marvin Harold Anderson (1918–1998), American businessman
- Marvin Andrews (born 1975), Trinidadian footballer
- Marvin Anieboh (born 1997), Equatorial Guinean footballer
- Marvin Stuart Antelman (1933–2013), Israeli-American chemist
- Marvin Arneson (born 1943), Canadian boxer
- Marvin S. Arrington Sr. (1941–2023), American judge
- Marvin Ash (1914–1974), American pianist
- Marvin J. Ashton (1915–1994), American author and religious figure
- Marvin Aspen (born 1934), American judge
- Marvan Atapattu (born 1970), Sri Lankan cricket coach
- Marvin Austin (born 1989), American football player
- Marvin Ávila (born 1985), Guatemalan footballer
- Marvin Bagley III (born 1999), American basketball player
- Marvin Bakalorz (born 1989), German footballer
- Marvin Bam (born 1977), South African field hockey player
- Marvin Barker (1912–??), American baseball player
- Marvin Barkis (1943–2024), American politician
- Marvin Barnes (1952–2014), American basketball player
- Marvin Bartley (born 1986), English footballer
- Marvin Bass (1919–2010), American football player
- Marvin R. Baxter (born 1940), American judge
- Marvin Bejarano (born 1988), Bolivian footballer
- Marvin Bell (1937–2020), American poet
- Marvin Benard (born 1970), American baseball player
- Marvin Bernárdez (born 1995), Honduran footballer
- Marvin A. Blyden (born 1962), Virgin Island politician
- Marvin Booker (born 1990), American football player
- Marvin Bower (1903–2003), American businessman
- Marvin Bracy (born 1993), American football player
- Marvin Brown (born 1983), English footballer
- Marvin Brown (Honduran footballer) (born 1974), Honduran footballer
- Marvin Burke (1918–1994), American race car driver
- Marvin W. Bursch (1913–2000), American businessman and politician
- Marvin Burton (1885–1970), American law enforcement officer
- Marvin Bush (born 1956), American businessman
- Marvin Cabrera (born 1980), Mexican footballer
- Marvin Camel (born 1951), American boxer
- Marvin Felix Camillo (1937–1988), American theatre director
- Marvin Campbell (born 1961), British gymnast
- Marvin Campbell (politician) (1849–1930), American politician
- Marvin Casey (born 1981), Israeli-American dancer
- Marvin Ceballos (born 1992), Guatemalan footballer
- Marvin Chávez (born 1983), Honduran footballer
- Marvin Chirelstein (1928–2015), American professor
- Marvin Chodorow (1913–2005), American physicist
- Marvin J. Chomsky (1929–2022), American director
- Marvin Cobb (born 1953), American football player
- Marvin Cohen (American writer) (born 1931), American novelist
- Marvin L. Cohen (born 1935), American physicist
- Marvin Coleman (born 1972), American football player
- Marvin Cone (1891–1965), American painter
- Marvin Rodríguez Cordero (born 1960), Costa Rican politician
- Marvin Couch, American politician
- Marvin Crawford (1932–2004), American skier
- Marvin Creamer (1916–2020), American sailor and professor
- Marvin Crenshaw (born 1952), America football player
- Marvin Cruz (born 1985), Filipino basketball player
- Marvin T. Culpepper (1908–1970), American politician
- Marvin Çuni (born 2001), Albanian footballer
- Marvin Cupper (born 1994), German ice hockey player
- Marvin Dames, Bahamian politician
- Marvin Dana (1867–1926), American author
- Marvin Dauner (1927–2010), American farmer and politician
- Marvin Davis (1925–2004), American industrialist
- Marvin Davis (Canadian football) (born 1952), American football player
- Marvin R. Dee (1917–1977), American lawyer and politician
- Marvin Degon (born 1983), American ice hockey player
- Marvin Dekil, Nigerian environmental scientist
- Marvin De Lima (born 2004), French footballer
- Marvin Delph (born 1956), American basketball player
- Marvin Dienst (born 1997), German racing driver
- Marvin Dixon (born 1983), Jamaican bobsledder
- Marvin Dunn (born 1940), American educator, historian, and filmmaker
- Marvin Eastman (born 1971), American mixed martial artist
- Marvin Egho (born 1994), Austrian footballer
- Marvin Ekpiteta (born 1995), English footballer
- Marvin Emnes (born 1988), Dutch footballer
- Marvin Etzioni, American singer
- Marvin Filipo (born 1987), New Zealand rugby league footballer
- Marvin Fletes (born 1997), Nicaraguan footballer
- Marvin Francis (1955–2005), Native Canadian poet
- Marvin Franklin, American football coach
- Marvin Freeman (born 1963), American baseball player
- Marvin Friedrich (born 1995), German footballer
- Marvin D. Fuller (1921–2007), American general
- Marvin Gabrion (born 1953), American murderer
- Marvin Gakpa (born 1993), French footballer
- Marvin Gamez (born 2003), American soccer player
- Marvin K. Gardner (born 1952), American hymn writer
- Marvin Garrett (born 1963), American horseback rider
- Marvin Gauci, Maltese chef
- Marvin Gay Sr. (1914–1998), American minister
- Marvin Gaye (1939–1984), American singer-songwriter
- Marvin Gettleman (1933–2017), American professor
- Marvin Girouard (1939–2020), American business executive
- Marvin Goldfried (born 1936), American psychologist
- Marvin Goldman (born 1928), American biologist
- Marvin Goldstein (born 1950), Israeli-American pianist
- Marvin Gonzales, Trinidad and Tobago politician
- Marvin Goodfriend (1950–2019), American economist
- Marvin Graves (born 1971), American football player
- Marvin Gray (1954–2013), American serial killer
- Marvin Greenberg (1935–2017), American mathematician
- Marvin Griffin (1907–1982), American politician
- Marvin Hagler (1954–2021), American boxer
- Marvin Hall (born 1993), American football player
- Marvin Hamlisch (1944–2012), American composer
- Marvin Hammond (1926–2003), Canadian rower
- Marvin Harada (born 1953), Canadian-American bishop
- Marvin Harris (1927–2001), American anthropologist
- Marvin Harrison (born 1972), American football player
- Marvin Harrison Jr. (born 2002), American football player
- Marvin Harvey (disambiguation), multiple people
- Marvin Haskin (1930-2009), American radiologist
- Marvin Hayes (disambiguation), multiple people
- Marvin Heemeyer (1951–2004), American welder, businessman and vandal
- Marvin C. Helling (1923–2014), American football player
- Marvin Hemmings (born 1979), American songwriter
- Marvin Hershkowitz (1931–2020), American basketball player
- Marvin Hewitt (1922–1991), American imposter
- Marvin Hier (born 1939), American film producer
- Marvin S. Hill (1928–2016), American professor
- Marvin Hinton (1940–2025), English footballer
- Marvin Hoffenberg (1914–2013), American economist and political scientist
- Marvin E. Holmes Jr. (born 1948), American politician
- Marvin Hudson (born 1964), American baseball umpire
- Marvin Hughitt (1837–1928), American businessman
- Marvin Humes (born 1985), English singer
- Marvin Hunt (born 1951), Canadian politician
- Marvin P. Iannone, American police officer
- Marvin Iraheta (born 1992), Salvadoran footballer
- Marvin Irvin (born 1949), American serial killer
- Marvin Isley (1953–2010), American guitarist
- Marvin Israel (1924–1984), American artist
- Marvin James (born 1989), Swiss snowboarder
- Marvin Johnson (disambiguation), multiple people
- Marvin Jones (disambiguation), multiple people
- Marvin Josephson (1927–2022), American executive
- Marvin Jouno (born 1984), French musician
- Marvin Kalb (born 1930), American journalist
- Marvin Kaplan (1927–2016), American actor
- Marvin Kaplan (lawyer), American lawyer and politician
- Marvin Karlins (born 1941), American professor
- Marvin Kaye (1938–2021), American author
- Marvin Kent (1816–1908), American politician
- Marvin Kimble (born 1995), American artistic gymnast
- Marvin Kirchhöfer (born 1994), German racing driver
- Marvin Kitman (1929–2023), American critic
- Marvin Kleihs (born 1994), German footballer
- Marvin Knoll (born 1990), German footballer
- Marvin Kokos (born 2000), French footballer
- Marvin Koner (1921–1983), American photographer
- Marvin Kratter (1915–1999), American real estate developer
- Marvin Kren (born 1980), Austrian director
- Marvin Krislov (born 1960), American academic administrator
- Marvin Kristynik, American football player
- Marvin Krohn (born 1947), American criminologist
- Marvin Lamb (born 1946), American composer
- Marvin Lane (born 1950), American baseball player
- Marvin Lazarus (born 1985), South African cricketer
- Marvin Levy (disambiguation), multiple people
- Marvin Lewellyn (1919–2010), American football coach
- Marvin Lewis (born 1958), American football coach
- Marvin Lier (born 1992), Swiss handball player
- Marvin Lim (born 1984), Filipino-American politician
- Marvin Lipofsky (1938–2016), American artist
- Marvin Loback (1896–1938), American actor
- Marvin Loría (born 1997), Costa Rican footballer
- Marvin Makinen (born 1939), American professor
- Marvin Mandel (1920–2015), American politician
- Marvin L. Maple (1936–2016), American criminal
- Marvin Márquez (born 1998), Salvadoran footballer
- Marvin Martin (born 1988), French footballer
- Marvin Martinez, Salvadoran-American academic administrator
- Marvin Matip (born 1985), German footballer
- Marvin H. McIntyre (1878–1943), American journalist
- Marvin McNutt (born 1989), American football player
- Marvin McQuitty (1966–2012), American drummer
- Marvin Mehlem (born 1997), German footballer
- Marvin Melville (born 1935), American skier
- Marvin Menzies (born 1961), American basketball coach
- Marvin Merritt IV (born 1998), American actor
- Marvin Meyer (1948–2012), American scholar
- Marvin Milkes (1923–1982), American sports executive
- Marvin Miller (disambiguation), multiple people
- Marvin Mims (born 2002), American football player
- Marvin Minoff (1931–2009), American producer
- Marvin Minsky (1927–2016), American cognitive scientist
- Marvin Mirisch (1918–2002), American producer
- Marvin Mitchell (born 1984), American football player
- Marvin Mitchelson (1928–2004), American lawyer
- Marvin E. Moate (1910–1984), American politician
- Marvin Möller (born 1999), German tennis player
- Marvin Monterrosa (born 1991), Salvadoran footballer
- Marvin Calvo Montoya (born 1961), Costa Rican biologist and politician
- Marvin Moore (born 1938), Canadian politician
- Marvin Morgan (born 1983), English footballer
- Marvin Morgan Jr. (born 1992), Jamaican footballer
- Marvin Mudrick (1921–1986), American professor
- Marvin Musquin (born 1989), French motocross racer
- Marvin Nash (1953–2023), Canadian sprinter
- Marvin Nelson (born 1958), American politician
- Marvin E. Newman (1927–2023), American photographer
- Marvin Obando (born 1960), Costa Rican footballer
- Marvin Obuz (born 2002), German footballer
- Marvin O'Connor (born 1991), French rugby union footballer
- Marvin O'Connor (basketball) (born 1978), American basketball player
- Marvin Ogunjimi (born 1987), Belgian-Nigerian footballer
- Marvin Ogunsipe (born 1996), Austrian basketball player
- Marvin Olasky (born 1950), American magazine editor
- Marvin Oliver (disambiguation), multiple people
- Marvin Omondi (born 1996), Kenyan footballer
- Marvin Opler (1914–1981), American anthropologist
- Marvin Orie (born 1993), South African rugby union footballer
- Marvin Owusu (born 2003), Ghanaian footballer
- Marvin Panch (1926–2015), American stock car racing driver
- Marvin Park (born 2000), Spanish footballer
- Marvin Peersman (born 1991), Belgian footballer
- Marvin R. Pendarvis (born 1989), American politician
- Marvin Perrett (1925–2007), American sailor
- Marvin Banks Perry Jr. (1918–1994), American academic administrator
- Marvin Philip (born 1982), American football player
- Marvin Phillips (born 1983), American basketball player
- Marvin Pierce (1893–1969), American publisher
- Marvin Pieringer (born 1999), German footballer
- Marvin Piñón (born 1991), Mexican footballer
- Marvin Pipkin (1889–1977), American chemist
- Marvin Plattenhardt (born 1992), German footballer
- Marvin Ponce, Honduran politician
- Marvin Pope (born 1969), American player of Canadian football
- Marvin H. Pope (1916–1997), American scholar of Hebrew
- Marvin Potzmann (born 1993), Austrian footballer
- Marvin Pourié (born 1991), German footballer
- Marvin Powell (1955–2022), American football player
- Marvin Priest (born 1981), British-Australian singer-songwriter
- Marvin Quijano (born 1979), Salvadoran footballer
- Marvin Raeburn (born 1975), Trinidadian footballer
- Marvin Rainwater (1925–2013), American singer-songwriter
- Marvin Ramirez (born 1989), Colombian basketball player
- Marvin Rees (born 1972), British politician
- Marvin Rettenmaier (born 1986), German poker player
- Marvin Rick (1901–1999), American runner
- Marvin Rittmüller (born 1999), German footballer
- Marvin Robinson (footballer) (born 1980), English footballer
- Marvin Robinson (politician), American politician
- Marvin Ronning (1961–2022), American community advocate
- Marvin Ross (born 1990), American football player
- Marvin Travis Runyon (1924–2004), American business executive
- Marvin R. Sambur (born 1946), American engineer
- Marvin Sanders (born 1967), American football coach
- Marvin Sands (1924–1999), American businessman
- Marvin Santiago (1947–2004), Puerto Rican singer
- Marvin Sapp (born 1967), American singer-songwriter
- Marvin Schick (1934–2020), American professor
- Marvin Schieb (born 1996), Romanian footballer
- Marvin Schlegel (born 1998), German athlete
- Marvin C. Schumann (1906–1994), American businessman and politician
- Marvin John Schwartz (1928–1997), American producer
- Marvin Scott (born 1944), American politician
- Marvin Sease (1946–2011), American singer-songwriter
- Marvin Seidel (born 1995), German badminton player
- Marvin Senaya (born 2001), French footballer
- Marvin Senger (born 2000), German footballer
- Marvin Sewell, American guitarist
- Marvin Shanken (born 1943), American publisher
- Marvin Glenn Shields (1939–1965), American sailor
- Marvin Simon (1939–2007), American engineer
- Marvin Sims (born 1957), American football player
- Marvin Singleton (born 1939), American politician
- Marvin Smith (disambiguation), multiple people
- Marvin Sonsona (born 1990), Filipino boxer
- Marvin Sordell (born 1991), English footballer
- Marvin Spielmann (born 1996), Swiss footballer
- Marvin Stamm (born 1939), American trumpeter
- Marvin Stein (1925–2010), American comic book artist
- Marvin Stein (computer scientist) (1924–2015), American computer scientist
- Marvin J. Sternberg (1912–1994), justice of the Kentucky Supreme Court
- Marvin Stewart (1912–2009), American football player
- Marvin Stewart (basketball), American basketball player
- Marvin Stinson (born 1952), American boxer
- Marvin Stone (1842–1899), American inventor
- Marvin Stone (basketball) (1981–2008), American basketball player
- Marvin Stout (1915–1991), American basketball player
- Marvin A. Sweeney (born 1953), American professor
- Marvin Switzer (born 1954), American football player
- Marvin Tate (born 1959), American singer-songwriter
- Marvin Terban (born 1940), American author
- Marvin Terrell (1938–2018), American football player
- Marvin Terrell (baseball), American baseball player
- Marvin Thiel (born 1995), German footballer
- Marvin Thompson (born 1977/1978), British writer
- Marvin Tile (born 1933), Canadian surgeon
- Marvin Tokayer (born 1936), American rabbi
- Marvin Townes (born 1980), American football player
- Marvin Townsend (1915–1999), American cartoonist
- Marvin Traub (1925–2012), American businessman
- Marvin Tshibuabua (born 2002), French footballer
- Marvin Turpin (1885–1???), Guyanese cricketer
- Marvin J. Udy (1892–1959), American scientist
- Marvin Upshaw (1946–2024), American football player
- Marvin Valdimarsson (born 1981), Icelandic basketball player
- Marvin Vettori (born 1993), Italian mixed martial artist
- Marvin Vincent (1834–1922), American minister
- Marvin Vogel (born 1985), Zimbabwean cricketer
- Marvin L. Warner (1919–2002), American ambassador
- Marvin Washington (born 1965), American football player
- Marvin Weatherwax Jr., American politician
- Marvin Webster (1952–2009), American basketball player
- Marvin Weiss (born 1995), German footballer
- Marvin Westmore (1934–2020), American artist
- Marvin White (born 1983), American football player
- Marvin Williams (disambiguation), multiple people
- Marvin Wilson (disambiguation), multiple people
- Marvin Winans (born 1958), American singer
- Marvin Wolfgang (1924–1998), American sociologist
- Marvin Worth (1925–1998), American producer
- Marvin X (born 1944), American poet
- Marvin Yancy (1950–1985), American musician
- Marvin York (1932–2025), American politician
- Marvin R. Young (1947–1968), American soldier
- Marvin Zelen (1927–2014), American professor
- Marvin Zelkowitz (born 1945), American computer scientist
- Marvin Zindler (1921–2007), American news reporter
- Marvin Zuckerman (1928–2018), American professor

== Fictional characters ==
- Marvin (horror host), 1950s Chicago area horror host
- Marvin Branagh, a Lieutenant at the Raccoon Police Department in Resident Evil 2
- Marvin the Martian, in the Looney Tunes cartoons
- Mouth McFadden, real name Marvin, a main character in One Tree Hill (TV series)
- Marvin T. Milk, a character from The Boys television series known as "Mother's Milk" and "MM"
- Marvin Monroe, a The Simpsons character who apparently died during the sixth season
- Marvin, the Paranoid Android, in The Hitchhiker's Guide to the Galaxy series
- Marvin Redpost, the main character in the Marvin Redpost series by Louis Sachar
- Marvin Suggs, from The Muppet Show
- Marvin White in the Super Friends cartoon and comic book
- Marvin, the main character in the Marvin trilogy by William Finn

== See also ==
- Marvin (disambiguation)
