= Marvin (surname) =

Marvin or Marven is an English surname derived from one of several personal names: Merewine, which itself could arise from Maerwin with an Old English meaning of "fame (or famous) friend"; the similar Old English Mǣrwynn, meaning "renowned joy"; Merefinn, which has an Old Norse derivation; or Merfyn/Mervyn, arising from Old Welsh with a meaning of "eminent marrow".

Marvin as a surname may refer to:

- Cal Marvin (1924–2004), American ice hockey player
- Carolyn Marvin, American author
- Charles Marvin (disambiguation), multiple people
- Edith Marvin (1872–1958), British civil servant
- Edward Marvin (1878–1918), English-South African cricketer
- Frederick Marvin (1920–2017), American pianist
- Gigi Marvin (born 1987), American ice hockey player
- Hank Marvin (born 1941), British musician
- James Marvin (disambiguation), multiple people
- John Marvin (disambiguation), multiple people
- Junior Marvin (born 1949), Jamaican guitarist
- Lee Marvin (1924–1987), American actor
- Mia Marvin (1904–1992), American actress
- Michelle Triola Marvin (1932–2009), American actress
- Nathaniel C. Marvin (1826–1895), American politician
- Matthew Marvin (disambiguation), multiple people
- Richard Marvin (disambiguation), multiple people
- Ricky Marvin (born 1980), Mexican second-generation professional wrestler
- Rolland B. Marvin (1897–1979), American politician
- Samuel Marvin (1664–1754), English politician

Marven as a surname may refer to:

- Nigel Marven (born 1960), British television presenter
- Richard Marven, American naval officer and whistleblower

== See also ==
- Marvin (given name), a page for people with the given name "Marvin
- Senator Marvin (disambiguation), a disambiguation page of Senators with the surname "Marvin"
