= Iannone =

Iannone is a surname. Notable people with the surname include:

- Andrea Iannone (born 1989), Italian motorcycle road racer
- Bert Iannone (1917–1996), Canadian football player
- Carol Iannone, conservative writer and literary critic
- Claudio Iannone (born 1963), Argentine cyclist
- Dorothy Iannone (1933-2022), American-born visual artist
- Filippo Iannone (born 1957), Roman Catholic church leader
- Jamie Iannone, American businessman, CEO of eBay
- Marvin P. Iannone, American policeman
- Patrick Iannone (born 1982), Italian ice hockey player
- Tommaso Iannone (born 1990), Italian rugby player
