= Marvic =

Marvic is a given name that is typically used in a masculine context. It is commonly found in the Philippines.

Notable people with the name are:

- Marvic Leonen (born 1962), lawyer, jurist and Senior Associate Justice of the Supreme Court of the Philippines
- Marvic Sotto (born 1954), actor, comedian, and television personality

== See also ==
- Marvin
- Marivic Velaine Meneses (born 1995), volleyball player
