= David D. Stern =

American painter

David Stern
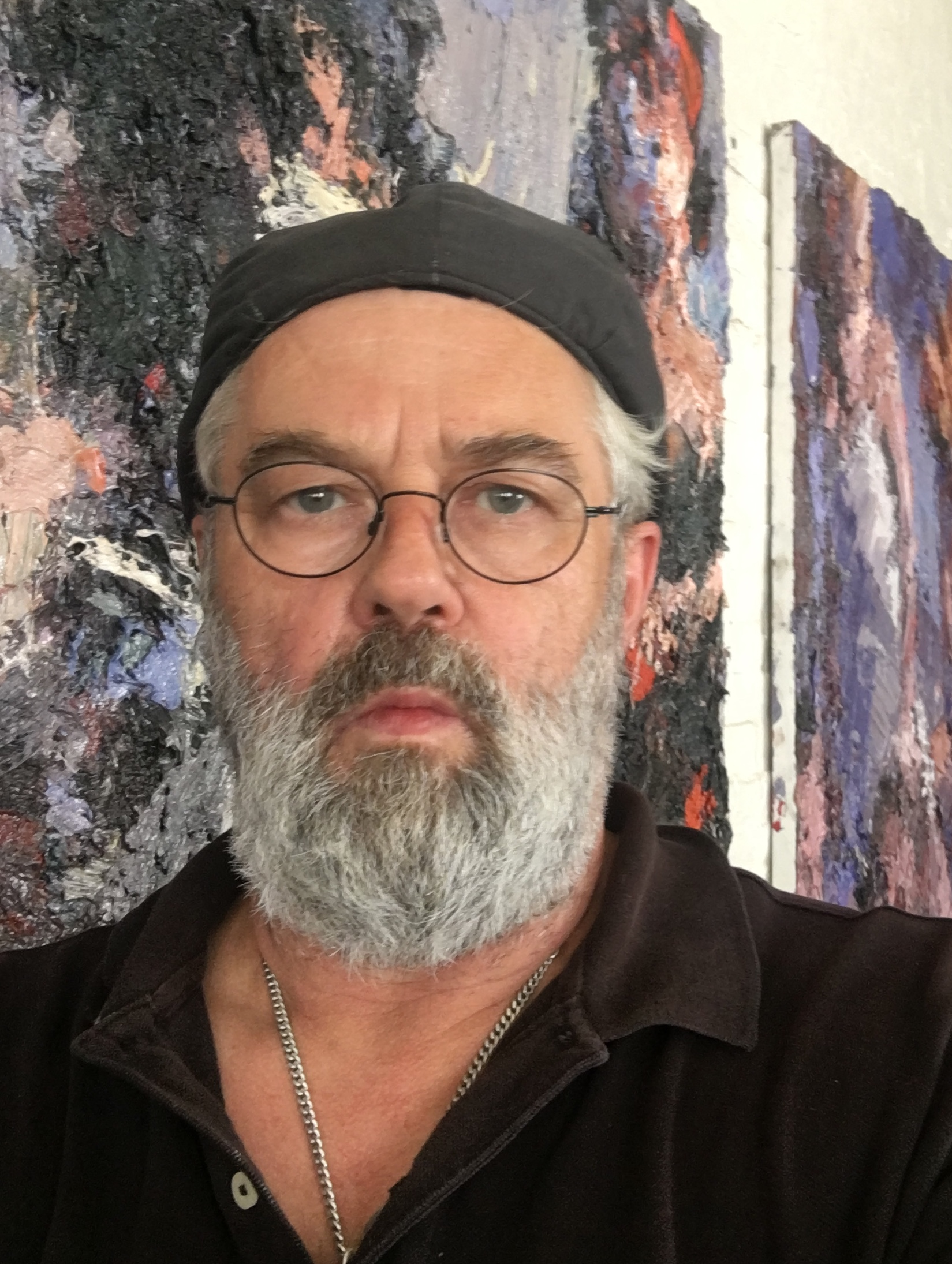
- David Stern, New York 2018
- Born: February 3, 1956 (age 70); Essen, West Germany
- Education: Fachhochschule für Design and Art Dortmund, Kunstakademie Düsseldorf
- Known for: Painting, Drawing, Printmaking

David Stern is a German-born American figurative painter, whose work is rooted in the European figurative art tradition and informed by American Abstract Expressionism. The main theme/motive of Stern's work is the human condition. He works almost exclusively from memory and his accumulated knowledge of the human figure. All of Stern's paintings are done with self-made mixtures of pure pigment and linseed oil. Since 2019 he has changed his practice and uses acrylic binder as a medium for his pigments.

== Biography ==
David Stern was born on February 3, 1956, in Essen, West Germany and lives in New York City. Stern has referred to himself as an “action painter,” echoing the artistic legacies of New York School painters Jackson Pollock, Willem de Kooning and Franz Kline. Yet his human forms reach further back to histories of portraiture.

After an apprenticeship as a sign painter Stern attended the Dortmund Fachhochschule für Design and Art (1975–79) and the Kunstakademie Düsseldorf (1980–82). He then taught painting at the Dortmund Fachhochschule für Design and Art, while he developed his painting skills living in a village near the town of Münster. In 1986 he moved to Cologne, where he found his artistic voice. From 1987 on, Stern exhibited his work nationally and quickly entered the international scene in the early nineties, with shows in Austria, Hungary, the Netherlands, Belgium and Great Britain. Stern's 1992 retrospective exhibition David Stern: Study for a Way at the Hungarian National Gallery in Budapest was the first exhibition by a contemporary Western artist after Hungary opened to the West.

In 1993, Stern showed his work in the US for the first time, immigrated in 1994 and became naturalized in 2000. Since his arrival, he has been fascinated by his encounters with an intensely urban place defined by its energy, crowding, speed and cosmopolitism. His national traveling exhibition David Stern: The American Years (1995–2008) curated by Karen Wilkin, demonstrates shifts in form and content in Stern's work since the artist moved to New York from Germany in 1995.

Stern has exhibited widely in New York City, the US and Europe. His work can be found in public and private collections in the United States, Europe and Asia, including the Metropolitan Museum of Art (New York), Kupferstichkabinett Dresden (Dresden, Germany), National Museum (Poznan, Poland), Dresdner Bank (Cologne, Germany), Kunstsammlung der Universität Göttingen (Göttingen, Germany), Arkansas Art Center (Little Rock), Museum of Contemporary Art Jacksonville (Jacksonville, Florida), John and Mable Ringling Museum of Art (Sarasota, Florida), and the National September 11 Memorial & Museum (New York).

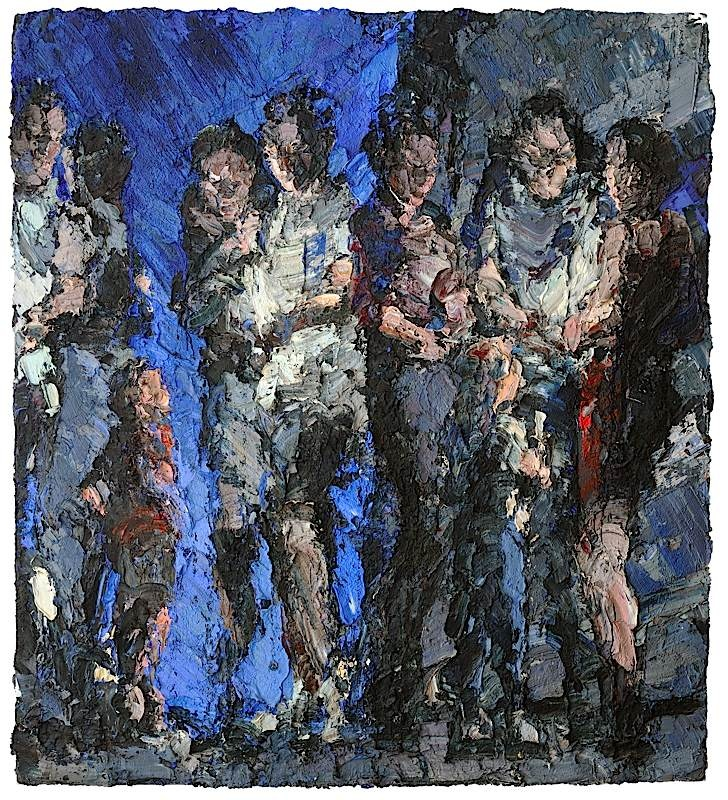
David Stern, The Gatherings, Diptych, left panel, 2001–2002. Oil on canvas, 82 x 73 inches. National September 11 Memorial & Museum, New York

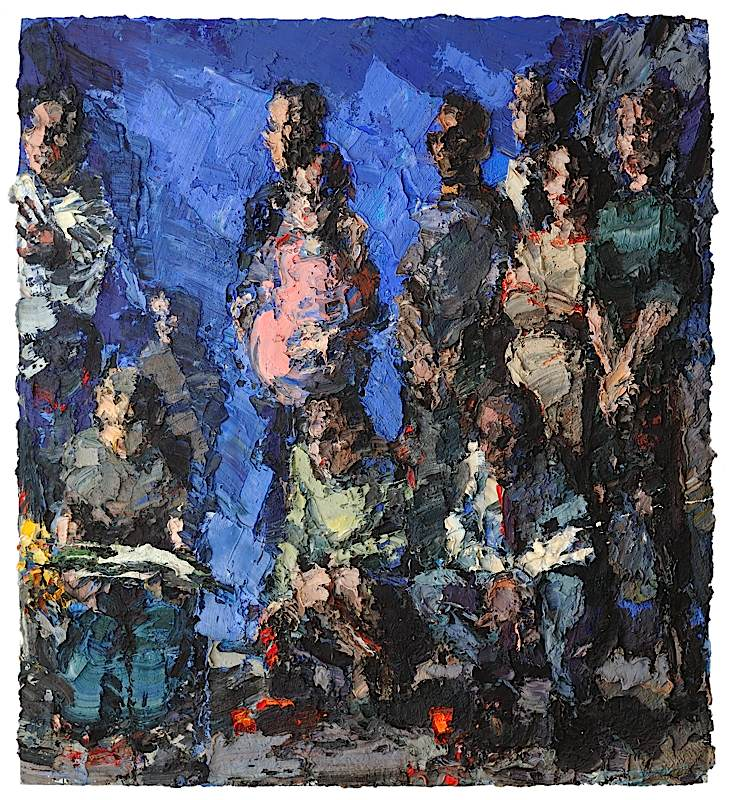
David Stern, The Gatherings, Diptych, right panel, 2001–2002. Oil on canvas, 82 x 73 inches. National September 11 Memorial & Museum, New York

== September 11, 2001 ==
Stern's paintings The Gatherings are powerful monuments of collective mourning after the events of September 11, 2001. The paintings are in the collection of the National September 11 Memorial & Museum in New York.

== Portraits ==
Throughout his career David Stern has created portraits - always self-portraits and portraits of those close to him - and always in the same close to life size - based on drawings that the model sits for. In addition to portraits of family members, he painted portraits of friends like the philosophers Günther Anders (1986/90) and Abraham Ehrlich (1990), the saxophonist Matze Schubert (1988), the artists Emil B. Hartwig (1990), Al Hansen (1993), Marvin Hayes and Frank Bara (2001/02) and William Wegman (2008), the football player Willis Crenshaw, the diplomats Berel Rodal (2002/03) and Ronald Fagan (1999), the author, screenwriter and poet Jeremy Larner (1999) the actress and therapist Doe Lang (2011/12), or the art critic and curator Karen Wilkin (1999).

== Digital Drawings ==
Stern has been involved with digital drawings since the first drawing apps for the iPhone came on the market. His thoughts about the nature and practice of digital drawings were published in 2013. In the same year, Stern published the artist book “heros and graces,” 21 years after he published “the erotic nature of truth” with the philosopher Abraham Ehrlich (among others in the collection of The Metropolitan Museum of Art). It is a meditation on gender and based on a number of touch screen drawings.

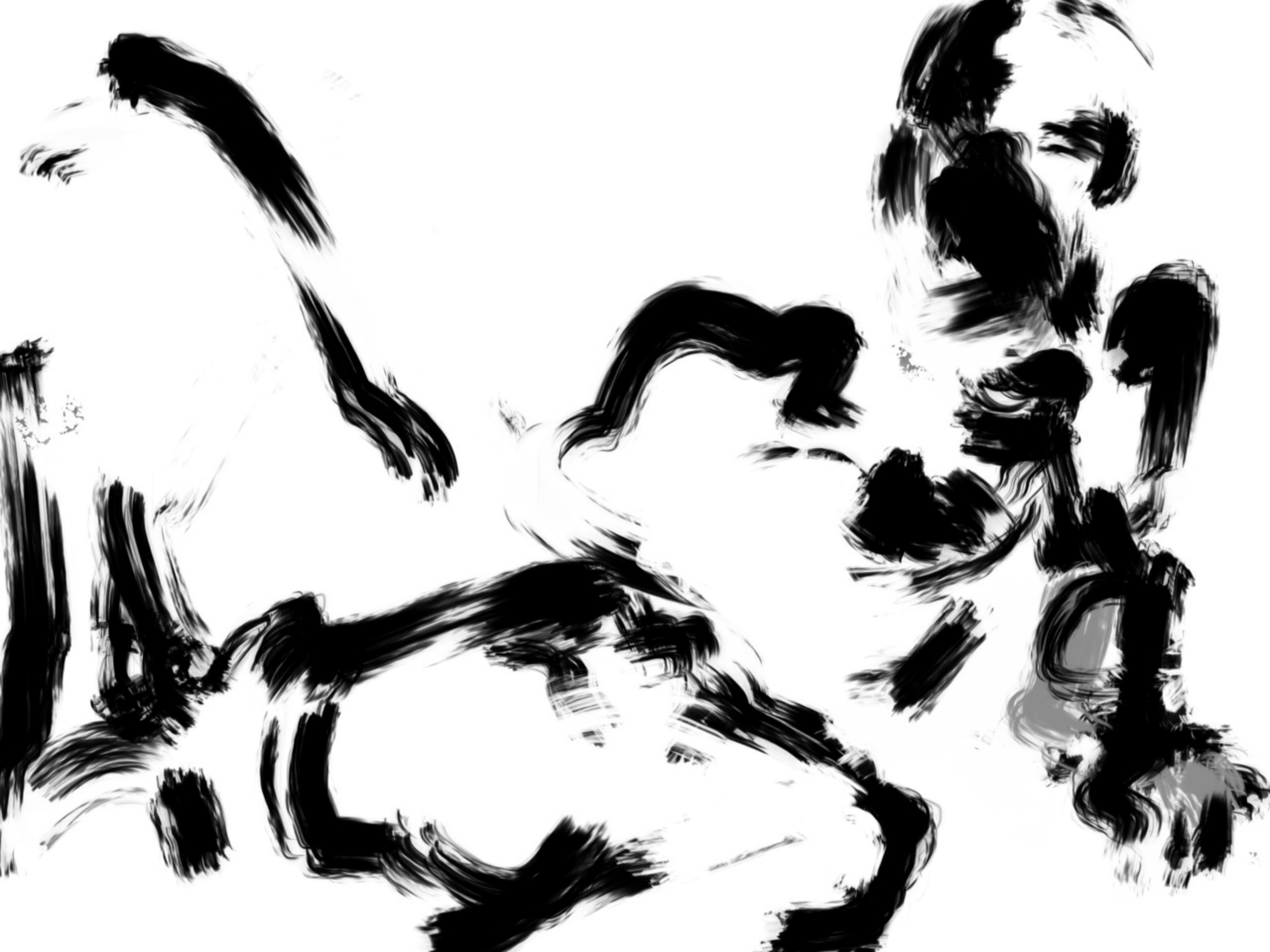
David Stern, Heroes and Graces, 2013. Digital drawing

== Works on Canvas and on Paper ==
Stern's work is and has always been figurative, using the universal experience of the visual world as a point of reference. The paintings are developed in a process of action and reaction, without a preconceived plan and/or image of a desired result. The themes of David Stern's works are always connected to his own experience and observation. He works almost exclusively from memory and his accumulated knowledge of the human figure. All of Stern's paintings are done with self-made mixtures of pure pigments and linseed oil. Since 2019, he uses acrylic binder as a medium for his pigments.

"I regard my paintings as innumerably different shaped vessels, which contents are according to the observing individual's experience (including myself). The content will have to take on the shape of the vessel, eventually." (David Stern, 2011)

Stern's works At the Gates are about the Threshold to the Unknown - Meditations about the Foreign. Art historian Elizabeth Berkowitz speaks with David Stern about his series "At the Gates" on August 4, 2020.

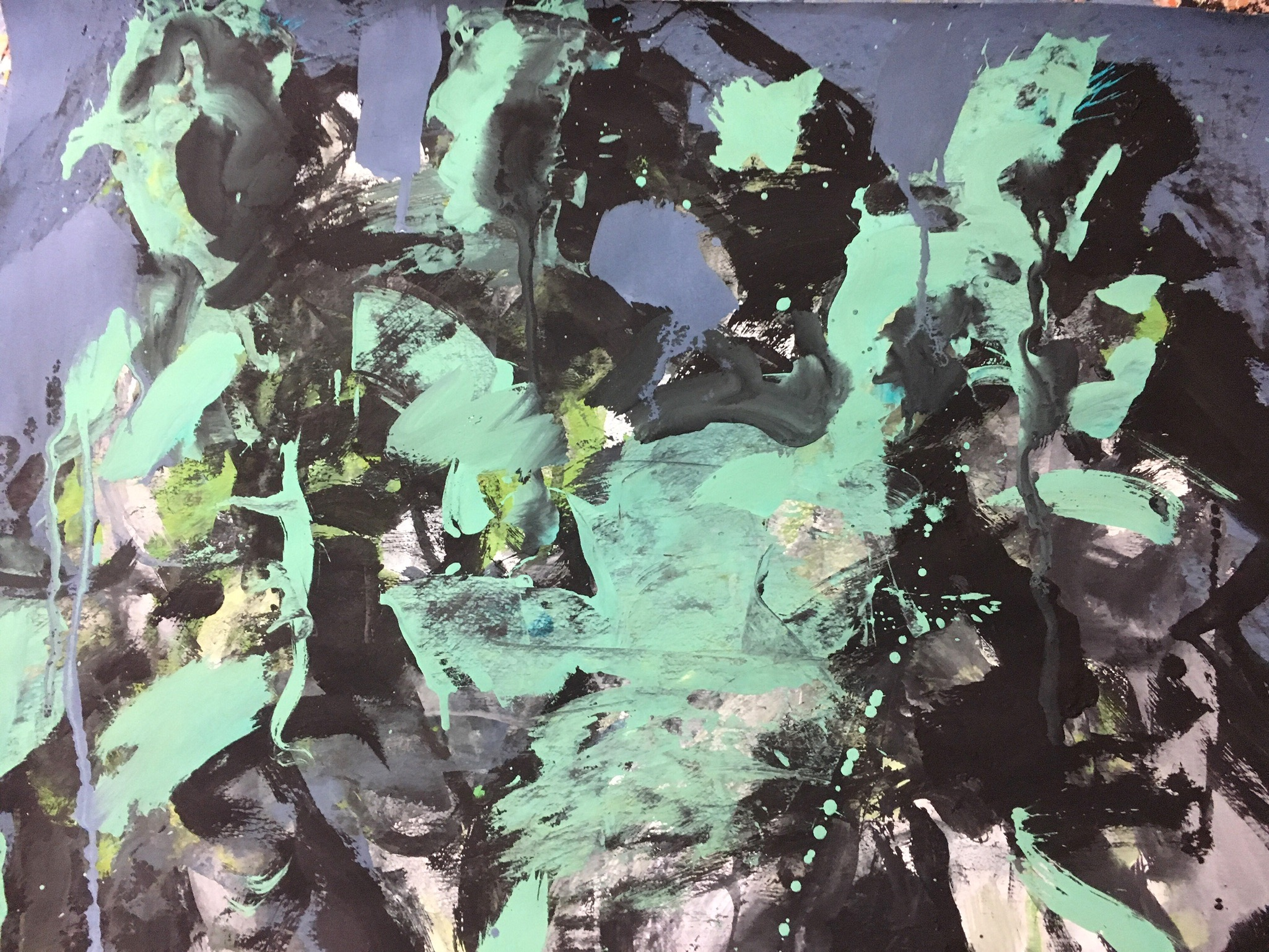
David Stern, At the Gates (D027), 2018. Acrylics and pigments on paper, 27 x 39 inches.

The paintings The Sons of God refer to a rather strange verse in Genesis 6/6:

“The Nephilim were on the earth in those days - and also afterward when the sons of God would consort with the daughters of man, who would bear to them. They were the mighty, who, from old, were men of devastation.”[10]

The motive of the falling man has interested him for a long time, having seen Max Beckmann's “Der Stürzende” as a young man. In the 1980s, he worked on some paintings with that theme, but deemed them unsuccessful and subsequently destroyed them. Art historian Eckhart Gillen speaks with David Stern about his series "The Sons of God" on December 17, 2020. German language.

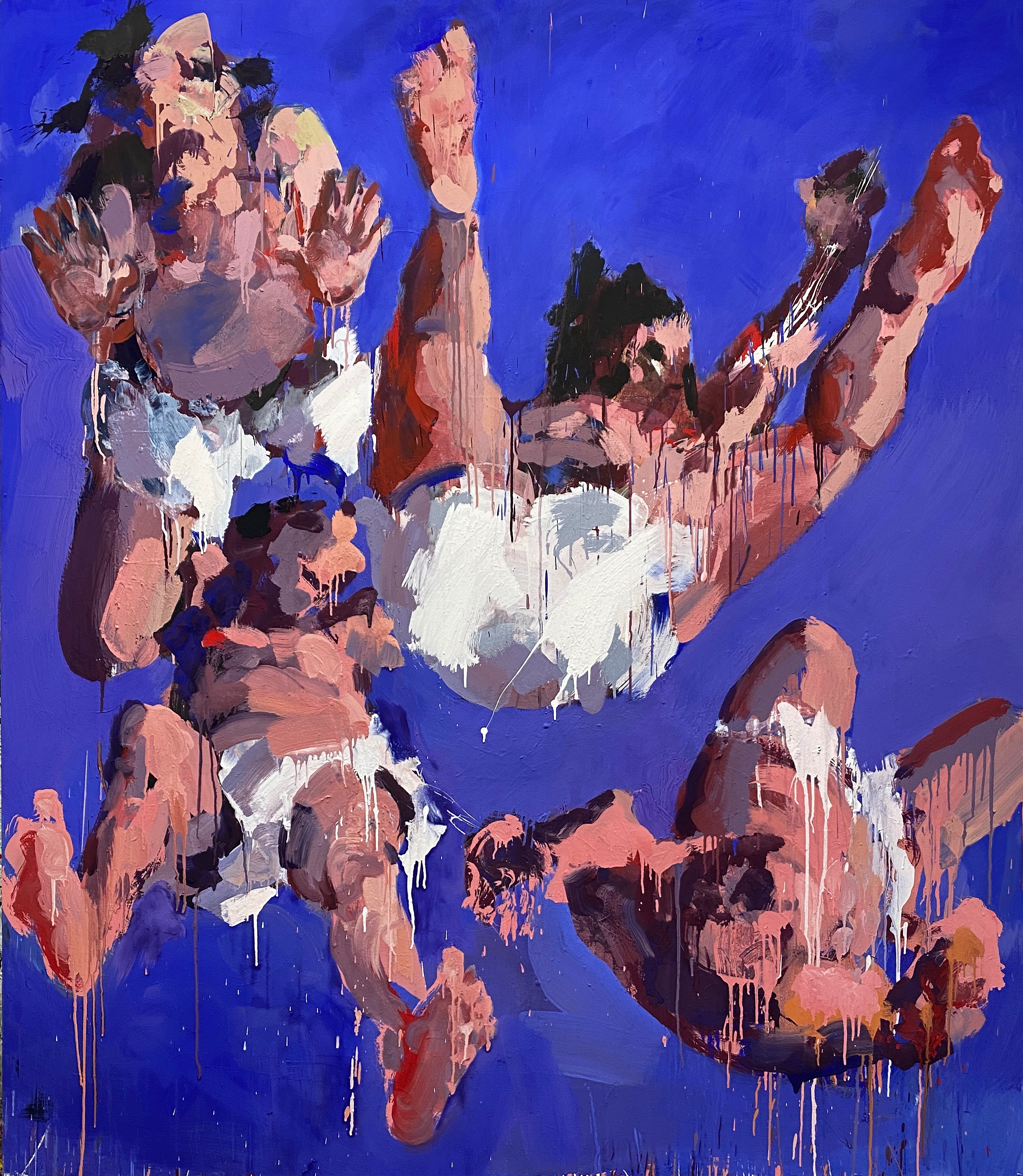
David Stern, The Sons of God, 2019. Acrylics and pigments on canvas, 81 x 71 inches.

During the COVID-19 pandemic, Stern created self-portraits in small format, at home as well as in the studio, in ink (mostly fountain pen) on paper, some washes and Japanese ink. All drawings measure 11 1/2 by 8 inches.

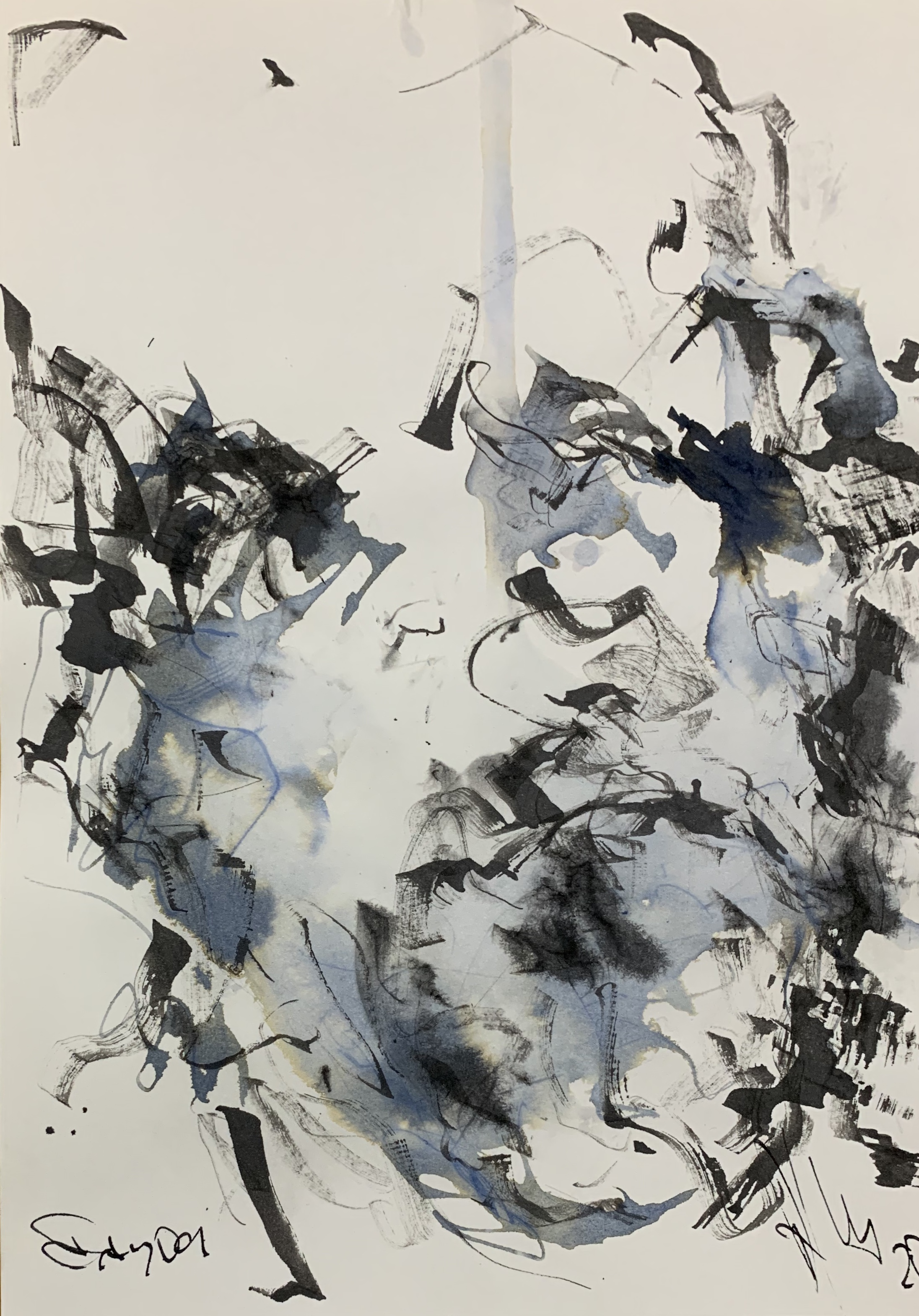
David Stern, Self Introspection Day 9, 2020. Black ink on paper, 11.5 x 8.25 inches, Private Collection

== Selected exhibitions ==
- 2023 David Stern, Lucille Khornak Gallery, Bridgehampton, NY, August 9–18, 2023
- 2023 David Stern. Myths and Archetypes, Cigar Factory, Long Island City, NY, May 11–31, 2023
- 2014 - 16 "The Gatherings" Diptych at September Memorial and Museum New York City
- 2010-12 David Stern: The American Years (1995–2008) (cont.) national traveling exhibition curated by Karen Wilkin, The Halsey Institute of Contemporary Art, Charleston, SC, August 26-October 8, 2010
- 2011 David Stern: Five Paintings, Messineo Art Projects/Wyman Contemporary, New York Jan 27 – March 19
- 2009 David Stern: Cold Cuts – The American Years, Galerie Brennecke, Berlin, October 24- December 3, 2009
- David Stern: Selections from “One Hundred Simple Things,”Messineo Art Projects/Wyman Contemporary, New York, May 14 – July 16
- 2008-09 David Stern: The American Years (1995–2008), national traveling exhibition curated by Karen Wilkin, Yeshiva University Museum, New York, September 18, 2008 – February 8, 2009
- Alexander Hogue Gallery, University of Tulsa, Tulsa, OK, October 30-November 28
- 2005-06 David Stern at the Starrett-Leihigh (project 1740), NYC presented by Claudia Carr Gallery, November 15-December 20
- 2004 David Stern: Braces and Shadows, Rosenberg + Kaufman Fine Art, NYC, April 28-June 3
- 2002 David Stern: The Gatherings, Rosenberg + Kaufman Fine Art, NYC, October 10-November 16
- 2001 David Stern: Common Ground, Rosenberg + Kaufman Fine Art, NYC, April 25-May 26
- 2000 David Stern: Recent Paintings, Louis Stern Gallery, Los Angeles, CA, April 27-June 3
- 1999 David Stern: Random Cycles, Rosenberg + Kaufman Fine Art, NYC, October 12-November 13
- David Stern: Recent Work, William Halsey Institute of Contemporary Art, College of Charleston, SC, September 2–25
- 1998 David Stern: New Paintings, Rosenberg + Kaufman Fine Art, NYC, April 28-May 30
- 1997 David Stern, Galerie Joachim Blüher, Cologne, Germany
- 1996 David Stern: Skypieces and Portraits, Rosenberg + Kaufman Fine Art, NYC, September 11-October 19
- 1995 David Stern: Drawings and Paintings, Synagogue for the Arts, NYC, May 10-June 11
- 1995 David Stern, Galerie Brennecke, Berlin, Germany
- 1994 David Stern, Kunstverein, Gütersloh, Germany, November 20 – December 11
- 1994 Identity and Relationship: Recent Paintings by David Stern, National Jewish Museum, Washington, DC, December 15 - January
- 1994 David Stern: Bilder, Galerie Brennecke, Berlin, Germany, October 14 – November 19
- 1993 David Stern: Malerei, Galerie X Sadie Bierl, Munich, Germany
- 1993 David Stern: Malerei, Galerie Brennecke, Berlin, Germany, January 23 – March 6
- 1992-93 David Stern: Tanulmányok egy útról (Study for a Way), Hungarian National Gallery, Budapest, Hungary, November 26, 1992 – January 7, 1993
- 1992 David Stern: Malerei, Kunstsammlung der Universität Göttingen, Göttingen, Germany, March 15 – April 26
- 1992 David Stern: Malerei, Galerie Welz, Salzburg, Austria, September 4 – September 29
- 1992 David Stern: Paintings, Martin Ainscough Gallery, Liverpool, England, October 3 – November 2

SELECTED GROUP EXHIBITIONS

- 2021 And Yet We Rise: 20 Years Remembrance of September 11, Embassy of the United States of America London, UK September 1 - March 7
- 2014 Painted Faces, Curated by Mark Lewis. Henry Zarrow Center for Art and Education, University of Tulsa, March 7 - April 13
- 2012 Positonswechsel, Curated by Kirsten Freundl. BayWa Munich, October 18 – November 10
- 2010 Works On Paper. Julia Nitsberg, David Stern, Sylvia Schuster, Messineo Art Projects and Wyman Contemporary, New York, May 13 - July 15
- 2008 National Juried Competition: Works of Art on Paper, Long Beach Island Foundation of the Arts & Sciences, June 21 –July 14
- 2006 New American Figurative Art. David Stern. Nicholas Straube, Thomas Williams Fine Arts, London, October 10- November 10
- 2003 Skin: Contemporary Views of the Body, Jacksonville Museum of Modern Art, Jacksonville, FL, May 2-August 3(with Magdalena Abakanowicz, Tony Oursler and others)
- 2002-03 CorpoRealities. Contemporary Figurative Painting, Rollins College, Cornell Fine Arts Museum, Winter Park, FL, October 18-December 1 (with Eugène Leroy, Frank Auerbach and others)
- 2002 Portraits. David Stern and Edvins Strautmanis. Drawings and Monoprints, Spokane Falls Community College Art Gallery, Spokane, WA, February 11-March 15
- 1998 7th Biennal National Drawing Invitational, The Arkansas Arts Center, Little Rock, AR, May 7-June 21
- 1998 Galerie Brennecke, Berlin, Germany
- 1997 About Face, Rosenberg + Kaufman Fine Art, NYC One of a Kind, Rosenberg + Kaufman Fine Art, NYC
- 1996 Galerie Joachim Blüher, Cologne, Germany Galerie Brennecke, Berlin, Germany
- 1993 Fritz Ascher – David Stern. Two Abstract-Figurative Painters, International Monetary Fund Art Forum, Washington, DCMarch 30 – May 21
- 1993 Galerie Seippel, Cologne, Germany
- 1989 Der Name der Freiheit. Ein Kölner Symposion zur 200-Jahr-Feier der Französischen Revolution in der KölnerPhilharmonie am 29. April 1989, Cologne, Germany

SELECTED PUBLICATIONS

- 2020 Jonathan Goodman, "David Stern. Line, Form, Passage" at Ellipsis Art, White Hot Magazine, 2020
- 2020 Jonathan Goodman, "David Stern. Composites of Geography, Composites of Form, Tussle Magazine, November 15, 2020
- 2013 David Stern, “In the Beginning was a Drawing… (Thoughts on Drawing and Binary Code)” and Chapter 14: “Black and White Magic by David Stern, New York, USA” in David Scott Leibowitz, Mobile Digital Art. Using the iPad and iPhone as Creative Tools, 2013
- 2011 Thomas Ketelsen, “Skypieces or ‘Epiphanien des Zufalls’. David Sterns New Yorker Skizzenbuch im Dresdner Kupferstich-Kabinett, in Dresden – New York. Zu Ehren des 90. Geburtstages von Henry H. Arnhold, By Nina C. Ilgen and Martin Roth (Editors), Berlin and Munich 2011, pp. 39–42
- 2008 David Stern: The American Years (1995–2008), catalogue accompanying the national traveling exhibition curated by Karen Wilkin; New York: YU Museum; Tulsa, OK: Alexandre Hogue Gallery; Charleston, SC: The Halsey Institute of Contemporary Art
- 1999 David Stern: Recent Paintings, Rosenberg + Kaufman Fine Art, NY
- 1994 David Stern, Identity and Relationship, National Jewish Museum, Washington, DC
- 1992 David Stern, Study for a Way, Hungarian National Gallery, Budapest David Stern, Malerei, Kunstsammlung der Universität Göttingen (Germany)
- 2009 Charles Ruas, “David Stern,” ARTnews, January 2009, p. 112
- 2008 Joel Silverstein, “David Stern at Yeshiva University Museum,” artcritical.com, December 2008
- Teel Sale and Claudia Betti, Drawing. A Contemporary Approach, 6th edition, Belmont, CA 2008, p. 34, no. 2.12
- 2007 Monica Strauss, “David Stern. Rituelle Gesten,” Aufbau, September 2007, p. 10
- 2005 Lonnie Pierson Dunbier (Editor), The Artists Bluebook. 34,000 North American Artists. 16th Century to March 2005, Scottsdale(Arizona), 2005, p. 479
- 2004 David Grosz, "Human Figures, Broken and Restored, In the Work of One Artist," Forward, March 19, 2004, p. 11
- 2003 Karen Wilkin, "At the Galleries," Partisan Review, Winter 2003, pp. 116–17
- 2002 Blake Eskin, “A Passion for Impasto,” ARTnews Summer 2002, pp. 122–124
- Monica Strauss, "Revisiting those stunned evenings," Aufbau,5 September 2002
- 2001 Monica Strauss, "Figurative Paintings and Abstract Means. Paintings and Drawings by David Stern at Rosenberg & Kaufman Fine Art,"Aufbau 10 (May 10), 2001, p. 15
- Mario Naves, “Waving to the 20th Century en Route to the 19th,”The New York Observer, May 20
- Karen Wilkin, "At the Galleries," Partisan Review, Summer 2001
- 2000 Lance Esplund, "David Stern at Rosenberg & Kaufman", Art in America, June 2000, pp. 124–25
- 1999 Mitchell Cohen, "David Stern's Cosmos", Dissent, Fall 1999, pp. 64–67
- Frank Martin, "Stern's art like a thrill ride of texture, color and imagery", The Post and Courier, September 18, 1999, p. 2D
- 1998 Lance Esplund, "Working the Paint," Modern Painters, Spring 1998, pp. 116–18
- 1998 Townsend Wolfe, "David Stern," in 7th Biennal National Drawing Invitational, exh. cat. (Little Rock: The Arkansas Arts Center), pp. 57–59, nos. 38–43
- 1997 Hearne Pardee, "David Stern," ARTnews, January 1997, pp. 119–121
- 1996 Dominique Nahas, "David Stern," Review, October 1, 1996, p. 16
- Jeanne C. Wilkinson, David Stern," Review, September 15, 1996, p. 28
- 1995 Sascha Brodsky, "Artist looks beyond Abstract Expressionism," Downtown Express, May 16–29, 1995, p. 27
- 1994 Rolf Birkholz, "Das Ringen der Geschlechter," Gütersloher Tagesblatt, November 20, 1994, p. 994
- "Ausstellungsrundgang," Tagesspiegel Berlin, November 5
- C.J. "Tobende Farben," Süddeutsche Zeitung, October 7, 1994
- 1993 Christina Wendenburg, "Wie sich aus einem Krater Gesichter herausschälen," Berliner Morgenpost, February 2, 1993
- Prof. Dr. Karl Arndt, "On David Stern's Paintings – Observations and Thoughts" in Fritz Ascher – David Stern. Two abstract-figurative painters, exh. cat. Washington, DC: International Monetary Fund Art Forum
- Feature, Sonntagsgespräche with Karl L. Wolff, WDR Television
- 1992 Jürgen Kisters, "Vom Zauber der Erfahrung. Der Kölner Maler David Stern bereitet eine Ausstellung in Budapest vor," Kölner Stadt-Anzeiger, October 16
- Peter Krüger-Lenz, "Aufgeworfen, schrundig. Malerei von David Stern in der Uni-Kunstsammlung", Göttinger Tageblatt, March 1992
- Cornel Wachter, "Die Schichten der Erscheinungen durchdringen." Göttinger Tageblatt, March 11, 1992
- 1991 Jürgen Kisters, "David Stern – Portrait eines Künstlers," Kunst Köln, 4, 1991, pp. 34–37
- Jürgen Kisters, "David Stern," Kunstforum, September 1991, p. 366
- 1990 Wim Cox, Kölner Künstler im Portrait, Cologne, pp. 200–203
- 1989 Franz Xaver Ohnesorg, "Der Name der Freiheit. Ein Kölner Symposion zur 200-Jahr-Feier der Französischen Revolution in der Kölner Philharmonie am 29. April 1989," KölnMusik Edition 1, Köln, 1989, pp. 40–41
- Künstler in Köln, Artothek der Stadtbücherei Köln, Cologne
- 1988 Feature, Aktuelle Stunde, WDR 3 Television

== Sources ==
- This article incorporates text available under the CC BY-SA 3.0 license. Text is also released under the GNU Free Documentation License (GFDL).
- David Stern, “In the Beginning was a Drawing… (Thoughts on Drawing and Binary Code)” and Chapter 14: “Black and White Magic by David Stern, New York, USA” in David Scott Leibowitz, Mobile Digital Art. Using the iPad and iPhone as Creative Tools, 2013, ISBN 0240825020, ISBN 978-0240825021
- David Stern, heroes and graces, New York 2013 http://www.blurb.com/b/4234682-david-stern-heros-and-graces
- Thomas Ketelsen, “Skypieces or ‘Epiphanien des Zufalls’. David Sterns New Yorker Skizzenbuch im Dresdner Kupferstich-Kabinett, in Nina C. Illgen, Martin Roth: Dresden – New York: zu Ehren des 90. Geburtstages von Henry H. Arnhold. Dt. Kunstverlag, Berlin/Munich 2011
- Karen Wilkin and Lance Esplund in David Stern: The American Years (1995–2008), New York: Yeshiva University Museum (2008/2009); Tulsa, OK: Alexandre Hogue Gallery(2008); Phoenix, AZ: Phoenix College (2010); Charleston, SC: William Halsey Institute of Contemporary Art (2010), ISBN 978-0-615-21645-4
- Teel Sale and Claudia Betti, Drawing. A Contemporary Approach, 6th edition, Belmont, CA 2008, p. 34, no. 2.12, ISBN 978-0-15-501580-7
- Lonnie Pierson Dunbier (Editor), The Artists Bluebook. 34,000 North American Artists. 16th Century to March 2005, Scottsdale (Arizona), 2005, p. 479
- Karen Wilkin and Mitchell Cohen in David Stern: Recent Paintings, New York: Rosenberg + Kaufman Fine Art 1999
- Marc Scheps and Ori Z. Soltes in David Stern: Identity and Relationship, Washington, DC: National Jewish Museum 1994
- Justus Bierich and Cornel Wachter (Hrsg.), David Stern: Studie für einen Weg/Tanulmany egy utrol/Study for a way 1987-1992, Budapest: Hungarian National Gallery 1992, mit Beiträgen von Lorand Bereczky, Werner Schmalenbach, Karl Arndt, Avraham Ehrlich und Jürgen Kisters, Kunstverlag Wolfrum Wien 1992
- Karl Arndt and Gudrun Meyer, David Stern: Malerei, Göttingen: Kunstsammlung der Universität Göttingen 1992
