= Extreme (2009 TV series) =

2009 American television series

Extreme is a 2009 television series that aired on the Travel Channel. The series covered so-called extreme activities that features "the absolute best of what the US of A has to offer—to the total EXTREME". Produced by Sharp Entertainment, the show traveled around the United States to document and showcase various places, events, things and people that are "extreme" in some way.

== Episodes ==
- Extreme Places to Go Green
- Extreme SeaWorld – SeaWorld Orlando – Kraken roller coaster, Aquatica Waterpark, Discovery Cove, After Dark, Journey to Atlantis water coaster, Shark Encounter
- Extreme Ways to Go Green
- Extreme Water Parks – Noah's Ark, Schlitterbahn, World Waterpark at West Edmonton Mall, Disney's Blizzard Beach, Wet 'n Wild – Orlando, Six Flags Hurricane Harbor and Six Flags White Water.
- Extreme Terror Rides – Stratosphere Las Vegas, Cedar Point in Sandusky, Ohio, Extreme World in Wisconsin Dells, Wisconsin, Fahrenheit roller coaster in Hershey, Pennsylvania, Kings Island in Cincinnati, Galaxyland in Edmonton, Alberta, Canada and Six Flags Great Adventure in Jackson, New Jersey.
- Extreme Superstores – Jungle Jim's International Market, Archie McPhee, REI in Seattle, Unclaimed Baggage Store in Scottsboro, Alabama, Bonanza Gifts in Las Vegas, Daffin's Candy in Sharon, Pennsylvania, San Jose Flea Market and Cabela's.
- Extreme Truck Stops – Iowa 80 in Walcott, Iowa, Seven Feathers Truck and Travel Center in Canyonville, Oregon, Mid-America Truck Show in Louisville, Kentucky, 75 Chrome Shop in Wildwood, Florida, Billy Bob's Texas in Fort Worth, Texas, Lee Hi Travel Plaza in Lexington, Virginia, South of the Border Truck Stop on the Border of North and South Carolina, Trapper's Kettle in Belfield, North Dakota and Little America in Cheyenne, Wyoming.
- Extreme Mind-Blowing Hotels – The Nordic Inn in Crosby, Minnesota, Out 'n' About in Takilma, Oregon, The Madonna Inn, The Lizzie Borden Bed & Breakfast, The Palms Hotel's Fantasy Tower, Dunton Hot Springs, Winvian in Morris, Connecticut and The Aurora Ice Museum 60 miles from Fairbanks, Alaska.
- Extreme Pig Outs – Denny's Beer Barrel Pub in Clearfield, Pennsylvania, Country Pancake House in Ridgewood, New Jersey, The Chip Shop, Brooklyn, New York, Big Mama's & Papa's Pizzeria in California, Ben & Jerry's in Waterbury, Vermont, Jack-n-Grill in Denver, Colorado, R. U. Hungry in New Brunswick, New Jersey and Heart Attack Grill in Chandler, Arizona
- Extreme Bathrooms – J.C. Decaux Automatic Self-Cleaning Toilets in San Francisco, Glass Lounge Ninja New York and Peep in New York City, John Michael Kohler Arts Center in Sheboygan, Wisconsin, Habana Outpost in Brooklyn, New York, Shoji Tabuchi Theater in Branson, Missouri, The Madonna Inn in San Luis Obispo, California and Urban Ecology in Milwaukee, Wisconsin
- Extreme Adrenaline Rushes – Biplane Thrill Rides in Ventura, California, The Olympic Luge in Lake Placid, New York, Dale Jarrett Racing Adventures in Talladega, Alabama, Extreme Seal Experience in Chesapeake, Virginia, Zero G in Las Vegas, Air Combat USA in Fullerton, California and Canyon Swing in Queenstown, New Zealand
- Extreme Restaurants – Ninja New York in New York Dark Dining and Supper Club in San Francisco, California Modern Toilet in Taipei, Taiwan Catfish Plantation in Waxahachie, Texas Safe House Restaurant in Milwaukee and Ithaa Undersea in The Republic of the Maldives
- Extreme Workplaces
- Extreme Fast Food – Voodoo Doughnut, Sonic Drive-In, Waffle Cabin in Okemo, Vermont, The Wieners Circle, Bamn! Automat in New York City, Cluck-U Chicken in New Brunswick, New Jersey, KFC and Cowgirls Espresso in Seattle.
- Extreme Playtime – Salomon Center in Ogden, Utah, and Sky Mania in Las Vegas, Nevada, Innespace in Redding, California, Lake Cunningham Regional Skate Park in San Jose, California, CPX Sports in Chicago and Zorb Globe Riding in Pigeon Forge, Tennessee
- Extreme Roadside Adventures – Pigeon Forge, Tennessee, Autohof Strohofer in Geiselwind, Germany, Weeki Wachee Springs State Park, Hawaiian Rumble in Myrtle Beach, South Carolina, Rooster Cogburn Ostrich Ranch in Picacho, Arizona, Leila's Hair Museum in Independence, Missouri, Wall Drug and House on the Rock.
- Extreme Towns – Hell, Michigan, Cassadaga, Florida, Greater World Community in Taos, New Mexico, Metropolis, Illinois, Maharishi Vedic City, Iowa and North Pole, Alaska.
- Extreme Animal Encounters – Alligator Wrestling in Orlando, Florida, Noodling in Pauls Valley, Oklahoma, Leech Therapy in New York City, Bull Riding in Summerville, Georgia, Ostrich Racing in Oudtshoorn, South Africa, Bee-Healing in Grand Rapids, Michigan, Monkey Jungle in Miami, and Shark Diving in San Francisco
- Extreme Pools – The Crater in Midway, Utah, San Alfonso del Mar in Algarrobo, Chile, Hotel Grace in New York City, Beer Pool in Tarrenz, Austria, Icon Brickell in Miami, Nemo 33 in Brussels, Belgium, NASA Pool in Houston, Kitchukov Private Pool in Gilbert, Arizona and Golden Nugget Pool in Las Vegas
- Extreme Vegas – Skydive Wedding in Skydive Las Vegas, Aureole's Wine Tower in Mandalay Bay, The Pleasure Pit in Planet Hollywood, Thrill Rides in The Stratosphere, The Four by Four by Two in RM Seafood, The Neon Museum, Carnival Buffet in Rio All Suite Hotel and Casino and Minus 5 in Mandalay Bay
- Extreme Miami Hotspots – Extreme Performance in Circ X, Extreme Burial in Neptune Memorial Reef, Extreme Butler in The Ritz-Carlton, Extreme Residence in Acqua Liana, Extreme Vending in The Mondrian Hotel, Extreme Eats in Sarussi Restaurant, Extreme Makeover in The Miami Institute, Extreme Party in Calle Ocho and Extreme Dining in Dinner in the Sky
- Extreme Bar Hopping – PDT in New York City, Umbrella Bar in Squaw Valley, California, Slide and The Tonga Room and Hurricane Bar in San Francisco, California, Noir Bar and Moon Nightclub in Las Vegas, Clo Wine Bar in New York, Jean Lafitte's Blacksmith Shop in New Orleans Club Watt in Rotterdam, Netherlands, XS in Las Vegas and Ice Bar in Orlando, Florida
- Extreme Wild Parties – Quebec Winter Carnival in Québec City, Québec, Canada, Club La Vela in Panama City Beach, Florida, St Patrick Day Pub Crawl in Charlotte, North Carolina, Red Hat Society in Fullerton, California, American Museum of Natural History in New York City
- Extreme Resorts (Premiers Aug. 12, 2009) – Wilderness Territory; Ski Dubai; ACE Adventure Resort in Oak Hill, West Virginia; The Nickelodeon Family Suites; Star Island; Fontainebleau; Igloo Village in Zermatt, Switzerland; Genting City of Entertainment in Genting Highlands, Malaysia.
- Extreme Terror Rides: Death-Defying Drops – Holiday World's The Voyage; Indiana Beach's Steel Hawg
- Extreme Terror Rides: Mega Speed – Snake River Adventures, Hades at Mt. Olympus Water & Theme Park, Skycoaster at Fun Spot USA, Steel Dragon 2000 at Nagashima Spa Land, ring°racer at the Nürburgring
- Extreme Conventions
- Extreme Massive Lodges – Hummell Cottages in Orlando, Florida, Six Flags Inn in Boston, My Family's Got GUTS Suites in New York City, Great Wolf Lodge in Lake George, New York, Time Machine Thrills & Hotel in New York City, Amazing Icy Museum in Anchorage, Alaska and Paper Airplane Inn in Beijing, China.
- Extreme Wild Rides: Thrills and Spills
- Extreme Hong Kong Adventures
- Extreme Roller Coasters
- Extreme Playgrounds
- Extreme Bedrooms
- Extreme Hawaiian Escapes
- Extreme Tours
