= Marvin =

Marvin may refer to:

== Geography ==
In the United States

- Marvyn, Alabama, also spelled Marvin, an unincorporated community
- Marvin, Missouri, an unincorporated community
- Marvin, North Carolina, a village
- Marvin, South Dakota, a town
- Robley, Virginia, also known as Marvin
- Lake Marvin, a lake in Georgia

Elsewhere

- Marvin Islands, Nunavut, Canada

== People and fictional characters ==
- Marvin (given name), including a list of people and fictional characters
- Marvin (surname), including a list of people and fictional characters
- Marvin the Paranoid Android, character in The Hitchhiker's Guide to the Galaxy

== Arts and entertainment ==
- Marvin the Album, an album by the Australian group Frente!
- Marvin K. Mooney Will You Please Go Now!, children's rhyme book by Dr. Suess
- "Marvin (Patches)", a song by Titãs
- "Marvin", song by Marvin the Paranoid Android (1981)
- Marvin (film), a 2017 French film
- Marvin (comic), a newspaper comic strip

== Other uses ==
- Marvin (robot), developed by the University of Kaiserslautern Robotics Research Lab in Germany

== See also ==
- Marven Gardens, a housing area in Margate City, New Jersey, in the United States, known for its appearance in the board game Monopoly.
- Marvin the Martian, an extraterrestrial character from Warner Bros.' cartoons
