= Marvin Stuart Antelman =

American-Israeli rabbi and chemist

- מרווין סטיוארט אנטלמן
- Rabbi Marvin S. Antelman, middle, presiding as Chief Justice of a court of five members from his Supreme Rabbinical Court of America convened at its 1976 excommunication proceedings. Seated at his right is Rabbi Herbert J. Gilner with the shofar that is blown as part of the proceeding.
- Born: January 10, 1933 (12 Tevet 5694); Camden, NJ
- Died: October 12, 2013 (aged 80) (8 Cheshvan 5774); Israel
- Title: Posek, Rabbi, Dr.
- Spouse: Sylvia Joyce Antelman
- Children: 4
- Parent: Aharon

Marvin Stuart Antelman (Hebrew: מרווין סטיוארט אנטלמן; January 10, 1933 – September 11, 2013) was an American-Israeli rabbi, and chemist.

== Birth and residence ==
Marvin Stuart Antelman was born January 10, 1933, in Camden, New Jersey, to husband and wife Harry and Anna Antelman (both born in Romania), who were proprietor and finisher, respectively, of retail furs. In 1990 he resided in Providence, RI and in 2000, the Boston suburb of Weymouth.

== Author of chemistry encyclopedias ==
Antelman authored two encyclopedias: The analytical encyclopedia of thermoplastic materials (1974) and The encyclopedia of chemical electrode potentials (New York, 1982; as of July 2020 this latter book had 359 records in Worldcat and 181 academic citations).

== Patents ==
Antelman's U.S. patents number approximately fifteen. Many of them involve mixed-valence complex metal oxides and their application to skin conditions or cancers, and/or as antimicrobials or water treatments.

=== Patent 5,676,977 ===
In 1996 Antelman filed U.S. Patent 5,676,977, "Method of curing AIDS with tetrasilver tetroxide molecular crystal devices." The patent claims the ability to cure AIDS with a single injection of tetrasilver tetroxide (trademarked Tetrasil by Marantech Holding Company, LLC). In 2001 he filed an improvement on to patent 5,676,977 that minimized side effects such as hepatotoxicity by slowing the rate of injection. The tetrasilver tetroxide patents claim that some clinical trials were performed in Honduras. Responses to Patent 5,676,977 have ranged from the neutral, namely those who note that a patent doesn't mean the device works or is effective, but rather only reserves the intellectual and property right of the inventor of something with some degree of plausibility - to those who decry it as utter quackery, to those who claim it cures AIDS or eliminates HIV and is being censored and suppressed by Big Pharma and governments. Nevertheless, it has received a considerable attention and discussion in social media due to memes and videos with captions like "AIDS CURE FOUND! U.S. Patent # 5676977."

== Works in religion and politics ==
In March 1961 the New England Region of the NCSY was formed, and its records list "First Youth Commission Chair: Dr. Marvin Antelman a”h." In 1971, Antelman was one of the founders (along with Allan Eliyahu Mallenbaum) of the Jewish Survival Legion (JSL), which split with the Kahanist organization Jewish Defense League in order to solve many of the same problems confronted by the JDL but to do so in a way "within the framework of the law." The JSL was affiliated with the nationalist and religious Zionist groups Herut and Betar.

In 1976 in a New York Hilton hotel hall Antelman as Chief Justice of his Supreme Rabbinic Court of America (SRCA) presided with four other rabbinic judges and performed a solemn excommunication of Henry Kissinger from Judaism, on account of anti-Jewish and anti-American actions that the Council alleged. The audience reaction is reported to have been very intense and that for many of the audience members it was the first time they had witnessed an actual excommunication. The story was later picked up by and reported in other American and international weeklies including the National Enquirer and Paris Match In November 1982 Antelman's Beit Din excommunicated hundreds more Jews on account of co-signing a pro-PLO and pro-homosexual rights advertisement placed in the June 20 New York Times or for belonging to a certain group aligned with the ad. Antelman's court deemed this to be a promotion of Marxist views on Israel and sex and thus a collaboration with the enemies of Judaism and a treasonous act. The Washington Post article about the excommunication event describes "the mainstream Jewish community" as not regarding the ceremony seriously.

Regarding the Sabbatean controversy involving Jacob Emden and Yonatan Eybeschütz, Antelman maintained a very decisive position upholding the 20 Sivan 1756 Council of Four Lands cherem (excommunication) against Eybeschütz and its ban of all his writings, and he published a book about it c. 1990 in Tel Aviv. He decries an "insidious ... cover-up of the excommunication of Rabbi Jonathan Eybeschutz (1690-1764)" for "seduction to Sabbatian Frankist idolatry" and of the council's banning of Eybeschütz's books (Vol. 2 p. 7). Antelman's SRCA again cites this excommunication in its own declaration and excommunications.

Antelman is also known for promoting a novel ruling allowing a beit din to serve a Jewish divorce to a wife where the divorce is beneficial and the man is unwilling, on the basis that the court may perform a transaction on behalf of a man if it is to his benefit, and a book by him was published about this in 1994 in Tel Aviv.

=== To Eliminate the Opiate ===
To Eliminate the Opiate
- Author: Marvin Stuart Antelman
- Cover artist: Sylvia Antelman
- Language: English
- Genre: Non-fiction
- Publisher: Zionist Book Club
- Publication date: 1974
- Publication place: United States
- Media type: Print
- Pages: 185 pp.
- ISBN: 978-1717749512

In 1974 Antelman published Volume One of a book titled To Eliminate the Opiate. It has been called "the first well-presented history of the conspiratorial efforts to subvert and undermine Judaism." Taking its name from Marx's Opium of the people statement about religion, the book claims to trace the roots and offshoots of Sabbatean, Frankist, and Illuminati groups and their interrelationships in regard to the origin of Marxist, Communist, and geopolitical and financial forces that have been aimed at destroying religion, particularly Judaism and Christianity. The book claims that these groups are loosely aligned but that they conspire to eliminate traditional Judaism and Christianity and install a secular, Marxist tyranny a la Plato's Republic.

Antelman says what prompted him to write the book was a period of violent acts against religious Jews that resulted in the destruction of Boston's Jewish community between 1968 and 1971. He claimed that when he confronted and investigated these acts and their perpetrators he discovered them to be linked to and funded by Communist and other conspiratorial Marxist groups. Volume 1 might not have received much attention or impact until the publication of Volume 2. The latter was not published until 2002 due to, by Antelman's accounts therein (Introduction), fierce accusations of libel and so forth from the accusing individuals (notably, primarily, and initially Elma Lewis (1921–2004)) that beset him resulting from the publication of Volume 1, and regarding these attacks he gave acknowledgement to God for giving him the strength and knowledge to fight them off in the secular courts. In this introduction he also states he was encouraged by the advice of a friend who told him God had allowed these attacks and challenges to be sent to him so that he should overcome them, and that with his Torah erudition he would surely be able to learn the legal codes and represent himself to defend against these attacks which would have otherwise caused him bankruptcy and ruin had he needed to hire lawyers in his defense. The cover of the book was designed by Antelman's wife Sylvia. To Eliminate the Opiate reports many rare, obscure, or conspiracy theory type elements of Sabbatean and Frankist exploits. Billy Jack Dial, a prominent Noahide leader, featured this book prominently on the front page of his website in 2006 and wrote, "These books are available at Shop.BnaiNoach.com [now defunct], and happen to be one of the most powerful resource of truth of all times. Here Rabbi Marvin S. Antelman confronts the evil empire with the revelation of truth, and defies all the conspiracy theories and transforms those theories into reality. These books will leave the reader shocked and awed as the cloak of secrecy is stripped off of the organizations and individuals who actively sought to bring harm to the Torah of G-d, and its followers."

Reception, notability, influences and criticism

Volume 2, published in 2002 the midst of the Second Intifada, received significant attention, particularly among religious Zionists faced with external battles and with perceived internal betrayals from state of Israel leadership and failure of so-called peace processes. Following are some of the more notable attention and comments that the book received from prominent members of Israeli or Jewish press entities:

- In 2002 American-Israeli author Barry Chamish wrote in his newsletter, "We all owe a huge debt to Rabbi Marvin Antelman, the first Jew to try to decipher the real conspiracy to destroy Jews and Judaism, which, as we all know, is in full swing today. Way back in 1974, before any of us had heard of the illuminati or the Council On Foreign Relations (CFR), Rabbi Antelman published his book To Eliminate The Opiate and exposed their covert war against religion, focusing on their battle plan to extinguish Judaism, but with great implications for Christianity as well. This book is now found on literally all the lists of classic conspiracy literature."
- In the June 20, 2006, episode of the syndicated radio program the Tamar Yonah Show in which the American-Israeli investigative reporter Tamar Yonah probes "what are the forces driving world events," the bulk of the 46 minute show was dedicated to her in-studio "very, very, very, very special guest" Marvin Antelman and an interview about his book, along with some discussion regarding recent events and geopolitics. At minute 22 of the show before the commercial break she referred to the book as, "the famous book, classic book,To Eliminate the Opiate"
- A September 15, 2009, post urging the book as a must-read for all Jews, posted on JTF.org, a forum associated with the ultra-nationalist Kahanist group Jewish Task Force, received 37 replies in the 32 days of the thread, and has been viewed at least 19,000 times according to the webpage as of Aug. 2022.

Over the years and to an increasing degree, the book has received many references by conspiracy theory authors and groups and on blogs and social media of diverse unaffiliated groups ranging from those focusing on Central Banks, to the origin of the Illuminati, and from individuals of religious Zionist persuasions to the Christian or secular, to the former KKK Grand Wizard and far-right politician popularly known as an antisemite and white supremicist David Duke. For example:

- The highest-frequency author citing To Eliminate the Opiate in an August 2022 search of Internet Archive is David Duke in archives of his books My Awakening (1998), Jewish Supremacy (2003), and The Secret Behind Communism (2013).
- Popular conspiracy theorist author David Icke's 2019 book about 9/11 "The Trigger," cites Antelman extensively in tracing the conspirators or antagonists that he calls "The Death Cult."

=== Participation in the 2004 attempt to revive the Sanhedrin, and surrounding controversies ===
The August 13, 2006, newsletter of the Chabad-affiliated group JAHG-USA (Jews and Hasidic Gentiles – United to Save America), having domain name www.noahide.com, mentions in a complex "Subversion Alert" about the aspiring Sanhedrin body, that Rabbi Antelman, one of the body's founders, had resigned, "protesting the increasingly open R & B influence on the 'Sanhedrin.'" "R & B" in the newsletter refers to the Root and Branch Association which the newsletter accuses of being controlled by Communist forces and having Marxist agents. The newsletter claims that due to its earlier "exposure" of the R & B, Noahide leader Billy Jack Dial, whom the newsletter accuses of being an agent of the R & B, had resigned from the Sanhedrin's "Noahide Council" just a few weeks earlier. However, in 2006 Dial's website www.bnainoach.com was prominently featuring, endorsing and selling Antelman's two-volume set To Eliminate the Opiate on its home page.

== Later life ==
Antelman was a Religious Zionist and last lived in Israel, passing on Oct. 12 (8 Cheshvan), 2013.
