= Hydrocarbon Pollution Remediation Project =

Hyprep is a remediation initiative developed to clean up Ogoniland

Hydrocarbon Pollution Remediation Project (HYPREP) is a body under the Federal Ministry of Environment, Nigeria. The initiative was first established in 2011 during the administration of President Goodluck Jonathan. Following the expiration of its initial ad hoc tenure, it was revived in 2015 under the administration of President Muhammadu Buhari. Its continuation beyond the current term may depend on future government decisions, including whether the administration of President Bola Tinubu or a subsequent administration chooses to renew or recreate it.

Hydrocarbon Pollution Remediation Project (HYPREP) main aim is to remediate soil and groundwater contamination in Ogoniland and impacted communities, promoting local capacity building and environmental awareness. Hydrocarbon Pollution Remediation Project (HYPREP) seeks to ensure the sustainable livelihoods and development while fostering security and peace-building efforts.

On the 2nd of June 2016, Hydrocarbon Pollution Remediation Project (HYPREP) when launched started a clean-up at Bodo Waterfront. and in the year 2017, HYPREP Project Coordination Office was built with Nenibarini Zabbey as the project coordinator.

HYPREP has built water projects in 49 communities in Ogoni Land and Ebubu is one of the community that has this water facility built by HYPREP. This water project is to ensure that Ogoni people have a good water to drink. HYPREP has also empowered thousands of Ogoni youth with skills and has made progress in restoring degraded land, mangroves, and livelihoods, while safeguarding public health in Ogoni. In 2026 HYPREP marked 10 years Anniversary.

In the year 2025, Muekara Monday the Executive Director of Greenshield Foundation for Ecosystem Restoration and Wildlife Conservation led a community protest against HYPREP and the Federal Government demanding accountability and transparency in Ogoni cleanup and Mr. Mike Gbarale who Executive Director of Rainbow Watch and Development Centre made a statement that any unjust attack on HYPREP was an attack on Ogoni people. Alexander Emmanuel who is the Director of Human Resources at the Federal Ministry of Environment, responded to the Protest by apologizing for the lack of response and took responsibility for the lapse.

During President Muhammadu BuhariTenure, Marvin Dekil was appointed by Nigerian President Muhammadu Buhari Founding Project Coordinator HYPREP, to lead the first ever Government of Nigeria oil pollution clean up programme, Hydrocarbon Pollution Remediation Project (HYPREP) and implement recommendations of the United Nations Environment Programme UNEP report on Ogoniland.
