= Marvin Hayes =

Marvin Hayes may refer to:

- Marvin Hayes (basketball) (born 1986), Filipino basketball player
- Marvin Hayes (painter) (born 1939), American painter and illustrator
