= Marvin Gauci =

Maltese chef

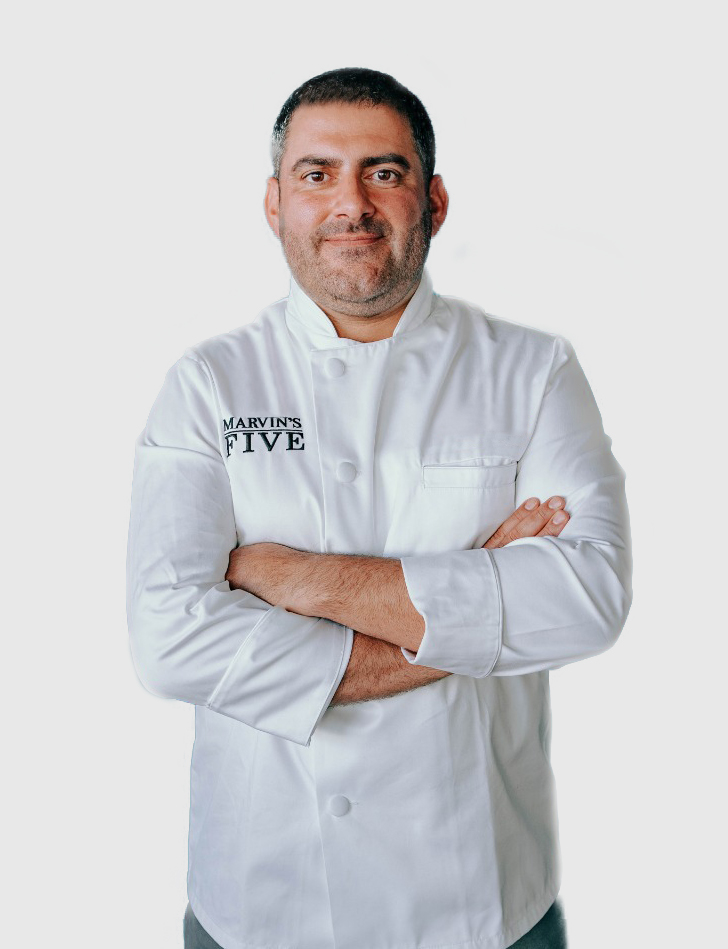
- Culinary career
- Cooking style: Maltese cuisine
- Current restaurants: Tarragon; Caviar & Bull; Susurrus; Dinner in the Sky; Caviar & Bull Budapest; Uncensored
- Website: marvingauci.com

Marvin Gauci is a chef and restaurateur from Malta. He also serves as the chief chef of the Dinner in the Sky in Malta. Gauci is the Ambassador of Gastronomy, serving as an official representative in foreign and domestic affairs for Malta.

== Biography ==
After completing secondary school, Gauci started his formal education at the Institute for Tourism Studies. In 1997, he traveled to Ireland to pursue his career where he worked first 6 months in a catering service before joining the Buswells Hotel which is a Georgian hotel that dates back to 1882 and is located next to the Dáil in Dublin, Ireland.

Later he came back to Malta where he opened his first restaurant, Wild Thyme in Xemxija. Then he started operating four of Malta’s most successful eateries. In 2007 he launched Tarragon in St Paul's Bay followed by Caviar & Bull in 2014 that is located in Saint Julian's and Buddhamann in 2015 which was later closed and replaced with a new restaurant named Sussurus.

In 2016, Marvin joined the Dinner in the Sky as a chef in Malta which is a novelty restaurant service that uses a crane to hoist its diners, table, and waiting staff 150 feet (46 m) into the air and has been named as one of the world's ten most unusual restaurants by the Forbes magazine. In the following year he joined the historic hotel, Corinthia Hotel Budapest.

He has collaborated with chef Ferran Adrià and worked in Hakkasan, Skylon, Santini and Novikov up-market restaurants in central London and cooked in different restaurants in Greece, France, Italy, Spain, Ireland, Austria and the UK. He was the chief chef for the Commonwealth Heads of Government Meeting 2018.

In 2018, Marvin was awarded the Best Chef of the Year by the Best of Budapest and Hungary Awards organization.
