= Ebubu =

Community in Rivers State, Nigeria

Ebubu is a community located in Eleme local government of Rivers state, Nigeria. Ebubu as a community in Eleme Local government shares Boundary with Eteol, Ogale and Onne.

Ebubu community has a water facility build The Hydrocarbon Pollution Remediation Project (HYPREP) and in the year 2022 HYPREP decided to strengthen the security around this project due to communal crisis. Ebubu as a community has experience a lot of Communal crisis and killings in the past years which have claim lives.
