= Muekara Monday =

Nigerian conservationist (born 1995)

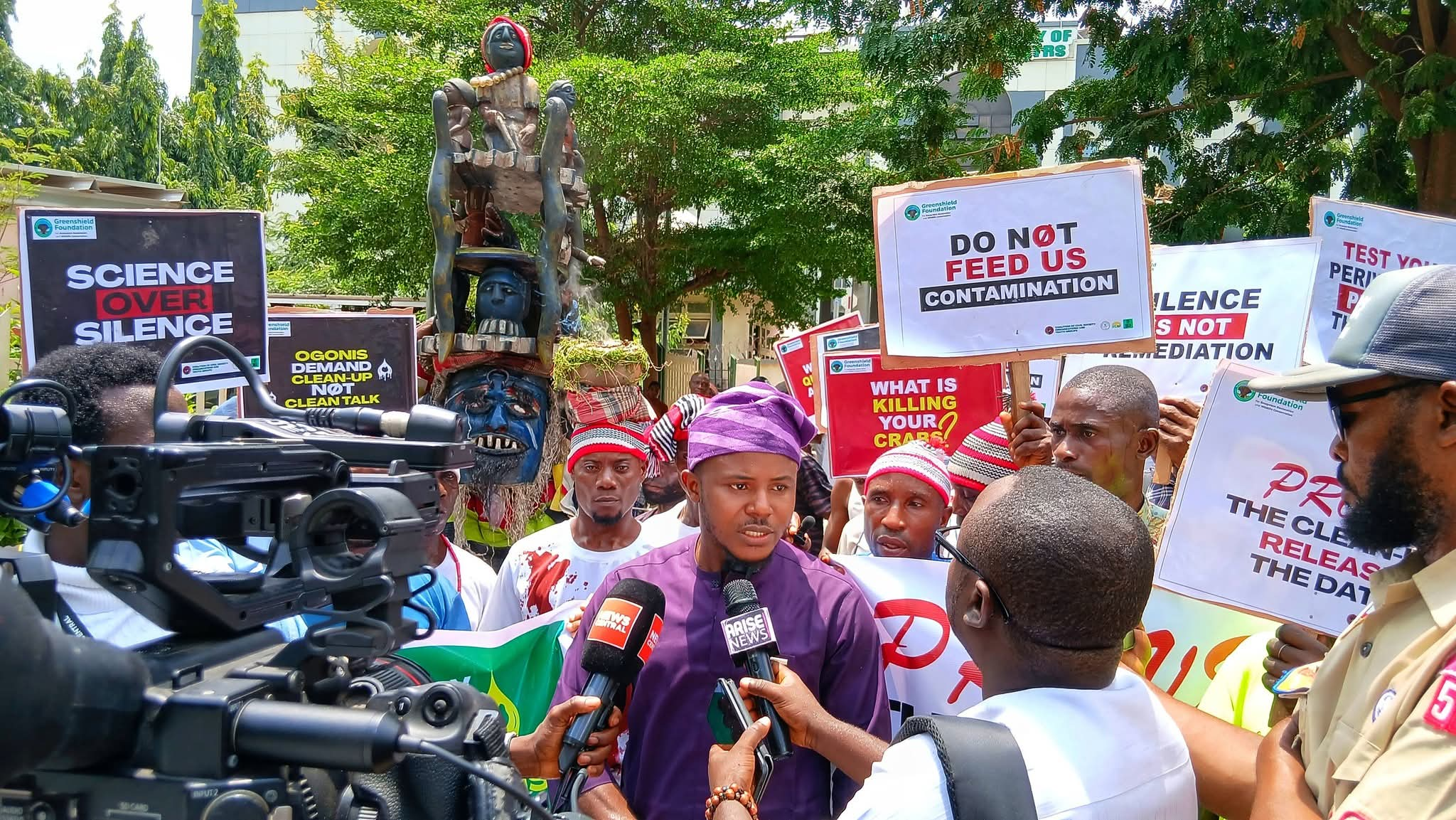
- Muekara Monday speaking to media in May 2026
- Born: January 1995 (age 31); Khana, Rivers State, Nigeria
- Education: University of Port Harcourt

Muekara Monday is a Nigerian environmental advocate, conservationist, entrepreneur, and community development practitioner. His work focuses on restoring the degraded Niger Delta ecosystem, biodiversity conservation, and ensuring that the community are well represented in environmental governance.

== Early life ==
Muekara Monday was born on the 7th of January, 1995 in Kaani-Bori, Khana, Rivers State, Nigeria. He attended Community Secondary School Kaani and obtained WASC O’ level before proceeding to the University of Port Harcourt, graduating with B.Sc. (Hons) Computer Science.

== Activism ==
Monday began his environmental engagement as a young volunteer in 2012, around the period when environmental and community-rights organizations in Rivers State, including the Ogoni Solidarity Forum and Social Action, were campaigning against forced evictions, land acquisition and environmental degradation affecting communities in the Niger Delta.

His early environmental interests developed into work in environmental education, sustainability and climate action. He subsequently participated in environmental training such as School of Ecology organized by the Health of Mother Earth Foundation (HOMEF) and completed climate science course through the Ghana Climate Literacy Portal.

In 2019, he was awarded Diana Award for his work.

He later became the Nigeria Ambassador of Tunza Eco-Generation where he wrote monthly reports on the environment. Monday won the 12th Tunza Eco-Generation International Essay Contest at the Honourable Mention category under the theme “Air Pollution”.

== Advocacy ==
Monday is the executive director of Greenshield Foundation for Ecosystem Restoration and Wildlife Conservation, a Nigeria nonprofit organization established in 2025. Through the foundation, he has independently monitored the Ogoni Cleanup, called on the Federal Ministry of Environment in Nigeria to release remediation data to the community and led community protest against HYPREP and the Federal Government demanding accountability and transparency in Ogoni cleanup.

== Publication ==
Monday is also an entrepreneur and business development expert whose work focuses on helping small scale entrepreneurs grow. In December 2025, he published “Entrepreneurship Education and Youth Empowerment in Africa” in the UKR Journal of Economics, Business and Management (Volume 1, Issue 10), alongside Nnordee Bariagara King David and Dr. Felix Ifeanyi Nwala.
