= Nenibarini Zabbey =

Nigerian environmental scientist

- Born: Nenibarini Zabbey
- Known for: Hydrobiology
- Scientific career
- Fields: Environmental Science
- Institutions: University of Port Harcourt

Nenibarini Zabbey is a Nigerian environmental scientist and Professor of Biomonitoring and Restoration Ecology. In 2024, he was appointed by President Bola Tinubu as the Project Coordinator of Hydrocarbon Pollution Remediation Project (HYPREP), the agency responsible for the implementation of UNEP Environmental Assessment report and cleanup of oil polluted sites in Ogoniland and Niger Delta region of Nigeria. and was a senior lecturer at the Department of Fisheries Faculty of Agriculture, University of Port Harcourt.
