= Beverly Hills Police Department =

Police department in Beverly Hills, California

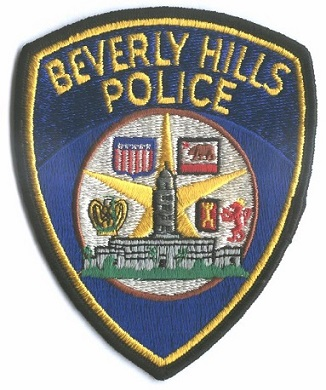
- Patch of the Beverly Hills Police Department

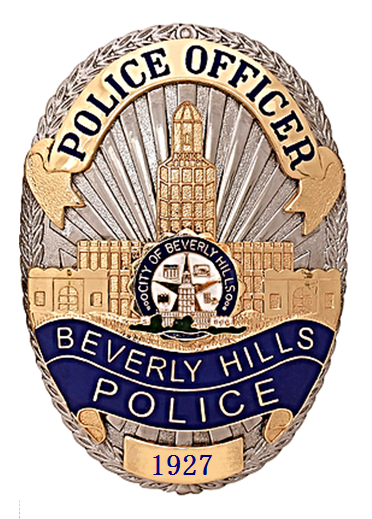
- Badge of the Beverly Hills Police Department
- Abbreviation: BHPD

Agency overview
- Formed: 1927
- Employees: 145 Sworn Positions. 95 Non-Sworn Positions (Full-Time).

Jurisdictional structure
- Operations jurisdiction: Beverly Hills, California, United States
- General nature: Local civilian police

Operational structure
- Headquarters: 464 N Rexford Dr, Beverly Hills, California 90210

Facilities
- Stations: 1

Website
- beverlyhills.org/departments/policedepartment/

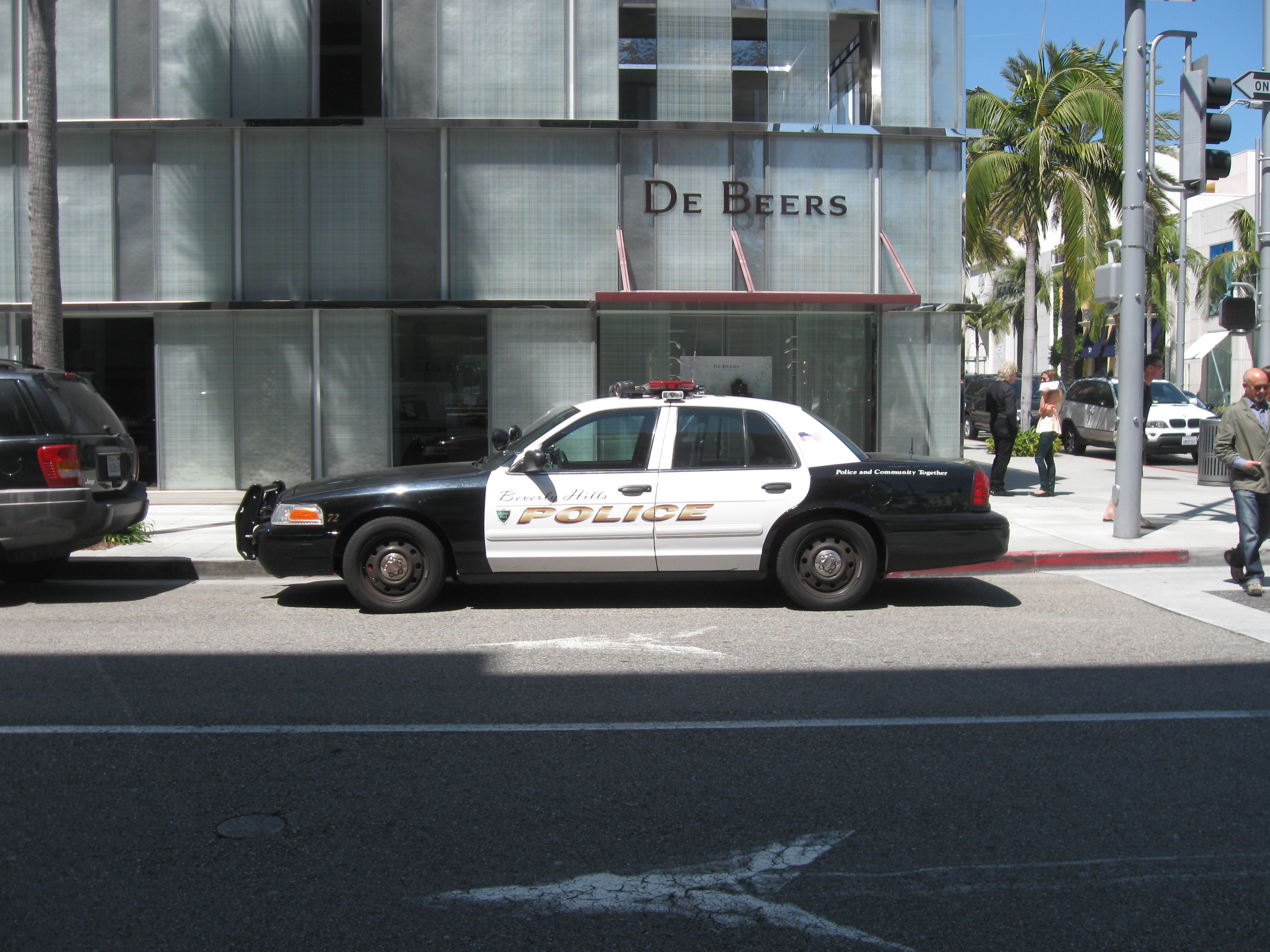
Beverly Hills Police Department car.

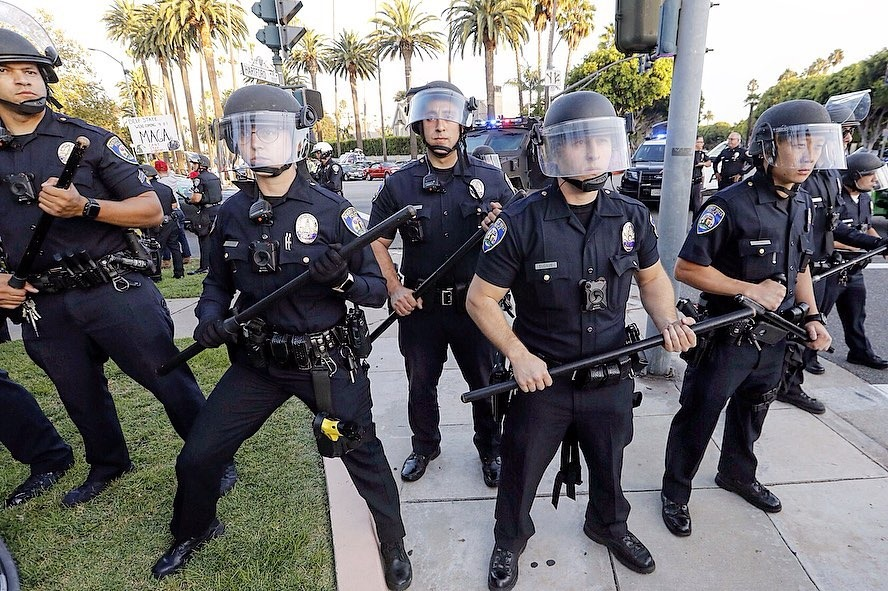
Beverly Hills Police Department officers in light riot gear.

The Beverly Hills Police Department (BHPD) is the police department of the City of Beverly Hills, California.

== History ==
The first law enforcement agency was formed shortly after the City of Beverly Hills was incorporated in 1914. The first city marshal was Augustus Niestrum with a deputy named Jack Munson whose home also served as the headquarters for both the city's Fire and Police Departments. A year later the department was expanded with addition of another officer.

Two further officers joined in 1916. When Deputy Munson retired in 1919, the new City Marshal served as both Fire and Police Chief. After eight years in combined quarters, the Fire and Police Departments were separated in 1925.

On August 1, 1927, the Beverly Hills Police Department became a municipal organization. Blair was reelected becoming its first Chief of Police. Blair was in charge of one captain, three lieutenants, four sergeants, four motor officers, twenty-three patrolmen and three clerks.

The Beverly Hills Police Department moved to the city Hall in 1932. This remained its headquarters until 1990 when it moved to a new purpose-built police facility on Rexford Drive, Beverly Hills.

== Police Chiefs ==
- Charles Blair (1927–1942) (First chief)
- Clinton H. Anderson (1942–1969)
- Joseph Paul Kimble (1969–1971)
- Brice L. Cork (1971–1975)
- Edward S. Kreins (1975–1979)
- Lee D. Tracy (1979–1985)
- Marvin P. Iannone (1985–2003)
- David L. Snowden (2004–2015)
- Acting Police Chief Dominick Rivetti (2015–2016), (2020–2021)
- Sandra Spagnoli (2016–2020)
- Mark Stainbrook (2021–2026)
- Max Subin (2026–)

== Media ==
The Beverly Hills Police Department has been featured in several films including the Beverly Hills Cop series and the 1986 comedy movie Down and Out in Beverly Hills.

== See also ==
- Law enforcement in Los Angeles County
