= Richard Marvin =

Richard Marvin may refer to:

- Richard P. Marvin (1803–1892), American lawyer and politician from New York
- Richard Marvin (composer), American film composer

== See also ==
- Richard Marven, American naval officer and whistleblower
- Ricky Marvin (born 1980), Mexican second-generation professional wrestler
