= Marvin Dekil =

Marvin Barinemnwin Dekil
- Born: Marvin Barinemnwin Dekil; 13 October 1969 (age 56); Gokana, Rivers, Nigeria
- Education: University of Leeds; University of Oxford; University of Bradford; Birkbeck University of London; University of Port Harcourt
- Known for: Environmental Scientist. Legal Practitioner, Leadership and Management Consultant
- Spouse: Augusta O. Dekil
- Awards: Fellow, Institute of Management Consultants, Member, Chartered Institution of Wastes Management, UK
- Scientific career
- Fields: Environmental Science
- Workplaces: United Nations Environment Program

Marvin Dekil, is a Nigerian environmental scientist, lawyer, businessman and politician. In 2017, President Mohammadu Buhari appointment Dr. Dekil Founding Project Coordinator of Hydrocarbon Pollution Remediation Project (HYPREP) at the Federal Ministry of Environment, the agency responsible for the implementation of UNEP Environmental Assessment of report and cleanup of oil polluted sites in Ogoniland and Niger Delta region of Nigeria.

He was Technical Lead, UNEP Environmental Assessment of Ogoniland Project and a Technical Adviser to Rivers State Commissioner for the Environment. He is the Managing Director and Chief Executive Officer of Dexcom Solution Ltd, and Principal Partner at the law firm M.B. Dekil & Co.

== Early life and education ==
Marvin Dekil was born in 1969 in Ogoni, Rivers state, Nigeria. He attended Akpor Grammar School, Ozuoba Port Harcourt and obtained WASC O’ level before proceeding to the University of Port Harcourt, graduating with B. Sc. (Hons) Microbiology. Dr. Dekil obtained an MSc in Environmental Pollution Control from the Department of Fuel and Energy, University of Leeds and a PhD in Environmental Science from the University of Bradford in the United Kingdom. He attended Oxford Leading Strategic Projects Programme and Oxford Executive Leadership Programme, Said Business School University of Oxford.

Dekil is also a Lawyer and holds a BL from the Nigerian Law School and a Qualifying Law Degree, LLM from the Birkbeck College University of London. He is an alumnus of Kellog College University of Oxford.

== Career ==
Dekil was a World Wide Fund International Prince Bernhard Scholar at the University of Leeds United Kingdom. He has been a consultant to various multinational and international organizations in the United Kingdom and Nigeria, including the United Nations Environment Programme UNEP, IBM Global Services, AstraZeneca, Environment Agency England, International Oil Companies including Shell Nigeria (SPDC), Eni/Agip, and Federal and State governments in Nigeria. He was member of Nigeria delegation to United Nations Climate Change Conference in Katowice Poland, Madrid Spain and Earth Summit Rio +20, Rio de Janeiro, Brazil. He is a Fellow of the Nigeria Institute of Management Consultants.

Dekil who is an expert in contaminated land remediation was appointed by Nigerian President Muhammadu Buhari Founding Project Coordinator HYPREP, to lead the first ever Government of Nigeria oil pollution clean up programme, Hydrocarbon Pollution Remediation Project (HYPREP) and implement recommendations of the United Nations Environment Programme UNEP report on Ogoniland.

Dekil is Managing Director/CEO of Dexcom Solution Ltd and Managing Partner at M.B.Dekil & Co. Perfection Chambers Law firm and was previously Associate Attorney at Afe Babalola SAN Emmanuel Chambers Law office Port Harcourt.

== Awards and fellowships ==
- World Wildlife Fund (International) Postgraduate Scholar (Prince Bernhard Scholarship for Nature Conservation), University of Leeds
- Fellow, Nigeria Institute of Management Consultants
- UNEP Certificate in Environmental Assessment
- Member, Chartered Institution of Wastes Management, UK
- Member, Nigeria Environmental Society
