= Marvin Oliver =

Marvin Oliver may refer to:

- Marvin Oliver (artist) (1946–2019)
- Marvin Oliver (footballer) (born 1975)
