= Marvin Vogel =

Zimbabwean cricketer (born 1985)

Personal information
- Full name: Marvin John Vogel
- Born: 29 December 1985 (age 40); Mutare, Manicaland, Zimbabwe
- Batting: Right-handed
- Bowling: Right-arm leg break

Domestic team information
- Years: Team
- 2003/04–2005/06: Manicaland

Career statistics
Competition	FC	LA
Matches	1	1
Runs scored	0	22
Batting average	–	22.00
100s/50s	0/0	0/0
Top score	0*	22
Balls bowled	24	–
Wickets	0	–
Bowling average	–	–
5 wickets in innings	–	–
10 wickets in match	–	–
Best bowling	–	–
Catches/stumpings	1/–	0/–
- Source: ESPNcricinfo, 17 July 2021

Marvin John Vogel (born 29 December 1985) is a former Zimbabwean cricketer. A right-handed batsman and right-arm leg break bowler, he played one first-class match for Manicaland during the 2003–04 Logan Cup, with his side losing to Matabeleland.
