= Matthew Marvin =

Matthew Marvin may refer to:

- Matthew Marvin, Sr. (1600–1678), founding settler of Norwalk, Connecticut and deputy of the General Court of the Colony of Connecticut
- Matthew Marvin, Jr. (1626–1712), founding settler of Norwalk, Connecticut and deputy of the Connecticut General Assembly
- Matthew Marvin (Connecticut politician), member of the Connecticut House of Representatives from 1796 to 1799
