= Tamar Yonah =

Israeli radio personality

Tamar Yonah (Hebrew: תמר יונה; born 1961 in Orange County, California) is an Israeli radio personality. She immigrated to Israel in 1978.

== Radio broadcasting career ==
In 2000 she joined Israel National Radio AKA Arutz Sheva as a show host and news broadcaster and later became program manager. Arutz Sheva broadcast without a license off the shores of Tel Aviv and was shut down. Yonah then joined Voice of Israel. When Voice of Israel shut down, she launched Israel News Talk Radio - INTR.

== Israel News Talk Radio ==
Israel News Talk Radio is a web based streaming radio providing talk radio in English. Some shows are streamed live and all or archived and podcasts via SoundCloud and iTunes.
