= Marvin Levy =

Marvin Levy may refer to:

- Marvin David Levy (1932–2015), American composer
- Marvin Levy (publicist) (1928–2025), American publicist
