= John Marvin =

John Marvin may refer to:

- John Marvin (sailor) (1927–1980), American sailor
- John Marvin (politician) (1678–1776), member of the House of Representatives of the Colony of Connecticut
- John Marvin (boxer), English-Filipino boxer
- John Gage Marvin (1815–1855), American lawyer
- Johnny Marvin (1897–1944), musician

== See also ==
- John Marvyn (died 1566), MP
