= Marvin Ammori =

American activist and lawyer

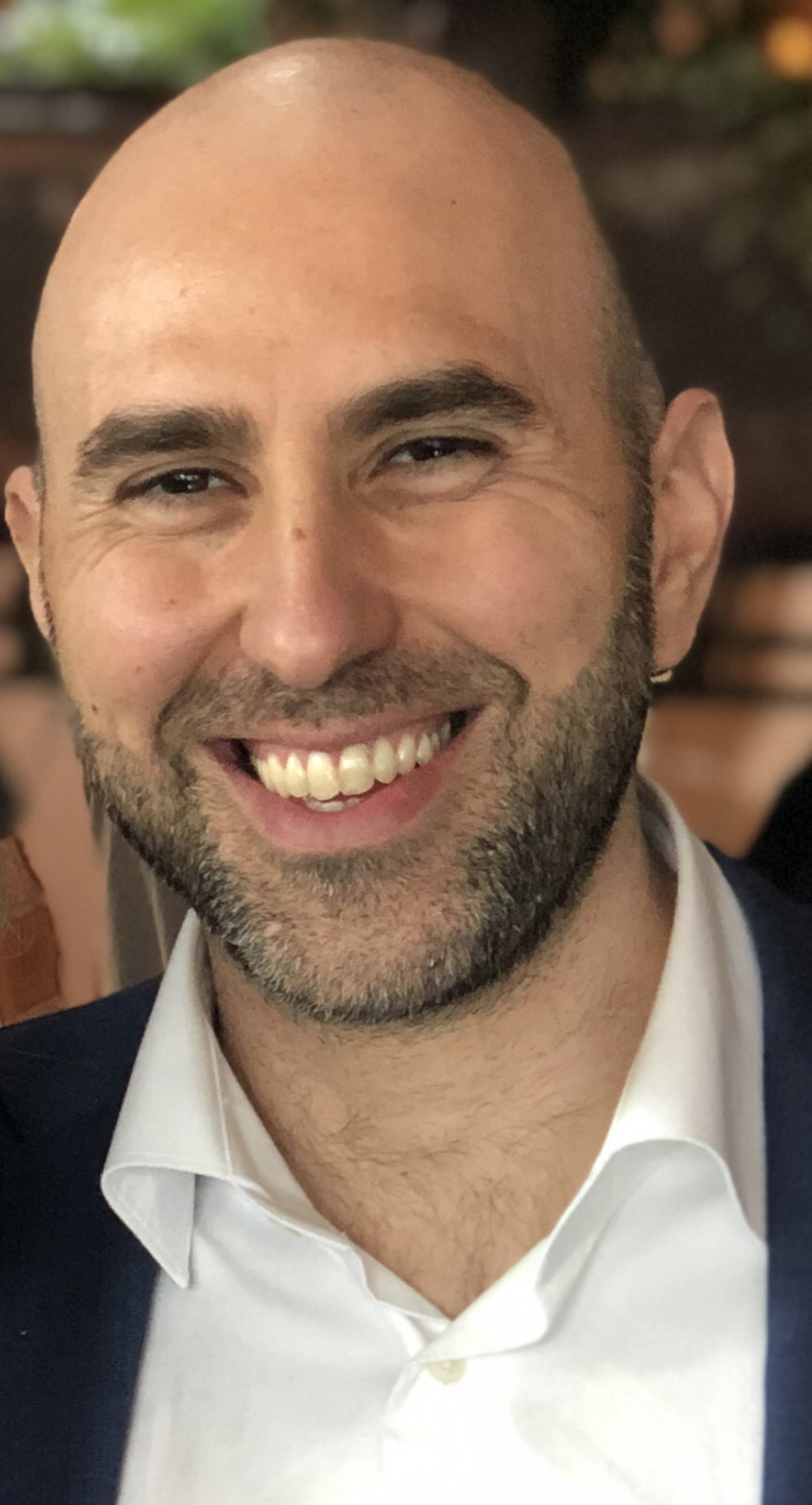
- Pictured in 2019
- Born: Southfield, Michigan, U.S.
- Education: University of Michigan (BA); Harvard Law School (JD)
- Known for: Legal and technology expert

Marvin Ammori is an American lawyer, civil liberties advocate, and scholar best known for his work on network neutrality and Internet freedom issues. He is Chief Legal Officer of Uniswap.

== Career ==
Ammori attended Brother Rice High School and studied literature at the University of Michigan. He earned a Juris Doctor from Harvard Law School., where he studied under communications scholar Yochai Benkler.

In 2007, while general counsel for nonprofit advocacy group Free Press, Ammori wrote the original Comcast complaint to the FCC in the Comcast-BitTorrent case, the first network neutrality enforcement action in the United States.

From 2008 to 2011, Ammori taught law at the University of Nebraska-Lincoln-College of Law, where he helped launch the law school's program in space and telecommunications law.

In 2013, Ammori was named a Bernard L. Schwartz Fellow at the New America Foundation. In 2015, he was named a Senior Fellow to the Democracy Fund.

In 2014 and 2015, he worked on an effort to urge the Federal Communications Commission to adopt strong network neutrality rules on the basis of its Title II authority. Ammori collaborated with Last Week Tonight with John Oliver for a network neutrality segment and worked with White House staff leading to President Obama's network neutrality plan.

On June 14, 2016, the D.C. Circuit Court, which had in 2014 rejected the FCC's attempts to impose network neutrality rules under its 706 authority, upheld the Title II network neutrality rules, writing in the majority opinion that the FCC had overcome the problems of the previous rules "by reclassifying broadband service—and the interconnection arrangements necessary to provide it—as a telecommunications service" under Title II, thereby vindicating Ammori's legal approach.

From 2016 to 2018, Ammori served as general counsel of Virgin Hyperloop One.

In 2018, Ammori joined Protocol Labs.

Ammori was an advisor on season six for HBO's Emmy award-winning show Silicon Valley. He is the author "On Internet Freedom."
