= Marvin Ramirez =

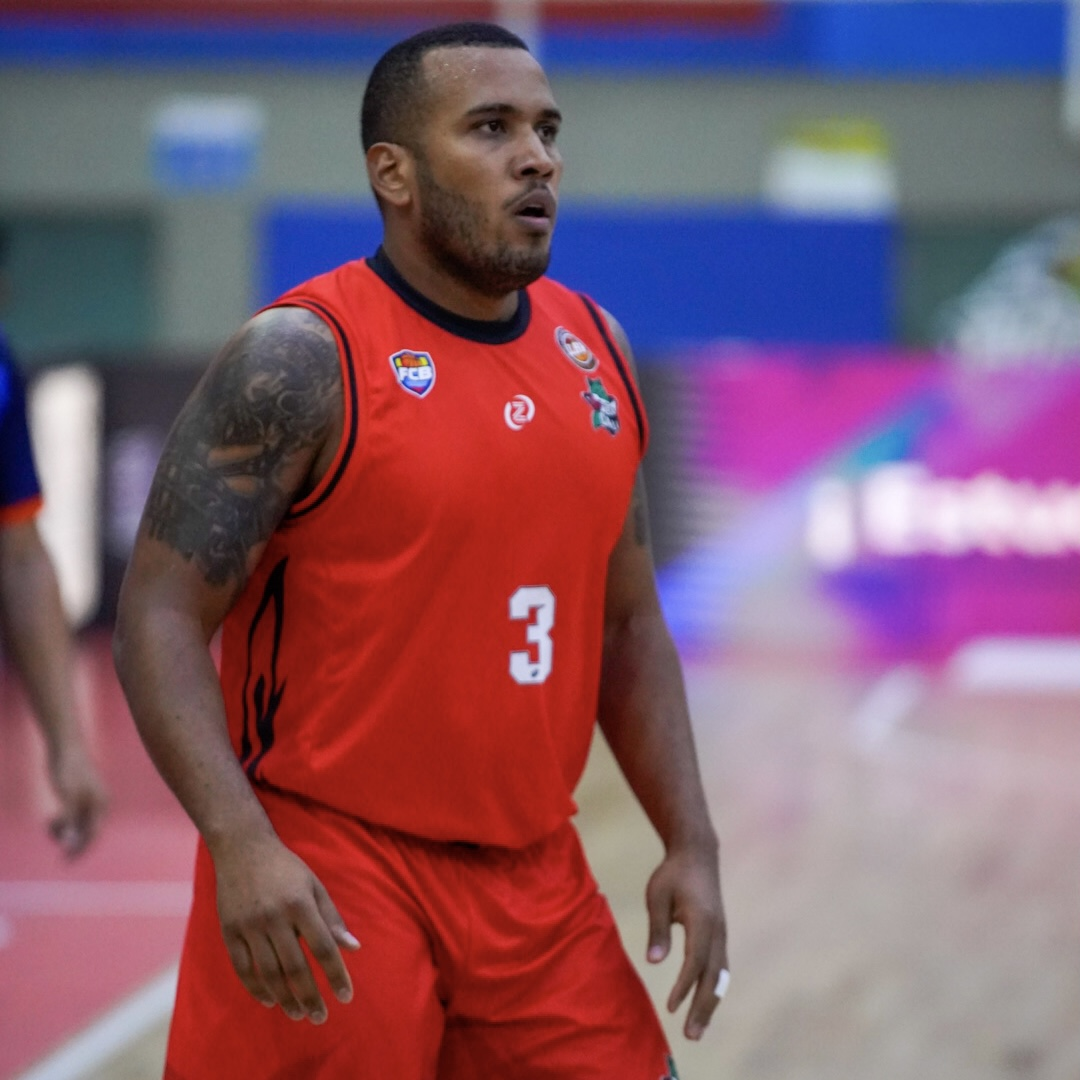
- Marvin Ramirez Team Cali

No. 3 – Team Cali
- Position: Point guard
- League: Baloncesto Profesional Colombiano

Personal information
- Born: 20 May 1989 (age 37) New York, New York
- Listed height: 6 ft 2 in (1.88 m)
- Listed weight: 220 lb (100 kg)

Career information
- High school: James Monroe High School
- College: SUNY Sullivan
- Playing career: 2010–present

Career history
- 2010: Indervalle
- 2011: Fastbreak
- 2012: Cafeteros de Armenia
- 2013: Cañeros del Este
- 2014: Once Caldas
- 2015: Club Deportes Puente Alto
- 2016: Bronx Holly Flames
- 2017: C.S. Emelec
- 2018-2019: Philadelphia Cannons
- 2021: Team Cali-present

Marvin Bryant Ramirez (born 20 May 1989) is a Colombian professional basketball player for Team Cali. of the Division Profesional de Baloncesto Colombiano (DPB).

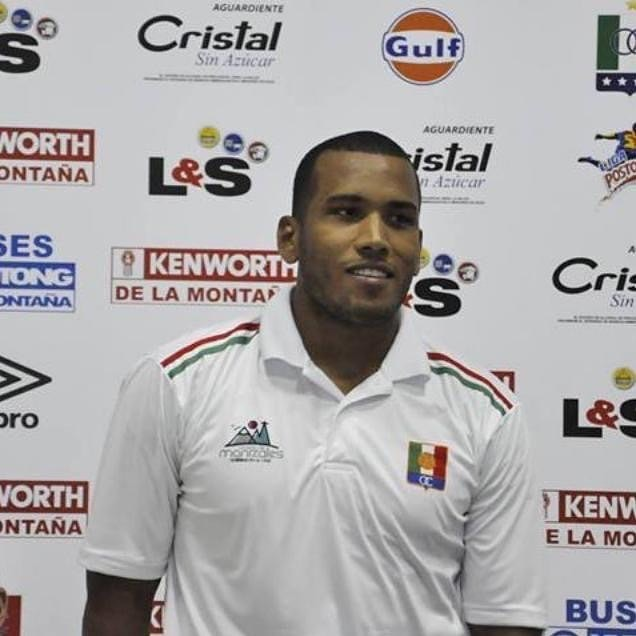
Ramirez with Once Caldas de Manizales

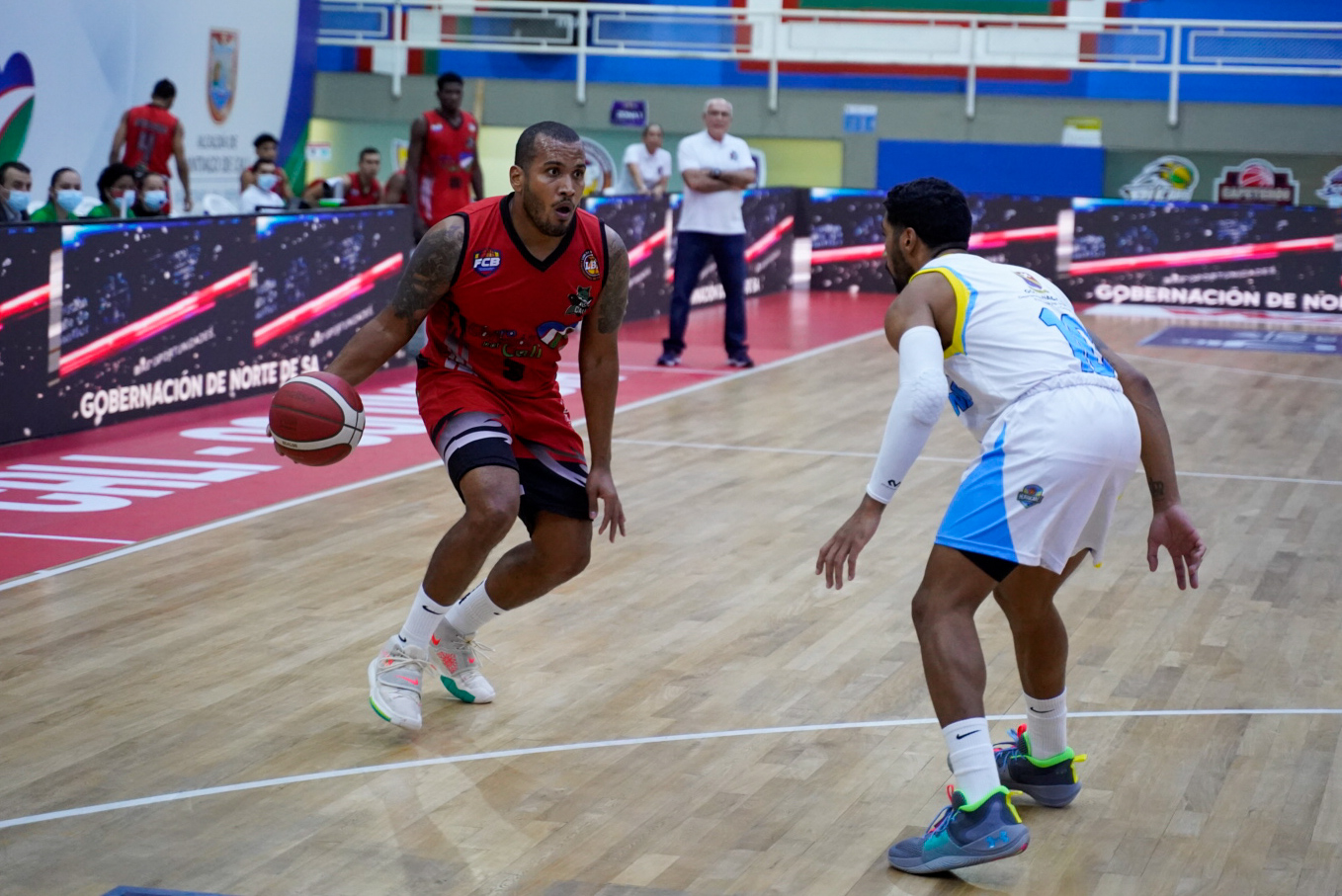
Ramirez with Team Cali

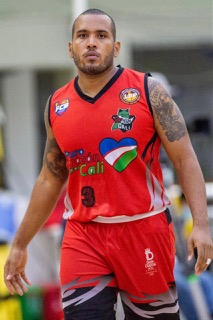
Ramirez 2021

Ramirez played for InderValle his rookie year in the Liga Baloncesto Profesional Colombiano. Ramirez also played basketball for the Cafeteros de Armenia, and Once Caldas de Manizales. Since 2015 Ramirez has played in the mid-Atlantic conference of the East Coast Basketball League (ECBL).

== Amateur career ==
Ramirez played basketball in high school at James Monroe High School in Bronx, New York, and in college two season at SUNY Sullivan, 2007–09 season, New York NJCAA.

== Professional career ==
On 1 May 2010, he signed Colombia at InderValle de Cali, Colombia for the Copa Federacion.

On 20 January 2011 he stays In Colombia and signs with Fast Break de Cali, Colombia.

On 4 August 2012 he agreed to a deal with Cafeteros de Armenia, Colombia.

On 25 April 2013 he signs with Canerors Del Este, for the Liga Nacional de Baloncesto Profesional Dominican Republic.

On 18 July 2014 Signs with Once Caldas de Manizales, Colombia.

On 1 April 2021 Signs with Team Cali, Colombia.
