= Marvin Weiss =

German footballer (born 1995)

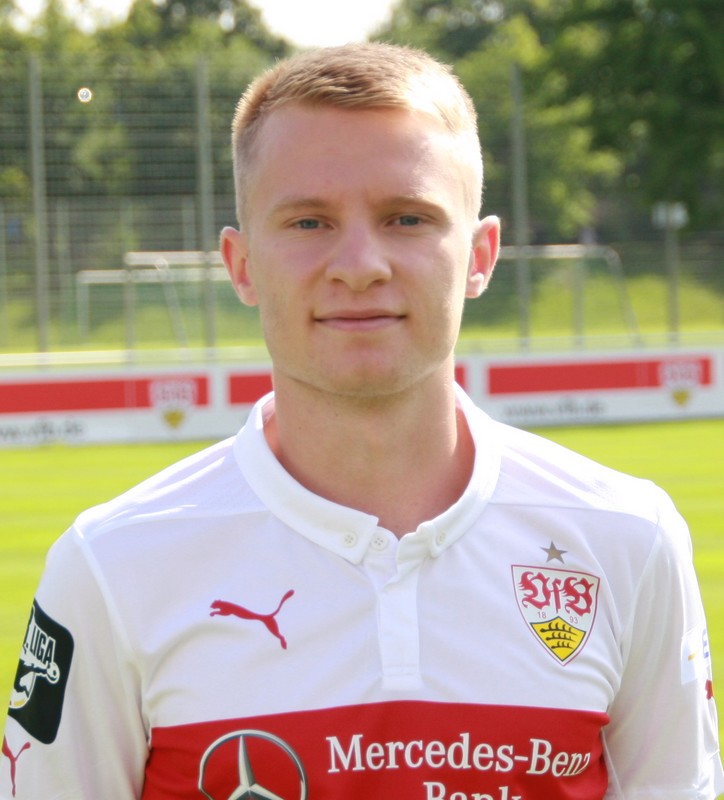
- Weiss in 2014

Personal information
- Date of birth: 7 March 1995 (age 31)
- Place of birth: Stuttgart, Germany
- Height: 1.72 m (5 ft 8 in)
- Position: Midfielder

Youth career
- 2000–2014: VfB Stuttgart

Senior career*
Years	Team	Apps	(Gls)
2014–2015	VfB Stuttgart II	3	(0)
2015–2017	SC Freiburg II	26	(1)
2017–2019	FV Illertissen	35	(1)
2019–2021	Stuttgarter Kickers	13	(2)

International career
2010	Germany U16	2	(0)
2011	Germany U17	2	(1)
- * Club domestic league appearances and goals as of 14:21, 16 October 2022 (UTC)

Marvin Weiss (born 7 March 1995) is a German footballer who plays as a midfielder.

== Career ==
Weiss made his professional debut for VfB Stuttgart II in the 3. Liga on 21 February 2015, coming on as a substitute in the 89th minute for Sercan Sararer in the 4–1 home win against Sonnenhof Großaspach.
