= Marvin Smith (disambiguation) =

Marvin Smith (born 1961) is an American jazz drummer and composer.

Marvin Smith may also refer to:

- Marvin "Bugalu" Smith (born 1948), American jazz musician
- Marvin Eugene Smith (born 1952), American songwriter and music executive
- Marvin H. Smith (1916–2010), American judge
- Marvin Smith (photographer) (1910–2003), documented Harlem in 1930s–1950s
- Marv Smith (1898–1986), American pro football player, Canton Bulldogs, 1920s
- Marvin W. Smith (1901–1982), American politician from Iowa
- W. Marvin Smith (died 1948), American attorney in U.S. Department of Justice
- Marvin "Sweet Louie" Smith (died 2007), member of R&B group Checkmates, Ltd.
