= Senator Marvin =

Senator Marvin may refer to:

- Charles Marvin (Connecticut politician) (1804–1883), Connecticut State Senate
- Nathaniel C. Marvin (1826–1895), New York State Senate
