= Marvin Allen =

Marvin Allen may refer to:

- Marvin Allen (wide receiver) (born 1983), American football wide receiver for the London Warriors
- Marvin Allen (running back) (born 1965), retired American football player for the New England Patriots
- Marvin Allen (soccer) (1915–1996), collegiate head soccer coach
