= Marvin Harvey =

Marvin Harvey may refer to:

- Marvin Harvey (American football) (born 1959), American football player
- Marvin Harvey (basketball) (born 1954), American basketball player
- Marvin Harvey (pole vaulter) (born 1908), American pole vaulter, runner-up at the 1931 USA Outdoor Track and Field Championships
