= James Marvin =

James Marvin may refer to:

- James M. Marvin (1809–1901), U.S. Representative from New York
- James Marvin (academic) (1820–1901), chancellor of the University of Kansas

== See also ==
- James Marvyn (1529–1611), English MP
