= Marvin Simon =

Marvin Kenneth Simon (September 10, 1939 – September 23, 2007) was a telecommunication engineer who worked extensively for 35 years in the area of modulation, coding, and synchronization for space, satellite, radio, and military communications and also performance evaluation of wireless telecommunication systems over fading channels. Simon got his PhD from New York University in 1966, and worked at the Jet Propulsion Laboratory for the subsequent four decades of his life. The fruits of his research have been successfully applied to the design of many of NASA's deep space and near-earth missions for which he has been earned 11 patents, 25 NASA Tech Briefs, 4 Space Act awards, and over 200 technical papers. He died of brain cancer in September 2007.

He was a Fellow of the IEEE, Fellow of the Iowa Academy of Education (IAE), and winner of the NASA Exceptional Service Medal and the NASA Exceptional Engineering Achievement Medal both in recognition of outstanding contributions in analysis and design of space communications systems. In addition, he is listed in Marquis Who's Who in America and other similar compilations.

In 1997 he was the recipient of the IEEE Edwin H. Armstrong Achievement Award for seminal contributions spanning three decades in the design and analysis of novel coherent digital communication systems, including synchronization and tracking, differential modulation and signal design, spread spectrum techniques, and trellis-coded modulation for fading channels. Most recently he was awarded the IEEE Third Millennium Medal for outstanding contributions to communications technology.

He was also the co-recipient of the 1986 Prize Paper Award in Communications of the IEEE Transactions on Vehicular Technology for his work on trellis coded differential detection systems and the 1999 Prize Paper Award of the Vehicular Technology Conference for his work on generalized selection combining performance evaluation over fading channels.

His paper on multiple-symbol differential detection of M-PSK was included in the IEEE Communications Society's 50th Anniversary Journal Collection – as one of the 50 key papers published in the IEEE Transactions on Communications and the IEEE Journal on Selected Areas in Communications, over the past 50 years.

== Books ==
- Probability Distributions Involving Gaussian Random Variables: A Handbook for Engineers and Scientists, Kluwer Academic Publishers, 2002.
- Telecommunication Systems Engineering, Prentice-Hall, 1973 and Dover Press, 1991.
- Phase-Locked Loops and Their Application, IEEE Press, 1978. * Spread Spectrum Communications, Vols. I, II, and III, Computer Science Press, 1984 and McGraw-Hill, 1994.
- An Introduction to Trellis Coded Modulation with Applications, Macmillan, 1991.
- Digital Communication Techniques, Prentice-Hall, 1994.
- Digital Communication over Fading Channels: A Unified Approach to Performance Analysis, John Wiley & Sons, Inc., 2nd ed., November 2004.
- Bandwidth Efficient Digital Modulation with Application to Deep Space Communications, John Wiley and Sons, Inc., 2003.
