= Charles Marvin =

Charles Marvin may refer to:

- Charles Marvin (coach) (1929–2026), American football and baseball coach
- Charles Marvin (Connecticut politician) (1804–1883), American politician in Connecticut
- Charles F. Marvin (1858–1943), American meteorologist
- Charles Thomas Marvin (1854–1890), writer on Russia
