= Marvin P. Iannone =

American law enforcement officer

Marvin D. Iannone was the first assistant chief of police of the Los Angeles Police Department and later the Chief of the Beverly Hills Police Department from 1985 to 2003. He was most famous for being in charge of the security at the 1984 Los Angeles Olympics. He was one of the first police officers to arrive at the death scene of Marilyn Monroe on August 5, 1962, and he has consistently refused to discuss his observations. While there is no factual basis, he has been accused by conspiracy theorists of helping with the cover up of Marilyn Monroe's "murder".
