= Marvin Hayes (painter) =

American artist

- Born: September 30, 1939 (age 86); Canton, Mississippi
- Known for: Painting, Drawing, Printmaking

Marvin Everett Hayes is an American painter and illustrator, working primarily in egg tempera and copperplate etchings.

== Early life and education ==
Hayes was born on September 30, 1939, in Canton, Mississippi. Before he was two, his family moved to Orange, Texas, where his father, Aubrey, was stationed with the Navy during World War II. Shortly after the war, he moved to Hamshire, Texas, with his parents and older brother. His mother, Myrtle, was a nurse.
Hayes’ artistic talent was discovered and encouraged by Juanita Martin of Saratoga, his high school English teacher, and Mr. Bennett, an accountant for the rice dryer in Hamshire, and a wonderful painter who taught Hayes how to paint and took him to the Beaumont Art League for drawing classes. In 1958, Hayes graduated Hamshire-Fannett High School in Hamshire, Texas.
Hayes was athletic. In 1958, he was recruited by legendary coach Bear Bryant and received a football scholarship to Texas A&M University. After only one season, he returned home to care for his sick mother and help his older brother through school. Hayes stayed out of school for a semester, then received an academic scholarship to Lamar University in 1960-63 and a job offer from Lamb Printing. In 1963, Hayes graduated Lamar University Magna Cum Laude, was Phi Beta Kappa, and national student editor of "Kappa Phi Magazine" (the honor fraternity for art students). From Lamar he went on scholarship to Columbia University in New York, where he was Meyer Schapiro’s assistant for three years.

== Artistic career ==
Following graduation, Hayes became an award-winning illustrator, appearing in Esquire, McCall's, Playboy, Redbook, Reader's Digest, Time, and Good Housekeeping. Encouraged by Ted Rousseau and Meyer Schapiro, he turned to fine art, working primarily in egg tempera and copperplate etchings.

Hayes won First Award in 1972 in the 22nd Annual New England Painting and Sculpture Exhibition Graphics Exhibition. The same year he had work accepted in the International Graphics Exhibition.

Hayes’ 1977 masterwork, God's Images. The Bible: A New Vision, illustrates the Bible through 53 etchings, with text by poet-novelist James Dickey. The book sold over a hundred thousand copies and was reviewed favorably by The New York Times, The New Yorker, and Book Digest, among others. It won the National Bible Committee Award for books, presented by then-president Jimmy Carter. Hayes appeared on several television shows, including the Today Show and the Dick Cavett Show.

From 1965 to 1991, Hayes lived in Wilton, Connecticut, where he took care of his ailing mother. His mother died in 1988, 15 years after his father's death in an auto accident. When he returned to New York City, he had been honored as a humanitarian in Connecticut and in New York, among others with Wilton's Distinguished Citizen Award and the Partners in Caring Award for Connecticut.

Since June 1963, Marvin Hayes has been affiliated as a volunteer with the Metropolitan Museum of Art in New York City, working in the Education, Drawings and Prints, Media and Objects Conservation Departments. He first used his skill as a typist and knowledge of offset printing, typesetting and book layout to help design many of the books and catalogs at the Metropolitan Museum including the three major catalogs for the Italian Renaissance 15th to 18th Century Drawings catalogs under Jacob Bean. When computers became available, he taught the other workers at the Metropolitan how to use them.

In 1999, Marvin and Antoine Wilmering created a 360⁰ virtual reality picture of the Gubbio Studiolo on a DVD to go with the two volume publication by Antoine Wilmering and Olga Raggio – one volume is about the restoration while the other is about its history. Wilmering now works as wood conservator for the Getty Museum.

Hayes has worked on many shows at the Metropolitan Museum. For several years, he recorded instances when the staff of the Metropolitan were interviewed on television including the Director Philippe de Montebello's Sunday show on PBS and made DVDs for the Watson Library at the Metropolitan. Marvin helped curator Wolfram Koeppe and devised a way to show the furniture of David and Abraham Roentgen which is beautiful wood inlay marquetry with secret compartments, sliding panels, rolltop desks, clocks, thermostats, and in some cases opened like beautiful butterflies. The viewers were able to see actual videos of the pieces being opened and displayed showing all of its secret compartments and sliding panels and mechanical inner workings. A video clip from the 2012 show of the Berlin cabinet went viral on YouTube with over thirteen million hits (Now at 11/22/2016) Use this link: https://www.youtube.com/watch?v=MKikHxKeodA The technique of using monitors to enhance, enlarge, and illustrate objects such as furniture, sculpture, pottery, and jewelry has become a standard since Marvin first suggest it.

Marvin worked on the 2008 Rembrandt Drawings show and for Master Curator Dr. Carmen Bambach he worked over ten years on several shows and made a database for all the Italian and Spanish drawings. He worked on the 2003 blockbuster exhibit of the drawings of Leonardo da Vinci in which he created three illustrations in the catalogue. Marvin also did preliminary imaging work for Dr. Carmen Bambach on the Michelangelo drawings show due in November 2017.

Hayes has given lectures, seminars and workshops at Yale, Harvard and Columbia Universities, the Rhode Island School of Design and Carnegie Institute, as well as the Metropolitan Museum of Art and Lamar University. A member of the Microsoft development team, he was an early proponent and innovator of digital imaging and an expert in video, scanning, color calibration and large format printing. He is on the Microsoft Online Research Panel, evaluating software in Beta, and new computers and hardware. He has written software programs for many years and before Microsoft Word and Word Perfect, he created the word processing programs for the Metropolitan Museum of Art.

Hayes won the top award in the New England Annual Painting and Sculpture Show, The National Print Show, and the Bi-Annual Texas Tri-State Show. In 1983, he received the Distinguished Alumnus Award from Lamar University, and a presidential scholarship was created in his name.
Marvin Hayes lives in New York City with his partner Frank Bara.

== Exhibitions (work in progress) ==
1985 Vatican Museums, Vatican City
1995 Presbyterian Gallery in Stamford, CT
2000 Catherine J. Smith Gallery, Appalachian State University', Boone, NC
Museums exhibiting his work include the Metropolitan, Boston, Smithsonian, National Portrait Gallery, Brooklyn, Bibliothèque Nationale and New York Public Library.

== Collections (work in progress) ==
Vatican Museums, Vatican City
Dishman Art Museum, Lamar University, Beaumont, Texas
Private collectors include Louis Auchincloss, Jacqueline Onassis, David Rockefeller, Barbara Walters and Anwar Sadat.
