= Dinner in the Sky =

Novelty restaurant service

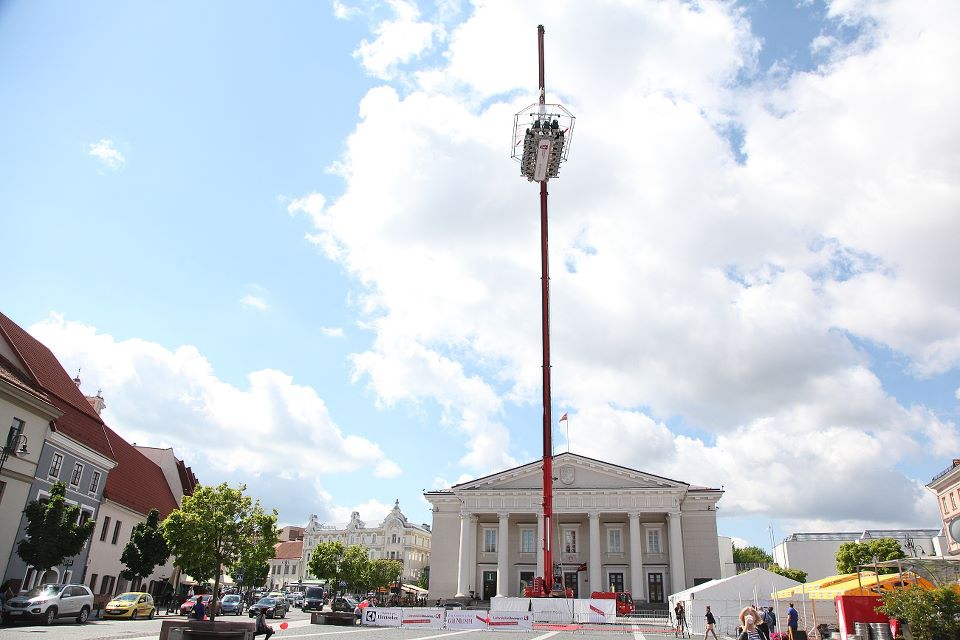
Dinner in the Sky in Vilnius, Lithuania.

Dinner in the Sky is a Belgian-based novelty restaurant service which uses a crane to hoist its diners, table, and waiting staff 150 feet (46 m) into the air. Forbes magazine called it one of the world's ten most unusual restaurants.

Dinner in the Sky has mobile services available in 60 nations; the company has operations in various cities, including Paris and Las Vegas.

== History ==
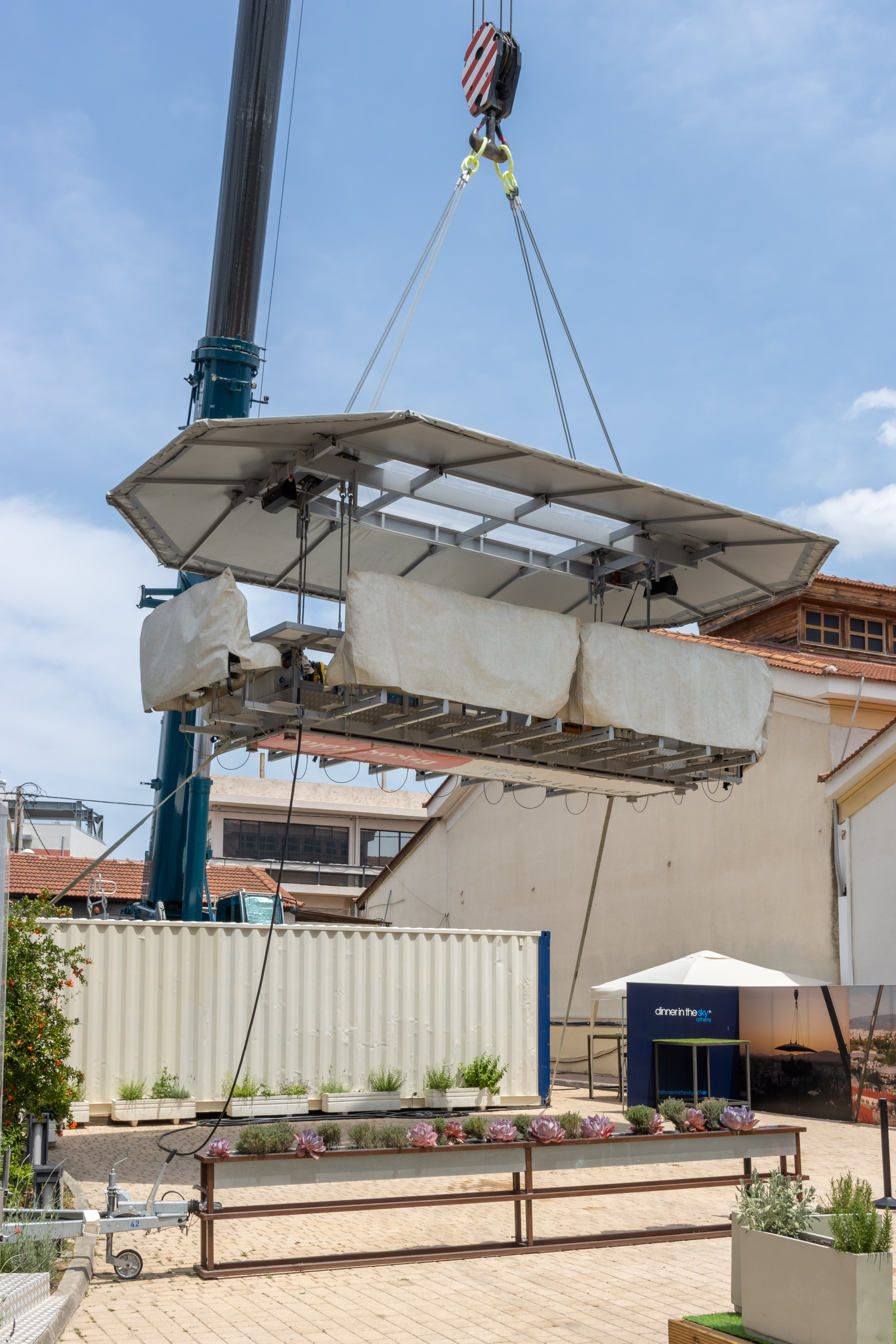
Dinner in the Sky at Technopolis Athens

In 2007, David Ghysels, the owner of a marketing and communications company, partnered with Stefan Kerkhofs, a bungee jumping organizer, to create an aerial-based dinner for the Jeunes Restaurateurs d'Europe association. Shortly afterwards, Ghysels and Kerkhofs began receiving telephone calls from people around the world who wished to replicate their aerial dinner concept; the two men subsequently chose to franchise their idea. Ghysels said, "People were getting bored with just going to the same old restaurants."

In 2008, Las Vegas resident Michael Hinden and his wife Janeen discovered Dinner in the Sky during a trade fair. On 31 December 2008, the Hindens tested the concept in Las Vegas as part of a New Year's Eve party for their friends and business partners. In March 2009, Michael Hinden began operating a Las Vegas-based Dinner in the Sky on West Sahara Avenue during weekends.

By August 2009, Dinner in the Sky operated in more than a dozen countries, including Canada and China. At that time, Hinden planned to move his restaurant to the Las Vegas Strip, at the site of a vacant building previously used as a sales office for the nearby Trump International Hotel. Hinden, who had 15 employees working for his restaurant service, hoped to begin operating six days a week at the new location. However, Steve Wynn, owner of the Wynn and Encore properties across the street, objected to the plan, calling Dinner in the Sky a "carnival-like attraction." Boyd Gaming also opposed the relocation, which would place the restaurant near its Echelon Place project. Hinden's relocation plans were rejected by county officials who noted safety concerns and felt that such a restaurant did not belong on the Las Vegas Strip.

In January 2013, plans were underway for a new, permanent location in Las Vegas, near CityCenter. The new location was to cost $4 million, and would include the conversion of an office into a ground-based restaurant and bar. A groundbreaking ceremony for the Las Vegas location took place in June 2013. The Las Vegas restaurant was the company's first permanent location.
