= Okunlola =

Nigerian given name

- Gender: Male
- Language: Yoruba

Origin
- Origin: Nigeria
- Meaning: Health is wealth.
- Region of origin: South West, Nigeria

Okunlola is a Nigerian male given name and surname of Yoruba origin. It means "Health is wealth".

Notable individuals with the name include:

- Samson Okunlola (born October 12, 2004), American football player
- Samuel Okunlola (born September 27, 2003), American football player
