= Roxbury High School =

Roxbury High School may refer to:

- Roxbury High School (New Jersey), Roxbury Township, New Jersey, United States
- Roxbury Memorial High School (1926–1959), Boston, Massachusetts, United States
- Roxbury High School (1959–1974), Boston, Massachusetts, a target of compulsory busing in the Boston busing crisis
