= Gladys Wood =

American educator and school administrator

- Gladys Wood
- Born: May 16, 1916; Boston, Massachusetts, U.S.
- Died: August 3, 2017 (aged 101); Milton, Massachusetts, U.S.
- Occupations: School principal; teacher

Gladys Sara Wood (May 16, 1916 – August 3, 2017) was an American educator and academic administrator. She was the first African-American principal in the Boston Public Schools.

== Early life and education ==
Gladys Wood was born on May 16, 1916, in the Roxbury neighborhood of Boston, Massachusetts, to Samuel Clarence Wood Sr. and Gertrude Ella Boyd. Her father worked as a porter, carpenter, and lumber surveyor. Her mother was a schoolteacher in Alabama before she married and moved to Massachusetts. Gladys Wood was the third of 13 children. Her middle name was recorded as "Samuel" in early family Bibles, and her baptism recorded it as "Sammie", but Wood eventually used the middle name "Sara".

Wood attended Julia Ward Howe Elementary School, Lewis Jr. High School, and Roxbury Memorial High School. In 1937, she earned a bachelor's degree from the Teachers College of the City of Boston (later the Boston State College). She earned a master's degree in education from the same college in 1951, writing a 141-page master's thesis entitled "Nutrition And Its Relationship To The Noonday Lunch Of The Growing Child".

== Career ==
Wood began teaching junior high school in the Boston Public Schools in 1947. She became a vice principal of the Charles Perkins school in the Back Bay neighborhood of Boston in 1957. In 1963 she became the assistant director of teacher placement for Boston Public Schools.

In July 1966, Wood was appointed to be Boston's first Black principal, at the Dearborn Elementary school district in Roxbury. The Dearborn district included the Dearborn, Palmer, and Davis schools, and at the time served a population of approximately 1,500 students. Shortly after a press conference in which her appointment was announced, Wood told the Bay State Banner: "I resented the fact that I was singled out as an oddity. In fact, one reporter suggested that he would be watching the Dearborn district very closely. I think it would be unfair for anyone to hold out a separate standard of efficiency for me." She also described her concerns with the school system, including high teacher turnover, which she attributed to teachers who were "unable to cope with what they meet" in the Black school district due to lack of training in teachers colleges. The Roxbury, Hyde Park, and Mattapan neighborhoods in Boston have large populations of Black residents, as well as those from other racial minorities. Particularly during the decades in which Wood taught and served as principals in these communities, the school systems were poorly funded and were allocated few resources. Wood was known for her advocacy for increased funding and better teachers.

Two years after becoming principal at Dearborn Elementary, she was offered a principal position at a junior high school, but chose to stay at Dearborn because she felt there were too many problems yet to fix. Wood later served as principal at the Tileston School in Mattapan and the Chittick School in Hyde Park.

In 1966, Wood was awarded for her "outstanding service to the ideals of brotherhood" by the National Conference of Christians and Jews. In 1968, she received a Frederick A. Douglass Achievement Award.

== Personal life ==
Wood lived in Dorchester, Milton, and Quincy, and for many years lived with two of her sisters. She never married.
