= Marvin J. Udy =

American scientist, inventor and metallurgist

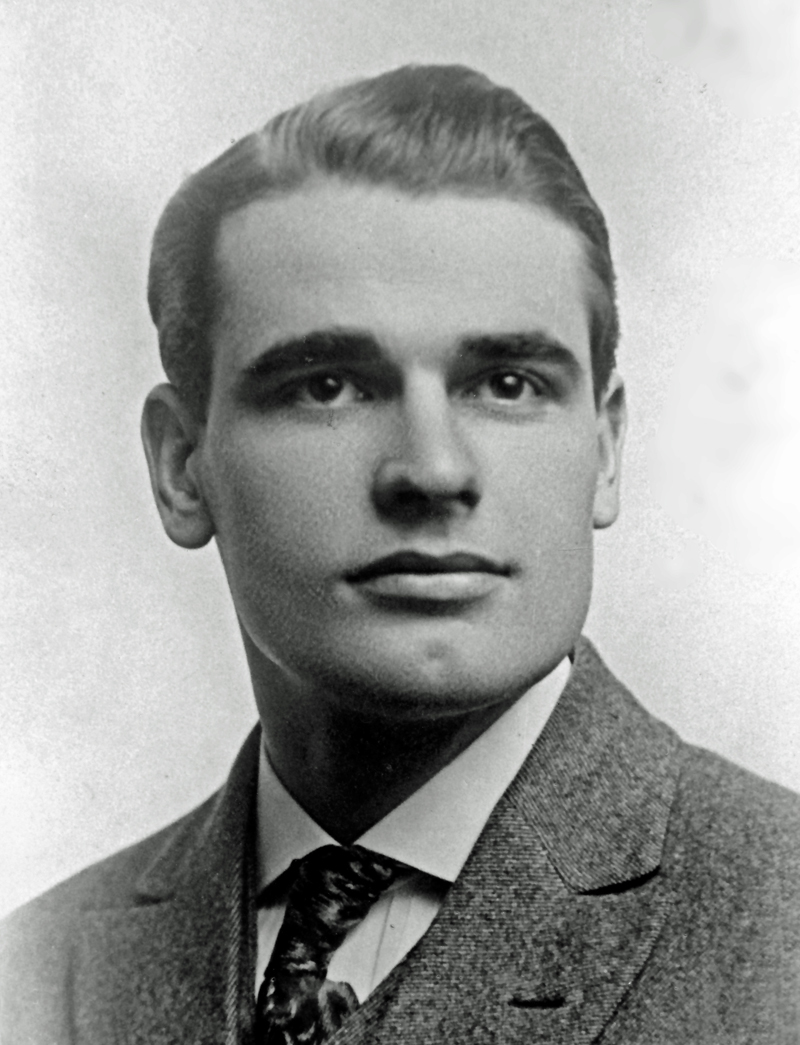
- Marvin J. Udy circa 1915
- Born: 19 February 1892; Farmington, Utah
- Died: 11 April 1959 (aged 67); Niagara Falls, New York
- Resting place: Acacia Park Cemetery, North Tonawanda, New York
- Education: University of Utah
- Spouse: Tessa McMurray (m. 1915)
- Children: 3
- Engineering career
- Discipline: Chemical engineering Metallurgy
- Institutions: United States Smelting, Mining and Refining Company Hooker Electrochemical Company; Haynes Stellite Company; Udylite Process Company; Electro Metallurgical Company; Swann Chemical Company; Oldbury Electrochemical Company; Strategic-Udy Processes, Inc. Strategic-Udy Metallurgical and Chemical Processes, Ltd.
- Projects: Udylite Process; Strategic-Udy Process
- Awards: Schoellkopf Medal (1948)

Marvin J. Udy (/ˈjuːdi/; 19 February 1892 – 11 April 1959) was an American scientist, inventor, chemical engineer, metallurgist, and entrepreneur who is best known for his development of the Udylite process for cadmium plating as well as processes to refine chromium, nickel, cobalt and bismuth.

In 1919, Udy founded the Udylite Process Company in Kokomo, Indiana. Udy invented a process that made steel and iron withstand rust longer than other metals. Many manufacturers adopted Udylite's plating processes.

While at Strategic Materials Corp., Udy invented the Strategic-Udy Process to convert many grades and types of iron ores into semi-refined steel. Strategic Materials Corp. subsequently formed two new companies, Strategic-Udy Metallurgical and Chemical Processes, Ltd., in Niagara Falls, Ontario, and the Strategic-Udy Processes, Inc., in Niagara Falls, New York to further the research and development of Udy's ideas.

In 1948, Mr. Udy was awarded the Jacob F. Schoellkopf Medal from the American Chemical Society in recognition of his invention of the first commercial processes for cadmium plating and for his contributions to the refining and utilization of chromium metal. His process for treating low-grade chrome ores opened up the possibility for American industry to use domestic ores instead of depending on more expensive, higher-grade ores from foreign sources.

Udy was the author of 16 papers and the editor of Volumes I and II of the book "Chromium." He was awarded over 60 patents for his work.

== Early life ==
Marvin J. Udy was the grandson of John W. Hess, an American pioneer and member of the Mormon Battalion. Born in Farmington, Utah on 19 February 1892 to Mathias Cowley Udy and Emily Rebecca Hess, he was the eighth of nine children.

An avid basketball and baseball player, Udy played baseball in college and in semi-pro circuits. He was a member of Hooker Electrochemical Company's championship baseball team.

On 3 June 1915, he married Tessa McMurray in Ogden, Utah and together they had 3 children: Murray Cowley Udy (1916-1965), Lynn Stuart Udy (1917-1952) and Kay Nelson Udy (1919-1919).

== Education ==
Udy graduated with a Bachelor of Science degree in chemical engineering from the University of Utah in 1915. In 1916, he received a Master of Science degree in metallurgy, also from the University of Utah. In 1956, Alfred University awarded Udy an honorary Doctor of Science degree.

== Career ==
After receiving his Master of Science degree in 1916, Udy accepted a position at the United States Smelting, Mining and Refining Company in Midvale, Utah. While there, he focused his research on cadmium production.

In 1918, Udy accepted a position as a chemist for the Hooker Electrochemical Company in Niagara Falls, New York. While at Hooker, he developed a method of separating nickel and cobalt.

From November 1918 to November 1919, Udy was chief chemist for the Haynes Stellite Company of Kokomo, Indiana. Udy worked on the treatment of cobalt ores from Idaho and on manufacturing processes for stellite. During this period, Udy developed a method of plating piano wire with cadmium.

In 1919, Udy founded the Udylite Process Company in Kokomo, Indiana with Frank C. Nicholson and William A Wissler to explore for and mine metals "of all kinds." Udy perfected his rustproofing process for steel and iron. Auto makers and manufacturers of metal products, such as Eastman Kodak and Westinghouse, adopted Udylite's plating processes. The Udylite Process Company was sold in 1921 and became the Udylite Company.

In November 1919, Udy went west to Leesburg, Idaho, to manage the Haynes Stellite Company's cobalt mine.

Udy subsequently returned to Niagara Falls, New York as a research and development engineer for the Electro Metallurgical Company. He began to study the plating of chromium and how to apply his techniques to commercial use.

In 1931, Udy joined Swann Chemical Company in Anniston, Alabama. As a member of their research department, he furthered electric furnace research using calcium carbide, phosphorus, and other materials. While at Swann, he developed novel techniques for producing phosphoric acid and silicon alloys.

After completing his work at Swann, Udy returned to Niagara Falls, New York in 1934 as an engineer for Oldbury Electrochemical Company. He continued his research into the production of phosphorus.

In 1938, Udy developed "Chrom-X" for the Chromium Mining and Smelting Company. "Chrom-X" is a type of ferrochromium produced from low-grade ores. Udy designed an electric smelting furnace that allowed smelteries to extract chromium, copper, zinc, and manganese from low-grade ore.

To convert a variety of grades and types of iron ores into semi-refined steel, Udy invented the Strategic-Udy process for Strategic Materials Corp. Using this new process, Udy was able to bypass the blast furnace, coke oven, and open hearth furnace that traditionally had been used for this purpose. In 1955, his process for treating low-grade manganese ore for use in the steel industry was announced. Strategic Materials Corp. subsequently formed two new companies, Strategic-Udy Metallurgical and Chemical Processes, Ltd., in Niagara Falls, Ontario, and the Strategic-Udy Processes, Inc., in Niagara Falls, New York. The New York plant focused on industrial research while the Ontario installation operated as an experimental plant with a prototype electric furnace.

=== Patent Dispute ===
In his article "History of Chromium Plating," George Dubpernell incorrectly stated that Udy had copied the prior work of Dr. Colin G. Fink relating to discoveries involving the electrodepositing of chromium. In 1925, Fink had documented and patented a process of electrodepositing chromium in 1926. Udy's documentation proved that Udy had begun development of the process in 1922 and had completed his work in December 1923. In 1936, the United States Court of Appeals for the Second Circuit determined that "the evidence clearly establishes prior invention of the essential principles by Marvin J. Udy," and concluded that Udy's patent application should have been granted rather than Fink's. The court further determined that Fink's patent "must be held invalid."

=== Senate hearings on minerals, materials and fuels ===
In March 1958, Udy was called to Washington, D.C. as an expert witness to testify before the United States Senate Subcommittee on Minerals, Materials and Fuels. The purpose of the hearings was to determine how best Congress could support the reestablishment of the mining and minerals industries in the United States, reduce unemployment in United States' mines and keep the United States' mineral extractive industries a meaningful part of the mobilization base necessary for national security.

== Community service ==
Udy served as the vice-chairman of the Electrochemical Society from 1951 to 1954 and as president from 1954 to 1955. In his presidential address, entitled "Joy in Service," delivered in Cincinnati, Ohio in 1955, he stated that he found great pleasure in serving the Society to the best of his ability.

Udy was the driving force behind the construction of a chapel for the Church of Jesus Christ of Latter-day Saints in Niagara Falls, New York. Construction was completed in 1954. At the time of his death, Udy was serving as the Branch President for his congregation.

== Death ==
On 11 April 1959, Udy died of a heart attack at his home in Niagara Falls, New York. He is buried with his wife and sons at Acacia Park Cemetery in North Tonawanda, New York.
