= Von Rydingsvard =

Von Rydingsvard is a surname. Notable people with the surname include:

- Karl von Rydingsvärd, Swedish-American furniture maker and teacher
- Ursula von Rydingsvard (born 1942), American sculptor
