= John Woodrow Wilson =

American artist

John Wilson
- Wilson in 1986
- Born: 1922; Roxbury, Massachusetts, U.S.
- Died: January 22, 2015; Brookline, Massachusetts, U.S.
- Education: Tufts University

John Wilson (1922 – January 22, 2015) was an American lithographer, sculptor, painter, muralist, and art teacher whose art was driven by the political climate of his time. Wilson was best known for his works portraying themes of social justice and equality.

== Family and early life ==
Wilson, commonly referred to by his professional name John Woodrow Wilson, was born the second of five children in Roxbury, Massachusetts in 1922. Both of Wilson's parents were immigrants from British Guiana, a British colony in South America that is known today as Guyana. They emigrated to America a few years before Wilson was born. British Guiana had a plantation-based economy with sugar being the main good produced. In the colony, Wilson's parents came from a middle-class background. Wilson's maternal grandfather managed a refining plant in British Guiana and the sugar produced at his plant was so pure that the owners of the plantation, who lived in Great Britain, received national prizes almost annually. Wilson's maternal grandfather was transferred to Jamaica, so all of his children except for Wilson's mother, who at that point was married and already had their first daughter, relocated there. Wilson's father stayed in British Guiana because he had been trained as a technician in the sugar industry. One of Wilson's paternal great aunts died when his family was still living in British Guiana. The woman was very rich and left each of her nieces and nephews a portion of her wealth. Wilson recalls his father telling him this woman "was so wealthy, she left money to her cats." His father used the money his aunt gave him to open up a variety store.

Wilson was very aware of the racial inequalities that surrounded him, even at a very young age. In a 2012 interview, Wilson talked about remembering the newspapers his father would read, like The Amsterdam News, which had images of lynchings in "every other issue." A mix of his political views and his intense interest in art led him create the important political statement pieces that he makes through the later years in his life.

== Education and career ==
In Boston, Wilson took art classes at Roxbury Memorial High School and was the art editor of the school newspaper. He also took many classes at the Boys Club from teachers who were students at the school of the Museum of Fine Arts. After getting his work shown to faculty at the school via his teachers from the Boys Club, he received a full scholarship to the Museum of Fine Arts School, eventually graduating with high honors in 1945. In 1947, Wilson graduated from Tufts University while teaching at Boris Mirski School of Modern Art. He won the James William Paige Traveling Fellowship and moved to Paris soon after. Wilson lived in Paris through the MFA fellowship and studied with the modern artist Fernand Léger. After returning from Paris, he joined the faculty of the museum school in 1949 where he was to teach second-year painting and some elementary courses.

In 1950, he married Julie Kowtich, a teacher who had graduated from Brooklyn College. Wilson and Kowitch were an interracial couple and were forced to drive in separate cars when they traveled in the Southern United States. He won a John Hay Whitney fellowship, and the two lived in Mexico for five years. Wilson looked up to Mexican painter José Clemente Orozco, whose work focused primarily on political murals that inspired Wilson. Orozco had already died when Wilson arrived. In Mexico, Wilson was drawn to mural paintings due to their accessibility to anyone regardless of one's means to get into museums or collections.

Artist Elizabeth Catlett was also living, painting and sculpting there. She was studying printmaking at the Taller de Gráfica Popular (Graphic Arts Workshop), where Wilson also studied the technique. Chicago artist Margaret Burroughs wrote about visiting them both in 1951. When Wilson returned to the United States in 1956, he made artwork for labor unions in Chicago and taught for a bit in New York City before returning to Massachusetts in 1964 to teach at Boston University. He stayed there until 1986.

Julie Kowitch says that her husband, "felt that his main objective as an artist was to deliver a message to people about black dignity, about racial justice, about poor people trying to get a better deal in life." Wilson's daughter, Erica, said that he drew wherever he went and whatever he could find. For example, when driving to New York City with Erica and her son, Wilson drew a series of sketches of his infant grandson.

== Exhibitions and awards ==
By the time he was in his early 20s, Wilson was winning awards for his work. Soon after he left Tufts, the Museum of Fine Arts added a lithograph "Streetcar Scene" from 1945 into its collection. The image was used for the cover of the exhibition "Alone in a Crowd" in 1992. Smith College purchased "My Brother (1942)" while Wilson was a student at the museum school. It was part of a traveling exhibition that came to the college.

In 1963 artist/educator, Hale Woodruff chose him as one of 24 Black artists to be featured in Ebony magazine's special edition commemorating the 100th anniversary of the Emancipation Proclamation. The article noted that he belonged to the "nation's elite of portrait painters." He was a fixture in the annual Atlanta University "Exhibition of Paintings, Sculpture, and Prints by Negro Artists of America," which ran from 1942 to 1970. The exhibition, commonly referred to as the "Atlanta Annual" and founded by Woodruff, pulled together works by Black artists from across the United States at a time when white galleries and museums refused to show their works. In the early 1970s, some works in the collection were shown in a traveling exhibit.

At the annuals, the winning artists received payment for their submissions, which became part of the university's art collection. Among Wilson's awards and participation:

1943 - John Hope Award for his oil "Black Soldier."

1944 – First Atlanta University Award for "Roxbury Landscape" and the lithograph "Adolescence."

1945 – Purchase Award for "Portrait of Clair." He received a large number of popular votes for "Black Despair" but did not win the top prize.

1946 – Exhibited but no win.

1947 – First Atlanta University Purchase Award for the oil painting "Church."

1948 – Exhibited but no win.

1949 – Exhibited but no win.

1950 – Honorable mention for the lithograph "Boulevard de Strasbourg."

1951 – Print prize for the lithograph "Trabajador" and runner-up for the Purchase Prize for "Black Despair."

1952 – Graphic arts prize for the lithograph "LaCalle."

1954 - Purchase Award for the watercolor "Roxbury Rooftops" and first place in prints for "Mother and Child."

1955 – Top cash award for "Negro Woman."

1957 – Second prize in watercolors for "Black Despair" and first prize in prints for "Mother and Child."

1960 – Honorable mention in the watercolors category.

1961 – Honorable mention in "figures in oil" for "Man Resting" and "landscape in oil" for "Mirmande."

1964 - Honorable mention in graphics category for "Urbanites."

1965 – First prize in graphics category for "Father and Child."

1966 – Second prize in graphics category for "City Child" and honorable mention for "Black Boy."

1969 – First prize in graphics for "Child with father."

In 1948, his work was among those chosen by Woodruff for a collection being formed by IBM. Others included Romare Bearden, Charles Alston, Jacob Lawrence, Norman Lewis, Frank Neal, Selma Burke, Ellis Wilson, Dox Thrash and photographer Roy DeCarava. In 1969, he was among artists in an exhibit at the Studio Museum of Harlem titled "Fourteen Black Artists From Boston." The works were first shown at the National Center of Afro-American Artists in Boston and the Rose Art Museum of Brandeis University in Waltham, MA.

In 1976, the Los Angeles County Museum of Art curated a traveling show titled "Two Centuries of Black American Art" where Wilson was represented. His work "Street Children" was entered in the Black Enterprise Winter Art Exhibition in 1978. The works were hung in the magazine's offices. In 1992, his drawing "Streetcar Scene (1945)" was featured on the cover of the catalog for the traveling exhibit "Alone in a Crowd: Prints by African-American Artists of the 1930s-1940s" of works in the collection of Reba and Dave Williams. The exhibit was shown at the Brooklyn Museum, the Art Institute of Chicago and the Baltimore Museum of Art, among others.

In 1995, Wilson had an exhibit of his own work at the Museum of Fine Arts called "Dialogue: John Wilson/Joseph Norman". The exhibit consisted of many of Wilson's sculptures and sketches. In 1996, he was represented in a traveling exhibit titled "In the Spirit of Resistance: African-American Modernists and the Mexican Muralist School" that focused on the influence of Mexico's graphics workshop on Black artists during the 1930s, 1940s and 1950s. Also included were works by Mexican artists and photos of murals by both groups. The exhibit was sponsored by the Studio Museum of Harlem and Mexican Museum in San Francisco.

In 2003, he was included in an exhibition of artwork from the Atlanta University collection on display at the Clark Atlanta University Art Galleries and titled "Remembering the Atlanta University Art Annuals."

In 2004, he received the James Van Der Zee award from the Brandywine Workshop in Philadelphia. "I can't remember when I was not doing some sort of visual art," he said at the time. "This career has been very satisfying, gratifying and there is nothing else I could conceive of myself doing." In 20l9, the Yale University Art Gallery mounted a traveling exhibit titled "Reckoning with 'The Incident': John Wilson's Studies for a Lynching Mural', which focused on Wilson's 1952 mural that he painted while at La Esmeralda, the national school of art in Mexico. The mural, which no longer exists, shows the lynching of a Black man by the Ku Klux Klan as a Black family looks on. The exhibit contained his sketches, painted studies and related prints and drawings.

== Major works ==
=== Political pieces ===
Wilson was championed for his ability to fuse his artistic creativity with his passion for politics and social justice. Wilson's most famous and viewed work is the bronze bust of Martin Luther King Jr. that stands three feet tall in the Capitol Rotunda in Washington, D.C.. He won the sculptural commission in 1985 as part of a national competition to create a memorial statue of the civil rights leader. The bust was revealed in the Rotunda on January 15, 1986, which would have been King's 57th birthday. Although both men have ties to Boston University, they never met. In the original etching, Wilson portrays King's physical presence as a haunting vulnerability coupled with unwavering strength, while symbolizing King's assassination through the crosshairs of vertical and horizontal lines that intersect at King's throat that effectively silence the voice of the prolifically outspoken equal rights activist.

One of Wilson's most overtly politically charged works, a lithograph called "Deliver Us From Evil," was created while he was a student of the School of the Museum of Fine Arts in 1943. In this piece, he comments on the paradoxical nature of World War II, critiquing the United States for fighting for democratic rights in Europe while simultaneously denying African-American citizens those same rights. The left side of the image shows a concentration camp, Nazi soldiers, and Jewish victims, while the right side shows run-down tenement buildings, a lynch mob, and African-American victims. However, despite his criticism of the American government, he did support the war in theory, as he was against fascism and anti-Semitism.

Another critical work by Wilson is the lithograph "Streetcar Scene," created in 1945. In this scene, a lone Black man sits on a streetcar, surrounded by white women. While all of the other passengers seem to be absentmindedly looking away into different directions, the Black man looks directly at the viewer. This creates the effect of identification between the viewer and the subject, as it begs the viewer to "ponder the burdens and responsibilities of his wartime life." With this work, Wilson is criticizing Franklin D. Roosevelt's integration of factories. Wilson was quoted saying, "I resented the fact that almost everyone on my block was on welfare until they needed us in the shipyards and factories." The subject of this lithograph is one of the Boston Navy Yard workers, wearing workman's coveralls, a cap, and holding a metal lunchbox, riding alongside fashionable women. The rich color palette is made up of mostly reds, whites, and browns, evoking a feeling of warmth from the painting.

Wilson experimented with other mediums in his earlier years, such as his 1946 ink drawing "Man with Cigarette." The bold lines and shadows in this work in addition to the diagonal composition of the bust create a sense of urgency. The man depicted also seems to share the same sensitive expression that is characteristic of Wilson's portraits, which is used to express Wilson's concerns regarding the African American experience in the United States at the time. He described the country as "a world that promised freedom and opportunity for anyone who worked hard… but clearly if you are black you realize that these nice sounding phrases did not include you."

Wilson's method for creating profound art can be seen in the sketches he made in preparation for the bust of King. The original drawing has been in Boston's Museum of Fine Arts since 1997. When a request was made to display the drawing in another museum for an extended exhibition, Wilson decided to create a print of it rather than expose the original work to the intense lighting in the exhibition space. The result was a "sensitive" depiction of the civil rights hero, which "focuses on King's face, manipulating the rich lights and darks of the etching by scraping and burnishing the plate." He humanizes King by tilting his head and by giving the face "an almost weary expression" that "emphasizes King's profound humanity in his struggle for equality." Eventually, the Museum of Fine Arts purchased this print, along with the copper plate and the nineteen working proofs that Wilson made. This group of works make it possible to understand Wilson's process for making art and are effective in teaching students about printmaking techniques. Wilson's raw and powerful depictions of Martin Luther King, Jr. convey his indirect involvement with the civil rights movement. Even though he did not actively participate in the movement, he did remark that King was "a very important symbol" in his life.

Wilson illustrated several children's books, including Jean C. George's "Spring Comes to the Ocean," 1965; Joan Lexau's "Striped Ice Cream," 1968; Willis Oliver's "New Worlds of Reading," 1959, and one by his wife titled "Becky" in 1967. "Striped Ice Cream" and "Malcolm X" can be found at the Princeton University Library. Additionally, Wilson's drawing "Steel Worker" was used for the cover design of The Reporter on July 23, 1959, and is currently housed in the Princeton University Art Museum. In 1969, one of his paintings was among 27 chosen by author June Jordan for her book of poetry "Who Look At Me."

== Influences ==
In 1952, Wilson made the lithograph "The Trial" depicting a young black man awaiting a pronouncement from three looming white judges. This lithograph is now in the Brooklyn Museum. Wilson was very interested by murals and was influenced by the painted José Clemente Orozco. He saw murals as a way to reach a wider, more diverse audience who did not have the means to visit art museums.

Many artists of the Harlem Renaissance intended their art to make people happy and proud. But Wilson, coming a generation later and living through the Civil Rights Movement in the United States, wanted his art to convey a message and make people think. In an interview with the Boston Globe in 1986, Wilson explained why he sculpted the bust of King in the way that he did. He said "the head is tilted forward, as if to communicate with the viewer. I hope the sculpture will stimulate people to learn more about King, to perpetuate his struggle." When Wilson described the bust, he went beyond the physical markings of the head, saying "to [him] the eloquence of the piece is not only in the face, but in the rhythms of the gesture."

== Praise and legacy ==
Wilson died on Thursday, January 22, 2015, at his home in Brookline, MA. He was 92 years old. His art continues to make an impact. In Wilson's career survey, "Eternal Presence" of 2012, Boston Globe art critic Sebastian Smee said he is one of "Boston's most esteemed and accomplished artists." Following Wilson's intent to spark political discussion, Smee stated that Wilson's sketches and charcoal drawings are "an impulse toward clarity, toward truth." Wilson helped found a museum called the National Center of Afro-American Artists (NCAAA) in Roxbury, where he was born. In this museum is an exhibit honoring his life and work titled "John Wilson Remembered 1923–2015." This temporary exhibit included many of his sculptures and graphic art.

His work was featured around Boston throughout his life, including pieces of art in the Museum of Fine Arts and at Martha Richardson Fine Art.

From February 8–June 22, 2025, the Museum of Fine Arts Boston exhibited Witnessing Humanity: The Art of John Wilson. The exhibit included over 100 works, including paintings, sculptures and prints, made over the course of his career and was co-organized by the Museum of Fine Arts and the Metropolitan Museum of Art. The Metropolitan Museum of Art exhibited it from September 20, 2025–February 8, 2026, and was Wilson’s first solo museum show in New York.

== Selected Collections ==
- Boston Athenaeum
- United States Capitol rotunda
- Metropolitan Museum of Art
- Museum of Fine Arts Boston
- Museum of Modern Art
- Minneapolis Institute of Art
- Indiana University Art Museum
- Princeton University Art Museum
- Muscarelle Museum of Art
- Clark Atlanta University
- Tufts University
- Library of Congress
- Smith College
- Smithsonian American Art Museum
- Art Institute of Chicago
- Philadelphia Museum of Art
- National Gallery of Art
- Cleveland Museum of Art
