= Boston State College =

Public university in Massachusetts, US (1852–1982)

- Motto: Education for Service
- Type: Public
- Active: 1872–1982 (merged into the University of Massachusetts Boston)
- Location: Boston, Massachusetts, U.S.
- Campus: Urban
- Nickname: Warriors

Boston State College was a normal school from 1852 to 1872 and a public university from 1872 to 1982 in Boston, Massachusetts, United States. It was merged into the University of Massachusetts Boston in 1982.

== History ==
Boston State College's roots began with the Girls' High School, which was founded in 1852. In 1872, the Boston Normal School separated from Girls' High School and became an independent institution, although it still occupied the building alongside the high school and Girls' Latin School. The Normal School was renamed the Teachers College of the City of Boston in 1924. In 1952, it became a state college, the State Teachers College at Boston. The college was renamed the State College at Boston, also known as Boston State College, in 1960.

Boston State College merged with the University of Massachusetts Boston in 1982. After the merger, in the mid-1980s, its former main campus, located at 621 Huntington Avenue, was acquired by the Massachusetts College of Art, and serves as that institution's primary campus.

== Notable faculty ==
- Bob Barney, associate professor of physical education (1970–1972)
- Martin Grossack, psychology teacher
- Karl von Rydingsvärd woodcarving and design teacher at Boston Normal School (prior to 1891)
- Harry Kemelman, English professor (1960s)
- William J. Leary, associate professor in continuing studies

== Notable alumni ==
- Jack Beatty – writer and radio commentator
- Bill Berglund – ice hockey player
- Edward G. Connolly – politician
- Michael L. Coyne – lawyer
- Richard Curwin – professor
- Mike Gorman – Boston Celtics play-by-play announcer
- Bob Hall – two-time Boston Marathon wheelchair champion
- Daniel Anthony Hart – prelate
- Mel King – politician, teacher, and community organizer
- Bruce Lehane – Cross country coach at Boston University
- Peter Petrigno – politician, teacher, and community organizer.
- Dan Rea – television and radio journalist
- Francis Roache – Boston Police Commissioner from 1985 to 1993
- Edward F. Shea – federal judge
- Anna Tolman Smith – educator, writer, editor
- Robert Travaglini – politician
- John Tsang – civil servant and Financial Secretary of Hong Kong
- Gladys Wood – Boston Public Schools' first Black principal
