= Harriet Forte Kennedy =

American opera singer

Hariett Forte Kennedy
- Born: Harriet Arline Forte Kennedy; November 22, 1931; Cambridge, Massachusetts, U.S.
- Died: February 12, 1994 (aged 63); Medford, Massachusetts, U.S.
- Education: Northeastern University (BA)

Harriet Arline Forte Kennedy (November 22, 1931 – February 12, 1994) was an American museum administrator, sculptor, and singer.

== Early life and education ==
Born in Cambridge, Massachusetts, Kennedy was educated in local schools before attending the Massachusetts College of Art, the Institute of Art Administration at Harvard University, and Northeastern University, where she received a bachelor's degree. She studied at the School of the Museum of Fine Arts, Boston from 1960 to 1965, and undertook graduate studies at Boston University in 1965.

== Career ==
She began her career with the Museum of Fine Arts, Boston before becoming assistant director of the Museum of Afro-American Artists. Kennedy was also a coloratura soprano who sang at venues throughout the Boston area.

== Personal life ==
Kennedy died in Medford, Massachusetts 1994. She has three children, including a foster daughter.
