= Anna Tolman Smith =

American educator

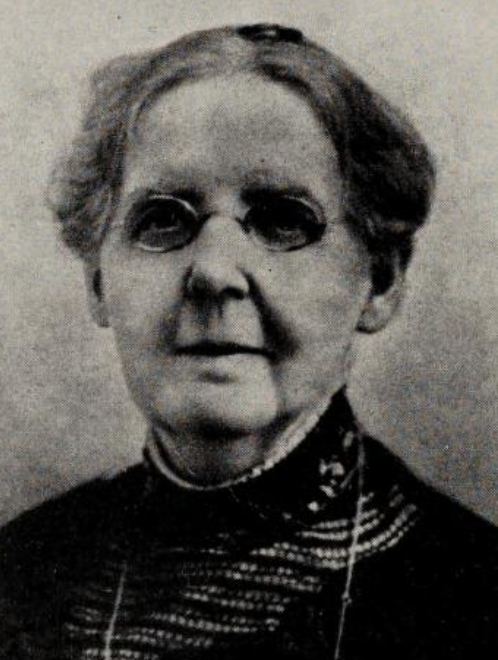
- Anna Tolman Smith, from a 1935 publication of the US Department of the Interior
- Born: January 4, 1840; Boston, Massachusetts
- Died: August 28, 1917; Washington, D.C.
- Occupation(s): Educator, editor, writer

Anna Tolman Smith (January 4, 1840 – August 28, 1917) was an American educator, editor, and writer. She worked for the US Office of Education from 1879 until 1917, usually writing reports on comparative education topics. She was decorated by the French government for her work.

== Early life ==
Smith was born in Boston, Massachusetts. She graduated from the Boston Normal School in 1860.

== Career ==
In 1865, Smith and her sister, Abbie M. Condron, started Park Seminary, a girls' school in Washington, D.C. In 1879, she joined the Bureau of Education, a federal office. From 1886 to her death in 1917, Smith wrote a monthly column, "Foreign Notes", for the journal Education. She worked on the editorial staff on Paul Monroe's Cyclopedia of Education, for which she also wrote over 30 articles. She spoke at meetings of the National Education Association. and served on the NEA's executive board.

Smith attended the Exposition Universelle in Paris in 1900, as part of her work for the US Office of Education in Washington, D.C. While there, she was named an "Officier de l'Instruction Publique" by the French government.

== Publications ==
Smith wrote many published reports for the Bureau of Education. She also wrote articles for scholarly and professional journals, including The Journal of American Folklore, The Elementary School Teacher, and Journal of Education.

- Rural schools : progress in the past : means of improvement in the future (1884)
- The Coeducation of the Sexes in the United States (1894)
- "Some Nursery Rhymes of Korea" (1897)
- Education in Canada (1899)
- "From Rousseau to Froebel" (1902)
- "The Enrichment of the Teacher's Ideal" (1903)
- The education bill of 1906 for England and Wales as it past the House of Commons (1906)
- The Montessori system of education : an examination of characteristic features set forth in Il metodo della pedagogica scientifica (1912)
- Survey of education in foreign countries in 1911-12 (1913, with W. Carson Ryan)
- Compulsory school attendance (1914, with W. S. Deffenbaugh, W. Carson Ryan, and William H. Hand)
- Education in Foreign Countries, 1915 (1915)
- Secondary schools in the states of Central America, South America, and the West Indies : scholastic scope and standards (1915, with Arthur MacDonald)
- Education in Turkey (1916)
- Demand for vocational education in the countries at war (1917)
- Higher technical education in foreign countries : standards and scope (1917, with W. S. Jesien)
- "The Bureau of Education in Wartime" (1917)

== Personal life ==
Smith died in 1917, aged 77 years, in Washington, D.C. In reporting her death, the New England Journal of Education noted that "Anna Tolman Smith was a great asset to the bureau of education, a notable figure in American education, a noble inspiration to educational leaders for half a century."
