= Elma Lewis =

American arts educator (1921–2004)

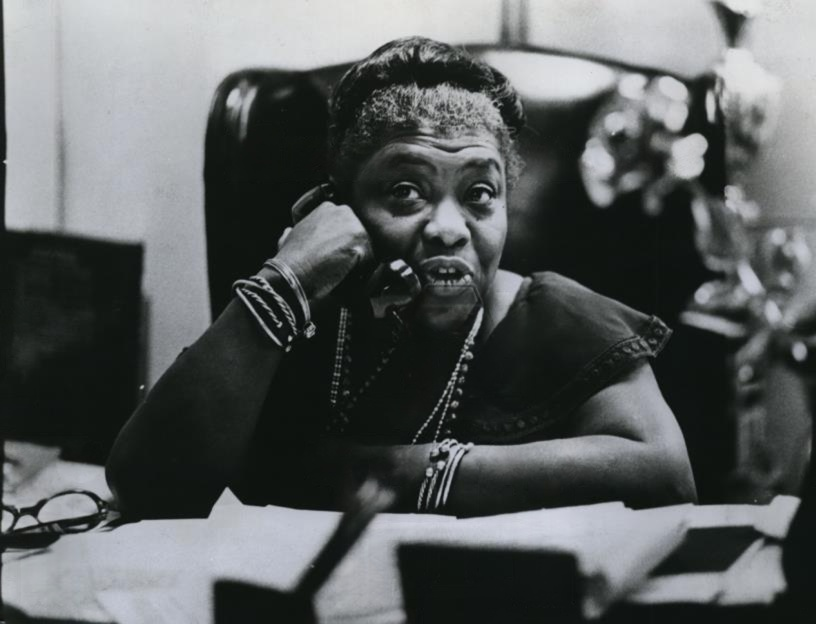
- Lewis in 1975
- Born: Elma Ina Lewis; 15 September 1921; Boston, Massachusetts, U.S.
- Died: 1 January 2004 (aged 82); Boston, Massachusetts, U.S.
- Occupations: Arts educator, activist
- Parent(s): Clairmont Lewis; Edwardine Lewis

Elma Ina Lewis (September 15, 1921 – January 1, 2004) was an American arts educator and the founder of The Elma Lewis School of Fine Arts and the National Center of Afro-American Artists. In 1981 she was one of the first recipients of the newly organized MacArthur Fellows Grant, in 1981, and in 1983 was awarded a Presidential Medal for the Arts by President Ronald Reagan. She is also an honorary member of Alpha Kappa Alpha sorority.

== Early life and education ==
Lewis was born September 15, 1921, in Boston to parents Clairmont and Edwardine Lewis; they had immigrated to the United States from Barbados. Lewis had two older brothers, Darnley and George, from her mother's previous marriage. She attended the Ruggles Street Nursery School in 1924. The mother and daughter were told the girl's IQ was higher than it would be when she grew older. That memory stayed with Lewis and would eventually prompt her to start her own school later on.

Her parents were followers of Jamaican activist Marcus Garvey, who had immigrated to the US. Lewis ascribed to his ideas the basis of her racial pride and desire to promote African culture. Lewis attended Roxbury Memorial High School for Girls, where she studied voice, piano, and dance. Her first dance teacher was Doris Jones of the Jones-Haywood School of Ballet in Roxbury.

She worked her way through college by acting in local theatre productions, and graduated from Emerson College (B.L.I., 1943). She completed her Master's in Education at Boston University School of Education in 1944.

== Career ==
After graduating from Boston University, Lewis taught speech therapy at Massachusetts Mental Health Center, the New England Hospital, and the Habit Clinic of Boston. She also taught dance and drama at the Cambridge Community Center and fine arts at the Harriet Tubman House.

At age 23, Lewis and her parents moved from Dudley Street in Roxbury to a house on Homestead Street, where she lived until her death. In 1951 Lewis's mother Edwardine died. Her brother Darnley moved into the downstairs section of the house with his wife and kids.

== Arts education ==
=== The Elma Lewis School of Fine Arts (ELSFA) ===
In 1950 Lewis founded The Elma Lewis School of Fine Arts to provide arts education for the African-American community in Boston: it was to offer a comprehensive program across the visual and performing arts. The teaching program at the school was focused on building character and providing multidisciplinary arts instruction through performance and exhibitions. Her school attracted many top professionals in the fine arts as teachers, resulting in a very rigorous program. At its peak, the school enrolled 700 students and employed 100 teachers. Many of the school's graduates went on to successful careers in entertainment.

Many attribute the notoriety of Lewis's school to the political culture of the time. Boston experienced a social crisis in the mid-1970s after court-ordered desegregation of schools. Due to financial problems, enrollment in the school begin to dwindle. After years of battling financial crisis and owing back taxes, the school lost its property in 1997 through foreclosure.

=== National Center of Afro-American Artists (NCAAA) ===
Lewis founded the National Center of Afro-American Artists, which served as an umbrella organization for the school, local arts groups, and a museum. The building complex, which looked over Franklin Park, was previously the site of Temple Mishkan Tefila and its adjoining school. Jewish philanthropists turned over the buildings for Lewis's use as part of their move out of the city to suburban locations.

Before acquiring this site, the school had operated in several locations, which caused financial problems through the years. By the 1980s, the center was in debt up to $720,000. The annual production of Langston Hughes’s Black Nativity became a staple of the organization. Each year Lewis directed the production.

=== Technical Theatre Program ===
Lewis developed the Technical Theatre Program at the Massachusetts Correctional Institute, Norfolk. A total of 750 inmates at Norfolk Prison enrolled in the program; they put on performances and learned skills such as backstage production, acting, and musical composition. In 1972 the work of ten artist/inmates was published in an anthology: Who Took the Weight? Black Voices from Norfolk Prison, with a foreword by Lewis.

== Later life ==
=== Awards and affiliations ===
Lewis was elected as a Fellow of the American Academy of Arts and Sciences in 1977. She was involved in promoting African-American culture through art forms.

She served as a board member for various organizations, including the American Academy of Arts and Sciences, Congressional Black Caucus, Metropolitan Cultural Alliance, and NAACP.

Lewis also received the Commonwealth Award, Massachusetts’ highest award in the arts, and myriad other honors, including nearly thirty honorary doctorates from various universities. In October 2003, the National Visionary Leadership Project, in ceremonies at Washington's J. F. Kennedy Center for the Performing Arts, named Miss Lewis, along with Ray Charles and John Hope Franklin, as a "Visionary Elder." She is commemorated on the Boston Women's Heritage Trail. In 1973, Lewis received a $350,000 grant from the Rockefeller Foundation to update the school and pay the salaries of the school's staff. In 1981, Lewis was awarded a 'genius grant' by the John D. and Catherine MacArthur Foundation. This grant was part of a five-year program whereby 21 MacArthur Prize Fellows would be awarded a yearly sum for their creative achievements. In 1983 she received the Presidential Medal for Arts from President Reagan. In 1986 Lewis received the Monarch Award from the National Council for Culture and Art. Each year the Council awarded two individuals for live achievements in the performing and visual arts. In 2023, Lewis was honored with a banner on Blue Hill Ave in Boston as part of the Black Women Lead project which honors Black women who have shaped or led Boston.

=== Community involvement ===
Lewis became known as the "Grande Dame" of Arts in Roxbury due to her school, achievements in performing arts, and her community involvement. Lewis often traveled around the world to speak at conferences and inform on the state of African-American culture, as well as her experiences in running the NCAAA.

In 1980, Lewis was diagnosed with diabetes. She continued to spearhead cultural programs throughout Boston. She started the Elma Lewis Playhouse in Franklin Park during the summer months, which also boasted such musical artists ranging from jazz composer Duke Ellington to symphony conductor Arthur Fiedler. She further launched a clean-up campaign to remove debris and drug paraphernalia from Franklin Park. The Elma Lewis Playhouse was renamed the "Elma Lewis Theater at Franklin Park" in 2003.

In September 1996, Roxbury hosted a salute to the “Grande Dame,” a three-day birthday celebration of Lewis's achievements and life. It included events at many venues around the city and attracted prominent members of society, including poet Maya Angelou and the UN Ambassador. Lewis was beginning to suffer from severe complications of diabetes. For her 76th birthday, she collected papers, photographs, musical notes, and other memorabilia to give to Northeastern University for a living archive.

=== Death ===
On January 1, 2004, Elma Lewis died at the age of 82 in her Boston home from pulmonary complications stemming from diabetes.
