= Thayer Academy =

Prep school in Braintree, Massachusetts, US

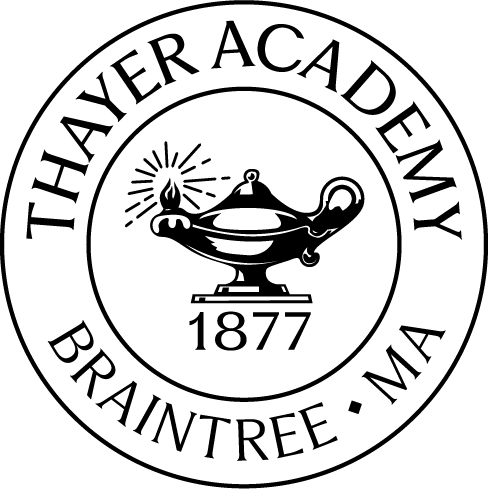

Location
- 745 Washington Street; Braintree, Massachusetts 02184; United States; 42°12′30″N 71°0′20″W

Information
- Type: Private
- Established: 1877; 149 years ago
- Founder: Sylvanus Thayer
- Head of school: Chris Fortunato
- Grades: 5–12
- Gender: Co-educational
- Enrollment: 752
- Student to teacher ratio: 5:1
- Campus size: 34 acres
- Campus type: Suburban
- Colors: Black & orange
- Athletics conference: Independent School League
- Team name: Tigers
- Accreditation: NEASC
- Endowment: 80 million
- Website: www.thayer.org

Thayer Academy (TA) is a private, co-educational, college-preparatory day school located in Braintree, Massachusetts, United States. The academy, conceived in 1871 at the bequest of General Sylvanus Thayer, known as the father of the United States Military Academy at West Point, and founder of the Thayer School of Engineering at Dartmouth College, was established in 1877. Thayer annually enrolls approximately 523 students in the Upper School (grades 9–12) and an additional 229 students in the Middle School (grades 5–8). The 34-acre (14 ha) campus is situated in the heart of Braintree and consists of eight buildings and 54 classrooms. Students are drawn primarily from Boston's MetroWest and South Shore communities.

== History ==
General Thayer, born in Braintree, Massachusetts, graduated as valedictorian from both Dartmouth College and the United States Military Academy at West Point, New York. General Thayer was dedicated to hard work, and at the age of 17, he taught in the local schools of Hanover, New Hampshire to earn money to pay for college – an early sign of the importance he attached to teaching and education. He was Superintendent of the Military Academy at West Point from 1817–1833. General Thayer's 1871 will provided for the creation of Thayer Academy, and on September 12, 1877, the Academy opened its doors to 30 students in what is now Main Building. Glover opened sometime later in 1894. The junior school (grades 5–8), Thayerlands, opened in 1924 and quickly grew to include eight grades as well as kindergarten and nursery school. Beginning in 1969, the lower grades were gradually eliminated, and Thayerlands became Thayer Academy Middle School. Thayer has been a co-educational institution since its founding.

== Athletics ==
Thayer's athletic teams participate in the competitive Independent School League (ISL), the oldest independent school athletic association in the United States.

== Notable alumni ==
- Tony Amonte '89, professional athlete, former NHL and Olympic athlete; member of the U.S. Hockey Hall of Fame
- John Cheever, Pulitzer Prize winning author (did not graduate)
- Charlie Coyle, current professional hockey player for the Boston Bruins
- William D. Delahunt '59, U.S. Representative, 10th District (MA-D)
- John Curtis Gowan, psychologist
- Corey Griffin, philanthropist and co-founder of the Ice Bucket Challenge to raise funds for Amyotrophic lateral sclerosis research
- David Grossack '73, attorney
- Kelly Amonte Hiller '92, head lacrosse coach at Northwestern University
- Mike Jones '03, basketball player, University of Maryland Terrapins
- Tiffany Kelly '05, Miss Massachusetts USA 2006
- Asa S. Knowles, educator and president of Northeastern University from 1959 to 1975
- Mike Mottau '96, hockey player, Hobey Baker Award winner
- Mike Moyer '90, author
- Brooks Orpik '98, hockey player, Washington Capitals
- Jared Porter '99, former baseball executive
- Jeremy Roenick '88, professional athlete, former NHL and Olympic athlete, member of the U.S. Hockey Hall of Fame
- Dave Silk '76, former professional ice hockey player
- General Gordon R. Sullivan '55, United States Army general, Chief of Staff of the Army and a member of the Joint Chiefs of Staff
- Ryan Whitney '01, hockey player, Anaheim Ducks
- Mary Parker Follett graduated 1885, social worker known as the "Mother of Modern Management"
- Frank N. Newman '59, international banking executive; served as Deputy Secretary of the U.S. Treasury Department
- Charles Castleman '57, violinist and teacher
- Frederick C. Murphy '39, Medal of Honor recipient during World War II
- Bradley Birkenfeld '83, private banker, convicted felon, and whistleblower
- John W. Beal, former Massachusetts Commissioner for Public Works (dropped out)
- Asa P. French, former United States Attorney for the District of Massachusetts, served as legal counsel to the Rockefeller Family
- Ella Lyman Cabot, educator, author and lecturer
- Armand Zildjian, Armenian-American manufacturer of cymbals and the former head of the Avedis Zildjian Company
- Enrico Cappucci, politician who served as a member of the Massachusetts House of Representatives
- Adam Gaudette, '15, Hobey Baker Award winner and current professional hockey player
- Carmelo Travieso, Puerto Rican basketball player for UMass Amherst
- Austin Gallagher, American marine biologist and social entrepreneur, best known for his research on sharks and his role as founder and CEO of Beneath the Waves, a non-profit organization focusing on ocean conservation.
- Michael J. Connor, retired United States Navy Vice Admiral and former Commander of the United States Submarine Forces
- Richard Wassersug, scientist, honorary professor in the Department of Cellular and Physiological Sciences at the University of British Columbia
- David Hemery, former track and field athlete, Olympian
- Leif Tilden, American actor, director, and writer
- Richard Prince, American painter and photographer
- Suzanne Ciani, American musician, sound designer, and composer
- Dick Mills former Major League Baseball pitcher for Boston Red Sox
- Ryan Ashton, American actor
- Jay O'Brien, ice hockey player
- Brian Gibbons, former NHL hockey player
- Samuel Okunlola '22, college football defensive end for the Colorado Buffaloes
- Samson Okunlola '23, college football offensive tackle for the Miami Hurricanes
- Ally Sentnor '21, soccer player

== Notable teachers ==
- Robert Vonnoh Famous American Impressionist
