= David Grossack =

- Born: David C. Grossack; 1956; Honolulu, Territory of Hawaii
- Died: September 20, 2017 (aged 60–61)
- Education: Thayer Academy; Brandeis University; Babson College (BS); New England School of Law (JD)
- Occupations: Attorney; writer; activist
- Parent(s): Martin Grossack; Judith Grossack

David C. Grossack (1956 – September 20, 2017) was an American attorney, writer, and activist born in Honolulu, Hawaii. He is the son of noted psychotherapist and author Dr. Martin Grossack and Judith Grossack. David was named one of the state's ten best lawyers by the Boston Herald, and received a coveted "Lawyer of the Year" award from Massachusetts Lawyers Weekly.

== Education ==
David Grossack was educated at Thayer Academy, Brandeis University, Babson College (where he received a B.S. in Management in 1976), and the New England School of Law, where he was awarded a Juris Doctor in 1981.

== Early political career ==
As a young law student, Grossack was influenced by the activities of Andrew Melechinsky, who was active in an organization known as Constitutional Revival. Constitutional Revival stood for the proposition that the federal constitution is the blueprint for a laissez faire, private enterprise society in which the role of government is limited, and that courts are in error for not taking measures to limit the excesses of administrative agencies, zoning boards, and similar bodies. The organization had several confrontations over property rights and building inspections. Grossack acted as stand-by counsel for Melechinsky on several occasions. Grossack, at the age of 25, represented a member of Constitutional Revival in an action to quash an Internal Revenue Service third party summons by using discovery pleadings.

== Career ==
Grossack soon had another opportunity to stand up for constitutional rights. When Israeli Knesset member and Jewish Defense League founder Rabbi Meir Kahane came to speak at a local high school in Brookline, Massachusetts, the town requested that his local supporters post a "security bond" to cover expenses resulting from the anticipated confrontation with opponents. Grossack made news by threatening the town of Brookline with a lawsuit for violating Kahane's First Amendment rights. Brookline backed down, and Kahane spoke at the High School.

Grossack was active in advocating the free emigration of Jews from the former Soviet Union, Ethiopia and Arab countries.

In 1985, Grossack was named Professor of Civil Procedure at the Commonwealth School of Law, which has since been absorbed by the Massachusetts School of Law.

=== Authorship ===
In 1998, Grossack authored a book entitled How To Win A Lawsuit Without Hiring A Lawyer, which explained in great detail many of the aspects of legal self-representation., especially in civil rights cases.

Shortly thereafter, he wrote another book entitled Radical Planet, in which he advocated a number of social and economic changes in the United States and internationally, including the introduction of a new currency he invented called Universal Trade Hours, based on the value of time and labor. The book also fully details the methods by which activists can advance their causes, and puts forth the hypothesis that there are advantages to one's emotional well-being through pursuing activism.

=== Massachusetts legislature ===
In 1998, the Massachusetts legislature began an investigation of the situation of unrepresented parties in Massachusetts courts. Grossack arranged for local legislators to introduce a bill into the Massachusetts House of Representatives to establish reading rooms and web sites for the instruction of pro se litigants in the state's court houses. Shortly thereafter, the Suffolk County Probate and Family Court in Boston established the first of such reading rooms.

=== International news ===
Grossack made international news the same year. His Citizens Justice Institute brought exorcist Baron Deacon to Washington, D.C. to "cleanse demons from Congress." [6] The exorcist performed a ritual on the steps of Capitol Hill in front of tourists, reporters, TV cameras and other onlookers. The event made headlines in several countries and was picked up on television and wire services.

=== Fatherhood Coalition ===
The following year, Grossack was hired by the Fatherhood Coalition to challenge the treatment of males in the Massachusetts court system, most particularly with regard to domestic relations matters. Grossack, on behalf of his clients, charged that the courts violated men's rights by removing them from their homes without a hearing on flimsy allegations of spousal abuse. Grossack's civil rights suit also alleged that property, alimony and custody decisions were usually biased against men. The lawsuit gathered significant publicity, though it was ultimately unsuccessful. [2]

=== Rabbinical Court Case ===
In March 2008, Grossack instituted a complaint with the Vaad HaRabonim, a Massachusetts Jewish ecclesiastical court, against a foreclosure law firm, based on violations of Talmudic law concerning oppression of the poor. Grossack sought excommunication of the lawyers involved.

The firm was seeking to evict an elderly couple in Rockland, Massachusetts who had a mortgage at 16% that had been assumed by Fannie Mae.

Grossack's concern in the situation was motivated in large part by objections he had to usury. He followed up his complaint with information that the actions of the foreclosure lawyer Mark Harmon led to the suicide of a woman in New Bedford, but nevertheless the Vaad took no action.

=== Experimental global currency ===
In 1996, Grossack invented an experimental global currency known as the Universal Trade Hour, a currency based on time and labor. He found a warm reception with Terra Libra, a libertarian think tank based in Colorado, who assisted him in publicizing and promoting the currency.

Currently, Universal Trade Hours are not in circulation, but Grossack has been seeking to influence NGOs in less developed countries to consider experimenting with the concept.
