= Roxbury Memorial High School =

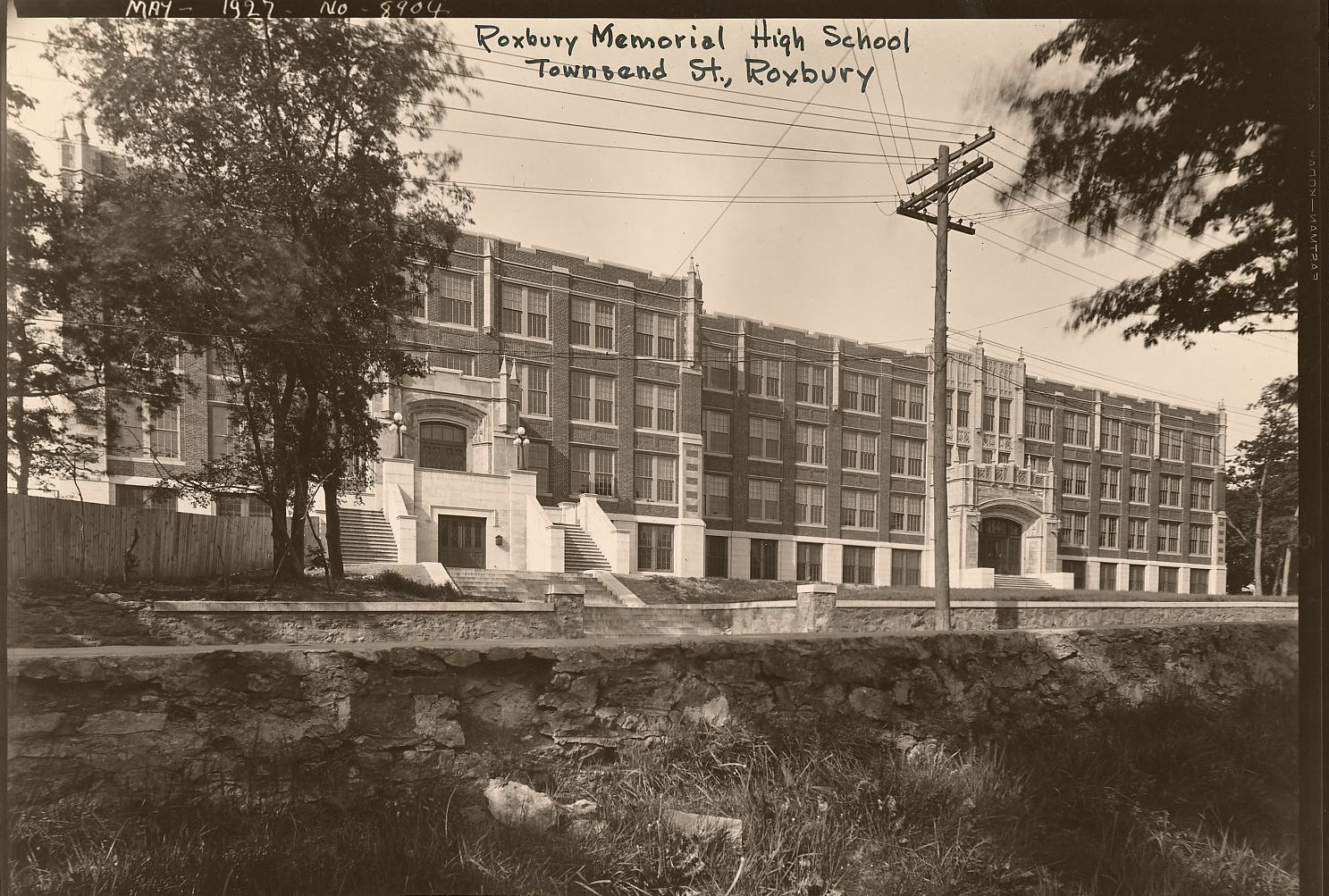
- External view of the high school, circa May 1927

Location
- 205 Townsend Street; Roxbury, Massachusetts; United States
- Coordinates: 42.3161°N 71.0845°W

Information
- Type: Public high school
- Established: 1926
- Closed: 1960
- Girls Headmaster: Winifred H. Nash (1956)
- Boys Headmaster: Paul B. Crudden (1956)
- Faculty: Girls • 51 (1956); Boys • 46 (1956)
- Enrollment: Girls • 2,972 (1933); Boys • 1,700 (1933)
- Colors: Green and Gold
- Yearbook: Laurel (Girls); Bostonian (Boys)

Roxbury Memorial High School is a defunct four-year public high school serving students in ninth through twelfth grades. Originally founded as Roxbury High School, the school was situated at 205 Townsend Street, in the Roxbury neighborhood of Boston, Massachusetts, United States from 1926 until its closure in 1960.

== History ==
Roxbury High School (for boys) was established in 1852, in what was then the independent City of Roxbury, Massachusetts on Kenilworth Street. In 1854, Roxbury High School for Girls opened, and in 1861, both schools were united into a single co-educational school. The City of Roxbury was annexed by the City of Boston in 1868, and the administration of Roxbury High School was assumed by Boston Public Schools. In order to "abolish coeducation and the elective system in all high schools", in 1911 the school committee voted to make the Roxbury High School exclusive to girls.

In 1926, the school moved from its second home on Warren and Montrose Streets (thereafter housing the Boston Clerical School) to a new building on Townsend Street and became known as the Memorial High School. Prior to being erected, the Townsend Street building had been named as such in 1925 by members of the Boston School Committee "in commemoration of the Boston schoolmen who lost their lives during the World War". The school building was built in two phases, a girls' portion completed with classes started for the 1926-27 school year, and a boys' half completed with classes started in September, 1928. The two halves were treated as separate institutions, Memorial High School for Boys and Memorial High School for Girls, both with its own headmasters and set of teachers. The school was the first in the City of Boston to feature a swimming pool. Prior to the 1929 school year, the name of the school was changed to the Roxbury Memorial High School. The Warren Branch of the Boston Public Library (BPL) moved to the building in 1926 and was renamed the Memorial Branch. In December 1970, the branch relocated to the corner of Warren and Crawford Streets and dubbed the Grove Hall Branch of the BPL.

The school closed in 1960. The building was later occupied by Boston Technical High School from 1960 to 1987, and since 1991 by Boston Latin Academy.

== Headmasters ==
- BOYS
  - Robert B. Masterson (1928–1953)
  - Paul B. Crudden^{†} (1953–1960)
- GIRLS
  - Myrtle C. Dickson (1926–1947). First woman headmaster appointed in Boston Public Schools.
  - Winifred H. Nash (1947–1957)

^{†} Headmaster for both Boys and Girls schools, 1957–1960.

== Notable alumni ==
- Sheldon Adelson, business magnate, investor, and philanthropist
- Arthur Asa Berger, academic
- Jason Berger, painter
- John F. Collins, Mayor of Boston
- Sherm Feller, Boston Red Sox public address announcer
- The G-Clefs, doo-wop/R&B vocal group
- Larry Glick, talk radio host
- Martin Grossack, psychologist
- Jerry Korn, Boston Globe reporter and author
- Jack Landrón, popular folksinger (as Jackie Washington) and actor.
- Elma Lewis, founder of the National Center of Afro-American Artists and the Elma Lewis School of Fine Arts
- Carl McCall, politician
- Albert "Dapper" O'Neil politician
- Eddie Pellagrini, Major League Baseball infielder and baseball coach at Boston College.
- Fred Richmond, politician
- Flo Steinberg, publisher
- John Woodrow Wilson, artist
