= Michael L. Coyne =

American lawyer

- Born: Michael L. Coyne; Dorchester, Boston, Massachusetts, U.S.
- Education: Boston Latin School, Boston State College, and Suffolk University Law School
- Occupations: Dean and professor at Massachusetts School of Law
- Known for: Legal education in the United States
- Website: www.mslaw.edu/mcoyne

Michael L. Coyne is Massachusetts School of Law's (MSLAW) dean, as well as a professor of law. He teaches civil procedure and conflict resolution, evidence, case preparation and strategy, and remedies. He is a graduate of Boston Latin School, Boston State College, and Suffolk University Law School. He practiced law in Boston representing clients in civil litigation matters in state and federal courts. He was one of the attorneys who represented plaintiffs in the sexual abuse scandal in the Catholic archdiocese of Boston.

He has been a trial attorney for many years and specializes in complex litigation. He is the author of the electronic casebook Modern Procedural Remedies, has written many articles for publication, has lectured for a national bar review company, and serves as associate producer of MSLAW's television shows.
