= Karl von Rydingsvärd =

Swedish-American furniture maker and teacher

Karl Arthur von Rydingsvärd
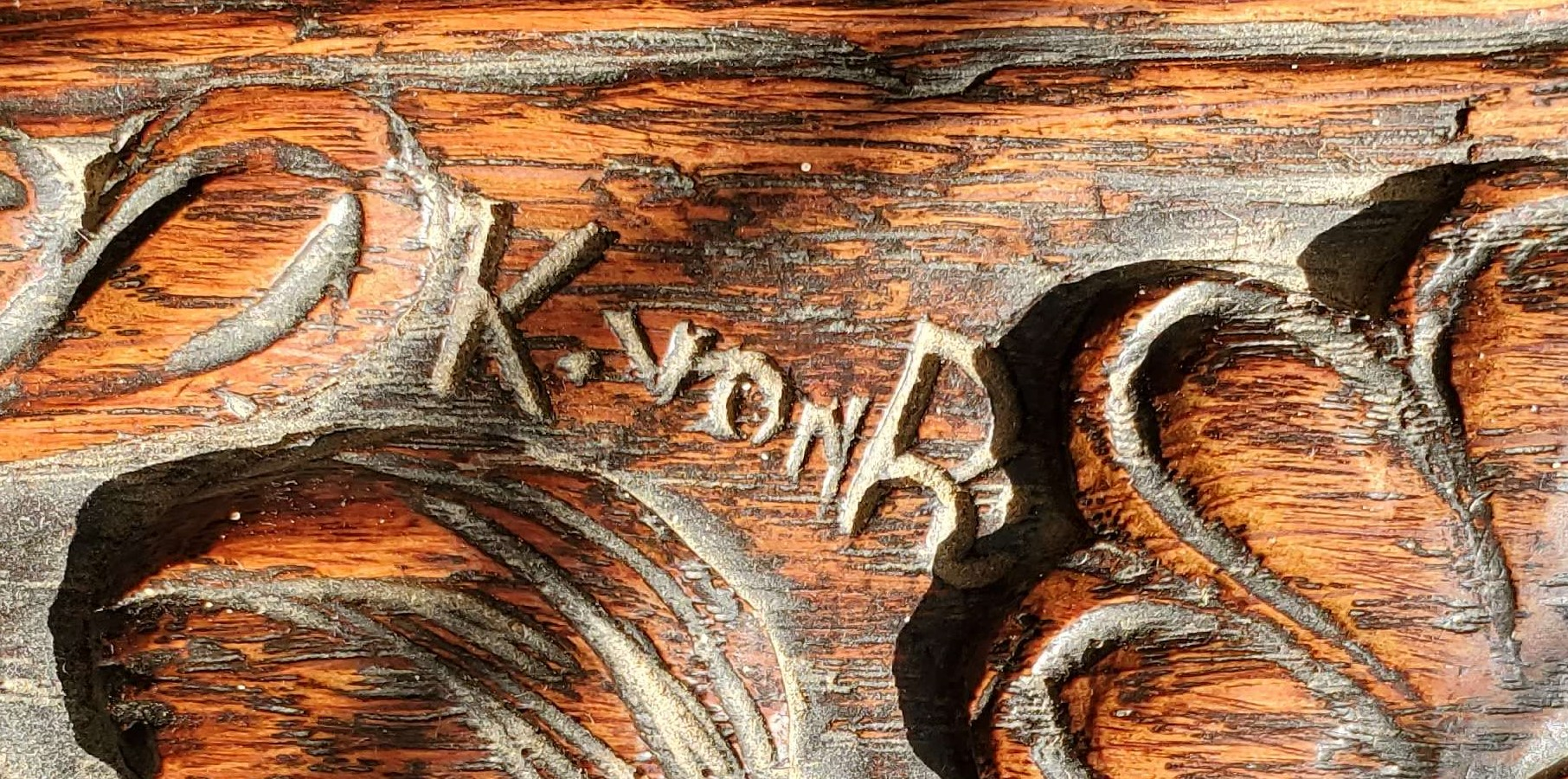
- von Rydingsvärd often carved his signature in pieces as K. von R.
- Born: November 22, 1863; Färgelanda, Dalsland, Sweden
- Died: May 2, 1941 (aged 77); Portland, Maine, United States
- Occupations: Furniture maker, teacher
- Years active: 1883–1941
- Style: Arts and Crafts
- Spouses: Anna M. Davis (m. 1886; div. 1897) Ida W. (Simpson) Jackson (m. 1898)

Signature
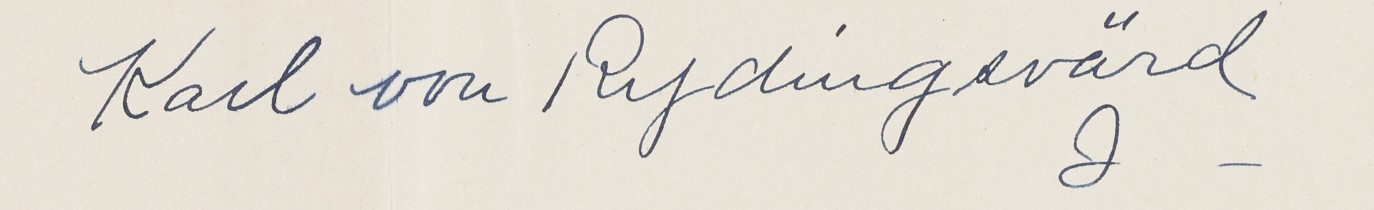

Karl Arthur von Rydingsvärd was a Swedish-American furniture maker and teacher influential in the Arts and Crafts movement in the United States.

His work was exhibited at the Louisiana Purchase Exhibition, and he was a prominent member of arts societies in the 1890s–1930s, exhibiting around New York and greater New England. His furniture and architectural work furnished the homes and businesses of upper class society of the time, including Arthur Curtiss James, Amanda Brewster Sewell, Theodore Swann, and Douglas Volk.

Rydingsvärd's greatest influence may be his work as a teacher, as he spent most of his career as an educator. Notably, his classes were open to women, and he had a direct influence on future generations of craftsmen due to his work training future teachers of technical arts at the Teachers College in New York and future generations of artists at the Rhode Island School of Design.

== Personal life ==
Rydingsvärd was born in Sweden on November 22, 1863 to Axel and Emma Rydingsvärd. He records on his census that he received up to an eighth grade formal education. He learned to carve furniture at the Royal Technical School in Sweden before emigrating to the United States in 1883.

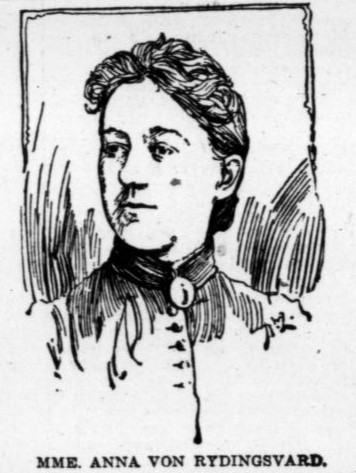
Anna von Rydingsvärd

In April 1886, Rydingsvärd married the Boston-born Anna M. Davis. Anna taught as a professor in the Massachusetts Normal Art School in Boston, and was an accomplished translator and author, who wrote magazine articles and a manual for art education in schools, as well as translating from Swedish several books including My Lady Legend by Albrekt Segerstedt in 1891, and Vera Vorontzoff by Sonja Kovalevsky in 1895. (She is also credited with translating Verner von Heidenstam's Endymion and Tor Hedberg's Judas, but there is no evidence that these translations were ever published.)

During the course of their marriage, the couple referred to themselves as members of the Swedish nobility, despite Rydingsvärd having no prominent noble descent, a fact that was reported in Boston area Swedish-language newspapers. Anna referred to herself as Baroness von Proschwitz in her translation work, and gave interviews claiming the title. When Anna filed for divorce in 1897, the false claims of nobility were exposed by the English-language press, including the New York Times.

In 1899, Rydingsvärd married his former student, Ida Jackson. Ida was also a proficient woodcarver who occasionally exhibited her work with his.

Rydingsvärd became a naturalized citizen of the United States on December 24, 1900. Despite the false claims of nobility coming to light in the 1890s, Rydingsvärd continued to introduce himself as a member of the nobility at least into the 1920s, as papers from the collection of Douglas Volk, a fellow artist whose family Rydingsvärd worked closely with, introduce him as "Count von Rydingsvärd", and newspapers of the 1910s introduce him with the title of Baron.

He was friends with many other notable artists of the period, including Amanda Brewster Sewell, who painted his portrait in 1905.

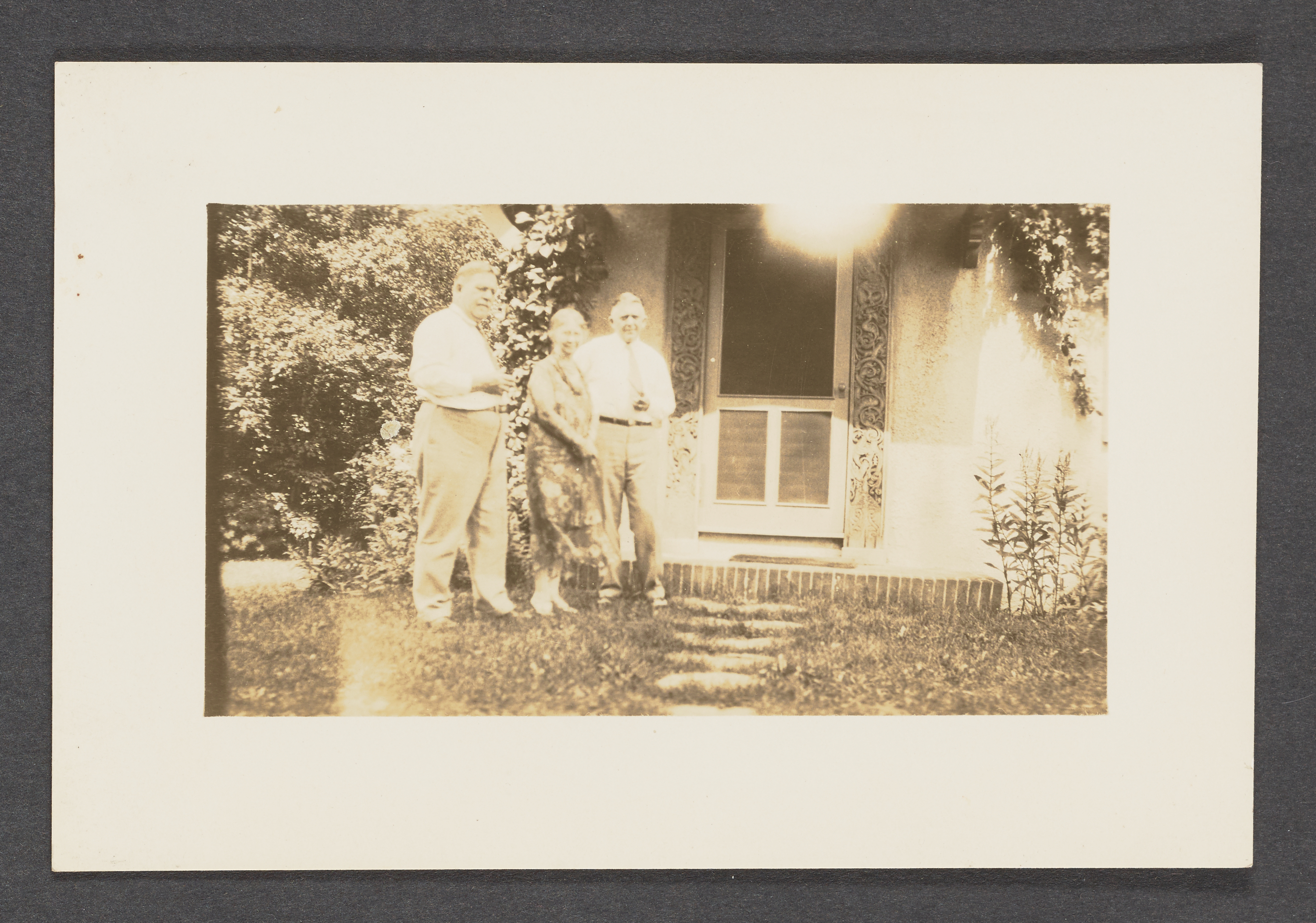
Karl and Ida von Rydingsvärd, with Wendell Volk, standing in front of the 85 Clinton St. house in Portland, ME. The house was purchased in 1925. The label on the backside of this photograph, which comes from the Douglas Volk papers, describes Rydingsvärd as a count. Note the carved panels surrounding the door.

Rydingsvärd died on May 2, 1941. His wife Ida died only nineteen days later, on May 21. They are buried together in Evergreen Cemetery in Portland, Maine.

== Career ==
Rydingsvärd was an active contributor to many craft-focused periodicals, writing tutorials and publishing decorative designs intended to be copied by amateur woodcarvers. He provided a multi-part series, "Lessons in Woodcarving", in the Arts & Crafts magazine (London, published by Hutchinson and Co.), as well as publishing in Art Amateur, International Studio, and The Craftsman.

In addition to producing his own work, Rydingsvärd ran a school for woodcarving for many years, taking both men and women as pupils and coordinating exhibits of their work. Prior to 1891, Rydingsvärd taught at the Boston Normal School.

From 1891 to 1896, Rydingsvärd taught at the Rhode Island School of Design.

In 1896 in Boston, he organized an exhibition focused on the work of women artists. He was a major proponent of women's work in woodcarving, and often spoke about their ability to carve both as a hobby and as a profession.

In 1895, he was a department director in the Manual Training and Arts Education department at the Horace Mann School of the Teachers College in New York and taught woodcarving at their Macy Manual Training High School for girls.

In 1897, in an unusual departure from his work in furniture design and woodcarving, he exhibited at the Boston Society of Arts and Crafts as a book designer, representing Lamson, Wolffe, and Company. This was the same publisher with which his wife Anna published her translation of Vera Vorontzoff. The cover design and title page illustration for that book are uncredited and unsigned, so it is not known if this was an artistic collaboration between himself and his wife.

After 1903, he was a member of the Architectural League of New York and showed work there.

In 1904, the Louisiana Purchase Exposition, for the first time in the history of world's fairs, separated displays of machine-made furniture and goods from handmade goods, called "original products of Art workmanship." These were exhibited along with other fine arts in the Palace of Art, rather than the Palaces of Manufactures or Varied Industries as they would have been in previous years. This recognition of handicraft was a major victory for the design reform movement, of which he Rydingsvärd was part. He exhibited at the Exposition for the state of New York, submitting a Norse style bridal chair.

In 1905, Rydingsvärd taught wood carving at the Manchester Institute of Arts and Sciences in Manchester, New Hampshire, as well as at the New York City YWCA. In 1909, he taught at the Troy School of Arts and Crafts in Troy, New York.

He exhibited his work many times at the National Arts Club where he was a member, He won a life membership as a prize in the 1914 Society of Craftsmen exhibition. In 1908, he exhibited a desk and other smaller articles (his wife Ida also exhibited at this time); his 1909 exhibition comprised seven pieces, including a copy of a 15th century Flemish picture frame; in 1916, a table and chairs; and his 1919 exhibition featured eight sculpted wood panels with scenes of American pioneers.

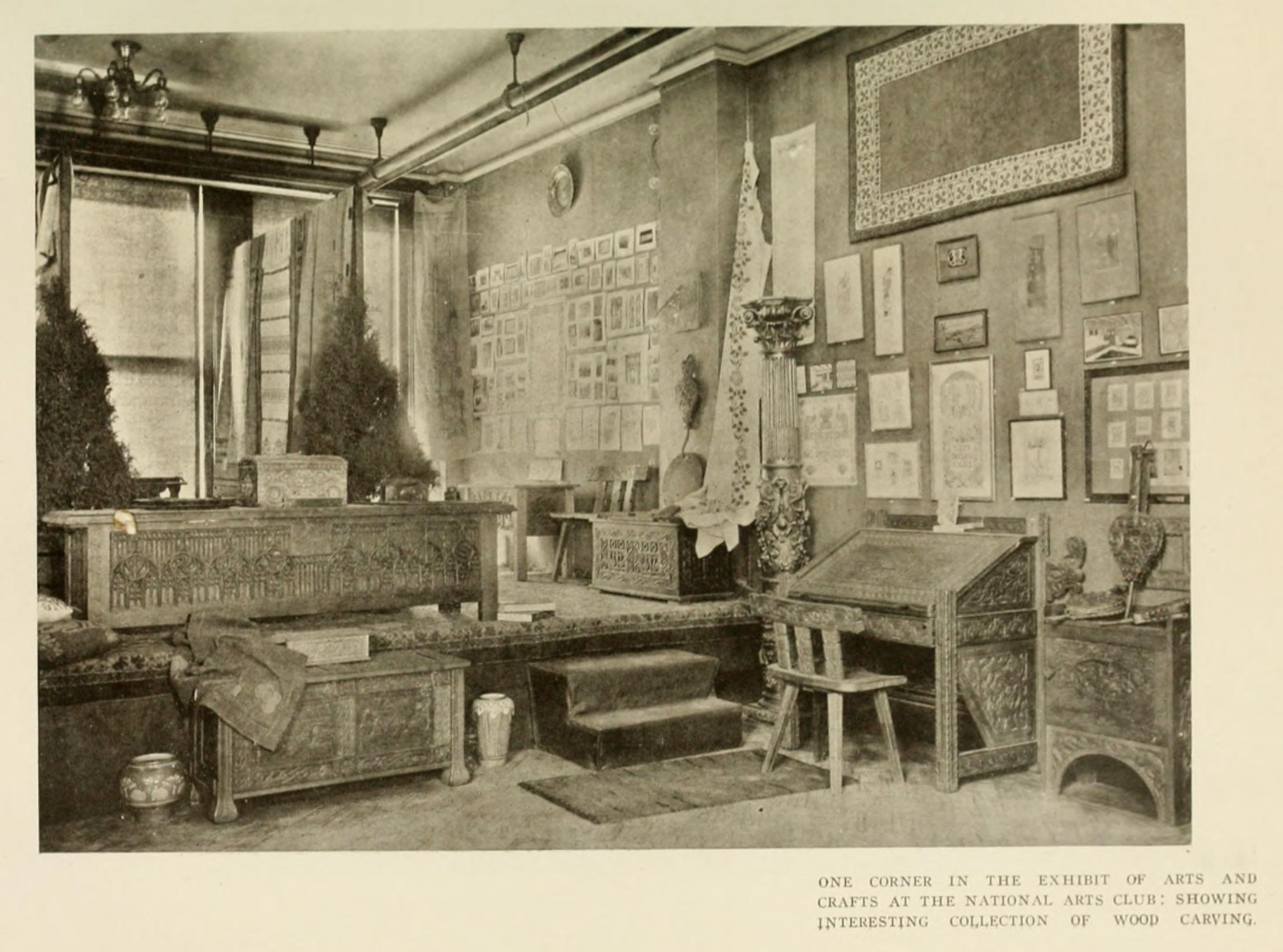
A photograph of the 1901 exhibition of the National Arts Club. The desk and chair by Karl von Rydingsvärd are seen at the right.

In 1919, Rydingsvärd was the instructor of Art Wood Carving at the Otis Art Institute in Los Angeles, California.

In 1921, Rydingsvärd served as an advisory member of the Committee of the Swedish Section of America's Making.

In 1933, he was a founding member of the Maine Architectural Society.

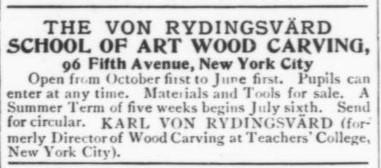
Advertisement for Rydingsvärd's wood carving school

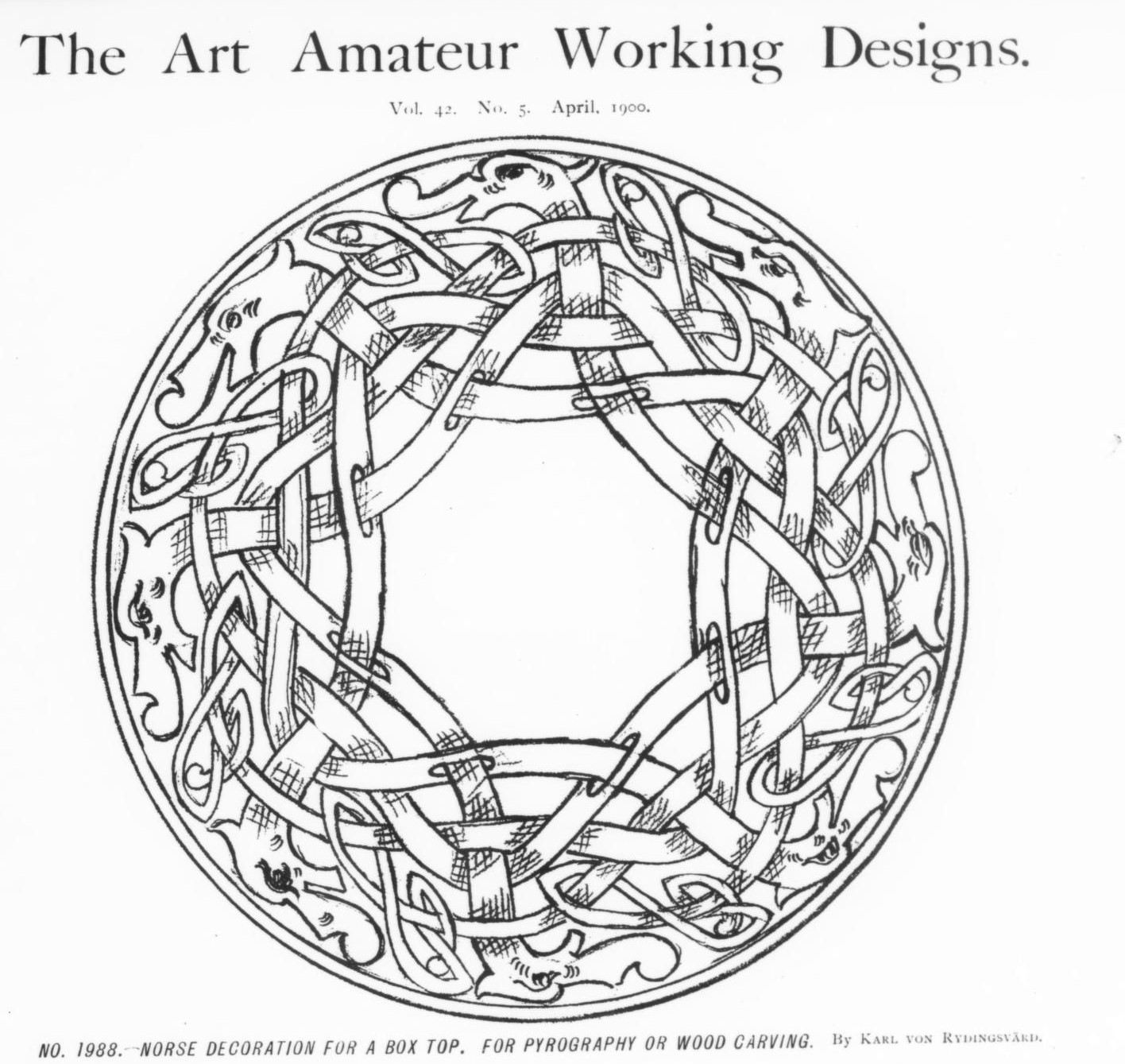
Design for a Norse decoration on a box top by Karl von Rydingsvärd

== Awards and honors ==
- 1914 – Society of Craftsmen – Eighth Annual Exhibition – First place
- 1918 – Society of Craftsmen – Board of Directors
- 1940 – World's Fair – Wall of Fame

== Artistic style ==
Rydingsvärd worked in the Arts and Crafts style, which was popular in the United States beginning in the late 1890s. His work is very influenced by Scandinavian decorations, particularly following the decorations and construction style of Scandinavian antiques. His decorative work often features Viking ships, dragons, and scenes from Norse mythology.

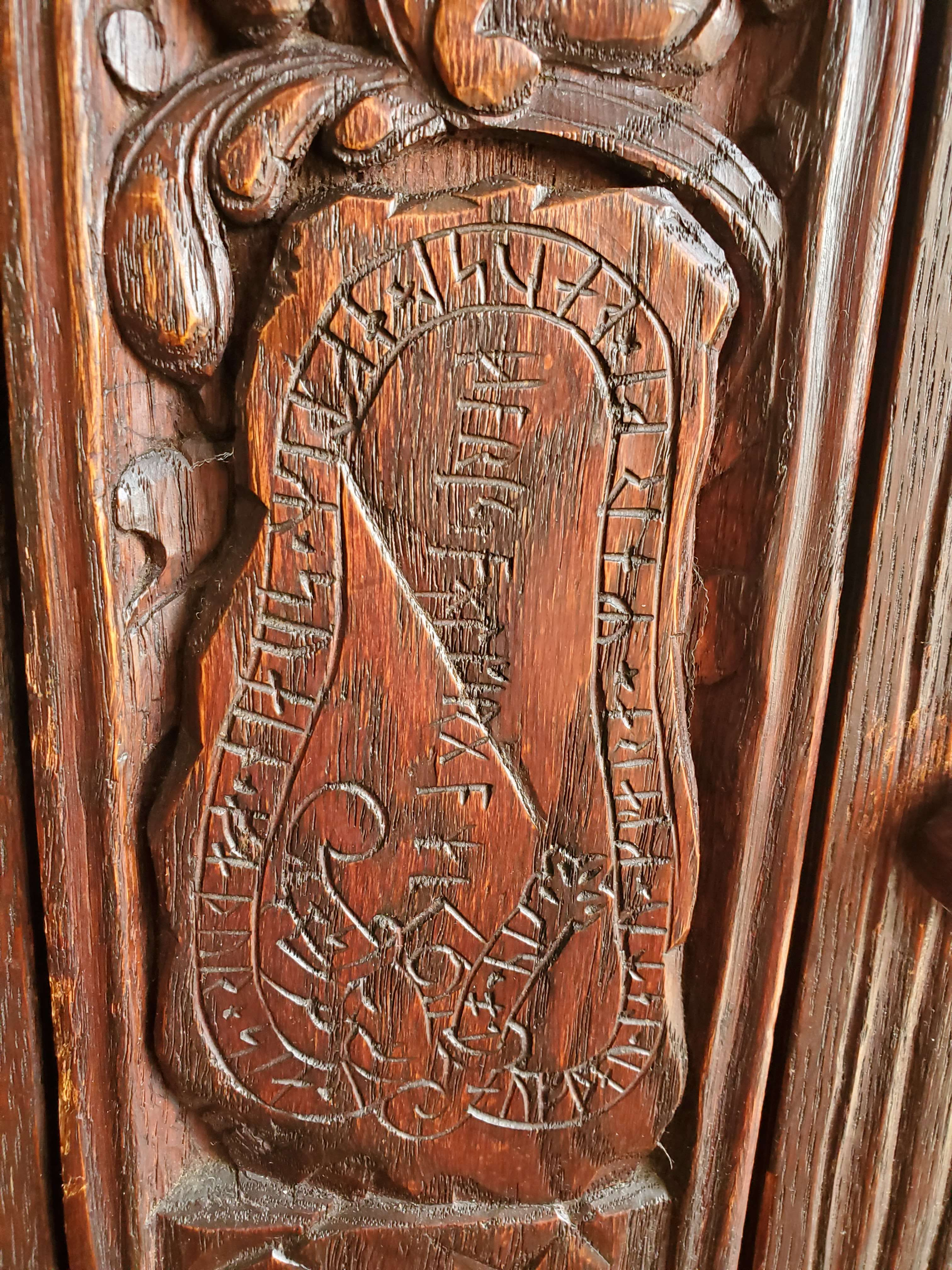
Detail view of a desk carved by Rydingsvärd (see model published in the 1909 issue of The Craftsman), showing the Skåäng Runestone in Sweden. Rydingsvärd was very influenced by the folklore of his native land.

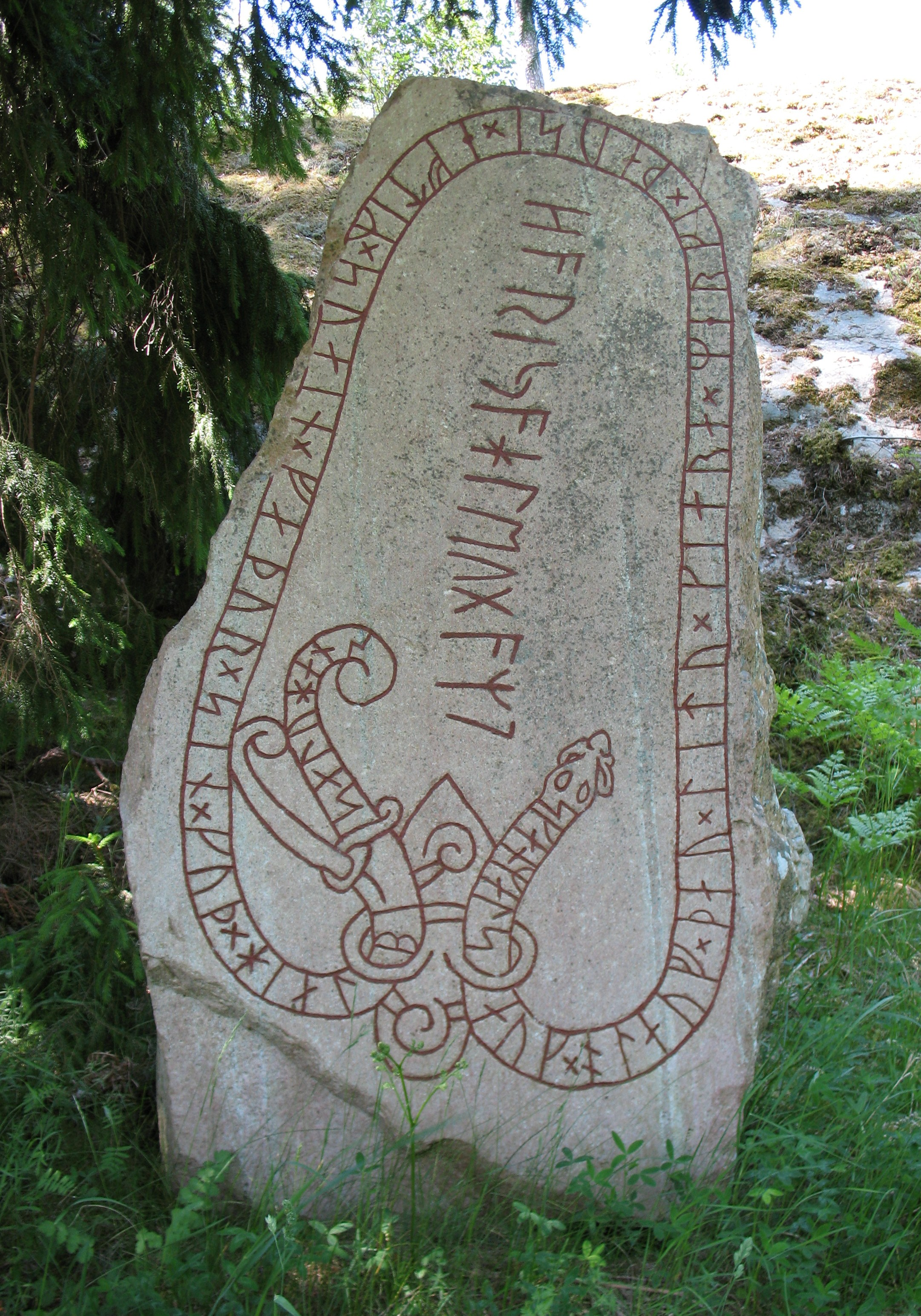
Sö 32, Skåäng

He sometimes worked in a more English Gothic style, especially when designing for clients.

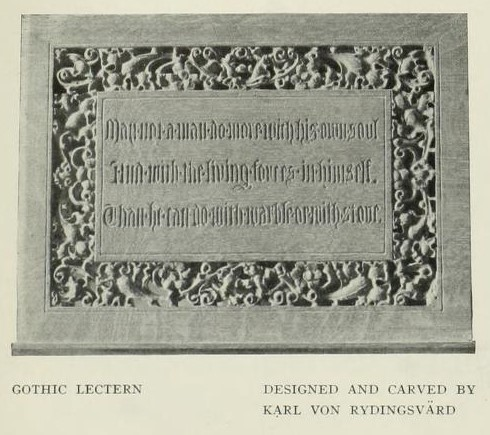
A Gothic style lectern

Like many of the Arts and Crafts style furniture makers of the period, he did not use glue or nails in the construction of his furniture, holding the pieces together primarily with heavy pegs and tenons.

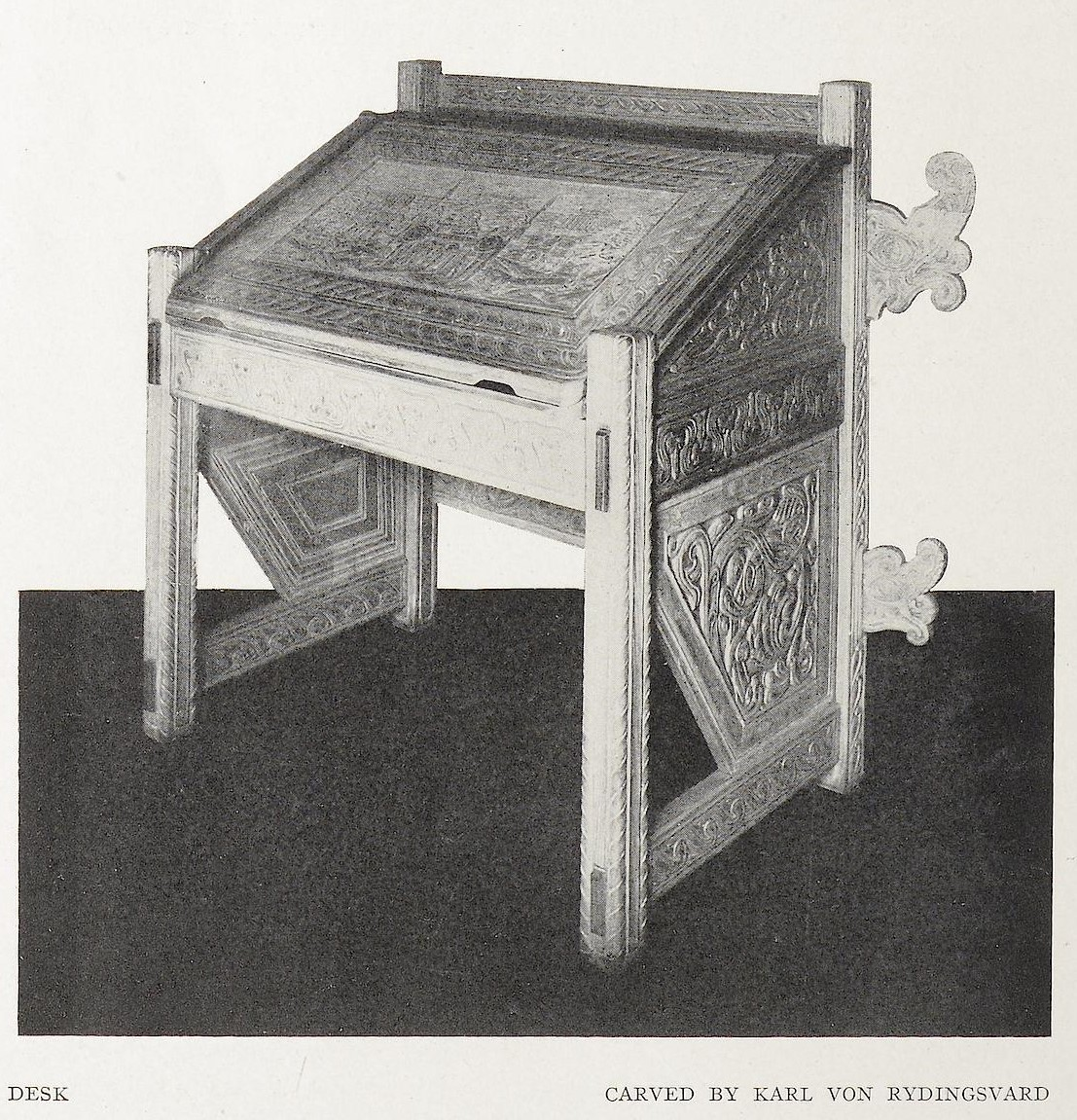
Karl von Rydingsvärd desk – International Studio Magazine – 1907

== Works ==
Throughout his life, Rydingsvärd made and sold furniture and architectural features. He often took large commissions to carve sets of furnishings for entire homes, and for friends and artistic collaborators such as Douglas Volk.

Much of Rydingsvärd's surviving work is scattered in private collections, and, aside from the 2016 exhibit at the American Swedish Historical Museum, there has been no comprehensive attempt to document it as a group. Formerly extensive collections, such as the furniture commissioned by Theodore Swann for his Birmingham, Alabama house and the furniture for Robert and Amanda Brewster Sewell's Long Island home "Fleetwood" have been broken up and sold individually.

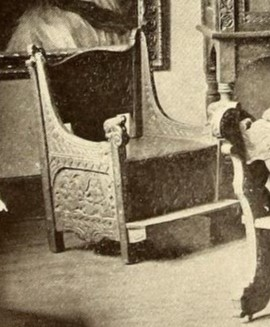
A chair from the Robert Sewell home "Fleetwood", with carved animal decorations signature to Karl von Rydingsvärd's decorative style, as featured in American Homes and Gardens.

=== Surviving work ===
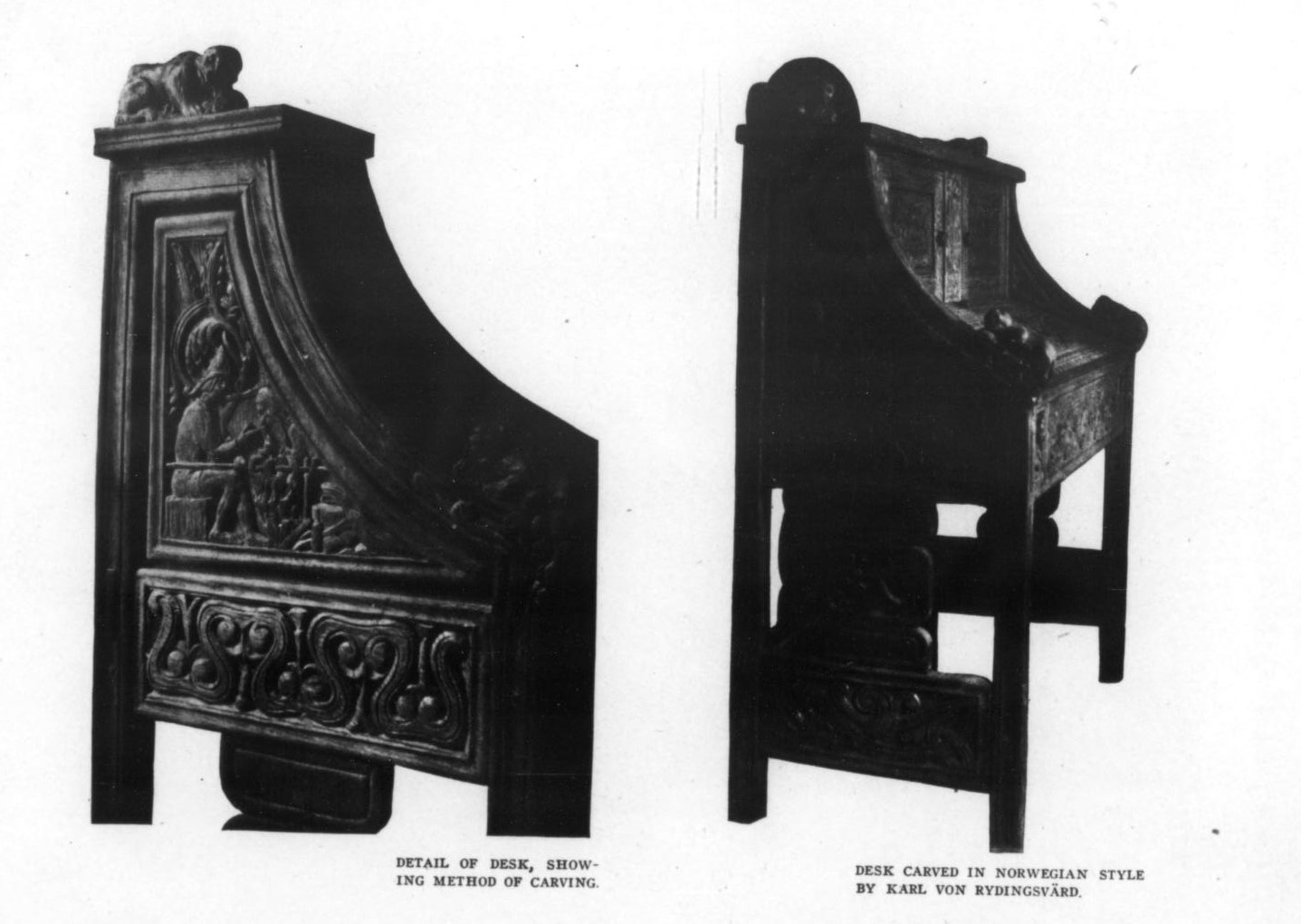
Desk carved in Norwegian style as published in a 1909 issue of The Craftsman. At least two variations of this desk exist, one as shown with the crouching lions, and another with walrus figures used aboard the Aloha, now held in the Mystic Seaport Museum.

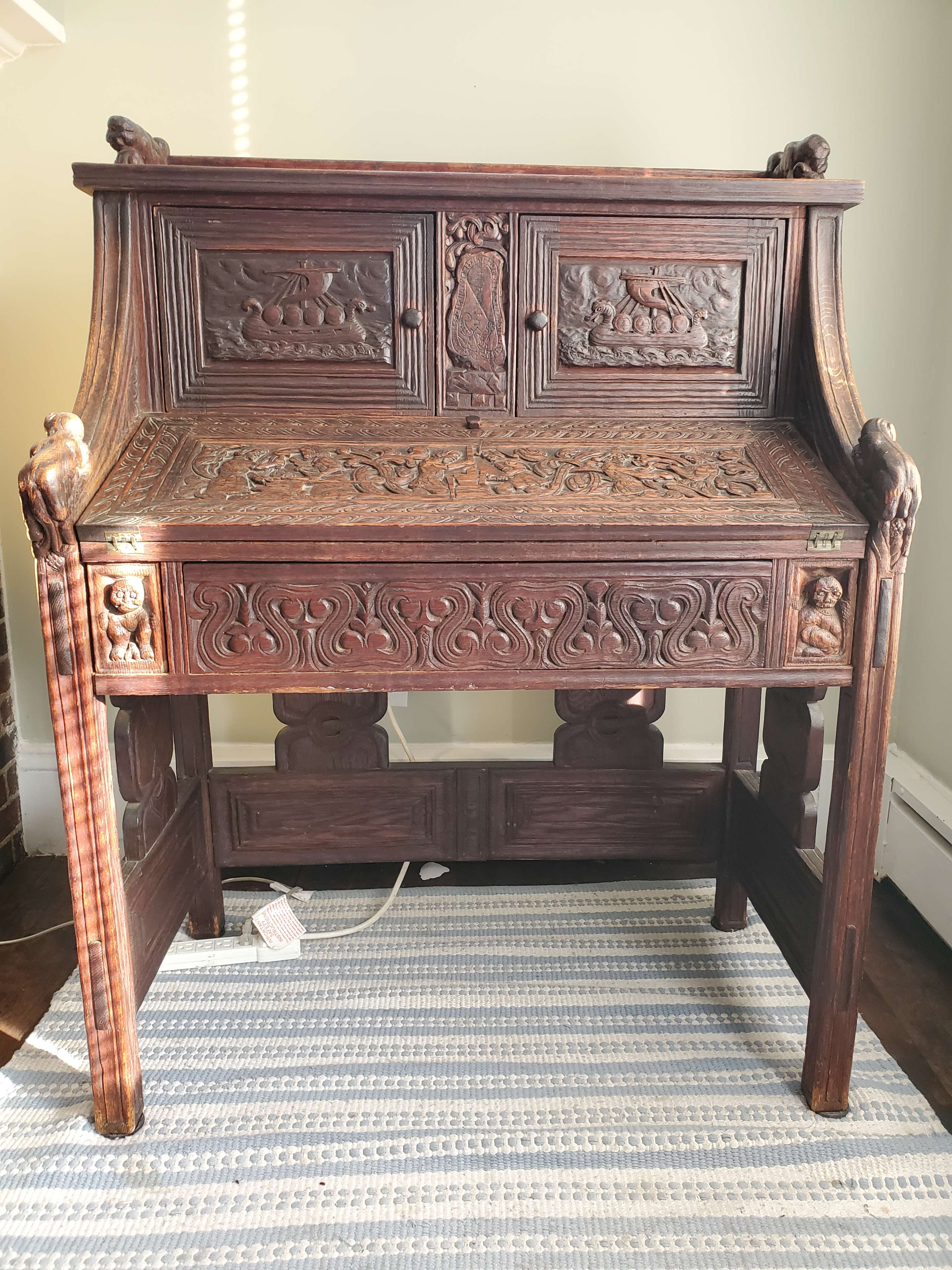
Front view of a desk by Karl von Rydingsvard (as featured in the 1909 issue of The Craftsman), held in a private collection

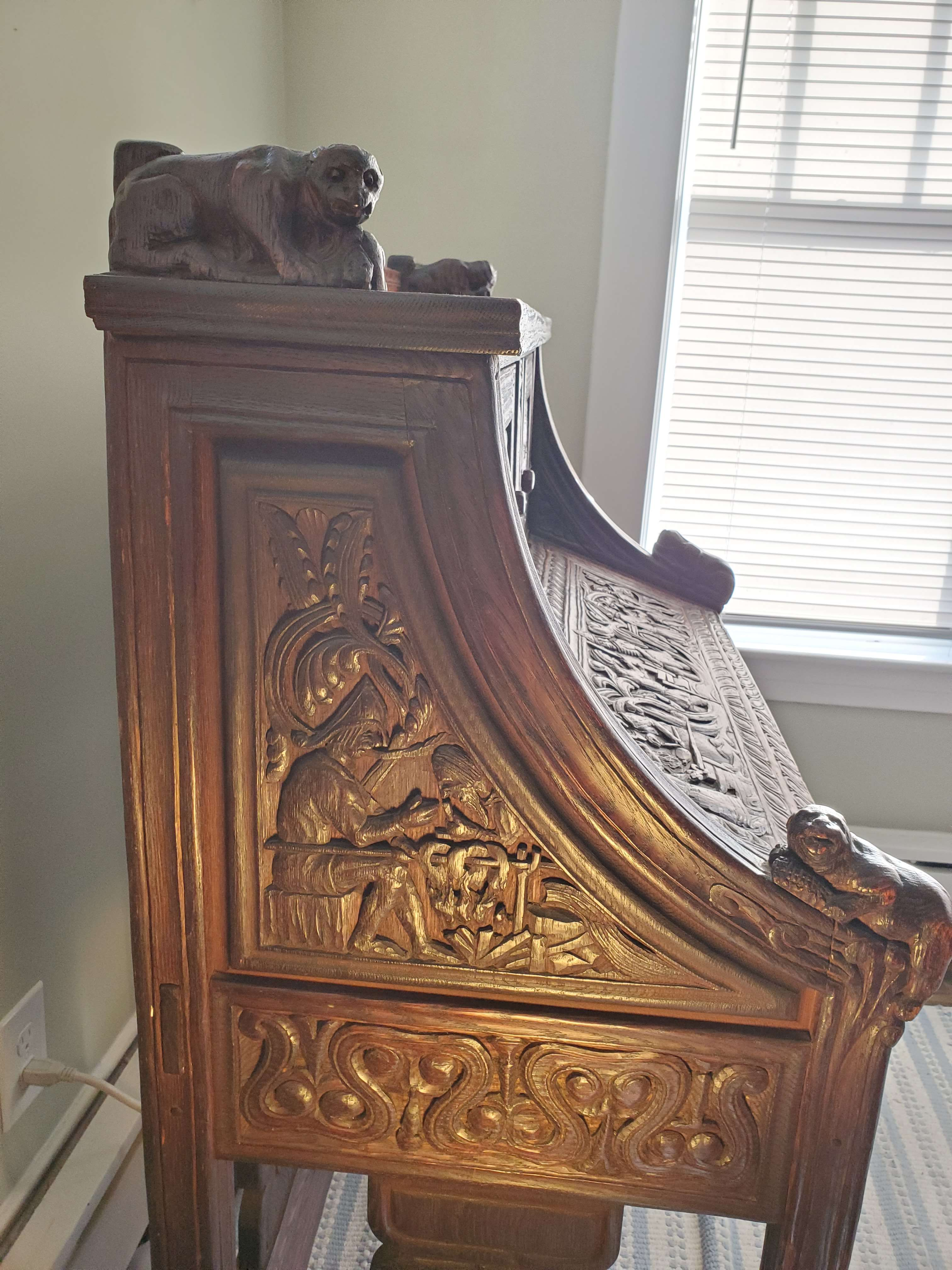
Detail view of a desk by Karl von Rydingsvard, held in a private collection

- The largest collection of Rydingsvärd's furniture is a private collection held by members of the Milliken family, who loaned their collection to the American Swedish Historical Museum for display. In 2023, the museum acquired a large bench for their permanent collection.
- The Hermitage Museum in Norfolk, Virginia contains furniture and architectural features carved by Rydingsvärd, including cabinets, an outdoor shrine, and the building's vergeboards.
- The Portland, Maine house that Rydingsvärd owned from 1925 to the end of his life maintains several visible architectural features on the exterior, including the doorframes.
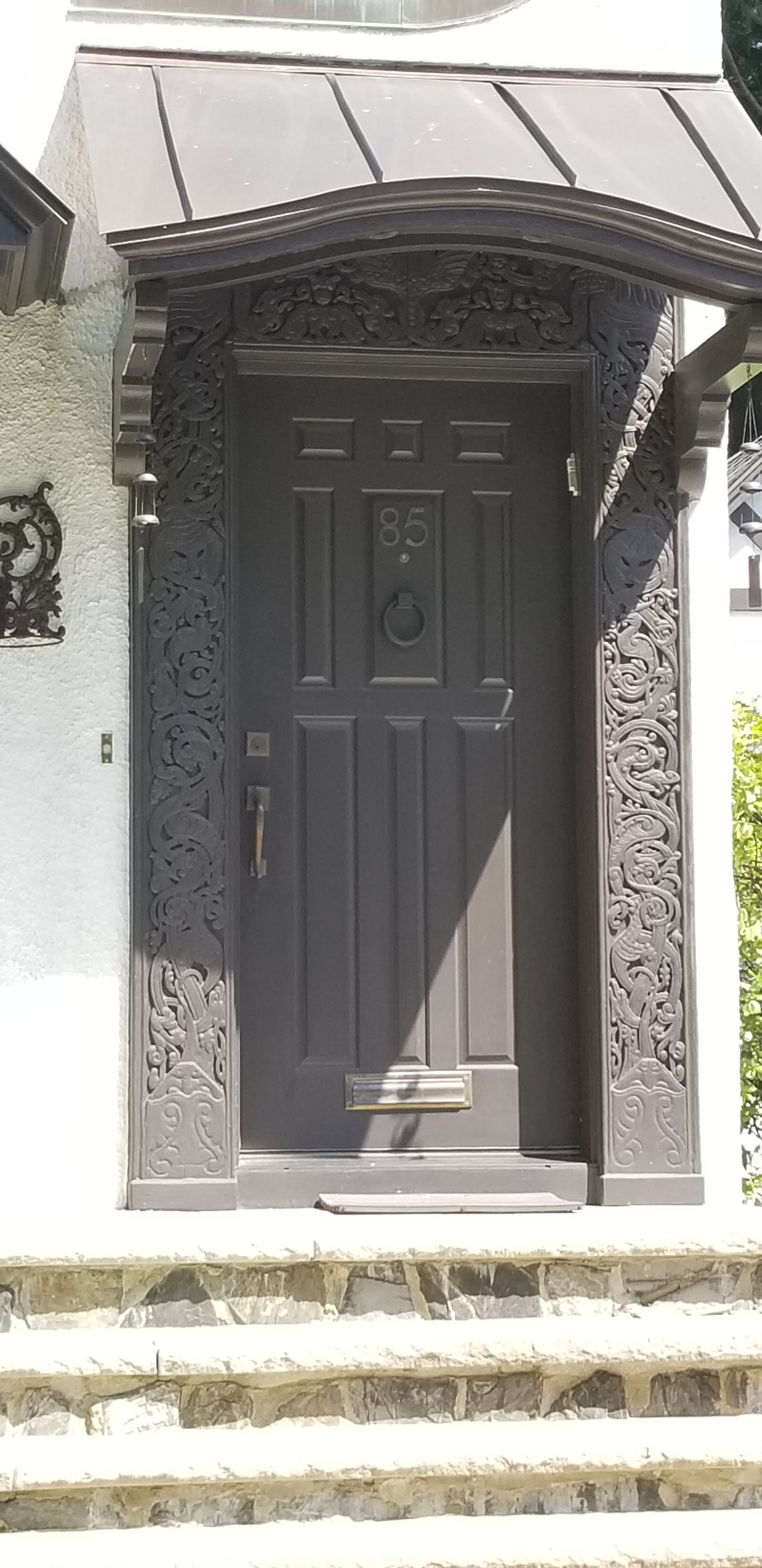
  Door carvings on Karl von Rydingsvärd's house in Portland, Maine
- Rydingsvärd completed interior carvings and decorations for Arthur Curtiss James' yacht Aloha II in 1910, depicting "the whole story of the development of water transportation" including panels of Christopher Columbus sailing to America and the Norse Volsung saga. The Aloha was scrapped in 1938 and many of its furnishings were salvaged. Some or all of the panels Rydingsvärd carved are in the permanent collection of the Mystic Seaport Museum, as is a desk with walrus figures and other furniture. These were displayed as part of the "Sea as Muse" exhibit, from September 2021 – July 2025.
- The Portland Museum of Art has a carved panel, "The History of Sea Travel", in their permanent collection.
- The former home of Douglas Volk, Hewnoaks in Center Lovell, Maine, contained furnishings and architectural features carved by Rydingsvärd. Much of the Hewnoaks collection was sold at auction in 2006, but the architectural features, including the carved support beams, remain in the house
