= Martin Grossack =

Martin Grossack (June 11, 1928 – September 28, 2000) was an American psychologist and author.

== Early life ==
Martin Grossack is the son of Albert and Rose Grossack, who were immigrants from Bobruisk, Byelorussia. Albert was 41 and Rose was 38 when Martin was born. Albert and his mother, Hannah, reportedly escaped Czarist Russia by smuggling themselves past border guards and sailing from Rotterdam, Netherlands to New York City. At age 14, Albert arrived in Boston, Massachusetts where he worked in a food and beverage wholesale distribution business. Later, he opened his own grocery and wine store in the Allston neighborhood.

Grossack attended Boston Public School and graduated from Roxbury Memorial High School. He attended Northeastern and Boston University, where he received a Doctorate in Social Psychology. In the summer of 1951, he married a psychology student from Brandeis University, Judith Trachtenberg, who was also a child of immigrants. After receiving a commission, Grossack joined the United States Air Force, entering the service as a Lieutenant and serving as a psychologist during the Korean War.

Martin and Judith had two sons: David (b. 1956), an attorney, writer, and activist before his death in 2017; and Richard (Rocky), a personal injury lawyer.

== Career ==
Grossack spent a year on the faculty of the University of Hawaii. Family ties led the Grossacks back to Boston, and they settled in the seaside resort community of Hull near Nantasket Beach.

Grossack's first book, Mental Health and Segregation, was published by Springer in New York in 1963. The book gave a picture of African-Americans prior to the Civil Rights Movement. It documented the consequences of segregation on personality, morale, school adjustment, emotional stability and problems presented to clinical practitioners. The book was well received and helped to establish his academic reputation.

Grossack taught at Boston State College and Suffolk University. He wrote You Are Not Alone, a popular self-help psychology book published by Signet in multiple editions. You Are Not Alone provided guidance for individual mental health problems in the context of what the author labelled as a "sick society." Grossack, who believed that social conditions contributed to mental health problems, was convinced that changes were needed in society to help each individual fulfill his or her potential.

Major United States American corporations became interested in Grossack's research on the psychology of advertising. Christopher Publishing House released Understanding Consumer Behavior in 1964, and Grossack became involved as a consultant with companies such as Pillsbury, Boston Edison, Gillette, Union Carbide, and multiple advertising agencies. His book Consumer Psychology For Humanized Bank Marketing was published in 1971, establishing Grossack as an authority on applied motivational research in banking. A social psychology textbook that he co-authored with Howard Gardner, Man and Men: Social Psychology as Social Science, was published by International Textbook Company, and widely used in schools.

In the late 1970s, Grossack turned his attention to the founding of a clinic known as the Institute For Rational Living which he founded in Copley Square in Boston. The IRL, as it was called, offered what Grossack called "rational self-therapy" to patients, with an emphasis on encounter and group therapies. Classes in Creative Contacts for Singles, Coping with Anxiety and Depression and Self Hypnosis made the IRL an attractive place for learning and personal growth. Moreover, the IRL broke new grounds by offering to counsel to gays and therapy to persons with transgender and sexual identity issues. Grossack's final book was Love, Sex, and Self-Fulfillment, released by Signet in 1978.

== Death ==
In his later years, Grossack spent time with his family and grandchildren. Illness struck repeatedly, and he died of cancer on September 28, 2000 at the age of 72.
