= Abbotsford (Boston, Massachusetts) =

Historic house in Massachusetts, United States

- U.S. National Register of Historic Places
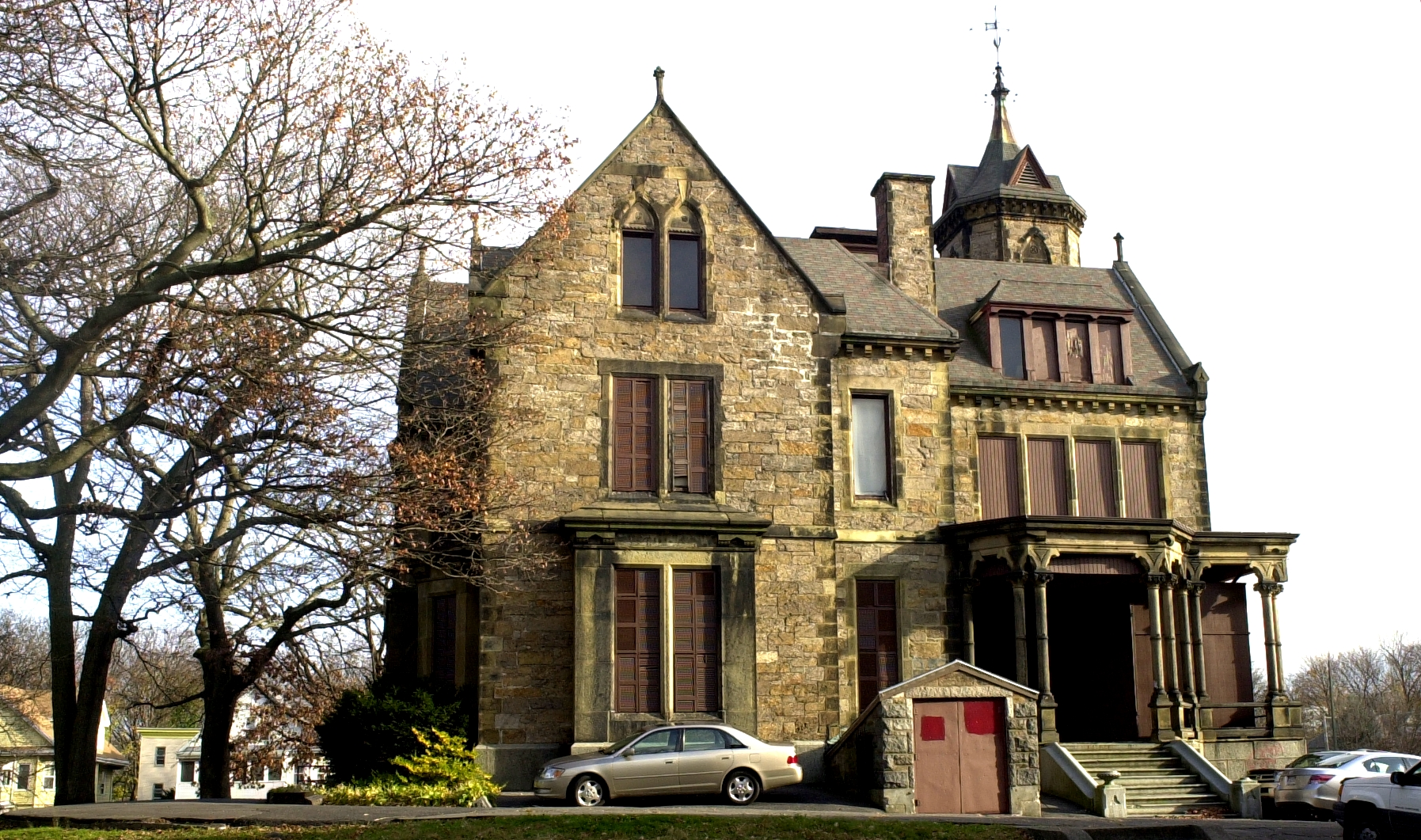

- Location within Massachusetts Location within the United States
- Location: 300 Walnut Ave., Boston, Massachusetts
- Coordinates: 42°18′58.9″N 71°5′32.5″W
- Area: 1.1 acres (0.45 ha)
- Built: 1872
- Architect: Alden Frink
- Architectural style: High Victorian Gothic
- NRHP reference No.: 87000885
- Added to NRHP: September 16, 1987

Abbotsford, now the Museum of the National Center of Afro-American Artists, is a historic house at 300 Walnut Avenue in Boston, Massachusetts, USA. The museum is dedicated to black visual arts heritage worldwide, and presents historical and contemporary exhibitions in many media, including painting, sculpture, graphics, photography and decorative arts. The museum is operated by the National Center of Afro-American Artists.

== House history ==
The pointed arches on Abbotsford's windows and main entrance are characteristics of the High Victorian Gothic style, inspired by the architecture of the Middle Ages.

Designed by Boston architect Alden Frink for the prominent industrialist Aaron Davis Williams, Abbotsford was built in 1872 in the High Victorian Gothic style. Just as the American economy was becoming industrialized, many people looked with nostalgia to times before machines and factories. Ironically, Aaron Davis Williams, Jr., used his profits from industry to build a house that could remind him of a medieval castle.

Following setbacks in his business, Williams was forced to sell Abbotsford to James M. Smith, who was born in Scotland in 1811, came to Boston in 1854, and was treasurer of the Suffolk Brewery in South Boston. Smith died at his home in Roxbury February 8, 1894.

By 1923, the mansion was too large for private use, and the City of Boston purchased it as a disciplinary school for boys. In 1976, the National Center for Afro-American Artists bought the property and turned it into a museum. This new use has made it possible for community residents to enjoy Abbotsford today.

This building is significant to Roxbury for several reasons. The most obvious is its beauty. It is a stately mansion that commands its site, and continues to be important to the community as the setting for the museum. In addition, it is built entirely of Roxbury puddingstone, a local building material. Finally, this building tells much about how people thought about their houses and their lives.

The house was added to the National Register of Historic Places in 1987.

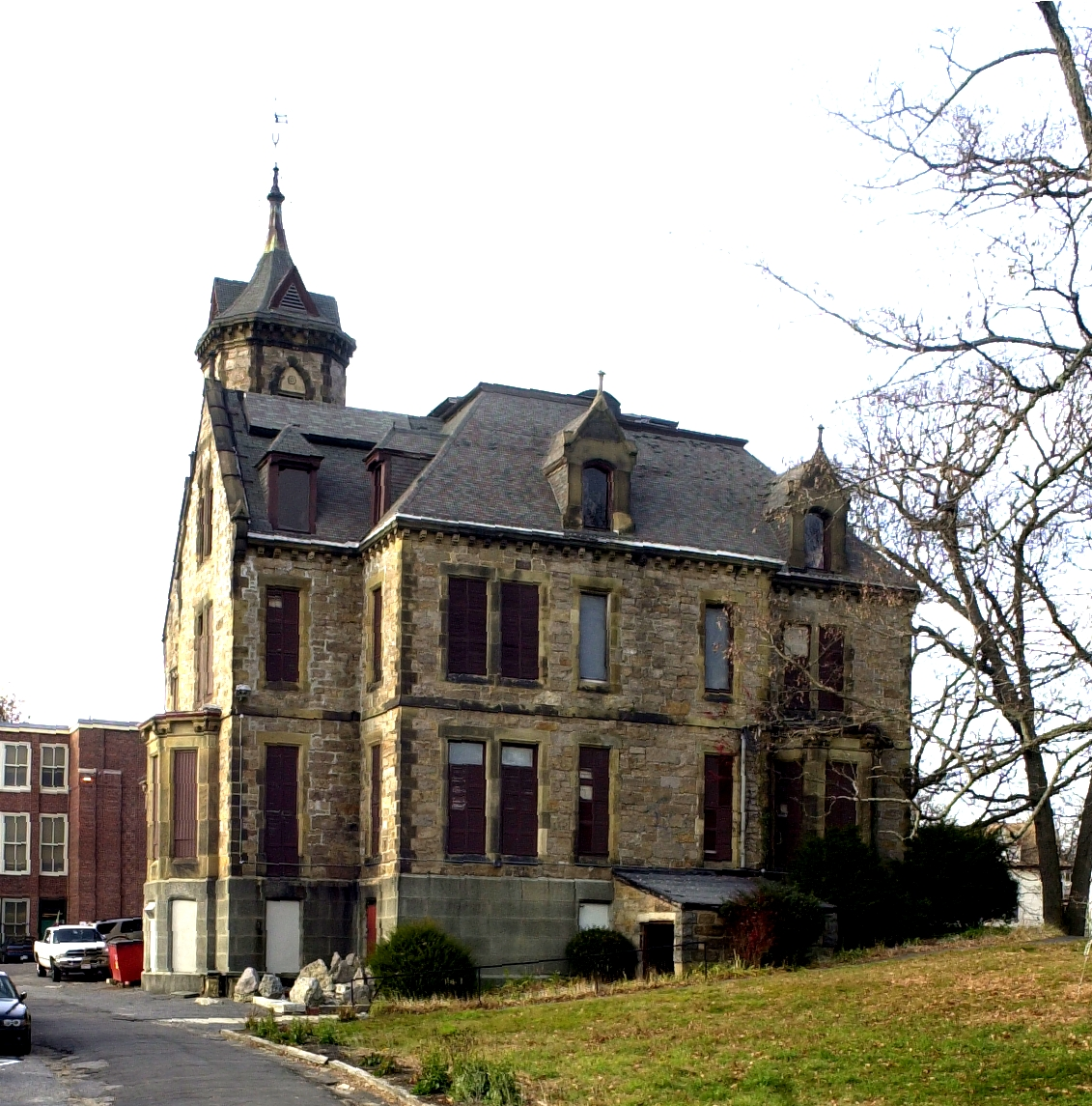

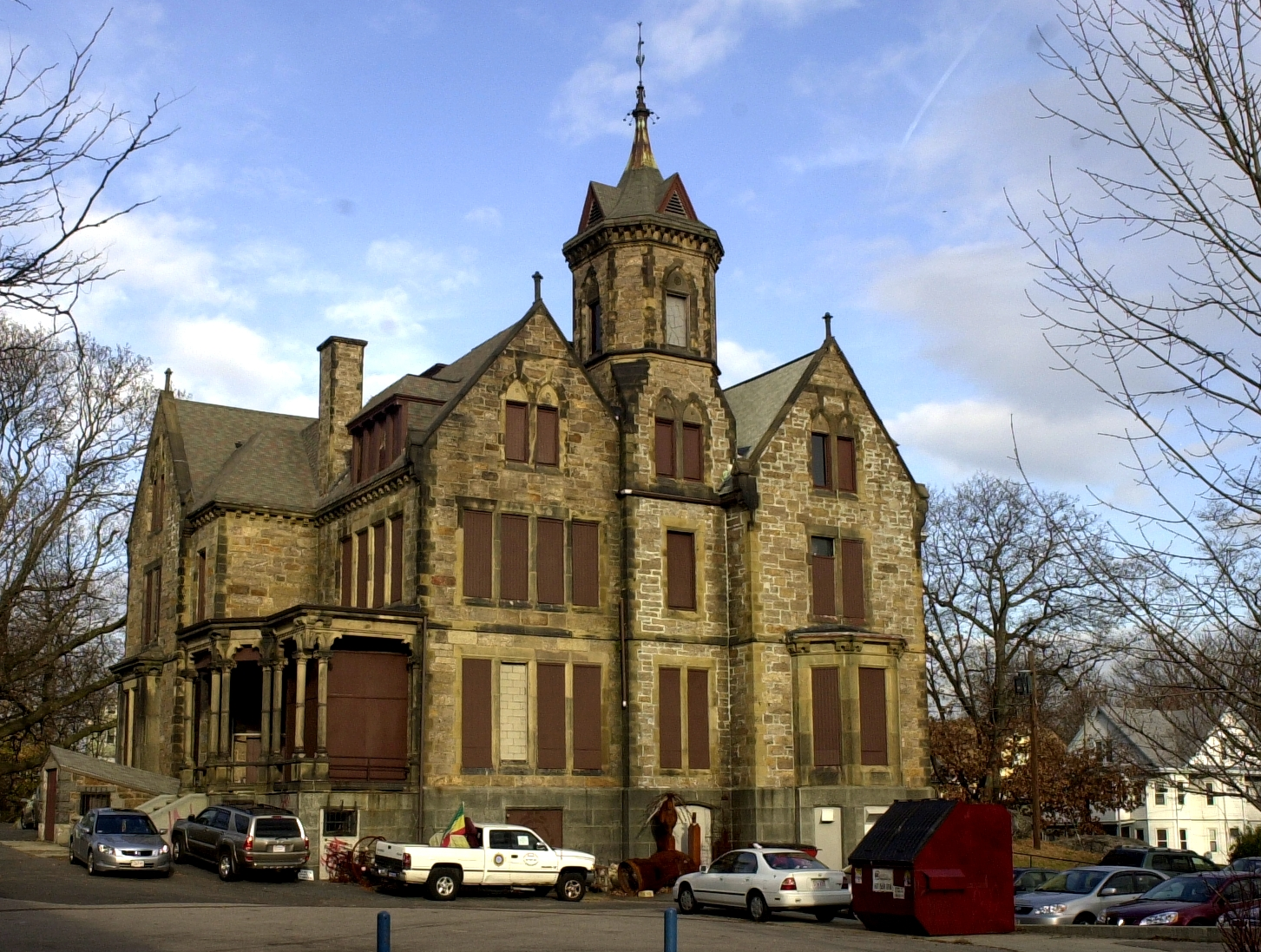

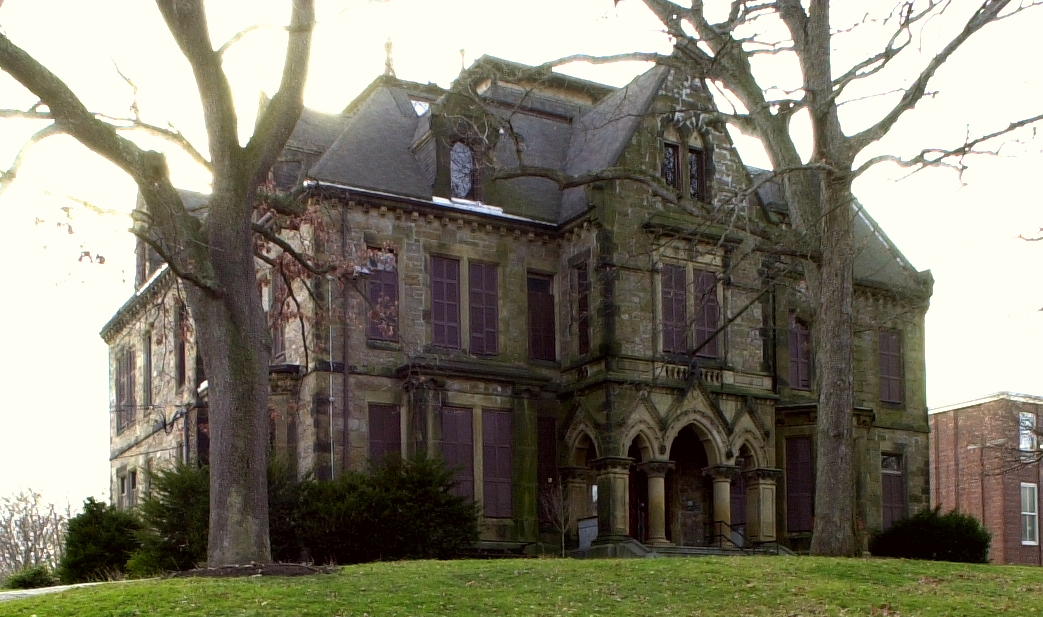

== See also ==
- National Register of Historic Places listings in southern Boston, Massachusetts
