= Elma Lewis School of Fine Arts =

Former fine arts school in Roxbury, Massachusetts

Coordinates: 42.3082°N 71.088°W

Elma Lewis School of Fine Arts (ELSFA) was founded in 1950 by Elma Lewis. The school, based in Roxbury, Boston, provided classes in a variety of artistic, social, and cultural topics, including art, dance, drama, music, and costuming. Lewis founded the school with the intention of promoting "programs of cultural enrichment for the benefit of deprived children" in Roxbury, Dorchester and throughout the Greater Boston area. The school closed at its Elm Hill Avenue location following an arson fire in 1985.

== Elma Lewis ==
Elma Ina Lewis (September 15, 1921 – January 1, 2004) was born and raised in Boston, Massachusetts. An alumna of Emerson College, Elma was a prominent American arts educator. Her work with the African-American community in the arts, as well as her dedication to social service, resulted in her being one of the first recipients of the MacArther Fellows Grant in 1981.

In 1983 she received a Presidential Medal for the Arts, the highest civilian award, from President Ronald Reagan. Elma Lewis also received 28 honorary doctorate degrees. Elma Lewis died in 2004 at the age of 82.

== Opening ==
Elma Lewis opened the Elma Lewis School of Fine Arts in 1950. Its original location was a rented 6-room apartment at 7 Waumbeck Street in Roxbury, Massachusetts. Lewis founded the school to provide African-American students and adults in the Boston area with an education in the arts.

On its first day of operation in 1950, 25 students enrolled in classes. In order to enroll, students had to pay a $5 monthly tuition.

The ELSFA was incorporated as a non-profit on October 19, 1966. At the time of incorporation, Elma Lewis was the secretary, Ruth Batson served as the chairman, and Darnley Corbin was acting treasurer. The school received its first federal grant that year.

== Location ==
By 1955, the school's attendance outgrew its rented space and the program relocated to 449 Blue Hill Avenue. Following the move, student enrollment reached 250 – ten times the size of the original class. But, located between a store and a "questionable social club," the Blue Hill space was undesirable for the long term.

In 1964, the school signed a rental contract for a building on Charlotte Street in Dorchester, Massachusetts. But after two seasons, the building was bought by a fundamentalist church. The lease was terminated and the school "was asked to move."

In 1966 the art school operated from the Lewis Junior High School. During its 1967 summer session, the school moved to the Hecht House in Boston. It was during this season that Lewis began the Playhouse in the Park Series.

The following year, the ELSFA moved to the former home of Congregation Mishkan Tefila, on the corner of Elm Hill Avenue and Seaver Street. The building was bought by the owners of the New England Hebrew Academy and they gave the property to the ELSFA. This was the only Black arts organization to have acquired property at the time. The art school eventually converted twenty rooms at the Elm Hill property, which had formerly operated as the synagogue's Hebrew school and community center; this project cost $2,000,000. That year, Lewis started the National Center of Afro-American Artists.

== National Center of Afro-American Artists ==
Elma Lewis founded the National Center of Afro-American Artists (NCAAA) in 1968 to "preserv[e] and foster[] the cultural arts heritage of black peoples worldwide through arts teaching, and the presentation of professional works in all fine arts disciplines." After its founding, the NCAAA assumed administrative responsibilities for the ELSFA and became its "intellectual dimension". The NCAAA runs a variety of cultural programs and exhibitions. In 1980 it opened the Museum of the National Center of Afro-American Artists to further its goals.

== Notable programming ==
=== Playhouse in the Park ===
In 1966, the same year that the ELSFA was incorporated as a non-profit, Elma Lewis began the Playhouse in the Park program, "a summer theater in Franklin Park", located in Boston. The program was inspired by Joseph Papp's New York Shakespeare Festival. Audiences for the nightly shows were between 100 and 3,000 people.

The program continued annually until 1977, with performances running "nightly from July 4 through Labor Day". More than 100,000 people attended shows during the first season. Throughout its run, the Playhouse often featured major celebrities, including composers and musicians Duke Ellington and Babatunde Olatunji.

The series was revived in 2002, and continues in Boston every summer. The revived program continues to feature classic arts, but "the scope of the performers has broadened to include Chinese and Irish dance, music from Brazil and the Caribbean, and ballet, hip- hop, and tap dance."

=== MCI Norfolk Prison Theatre ===
The ELSFA began the Technical Theater Training Program (TTP) at Massachusetts Correctional Institution (MCI), Norfolk, during July 1970. Over the course of ta total of 140 inmates enrolled in courses teaching drama, playwriting, music, and dance. During the early years, ten inmates collaborated and wrote a book titled Who Took the Weight: Black Voices from Norfolk Prison (1972). It was published by Little Brown & Company.

== Students and alumni ==
Between 1958 and 1963, eight former ELSFA students moved to New York and worked professionally on Broadway. In 1964 and 1965, teenaged students from ELSFA participated in the World's Fair in New York City. Four students were among the cast members for the 1969 revival of "Hello Dolly," starring Pearl Bailey. Others were cast in such Broadway productions as Ben Franklin Goes to Paris, and Golden Boy, the latter starring Sammy Davis Jr. American novelist Danzy Senna, attended the school as a child in the late 1970s.

== Operational difficulties ==
In 1966, the ELSFA was given a grant of $3,500 by the National Endowment for the Arts (NEA), to "teach art, dance, music and drama to public school children" attending Lewis Junior High School in Roxbury. The Boston School Committee voted to open the ELFSA to all Boston public school students, but the Committee's Business Agent forced the arts program to leave the Junior High school. It had no base of operations.

In 1967, while classes were not in session, the ELSFA was funded "by donations provided through the network of Elwood McKenny, the presiding justice of the Roxbury District Court." During this time, administrators held meetings to determine direction for the school, while seeking permanent housing.

In the early 1970s, the NCAAA launched a program called CELEBRATE! to raised funds for building upkeep and salaries. This fundraising continued from 1971 to 1973.

In 1971, Elma Lewis was accused by the Jewish Survival Legion of "horrendous crimes against Jewish people." (The JSL consisted of a few thousand people who had left the Jewish Defense League (JDL) in Boston and other cities, over disagreement about tactics.) She sued JSL for defamation, beginning a two-decade-long court battle. An expensive series of appeals and victories took place on each side.

In 1980, the arts school was in significant financial distress. Enrollment had plummeted, from a high of 525 students to 100. The ELSFA was "facing a sizable debt, [and] experiencing an acute staff shortage". Michael Washburn and Associates were hired to prescribe a four-year plan to the struggling institution. They determined that "the ELSFA conceptualization requires an annual budget of approximately $1 million for its optimal operation".

That year, the Kennedy Foundation gave the ELSFA a grant that offset building repair costs, for one year only.

=== Arson fires ===
The Elma Lewis School of Fine Arts was repeatedly beset by cases of arson through the 1970s and 1980s. The 1970s fires failed to do significant damage, and most of the records from this decade survived. One was attributed to a kiln that had been left on all night. But the fires in the 1980s resulted in some records being destroyed. In 1985 an especially troubling incident was a perpetrator throwing flaming materials into a classroom during a rehearsal. None of the cases were solved.
