= Samson Okunlola =

American football player (born 2004)

No. 63 – Miami Hurricanes
- Position: Offensive tackle
- Class: Redshirt Junior

Personal information
- Born: October 12, 2004 (age 22); Brockton, Massachusetts, U.S.
- Listed height: 6 ft 6 in (1.98 m)
- Listed weight: 330 lb (150 kg)

Career information
- High school: Thayer Academy (MA)
- College: Miami (FL) (2023–present)
- Stats at ESPN

Samson Okunlola (born October 12, 2004), nicknamed "Pancake Honcho", is an American college football offensive tackle for the Miami Hurricanes.

== Early life ==
Okunlola grew up in Brockton, Massachusetts, and attended the Thayer Academy in Braintree, Massachusetts. He was rated as a five-star recruit and one of the best players in the 2023 college football recruiting class, ranked at No. 16 by Rivals.com, ESPN.com, and 247Sports. He was the first five-star recruit from Massachusetts in the history of recruiting rankings.

== College career ==
After receiving scholarship offers from more than 50 schools, Okunlola committed to the University of Miami in December 2022. Along with Francis Mauigoa, Miami signed two of the top three tackles in the 2023 recruiting class.

== Personal life ==
Okunlola's older brother, Samuel, is a defensive lineman for the Virginia Tech Hokies.
