= Swann Chemical Company =

- Founder: Theodore Swann

The Swann Chemical Company was an American chemical company started by Theodore Swann, described by one historian as "a flamboyant Birmingham mogul and New South industrialist." Swann Chemical first operated a chemical manufacturing plant in Anniston, Alabama where PCBs were first made on an industrial scale after development of a new process under leadership of Theodore Swann. The plant was later bought by Monsanto Industrial Chemicals Co. in 1935. The plant, just west of Anniston, had around 1,000 employees.

One historian wrote that, "In many ways, the spirit of Swann Chemical became the corporate culture of Monsanto."
