= Theodore Swann =

American industrialist (1886–1955)

- Born: September 6, 1886; Dandridge, Tennessee, U.S.
- Died: February 5, 1955 (aged 68); Birmingham, Alabama. U.S.
- Education: Carson-Newman College; Virginia Institute
- Occupation: Industrialist
- Known for: Founder of Swann Chemical Company
- Spouse: Catherine McDonald Dunwoody
- Children: 2 (Catherine M. Swann, Virginia Dunwoody Swann)
- Parent(s): John Samuel Swann and Sonora M. Williams

Theodore Swann (September 6, 1886 – February 5, 1955) was an American industrialist and early leader of the chemical industry. He was described by one historian as "a flamboyant Birmingham mogul and New South industrialist."

== Early life ==
Swann was born on September 6, 1886, in Dandridge, Tennessee. He came from a family divided by the American Civil War as his father was a Confederate soldier.

== Career ==
In his early working years, Swann was a power salesman for the Alabama Power Company. He was recruited to organize the company's sales department and would later represent it on the state munition board, which was set up to advise the Wilson administration on industrial capacity.

He established the Federal Phosphorus Company to produce concentrated phosphoric acid, mainly for use as a concentrated fertilizer, using a novel method to produce the acid from phosphate rock by heat treatment in an electric furnace.

He later established the Swann Chemical Company, focused on production of PCBs for the emergent electrical industry. Swann Chemical Company operated a chemical manufacturing plant in Anniston, Alabama where PCBs were first made on an industrial scale after development of a new process under Swann's leadership. In 1920, Swann gave his engineers the challenge of creating a process by which PCBs, up to that time very expensive and produced only in small quantities, could be produced in industrial quantities, and after much trial and error, they succeeded. He was noted for motivating his workers with inflated wages via "pass-off" chits, which were a forerunner of stock options. The plant was later bought by Monsanto Industrial Chemicals Co. in 1935. The plant, just west of Anniston, had around 1,000 employees. One historian wrote that, "In many ways, the spirit of Swann Chemical became the corporate culture of Monsanto." During the war, his company develop potash out of Georgia potash-bearing shale when supply had been cut off from Germany.

Swann's house in Birmingham, Alabama, built from 1927 to 1930, was at the time the largest residence in the city and cost $600,000 to build.

While Monsanto became the most successful agrochemical corporation in the world, Swann began to slide into poverty. He was forced to sell his castle in 1945 when he filed for bankruptcy. He nearly made a comeback by selling a new design for a furnace to process iron ore to the Cuban dictator Fulgencio Batista, but the dictator reneged after paying only a modest down payment. Theodore Swann died selling aluminum window frames on February 5, 1955.
