= National Center of Afro-American Artists =

Organization for Black and African diasporic art

- Predecessor: Elma Lewis School of Fine Arts
- Formation: 1968; 57 years ago
- Founder: Elma Lewis
- Founded at: Roxbury, MA
- Website: ncaaa.org

The National Center of Afro-American Artists (NCAAA) is a center in Roxbury, Boston, Massachusetts, founded in 1968 by Elma Lewis to "preserv[e] and foster the cultural arts heritage of black peoples worldwide through arts teaching, and the presentation of professional works in all fine arts disciplines." Although the organization's name specifies African-American artists, the organizational mandate includes all African diasporic art. The NCAAA is the largest independent black cultural arts institution in New England, United States. Its alumni have distinguished themselves in the performing arts internationally.

== History and founding ==
The museum subsumed Lewis's previously launched Elma Lewis School of Fine Arts. Since 1950, the Elma Lewis School of Fine Arts has served Boston citizens of all ages. Its alumni have distinguished themselves in the performing arts internationally. In the 1990s, the NCAAA completely renovated and expanded the 34,000 square foot building with its studios, auditorium, cafeteria, offices and classrooms. The school continued to serve as an educational and cultural center, it has been a hub of forums, receptions and civil programs of community interests.

At its founding, the NCAAA was housed in a former firehouse in Franklin Park, Boston. The museum was moved to a separate building in 1980 and is now located at the Museum of the National Center of Afro-American Artists.

Two fires in the early 1980s significantly damaged the firehouse, where the NCAAA was housed, although collections stored at the museum, which had its own facility, were unharmed.

Harriet Forte Kennedy served as the assistant director of the museum for some time.

== Activities ==
Activities of the NCAAA have included:

- the establishment and maintenance of a museum;
- hosting arts performances ("Black Musical Productions" and others) and exhibitions, individually and in collaboration with other fine arts museums in Boston;
- offering arts education programs to a variety of students (professional, community primary students, and local prisoners).

== Publications ==
Gaither, Edmund (1970). Afro-American Artists: New York and Boston. Boston, Massachusetts: National Center of Afro-American Artists; Museum of Fine Arts.

== See also ==
- List of museums focused on African Americans
