= Samuel Okunlola =

American football player (born 2003)

No. 51 – Virginia Tech Hokies
- Position: Defensive end
- Class: Redshirt Senior

Personal information
- Born: September 27, 2003 (age 23); Brockton, Massachusetts, U.S.
- Listed height: 6 ft 3 in (1.91 m)
- Listed weight: 249 lb (113 kg)

Career information
- High school: Thayer Academy (Braintree, Massachusetts)
- College: Pittsburgh (2022–2023); Colorado (2024–2025); Virginia Tech (2026–present)
- Stats at ESPN

Samuel Okunlola (born September 27, 2003) is an American college football defensive end for the Virginia Tech Hokies. He previously played for the Pittsburgh Panthers and Colorado Buffaloes.

== Early life ==
Okunlola attended the Thayer Academy in Braintree, Massachusetts, and was rated as a three-star recruit before committing to play college football for the Pittsburgh Panthers.

== College career ==
=== Pittsburgh ===
As a freshman in 2022, Okunlola appeared in four games where he recorded no statistics. In week 7 of the 2023 season, he notched four tackles, a sack, a forced fumble, and a fumble recovery, in an upset win over Louisville. Okunlola finished the season with 18 tackles with six being for a loss, five sacks, a forced fumble, and a fumble recovery in 11 games for the Panthers.

=== Colorado ===
Okunlola transferred to play for the Colorado Buffaloes.

=== Virginia Tech ===
Okunlola transferred to play for the Virginia Tech Hokies.

== Personal life ==
Okunlola's younger brother Samson is an offensive tackle for the Miami Hurricanes.
