= Sarah-Ann Shaw =

American journalist (1933–2024)

- Born: November 6, 1933; Boston, Massachusetts, U.S.
- Died: March 21, 2024 (aged 90)
- Education: Girls' Latin School; Boston University
- Occupation: Television reporter
- Known for: Boston's WBZ-TV first female African American television reporter

Sarah-Ann Shaw (November 6, 1933 – March 21, 2024) was an American journalist and television reporter with WBZ-TV from 1969 to 2000. She was best known as the first female African-American reporter to be televised in Boston. Shaw was also known for her presence in civil rights movements and as a volunteer in education programs. Her recognition was widespread, including awards from the National Association for the Advancement of Colored People (NAACP), Rosie's Place, the Museum of Afro-American History, and Action for Boston Community Development (ABCD).

== Early life and education ==
Shaw was born in the Roxbury neighborhood of Boston, to parents involved in the community. Sarah-Ann's father, Norris King Jr. was an active member in the Roxbury Democratic Club. Her mother, Annie Bell Bomar King, was involved in the distinguished civil rights activities of Melnea Cass.

During her years at William P. Boardman Elementary School and Henry Lee Higginson Elementary School, Shaw was active at St. Mark's Social Center. She completed her secondary studies at Boston Latin Academy (formerly known as Girl's Latin School) and was associated with the NAACP Youth Movement. After graduating in 1952, Shaw was admitted to Boston University where she studied briefly.

== Career ==
In the early 1960s, Shaw joined the Boston Action Group in association with St. Mark's Social Center before being recruited to serve as director of the Boston Northern Student Movement. She led various projects centered on voter education and registration, in addition to supporting welfare programs in housing, rights and advocacy. Subsequently, she oversaw Boston's anti-poverty program, Neighborhood Operations for ABCD, as well as the Community Health Education Program at the Ecumenical Center.

In 1968 that Shaw made her first television appearance on Say Brother (now known as Basic Black), a public affairs broadcast by Ray Richardson. After numerous appearances on the show, she was hired by WBZ-TV as Boston's first female African American reporter in 1969. Shaw strived to oust prevalent racial stereotypes by featuring special reports that emphasized contributions made by minorities in Massachusetts.

== Personal life ==
Shaw was married with one child, two grandchildren, and a great-grandchild. Her daughter, Klare E. Shaw, is a leader in the funding community for her contributions to non-profits in the Commonwealth's cultural community, and became the executive director of the Boston Globe Foundation in 1999.

Shaw died on March 21, 2024, at the age of 90.

== Honors and awards ==
Shaw was honored posthumously by the Boston Public Library and the City of Boston on June 23, 2025, when Mayor Michelle Wu announced that the Roxbury branch of the Boston Public Library would be renamed in Shaw's honor. The branch is now the Shaw-Roxbury Branch of the Boston Public Library.

Shaw received several outstanding awards over the years:

- 1998 National Association of Black Journalists' "Lifetime Achievement Award"
- 2000 Emerson College RTNDA's (Radio Television News Direction Association) "Lifetime Achievement Award"
- 2000 Society of Newspaper Editors' "Yankee Quill Award"
- 2001 Boston Celtics' "'A Hero Among Us' Award"
- 2002 The Woman of Courage's "Community Service Award"
- 2002 Psi Omega Chapter of AKA Sorority's "Community Service Award"
- 2003 Massachusetts Women's Political Caucus Abigail Adams Award
- 2004 Pleasant Hill Baptist Church Community Legend Award
- 2005 Harlem Book Fair-Roxbury's "Charles Yancey Literacy Award"
- 2006 The Advent School Mona Hull Award for Education
- 2007 Teen Voices' "Intergenerational Activist Award"
- 2007 Charles Hamilton Houston Institute and the City of Boston's "Local Hero Award"
- 2007 Roxbury Community College's "Community Service Award"
- 2008 Roxbury Action Program's "In Sight Award"
- 2008 Broadcasters Hall of Fame induction
- 2009 Roxbury Collaborative's "Unsung Hero Award"
- 2014 Berklee City Music's "Unsung Heroes Award"

Shaw was also been presented with awards by the Black Educator's Alliance of Massachusetts, Boston Mayor Thomas Menino, The Boston Branch NAACP, The Boston Association of Black Journalists, The Irish Immigration Center, ABCD, Rosie's Place, the Cambridge YWCA and other groups and organizations.

Shaw on receiving the City of Boston's African-American achievement award in 1996 by Mayor Thomas Menino: —

"I'm surprised, touched and teary about receiving this award," she added, "You can't be in this world alone; you have to stand up for what's right."
