= Campbell brothers =

Campbell brothers may refer to one of the following:

- ALS Limited, a company originally named "Campbell Brothers"
- The Campbell Brothers, American musical group
- Campbell brothers (criminal duo), American criminal duo
