= Beautiful Me(s): Finding Our Revolutionary Selves =

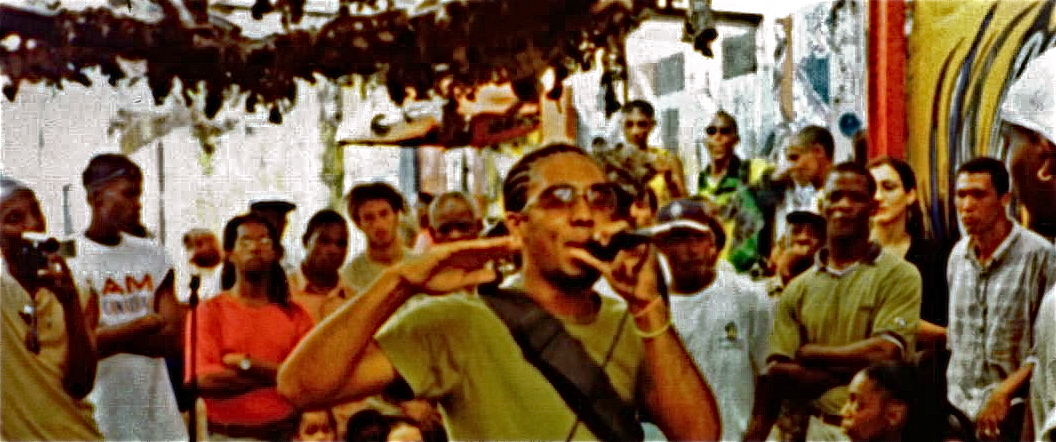
- Lo Maligno, rapper performing in Havana, May 2002
- Directed by: Robin J. Hayes
- Written by: Robin J. Hayes
- Produced by: Besenia Rodriguez
- Release date: 2008
- Running time: 45 minutes
- Country: United States
- Language: English

Beautiful Me(s): Finding Our Revolutionary Selves in Black Cuba is a short documentary that depicts a predominantly African American group of Yale University students who are passionately concerned about racial inequality. The students, whose sense of being marginalized within the university led to their intrigue with the revolutionary culture of Cuba and its antagonistic relationship with the United States, decide to take an extraordinary "field trip" to Havana and Santiago in May 2002. They embarked on the trip as a way to study an alternative society that accepts and embraces its African roots. These students come to experience the distinct culture of Cuba that is driven by its sense of community and hope.

The documentary, which focuses on the students' reactions to Cuban society, includes footage of hip hop, reggae and rumba performances, interviews with Cuban scholars and scenes of everyday life in Havana and Santiago that the students shot themselves, as well as interviews with the travelers that captures their reflections after the trip.

Beautiful Me(s) has premiered at several film festivals including, the International Pan African Film Festival in Cannes (2009), Africa World Documentary Film Festival (2009), Roxbury Film Festival (2008), Austin Women's Film Festival (2008), and the Riverside International Film Festival (2008). It has also been shown to enthusiastic audiences at campuses throughout the United States and Canada, including University of California, Berkeley (2009), University of Southern California (2009), The New School (2008), Macalester College (2008) and University of California, Davis (2008).
