= James Martorano =

American mobster

- Born: December 10, 1941 (age 84); Somerville, Massachusetts, U.S.
- Other name: Jimmy
- Occupations: Gangster, Caporegime
- Years active: 1960s–1995
- Relatives: Johnny Martorano (brother)
- Allegiance: Patriarca crime family
- Criminal charges: Loansharking, extortion and horse race-fixing

James Martorano (Italian: [martoˈraːno]; born December 10, 1941) is an American organized crime figure with ties to the Winter Hill Gang of South Boston, Massachusetts, and a member of the Patriarca crime family as of 1995. Martorano is the younger brother of notorious "hitman" and later government witness, John Martorano.

== Early life ==
James Martorano was born in Somerville, Massachusetts. His father, Angelo "Andy" Martorano was an immigrant from Riesi, Sicily, Italy. His mother, Elizabeth Mary "Bess" Hunt, was an Anglo-American full-time homemaker. The Martorano family soon moved to East Milton, Massachusetts.

Martorano attended Thayerlands Elementary School in Braintree, Massachusetts, and graduated from Milton High School in Milton, Massachusetts, in 1959. His graduating high school yearbook quote was "Popularity is Glory". He later went on to achieve a Bachelor of Arts from Boston College after accepting an athletic scholarship, something his brother John turned down after many potential offers.

== Criminal career ==
During the 1960s, James and John Martorano were associates of the Roxbury Gang, an Italian American gang based in the Roxbury neighborhood of Boston which was affiliated with the Patriarca crime family, while working in nightclubs owned by their father, a Patriarca associate. In 1964, James Martorano was involved in the murder of Margaret Sylvester, a 33-year-old waitress at Luigi's, an afterhours club in Boston's Combat Zone owned by his father, who was found beaten and stabbed to death and stuffed into a bag on an upper floor of the club. In an attempt to protect his brother from prosecution, John Martorano tracked down and killed two men who could implicate him in the killing, Johnny Jackson and Bobby Palladino, Sylvester's boyfriend. Nonetheless, James Martorano was convicted of being an accessory after the fact of murder and sentenced to four-to-six years in state prison on December 14, 1966.

In 1976, as an associate of the Winter Hill Gang of Boston, Martorano was convicted of loansharking, extortion and fixing horse races. Martorano was convicted due to information provided to federal authorities by fellow gang members, James Bulger and Stephen Flemmi. After Martorano was sent to prison, his friend and informant Stephen Flemmi said, "Jimmy does good time". Martorano studied law while incarcerated. He made several appeals of his conviction and was granted a new trial in 1980. This decision, however, was reversed by the First Circuit Court of Appeals. After his release, he worked as paralegal.

In 1992, Martorano, then living in Quincy, Massachusetts, was one of 11 men arrested after a federal racketeering indictment was unsealed in Newark, New Jersey. The indictment accused Martorano of having conversations with Genovese crime family members in Boston, Staten Island, and Stamford, Connecticut, about gambling, extortion, and murder. Martorano's trial was severed from the trials of the others, eight of whom were convicted at a jury trial of charges relating to illegal gambling in Atlantic City and attempts to obtain construction contracts for Atlantic City International Airport.
