= Boston City League =

The Boston City League is a high school athletic conference in District 6 of the Massachusetts Interscholastic Athletic Association. All schools are located in the neighborhoods of Boston.

== Schools ==
The following 30 schools are members of the league. The teams are separated into three divisions: Boston City, Boston City North, and Boston City South.

Boston City
Boston Arts Academy
Boston Collaborative High School
Boston Day and Evening Academy
Boston International High School
Community Academy
Dearborn STEM Academy
Edward M. Kennedy Academy for Health Careers
Fenway High School
Greater Egleston Community High School
Henderson K-12 Inclusion School
Muniz Academy
Quincy Upper School

Boston City North
Another Course to College
Boston Latin Academy
Brighton High School
Charlestown High School
East Boston High School
English High School of Boston
Excel High School
Green Academy
Lyon Pilot Middle/High School
Madison Park High School
Melvin H. King South End Academy
Ruth Batson Academy
Muriel Sutherland Snowden International School at Copley

Boston City South
Albert D Holland School of Technology
Community Academy of Science & Health
New Mission High School
John D. O'Bryant School of Mathematics & Science
TechBoston Academy
