= Madison Park Technical Vocational High School =

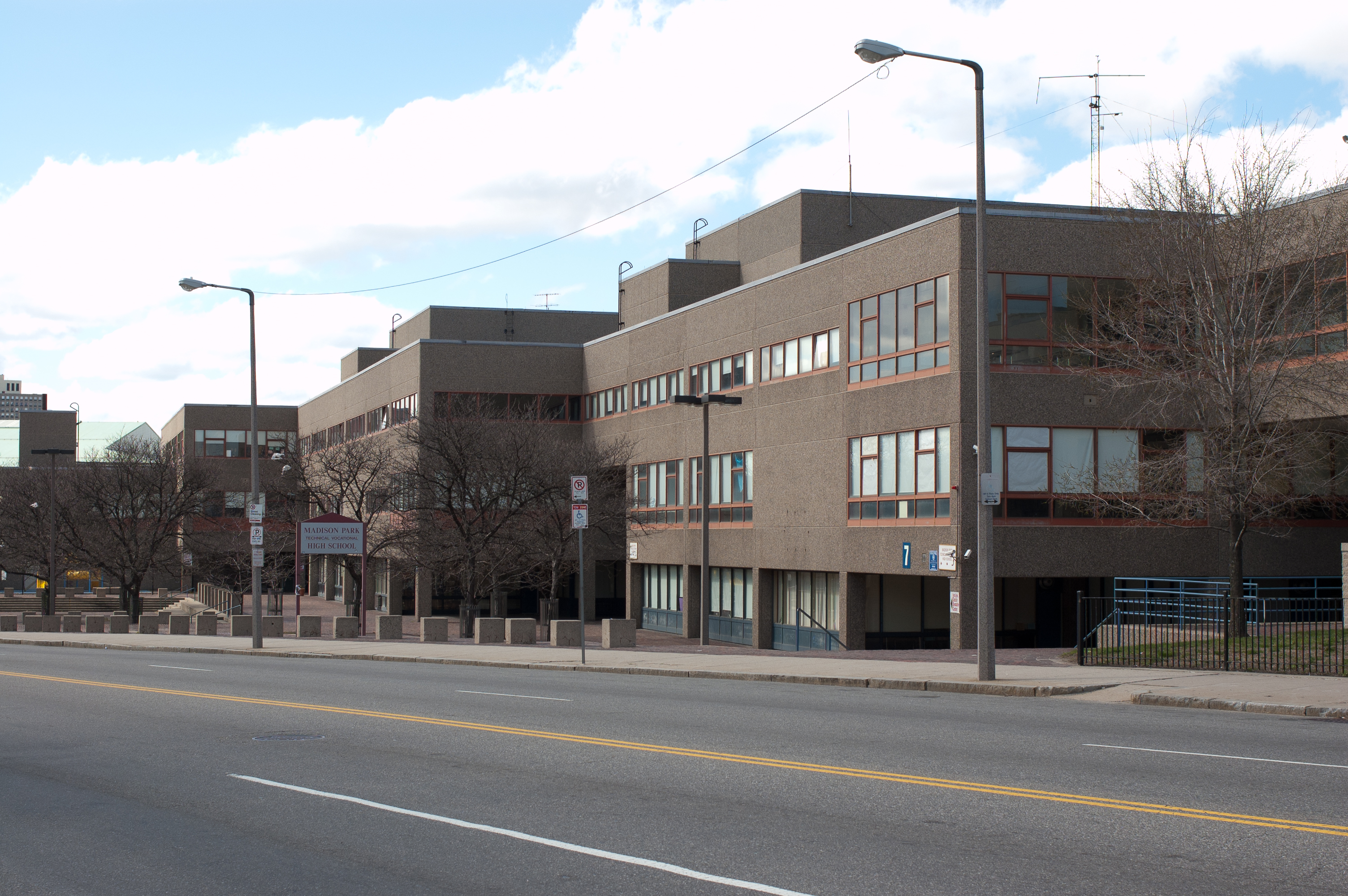

Location
- 75 Malcolm X Boulevard; Roxbury, Massachusetts 02120; United States; 42°19′54″N 71°05′23″W

Information
- Type: Public, Vocational
- Established: 1977
- School district: Boston Public Schools
- NCES School ID: 250279000282
- Head of School: Paul Neal
- Teaching staff: 118.80 (on FTE basis)
- Grades: 9 to 12
- Enrollment: 1,121 (2024-2025)
- Student to teacher ratio: 9.44
- Colors: Red & Silver Previous Colors: Burgundy & Gray / Maroon & Gray
- Slogan: MP Love, Pride, Spirit & Unity "Break Down, Stay Down"
- Athletics conference: Boston City League
- Mascot: Cardinals
- Accreditation: New England Association of Schools and Colleges
- Website: www.bostonpublicschools.org/madisonpark

Madison Park Technical Vocational High School is a public vocational technical high school located in the Roxbury neighborhood of Boston, Massachusetts, United States. It is the only technical vocational high school located in within the city of Boston. It is part of Boston Public Schools.

Madison Park is a large school with an enrollment of approximately 1,000 students from grades 9-12.

== Academics ==
=== Grade 9 ===
Students are enrolled into their freshman academic year where they take exploratory vocational career trials by semester. By the end of the school year students make the choice of what certification program they will major in for the remainder of the Sophomore year to Senior Year.

The School also provides English as a Secondary Language (ESL), for students of bilingual origin for all grades.

== Vocational programs ==
=== Grades 10–12 ===
Madison Park High has Vocational Training courses split into 2 Academies, according to their career:

Communications, Health Hospitality and Technology Academy	Civic Infrastructure Academy
Cosmetology	Automotive Collision and Repair
Culinary Arts	Automotive Technology
Dental Assisting	Carpentry
Design & Visual Communications	Electrical
Graphic Communications	Facilities Management
Health Assisting	Metal Fabrication
Hospitality	Plumbing
Information Support Systems & Networking	Sheet Metal
Marketing	HVAC
Medical Assisting	
Printing	
Television Production	

Students study their vocational courses on a week in - week out bi-weekly schedule. Academics on one week, followed by Vocational Study the next week. The main educational academics (i.e.: Math, English, Science etc.). may also be taught during a vocational week in the event that vocation courses did not carry majority of the school day. During commencement exercises, graduates are awarded training certifications along with their diploma. The certification granted them the possibility of going on to work study / internships of their vocational related field. In the past, 12th graders in their final term who completed academic courses before the vocation course could not receive a vocation certification unless they completed their vocational study and the same for finishing vocational study first before the academic, this at times in the past made it a 5-Year school under circumstances.

Previous names of Academies & Careers were:

- Construction Design & Transportation Academy
- Health and Human Services Academy
- High Tech Academy
- Roland Hayes Division of Music

The school originally had a music annex in the late 70's which students had to commute Downtown Boston for courses. In the 90s the school would be eventually added behind the Roxbury school campus and was named Roland Hayes School of Music after musician Roland Hayes. The school of music was joined with their neighboring school, John D. O'Bryant School of Mathematics & Science, which students of both schools shared classes and held concerts and talent showcases. Students enrolled in the division also had the choice to choose their career path in music, taking 2 classes of their choice per year. Music was pronounced as a vocation with Madison Park High School, however did not qualify as a certification course. The Music division became ruled out from Madison Park's vocational line up in 2006 and since has only been occupied by the O'Bryant school.

Previous Music Division course of study:

- Piano (Organ, Electric)
- Wind Band (Flutes, Saxophones, Clarinets)
- Bass (Electric Guitar, Bass Guitar, Violin)
- Percussion (Drums, Xylophones)
- Vocal / Choral Performance
- Music Production / Note Study - added 3 years before the school's vocational cancellation

== Athletic programs ==
There are multiple sports teams that students can participate in throughout the year with the required actions. A Student must possess a 1.67 GPA while maintaining their school attendance higher than 93%. An updated documentation of physical examination is also required.

=== Sports ===
FALL	WINTER	SPRING
Boys’ Soccer	Boys’ Basketball	Boys’ Volleyball
Girls’ Soccer	Girls’ Basketball	Girls’ Volleyball
Girls’ Volleyball	Ice Hockey	Track & Field
Indoor Track	Baseball	
Cheerleading	Swimming	
Cross Country -Track

=== Marine Corps JROTC ===
At the beginning of the school year, students have the option of taking Marine Corps JROTC in place of the course Physical Education (PE). Recruits are educated in the Marines' history and train their fitness skills as well as learn life skills. Throughout the year JROTC participates in parades and competitions as well as serve their communities around the city.

== School campus ==
Madison Park's campus covers a large acre sharing surrounding buildings around Malcolm X. Boulevard: John D O'Bryant School, Reggie Lewis Track Athletic Center, Roland Hayes School of Music (which is behind the school). Nearby schools are the Timilty middle School and Roxbury Community College.

The school is wheelchair accessible, equipped with elevators.

== Notable alumni ==
- Anselmo "Jair" Ribeiro, Athlete - International Soccer Player, whose professional career started in the Sporting Clube de Portugal
- Richy Peña, Grammy Award Winning Music Producer

== In media ==
Throughout the years, Madison Park has made headline news various times, whether it was small local news or documentaries:

- WGBH Network - Basic Black: Eye on Education Series (episode #3104) "High Stakes at Madison Park" (2000). | The documentary follows 3 Freshman students who are faced with challenges to pass the city's newly required MCAS standardize exam in order to graduate in their coming 2003 senior year. They would be the first graduating class to take the test.
- ABC Network "Boston 24/7" (2002) - Season 1, Episode 2. | A show centering civil servants who help Boston communities while on the job. This particular episode focused on the previous acting Headmaster, Mr. Charles McAfee, as he deals with the pressures of managing the high school through different obstacles of the school day.
- ESPN Classic Network - "PUSH: Madison vs. Madison" (2012) | A sports documentary chronicling the highs and lows of Madison Park High School's Basketball team coached by Dennis Wilson, a well respected Coach, Mentor and Teacher at the high school. He challenges to keep the players on track while they deal with on/off court obstacles.
