= Roxbury Film Festival =

American film festival

- Opening film: 1998
- Location: New England, U.S.
- Founded by: Candelaria Silva; Lisa Simmons
- Language: English
- Website: roxfilmfest.com

The Roxbury International Film Festival (RoxFilm; formerly known as Dudley Film Festival) is the largest film festival in New England that celebrates people of color. RoxFilm was founded in 1998 and holds both an annual film festival and year-round screenings and events in the historic Roxbury neighborhood of Boston.

Since its inception, the festival has welcomed over 38,000 attendees and has screened more than 700 films. RoxFilm’s mission is to support diverse filmmakers by providing an opportunity for audiences to view their works and experience the stories often overlooked in mainstream media.

== Origin ==
Candelaria Silva, former Director of ACT Roxbury, along with Lisa Simmons, president of The Color of Film Collaborative founded the first Roxbury International Film Festival, then called the Dudley Film Festival, in 1998. Starting with a five thousand dollar grant to ACT Roxbury (no longer in existence), the film festival was born. The Roxbury International Film Festival was co-produced by the non-profits ACT Roxbury and The Color of Film Collaborative and now is produced solely by the Color of Film. The Festival changed its name to The Roxbury International Film Festival in 2010 in recognition of its geographic reach. Currently, the RoxFilm Committee receives submissions from filmmakers all over the world.

== Festival ==
The Roxbury International Film Festival is typically held at the end of June. Over the course of 10 days the festival screens all genres of films, holds workshops and panel discussions and offers filmmakers the opportunity to network with each other as well as audience members. Screenings take place at the Museum of Fine Arts, Haley House Bakery Café, Hibernian Hall, and other sites in and around Roxbury, Massachusetts.

The Roxbury International Film Festival is a competitive festival that awards certificates in the categories of Audience Favorite, Narrative Film, Documentary Film, Narrative Short, Documentary Short, Youth, Emerging Filmmaker Award and a special award named after award-winning filmmaker Henry Hampton.

The 8th annual festival held in 2006 was especially notable for the range of award-winning international films screened throughout the five-day festival. Films from Brazil, Cuba, Haiti and France were featured and several international films won recognition and cash prizes in RFF’s competitive awards.

The 22nd annual festival held in 2020 was the first online festival including virtual screenings of 60+ films, Q&As, daily script readings with local writers and actors, filmmaker hangouts, a DJ after-party via Zoom, and a panel about POC Media Makers in Massachusetts. The Festival celebrated its 25th season in 2023.

Past special guests at the festival include: Jasmine Guy, Yoruba Richen, Deborah Riley Draper, Matthew A. Cherry, DeMane Davis, Qasim Basir, Khari B., Billy Dee Williams, Victoria Rowell, Russ Parr, Michael Beach, CCH Pounder, Willie O’Ree, Shamier Anderson.
