= John D. O'Bryant School of Mathematics & Science =

Coordinates: 42.3310°N 71.0879°W

The John D. O'Bryant School of Mathematics and Science

Location
- 55 Malcolm X Boulevard; Roxbury, Massachusetts; United States

Information
- Type: Public exam school
- Motto: Nil satis nisi optimum. (Nothing but the best is good enough.)
- Established: 1893
- Head of School: Patreka Wood
- Grades: 7–12
- Enrollment: 1,428 (2015-16)
- Campus: Urban
- Colors: Blue and White
- Athletics conference: Boston City League
- Mascot: Tiger
- Rival: Boston Latin Academy
- Accreditation: NEASC
- Yearbook: The Technician
- Affiliations: Boston Public Schools
- Website: Official website

The John D. O'Bryant School of Mathematics and Science (abbreviated as O'B), formerly known as Boston Technical High School is a college preparatory public exam school along with Boston Latin School and Boston Latin Academy. The O’Bryant specializes in science, technology, engineering and mathematics ("STEM") in the city of Boston, Massachusetts, and is named for one of Boston's prominent African-American educators John D. O'Bryant. The school is currently located on 55 Malcolm X Boulevard in the neighborhood of Roxbury, Massachusetts. With a student body of 1,500 7th–12th graders, this school is part of the Boston Public Schools. It currently shares a campus with the Madison Park Technical Vocational High School.

== History ==
The logo for Boston Technical High School

Now over one hundred years old, the O'Bryant began as the Mechanic Arts High School in 1893. Until the early 1970s, it was an all-boys school. In 1944, the school became Boston Technical High School. The original building containing the various shops, woodworking, machine shop, forge shop and drafting rooms was built around 1900 and was located on the corner of Dalton and Belvidere Streets in the Back Bay. The Hilton Hotel is located there today. In 1909 the five-story class room, chemistry and physics labs building was completed on Scotia Street adjacent to the older building. Later, the school moved to the building that originally housed Roxbury Memorial High School (1930 to 1960) at 205 Townsend Street in Roxbury, Massachusetts. That school building is now the home of Boston Latin Academy. Boston Technical High School remained there until 1987 when it relocated to a new building at 55 New Dudley Street (now Malcolm X Boulevard). In 1989, Boston Technical High School and Mario Umana Technical High School merged but still kept the name of Boston Technical High School. In 1994, the school graduated the first class for the school renamed after Boston educator John D. O'Bryant.

== Proposed Move ==
As part of a larger plan to reorganize Boston public high schools, in June 2023 Mayor Michelle Wu and Superintendent Mary Skipper announced a plan to relocate the O'Bryant school from its Roxbury location to a new site at the former West Roxbury Educational Complex on the southwestern edge of the city. Proponents of the plan cite that the fact that the relocation will allow the Madison Park Technical Vocational High School to double in physical size by becoming the sole occupant of the Malcolm X Boulevard campus while also offering the O'Bryant newly renovated facilities and the capacity to enroll up to 1200 additional students in its new location, initially scheduled to open in 2026.

Many O'Bryant students and parents have voiced opposition to the plan to move the school from its current location in the predominately Black neighborhood of Roxbury, serviced by multiple MBTA bus lines as well as the Orange subway line and the commuter rail, to the predominately white neighborhood of West Roxbury, which is not easily accessible using public transportation. Additionally, many cite the historical and cultural value of its current home in Roxbury near Nubian Square as a strength of the school and its function in serving a majority nonwhite student population. During the 2022-2023, the student body of the O'Bryant was the most racially diverse of Boston's three exam schools, with the Boston Globe reporting that "more than one-third of the students identified as Latino, 31 percent as Black, and 19 percent as Asian. Half spoke a native language other than English, and nearly 60 percent were low income."

In December 2023, the Boston City Council passed a nonbinding resolution by a vote of nine to two in opposition to the move. On February 27, 2024, Mayor Wu alerted the families of O'Bryant and Madison Park students via email that the plan to relocate the O'Bryant to West Roxbury would not move forward. The Boston Globe characterized the decision as a response to "months of vociferous community opposition."

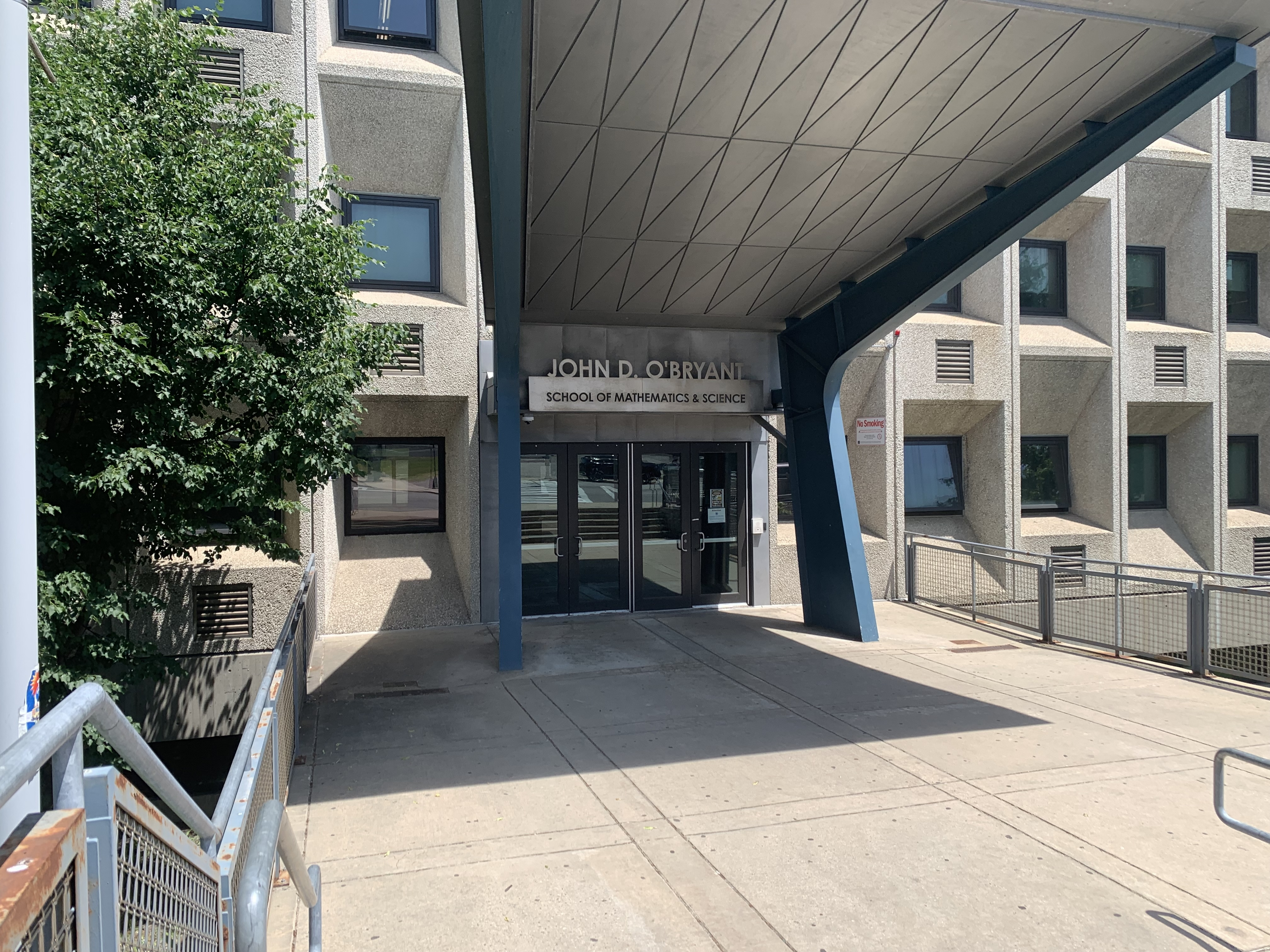
The main entrance to Building 3 of the O'Bryant's campus.

== Demographics ==
O’Bryant was an all male school until the early 70’s by 2022, 48% were male and 52% were female. O’Bryant has a 88% minority enrollment, with 35.1% being Hispanic, 31.2% being Black, 19.1% being Asian, 11.9% being White, 2.6% being other or unknown.

== Notable alumni ==
- Liz Miranda (Class of 1998), Massachusetts State Senator
- Fred Ahern (Class of 1970), former National Hockey League player
- Harry Barnes (Class of 1964), NBA player
- William Bratton (Class of 1965), former Chief of Police for the LAPD, NYPD, and BPD
- Ames T. Brown (Class of 1908), Adjutant General of New York
- Alvin Campbell, member of the Campbell brothers criminal duo
- Richard Egan (Class of 1953), co-founder of EMC Corporation and former United States Ambassador to Ireland
- Arthur Gajarsa (Class of 1958), federal judge in the United States Court of Appeals for the Federal Circuit
- Odin Lloyd, murder victim
- Wayne Selden Jr. (left in 2010 after his freshman year), basketball player in the Israeli Basketball Premier League
- Dan Sullivan (Class of 1957), former National Football League player
- N.C. Wyeth (Class of 1899), artist and illustrator
- Charles Yancey (Class of 1965), Boston City Councillor
