= Campbell brothers (criminal duo) =

Two Americans involved in Boston crime

The Campbell Brothers Alvin and Arnold Campbell
- Born: Alvin: c. 1933-1934; Arnold: c. 1935
- Died: Alvin: c. 2001–2002
- Spouse: Alvin: Denise (died 1983)
- Children: Alvin: 3, including Andrea; Arnold: 1
- Criminal information
- Allegiance: Winter Hill Gang (associated)
- Criminal charges: Both: Bank robbery (1958); Alvin: Conspiracy and selling cocaine (1970); Possession of drugs, guns (1982)
- Penalty: Both: 5 years prison (after retrial; 1963); Alvin: 20 years prison (1970); 8 years prison (1982)

Details
- Country: United States
- State: Massachusetts
- Locations: Boston, primarily the Roxbury neighborhood

The Campbell brothers were an American criminal duo active in Boston, Massachusetts, for several decades during the mid-20th century, consisting of Arnold S. Campbell and Alvin R. Campbell Sr. The Campbell brothers were regarded to have associations with the Winter Hill Gang. Their criminal activities primarily centered in the Roxbury neighborhood of Boston. The Campbell brothers were plaintiffs in the 1963 United States Supreme Court case Campbell v. United States, which related to their criminal trial for a 1957 bank robbery. The ruling granted them and a co-defendant a retrial, in which the brothers were again convicted but received a more lenient sentence). In the late 1960s, the brothers were tried along their acquaintance Dennis W. Chandler for the November 1968 triple homicide of Guido St. Laurent, Carnell Eaton, and Harold King (who were shot in an attack on the Roxbury headquarters office of the community nonprofit N.E.G.R.O. All three were acquitted (found "not guilty"). A key witness of the attack was killed before the trial; Johnny Martorano (a Winter Hill Gang hitman) confessed decades later to murdering the witness to prevent him from testifying against the brothers.

In the early 1980s, authorities claimed that Alvin Campbell was the "leading black organized crime figure in New England".

== Early lives ==
Alvin Campbell was between one and two years older than Arnold.

In his 1969 criminal trial testimony, Alvin Campbell stated that he grew up in the Boston neighborhood of Roxbury and attended Boston Technical High School. Per statements made by Alvin Campbell and others in his 1958 and 1969 criminal trials, he was a strong student and was granted a four-year scholarship to Princeton University in 1951, which was later revoked. If he had attended, he would have been among the first black undergraduates there (an Ivy League university). Alvin's daughter, Andrea, shared that while he refused to explain during his life why he did not enroll, she later learned independently that his opportunity to attend was derailed when he was arrested for the first time at the age of 17. Andrea Campbell recounted learning that, despite friends and relatives testifying as character witnesses in support of leniency, her father was refused leniency. She speculated that his first arrest and the loss of his opportunity to attend Princeton may have "cemented where [he] was going [with his life]".

The Campbells' father, Cyrill Campbell, had a criminal record of his own. The Campbell brothers began criminal involvement at the age of fourteen. By 1957, around the time Alvin was 24 and Arnold was 23, the two brothers were ascending the ranks of the local organized crime scene.

== 1958/1963 federal bank robbery convictions ==
=== Original trial ===
In 1958, the Campbell brothers were convicted with Donald Lester for a July 18, 1957 bank robbery at a Norfolk County Bank and Trust branch in Canton, Massachusetts. The three men were convicted in the United States District Court for the District of Massachusetts. Federal Judge William T. McCarthy gave all three men 25-year federal prison sentences.

The robbery on July 18, 1957 saw a heist of $31,618. The robbers locked twenty employees and patrons in a vault. In sentencing the three men, Judge McCarthy claimed that the twenty individuals only averted death by suffocation because the robbers inadvertently did not completely close the vault door. When delivering the sentence, Judge McCarthy castigated the local Roxbury courts and the Middlesex County for allowing the Campbell brothers to previously escape the law, saying that the brothers had benefited from "fix after fix after fix".

=== Appeal ===
The three men appealed their conviction. The initial appeal centered on the argument that the Jencks Act was violated when Judge McCarthy refused to require the state to enforce their counsel's request for production for Federal Bureau of Investigation reports that would have shown that a key witness to the crime originally reported to authorities seeing two robbers instead of three. The defense counsel desired to utilize this documentation for witness impeachment. In the appeal, the three men were represented by Massachusetts attorneys Melvin S. Louson and Lawrence O'Donnell Sr. O'Donnell was well known for his legal work in relation to the Great Brink's Robbery. Roger G. Connor argued the federal government's case before the Supreme Court for upholding the conviction.

An appeal was heard by the United States Court of Appeals for the First Circuit. Argument for the case began on August 27, 1959. On September 15, 1959, the court delivered a ruling that denied the appellants petition for a rehearing.

The appeal was next argued to the Supreme Court of the United States in Campbell v. United States (373 U.S. 487). Argument was heard on April 25, 1963. On May 27, 1963, the Court delivered an opinion favorable to the appellants and authored by Justice William J. Brennan. The Supreme Court decision did not vacate the conviction. Rather, it remanded the matter to the District Court, ordering it to "hold a new inquiry" in accordance with the holdings of the Supreme Court opinion that would "supplement the record with new findings and enter a new final judgment of conviction if the court concludes upon the new inquiry to reaffirm its former rulings." Justice Tom C. Clark authored a partial dissent and partial concurrence joined by Justices John Marshall Harlan II and Potter Stewart. This agreed in part with the result, concurring with the majority's decision to remand the case. This opinion declared that Judge McCarthy did not properly probe whether the documentation was producible, but this opinion did not opine on whether it would indeed have been producible under the Jencks Act.

Arguments for the remanded appeals case before the United States Court of Appeals for the First Circuit began on October 2, 1961. On November 7, 1961, the court issued an opinion that remanded the matter to new criminal trial before a new judge.

=== Retrial ===
The retrial of the three men began on August 14, 1963. The case was presided over by Judge Charles Edward Wyzanski Jr. On August 15, 1963, Lester was acquitted. The Campbell brothers, however, were again found guilty. In the Campbell brothers' sentencing on August 22, 1963, Wyzanski heeded a recommendation by Assistant U.S. Attorney William J. Koen to give the brothers sentences that were much shorter than those that McCarthy had handed them in the first trial. The Campbell brothers were given new five-year prison sentences.

== 1969 homicide trial and acquittal ==
Shortly after they completed their five-year prison sentences, the Campbell brothers again found themselves facing serious criminal charges, this time for murder. In 1969, when Alvin was 35 years old and Arnold was 33, the Campbell brothers faced trial alongside Dennis W. Chandler for the triple-murder of Guido St. Laurent, Carnell Eaton, and Harold King as well as on further charges of assault with intent to murder Ronald Hicks and Frederick B. Rose. The charges included first degree homicide.

St. Laurent, a blind man who was a community organizer, civil rights leader, and ex-convict, was the leader of the group New England Grass Roots Organization (NEGRO). The other two casualties of the triple homicide were also leaders within the organization. They were all shot to death on November 13, 1968 at the organization's headquarters office on Blue Hill Avenue in Boston's Roxbury neighborhood.

Both Campbell brothers had been working as salaried employees at the Boston operation of the New York City-based firm Woolman Systems. Also working at this firm were murder victims St. Laurent and Harold King, described as specializing "in work in ghettos with the federal government". Since King was from out of town (visiting from Cleveland), he was believed to be an unfortunate bystander of the attack rather than a target. At the time of the murders, Alvin Campbell had just started working as the project director for an automotive training center operated by the firm and Arnold Campbell had just become its director of training. Alleged accomplice Dennis W. Chandler worked as the night watchman there. Woolman Systems was then a significant sub-contractor of a new $2 million program to employ the chronically unemployed as part of the Roxbury-Dorchester-South End Greater Boston Consortium that was implementing a job training program in Boston. In the case against the three men, the prosecution alleged that they committed the murder and assault with intent to murder because of a dispute over federal money provided to give job training to chronically unemployed Roxbury residents.

Investigators were first directed to the three charged men after Ronald Hicks, a pimp who survived the fatal shooting incident, named the Campbell brothers and Chandler as likely culprits and assigned the aforementioned motive. In March 1969, (two months before the trial start), Hicks (who was the prosecution's main witness) was found shot to death in his car in Boston's Back Bay neighborhood. It is believed that Johnny Martorano perpetrated this murder to prevent Hicks from testifying against the Campbell brothers. Martorano confessed this to a federal prosecutor.

The trial took place in the Suffolk County Superior Court and lasted three weeks. The trial had an all-white fifteen member jury, while all three defendants were black.

The defense, among other things, pointed out that one gun used to commit the murders was found three days later in the possession of Ronald Randolph, a man shot and killed during a police chase. The state chose not to put forth any theories of how the gun came into Randolph's possession. A photo was also displayed by the defense that placed Randolph at the murder scene the night of the killings. However, a photo was shown to Frederick B. Rose, who survived the shooting, who testified that he was certain that Randolph was not involved in the attack. A witness who knew the defendants testified for the defense that he saw five men who were not the defendants flee the NEGRO headquarters on the night of the murders. Additionally, the wives of each Campbell brothers and the girlfriend of Chandler corroborated alibis that they were with their respective partners that night.

In June 1969, the three men were acquitted.

== Alvin Campbell's 1970 conviction for conspiracy and sale of cocaine ==
By the time the 1970s came along, Alvin Campbell was regarded as possibly aspiring to ascend to the very top of Boston's organized crime hierarchy. Ron Wysocki of The Boston Globe wrote in 1972, "many street savvy people believed that Campbell's aim was to become Boston's first black leader of organized crime." However, in 1970, Alvin Campbell and Dennis W. Chandler were both given 20-year federal prison sentences for conspiracy and selling cocaine. Dennis W. Chandler was later shot to death outside of his home in Roxbury on November 25, 1977.

== Alvin Campbell's 1982 conviction for gun and drug crimes ==
By 1982, Alvin Campbell and his wife Denise had three children. Their eldest child was their son Alvin Jr. Their two younger children, son Andre and daughter Andrea, were twins born in 1982.

On November 23, 1982, by which time Campbell was out of prison on parole, the Boston Police Department conducted a police raid of the apartment where Campbell and his family lived and arrested Campbell. This ultimately led to another criminal conviction that would land him behind bars until his twin younger children were eight-years-old.

The reason for the police raid was to determine whether Campbell had a connection to three different murders. While conducting the raid, the police found five guns, including a sawed-off M-1 with a silencer, a 9mm automatic pistol with a silencer, an automatic rifle, and a .22 caliber semiautomatic firearm. A loaded firearm was found under Campbell's mattress. Many charges were pressed against related to his possession of firearms, silencers and cocaine. Campbell faced multiple charges by the State of Massachusetts following the raid. However, all but one of these charges were dropped in December 1982 when the state decided it would hand over their case against Campbell so that federal investigators could instead explore the possibility of federal charges. The exception was that the state kept a charge against Campbell of assaulting a police officer during the raid. At the time, authorities claimed that Alvin Campbell was the, "leading black organized crime figure in New England". While awaiting sentencing, Campbell was held at MCI Cedar Junction. His wife, Roberta, died in a car crash while traveling to visit Campbell at the correctional institution. Ultimately, Campbell was convicted on March 5, 1983 in the United States District Court for the District of Massachusetts in a trial that was overseen by judge A. David Mazzone. Campbell received an eight-year prison sentence.

== Personal life of Alvin Campbell ==
Alvin Campbell spent half of his life in prison. At one point, Campbell was incarcerated at Leavenworth Prison at the same time as fellow Boston organized crime leader Whitey Bulger.

Campbell was married to Roberta P. Campbell. Campbell and his wife Roberta had three children. Their eldest child was son Alvin Jr. Their two other children, son Andre and daughter Andrea, were twins. Campbell was sentenced to an eight-year prison stint shortly after the birth of his twin children, and his wife Roberta died in a car crash on her way to pay him a visit at prison. As a result, their children were raised both in foster care and by various relatives. After he was released from prison, his children lived with him.

Campbell's two sons would ultimately also spend time in prison. Andre Campbell died at the age of 29 after suffering from scleroderma while in state custody awaiting trial. Most recently, his eldest son, Alvin Jr., in March 2020, was indicted on charges accusing him of serial rape. Campbell's daughter, Andrea, has become a successful politician and attorney. She is the current attorney general of Massachusetts and former president of the Boston City Council. Campbell died of a sudden sickness when his daughter was 19.

== Personal life of Arnold Campbell ==
As of 2012, Arnold Campbell was retired and living in Arizona, where his daughter also was living.
