= Amos Adams =

Anglican clergy

- Born: September 1, 1728; Roxbury, Boston
- Died: October 5, 1775 (aged 47); Dorchester, Massachusetts
- Education: Harvard University
- Occupations: preacher and minister

Amos Adams (September 1, 1728 – October 5, 1775) was a preacher, and minister of the first church in Roxbury, Massachusetts.

== Life ==
He graduated from Harvard University in 1752. He was ordained as successor to Mr. Peabody September 12, 1753, and died at Dorchester on October 5, 1775, at age 48, of dysentery, which prevailed in the camp at Cambridge and Roxbury. His son, Thomas Adams, was ordained in Boston as minister for Camden, South Carolina, where, after a residence of 8 years, he died August 16, 1797.

Adams in early life devoted himself to religious service, and he continued his labors as a preacher of the gospel with unabating vigor till his death. He was fervent in devotion, and his discourses, always animated by a lively and expressive action, were remarkably calculated to warm the hearts of the audience. He was steadfast in his principles and unwearied in industry.

He published the following sermons; on the death of Lucy Dudley, 1756; at the artillery election, 1759; on a general thanksgiving for the reduction of Quebec, 1759; on the ordination of Samuel Kingsbury, Edgartown, November 25, 1761; at the ordination of John Wyeth, Gloucester, February 5, 1766; the only hope and refuge of sinners, 1767; two discourses on religious liberty, 1767; a concise and historical view of New England in two discourses; on the general fast April 6, 1769, which was republished in London 1770; sermons at the ordination of Jonathan Moore, Rochester, September 25, 1768, and of Caleb Prentice, Reading, October 25, 1769. he died of infection on October 5 1775

He preached the Dudleian lecture of Harvard college in 1770, Diocesan Episcopacy, as Founded on the Supposed Episcopacy of Timothy and Titus, Subverted. This work is a specimen of the earning (i.e. worth, capability) of the writer. It is lodged in manuscript in the library of the college.
