= TechBoston Academy =

Location
- 9 Peacevale Road; Dorchester, Massachusetts 02124; United States
- 42°17′07″N 71°04′33″W

Information
- Founded: 2002
- School district: Boston Public Schools
- Headmaster: Patrick Cleary
- Athletics conference: Boston City League

Founded in 2002, TechBoston Academy (TBA) is a pilot school located in Dorchester, Massachusetts, United States that offers a college preparatory curriculum to students in grades 7–12. TBA immerses its 850 students to a wide span of technological resources such as laptops, Smartboards, PDAs, digital cameras, Google Workspace, and podcasting. TBA offers advanced courses that utilize this technology and cover topics such as digital art, Adobe graphic design applications, computer programming, and E-commerce.

== President Obama ==
On March 8, 2011, Barack Obama visited TechBoston to speak on winning the future through education. In his speech, President Obama stated:

“Every day, TechBoston is proving that no matter who you are, or what you look like, or where you come from, every child can learn. Every child can succeed. And every child deserves that chance.”

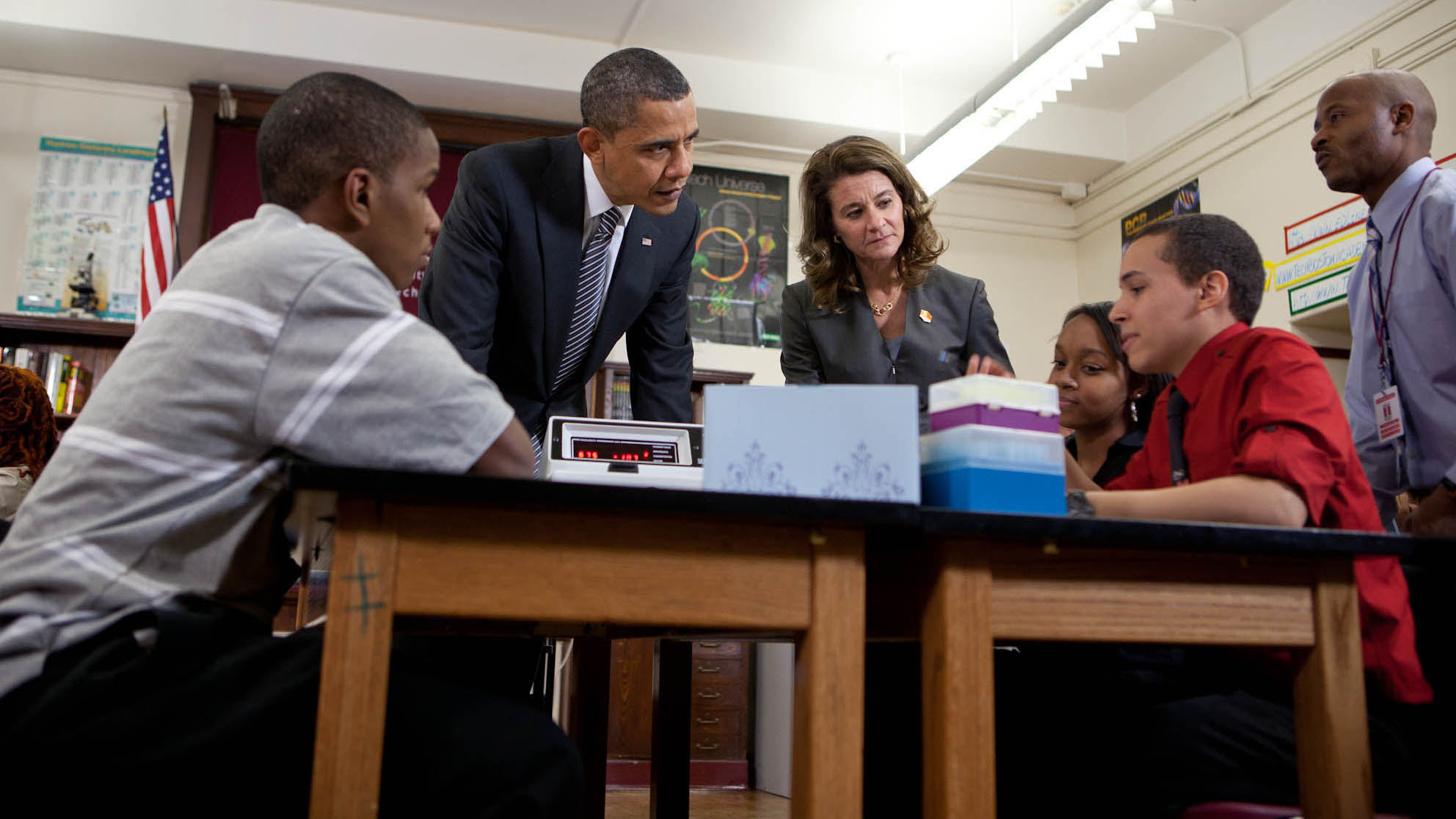
President Obama and Melinda Gates at TechBoston

== Ongoing Success ==
In 2006, 92% of the first graduating class went to college as compared to 63% of Boston Public School students. The 54 members of the class of 2006 received just over $1,000,000 in scholarships and financial aid. In 2010, 93% of the graduating class went to college as compared to 61% of Boston Public School students. The 66 members of the class of 2010 received over $2,000,000 in scholarships and financial aid.

In 2012, 100% of TechBoston Academy 10th grade students (tested) passed the English Language Arts MCAS, compared to the BPS district average of 95%. TBA 10th graders also scored higher than the BPS average in 2012 on both the Mathematics and Science/Tech MCAS exams. Ninety-two percent of graduating seniors in 2012 entered post-secondary education, with 66.7% attending four-year colleges.

== Student demographics ==
- 89.2% of students enrolled at TBA are either African American or Hispanic.
- 23% of students are classified as "students with disabilities."
- 22.9% of students are classified as "English language learners."

== Teachers ==
- There are approximately 97 teachers at TBA, 90% of which are licensed in teaching assignment.
- Student/Teacher Ratio: 10.2 to 1

== MCAS performance ==
- Approximately 82% of TBA students score proficient or higher on the MCAS English Language Arts section. .
- Approximately 62% of TBA students score proficient or higher on the MCAS Mathematics section.
- Approximately 37% of TBA students score proficient or higher on the MCAS Science & Technology section.
