= Johnny Martorano =

American hitman (born 1940)

- Born: December 13, 1940 (age 85); Somerville, Massachusetts, U.S.
- Other names: Vincent Joseph Rancourt, Richard Aucoin, Nick, The Cook, The Executioner, The Basin Street Butcher
- Occupation: Gangster
- Years active: 1964–1999
- Children: 5
- Parent(s): Angelo Martorano; Elizabeth Mary Hunt
- Relatives: James Martorano (brother)
- Status: Paroled/Released in 2007
- Allegiance: Winter Hill Gang
- Penalty: Sentenced to 12 years in prison

John Vincent Martorano (born December 13, 1940), also known as "Vincent Joseph Rancourt", "Richard Aucoin", "Nick", "the Cook", "the Executioner", "the Basin Street Butcher", is an American former mobster and hitman for the Winter Hill Gang in Boston, Massachusetts, who has admitted to 20 mob-related killings.

== Early life ==
John Martorano was born in Somerville, Massachusetts, in 1940. He is the older brother of James "Jimmie" Martorano by eleven months. His father, Angelo "Andy" Martorano was an immigrant from Riesi, Sicily, and with his family he emigrated to the United States around 1915, to East Boston. His mother, Elizabeth Mary "Bess" Hunt, was of English and Irish descent, who lived in Somerville. Martorano was raised Catholic and served as an altar boy.

The Martorano family moved to the Irish enclave of East Milton. Martorano and his brother attended St Agatha's parochial grammar school in Milton through grade 8, where Martorano was a classmate of future congressman Bill Delahunt. Martorano attended Mount Saint Charles Academy in Woonsocket, Rhode Island as a freshman while his brother remained in Milton, enrolling in Cunningham Junior High School. Later, in his freshman year, Martorano dropped out of Mount Saint Charles and joined Jimmie at Cunningham. During high school, he and Jimmie were standout football players, and were elected co-captains of the team for their senior season in 1958. Although recruited by several college teams, Martorano did not continue his education beyond his graduation from Milton High.

In a 60 Minutes interview with Steve Kroft, Martorano claimed that when he was young his father told him, "You're the oldest son and this is your heritage" (referring to his father's connections to organized crime). "You've got to take care of your family and be a man."

== Criminal career ==
After graduating from high school, Martorano turned down seven football scholarships and instead stayed in Boston. Hanging out in the Combat Zone, Martorano fell under the guidance of Stephen Flemmi, and by the age of 25 was an active mobster. He committed his first murder at 24, when he allegedly killed Patriarca crime family made man Robert S. Palladino, who was going to testify in a case involving the murder of prostitute Barbara Sylvester in his father's restaurant.

Ralph DeMasi, a Boston mobster incarcerated in White Deer Township, Pennsylvania, later wrote to the courts that when he was driving down Morrissey Boulevard with fellow Irish mobster William (Billy) O'Brien in 1964, Martorano pulled up in a car alongside them and gunned down O'Brien, shooting him seventeen times with a machine gun and wounding DeMasi. In his letter about the events that almost led to his death he wrote, "I thought someone was taking target practice at us. It was my good friend John Martorano."

Martorano rapidly became one of the Winter Hill Gang's most prolific enforcers under the tenures of Howie Winter and Whitey Bulger. In January 1968, after Hubert "Smitty" Smith, an African-American man, helped mobsters Rocco Lammattina and John Cincotti beat up Flemmi in an after-hours saloon, Martorano confronted Smith at the saloon the next night. Despite his ignorance of the circumstances behind Flemmi's beating, Martorano challenged Smith and questioned him about the altercation between Lammattina and Cincotti versus Flemmi. When recounting Smith's responses, Martorano said, "He (Smith) kept giving me the wrong answers. He didn't give me any respect. All he had to say was 'I didn't know he was your friend, I'm sorry.' That's all he needed to say." After Smith did not answer Martorano's challenge satisfactorily, Martorano tracked Smith to a car on Normandy Street in Dorchester. Smith was accompanied by a 19-year-old woman, Elizabeth Frances "Liz" Dickson, and a 17-year-old boy, Douglas Barrett. Martorano walked up to the car and killed all three occupants with his .38-caliber snubnosed revolver.

On March 8, 1973, Martorano machine gunned 30-year-old bartender Michael Milano to death as he was driving in the Brighton neighborhood of Boston after mistaking Milano for a rival gang leader, Al Notarangeli. Milano drove a Mercedes-Benz similar to Notarangeli's and wore a fur coat like the one Notarangeli wore. Milano's friend, Louis Lapiana, and Lapiana's girlfriend, Dianne Sussman, were wounded in the shooting. Lapiana was left paralyzed until his death in 2001. The Winter Hill Gang held a fundraiser for Lapiana at Chandler's bar after the shooting without disclosing to him that it was them who had shot him.

The Winter Hill Gang made a second attempt on Notarangeli's life on March 19, 1973 after they were tipped that their target was at a restaurant on Boston's waterfront. After following a car in which they mistakenly thought Notarangeli was traveling, Martorano and Howie Winter opening fire on the occupants of the vehicle in an attack coordinated by other gang members in a "radio car" using walkie-talkies. The driver, Albert Plummer, was killed and two passengers, Frank Capizzi and Hugh "Sonny" Shields, were critically wounded.

In 1979, Flemmi and Bulger learned that Martorano and several other Winter Hill members, including James "Gentleman Jim" Mulvey, 'Volkswagon' Dwight Taylor, and Victor 'The Vulture' Vitale, were about to be indicted for a horse race-fixing scheme involving "Fat" Tony Ciulla. They warned Martorano, who quickly fled to Florida. He spent the next 16 years as a fugitive, although he was frequently called on to take part in murders. Along with Winter Hill member Joe McDonald, he was the triggerman for the hits on Roger Wheeler and John Callahan. Martorano initially objected to having Callahan killed but was eventually convinced by Bulger and Flemmi. While on the run in Florida, Martorano fathered a son, James Stephen, who was named after Bulger and Flemmi, with his girlfriend Patricia Lytle.

Martorano was arrested in Boca Raton, Florida in January 1995 after Flemmi tipped the FBI off to his whereabouts. Martorano was charged, along with Flemmi and two Boston mafiosi, on a massive racketeering indictment; however, he abruptly agreed to a plea bargain deal in 1999. He was angered that Bulger, Taylor, Vitale, and Flemmi made no effort to keep him out of the 1979 race-fixing indictment, but had persuaded FBI agent John Connolly to ensure they would not be indicted. More seriously, Bulger and Flemmi tipped off authorities about Martorano's whereabouts. In return for confessing his murders, Martorano received a reduced prison sentence of 12 years. In 2007, he was released from prison and given $20,000 to start a new life. Martorano turned down an offer to enter the witness protection program and was still living in the Boston area as of 2008.

=== Murder victims of John Martorano ===
- Alfredo "Indian Al" Angeli
- John Banno
- Douglas Barrett
- John Callahan
- Richard Castucci
- Elizabeth Frances "Liz" Dickson
- Ronald Hicks (Martorano confessed to a federal prosecutor that he killed Hicks to prevent him from testifying against the Campbell brothers and Dennis W. Chandler in their trial for the triple-murder of Guido St. Laurent, Carnell Eaton, and Harold King)
- John Jackson
- Thomas "Tommy" King
- Michael Milano
- Joseph J. "Indian Joe" Notarangeli
- William L. "Billy" O'Brien
- James "Spike" O'Toole
- Robert Palladino
- Albert Plummer
- Herbert "Smitty" Smith
- James Sousa
- Anthony Veranis
- Roger Wheeler

== 60 Minutes interview ==
On January 15, 2008, Martorano was interviewed by Steve Kroft on the CBS News television program 60 Minutes. Initially, Martorano had agreed to be interviewed by Ed Bradley, a former Mount Saint Charles Academy classmate, but Bradley died before this could occur. During the interview, Martorano expressed remorse for having killed Elizabeth Dickson, the woman in the car in Dorchester. In the interview, Martorano told Kroft, "I might be a vigilante, but not a serial killer. Serial killers, you have to stop them. They'll never stop, they enjoy it. I never enjoyed it. I don't enjoy risking my life but if the cause was right, I would."

== Whitey Bulger trial ==
In June 2013, Martorano testified as a prosecution witness in Whitey Bulger's trial in Boston, Massachusetts.

== Personal life ==
Martorano was married to Carolyn Wood, an Irish-American, with whom he fathered five children, including Vincent, John Jr. and Jeannie Martorano. Carolyn divorced him in 1975, after twelve years of marriage.

== In popular culture ==
In the Whitey Bulger biopic Black Mass (2015), Martorano is portrayed by W. Earl Brown.
