= Guido St. Laurent =

American community organizer

Guido St. Laurent (c.1930–November 13, 1968) was an American community organizer, who in the 1960s founded and led N.E.G.R.O., an African American community organization based in the Roxbury neighborhood of Boston that provided services to the local Black community and played a role in Civil Rights movement advocacy for Boston's Black community.

After losing his eyesight in an accident in 1960 while serving a prison sentence, St. Laurent found new purpose in his life and focused on community organizing and Black activism. St. Laurent was killed at the age of 38 on November 13, 1968, in a triple homicide at N.E.G.R.O's offices. While three suspects were tried for the murders, a key witness was killed before the trial, and the three suspects were acquitted.

== Early life ==
St. Laurent was raised in the Roxbury neighborhood of Boston, Massachusetts. His mother was Mercedes St. Laurent. He spent much of his first thirty years of life frequently law-breaking and running into trouble with law enforcement. He also found occasional work creating visual art.

St. Laurent made a change of course in his life after serving a sentence at MCI-Walpole. During this sentence, an accident blinded his vision in 1960. While it initially posed a great challenge to him, St. Laurent would later regard his blindness to have been a positive occurrence in his life, considering it a turning-point for himself. He believed that the circumstances challenged him to begin thinking more constructively, and allowed him to change the course of his life. He was quoted as remarking, "It wasn't until I was blinded that I began to see."

== Community organizing work ==
After being released from prison, St. Laurent became a community organizer, founding the New England Grass Roots Organization (N.E.G.R.O.), a civil rights group. In 1966, several years after leaving the prison, St. Laurent set up the group's headquarters in a Roxbury storefront on Blue Hill Avenue. Initially, the organization served to publicize positive news about the city's African American community. St. Laurent would contact news outlets to promote positive stories from the community. St. Laurent also worked to serve as a mediator between various groups within the community. As it grew, organization began providing services to Roxbury residents and became an important resource for many residents. The organization offered members of the African-American community assistance with self-help. Its Blue Avenue office was open at all-hours daily, with St. Laurent spending a great amount of time there.

St. Laurent promoted Black pride, believing in the message "black is beautiful". He embraced his Black identify by wearing natural hairstyles, and occasionally wearing traditional African clothing. However, he also highlighted the importance of looking beyond race, often joking in response to conversation about the differences between White and Black people, "when you're blind, you know [skin color] doesn't matter."

After 1967 riots in Roxbury, St. Laurent established a citizens band radio network in Roxbury for a youth patrol that had formed to act as a neighborhood security group. In April 1868, the Boston Police Department credited the efforts of this patrol with preventing serious riots from occurring in Roxbury in the aftermath of news of the assassination of Martin Luther King Jr.

Prior to St. Laurent's death, the N.E.G.R.O had formed plans with the Joint Center for Urban Studies to launch a community television series involving the Black community. He also had interest in involving N.E.R.G.O. with starting a performing arts program. St. Laurent had aspirations of expanding his organization nationwide, opening offices in black communities of other American locales.

In light of the success St. Laurent had in public relations, he was hired by a black-run printing firm established by AVCO to run public relations.

St. Laurent also came to work at Woolman Systems. Woolman Systems was, at the time, a significant sub-contractor of a new nearly $2 million program to provide employment to the chronically unemployed as part of the Roxbury-Dorchester-South End Greater Boston Consortium that was implementing a job training program in Boston. Along with Carnell Eaton and others, St. Laurent served on the consortium. Per testimony by Frederick B. Rose for the prosecution in the 1969 murder trial subsequent to St. Laurent's murder, in addition to the N.E.G.R.O. nonprofit, St. Laurent operated a for-profit firm called Public Relations Organization (PRO) and had hopes of this firm receiving $147,000 from the consortium for work in advertising and public relations. Rose testified that in addition to St. Laurent, St. Laurent's wife as well as Rose and his own wife were the incorporators of this firm.

== Murder ==
On November 13, 1968, at N.E.G.R.O's organization's office on Blue Hill Avenue in Roxbury, St. Laurent was murdered in a gun attack. Also killed were fellow N.E.G.R.O organization leader Carnell Eaton, and Harold King. King had been an out-of-town visitor from Cleveland, and was likely not a target of the attack. Surviving the attack was Ronald Hicks and Frederick B. Rose. St. Laurent was 38 years of age when he died. Surviving the attack was St. Laurent's guide dog, Russ (a German Shepherd). St. Laurent's adult son, David, took custody of Russ after the murders.

300 attended St. Laurent's funeral service held on November 15, 1968. Many civic leaders and civil rights activists attended his funeral, such as United Front leader Chuck Turner and Urban League President Harry Elan. Reverend James Breeden delivered a eulogy which hailed St. Laurent as a man of peace.

In December 1968, the Boston FBI office contemplated planting a news story in the Boston Herald Traveler casting negative aspersions on the personal background of St. Laurent, in hopes that, the "article could urge the black community to take over existing civil rights groups and run them for the benefit of the community". However, the FBI opted against planting this story.

=== 1969 trial and acquittal of Campbell brothers and Dennis W. Chandler for murder ===
After the triple murders, law enforcement was soon directed to survivor Ronald Hicks (a pimp) to investigate the "Campbell brothers" (Alvin and Albert Campbell) and Dennis W. Chandler as suspects. Hicks assigned the potential motive of a dispute over the federal funds that were being provided to Woolman Systems. In March 1969 (two months before the trial), Hicks, who was the prosecution's main witness, was shot to death. It is believed that Johnny Martorano perpetrated this murder and had done so in order to prevent Hicks from testifying against the Campbell brothers. The Campbell brothers had been working as salaried employees at the Boston operation of the New York City-based firm Woolman Systems. Also working at this firm were murder victims St. Laurent and Harold King. described as specializing, "in work in ghettos with the federal government". At the time of the murders, Alvin Campbell had just started working as the project director for an automative training center operated by the firm and Arnold Campbell had just become the automotive centers director of training. Alleged accomplice Dennis W. Chandler worked as the night watchman at the automotive training center.

On charges that included first degree homicide, the three men were tried in the Suffolk County Superior Court. The trial lasted three weeks. The trial had an all-white jury (formed by a week-long jury selection), while all three defendants were black.

In the case presented against the three men, the prosecution alleged that they had committed the murder and assault with intent to murder with their alleged motive being a dispute over federal money that had been provided for the purposes of providing job training to chronically unemployed Roxbury residents.

The defense, among other things, pointed out that one of the guns that was used to commit the murders was later found three days after the murders in the possession Ronald Randolph, a man that was shot and killed during a police chase. The state had chosen not to put forth any theories of how the gun came into the possession of Randolph. A photo was also displayed by the defense that placed Randolph at the murder scene the night of the killings. However, a photo was shown to Frederick B. Rose, who had survived the shooting, who testified that he was certain that Randolph was not one of the men involved in the attack. A witness who knew the defendants testified for the defense that he saw five men flee the N.E.G.R.O headquarters on the night the murders were committed, and that he was confident that those men were not the defendants. Additionally, the wives of each Campbell brothers and the girlfriend of Chandler corroborated alibis that they had been with their respective partners the night that the murders occurred.

In June 1969, the three men were acquitted.

== Family ==
At the time of his death, St. Laurent was married to Sandra Lee St. Laurent (née Sandra Lee Guss), who was also blind. The two had met at a training school for those with blindness they both attended in New Jersey. Sandra was originally from San Antonio, Texas. After leaving the school, they had initially maintained communication by exchanging braille correspondence with each-other. The two were wed in 1965 in a ceremony held at a residence in Boston's Dorchester neighborhood, accompanied by their guide dogs Russ (St. Laurent's, a German Shepherd) and Iras (Sandra's, a collie). Since Sandra was White, their union was an interracial marriage.

St. Laurent and his wife Sandra had two children together a girl (who was 3 years old at the time of St. Laurent's death) a boy (who was 1 years old at the time of St. Laurent's death). He also had a son from a previous marriage, David (who was 18 years old at the time of St. Laurent's death).
