= Roxbury Charter High Public School =

Location
- 18 Hulbert Street; Roxbury, Massachusetts; United States; 42°19′24.6″N 71°05′18″W

Information
- Type: Charter
- Established: 2003
- Closed: 2006
- Website: www.roxburycharterhigh.org

Roxbury Charter High Public School was a secondary school located in Roxbury, Massachusetts, United States. The school first opened in 2003. It closed in 2006.
