= Charlene Carroll =

Boston hairstylist

- Born: 1950 (age 74–75); Roxbury, Massachusetts, U.S.

Charlene Carroll (born 1950) is a Boston-area hairstylist, known for popularizing the wrap technique, a protective hairstyle, in the 1970s to protect her own hair from moisture and frizz. Born in Roxbury in 1950, her hairstyling career began in the early 1970's at Olive's Hair Salon. She opened her own salon, Charlene's Hair Salon, in 1977, which was open until 2015. In 2023, she was recognized as one of "Boston’s most admired, beloved, and successful Black Women leaders" by the Black Women Lead project.
