= Boston Public Library, Roxbury Branch =

Shaw-Roxbury Branch
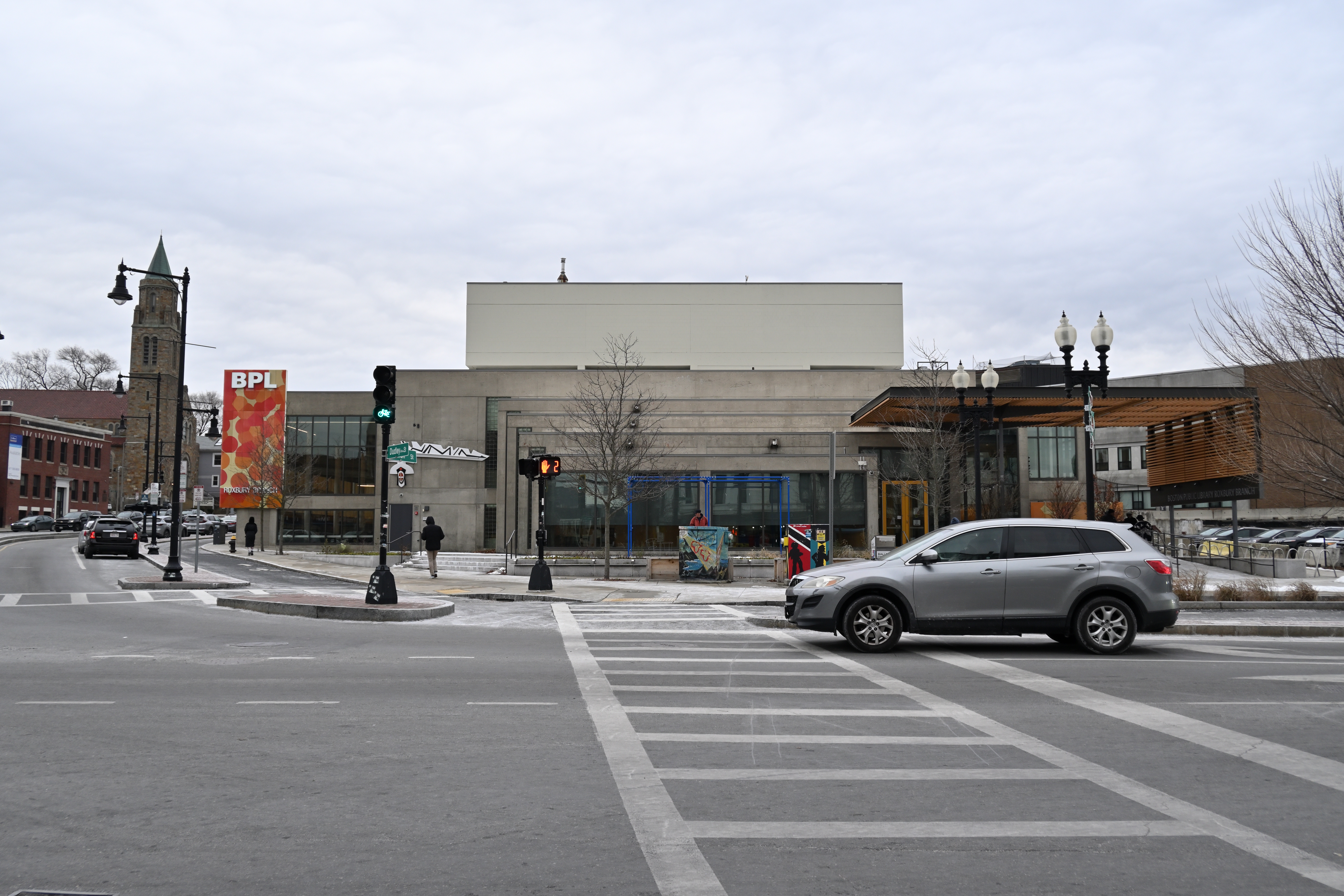
- Interactive map of the Shaw-Roxbury Branch area

General information
- Type: Library
- Location: 149 Dudley Street, Roxbury, MA 02119, Boston, Massachusetts, US
- Coordinates: 42°19′41.6″N 71°5′1.34″W
- Opened: 1978
- Renovated: 2019
- Cost: $12,876,000
- Owner: City of Boston Public Facilities Department and the Boston Public Library

Technical details
- Floor count: 2
- Floor area: 27,350 sq ft (2,541 m^{2})

Design and construction
- Architecture firm: Utile, Inc
- Structural engineer: RSE
- Civil engineer: Samiotes Consultants, Inc. and BSC Group

Website
- www.bpl.org/locations/roxbury

The Shaw-Roxbury Branch of the Boston Public Library, formerly called the Roxbury Branch of the Boston Public Library and the Dudley Library, is a 27,350-square-foot (2,541 m^{2}) library building located at 149 Dudley St, Boston, Massachusetts, in historic Nubian Square. The Shaw-Roxbury Branch is the largest in the Boston Public Library (BPL) system, excluding the central library location. The building was renovated in 2019 and reopened in 2020. In 2022, the library won an AIA COTE Top Ten Award.

In 2025, Mayor Michelle Wu announced that the branch would be renamed the Shaw-Roxbury Branch of the Boston Public Library after Sarah-Ann Shaw, Boston’s first Black woman TV reporter.

== History ==
The original Dudley Library was built in 1978 and designed by Kallman and McKinnell Architects. The building was constructed using Brutalist architecture, featuring heavy use of exposed structural concrete elements. The walls were constructed with concrete and glass blocks. The original building was considered to be in isolation with the remainder of the Dudley (now Nubian) Square neighborhood, as the only Brutalist structure in the area and a distinct lack of exterior features. The entrance had low visibility, and the building severely lacked natural light.

The renovation, which began in 2019, was the result of many years of BPL branch assessments. Among many other conclusions, the BPL observed a detachment from the community and a facility that "did not meet the needs of modern library-goers," per BPL President David Leonard, as reasons to move forward with the renovation. The new library set out to provide a more open, inviting experience to the public and increase its relevance as a community meeting spot and workplace. The renovation was designed by architecture firm Utile, Inc. and cost approximately $13 million to $17 million.

The branch was renamed the Shaw-Roxbury branch of the Boston Public Library in 2025 in honor of Sarah-Ann Shaw, Boston's first Black woman TV reporter.

== Design ==
Leonard, along with extensive input from Nubian Square locals and Roxbury residents in general, observed that the best philosophy for the future of the library was to create more light and warmth in the building. He also wanted improved visibility to the community and modern amenities consistent with other meeting places. Original concrete and glass block walls were replaced in large quantities with transparent windows, representing an opposite approach from the preceding Brutalist style. The entrance, which was criticized for being small and uninviting, was moved to Dudley Street. The new entrance is also directly adjacent to the Nubian Square MBTA station. The surrounding plaza was also reinvented as an attempt to engage more with the neighborhood, with a new welcome area which overlooks it.

Another point of emphasis within the upgrade was to improve the experience for patrons of all ages. This includes a corner dedicated to children, as well as the following features:

- African-American collection space
- Nutrition lab
- Learning lab
- Community room with state-of-the-art technology
- Computer workspaces

The library also received upgrades to insulation, its roof, HVAC, and lighting to improve performance and minimize carbon footprint. The most effective component is a wood veneer curtain wall system for the exterior, which provides greater warmth than a comparable curtain wall with aluminum mullions. In addition, the wood curtain walls provide greater energy savings over the previous envelope.

An on-site rainwater retention system was constructed to retain the first one inch of rainfall, which is directed towards vegetation and on-site irrigation.

== Influence ==
Per Leonard, "all the special elements of this branch – the nutrition lab, the dedicated space for the African American collection, the tech classroom, and the return of public art and new art projects – are a direct response to so many people who had a voice during the community process."

One example of a community-focused public art project is a series of murals in the interior, dubbed the R-O-X-B-U-R-Y Project. Installed in January 2022, the murals are a collaboration from artist Joe Wardwell, poet Nakia Hill, and 826 Boston's Youth Literary Advisory Board. The murals, three in total, feature poetry layered over backdrops of different landscapes in Roxbury.

The goal of the library upgrades is to also preserve the legacy of Black culture in the area, where it will serve as "the archival home for collections of African-American texts, because the Roxbury Branch has been a significant reservoir for these works in Boston," per Paris Jefferies, executive director at King Boston (a local nonprofit to commemorate Martin Luther King Jr.).

The project won a Sustainable Design Award from the Boston Society of Architects in 2021.
