= Hibernian Hall (Boston, Massachusetts) =

- U.S. National Register of Historic Places
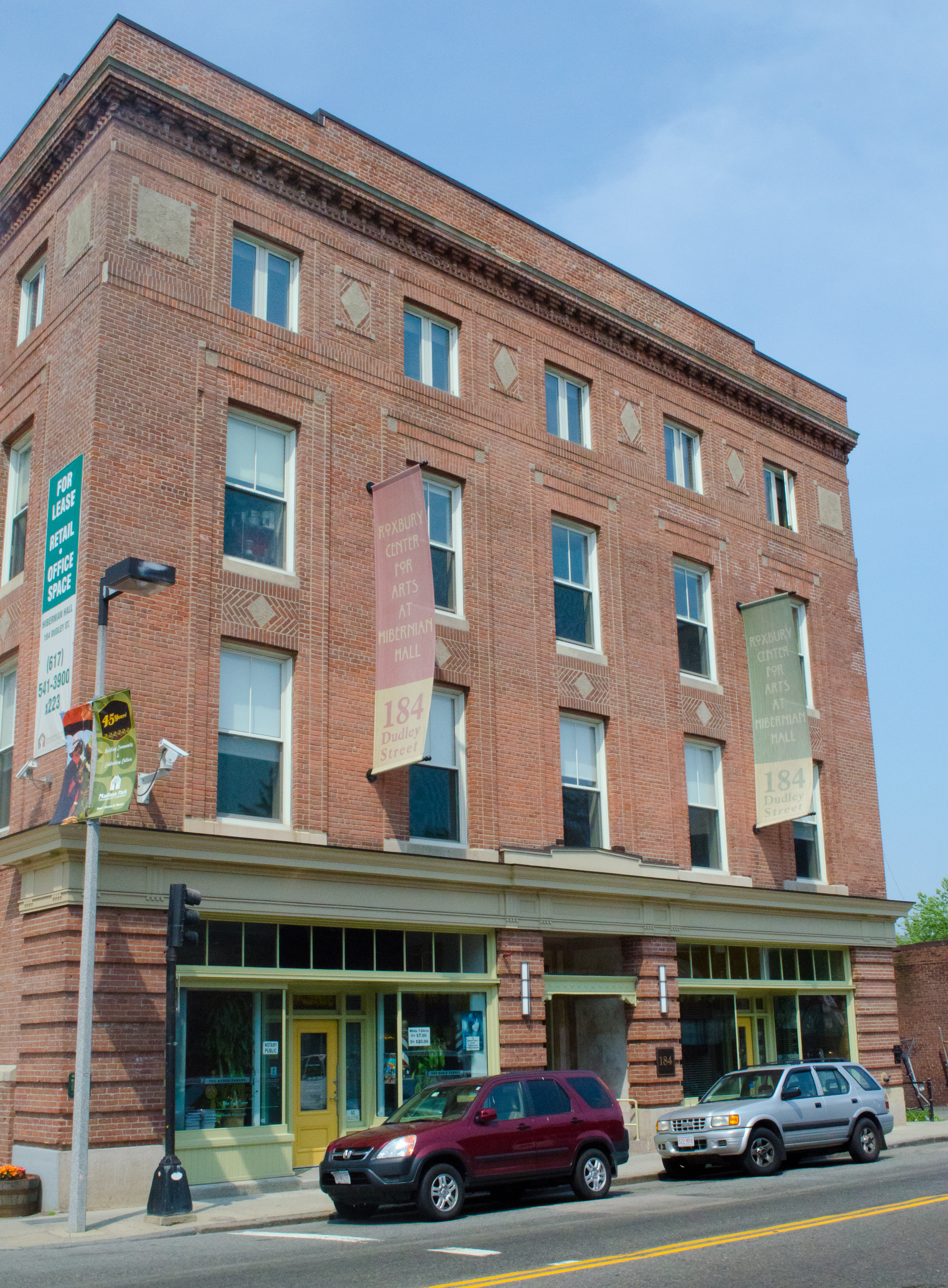

- Location within Massachusetts Location within the United States
- Location: Boston, Massachusetts
- Coordinates: 42°19′43″N 71°4′57″W
- Built: 1913
- Architect: Edward T.P. Graham, Joseph M. Dolan
- NRHP reference No.: 04000534
- Added to NRHP: June 2, 2004

The Hibernian Hall is a historic building at 182-186 Dudley Street in the Roxbury neighborhood of Boston, Massachusetts. The four story brick building was designed by Edward Thomas Patrick Graham, and built in 1913 for the Ancient Order of Hibernians, an Irish Catholic fraternal organization. It was the first of several Hibernian halls to be built in Roxbury, it is now one of only two Irish dance halls from the period to survive. Its ground floor was originally occupied by storefronts, with offices of the organization and a banquet hall on the second floor, and a large hall (capacity 600) on the third floor, which included a fourth-floor balcony. It remained a gathering place for local Irish residents through the 1960s, and was taken by foreclosure in 1960. It was then taken over by a non-profit focused on job training for local African Americans, which operated there until 1989. The building interior has suffered due to neglect and vandalism, but the basic form of the upper concert hall has survived.

Madison Park Development Corporation obtained the building in 2005, renovated and reopened it in 2005. The grand ballroom, which sits 250 people, serves the community as the Roxbury Center for Arts at Hibernian Hall, a venue for theater, concerts, dances, visual art fairs, film screenings, and private parties. The performance space is used by a variety of Boston-area groups, including Praxis Stage, Celebrity Series of Boston Neighborhood Arts,

The hall was listed on the National Register of Historic Places in 2004.

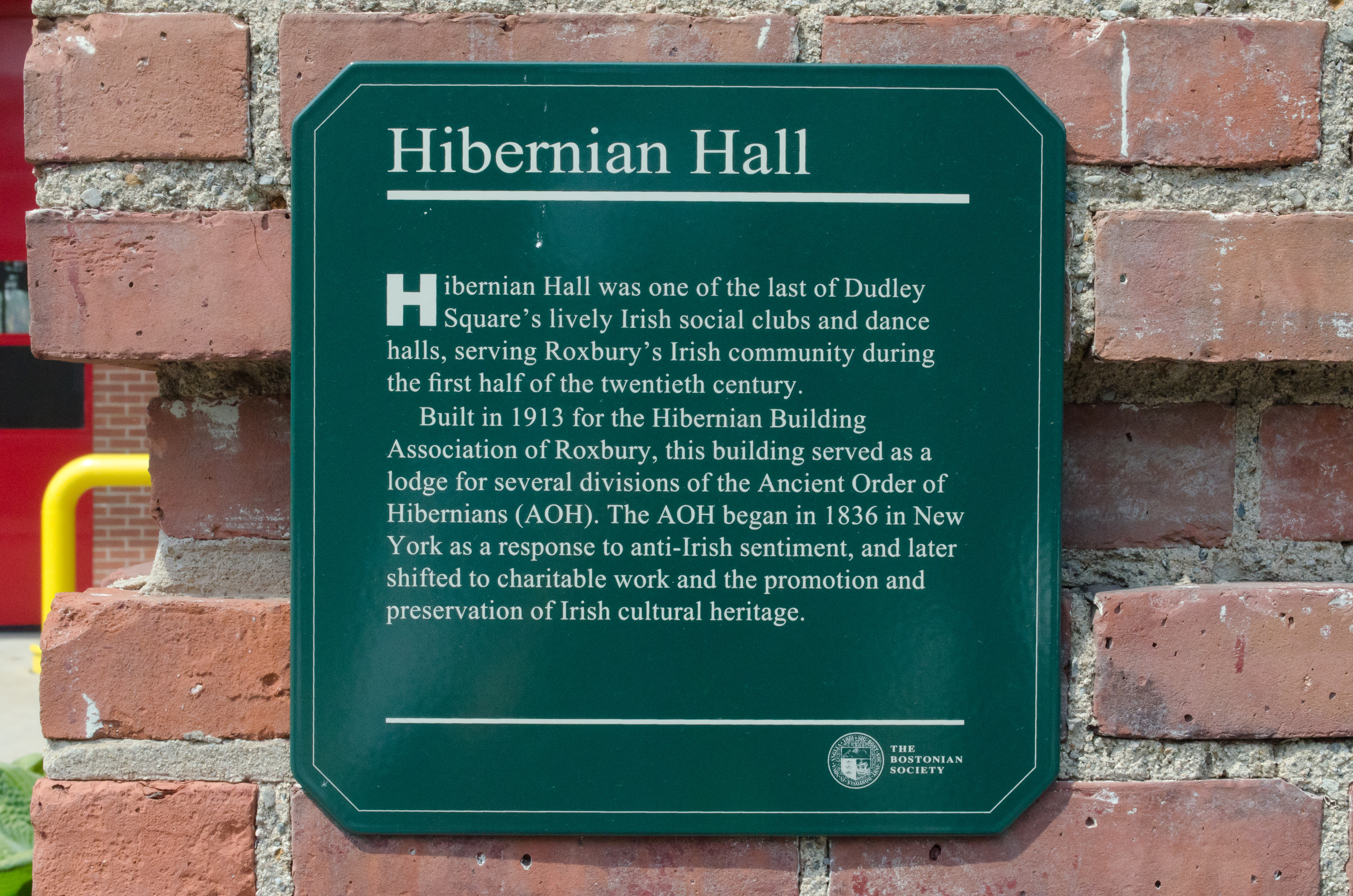
Plaque on the front of the building

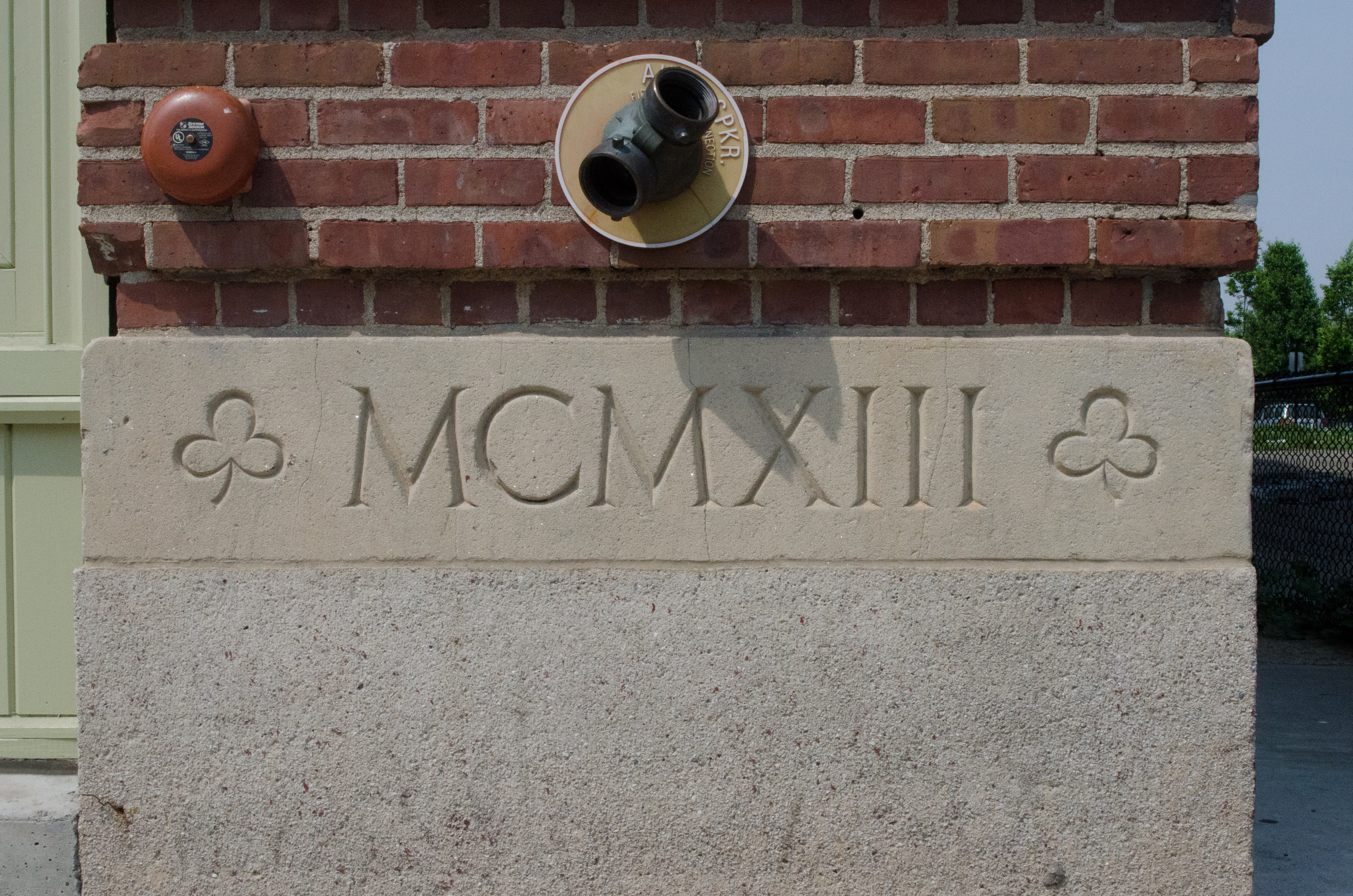
Building cornerstone

== See also ==
- National Register of Historic Places listings in southern Boston, Massachusetts
