= Roxbury, Boston =

Neighborhood of Boston, Massachusetts

Coordinates: 42°19′30″N 71°05′43″W

Roxbury
- Neighborhood of Boston
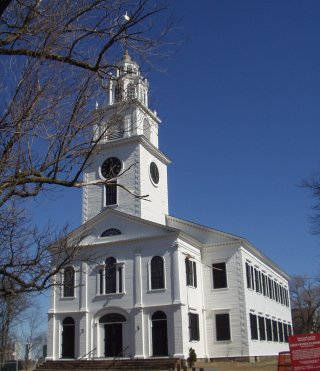
- First Church of Roxbury

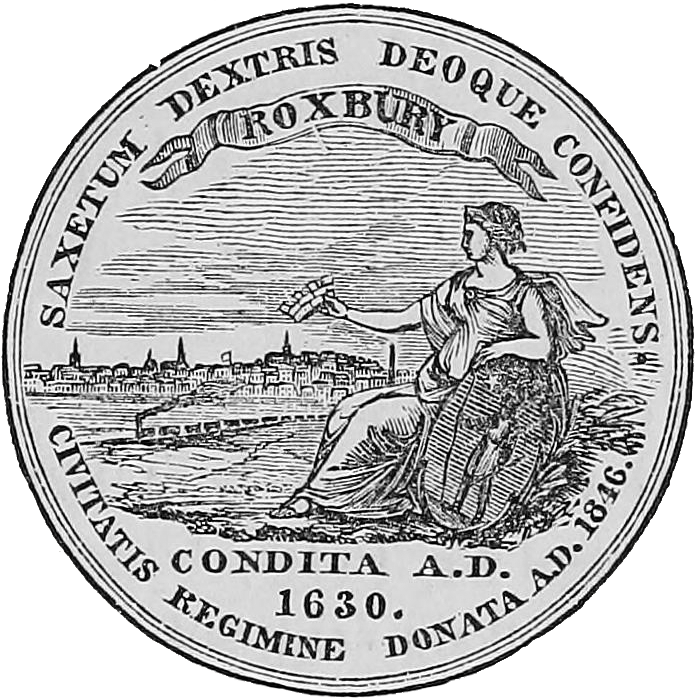
- Seal
- Motto: Saxetum Dextris Deoque Confidens (Latin) "[In this] rocky borough, by God's right, we are confident"
- Interactive map of Roxbury
- Settled: 28 September 1630
- Incorporated: 1630 Town 1846 City
- Annexed by Boston: 5 January 1868
- Time zone: Eastern
  - Summer (DST): Eastern
- Zip Code: 02119, 02121, 02118,02125
- Area code: 617 / 857

Roxbury (/ˈrɒksbəri/) is a neighborhood in Boston, Massachusetts, United States.

Roxbury is a dissolved municipality and one of 23 official neighborhoods of Boston used by the city for neighborhood services coordination. The city states that Roxbury serves as the "heart of Black culture in Boston." Roxbury was one of the first towns founded in the Massachusetts Bay Colony in 1630, and became a city in 1846 before being annexed to Boston on January 5, 1868. The original boundaries of the Town of Roxbury can be found in Drake's History of Roxbury and its noted Personages. Those boundaries include the modern day Longwood, Mission Hill, and Symphony neighborhoods, including the Christian Science Center, the Prudential Center (built on the old Roxbury Railroad Yards), and everything south and east of the Muddy River, including Symphony Hall, Northeastern University, Boston Latin School, Madison Park Technical Vocational High School, John D. O'Bryant School of Mathematics & Science, Roxbury Community College, YMCA, Harvard Medical School, and many hospitals and schools in the area. Franklin Park, once entirely within Roxbury when Jamaica Plain, West Roxbury and Roslindale were villages within the town of Roxbury until 1854, has been divided with the line between Jamaica Plain and Roxbury located in the vicinity of Peter Parley Road on Walnut Avenue, through the park to Columbia Road. Here, Walnut Avenue changes its name to Sigourney Street, indicating the area is now Jamaica Plain. One side of Columbia Road is Roxbury, the other Dorchester. Melnea Cass Boulevard is located approximately over the Roxbury Canal that brought boats into Roxbury, bypassing the busy port of Boston in the 1830s.

The neighborhood has also formed community gardens and developed the first urban farm of the city in accordance to the adoption of article 89, Urban Agricultural Ordinance, which provides framework for creating community resources for fresh produce, to be sold at low cost, and also to be donated to programs who help feed those who are in shelters or other care facilities alike. There are also many emergency response facilities who help underprivileged people in the area, such as youth centers, and social service centers.

When it was a separate municipality, Roxbury was in Suffolk County until it was added to the newly created Norfolk County in 1793; when it was incorporated into Boston, it returned to Suffolk County.

== Indigenous peoples ==
Before European colonization, the region around Roxbury was inhabited by the indigenous Massachusett. There were small Native communities throughout what became Roxbury, who probably moved between winter homes inland, where hunting was plentiful, and summer homes along the coast, where fishing and shellfish beds were plentiful. An erroneous statement in Francis Drake's History of Roxbury, that no Native people ever lived in the area, is refuted by Colonial documentation and archeological evidence found in several places, including the Arnold Arboretum and Jamaica Pond (formerly part of the town of Roxbury; today part of the Jamaica Plain neighborhood).

== European settlement in the 17th century ==
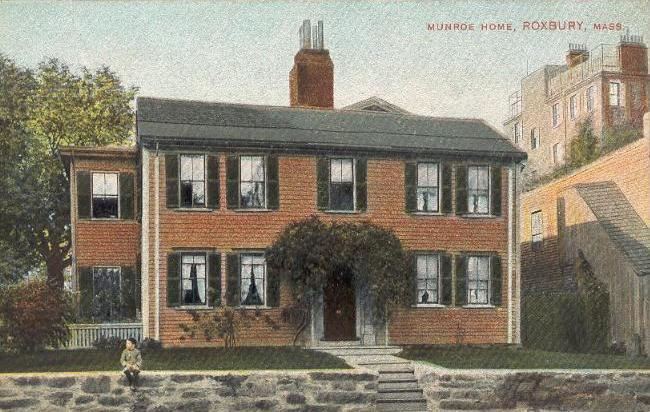
Munroe House, built in 1683, as seen in 1905

The Massachusetts Bay Colony founded a group of six towns, including Boston, Cambridge, and Roxbury. For more than 200 years, Roxbury also encompassed West Roxbury, Roslindale, and Jamaica Plain. Three miles south, the only land route to the capital led through Roxbury, which made the town important for both transportation and trade. Roxbury in the 1600s also held many of the resources that the Colonists prized: potentially arable land, timber, and a brook (source of water and water power), and stone for building. It is noted for its hilly geography and many large outcroppings of Roxbury Puddingstone, which was quarried for many years and used in the foundations of a large number of houses in the area. That particular stone exists only in the Boston basin; it is visible on stony outcroppings and used in buildings such as the Warren House, and it proved to be a valuable asset to the community that led to early prosperity. The village of Roxbury was originally called "Rocksberry" for the rocks in its soil that made early farming a challenge.

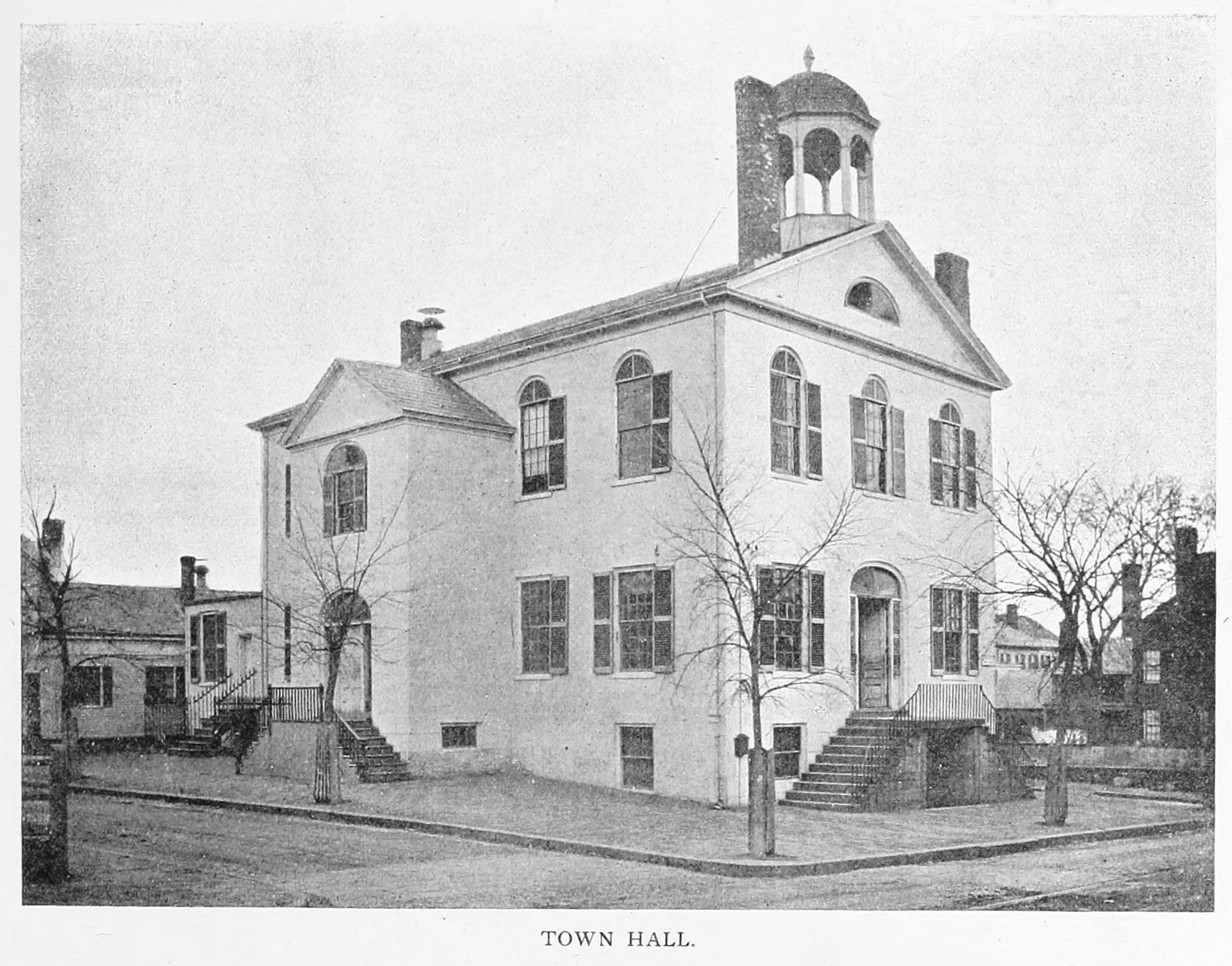
Roxbury Town Hall built in 1810, as seen in 1899

The settlers of Roxbury originally comprised the congregation of the First Church in Roxbury, established in 1632. During this time, the church served as a place of worship and as a meeting place for town government. The congregation had no time to raise a meeting house the first winter and so met with the neighboring congregation in Dorchester. One of the early leaders of this church was Amos Adams, and among the founders were Richard Dummer and his wife Mary. The first meeting house was built in 1632, and the building pictured here is the fifth meeting house, the oldest such wood-frame church in Boston. The Roxbury settlers, most prominently among them was Reverend John Eliot, played a role in Christianizing the native people and relocating them into Indian Praying Towns. The Massachuset leader Cutshamekin first resisted John Eliot's initial efforts to convert his tribe, but eventually swore allegiance to King James I as a means of survival.

Boston was previously connected to mainland Massachusetts by a narrow isthmus called Boston Neck or Roxbury Neck, and this was home to a number of early leaders of the colony, including original Massachusetts Bay Colony treasurer William Pynchon. Pynchon left Roxbury in 1636 with nearly one third its men to found Springfield, Massachusetts on far less rocky and more arable soil. Within a few decades, Roxbury residents developed prized apple orchards, and this led to another unique claim to fame: the Roxbury Russet apple, particularly suited for cider.

== Revolutionary War and following ==
The First Church of Roxbury was the starting point for William Dawes' "Midnight Ride" of April 18, 1775 (in a different direction from that of Paul Revere) to warn Lexington and Concord of the British raids at the opening of the American Revolutionary War. After the war, those able to afford it sought to live in free-standing, single-family houses away from their jobs in the city, and this led to Roxbury becoming one of the first American suburbs. Many homes were built in the Greek Revival style, symbolizing the republic of ancient Greece, a democracy that the young United States admired.

Trade was booming in the early 1800s in rum, salt, fish, and tobacco which brought in a horse-drawn carriage line across Boston Neck and down Washington Street, as well as the Boston to Providence, Rhode Island railroad in 1835. Many Irish immigrants flooded to Massachusetts to escape the Great Famine in the 1840s, and some families settled directly in Roxbury. St. Joseph's Catholic Church was the first Catholic Church with a predominantly Irish congregation, built in 1846. Some of the homes of these wealthy residents still stand today, such as the Edward Everett Hale House on Morley Street, the Alvah Kittredge Mansion on Linwood Street, the Spooner Lambert House on Dudley Street, Rockledge on Highland St., and Ionic Hall on Roxbury Street. Oakbend was the last mansion built in Roxbury in 1872; it now houses the National Center of Afro-American Artists. The neighborhood also contains an example of workers’ housing at Frederick Douglass Square Historic District (Greenwich, Warwick, and Sussex streets), brick houses built in the 1880s. As the need increased for more workers, old farms and estates were subdivided, and single family homes, row houses, and multi-family homes sprang up to accommodate the growing population with the advent of trolley service in 1887. One of these was Hibernian Hall, built in 1913, which is now the Roxbury Center of the Arts.

== 20th century ==
Many German immigrants also immigrated to the US in the early 1900s, quite possibly to escape the effects of the first World War. German immigrants also settled in the Mission Hill area (at that time part of Roxbury) and were instrumental in developing the many breweries that prospered along the Stony Brook until prohibition. In the early 20th century, a Jewish community was also established. Responding to the need for increased municipal services, the citizens of Roxbury voted to incorporate as a city in 1846, and later to become annexed to Boston in 1868. During the 1940s and 1950s, a major migration from the South to the northern cities led Roxbury towards becoming the center of the African American community in Boston. They were joined by immigrants from the Caribbean, especially Jamaica and Barbados and after World War II by southern blacks migrating north. During this population boom, city planners set aside land for Franklin Park—with 527 acres it is the largest park in Boston. Designed by landscape architect Frederick Law Olmsted, Franklin Park is the final jewel of the Emerald Necklace, the seven-mile stretch of public parkland that begins at Boston Common. Social issues and the resulting urban renewal activities of the 1960s and 1970s led to a decline in the neighborhood population (white flight).

In March 1965, an investigative study of property tax assessment practices published by the National Tax Association of 13,769 properties sold within the City of Boston under Mayor John F. Collins from January 1, 1960 to March 31, 1964 found that the assessed values in Roxbury in 1962 were at 68 percent of market values while the assessed values in West Roxbury were at 41 percent of market values, and the researchers could not find a nonracial explanation for the difference.

== Lower Roxbury ==
Lower Roxbury was once the name of the thriving area from Dudley Street to Tremont Street with bustling businesses up and down Ruggles Street. Around 1965, one side of Ruggles Street was small shops and the other side was decorated with tenement style and single family housing. At the corner of Douglas Square and Tremont Street was one notable shop called People's Market; the first supermarket in Boston located in a black area. In 1986, the Greater Roxbury Incorporation Project sought to create a 12.5 square-mile city that included the entirety of Roxbury and Mattapan as well as portions of Dorchester, Jamaica Plain, Fenway, Columbia Point and the South End that was to be called "Mandela" after Nelson Mandela. The organizers of the movement believed that the area would flourish if they could create their own government that would not discriminate against minorities. However, a 1988 referendum that would have examined the feasibility of reincorporation was defeated.

== Industry ==
In the 1600s, most people were farming or living off the land. In the 1700s mills and tanneries made up the main industry of Roxbury, but by the 1800s breweries, piano makers, iron foundries and rubber makers provided employment for a growing Roxbury population. By the turn of the 20th century, the area was a bustling mix of department stores, hotels, silent movie theaters, banks—even a bowling alley—designed by prominent Boston architects in a rich mixture of revival styles. As the marshes were filled in, factories and warehouses took their place. Nowadays, most spaces are used for office or retail stores since the community holds an emphasis on keeping jobs within the neighborhood and promoting jobs for youth.

== Urban policy ==
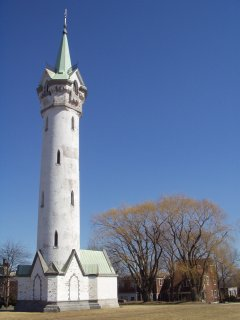
Fort Hill Tower (also known as the Cochituate Standpipe), designed by Nathaniel J. Bradlee and built in 1869 on the site of Revolutionary War fortifications

As Roxbury developed in the 19th century, the northern part became an industrial town with a large community of English, Irish, and German immigrants and their descendants, while the majority of the town remained agricultural and saw the development of some of the first streetcar suburbs in the United States. This led to the incorporation of the old Roxbury village as one of Massachusetts's first cities, and the rest of the town was established as the town of West Roxbury.

In the early 20th century, Roxbury became home to recent immigrants; a thriving Jewish community developed around Grove Hall, along Blue Hill Avenue, Seaver Street and into Dorchester along Columbia Road. A large Irish population also developed, with many activities centered around then-Dudley Square (now Nubian Square), which just before and following annexation into Boston, became a central location for Roxbury commerce. Following a massive migration from the South to northern cities in the 1940s and 1950s, Roxbury became the center of the African American community in Boston. The center of African American residential and social activities in Boston had formerly been on the north slope of Beacon Hill and the South End. In particular, a riot in response to the assassination of Martin Luther King Jr. resulted in stores on Blue Hill Avenue being looted and eventually burned down, leaving a desolate and abandoned landscape which discouraged commerce and business development. Frequent dumping and arson in the 1970s along the Dudley Street corridor also contributed to the neighborhood's decline.

In early April 1987, the original Orange Line MBTA route along Washington Street was closed and relocated to the Southwest Corridor (where the Southwest Expressway was supposed to be built a couple decades before). More recently, grassroots efforts by residents have been the force behind revitalizing historic areas and creating Roxbury Heritage State Park.

A movement known as the Greater Roxbury Incorporation Project, led by Roxbury residents Andrew Jones and Curtis Davis, sought to form an independent municipality out of the Roxbury and the Mattapan area. The project was part of a larger goal to increase the number of services available to residents, but in 1986 Boston Mayor Raymond Flynn rejected the idea. The area was to be named "Mandela" (after South African activist Nelson Mandela).

=== Southwest Corridor ===
The Boston Transportation Planning Review stimulated relocation of the Orange Line, and development of the Southwest Corridor Park spurred major investment, including Roxbury Community College at Roxbury Crossing and Ruggles Center at Columbus Avenue and Ruggles Street. Commercial development now promises reinvestment in the form of shopping and related consumer services. The Fort Hill section experienced significant gentrification when college students (many from Northeastern University and Wentworth Institute of Technology), artists, and young professionals moved into the area in the late 1990s and early 2000s. In the present day, there is much commercial and residential redevelopment. In 2014, a new tech-incubator called Smarter in the City launched its initiative to encourage growth in Roxbury by cultivating startups in then-Dudley Square.

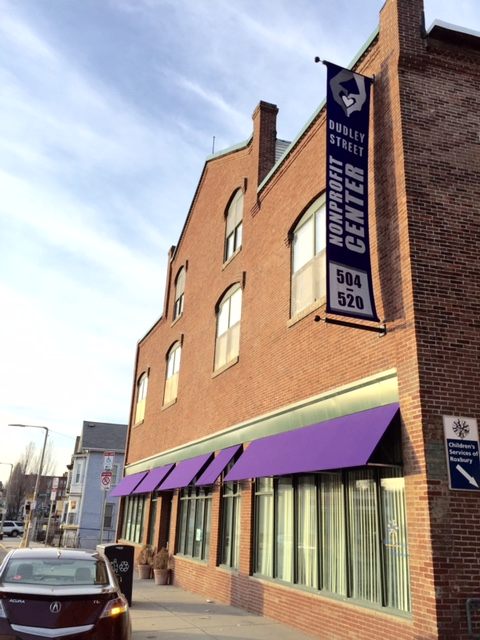
The building where the Dudley Street Neighborhood Initiative organization is located.

Currently the Boston Redevelopment Authority (BRA) has cited twelve projects approved for construction in the neighborhood of Roxbury. The BRA project in Dudley Square (now Nubian Square) calls for the demolition of a ten unit building on Hampden St. and the rehabilitation of two buildings. The final project will have 42 units available for affordable housing, with units ranging from one to four bedrooms. This construction of Dudley will revamp the look of the community. To improve the communities energy efficiency E+ buildings are beginning to develop in the neighborhoods of Boston. In April 2014, on Highland street the construction of the first E+ building in Roxbury was awarded the LEED platinum award. The building is part of the "Boston E+ Green Building Program" In 2013, the city of Boston accepted the urban agriculture ordinance, which is stated in article 89. The neighborhood of Roxbury is grounds for the first urban farm and is larger than 12,000 ft. The farm opened in July 2014. The DSNI is composed of thirty five board of directors. The board of directors are made up of 16 residents which are African American, Latino, Cape Verdean, and white, also there are 2 additional appointed residents, 4 youth representatives, 7 non-profit agencies, 2 churches, 2 businesses and 2 CDCs'. The DSNI has 225 housing units on their land trusts currently. The DSNI land trust allows for the sales of low-income housing. The sale of the homes remain for those with low-income as a result of the DSNI land trust housing units. In the next decade the DSNI plans to build 250 new homes in what is known as the Dudley Triangle. Roxbury is subject to article 80, a checklist for projects large and small to comply with people with disabilities. The article also includes, "improvements for pedestrian and vehicular circulation. ... new buildings and public spaces to be designed to enhance and preserve Boston's system of parks, squares, walkways, and active shopping streets, ensure that person with disabilities have full access ... afford such persons the educational, employment, and recreational opportunities available to all citizens ... and preserve and increase the supply of living space accessible to person with disabilities."

== Demographics ==
Historical population
Census	Pop.	Note	%±
1790	2,226		—
1820	4,135		—
1830	5,247		26.9%
1840	9,089		73.2%
1850	18,364		102.0%
1860	25,137		36.9%

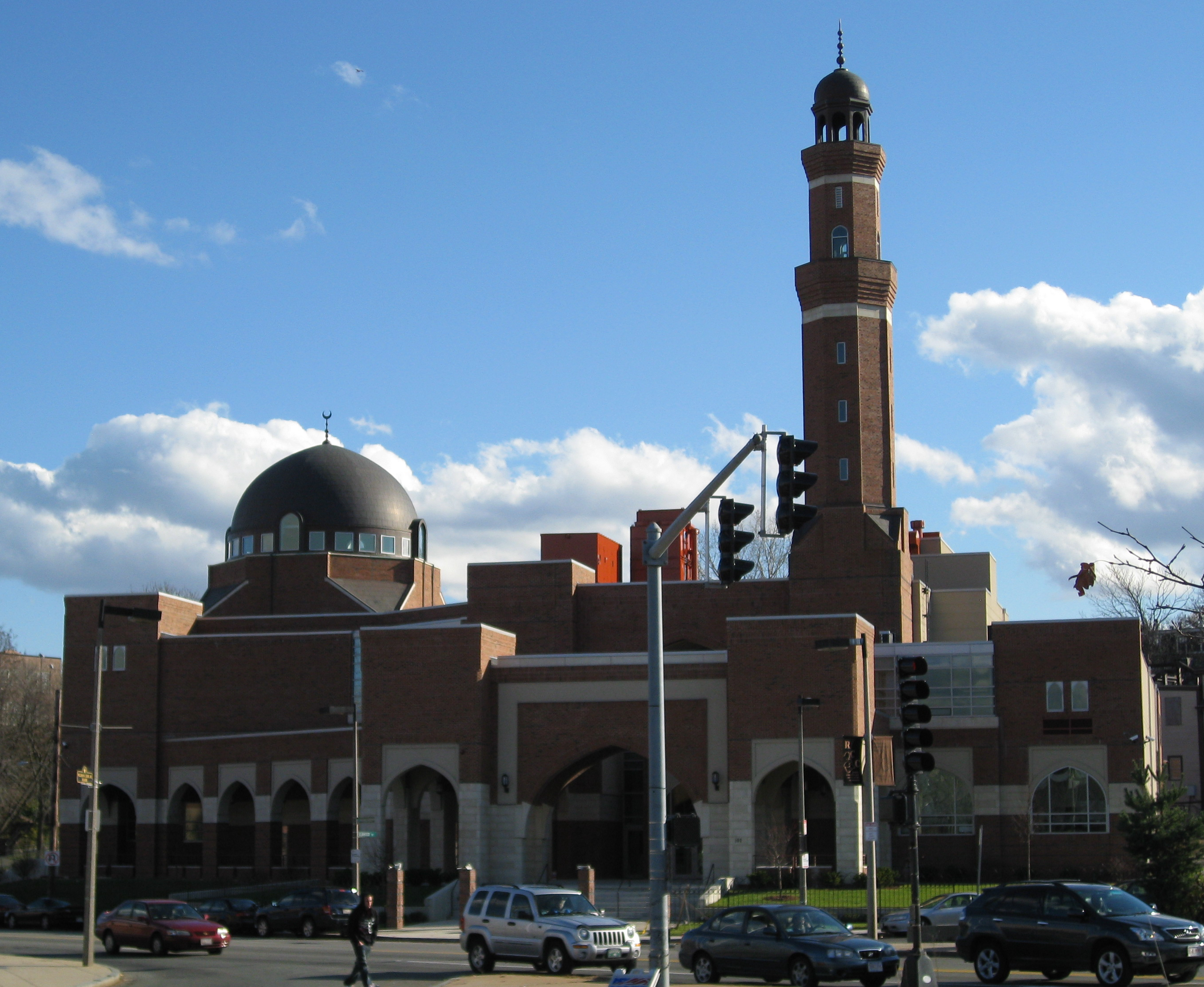
The Islamic Society of Boston Cultural Center is the largest mosque in Massachusetts.

"Today Roxbury is home to a diverse community which includes African American, Hispanic, and Asian families, along with young professionals". The neighborhood has a total population of 59,626 people as of 2016. According to an earlier survey, there are 21,116 males (46.1%) and 24,713 females (53.9%). Of the total population 33,182 (72.4%) are not Hispanic or Latino. White alone makes up 3,695 (8.1%) of the total population. There are 26,081 (56.9%) Black or African American people in the neighborhood of Roxbury. Asian alone is a total of 1,345 people (2.9%). Two or more races were reported by 1054 people (2.3%). Hispanic or Latino was reported by 12,647 people (27.6%). 6,523–14.2% reported being 60 years and older. Of the 45,829 surveyed 42,571 were over the age of five, the language spoken at home was recorded. Between the ages of 5 and 17 (8,898 – 20.9% of total population), 5,086 speak only English (57.2%), 2,508 (28.2%) speak Spanish. Between the ages of 18 and 64 (29,296 – 68.8% of total population) 17,040 (58.2%) speak only English. In this age group 7,440 (25.4%) speak Spanish, and 2,696 (9.2%) speak other European languages. Those surveyed who were 65 years and over (4,377 – 10.3% of total population) have 3,184 (72.7%) people that speak English at home, and 784 (17.9%) reported speaking Spanish at home. Only 74.9% of the population has made it past 8th grade. Educational attainment for the population 25 years and over was also surveyed. Of the 26,202, 5379 (20.5%) reported having earned a bachelor's degree or higher.

The population density is very high at 13,346 people per square mile, compared to Boston as a whole at 12,812 people per square mile. Roxbury is 4% more densely populated than Boston as a whole. The annual crime rate has gone down by 4% in 2016. The median household income is $34,616 and the unemployment rate is 8.9%. 1/4 of the Roxbury population was born in another country. 42% of the population is 25 years old or younger. Meanwhile, only 11% of the population are over the age of 65. 40% of the population drive to work, 36% take public transportation, 10% of the population walk to work, 10% bike to work, and 4% work from home. The average home in Roxbury is worth $380,000 .

== Housing ==
There are many housing resources in Roxbury, including government housing, shelters, different organizations and Domestic Violence resources. Emergency Shelter Commission mission is to help prevent and end homelessness and hunger through proactive planning, policy analysis, program development and advocacy with our city, state, federal and community partner agencies. The Boston Fair housing helps Boston residents purchase, improve, and keep their homes. They offer training and financial help to first time buyers. There are different organizations such as MASS housing, Section 8 waiting list, Action For Boston Community Development and Mass Access. Mass Housing provides more than $16 billion for financing housing for home buyers and homeowners. It will increase affordable housing for Massachusetts residents. Section 8 waiting list is a voucher program that opened in January 2003 in accordance with provisions contained in the United States Housing Act of 1937, as amended. Action for Boston Community Development provides basic services and programs to help individuals, families and communities of Boston to overcome poverty live with dignity and achieve to their full potential.

=== Project Bread, Food Project, and the Foodsource Hotline ===
Project Bread, located in East Boston, supports more than 400 community food programs in over 120 communities in Massachusetts. Funds raised throughout the year help support over 400 community food programs—soup kitchens, food pantries, food vouchers at health centers, subsidized CSA shares, community gardens, double-value farmers market coupons, etc.—in over 120 communities statewide in Massachusetts. This funding also targets the state's most vulnerable populations—children, working poor families, immigrants, and elders. They have much support from partners, donors, corporate sponsors, and individuals. The Food Project helps with growing produce to help serve the community in farmers markets as well as donations to hunger relief organizations. The Food Project program works with around 120 teenagers a year and also benefits from the help of volunteers. The BCYF (Boston Center for Youth and Families) The Foodsource Hotline is a toll-free hotline that responds to more than 46,000 calls a year from people across Massachusetts struggling to feed their families. FoodSource Hotline counselors refer callers to food resources in their community as well as provides them with information about school meals, summer meal sites for kids, elder meals programs, and the Supplemental Nutrition Assistance Program (SNAP), formerly known as food stamps. They will screen callers for eligibility for SNAP and help them with the application. Their goal is to help the caller find as many resources as possible to put good food on the table. When relevant, they also connect callers with utility, fuel assistance, and MassHealth. And all information is kept strictly confidential.

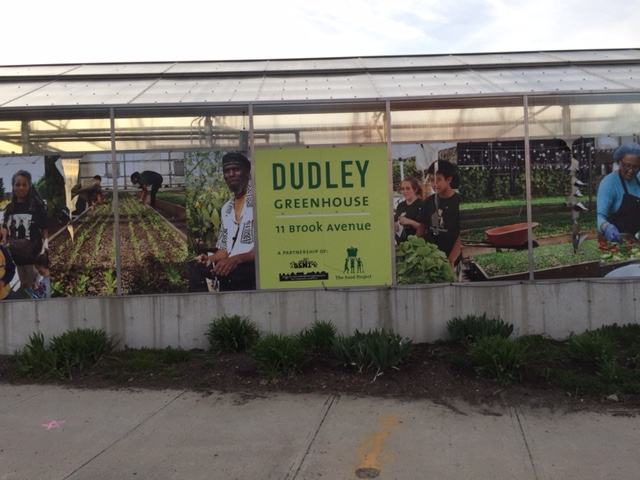
A community garden in Roxbury.

=== Other community resources ===
The Green house garden is a program that assists low-income families in obtaining fresh produce. The garden is a Roxbury community initiative to battle obesity rates. The Program is powered by two hundred volunteers who assist in planting the produce as well as maintenance. The BCYF (Boston Center for Youth and Families) Shelburne Community Center serves the Roxbury community. This community resource provides basketball leagues, classes (computer, digital media, martial arts etc.), physical fitness, teen mentoring and more. BCYF is an integral component to the Youth Standing Strong Against Violence program in partnership with the Boston Police Department. The center is located at 2730 Washington Street, Roxbury MA. The Boston Police Department opened a new area B-2 police station in Roxbury, a 34,500-square-foot facility paid for with a $1.7 billion capital improvement bond, in 2011. Project R.I.G.H.T is another community resource afforded to the Roxbury community. This organization is focused on connecting its community residents to matters of community stabilization and economic growth. Project R.I.G.H.T has teamed up with the Boston Public Health Commission, to "develop numerous programs that focus on substance abuse, eliminating health disparities, infectious disease control, neighborhood wellness and BPHC's Violence, Intervention and Prevention program." The ExtraHelp program is also based in Roxbury, where it conducts its live recording at the Roxbury Community College. This program is a weekly television show that helps the student residents with questions, homework, as well as help preparing for the MCAS tests. The student members of the community can call or email the teachers. Programs air on Tuesdays during the fall and winter. Adding to the focus on the youth Roxbury is also home to the Child Services of Roxbury. This program intends to assist troubled youth and also their families. This branch was created specifically to assist children that were living with substance abusing parents. The program has been efficient in decreasing risk factors for the youth by maintaining its family focused assistance. They provide early education services, behavioral health services, youth and family services, and housing services. The Youth Build Boston program has a branch located at 27 Centre St, it has been a resource for the community of Roxbury for 25 years, starting in 1995. This program teaches young people trades and allows them to take on projects. It serves underprivileged children in the community with classes and workshops. The programs focus on 16-year-olds up to 24-year-olds.

=== Environmental resources ===
The Environment, Energy and Open Space Cabinet oversees the Inspectional Services Department, the Environment Department, the Parks and Recreation Department, and oversees programs and policies on energy efficiency, green buildings, groundwater, park planning, recycling, renewable energy, and certain transportation issues. The City of Boston continues to pursue energy-saving initiatives to conserve energy in municipal buildings and also encourage residents and businesses to improve their energy use. They are dedicated to the development and construction of public and private renewable energy systems throughout our community. The Public Works Street Lighting Division is working to convert streetlights from traditional lighting sources, such as mercury vapor and sodium, to LED.

Renew Boston Solar is increasing the solar energy system capacity in Boston. With the assistance of U.S. Department of Energy's SunShot Initiative, the City of Boston launched Renew Boston Solar to encourage the widespread adoption of solar energy in Boston. Through Renew Boston Solar, the City is encouraging the installation of solar technology throughout Boston, including easing permitting requirements, mapping feasible locations, and planning the citywide bulk purchase, financing, and installation of solar technology. The city is working with local organizations to maximize Boston 's participation in state incentive programs and innovative financing initiatives. Plus, the city is tracking and mapping solar and other renewable energy systems in Boston. Solar Boston partners include the U.S. Department of Energy, the Massachusetts Clean Energy Center, local utilities and unions, an anonymous foundation, and a broad range of local, regional, and national clean energy stakeholders.

== Recreational centers ==
The Roxbury YMCA was founded in 1851 in the Greater Boston which is a cause driven nonprofit organization committed to developing youth by informing them about healthy living and promoting social responsibility in the community. It is one of the largest urban YMCA's in the country and Boston s largest provider of social services for children and families. The Greater Boston YMCA offers programs in categories, including adult education, aquatics, childcare, sports and health/wellness.

The John A. Shelburne community center is a non-profit recreational, educational, and cultural enrichment facility located in the heart of historic Roxbury. The Hattie B Copper Community center served Leadership development for women of color for over 89 years. The Center was named after John A. Shelburne, a Roxbury native.

The Reggie Lewis Center was opened in 1995 which was built by the Commonwealth of Massachusetts. This center serves as the home for the Roxbury Community College's powerful intercollegiate and intramural athletics. Known as the "Reggie" and one of the fastest tracks in the World. The "Reggie" hosts over ninety high schools, collegiate and national track meets annually, and some have included meets such as the USA Track and Field Championships, Boston Indoor Games, Northeast 10 Championships, NCAA Division II Championships and the High School National Championships. This center is a place for children and adults can attend to different sports such as basketball, track and soccer. They have community outreach programs that helps students stay out of trouble. There are after school programs to tutor students with their homework, physical activities and Arts and Crafts.

== Education ==
=== Primary and secondary schools ===
Students in Roxbury are served by Boston Public Schools (BPS). BPS assigns students based on preferences of the applicants and priorities of students in various zones. Roxbury contains Boston Latin Academy, Madison Park Technical Vocational High School and John D. O'Bryant School of Mathematics & Science, 7–12 secondary schools and two of the city's three exam schools. Roxbury Charter High Public School was located in the area from 2003 to 2006.

Roxbury High School was once located on Greenville Avenue.

The Boston Public Schools' pilot schools have a great partnership that was launched in 1994 among Mayor Thomas M. Menino, the Boston School Committee, superintendent, and the Boston Teachers Union. The pilot schools were created to be models of educational innovation and to serve as research and development sites for effective urban public schools. Pilot schools are part of the school district but have over budget, staffing, governance, curriculum/assessment, and the school calendar to provide increased flexibility to organize schools and staffing to meet the needs of students and families. Roxbury has six Horace Mann Charter Schools, which is also called the district charter schools. Alternative school is when a student that just came to America, helps students has a strong start in the Boston Public schools. There are other programs that help students that are over-age or off-track, who need to go to school at night, has disabilities, and has disciplinary issues. Turnaround schools allows Boston Public Schools to come into the school to assist their lowest-performing schools by changing the staff, increasing class time, and adding new supports for students. With these flexibilities, the "Level 4" schools can access new tools to that can increase improvement in performance.

=== Colleges and universities ===
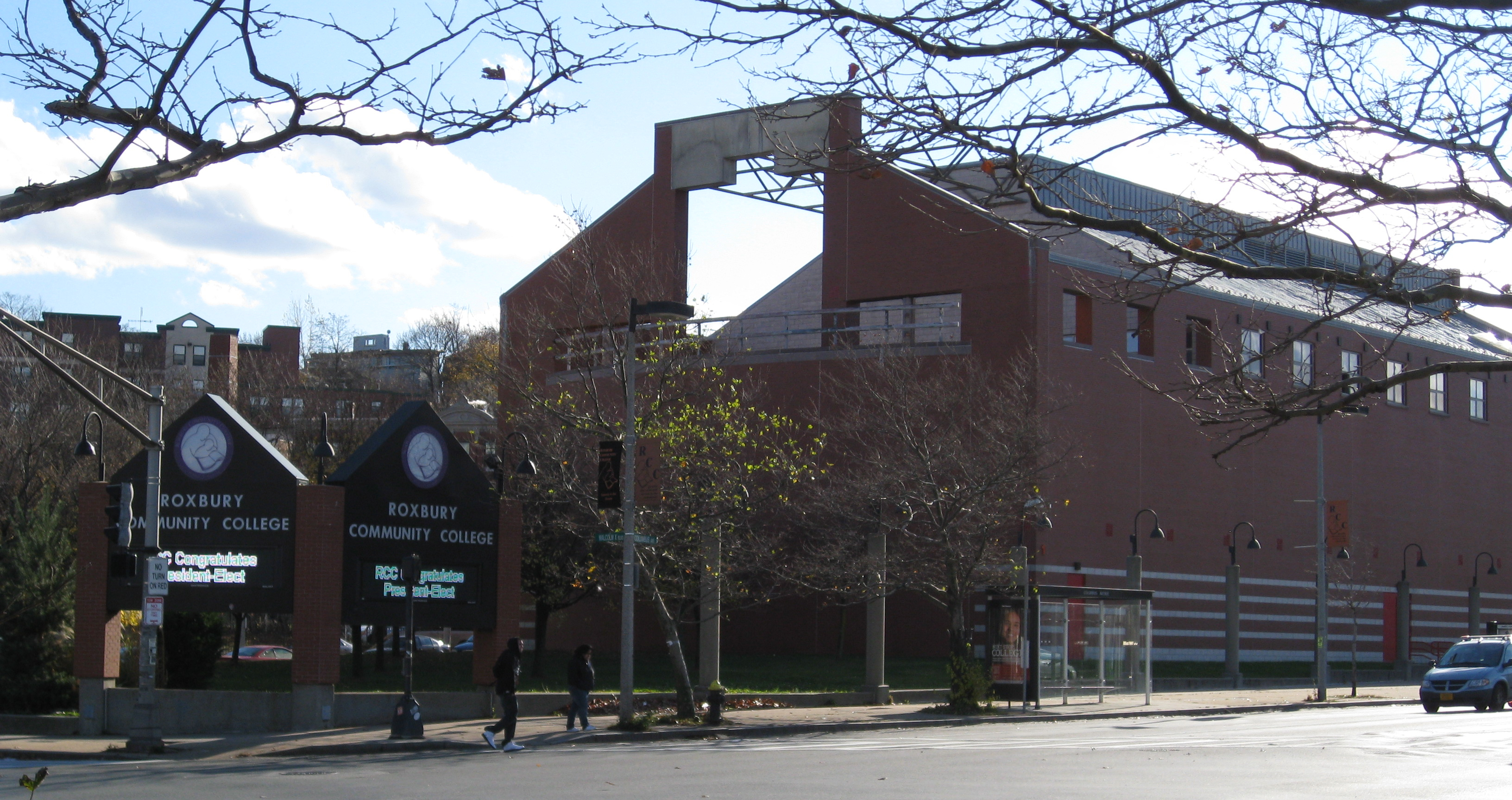
Roxbury Community College

Roxbury is home to Roxbury Community College, a co-educational public institution of higher education offering Associate Degrees and certificate programs. Beginning in the Fall semester from academic school year 2011–2013 Roxbury Community College has had an average female enrollment of 1761, and an average male enrollment of 868 in credit courses. Through the years 2011–2013, the school has had an average of 1253 black students, 10 Native-American Indian students, 52 Asian American students, 426 Latino students, 167 White, 10 non-resident alien, and 710 students enrolled reported their ethnicity unknown. Gordon-Conwell Theological Seminary's Center for Urban Ministerial Education (CUME)opened in 1976 at Twelfth Baptist Church. The campus has over 400 students. To accommodate the diversity of the school, "classes are taught in English, Spanish, French Creole and Portuguese, with occasional classes in American Sign Language". The Roxbury campus is represented by students of 21 different nationalities and 39 denominations. The college is located at 90 Warren St. in Roxbury, Ma. Emmanuel College's spiritual retreat center. This center offers spiritual education to all staff and students for no charge. The center is designed to promote a relationship with god and explore your own spirituality. Further, The Eastern Nazarene College offers Adult Studies/LEAD classes in Roxbury.

=== Public libraries ===
Boston Public Library operates the Shaw-Roxbury Branch in Roxbury. The branch, which opened in April 1978, replaced the Mount Pleasant Branch, a library branch, and the Fellowes Athenaeum, a privately endowed facility. Next to the Dudley Branch Library is the Dudley Literacy Center which assists patrons who are learning English as a second language. It is the largest public library literacy center in the Boston Public Library system. The Grove Hall Branch of the Boston Public Library, which was formerly located on Crawford Street since 1971, is now located at 41 Geneva Avenue in Dorchester/Roxbury. The Branch is in a new facility that opened in April 2009.

=== Other educational services ===
Boston Day and Evening Academy, located in Roxbury, re-engages off-track students in their education. It prepares them for high school graduation, post-secondary success and meaningful participation in their community. BDEA is open 10 hours a day in where it serves any Boston Public School student who is overage for high school, who has had trouble with attendance issues, has been held back in 8th grade, who feels they are not getting the attention in class that they need to succeed, or who has dropped out but is eager to come back to school to earn their diploma. City on a Hill Charter Public School is a cluster of charter schools in Roxbury. It is a network of three college preparatory high schools in the cities of Boston and New Bedford. Each City on a Hill school is tuition-free and open to all students. CoaH schools do not have entrance exams; students are admitted by a random lottery with new students admitted in the ninth grade only. City on a Hill serves students who are traditionally underserved by the public school system. The majority of students arrive performing significantly below grade level. However, 100% of City on a Hill students pass the MCAS, and 91% of recent graduates have enrolled in college. While a fully-grown City on a Hill school operates almost entirely on state funds, they rely on private gifts to supplement the operating budget of growing schools, to provide capital support, and to fund special projects and educational initiatives. Charter schools are entitled to federal categorical funding for which their students are eligible, such as Title I and Special Education monies. Federal legislation provides grants to help charters to manage start-up costs.

== Entertainment ==
=== Museums ===
The Hamill Gallery of African Art was owned by Bobbi and Tim Hamill and housed in a 19th-century wallpaper factory that Tim Hamill had purchased in the 1970s. With over 40,000 pieces from Ghana, Mali and Nigeria they hoped to educate the public about tribalism and the importance of authentic art. Many of these objects preserve and convey beliefs and values about tribalism. The masks were typically used in costumes to dance for social structure, education, or entertainment as displayed through their 70 traveling exhibits. The gallery opened in 1990 and closed in 2019.

=== Parks ===
Several parks, including the urban wilds that surround the William J. Devine Memorial Golf Course and Franklin Park, offer residents substantial green space. Other parks including in the "urban wild" space are the Eliot Burying Grounds, the Puddingstone Garden and the Buena Vista Urban wilds. These parks recently received $450k in grants to restore and revitalize the areas in the community. Some other active parks are the Southwest Corridor Park, Highland Park, known as Fort Hill, along with the Elma Lewis Playhouse Park. The Emma Lewis Playhouse Park has annual concerts and other miscellaneous venues year round and the park is an active member of the Franklin Parks Coalition.

=== Miscellaneous entertainment in Roxbury ===
The Roxbury Center for the Arts, Culture, and Trade, which opened in 2005, celebrates community culture through visual and performance arts.

Roxbury International Film festival has been running since 1999 and was formerly known as the Dudley Film Festival, it was later changed to encompass all of Roxbury. The festival supports films with people of color or people of color who have created the films. For about four days, many different films are screened, to date more than 600 films have been screened at the festival.. The festival is New England's largest film festival that "showcases and honors the work of emerging and established filmmakers of color". Along with screening of new independent films, the film festival also provides workshops for artists to come together and share ideas as well as learn new methods.

The Roxbury Unity Parade celebrates Roxbury's Black community and culture.

Roxbury has also held an Annual Mother's Day Walk for Peace since 2000.

Public sculptures and murals can also be seen on Ruggles Street and Malcolm X Boulevard.

MainStage theater provided by the Roxbury Community College provides workshops for students and kids in the community. They also have public plays open to all. Also, public speakers visit the theater for open to the public speeches.

== Historic buildings ==
Abbotsford – 300 Walnut Avenue
Abbotsford was built in 1872 for industrialist Aaron Davis Williams Jr. It was designed by architect Alden Frink. The structure, originally named Oak Bend, is an example of a Victorian Gothic-style villa in Boston and a reminder of the 19th century prosperity. The home was once part of an estate known for its apple orchards; it later served as a school for delinquent boys. It was purchased in 1976 by the National Center of Afro-American Artists and renovated for use as a museum dedicated to the collection and exhibition of the black visual arts heritage worldwide.

Blue Hill Avenue Synagogue – 397 Blue Hill Avenue
Designed and built by architect Frederick Norcross in 1905. Financed by the Adath Jeshurun congregation, it was erected at a center of Jewish activity in early 20th century Boston. In 1967, the temple was sold to Ecclesia Apostolic because the Jewish population was rapidly declining because of the white flight as the area became the heart of black culture in Boston. The First Haitian Baptist Church purchased the Late Romanesque Revival building in 1978 and restored it to its present state.

Cedar Street Marble Row Houses – 28–40 Cedar St.
This marble-clad block is an example of Second Empire style design, a French style popular at the time of Roxbury's annexation to Boston in 1868. Built by George D. Cox in 1871, the houses were an attempt to attract other developers by creating the base for a middle-class urban square.

Cox Building – John Eliot Square
Built in 1870 by developer G.D. Cox, this building typifies the post-Civil War reconstruction of Roxbury from an independent rural town to a suburban neighborhood. The Cox Building originally consisted of a central section containing street-level stores with hotel rooms on the upper floors, flanked by five attached one-family residences.

Edward Everett Hale House – 12 Morley St.
A Unitarian clergyman and well-known humanitarian reformer, lived in the Greek Revival residence for over forty years. He was also an author of many novels, including The Man Without a Country. The house was built on Highland Street in 1841 during the early period of suburban growth, and was moved to this location between 1899 and 1906.

Eliot Burying Ground – Eustis St.
This has been the oldest cemetery in Roxbury. It was established in 1630 and named after Reverend John Eliot. He is buried in the Parish Tomb, along with other early ministers of the First Parish of Roxbury.

First Church of Roxbury – John Eliot Square
The oldest wood frame church in Boston, this 1804 building is the fifth meetinghouse on this site since the first church was built in 1632. The architect, William Blaney, was a church member. The land around it is a fragment of the original town commons. Its most famous pastor was Reverend John Eliot, the missionary to the Algonquin Native American tribe. Due to Eliot's work, First Church in Roxbury was one of only three churches in the Puritan Massachusetts era to admit Native Americans as full-fledged members.

Freedom House – 14 Crawford St.
The Freedom House was established in 1949 by social workers Otto and Muriel Snowden. The Freedom House is an important social, educational and political organization and gathering place for the neighborhoods of Roxbury, Mattapan, Dorchester and Jamaica Plain. It has been at the center of key political movements in Boston, including urban renewal in the 1960s, the bus crisis of the 1970s, and education reform for the city's children beginning in the 1990s.

Hibernian Hall – Dudley Square
Hibernian Hall was one of the last of then-Dudley Square's lively Irish social clubs and dance halls during the first half of the twentieth century. It began in 1836 in New York City as a response to anti-Irish sentiment, and later shifted to charitable work and the promotion and preservation of Irish cultural heritage.

Landing Place – 500 Parker St.
This was one of two public boat landing sites that served the town in Colonial Times. In 1658, John Pierpont built a tidal mill here at the point where the Stony Brook emptied into the Tidal Basin. In 1821, the Mill Dam was built for power. The Sewall and Day Cordage Mill was built here in 1834, which became the largest manufacturer of rope used in maritime trades.

Malcolm X and Ella Little-Collins House – 72 Dale St
This was the home of Ella Little-Collins, an educator and sister of activist and Muslim leader Malcolm X, who lived here in the early 1940s and referenced his time here in The Autobiography of Malcolm X. Little-Collins acted as a parental figure to Malcolm, encouraging him to study theology and law during his incarceration. Malcolm returned to Boston in 1953 and founded Temple Number Eleven. After visiting the holy city of Mecca in 1964, Malcolm rejected black separatism and adopted the name El-Hajj Malik El-Shabazz. He was later assassinated in 1965.

Mission Church - The Basilica of Our Lady of Perpetual Help – 1545 Tremont St.
The current church was designed by William Schickel and Isaac Ditmars of New York. The then German congregation broke ground in 1874. The Mission Church was constructed in Romanesque style, of Roxbury puddingstone, quarried from what is now Puddingstone Park, just down the block. An octagonal, cupola-topped lantern rises over a hundred feet above the crossing.

Palladio Hall – 60–62 Warren St.
Built in the late 1870s, Palladio Hall is a rare Boston example of an Italian Renaissance-style commercial block. It was designed and owned by Nathaniel J. Bradlee.

Shirley Eustis House – 33 Shirley St.
Construction for the Shirley Eustis House began in 1747 but was not completed until 1750 by the governor of the Massachusetts, William Shirley. This mansion is one of only four remaining colonial governors' mansions in the United States. The house served as a barracks during the Siege of Boston in 1775–1776, housing the Continental Army's Sixth Regiment of Foot. From 1823 to 1825 it was the home of Massachusetts governor William Eustis, the first Democrat to hold that post.

Spooner-Lambert House – 64 Bartlett St.
Built in 1782 for Major John Jones Spooner, first commander of the Roxbury Artillery. Boston merchant Captain William Lambert bought the house in 1788.

William Lloyd Garrison House – Highland Park St.
This Greek Revival residence was the home of William Lloyd Garrison, leader of the anti-slavery cause in Boston and editor of the abolition journal The Liberator. The house, called Rockledge, was built in the 1840s, during Roxbury's early period of suburban population growth. After emancipation was achieved, Garrison and his wife retired to his mansion in 1864.

== City infrastructure ==
=== Waste collection and disposal ===
The Code Enforcement Police's (CEP) primary function is to enforce the State and City sanitary codes related to illegal dumping, improper storage of trash, illegal vending and posting, and unshoveled sidewalks. CEP maintains a strong presence in the City by patrolling the streets of Boston on foot, bike, or car. The Waste Reduction Division (formerly Recycling and Sanitation) is responsible for the collection and disposal of residential recyclables, trash, and leaf and yard waste. The Division also holds hazardous waste drop-off days up to four times per year, seasonal paint and motor oil drop-offs, and offers discounted backyard compost bins. Boston has single-stream recycling. You can mix all recyclable materials together and place them on the curb for pickup on your recycling day. In addition, they collect and composts residents' leaf and yard waste on designated recycling days from April to the first week of December. Boston residents can also safely dispose of hazardous waste and shred unwanted documents for free on specific dates and events.

== Transportation ==
The Massachusetts Bay Transportation Authority (MBTA) provides subway and bus services to the Roxbury community.

The Silver Line bus route stops at Nubian Station, an above-ground bus hub. Roxbury is served by bus lines 15, 19, 22, 23, 25, 28, 42, 44, 45, 66, 1, 8, 10, 14, 15, 19, 23, 28, 41, 42, 44, 45, 47, 66, 170, and 171.

== Notable people ==
- Jalen Adams (born 1995), basketball player in the VTB United League
- Irving Ashby (1920–1987), jazz guitarist
- Shauna Barbosa (born ca. 1988), poet, born in Roxbury
- Edith Barrett (1907–1977), actress
- Ruth Batson (1921–2003), civil rights and education activist
- Susan Batson (born 1943), actress, daughter of Ruth Batson
- Michael Beach (born 1963), actor
- Ricky Bell (born 1967), singer
- Michael Bivins, member of R&B group New Edition formed in Boston in 1978
- Nathaniel Jeremiah Bradlee (1829–1888), architect
- Edward Brooke (1919–2015), U.S. senator, first African American elected to Senate in the 20th century
- Bobby Brown (born 1969), member of R&B group New Edition formed in Boston in 1978
- Melnea Cass (1896–1978), civil rights and community activist known as "The First Lady of Roxbury"
- Charlene Carroll (1950-), entrepreneur and hair care expert
- Wilhelmina Crosson (1900–1991), educator
- James Michael Curley (1874–1958), four-term mayor of Boston, congressman, and governor of Massachusetts
- Alan Dawson (1929–1996), jazz drummer and percussion teacher, grew up in Roxbury
- Henry Dearborn (1751–1829), physician, general, U.S. representative, U.S. Secretary of War
- Henry Alexander Scammell Dearborn (1783–1851), U.S. representative, mayor of Roxbury, son of Henry Dearborn
- Elaine Denniston (born 1939), lawyer, supported the Apollo program
- Ronnie DeVoe, member of R&B group New Edition formed in Boston in 1978
- Joseph Dudley (1647–1720), colonial governor of Massachusetts, son of Thomas Dudley
- Thomas Dudley (1576–1653), colonial governor of Massachusetts
- Ed O.G. (born 1970), hip hop artist, founder of Da Bulldogs, named an album after Roxbury
- Barbara Clark Elam (1929–2017)
- John Eliot (1604–1690), minister, Bible translator, founder of Roxbury Latin School
- Gustavus Esselen (1888–1952), chemist, born in Roxbury
- William Eustis (1753–1825), governor of Massachusetts, owner of Shirley-Eustis House in Roxbury
- Louis Farrakhan (born 1933), Nation of Islam leader, activist, raised in Roxbury
- Jessie Forsyth (1847/49 – 1937), temperance advocate
- Mark Frechette (1947–1975), film actor, Zabriskie Point
- Margaret Foley (1875–1957), suffragist
- The G-Clefs, soul group
- William Lloyd Garrison (1805–1879), journalist, abolitionist, lived in Roxbury the last 15 years of his life
- Charles Dana Gibson (1867–1944), illustrator
- Ezekiel Goldthwait (1710–1782), colonial businessman, owner of a country estate in Roxbury
- Samuel Griswold Goodrich (1793–1860), author, state legislator
- Diane Guerrero (born 1986), actress
- Guru (1966–2010), rapper, member/founder of Gang Starr
- Edward Everett Hale (1822–1909), author, reformer, Unitarian clergyman
- Ellen Day Hale (1855–1940), American Impressionist painter and printmaker, daughter of Edward Everett Hale
- Roy Haynes (1925–2024), jazz drummer and bandleader
- Elma Lewis (1921–2004), arts educator, founder of the National Center of Afro-American Artists (NCAAA)
- Mel Lyman (1938–1978), harmonica player, leader of The Lyman Family
- James Magee (1750–1801), pioneer of the Maritime Fur Trade
- Nelson Merced, state legislator, Latino activist
- Charles McBurney, surgeon
- Wayne Millner (1913–1976), American football player
- Liz Miranda, state legislator, first Cape Verdean woman elected to MA House of Representatives
- Lucy Miller Mitchell (1899–2002), educator and activist
- Shabazz Napier (born 1991), NBA player
- Patrice O'Neal (1969–2011), comedian, actor
- Oye Owolewa (born 1989), U.S. representative
- Louis Prang (1824–1909), printer, lithographer and publisher
- William Pynchon (1590–1662), founder of Roxbury and Springfield, Massachusetts
- Sylvester H. Roper (1823–1896), inventor
- Nathaniel Ruggles (1761–1819), U.S. representative
- Byron Rushing (born 1942), state legislator, activist
- Joan Ruth (born 1904 - died?), soprano
- Kenneth Kamal Scott (1940 - 2015), singer, dancer, actor, nephew of Irving Ashby
- Ebenezer Seaver (1763–1844), U.S. representative
- Wayne Selden Jr. (born 1994), basketball player in the Israeli Basketball Premier League
- William Shirley (1694–1771), colonial governor of Massachusetts, built Shirley-Eustis House in Roxbury
- Guido St. Laurent (c.1930–1968), community organizer
- Ebenezer Stevens (1751–1823), American Revolution activist, officer
- Kemp Stillings (1888–1967), violinist, music teacher, composer
- Sonny Stitt (1924–1982), jazz saxophonist
- Ellen M. Stone (1846–1927), missionary, teacher, author remembered for the Miss Stone Affair
- John L. Sullivan (1858–1918), boxing heavyweight champion, born in Roxbury
- Donna Summer (1948–2012), R&B singer, "Queen of Disco"
- Increase Sumner (1746–1799), governor of Massachusetts
- Ralph Tresvant (born 1968), member of R&B group New Edition formed in Boston in 1978
- Martha Tucker, great-grandmother of Laura Ingalls Wilder and the main character of the Little House:The Martha Years series of books
- Darius Walker, CNN Vice President and New York bureau chief, lived in Roxbury as a youth
- Jimmy Walker (1944–2007), professional basketball guard
- Joseph Warren (1741–1775), physician, Revolutionary major general
- Lakiyra Williams (born 1991), rapper, poet, vocalist
- Tony Williams (1945–1997), jazz drummer, grew up in Roxbury
- Gladys Wood (1916–2017), Boston Public Schools' first Black principal
- Malcolm X (1925–1965), Nation of Islam minister and activist, founder of the Organization of Afro-American Unity, spent formative years in Roxbury

== Sites of interest ==
- Franklin Park Zoo
- Hibernian Hall
- John D. O'Bryant School of Mathematics & Science
- Madison Park Technical Vocational High School
- Nubian Square
- Roxbury Community College
- Shirley-Eustis House

== See also ==
- Former Mayors of Roxbury
- Roxbury Film Festival
- Roxbury High Fort
- St. Joseph's Church
