= Boston Latin Academy =

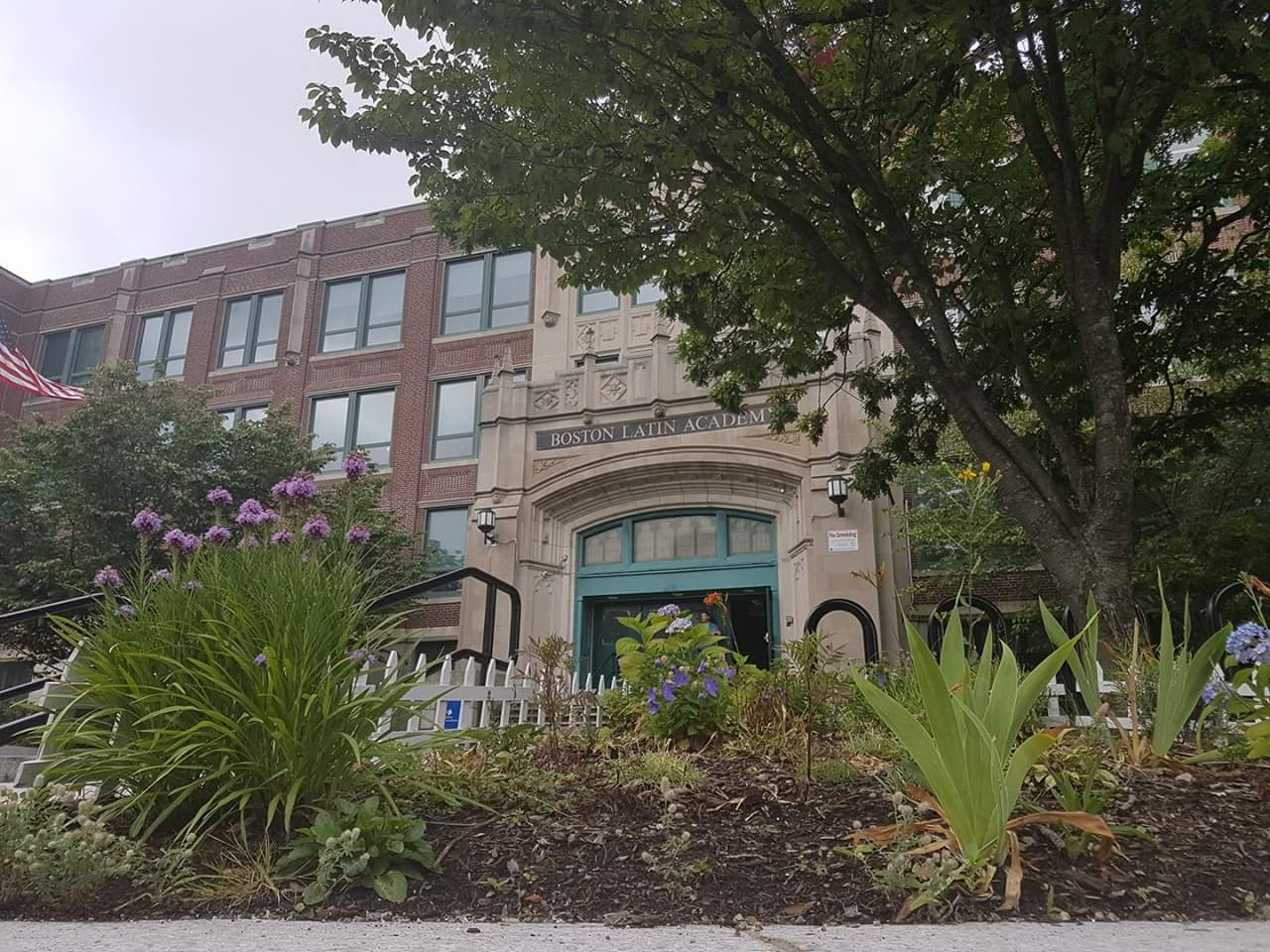

Location
- 205 Townsend Street; Boston, Massachusetts; United States

Information
- Type: Public coeducational exam school
- Motto: 'Vita Tua Sit Sincera' (Latin) ('Let Thy Life be Sincere')
- Established: November 27, 1877 (148 years ago)
- School district: Boston Public Schools
- Head of School: Gavin Smith
- Faculty: about 90
- Teaching staff: 94.70 (FTE)
- Grade level: 7–12
- Gender: Coeducational
- Enrollment: 1,693 (2024–2025)
- Student to teacher ratio: 17.88
- Colors: Black and gold
- Athletics: Dragons
- Athletics conference: Boston City League
- Mascot: Jabberwock
- Nickname: "BLA" "Dragons"
- Rival: John D. O'Bryant School of Mathematics & Science formerly Boston Technical High School
- National ranking: 279
- Newspaper: Dragon Tales
- Website: www.latinacademy.org

Boston Latin Academy (BLA) is a public exam school founded in 1878 in Boston, Massachusetts providing students in grades 7th through 12th a classical preparatory education.

Originally named Girls' Latin School, it became the first college preparatory high school for girls in the United States. Coeducational since 1972, the school is located in the Roxbury neighborhood of Boston and is part of Boston Public Schools (BPS).

== History ==
Boston Latin Academy (BLA) was established on November 27, 1877 as Girls' Latin School (GLS). The school was founded with the intention to give a classical education and college preparatory training to girls. A plan to admit girls to Public Latin School was formed by an executive committee of the Massachusetts Society for the University Education of Women. Henry Fowle Durant, founder of Wellesley College and an advocate of higher education for women, was instrumental in outlining the legal route for the school to be established. A petition with a thousand signatures was presented to the School Board in September 1877. The board referred the question to the subcommittee on high schools. Ultimately the subcommittee recommended that a separate school for girls be established. John Tetlow was unanimously elected by the School Committee on January 22, 1878 as its first headmaster. On February 4, 1878, Tetlow accepted the first thirty-seven students.

Girls' Latin School opened on West Newton Street in Boston's South End on February 12, 1878 sharing the building with Girls' High School. The thirty-seven students were divided according to aptitude into three classes; the Sixth, Fifth, and Third class. The first graduating class in 1880 included Alice M. Mills, Charlotte W. Rogers, Vida D. Scudder, Mary L. Mason, Alice S. Rollins, and Miriam S. Witherspoon; all six were accepted to Smith College.

In 1888, Abbie Farwell Brown, Sybil Collar, and Virginia Holbrook decided to create a school newspaper. The name Jabberwock was picked from a list that Abbie Farwell Brown submitted. It was taken from "Jabberwocky", the famous nonsense poem written by Lewis Carroll in Through the Looking Glass. They wrote to Lewis Carroll in London about the name and received a handwritten letter giving them permission for its use. The Jabberwock is one of the oldest school newspapers in the United States.

With the number of students growing each year, in 1898 the school committee moved the first four classes to a building in Copley Square while the rest remained in the older building. In 1907, the school moved into a new building, shared with the Boston Normal School.

Girls' Latin School expanded from approximately 421 students in 1907 to 1,350 students in 1955. The City of Boston had turned over the entirety of the campus to the state in 1952, and when State Teachers College at Boston (the former Normal School) expanded, Girls' Latin School was forced to relocate to the former Dorchester High School for Girls building located in Codman Square.

In 1972, boys were admitted for the first time to Girls' Latin School. The school name was changed in 1975 and the first graduating class of Boston Latin Academy was in 1977.

In 1981, Latin Academy moved back into the Fenway area, this time to Ipswich Street, across from Fenway Park. It remained there until the summer of 1991, when it moved again, this time to its present location in the former Roxbury Memorial and Boston Technical High School building, located on Townsend Street in Roxbury.

In 2001, Boston Latin Academy became the first high school to form an official Eastern Massachusetts High School Red Cross Club. The club is one of the biggest in the school with over 100 members. Latin Academy's Red Cross Club is also one of the biggest high school Red Cross Club in Eastern Massachusetts.

94% of its graduating students go on to attend four-year colleges. In 2010 Boston Latin Academy received a Silver Medal as one of the top public high schools in the nation by U.S. News & World Report.

=== Locations ===
Photo	Description	Address and Coordinates	Notes
	1878–1907; Built from 1869 through 1871, the building was home to Girls' Latin from its inception in 1878 (sharing space with Girls' High and Normal School) until 1907. It was razed in 1960 and a playground now occupies the site.	75 West Newton Street, South End; 42.340558°N 71.075605°W	
Chauncy Hall	1898–1907; In February 1898, 240 students were moved to the former Chauncy Hall School building in Copley Square which had been vacated two years earlier. The remaining pupils continued studies at the West Newton Street location.	593–597 Boylston Street, Back Bay; 42.350283°N 71.076813°W	
	1907–1955; As of 2025 the only building built specifically for Girls' Latin, later becoming part of Massachusetts College of Art and Design.	Huntington Avenue, Fenway; 42.337444°N 71.099389°W	
	1955–1981; In 1955 the school moved to the former Dorchester High School and Dorchester High School for Girls building in Codman Square, originally completed in 1901.	380 Talbot Avenue, Dorchester; 42.2903°N 71.0701°W	
	1981–1991; The school returned to the Fenway area in a former post office garage and afterward an annex of Boston State College. After BLA was relocated this building housed Boston Arts Academy and was later razed in 2019.	174 Ipswich Street, Fenway; 42.346306°N 71.095139°W	
	1991–present Since 1991, the school has been located in the former home of the Roxbury Memorial High School, and later Boston Technical High School.	205 Townsend Street, Roxbury; 42.316528°N 71.084306°W	

== Heads of School ==
The title of the school's chief administrator was changed from "Headmaster" to "Head of School" during the 2020–2021 school year.

- John Tetlow (1878–1910)
- Ernest J. Hapgood (1910–1948)
- Louis A. McCoy (1948–1957)
- Thomas F. Gately (1957–1965)
- William T. Miller (1965–1966)
- Margaret C. Carroll (1966–1978)
- M. Louise Dooley (acting, 1978–1979)
- Christopher Lane (1979–1981)
- Douglas Foster (1981–1983)
- Robert Binswanger (1983–1991)
- Maria Garcia-Aaronson (1991–2009)
- Emilia Pastor (2010–2014; 2014–2015)
- Richard Sullivan (acting, 2014)
- Troy Henninger (2015–2017)
- Chimdi Uchendu (2017–2020) (acting until 2018)
- Gerald Howland (acting, 2020–2021)
- Gavin Smith (2021–present)

== Notable alumni ==
Known class year listed. Non-graduate alumni noted as NG.

=== Academia, science and technology ===
- Thelma Shoher Baker (1941) – educator and anthropologist
- G. Yvonne Young (later Clark) (1947) – female engineering pioneer working at NASA and Tennessee State University
- Helen F. Cullen (1936) – mathematician
- Anna Parker Fessenden (1914) – botanist and mathematics educator
- Mary Welleck Garretson (1914) – geology teacher, paleontology and stratigraphy consultant.
- Deborah Tepper Haimo (1939) – mathematician
- Barbara Gould Henry (1949) – taught Ruby Bridges, the first African-American child to attend the all-white William Frantz Elementary School in New Orleans, alone in a classroom guarded by Federal Marshals.
- Catherine McArdle Kelleher (1956) – political scientist
- Maud Worcester Makemson (1908) – astronomer, director of Vassar Observatory
- Marie Mercury (1941) – chemist
- Martha Jane Bergin (1942) – chemical engineer
- Dorothy Quiggle (1922) – MIT Chemical Engineering BSc, MSc, Penn State PhD and professor of chemical engineering.
- Rose Rosengard (1959) – musicologist
- Evelyn Shakir (1956) – academic and author
- Barbara Miller Solomon (1936) – historian, first woman associate dean at Harvard University

=== Business ===
- Nathan Blecharczyk (2001) – co-founder and Chief Strategy Officer of Airbnb
- Edith Nason Buckingham (NG) – first woman to earn a Ph.D. in zoology at Radcliffe College

=== Arts and music ===
- Eunice Alberts (1940) – opera singer
- Louise Bogan (NG) – poet
- Lorraine O'Grady (1952) – conceptual and performance artist
- Josephine Preston Peabody (ca. 1892) – poet and dramatist

=== Athletics ===
- Maribel Vinson Owen (1928) Nine-time US National Figure skating champion and seven-time US National Pairs champion
- Senda Berenson Abbott (NG) – women's basketball pioneer and member of Women's Basketball Hall of Fame
- Barbara Polk Washburn (1931) – first woman to climb Denali (Mount McKinley)

=== Film, television and theatre ===
- Florence Fowle Adams (ca. 1881) – dramatic reader, actor, and teacher
- Susan Batson (NG) – producer, actress and author
- Esther Howard (1911) – actress

=== Writers and journalists ===
- Abbie Farwell Brown (1891) – writer
- Ursula Parrott (1916) best selling author of Ex-Wife
- Uri Berenguer (2001) – radio broadcaster
- Mary Caroline Crawford (1903) – author, social worker and suffragist
- Norma Holzmann (1926) – writer and poet
- Theodora Kimball Hubbard (1904) – Author
- Gladys Edson Locke (1906), novelist and librarian
- Mary McGrory (1935) – Pulitzer Prize winning journalist on Nixon's Enemies List.
- Carol Natelson Newsom (1964) – photojournist
- Sarah-Ann Shaw (1952) – journalist and Boston's first Black female TV reporter
- Dorothy West – Harlem Renaissance author

=== Government and diplomacy ===
- Eileen R. Donovan (1932) – Educator, diplomat, and U.S. Ambassador to Barbados

=== Judiciary and law ===
- Patti B. Saris (1969) – Chief Judge of the United States District Court for the District of Massachusetts

=== Medicine ===
- Hannah Myrick (1892) – physician, superintendent of New England Hospital for Women and Children

=== Politicians ===
- Daniel J. Hunt (1999) – member of Massachusetts House of Representatives from the 13th Suffolk district
- Alice Koerner Wolf (1951) – mayor of Cambridge, Massachusetts and member of the Massachusetts House of Representatives from 1996 to 2013, representing the 25th Middlesex District.

=== Activists ===
- Ruth Batson (1939) – civil rights activist, executive director of the Metropolitan Council for Educational Opportunity (METCO)
- Ellen Swepson Jackson (NG) – pioneer of Boston school desegregation

=== Other ===
- Ida Shaw Martin – Founder of the Delta Delta Delta sorority

== Athletics ==
Latin Academy offers a wide variety of sports. The team nickname is Dragons, analogous to the original school mascot the Jabberwock.

- Baseball
- Basketball (boys)
- Basketball (girls)
- Cheerleading
- Football
- Indoor Track
- Hockey (boys)
- Hockey (girls)
- Lacrosse (boys)
- Lacrosse (girls)
- Outdoor Track
- Soccer (boys)
- Soccer (girls)
- Softball
- Swimming
- Tennis (boys)
- Tennis (girls)
- Track
- Volleyball (boys)
- Volleyball (girls)
- Wrestling

== See also ==
- Boston Latin School
- John D. O'Bryant School of Mathematics & Science
