= Carol Newsom =

Carol Newsom may refer to:

- Carol Newsom (photographer) (1946–2003), American tennis photographer
- Carol A. Newsom (born 1950), American biblical scholar

== See also ==
- Carroll Vincent Newsom (1904–1990), American educator
