= Abbie Farwell Brown =

American writer

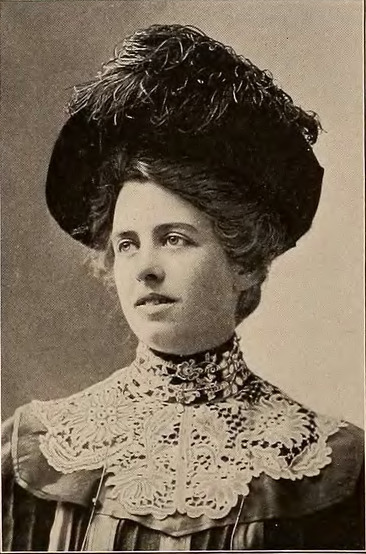
- Born: August 21, 1871; Boston
- Died: March 5, 1927 (aged 55); Boston
- Alma mater: Radcliffe College
- Occupation: Writer

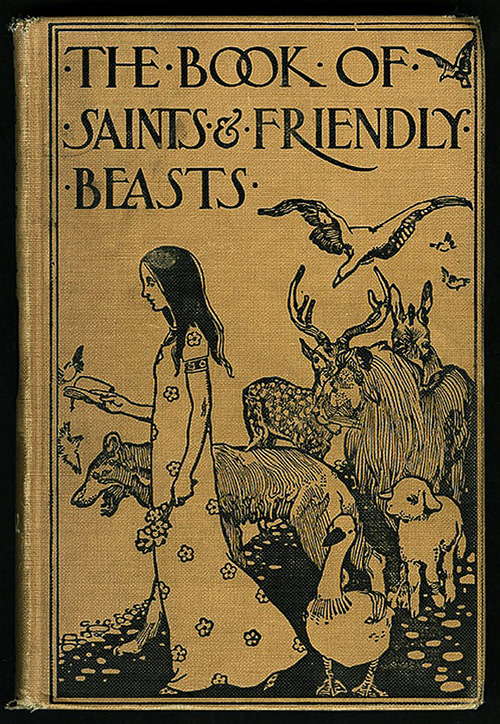
The Book of Saints and Friendly Beasts (1900)

Abbie Farwell Brown (August 21, 1871 – March 5, 1927) was an American writer.

== Early life and education ==
Brown was born in Boston, Massachusetts, the first of two daughters of Benjamin F. Brown, a descendant of Isaac Allerton, and Clara Neal Brown, who contributed to The Youth's Companion. Her sister Ethel became an author and illustrator under the name Ann Underhill. Her family, for ten generations, had only resided in New England, and Brown herself spent her entire life in her family's Beacon Hill home.

Brown was valedictorian of the Bowdoin School in 1886. She then attended the Girls' Latin School, where she was friends with Josephine Preston Peabody. She was the driving force behind the newly created school newspaper, The Jabberwock, named by Brown after the poem by Lewis Carroll. They wrote to Carroll for permission to use the name and Carroll wrote back, wishing them "all success to the forthcoming magazine". (The Jabberwock was published through 1988, when publication was ceased by Boston Latin Academy, although The Jabberwock for alumnae continues to be published by the GLS alumnae association.) After graduating in 1891, she attended Radcliffe College, graduating in 1894.

While at Girls' Latin School, she was contributing pieces to St. Nicholas Magazine, some illustrated by her sister. Starting in 1898, under the pen name Jean Neal she wrote articles for the St. Louis Globe-Democrat. She also wrote a one-act comedy called Quits (1896) set at a women's college.

== Career ==
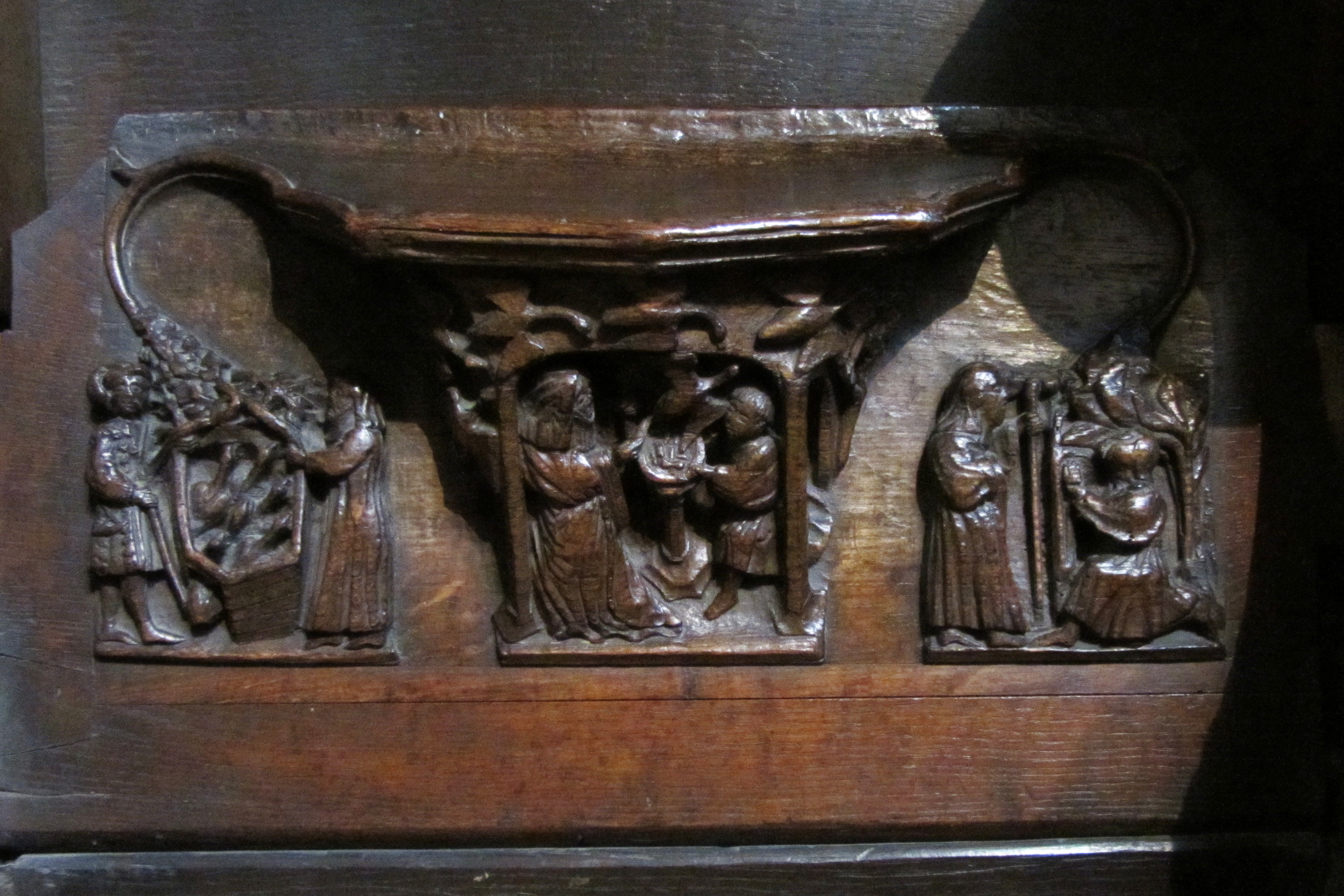
The miracles of Saint Werburgh, including her resurrection of a goose, from the Chester Cathedral

Her first children's book, The Book of Saints and Friendly Beasts (1900) was inspired by her first trip abroad, specifically by the carved choir stalls in Chester Cathedral depicting the life of Saint Werburgh. The book retells Christian stories of the animal encounters of various saints. Brown would write other collections retelling old tales for a contemporary child audience. Her In the Days of Giants (1902) featured stories from Norse mythology and remained a standard text in libraries for several generations. Tales of the Red Children (1909), co-written with James MacIntosh Bell, featured Canadian Indian folklore.

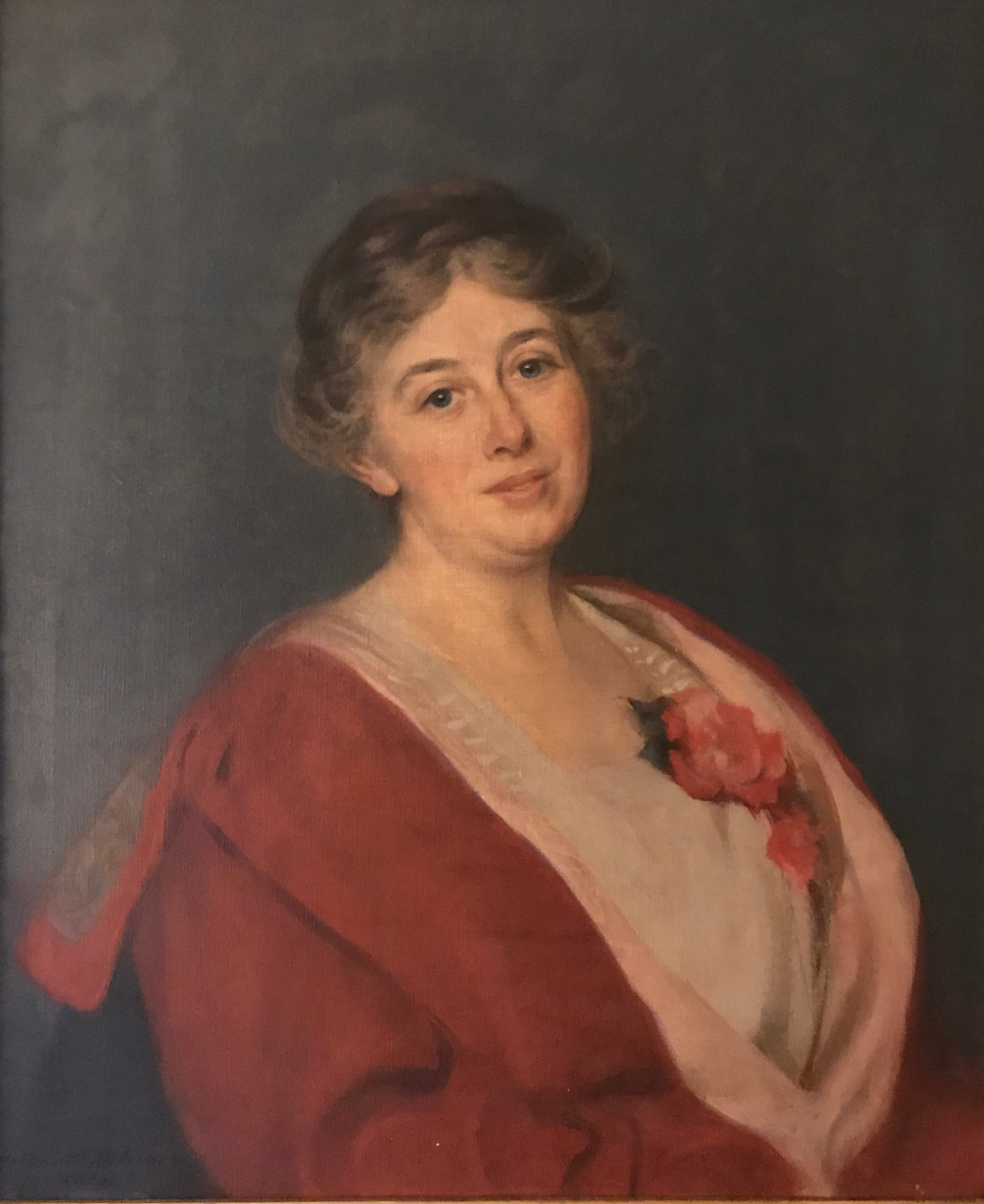
Abbie Farwell Brown in a 1921 portrait by Margaret F. Richardson

Original stories by Brown include The Lonesomest Doll (1901), The Flower Princess (1904), John of the Woods (1909), and The Lucky Stone (1914). She wrote several volumes of children's poetry, including A Pocketful of Posies (1901) and Fresh Posies (1908). Her books of adult poetry, including Heart of New England (1920) and The Silver Stair (1926), were less successful.

Brown wrote song lyrics for the Progressive Music Series by Silver, Burdett and Co. She and composer Mabel Wheeler Daniels wrote the song "On the Trail", which became the official song of the Girl Scouts of the USA. Daniels set Brown's war poem "Peace with a Sword" to music and it was performed by the Handel and Haydn Society in 1917. Brown's only juvenile biography was of a composer, The Boyhood of Edward MacDowell (1924).

Brown was active in New England literary life. She edited the 20-volume Young Folks Library for the publisher Hall and Locke. She was a member of the Boston Authors Club, the Boston Drama League, the American Folklore Society, the Poetry Society of America, and was president of the New England Poetry Club.

== Death ==
Brown died of cancer at the age of 55, at 41 West Cedar Street in Boston.

== Works ==
- The Book of Saints and Friendly Beasts (1900)
- The Lonesomest Doll (1901)
- In the Days of Giants: A Book of Norse Tales (1902)
- A Pocketful of Posies (1902)
- The Curious Book of Birds (1903)
- The Flower Princess (1904)
- The Star Jewels, and Other Wonders (1905)
- Brothers and Sisters (1906)
- Friends and Cousins (1907)
- John of the Woods (1909)
- The Christmas Angel (1910)
- Songs of Sixpence (1914)
- Kisington Town (1915)
- Surprise House (1917)
- Heart of New England (1920)
- Round Robin (1921)
- The Lights of Beacon Hill: A Christmas Message (1922)
- The Silver Stair: Poems (1926)
