= Mary Caroline Crawford =

American author and historian (1874–1932)

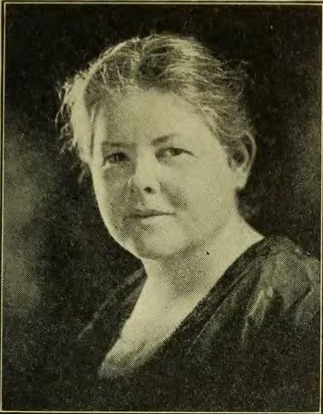
- Born: May 5, 1874; Charlestown, Boston, Massachusetts, U.S.
- Died: November 15, 1932 (aged 58); Beacon Hill, Boston, Massachusetts, U.S.
- Education: Girls' Latin School
- Occupations: Author, social worker and reformer, and suffragist

Mary Caroline Crawford (May 5, 1874 – November 15, 1932) was an American author, social worker and reformer, and suffragist. Her many books about the history of Boston and New England caused her to be called "Boston's social historian".

== Life and career ==
Mary Caroline Crawford was born on May 5, 1874, in the Charlestown neighborhood of Boston, the daughter of James Crawford, owner of a laundry company, and Mary Coburn. She graduated from the Boston Girls' Latin School in 1892. While there, she heard a speech by a female journalist, which inspired her to become a writer herself and she began writing for the school's newspaper. She attended Radcliffe College from 1894 to 1897 but was forced to drop out before graduation due to financial issues. She became a journalist, writing for the Boston Budget, the Boston Transcript, and syndicating articles. Some of her newspaper articles became the basis for her most well-known work, The College Girl of America (1904). Most of her books were about regional history, focusing on her hometown of Boston and the New England region.

In 1907, Crawford graduated from the Boston School for Social Workers. She founded the Social Service Publicity Bureau, which provided promotion and publicity for social welfare organizations. She briefly served as secretary of the Boston chapter of the Women's Trade Union League. She was also active in the Boston Authors Club, the Monday Evening Club for Social Workers, and the Boston Quota Club.

Her most significant role was as Executive Secretary of the Ford Hall Forum between 1908 and 1921 and the Old South Meeting House Forum between 1921 and 1932. At these, she facilitated weekly lectures and discussions with workers.

Crawford died on November 15, 1932, in her Beacon Hill home.

== Bibliography ==
- The Romance of Old New England Rooftrees (1902)
- Crawford, Mary Caroline (1903). The Romance of Old New England Churches. Boston: L. C. Page & Company.
- The College Girl of America (1904)
- Among Old New England Inns (1907)
- St. Boltophs Town (1908)
- Old Boston Days and Ways (1909)
- Romantic Days in Old Boston (1910)
- Goethe and His Woman Friends (1911)
- Romantic Days in the Early Republic (1912)
- The Romance of the American Theatre (1913)
- Social Life in Old New England (1915)
- In the Days of the Pilgrim Fathers (1921)
- Famous Families of Old New England (2 vols., 1924)
