= Dorchester High School for Girls =

Defunct school in Massachusetts, United States

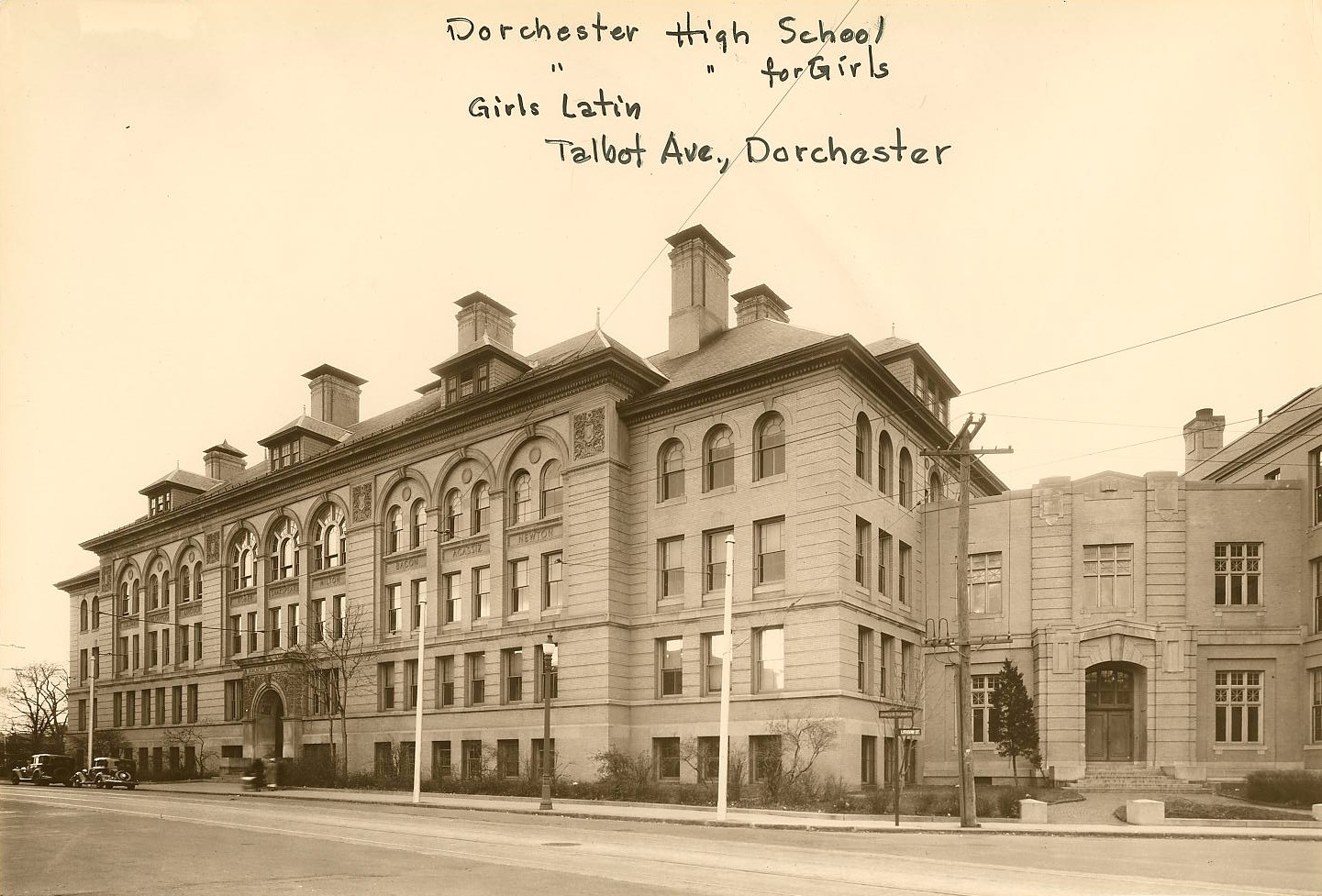
- Dorchester High School for Girls, 1925–1953; Also home of Dorchester High School (1901–1925) and Girls' Latin School/Boston Latin Academy (1955–1981)

Location
- Talbot Avenue; Dorchester, Boston, Massachusetts; United States; 42.2903°N 71.0701°W

Information
- Type: Public high school
- Established: 1925
- Headmaster: Alice M. Twigg (1932)
- Faculty: 76 (1932)
- Enrollment: 2,591 (1933)
- Colors: Blue and White
- Yearbook: The Item

Dorchester High School for Girls was a four-year public high school that served students in ninth through twelfth grades, in the Dorchester neighborhood of Boston, Massachusetts, United States from 1925 to 1953.

== History ==
Dorchester High School was founded in 1852 as a co-educational institution in what was then the independent town of Dorchester, Massachusetts. In 1870, the town was annexed by the City of Boston and Dorchester High came under the jurisdiction of Boston Public Schools. A new school designed by the architectural firm of Hartwell, Richardson & Driver was built on Talbot Avenue in Codman Square and opened in 1901. When an additional school building on Peacevale Road opened in 1925, the student body was split. Dorchester High for Boys was created and moved to the new facility, while Dorchester High for Girls was established and remained in the Codman Square building. In a Boston School Committee vote July 27, 1953, the Dorchester High School for Girls was ordered closed. The stated reasons for closure were the School Committee's desire for a co-educational school, integrating trade courses for girls, and student enrollment being under capacity. The student body was transferred to the Peacevale Road location, again establishing a co-educational Dorchester High School.

== Headmasters ==
- James E. Thomas (1925–1929)
- Alice M. Twigg (1929–1950)
- Dorothy M. Lyons (1950–1953)
