= Old South Meeting House =

Museum in Boston, Massachusetts, US

- U.S. National Register of Historic Places
- U.S. National Historic Landmark
- U.S. Historic district – Contributing property
- Boston Landmark
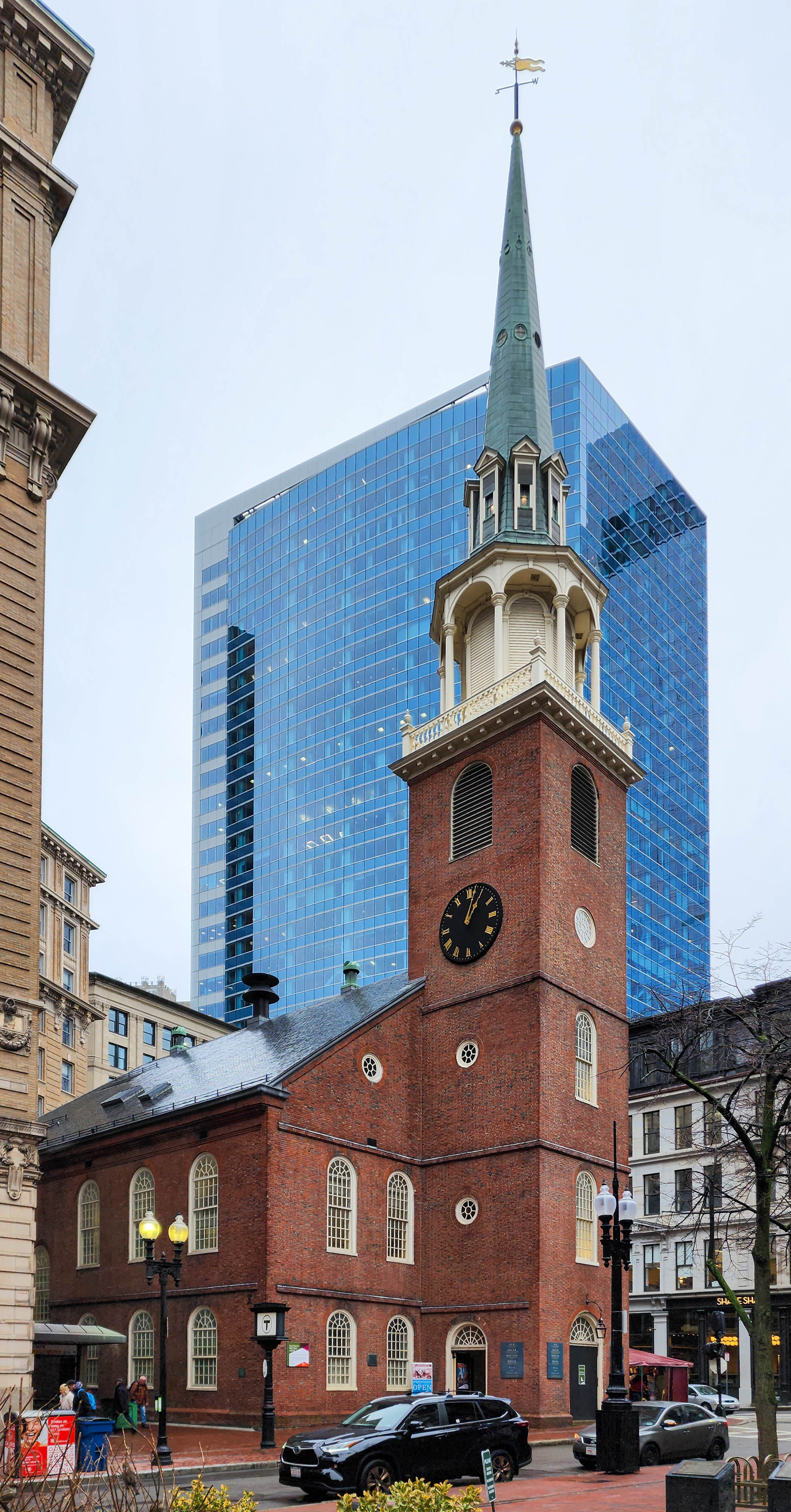
- The Old South Meeting House, 2023

- Location within Boston Location within Massachusetts Location within the United States
- Interactive map of Old South Meeting House
- Location: 310 Washington Street (corner with Milk Street); Boston, Massachusetts, U.S.
- Coordinates: 42°21′25″N 71°3′31″W
- Built: 1729
- Architect: Robert Twelves
- Architectural style: Georgian
- Part of: Boston National Historical Park (ID74002222)
- NRHP reference No.: 66000778

Significant dates
- Added to NRHP: October 15, 1966
- Designated NHL: October 9, 1960
- Designated CP: October 26, 1974
- Designated BOSL: June 25, 2025

The Old South Meeting House is a museum and historic church building at 310 Washington Street, on the corner with Milk Street, in the Downtown Crossing area of Boston, Massachusetts, United States. Built in 1729, the meeting house originally hosted the Congregational congregation of the Old South Church. It was the organizing point for the 1773 Boston Tea Party and later became a free speech symbol for its role as a pre–American Revolution meeting house. The building has served as a museum since 1877 and is operated by Revolutionary Spaces. One of the landmarks on Boston's Freedom Trail, the Old South Meeting House is designated a National Historic Landmark and a Boston Landmark. It is also part of the Boston National Historical Park.

The Old South Meeting House, designed by Robert Twelves and built by Joshua Blanchard, replaced the congregation's first building, the 1669 Cedar Meeting House. It hosted religious services alongside town meetings and speeches, functioning as an overflow space for town meetings too large for Faneuil Hall. In 1775, British troops occupied the interior and gutted it, turning the interior into a horse-riding facility. The interior was rebuilt in 1783, and the building was modified several times in the 19th century. The congregation used the Old South Meeting House until the Great Boston Fire of 1872 and moved to its Copley Square building in 1875.

The old building temporarily served as a post office after the 1872 fire and, following lengthy legal disputes, was sold for scrap in 1876. A group of citizens organized to buy the site and building in what was one of the area's first successful preservation movements. The Old South Association (OSA) took over the building, operating it as a museum. The building underwent additional renovations from the late 19th century onward, including an 1898–1914 overhaul designed by Bigelow and Wadsworth. The pews were reproduced in 1947, the exhibits were overhauled in 1987, and a basement was built during a 1990s renovation. Revolutionary Spaces took over operations in 2020.

The Old South Meeting House is one of the few remaining New England meeting houses with a Georgian exterior and a traditional meeting house–style interior. The building has a mostly rectangular plan with a brick facade. The main entrance is on Washington Street to the west, where there is a protruding tower with a steeple. The rest of the building is two stories high, with large windows and a combination hipped and gable roof. Inside is a square meeting hall with replica pews, a pulpit, and a balcony-level upper gallery. The meeting hall is arranged symmetrically around a secondary entrance on Milk Street, placing the main entrance through the side. Although the building has received mixed architectural reviews, commentators have described its history as highly significant.

== Site ==
The Old South Meeting House is a former church building at 310 Washington Street in the Downtown Crossing area of Boston, Massachusetts, United States, at the northeast corner with Milk Street. The church sits at one end of Boston's former Newspaper Row. At the corner of Washington and Milk streets, the church has a courtyard measuring about 24 by 35 feet (7.3 by 10.7 m). An entrance to the MBTA subway's State station adjoins the building. The Old South Meeting House is a stop on the Freedom Trail, a path connecting historic sites in Boston; sequentially, it is between the Old Corner Bookstore and the Old State House.

The site was gifted by Mary Norton, the widow of former First Church pastor John Norton. The current building's original tenant, the Old South Church congregation, received the land in three pieces between 1669 and 1677. It had formerly been part of the estate of John Winthrop, whose homestead occupied half of the block. The building occupies the former site of Winthrop's garden.

== Church usage ==
=== History ===
The Old South Meeting House is the second building of the Old South Church congregation (now located at Copley Square). The congregation was founded in May 1669 by Congregationalist dissenters from the First Church. It was known as the Third Church to distinguish it from the First and Second Congregational churches in the city.

==== Context and development ====
The congregation's first meeting house or church building, the Cedar Meeting House, was built in 1669 at the corner of Washington and Milk streets. This structure was also called the South Meeting House, since it was south of the North Meeting House. It was cited as measuring 75 by 51 feet (23 by 16 m) wide. The congregation's first pastor was Rev. Thomas Thacher, a physician who published the first medical pamphlet in Massachusetts. The congregation began accepting women members in 1674 and, under duress from Governor Edmund Andros, hosted Church of England services in the 1680s. Its members included future U.S. Founding Father Benjamin Franklin, who was baptized at the building in 1706. After the First Church's building was destroyed by the Great Boston Fire of 1711, the Third Church offered them the Cedar Meeting House. When the now-defunct New South Church was formed in 1717, the Third Church became known as the Old South Church. The congregation was known as the Old South Society.

A new meeting house was proposed under the combined ministries of Joseph Sewall (serving 1713–1769) and Thomas Prince (serving 1718–1758). By then, the existing meeting house could no longer accommodate the congregation and, as workers later found, was seriously deteriorated. The congregation decided on a new building in 1727, voting 41–20 to demolish the Cedar Meeting House. A building committee was appointed the next year to construct a brick structure. The old building was demolished during March 2–3, 1729; work on the new building started on March 31, and the floors were laid by April 24. Services were temporarily hosted at the First Church. The new church opened in April 1730, with the first recorded service taking place on April 26 of that year. It was built by Joshua Blanchard (who later worked on Faneuil Hall) and designed by Robert Twelves. The church was then at the southern end of the town of Boston; commercial development to the south had yet to be built, and the land to the west and east was mostly residential.

==== Mid-18th century: Pre-Revolutionary era ====
As built, the Old South Meeting House had a mostly rectangular plan, with a protruding tower on Washington Street. Although the meeting hall faced south toward Milk Street, congregants entered through this tower, effectively forcing them to enter through the sides. It had a large capacity for the era, being able to accommodate 5,000 people. The meeting hall's main level was surrounded by two tiers of galleries. The meeting hall originally had box pews, like other New England meeting houses; the design allowed the pews to retain heat during the winter. The pews bore the names of their owners, who were assigned different seating locations based on their demographics and social standing, The pews faced a "tub" pulpit with a sounding board above it. The seats closest to the pulpit were reserved for elderly members, while deacons and church elders sat beneath the pulpit, above the main level of seats. Two balconies contained seating for lower-class residents and teenagers, along with African American members. The congregation had at least 122 enslaved members, including Phillis Wheatley, who later became the first published African-American poet.

The building hosted services on Sundays and speeches on Saturdays. The meeting hall lacked a clock in its early years; although an hourglass was used for timekeeping, ministers sometimes gave speeches for several hours straight. One of its first events took place in 1730, when residents gathered to hear notable speakers for the centenary of Boston's founding. A bell, donated by the estate of deceased seaman Timothy Cunningham, was installed in 1731 and was regularly rung for meetings and civic events, as well as at 5 a.m., 11 a.m., and 9 p.m. daily. In the building's early years, Prince maintained a collection of documents in the church's steeple; the collection was later donated to the Boston Public Library. The church's first organ was installed in 1745, and the earliest records of repairs to the building date from 1765. A clock was added to the tower by 1770, (Note: One source cites the clock as having been installed in 1756, while another dates the clock to 1766.) having been installed because of the bell's presence. The clockmaker, Gawen Brown, donated it to the congregation, and the Boston government paid Brown for the clock in 1774. The congregation moved to install footstoves in the early 1770s, reversing a decision made by previous pastors, who had refused to install footstoves in the belief that they were dangerous.

The Old South Meeting House frequently hosted town meetings as well. The events were frequently raucous, to the disdain of Britons in Boston, and many of them directly influenced the American Revolution. Starting in 1768, it was used as an overflow space for events that could not fit in Faneuil Hall, Boston's town hall. The very first such event was a speech James Otis Jr. gave on June 21, where he denounced the British Parliament's attempts to tax the colonies and the use of writs of assistance by Boston customs officials. After the Boston Massacre on March 5, 1770, local residents gathered at the church, successfully demanding that troops be relocated to Boston Harbor. Until the Revolutionary War, lectures were hosted at Old South on the anniversary of the massacre, with James Lovell, Benjamin Church, John Hancock, and Joseph Warren giving the orations. On December 16, 1773, a crowd of 5,000 to 7,000 people met at Old South to hear Massachusetts House of Representatives clerk Samuel Adams speak against the Tea Act. After the meeting, a group raided three tea ships in what became known as the Boston Tea Party. At the Boston Massacre's fifth anniversary in 1775, Warren gave a speech to a crowd that included Hancock and Adams; when a group of British officers came in, Adams gave them front-row seats.

==== Revolutionary and post-Revolutionary era ====
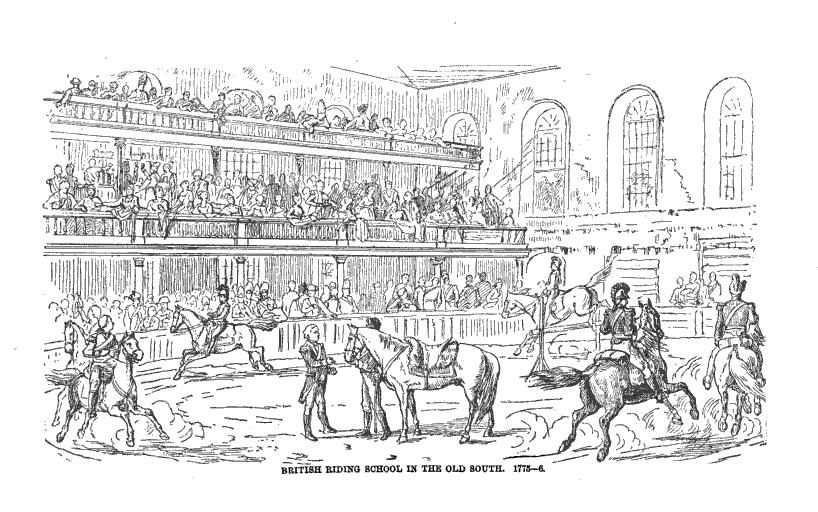
Samuel Birch leading the 17th Light Dragoons in the Old South Meeting House

In 1775, the building was occupied by British troops as retaliation for its role in the Patriot movement. Major-general John Burgoyne ordered his troops to remove the building's decorations. They gutted the interior (except for the eastern portion of the meeting hall's gallery), filled it with dirt, and used the interior to practice horse riding. The pews and pulpit were removed and burned; only four sets of pews survived. Soldiers also looted several items from the building, including William Bradford's Of Plymouth Plantation (1620), a Pilgrim manuscript stored in the church's tower.

The British evacuated Boston in 1776, after which the plan for rebuilding the interior of the church was drawn by Thomas Dawes. The Continental Army commander-in-chief, George Washington, observing Old South's interior after the evacuation, commented that he "thought that the British, who had so much respect for their own churches, would have had more respect for those of others". The church lacked funds to renovate the building for seven years, and in the meantime, they met in King's Chapel. Following a renovation in 1783, the building was reopened on March 2 of that year. The building was largely returned to its original design, while a new pulpit and pews were installed. The steeple was fixed in 1798, and the church first developed stores on its land that year.

==== Early and mid-19th century ====
A brick pavement was added beside the church along Milk Street in 1805. A parsonage was added on Milk Street two years later, followed shortly afterward by a vestry. In addition, a wine-glass shaped pulpit was installed in 1908. The brick facade was painted for the first time starting in 1814, and the protruding entrance on Milk Street was reduced in size about that time. The next year, the building's original bell broke, while it was being used to call in a fire alarm; a second bell was cast by London bell manufacturer Thomas Mears soon afterward. An organ was brought from London in 1822, and the building received new windows and furnaces two years after that. A subcommittee of the congregation recommended further modifications in 1828, including new doors; the subcommittee also ordered window blinds in 1832.

In 1844, the Old South congregation offered to let the Second Church use their meeting house while the latter's structure was being rebuilt. The Second Church accepted this invitation. The congregation incorporated as the Old South Church in Boston in 1845, which took over the real estate. That year, the pastor's house on Milk Street was demolished and replaced with stores. The congregation also repaired and painted the steeple, and they added granite doorways to Milk and Washington streets, during the late 1840s. The steeple was sheathed in copper, and iron bracing was installed inside. The deck under the steeple's bell was also repaired after workers found that it was substantially deteriorated.

The first American YMCA was founded at Old South in 1851, and the building was renovated in 1857. The upper gallery was narrowed, and new iron columns were installed under the gallery. The ceiling was decorated, and the pulpit lowered and considerably changed. The renovation also included new trompe-l'œil wall panels, organ, and chandelier. The changes fit in with the Victorian era tendency toward more ornate decorations; the minister at the time, George Blagden, wanted the changes to "venerate the past" without restricting the congregation's ability to operate in the present. During the American Civil War, the Old South Meeting House was again used for discussions, debates, and event coordination. A tablet, commemorating the British occupation, was installed above the Washington Street entrance in 1867.

=== Ministers ===
The following ministers served the congregation while they met at the Old South Meeting House and its predecessor buildings:

| Minister | Start date | End date | Ref |
|---|---|---|---|
| Thomas Thacher | 1670 | 1678 | |
| Samuel Willard | 1678 | 1707 | |
| Ebenezer Pemberton | 1700 | 1717 | |
| Joseph Sewall | 1713 | 1769 | |
| Thomas Prince | 1718 | 1758 | |
| Alexander Cumming | 1761 | 1763 | |
| Samuel Blair | 1766 | 1769 | |
| John Bacon | 1772 | 1775 | |
| Joseph Eckley | 1779 | 1811 | |
| Joshua Huntington | 1808 | 1819 | |
| Benjamin B. Wisner | 1821 | 1832 | |
| Samuel H. Stearns | 1834 | 1836 | |
| George W. Blagden | 1836 | 1872 | |
| Jacob M. Manning | 1857 | 1872 (Note: Served the congregation until 1882.) | |

== Proposed demolition and preservation ==
=== New building, 1872 fire, and aftermath ===
By the 1870s, Bostonians were increasingly moving to the newly-developed Back Bay neighborhood, and other congregations were constructing churches there. The Old South congregation was also looking to relocate, having acquired a site in the Back Bay in 1869. By then, Washington Street was congested and difficult to access. The congregation initially built a small chapel in the Back Bay and hired Cummings and Sears to design a new church building on Boylston Street. The new building was dedicated in December 1875. At that point, the Old South congregation removed all objects that could physically be transported out of the meeting house. These included a chandelier and the steeple's bell.

Because the congregation had received the old site's land through a donation rather than a land grant, any potential sale needed government approval. The congregation voted to request approval from the Massachusetts General Court (the state legislature) in April 1872. This was toward the end of that year's legislative session, so nothing happened at the time. On November 9, 1872, the Old South Meeting House narrowly avoided destruction in the Great Boston Fire. First responders extinguished sparks on the church's roof and placed wet carpets and blankets on nearby buildings to stop the fire's spread. Fire engines came from as far as 60 miles (97 km) away to prevent the church from burning down. After the fire, the congregation met in the Freeman Place Chapel. Troops were temporarily quartered inside the old meeting house, overseeing the cleanup effort, and the meeting house held its final service for these troops. The United States Post Office Department asked the congregation's permission to use the church, since the previous post office building was unusable due to the fire. A short-term lease was approved in December 1872, despite the congregation's request that all restrictions on the building be removed. John W. Lewis oversaw its renovation for post office use. A pair of brick additions flanking the tower were built, while the interiors were converted into various post-office departments. The Boston Daily Globe wrote that the building bore "signs of a desecration" as a result of these modifications. The Old South Meeting House post office opened in February 1873, operating for two years. The congregation offered the old church (but not the land) to the Massachusetts Historical Society, which lacked the funds.

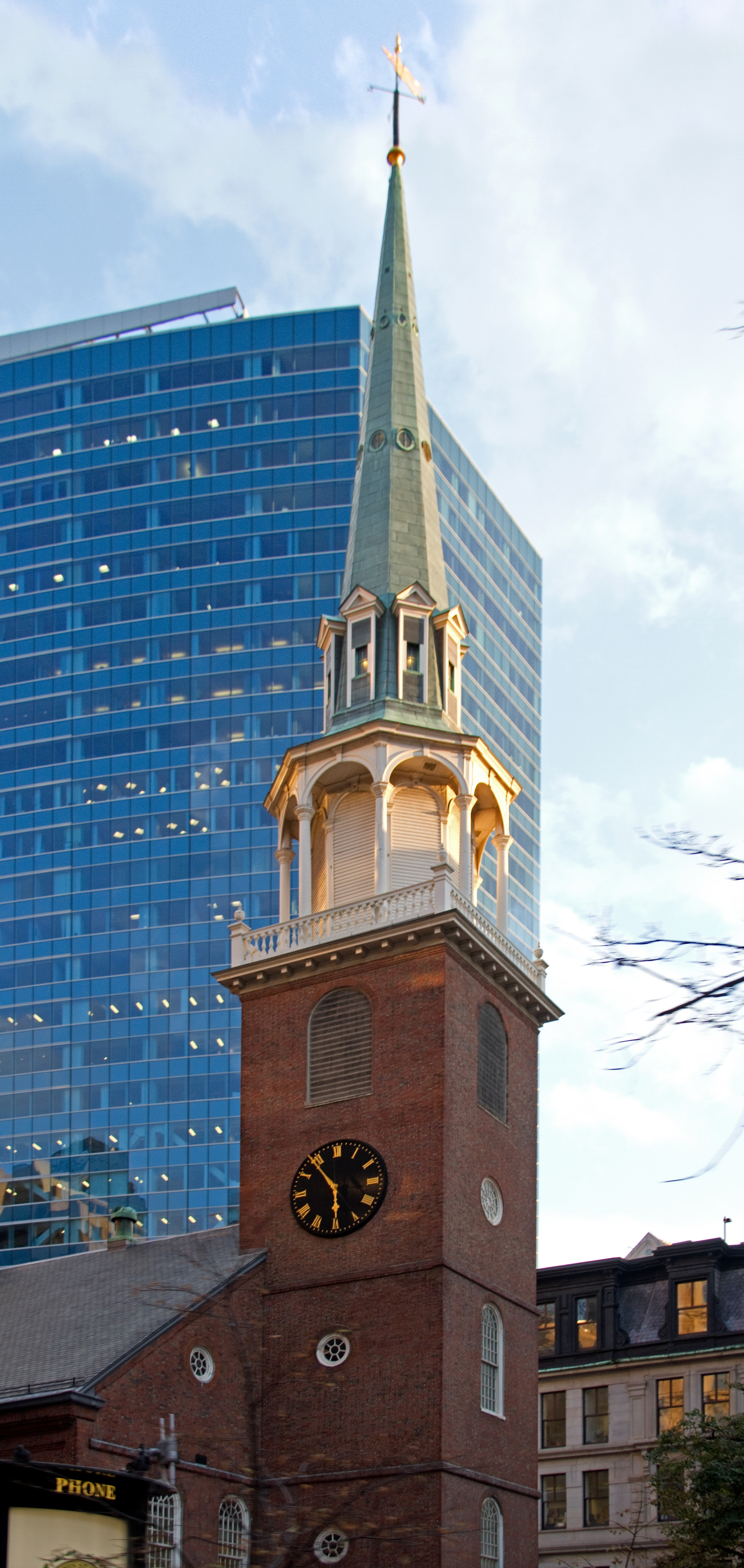
The clock on the church's tower was taken down in June 1876, prompting efforts to save the building.

The idea of selling the Old South Meeting House was debated for three years. Some congregants initially tried to prevent the sale from going through; later on, the general public also organized in opposition. Charles Francis Adams Jr., who opposed the sale, accused proponents of seeing only "the inconvenience to themselves and their families of attending religious services in it once a week". Other opponents wanted to preserve the building primarily for its historical value. The congregation again endorsed selling the building in October 1873. The next year, the General Court referred a decision on the building's disposition to the Massachusetts Supreme Judicial Court, after which the congregation voted to sell the old building and land. The case was argued before the Supreme Court in June 1875, and the court ruled in October that the congregation lacked sufficient authority to sell the building on its own. The Supreme Court ruled in May 1876 that a sale could proceed. One religious publication retrospectively called the dispute "a very annoying and expensive, and at the same time very educative, struggle" for the Old South congregation's rights to dispose of their own property. The congregation planned to demolish the building for street-widening, then sell the remaining land.

=== Preservation efforts ===
The building was sold for $1,350 on June 8, 1876, (Note: Equivalent to $37,000 in 2025) and the clock on the church's tower was taken down almost immediately. This quickly prompted efforts to save the church. Compared with the later effort to preserve the publicly-owned Old State House, the Old South Meeting House preservation effort was more difficult because of the need to buy out the prior owner. A local business, George W. Simmons & Son, obtained a weeklong moratorium on demolition and mounted a banner on the tower, exhorting passersby to raise $100,000. (Note: Equivalent to $2,721,000 in 2025) Many congregants opposed the old church's continued preservation, and there were several proposals to redevelop the site and erect a monument there, or to rebuild the church atop a new building's roof.

At a meeting in the old church on June 14, the abolitionist Wendell Phillips pleaded for the building's preservation, suggesting that it be used as a "mechanics' exchange". During that meeting, a preservation committee was established with Massachusetts governor Alexander H. Rice as its chairman. The committee obtained a 30-day extension of the demolition moratorium, raising $116,000 during that time. (Note: Equivalent to $3,156,000 in 2025) When the moratorium was about to expire that July, the congregation's standing committee offered to sell the building and site for $420,000. (Note: Equivalent to $11,429,000 in 2025) Ultimately, groups of women helped ensure the Old South Meeting House's preservation. On July 19, several women acquired the structure itself for just $3,500; (Note: Equivalent to $95,000 in 2025) the underlying land, which remained to be obtained, was significantly more expensive. The group could not obtain city funds due to the short deadline for acquiring the land. Accordingly, the women proposed moving the building to a site near Old South's new Back Bay church. Mary Hemenway, whose wealthy husband E. A. H. Hemenway had just died, offered $100,000 toward the building's cost. (Note: Equivalent to $2,721,000 in 2025) The preservation effort also attracted support from figures such as the poets Louisa May Alcott, Julia Ward Howe, and Ralph Waldo Emerson.

In September 1876, the congregation agreed to sell the land for $400,000. (Note: Equivalent to $10,884,000 in 2025) The New England Mutual Life Insurance Company offered a $225,000 mortgage, while R. M. Pulsifer covered the remaining $75,000. (Note: The mortgage is equivalent to $6,122,000, while the remaining price is equivalent to $2,041,000 in 2025) The sale was finalized on October 11 or October 12, with the congregation imposing restrictions prohibiting commercial use and Sunday operations for thirty years. Religious use of the building was also prohibited. The Old South Meeting House was among the first successful preservation movements in Boston and New England. One source called it "Boston's greatest contribution to American preservation".

== Museum use ==
In 1877, the General Court passed legislation incorporating the Trustees of the Old South Meeting House in Boston. The legislation was spurred by the preservation group's reluctance to accept the congregation's terms. The Old South Association (OSA), which was established in May 1877, took over the Old South Meeting House. The building thus became one of the U.S.'s first American history museums. The OSA's board included 21 members, including two members of the original Boston City Council and its successor, who were appointed every year.

The meeting house is part of the Boston National Historical Park, operated by the National Park Service (NPS), though it remains privately owned. Revolutionary Spaces, the OSA's successor, has owned the building since 2020. The museum has tours and exhibits about the meeting house's history. The museum charges admission and sells combination tickets that include the Old State House. It hosts free-admission days for local students and families through the Boston Family Days program. The Old South congregation returns to Old South Meeting House once a year just before Thanksgiving.

=== Early years ===
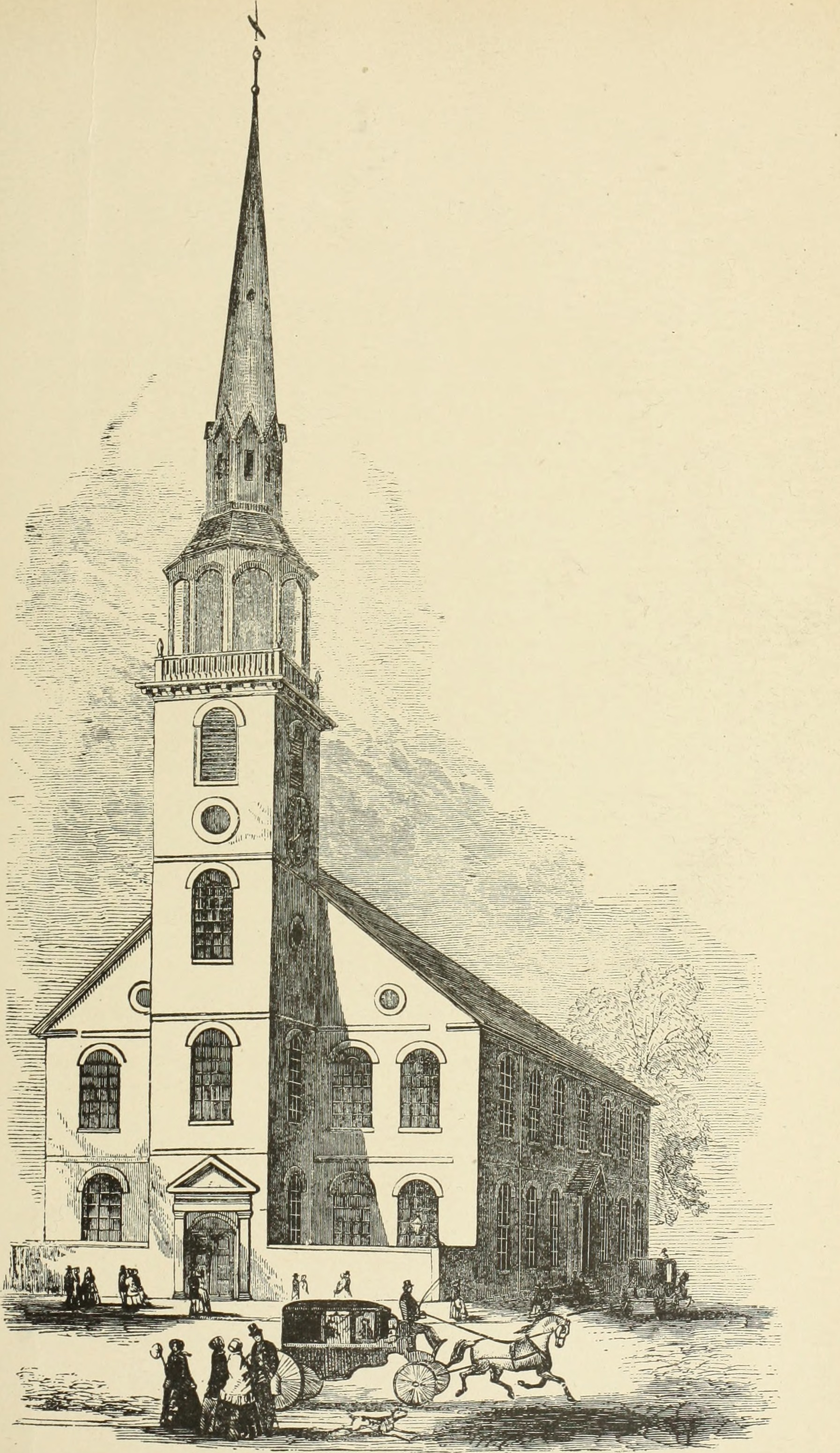
1882 sketch of the Old South Meeting House

During 1877, the OSA attempted to obtain state funding, eminent domain, and a tax exemption; the General Court did not approve the funding at the time. The General Court passed a bill in 1878, conditionally approving $10,000 (Note: Equivalent to $292,000 in 2025) if the OSA were able to remove all encumbrances on the property. That year, the OSA built a small brick annex for commercial tenants. The OSA was incorporated in 1879, with the Massachusetts governor, Boston mayor, two appointees of the City Council, and the leaders of various Massachusetts organizations as board members. Preservationists hosted various events during the late 1870s to raise money for the meeting house. These included fairs, lectures, exhibits, balls, and poetry readings. Although the preservationists raised $230,000 in two years, (Note: Equivalent to $6,727,000 in 2025) the income from these events dwindled with each passing year. During the museum's first century, it hosted assorted artifacts and bric-à-brac, with historical artifacts and portraits being displayed there. Documents relating to the congregation, such as lists of congregants' names and books of sermons, were exhibited.

The OSA renovated the Old South Meeting House, removing the brick annexes and reinstalling the wainscoting. In addition, the OSA redecorated the ceiling, uncovered an old window, and fixed structural issues. Initially, the OSA sought to avoid "radical" events like those the church had hosted during the American Revolution. Early events initially consisted mostly of organizational meetings (including those of the Daughters of the American Revolution) and historical commemorations. It also hosted lectures for youth and an essay-writing competition for local high-school students. From 1888 onward, the OSA began reproducing notes and lecture transcripts as part of its "Old South Leaflets" series. The OSA's leadership, mostly composed of older Boston Brahmins, were reluctant to host contentious events; younger members argued that such events should be hosted, citing the church's associations with free speech. The basement was leased to Burnham's Antique Bookstore. The bookstore's patrons included U.S. President Theodore Roosevelt and fireside poets Henry Wadsworth Longfellow, Ralph Waldo Emerson, John Greenleaf Whittier, James Russell Lowell, and Oliver Wendell Holmes Sr..

A statue of writer and sociologist Harriet Martineau was dedicated at the Old South Meeting House in 1883. The original wooden wainscoting was returned to the meeting house in 1886, and one of the original chandeliers fell from the ceiling and was destroyed the following year. The OSA took full ownership of the land from the congregation in 1889; it also took over part of the adjacent sidewalk on Milk Street as a privately owned public space. The city government retained ownership of the exterior clock. By the following decade, one source wrote that the building had "become a historic center of influence" because of its exhibits and events. Boston's aldermen proposed widening Washington Street in 1892, which would have entailed raising the building and constructing an arcade underneath, but the OSA opposed the plans. Although the city could theoretically acquire the entire building through eminent domain, it needed the General Court's permission to build a sidewalk under the steeple.

=== 1890s–1910s renovations ===
Bigelow and Wadsworth substantially renovated the building from 1898 to 1914. Their renovations relied extensively on historical research reports, combining architectural features from numerous periods; details that lacked sufficient documentation were recast in styles that evoked the original design. The OSA allocated $10,000 to repair the roof and reinforce its trusses in January 1899, (Note: Equivalent to $327,000 in 2025) and work on the roof was completed by that July. The floor was also replaced around that time. The city government approved a widening of the adjacent portion of Washington Street in 1902, paying nearly $150,000 in compensation. (Note: Equivalent to $4,510,000 in 2025) The widening would have required constructing a sidewalk arcade through the tower's protruding first-floor vestibule; this was postponed because the city still lacked legislative approval from the General Court, so the sidewalk instead jutted out into the widened street. The OSA accepted an offer to have a statue of Governor John Winthrop installed outside the building, but the statue was ultimately installed elsewhere. The association also installed new windows and doors, similar in design to those at contemporary buildings.

In 1903, the Boston Transit Commission approved plans for a Boston subway line under Washington Street (now the Orange Line). During the Washington Street line's construction, the Old South Meeting House's western facade was underpinned by temporary beams. Subway entrance kiosks for the line's southbound platform were built next to the church, replacing the grass plots adjoining Washington Street. The subway line opened in 1908. The entrances prompted a legal dispute with the owners of the adjacent Old South Building, who had rented part of the land and owned an easement protecting the meeting house's exposure to air and natural light. The office building's owners refused to pay the OSA rent, claiming the subway entrances obstructed the easement; but were ultimately compelled to pay rent in 1912.

Around 1910, the OSA also acquired the 1857 pulpit and a piece of the 1808 pulpit. The building was closed for repairs for one month in 1911, and the pulpits and other old furnishings were added to the meeting hall during that time. The next year, the OSA announced plans to restore the building to its original appearance. A brick wall replaced an iron fence at the corner of Washington and Milk streets, and the OSA removed the ivy covering the facade and repainted the exterior. Bigelow and Wadsworth also replaced the doors and some windows, made the first story fireproof, and lowered the grade of the yard on Milk Street. Burnham's bookstore moved out of the basement in 1913, and sprinkler systems were added the following year. To reduce traffic congestion, OSA treasurer Richard Walden Hale suggested that the city government revisit plans for a sidewalk arcade at the tower's ground level, but Mayor James Michael Curley opposed the suggestion, citing legal and financial issues. Hale continued advocating for the sidewalk arcade plan in subsequent years, and he also helped form the Old South Forum, a lecture series that commenced in 1915 or 1916. A bookstore owner leased the basement in 1919, upon which the upper story of the commercial annex was demolished.

=== 1920s to 1940s ===
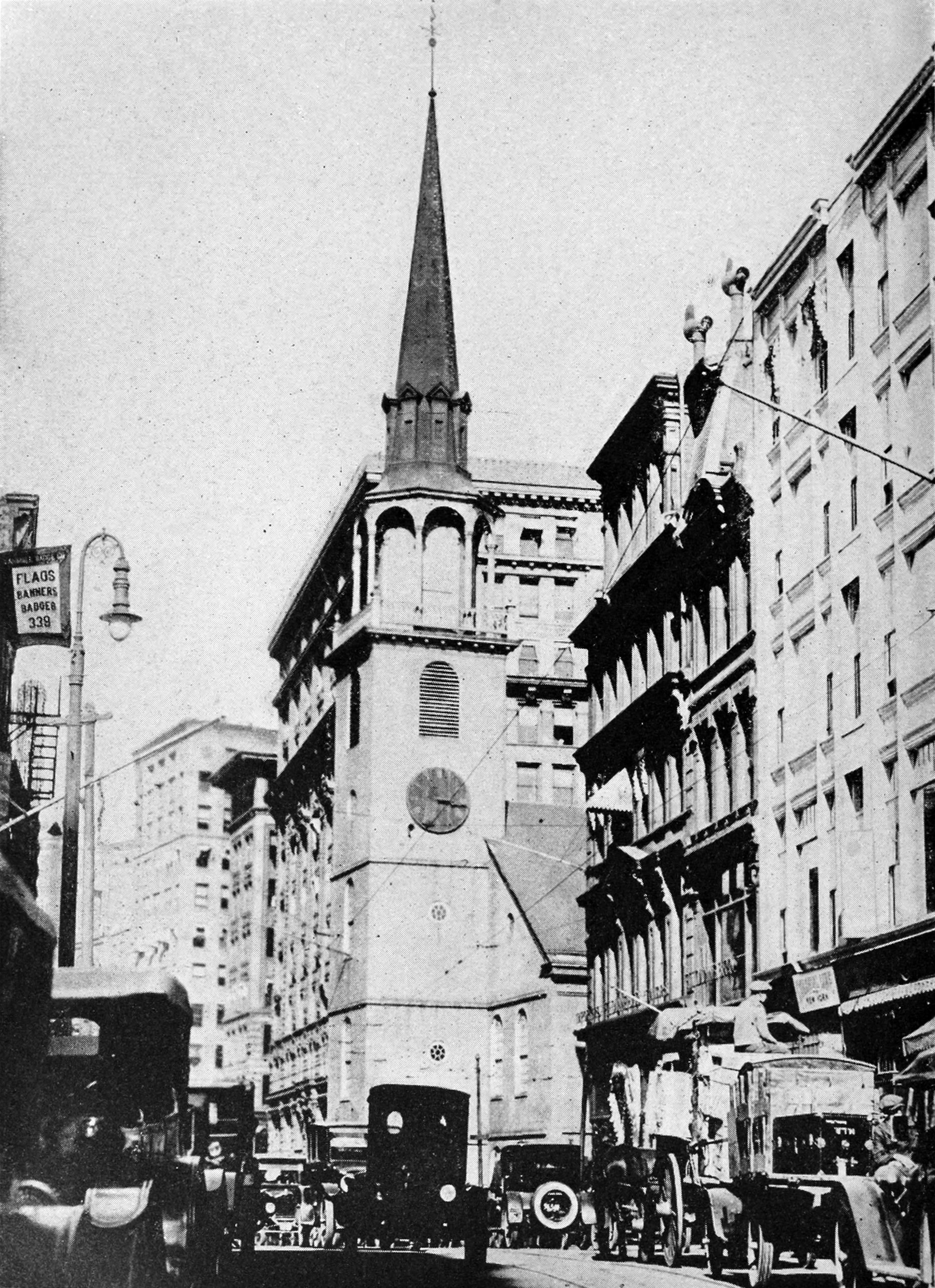
View in 1921

During the early 1920s, the city agreed to convert the meeting house's tower into a sidewalk arcade (although the plans were postponed due to funding shortages), and the OSA also considered replacing the brick wall at Milk and Washington streets due to motorist complaints. The OSA had sole discretion over who could speak in the meeting house until 1925. Despite high demand for the venue, the association was concerned that speeches on unpopular viewpoints would drive the public away. Additionally, the Watch and Ward Society and mayors James Michael Curley and Malcolm Nichols often censored events in the city's public meeting houses. The OSA elected more progressive members in the early 20th century and began focusing on more contentious topics, particularly those regarding First Amendment rights. In 1926, the association began allowing event organizers to host meetings "in the interest of free speech only", requesting that for controversial topics, speakers from all viewpoints be represented. After this policy was enacted, the building hosted a memorial for the anarchist duo Sacco and Vanzetti, which itself elicited debate over free speech. Following continued debate over whether the building should host controversial topics, in 1929, the OSA voted against banning all except "educational, charitable, and religious" meetings. Instead, the association changed its policy the next year, allowing a wider range of events while banning inflammatory protests.

The OSA acquired the building's clock from the city in 1928 and repainted it that year. By then, the clock often broke down and had not been rebuilt in a century. During the early 1930s, the building hosted free lectures and university courses for local residents. Scaffolding was placed around the tower in 1937 after workers found that beetle infestations had damaged the woodwork. The steeple was repaired the next year, and workers created ventilation openings and installed airtight wooden partitions in the steeple's attic. The Old South Forum was discontinued in 1938. By then, there were fewer objections to the OSA's event policy, amid growing acceptance of unpopular viewpoints. Some speakers were still controversial, such as the clergyman Gerald L. K. Smith, who canceled a speech there after being heckled. Lutheran denominations sometimes hosted noontime services during Lent, though it was not used for religious services on Sundays. The pews in the meeting hall's main level were rebuilt in 1947 and dedicated with a religious service. Charles B. Loring designed the seats, erecting replicas of the room's original slip pews after confusing two sets of plans. The area around the main level became an exhibit space. Afterward, no major modifications took place for four decades.

=== 1950s to 1990s ===
By the mid-20th century, the building was open to visitors from June to October. It was open daily except Sundays, when it was closed because of the expense of hiring staff on Sundays. It was still operated as a history museum, charging admission fees of 25 cents to pay for upkeep. The building also hosted events and activities, such as musicals once a month, commemorations of the Boston Tea Party, university-level courses, and occasional religious services. The steeple, which contained the clock mechanism, was not open to visitors. The Old South Meeting House had gained a reputation as a free-speech symbol, and many visitors came to see specific artifacts, such as genuine tea leaves from the Boston Tea Party. Event attendees headed for the New Old South Church sometimes ended up at the old meeting house by mistake. The Old South congregation convened at the meeting house in 1955 for the first time in 80 years.

As part of a late-1960s plan to redevelop the surrounding neighborhood, the Boston Redevelopment Authority proposed converting the adjoining portion of Washington Street into a pedestrian mall and creating a "parklike setting" outside the building. The proposal also included "enhancements" to the building. At the time, the Old South Meeting House extended outward onto that street. In addition, the wall surrounding the corner courtyard was to be removed for a street-widening project; this became School Street Extension, which was completed in late 1972 and connected Milk Street with School Street to the northwest. Because the wall dated only from 1913, there was no opposition to its demolition. The floors were rebuilt in 1970, and the interiors were repainted during that decade after the building received a $20,000 state grant. (Note: Equivalent to $93,000 in 2025) When the building became part of the Boston National Historical Park in 1974, the NPS estimated that it needed $1.05 million in repairs. (Note: Equivalent to $5,326,000 in 2025)

Despite being part of the Freedom Trail, the Old South Meeting House attracted fewer visitors and was less well-known than other Freedom Trail attractions. The OSA thus began raising $200,000 for a multimedia exhibition about the Old South Meeting House's history, installation of which started in 1985. The exhibition opened in 1987 and included reenactments of old sermons, along with replicas of objects used by the congregation. The meeting house also hosted reenactments of the Boston Tea Party, as well as other events and exhibits. The Massachusetts Bay Transportation Authority obtained some of the OSA's land in 1986, to make room for a new elevator entrance to the State station. In the 1990s, the building continued to host speeches, which were broadcast over a new public address system. Even with a reduced capacity of 650, the meeting hall continued to host events such as weddings, lectures, concerts, and stage shows. During that decade, the NPS renovated the building as part of a $45 million program to upgrade several Freedom Trail sites. The Old South renovation, designed by Stahl Associates, cost $7.2 million and involved replacing mechanical and utility systems, making the building accessible, and restoring historical design details. The basement was also expanded. The building reopened in October 1997.

=== 2000s to present ===
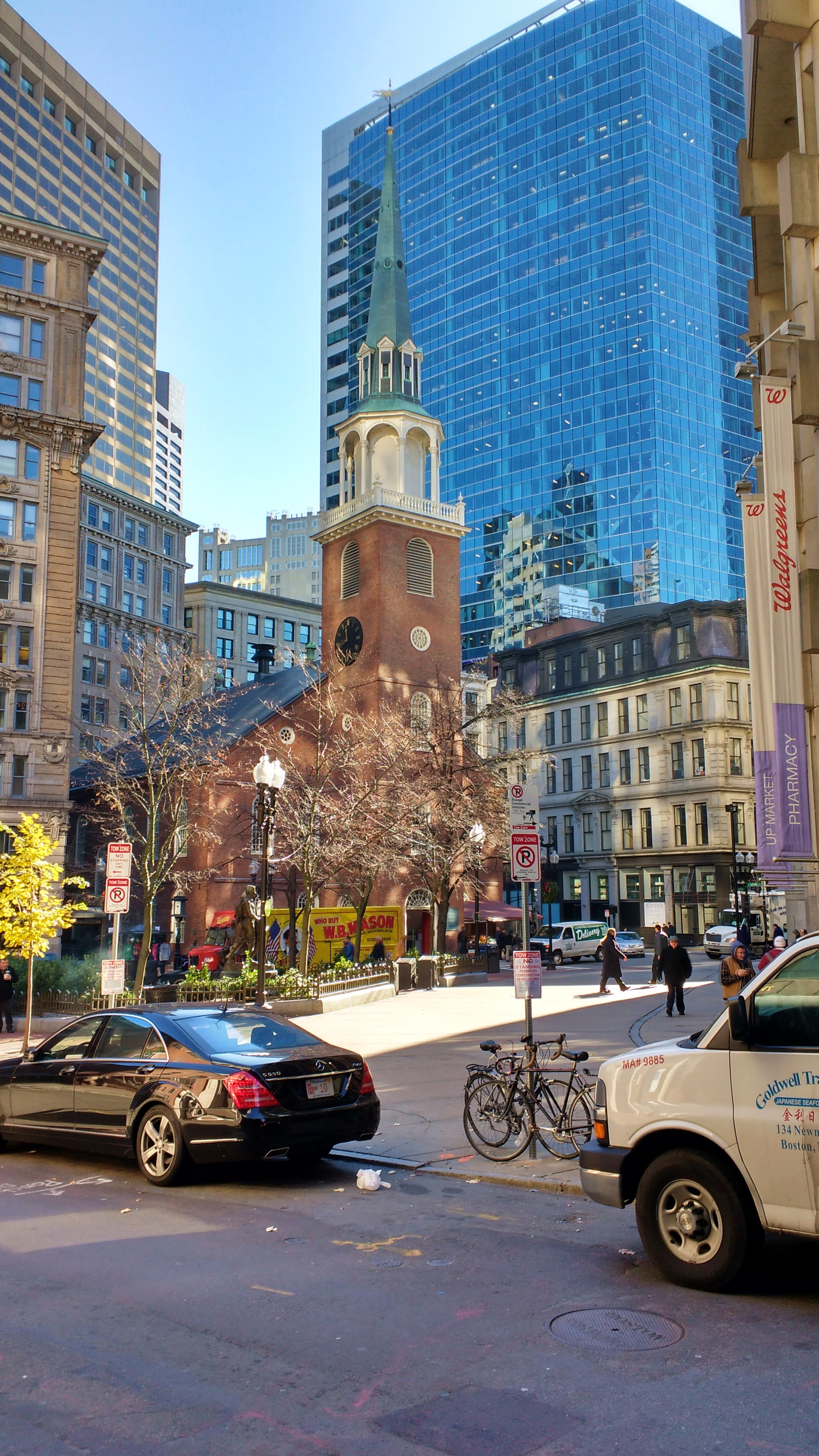
The building seen from School Street in 2015

By the 2000s, nighttime illumination was being planned, and there were concerns that the development of the nearby 33 Arch Street skyscraper would cause vibrations and cast shadows on the Old South Meeting House. Following an anonymous donation, the clock faces were removed for restoration that August. One dial was completely rebuilt, while the other was repaired; the faces were installed in December and cost $50,000. Simultaneously, there were plans to add a bell back to the tower. The Bostonian Society had found that the recently-closed First Baptist Church in Westborough, Massachusetts, contained a bell made by Paul Revere, and the OSA offered to buy that church's bell in mid-2009. The First Baptist Church accepted the offer two years later. The Revere bell was hoisted to the Old South Meeting House's tower in October 2011 and was first rung there in January 2012. While the bell was being procured, the OSA detected additional damage in the exterior, prompting plans for further renovations. An $800,000 exterior renovation, covering the steeple, windows, and woodwork, commenced in August 2013; this project was completed the next year. By then, the museum had 75,000 annual visitors. The interior was repainted in 2016 after the OSA received $112,500 from Millennium Partners, the developer of the nearby Millennium Tower, and $95,000 from the Massachusetts Cultural Facilities Fund.

The Old South Association proposed merging with the Bostonian Society, the Old State House's operator, in 2019; the merger was finalized in January 2020 with the creation of a new organization, Revolutionary Spaces. The merger allowed the Old State House and the Old South Meeting House to coordinate their operations, although the buildings' names remained unchanged. The Old South Meeting House was temporarily closed for part of 2020 due to the COVID-19 pandemic. Revolutionary Spaces renovated the Washington Street entrance in 2022, which included replacing lighting and repairing doors and plaster walls. The next year, U.S. Senator Ed Markey obtained a $480,000 federal grant for repairs, including weatherproofing upgrades. For the United States Semiquincentennial in 2026, Revolutionary Spaces installed audiovisual equipment in the Old South Meeting House to accommodate Ruckus!, an interactive show.

== Architecture ==
The Old South Meeting House is a New England meeting house with a steeple. It is one of the few extant meeting houses that combine a traditional meeting house–style layout and a Georgian exterior. The design also combines American colonial, Colonial Revival, and Victorian architectural elements. Old South congregant Richard Grant White described the building as "the perfect model of a New England 'meeting-house' of the highest style in the olden time". Little is known of Robert Twelves, the building's architect.

=== Exterior ===
The facade is made of brick masonry in Flemish bond; the lowest portion of the facade is a brick water table. The main portion of the building's massing has a largely rectangular footprint, which measures 66–68 feet (20–21 m) wide and 93–95 feet (28–29 m) long. On Washington Street, a tower protrudes from the middle of the facade's western elevation, rising about 80 feet (24 m) with three stories. The tower is square and is one bay wide; there are two bays on either side of the tower, dividing the western elevation vertically into five bays. The eastern elevation has a staircase tower that measures one bay wide on all sides. The north and south elevations are divided vertically into seven bays each. Belt courses run horizontally across the church and its tower above each story. There are three cornerstones in the facade, which bear inscriptions related to the building's construction.

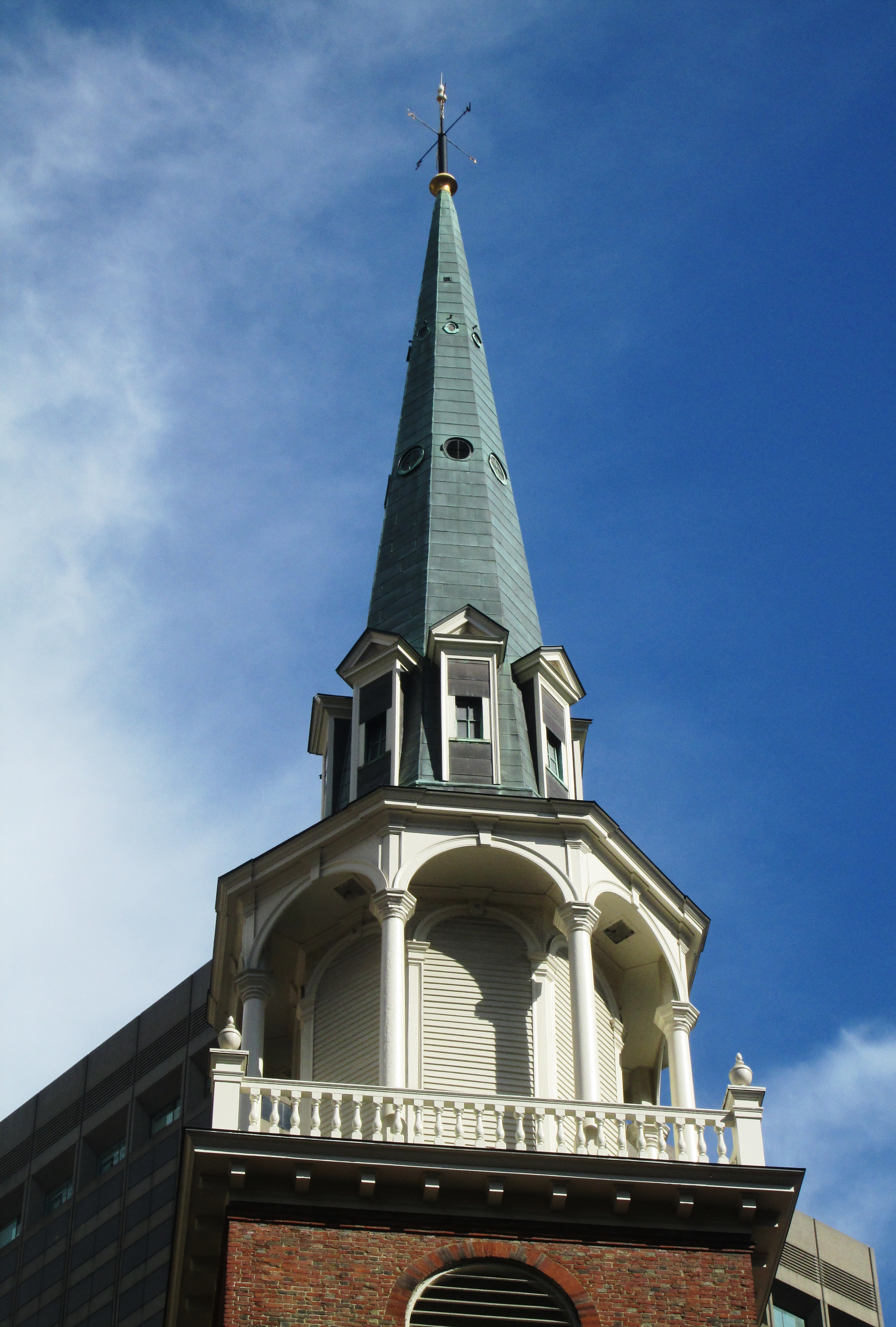
Detail of the balustrade and steeple above the tower

The tower on Washington Street measures 183 feet (56 m) tall, including its steeple. (Note: The steeple is sometimes cited as 180 feet (55 m) high.) It has entrances facing north, west, and south, each with paneled doors, molded frames, and semicircular fanlights. In the late 19th century, the main entrance door was topped by an inscribed tablet, bearing notable dates in the building's history. (Note: The inscription is as follows: "Old South.: Church Gathered, 1669.; First House Built, 1670.; This House Erected, 1729.; Desecrated by British Troops, 1775–6.") The belt courses on the facade are interrupted in the western elevation of the tower, and there are multiple tiers of window openings above the entrances. The second and third tiers of western elevation each have one arched window, above which is a larger oxeye window on the fourth tier. The northern and southern elevations each have a smaller oxeye window on their second and third tiers. The oxeye windows have muntins that radiate from a central circular pane. There are clock faces on the northern and southern elevations' fourth tier, above which the tower has arched louvers on all elevations. The tower facade is capped by a balustrade and a cornice with dentils, above which rises an octagonal steeple. The steeple's apex has a 20-foot-tall (6.1 m) gilded weathervane designed by Thomas and David Drowne, sons of prolific weathervane manufacturer Shem Drowne.

The rest of the building has two tiers of sash windows with semicircular fanlights above them. At the time of construction, such windows were commonplace in New England churches whose congregations dissented from the Anglican Church. Unlike other churches, the sash windows contained clear glass panes rather than stained glass. The first-story sash windows have a 15-over-15 configuration, while the second-story windows are slightly taller, with a 15-over-20 configuration. The northern and southern elevations' windows are slightly wider than those on the western and eastern elevations. The northern elevation's central bay has only one arched window midway between the first and second stories, denoting the pulpit's original location. The basement is partially visible at the building's east end, with increasingly larger windows as the land slopes down to the east. There is also a cornerstone with Joshua Blanchard's initials and the year 1729 on the eastern elevation.

There is a side entrance with a pediment on the southern elevation. Other doorways on the northern and southern elevations lead to the basement. The stair tower to the east has another entrance dating from the late 1830s, with a hipped roof sloping down on all sides. The building's main portion has a gable roof sloping down to the north and south, with slate shingles as well as copper gutters. At its eastern end, the roof slopes to the east like a hip roof; the western end lacks a similar slope, instead terminating at a gable aligned with the middle of the tower.

=== Interior ===
The original layout was based on the old Cedar Meeting House's layout. Over the years, the interior has been redesigned multiple times. The basement contains backroom areas such as education rooms and offices, along with the museum's gift shop and restrooms. The current configuration of the basement dates to the late 1990s, when a subbasement was added. There are entrance vestibules to the south and west, respectively facing Milk and Washington streets. Six steel trusses, dating from 1899, support the roof.

The tower's clock faces are powered by a mechanism dating from no later than 1770, which was constructed by Gawen Brown. The clock is the oldest one in New England that has continuously operated at its original site. The clock mechanism was originally capable of both keeping time and striking a bell, but the strike portion of the mechanism fell into disrepair after the bell was removed in 1875. The mechanism consists of wooden drums, steel axles and pinions, and brass wheels. There were separate weights for the timepiece and the bell strike, which respectively weighed 180 and 230 pounds (82 and 104 kg) and were wound weekly. The current bell, made by Paul Revere in 1801, weighs 876 pounds (397 kg) and was installed in 2011.

==== Meeting hall ====
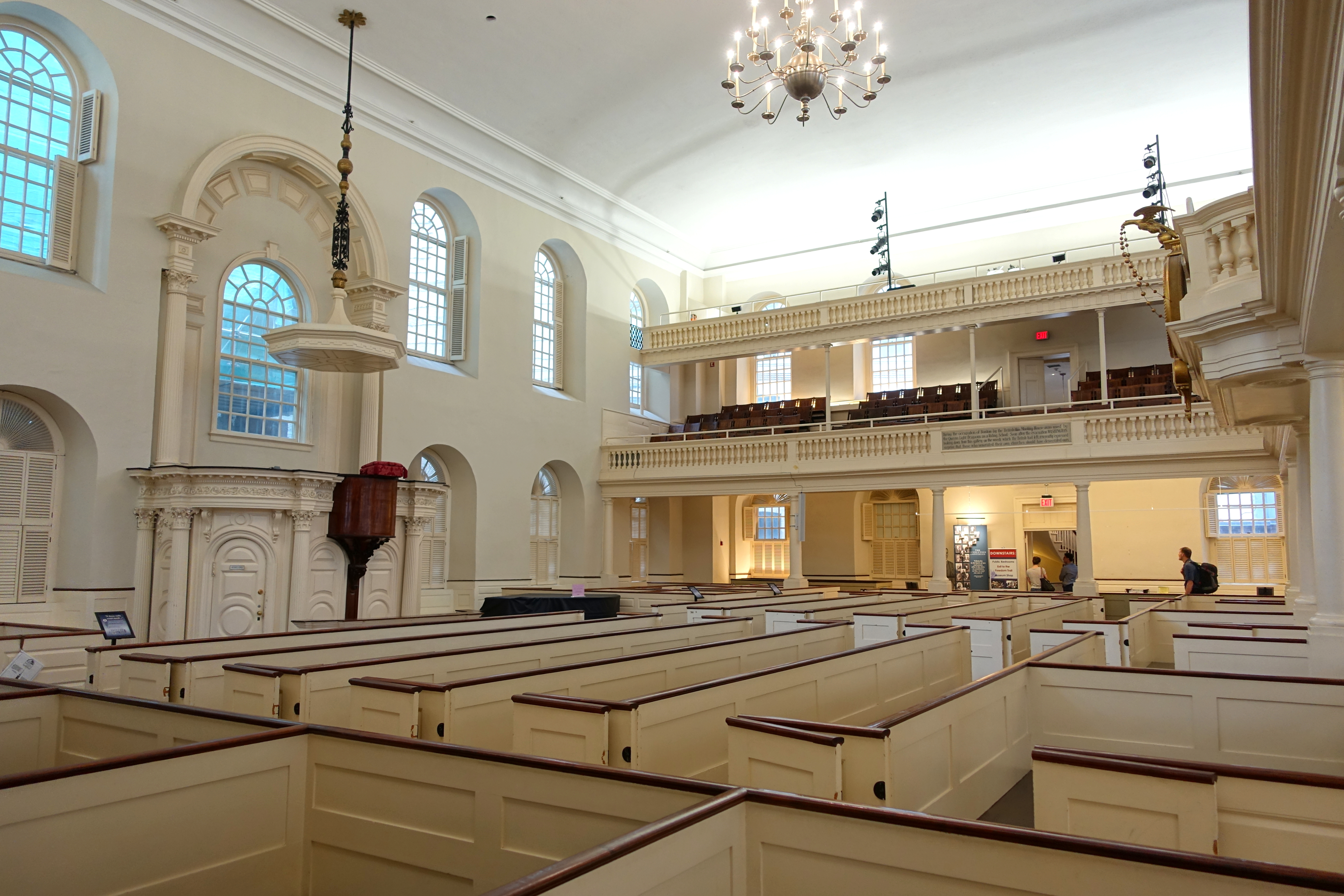
Meeting hall of Old South, 2018

The interior of the meeting hall, a nave, was originally arranged in a "U" shape, with seating on the main level and in a balcony-level upper gallery. The seats were arranged symmetrically around a corridor connecting the Milk Street entrance on the southern wall with the pulpit on the northern wall. The modern museum's layout is a reproduction of the original layout. The main entrance through the Washington Street tower is on the side of the meeting hall; this was similar in layout to 17th-century New England meetinghouses, which were entered primarily from the side. The walls have plaster and wood wainscoting dating from the 19th century.

On the main level, the pews are arranged into rows surrounding the pulpit and are divided by five north–south and two east–west aisles. The meeting hall has unenclosed slip pews near the front and enclosed box pews elsewhere. The windows are recessed from the walls, creating additional seating areas within the window openings, and there are louvered window blinds covering the windows. On all walls except the northern, the main level has a gallery wrapping around the meeting hall; this gallery is supported on Doric columns and has fixed seats. On the eastern and western walls, there are thin steel columns supporting the upper gallery level, which is half the width of the lower gallery. The meeting hall's southeastern corner has a stair connecting with the eastern portion of the upper gallery. There is an additional stair in the Washington Street tower, connecting with the upper gallery's western portion.

There is a high pulpit at the center of the northern wall, facing the aisle that leads to the Milk Street entrance. The pulpit has a semicircular front with carved panels, Corinthian columns, and an elaborate entablature. The pulpit largely dates from 1857, but its lower section is a wineglass-shaped piece of the second (1808) pulpit; the remainder of the 1808 pulpit has been sold off. The walls are topped by large cornices, above which the walls curve inward to form a coved ceiling. An octagonal sounding board is located on the ceiling directly above the pulpit.

== Impact and legacy ==
=== Reception ===
==== Historical commentary ====
The Advance wrote in 1874 that "with one or two possible exceptions... the Old South Meeting-house ... is of greater historic interest than any other building in Boston". Two years later, The Independent wrote that the efforts to demolish the building for pecuniary benefit were short-sighted. After the museum conversion, the San Francisco Chronicle wrote, "Never had a church a more eventful history than this", and The Golden Rule magazine called it "a building dear to every lover of liberty". Due to its history, the building was sometimes called the Temple of Freedom or Sanctuary of Freedom.

Sources in the early 20th century continued to regard it as one of Boston's most significant monuments and a reminder of the fight for freedom in the United States. A writer for The Youth's Companion said in 1910 that the Old South Meeting House, Old State House, and Faneuil Hall were the three old buildings that Bostonians were most proud of. In 1931, the New York Herald Tribune attributed these three buildings and the Park Street Church as "museum pieces in the style of architecture of our own Colonial days". The Chicago Daily Tribune said in 1948 that "there is no church in America which made a greater contribution to the cause of liberty", and The Morning Union likened Old South Meeting Hall's importance to that of Independence Hall in Philadelphia. Speaking about the museum, Newsday called it "the best buy for 25 cents in a long time" in 1968, referencing its admission fee at the time.

In the 2000s, one writer called the building an important setting for the U.S. independence movement, while another called it "the most memorable of the many buildings where religion and politics mixed during the American Revolution". One commentator in 2004 stated that the Old South Meeting House had been preserved mainly because of its historical importance, not for its architecture.

==== Architectural commentary ====
The New York Times in 1877 called the Old South Meeting House a "particularly ugly brick building" that was noteworthy for its history, and the writer Aymar Embury said in 1914 that the building's design "is severely plain, and the spire, while agreeable enough, has nothing of the grace and beauty of the earlier ones of Old North and Trinity Church in Newport". After the adjacent Old South Building was built, the Boston Daily Globe wrote in 1903 that it did not detract from "the pleasing conspicuousness of the Old South church as a landmark". The Society for the Preservation of New England Antiquities wrote in 1923 that the building was architecturally the "finest meeting house in New England", citing its "spire of almost perfect proportions".

A writer for Redbook in 1962 said that the building was a "truly noble pile of red brick surmounted by a pointing white spire", which had become hallowed ground for its role in the American Revolution. In the 2000s, one commentator wrote that the "beauty of the restoration inspires reverence and a hushed silence appropriate to a sacred place", and another said that the "airy, unembellished interior" recreated the ambiance of the meetings hosted there.

=== Landmark designations ===
The building was designated a National Historic Landmark (NHL) on October 9, 1960. It was added to the National Register of Historic Places on October 15, 1966, the day the National Historic Preservation Act of 1966 went into effect. The Old South Meeting House is one of eight sites in the 43-acre (17 ha) Boston National Historical Park, which was designated in 1974. The Boston Landmarks Commission considered designating the building as a city landmark in the late 2010s. The building was designated as a Boston Landmark in 2025; the designation includes the exterior and some interior spaces.

== Gallery ==
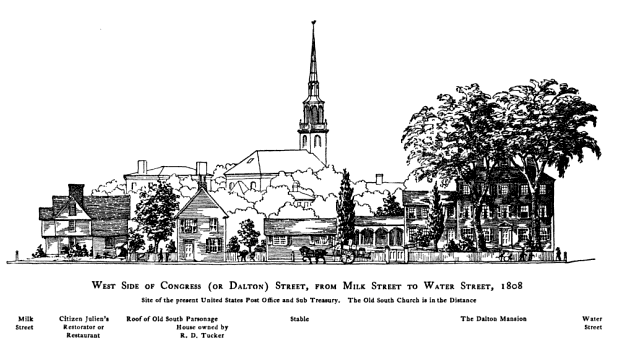
View of Old South from Congress Street in 1808 (conjectural illustration)

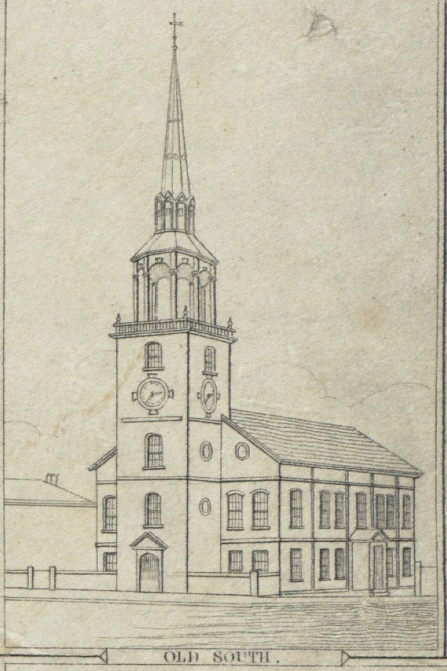
1835

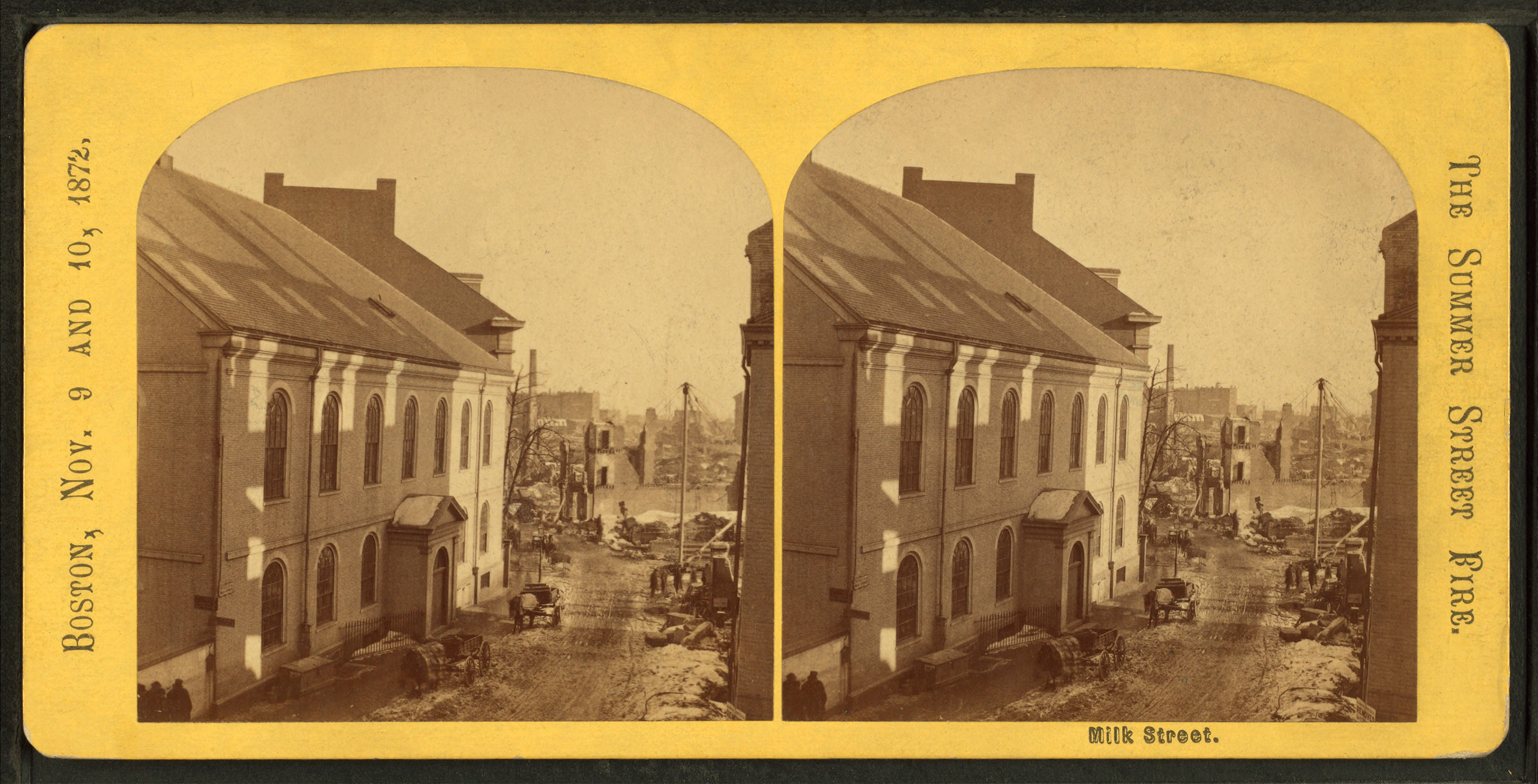
After the fire (Old South at left), 1872

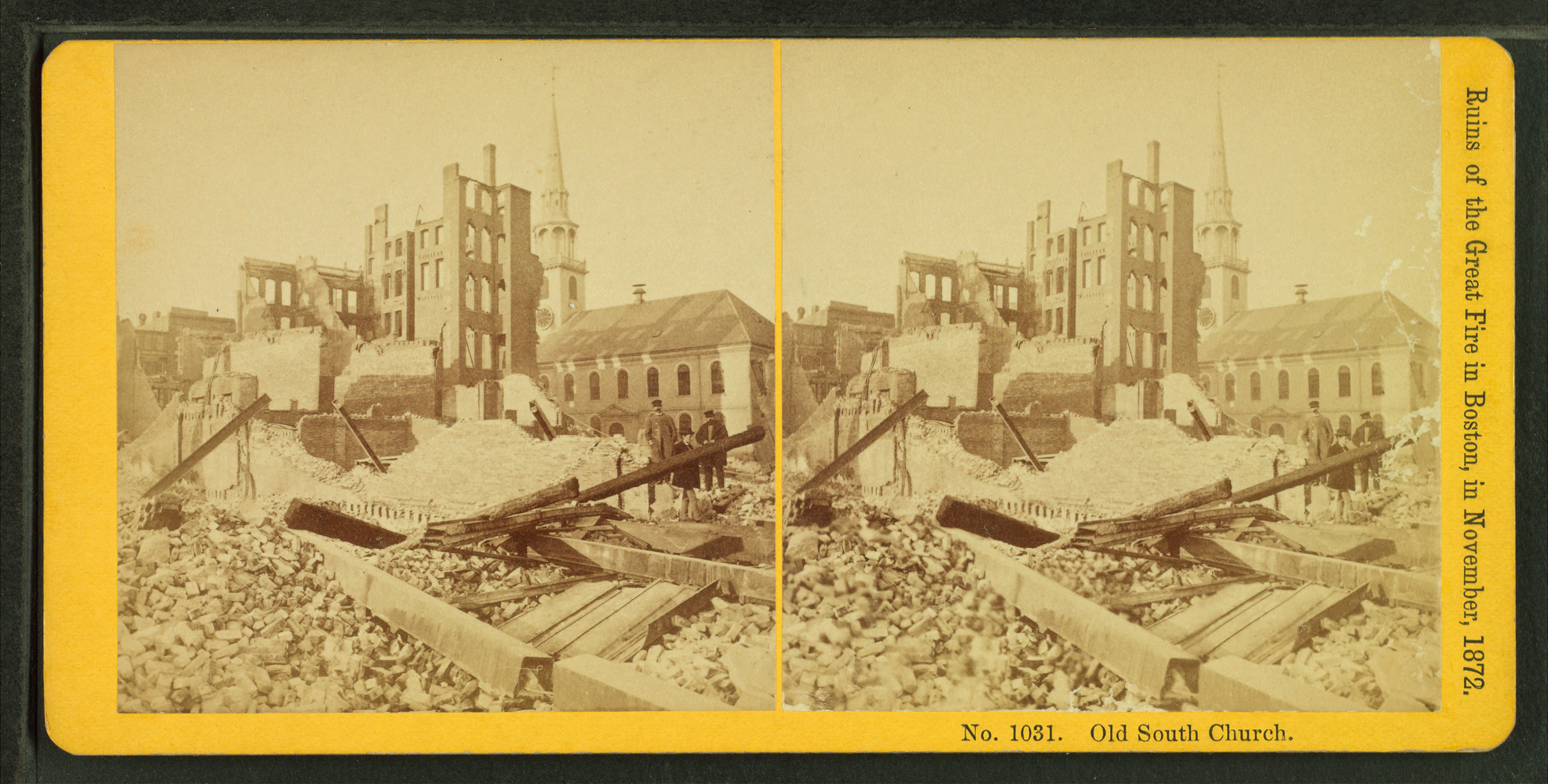
After the fire, 1872

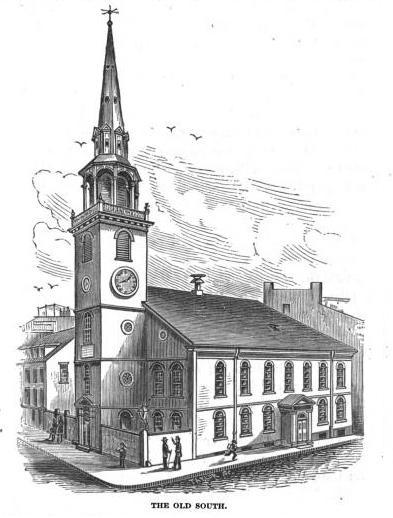
Old South Meeting House, ca. 1877

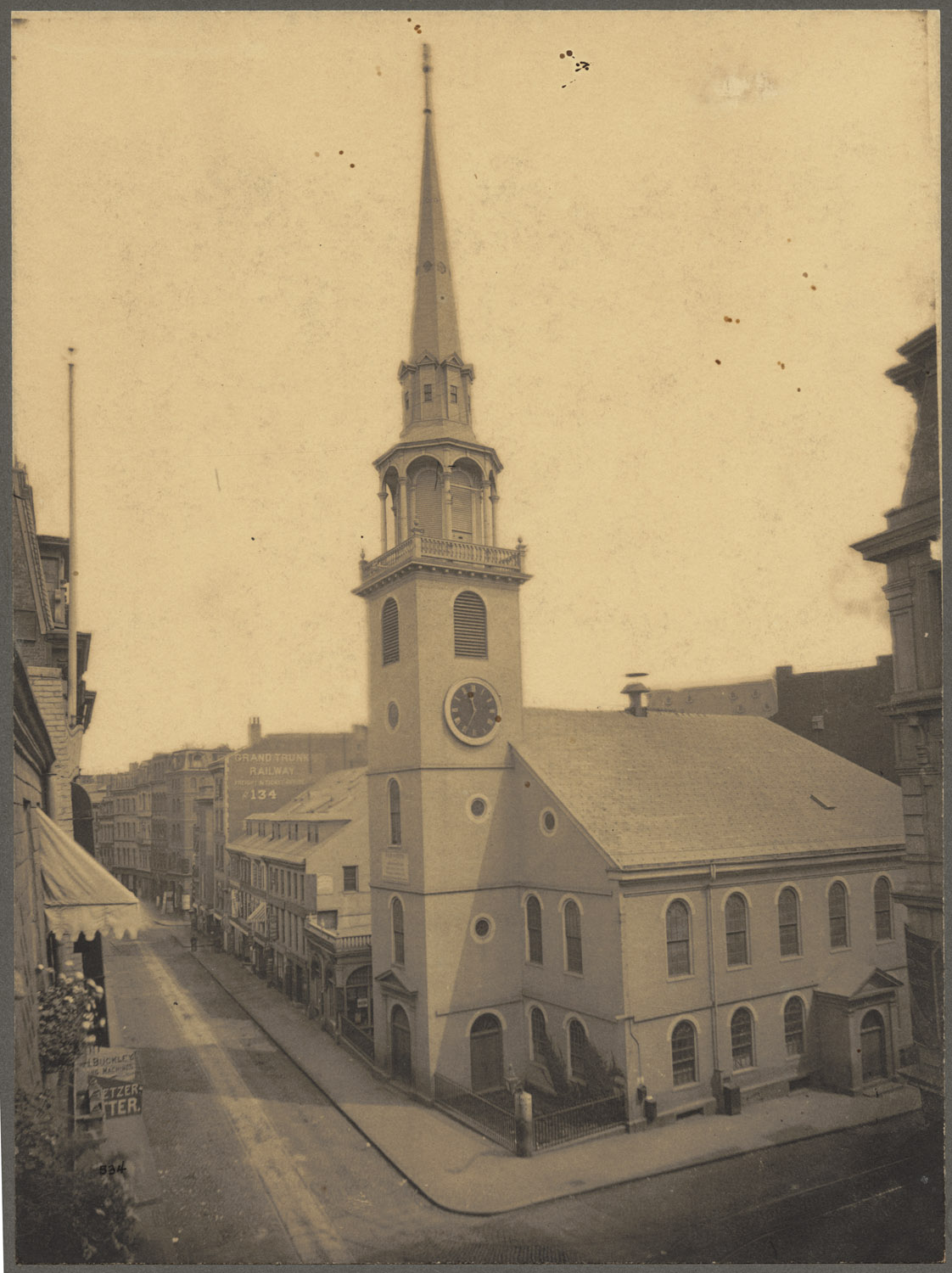
ca.1898

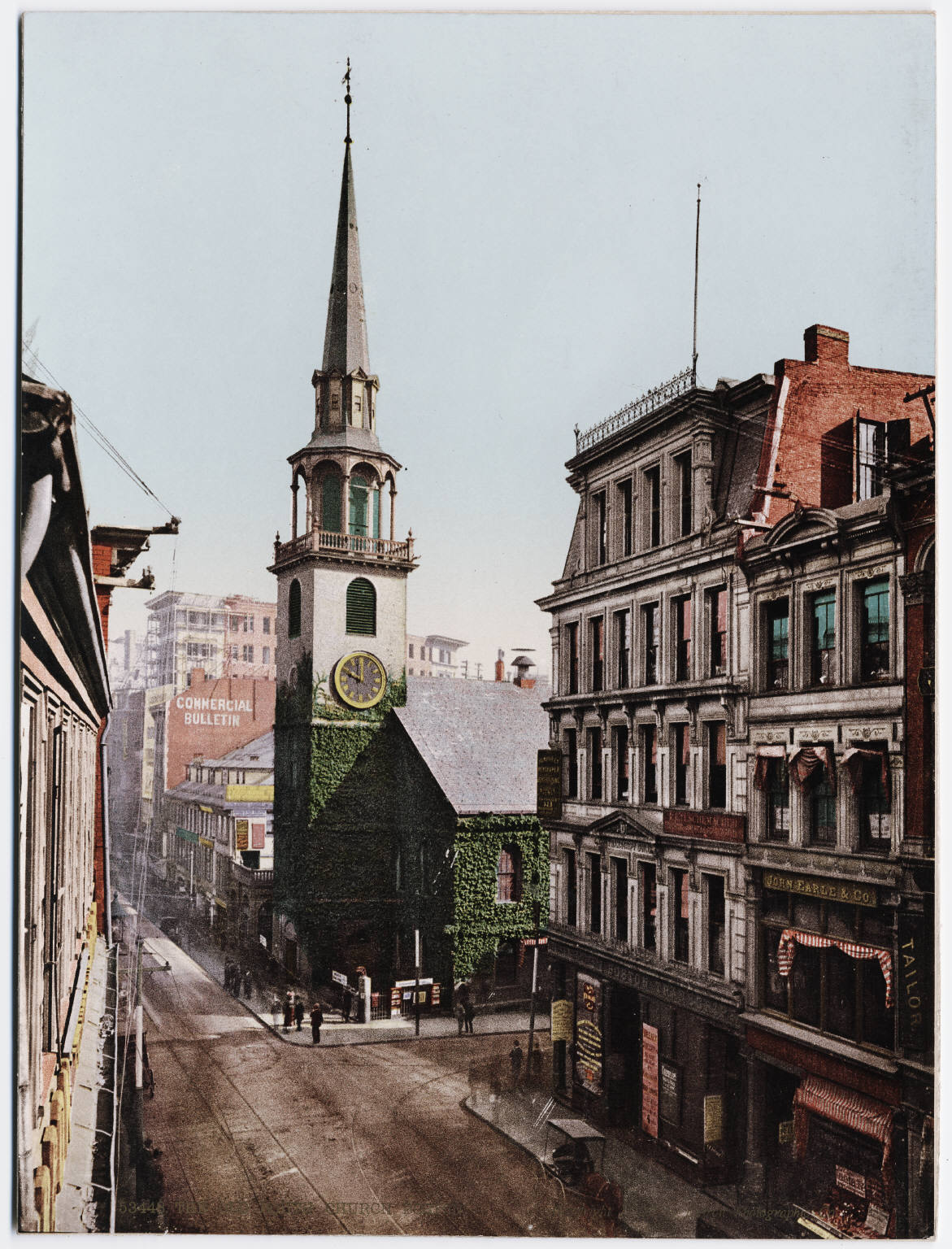
Washington and Milk St., 1900

== See also ==
- List of National Historic Landmarks in Boston
- National Register of Historic Places listings in northern Boston, Massachusetts
- Mary Caroline Crawford – American author and historian (1874–1932)

| Preceded by Old Corner Bookstore | Locations along Boston's Freedom Trail; Old South Meeting House | Succeeded by Old State House |
