= Dorchester High School (Massachusetts) =

School in Massachusetts, United States

Coordinates: 42°17′6.93″N 71°4′33.53″W

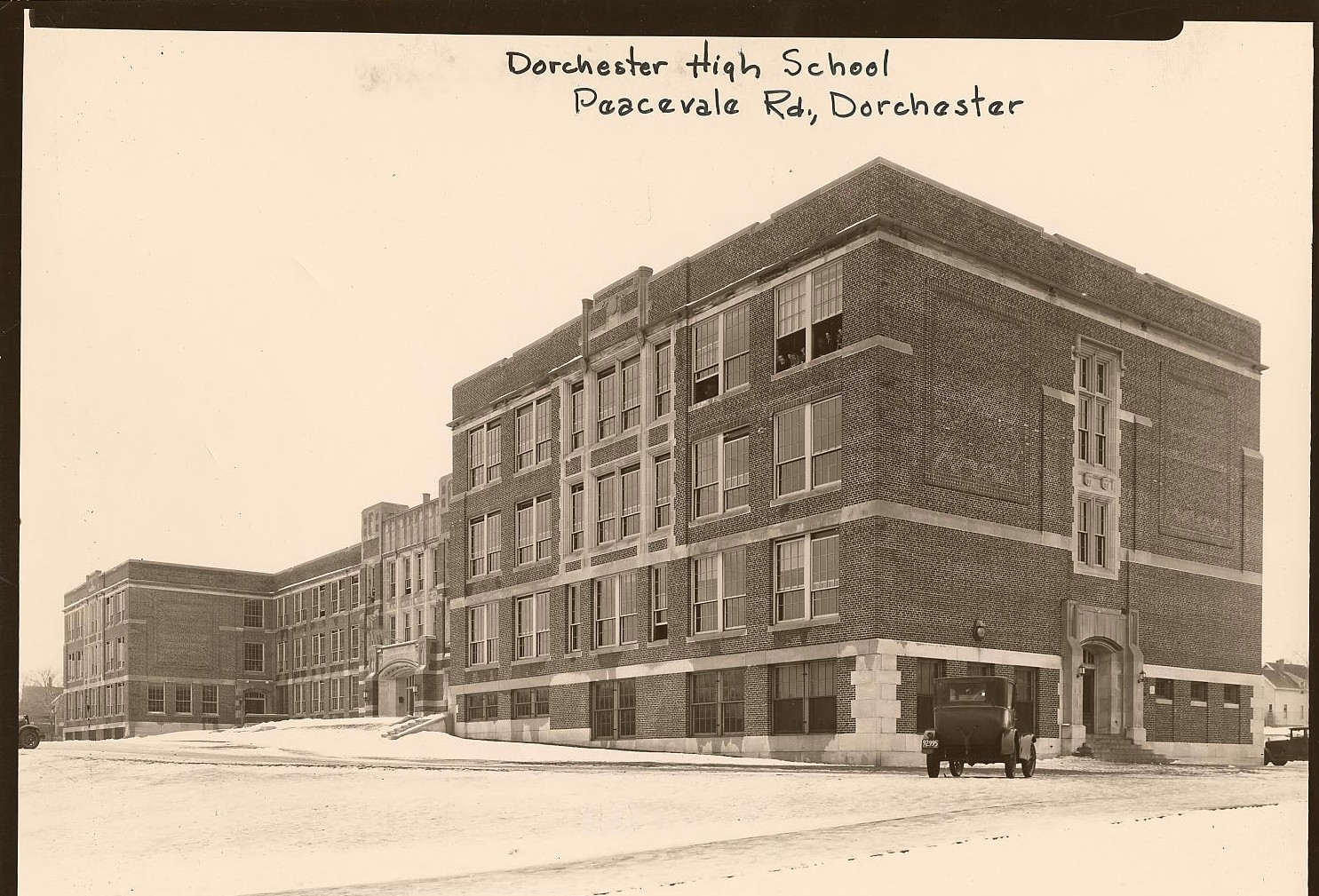
- Third home of Dorchester High School, 1925 - 2003 - current home of TechBoston Academy

Information
- Established: 1852
- Closed: 2003

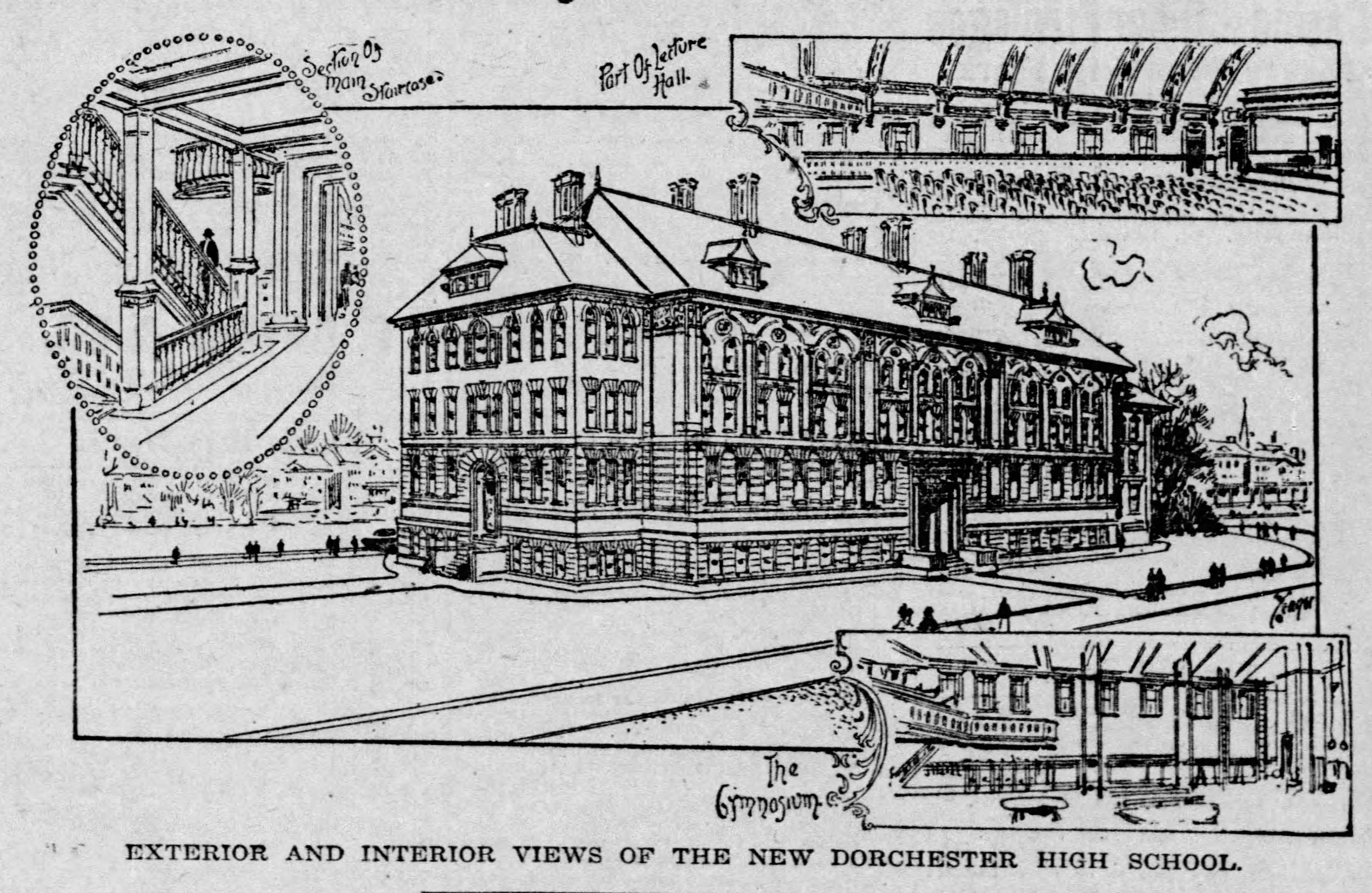
Second home of Dorchester High School, 1901–1925. Now Latin Academy Apartments

Dorchester High School is a defunct secondary school that was located in Dorchester (now part of Boston) in Massachusetts, United States, from 1852 to 2003.

== History ==
Dorchester High School was founded in 1852 in what was then the independent town of Dorchester, Massachusetts. In 1870, Dorchester was annexed by the City of Boston and Dorchester High came under the jurisdiction of Boston Public Schools. When a new school building on Peacevale Road opened in 1925, the student body was split. Dorchester High for Boys moved to the new facility, while Dorchester High School for Girls remained in the Codman Square building. In a Boston School Committee vote in 1953, the school again became co-educational when the Dorchester High School for Girls was closed. The school existed until 2003, when it was closed by the Boston School Committee to create the Dorchester Education Complex.

== Locations ==
- 1852–1901 Dorchester Avenue at Centre Street
- 1901–1925 Talbot Avenue, Codman Square
- 1925–2003 Peacevale Road

== Notable alumni ==
- Terry Anderson, former NFL wide receiver
- Ray Bolger, dancer, actor, starring as the Scarecrow in the Wizard of Oz (1920)
- Ivan Caesar, former NFL linebacker, Minnesota Vikings
- Frank Coombs, California legislator, U.S. congressman, U.S. Minister to Japan
- Norm Crosby, TV comedian
- Jack Hagerty, former college football head coach, Georgetown University
- Childe Hassam, Impressionist painter
- Aldro Hibbard, plein air painter
- Rose Fitzgerald Kennedy, mother of President John F. Kennedy and three U.S. Senators (1906)
- Warren McGuirk, longtime athletic director, University of Massachusetts Amherst (UMass)
- Otto P. Snowden, founder of Freedom House
- Freddie Summers, former NFL defensive back
