= Mary Welleck Garretson =

American paleontologist

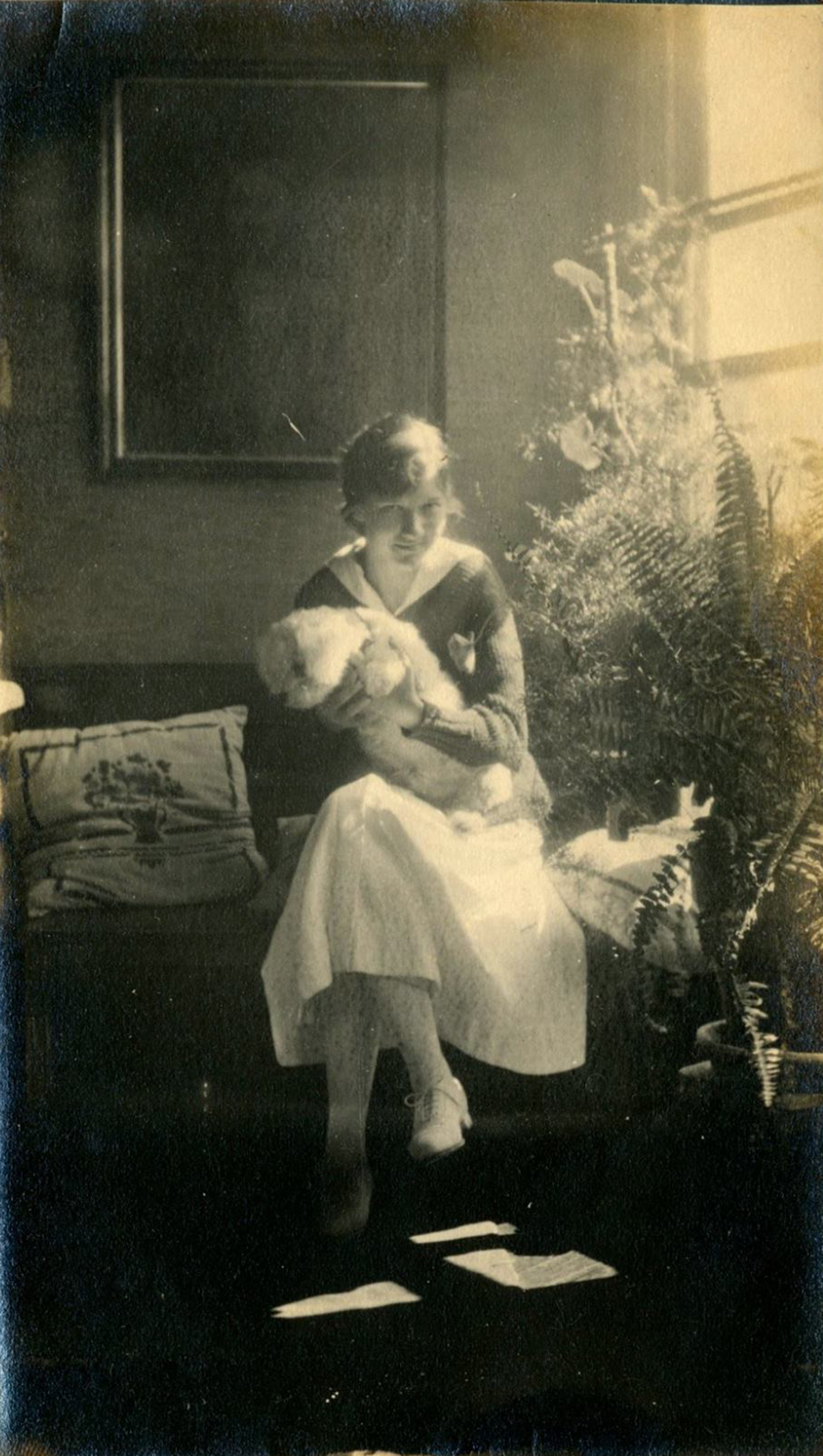
Welleck Picture

Mary Welleck Garretson (née Welleck; December 16, 1896 - May 8, 1971) was an American science consultant, specializing in geology and palaeontology, and subtly in economic and engineering biology. She was a long time research assistant to Amadeus W. Grabau at Columbia University, taught geology, and later served as president of the Haitian-American Resource Company.

== Personal life ==
Garretson was born on December 16, 1896, to father Ernest Welleck, a scientific editor and journalist, and mother Mary Noble. Garretson was born in Cincinnati, Ohio where she resided for the majority of her childhood. Her maternal grandfather was Thomas Satterwhite Noble, a famous nineteenth century American artist. Whilst studying at Columbia University, Mary met her future husband, William Melvin Garretson and got married on September 27, 1922. During World War II, she also undertook employment as personnel for airlines from 1943 to 1945 (Behre, n.d., p. 72). She had two children, Mary Louise Garretson, and William Welleck Garretson. On May 8, 1971, in White Plains, New York, Garretson died after a battle with a serious life-long illness (Behre, n.d., p. 72). According to professor Amadeus Grabau, Garretson was described as a "hard working student," and was "determined in her quest for a Ph. D degree" (Friedman, 2007, p. 87).

== Education ==
From 1909 until 1914, Garretson studied at the Boston Girls Latin School, where her academic career got its start (Behre, n.d., p. 72). Garretson made the switch to a higher education and enrolled at New York's Barnard College, where she graduated with an A.B. in 1918 (Behre, n.d., p. 72). Garretson pursued a broad curriculum in her academic endeavors, with a particular emphasis on scientific subjects (Behre, n.d.). She continued her education from 1918 to 1919 at Columbia University, where she obtained an M.A. with a focus on geology, sedimentation, and invertebrate biology (Behre, n.d.). Garretson had mentoring from eminent academics including Amadeus W. Grabau, C.P. Berkey, and F.K. Morris while attending Columbia (Behre, n.d., p. 72). In addition to developing and instructing what is regarded as one of the earliest geology correspondence courses for the Young Men's Christian Association (YMCA) from 1921 to 1923, Mary was a pioneering graduate assistant at Columbia. During the second World War, she proved herself as adaptable by working as a personnel clerk for industrial and airline companies (Behre, n.d., p. 72). In 1946, she began working as a research assistant at Columbia University, demonstrating her continued dedication to academia (Behre, n.d.). Starting from this year to 1951, Garretson served the academic community at Hunter College in New York City as a student adviser and geology lecturer (Behre, n.d., p. 72). Her many interests were highlighted by her writing on popular science and by her series of essays for the New York Tribune in 1924 on the geology of New York City (Behre, n.d.). Mary Welleck Garretson's career and educational path are evidence of her passion for geology, science and her groundbreaking contributions to teaching approaches.

== Work in geology and science ==
While attending Columbia University and working for the YMCA, Garretson became an assistant at the Brooklyn Children's Museum, where she made several contributions during the 1920s. She later worked as a geological consultant during World War Two and was hired by both airline and industrial companies from 1949 to 1951. Her work includes studying and writing about the geological characteristics of different areas. One of her articles published in the New York Times, reported on her survey results about the geological characteristics of New York City.

Garretson was an active member of several professional organizations, including The Geological Society of America, American Institute of Mining, Metallurgical and Petroleum Engineers, the International society of Economic Geologists, the American Geophysical Union, the Geological Society of China and the New York Historical Society. She served on the board of director of the Westchester County Conservation Association from 1933 to 1950, and was recognized as one of its founders.

In 1953, Garretson published 'Color in trilobites of Trenton age' in Science. Her findings associated fossil coloration with water movement and trilobite moulting. After working as a geological consultant , she returned teaching and later become the president of the Haitian-American Resource Company serving from 1956 until her death in 1971. Through her consultation efforts and her advice on mineral economics, Garretson contributed to the geological studies and developments in Haiti.

== Research contributions with Amadeus Grabau ==
Professor Amadeus W. Grabau is regarded as the father of modern sedimentology and Garretson acted as the Professor's primary research assistant in many of his projects, including the theory of horizontal displacement, otherwise known as continental drift. This refers to the horizontal movement of continents over an extended period of time. She and Professor Grabau met during her studies at Columbia University. She had worked alongside him to create his book "North American Index Fossils". They were both supporters of Pangaea, which proposes that the earth was previously a supercontinent prior to continental drift. Professor Grabau and Garretson made significant contributions to what is currently understood about sedimentation. While Professor Grabau continued his studies on continental stratigraphy and index fossils in China in the 1930s, Garretson was his primary research assistant back in the United States of America. During Professor Grabau's extended stay in China (Mazur, 2006, p. 73) notes, he wrote various research papers in which Garretson had assisted in writing and researching. She was a close correspondent and assistant to him until his death.
