= Carol Newsom (photographer) =

American photographer

Carol Lee Natelson Newsom (May 23, 1946–March 13, 2003) was an American photographer who covered international tennis from 1974 until her death in 2003. A pioneer for women's tennis promotion, Newsom was the official photographer for the early days of the professional Women's Tennis Association (WTA) tour and Virginia Slims Tennis Circuit in the 1970s and 1980s. In 1980, she became the first woman photographer to be granted a credential to shoot pictures on Centre Court at the All England Lawn Tennis Club, Wimbledon.

== Early life ==
Carol Newsom was born in Brookline, Massachusetts to Nathan Barnard Natelson (1912–1980) and Belle Fine Natelson (1918–1993). She had a younger brother, Robert J. Natelson (1951–1981). Newsom graduated from high school from Girls Latin School and then went to Boston University, where she graduated in 1968 with a degree in mathematics. She then began her first career as a high school math teacher at Milton High School.

== Career ==
Newsom first began her career as a photojournalist for tennis in 1974. She was inspired by the enthusiasm expressed by Bud Collins on a PBS program about tennis. Her goal was to depict in photos what tennis writers, journalists, and broadcasters were using words to describe the sport. As a Massachusetts native, she began her new career by photographing local tournaments, Tennis New England events, and the World TeamTennis Boston Lobsters. From 1976 to 1980 she was the official tournament photographer for Longwood Cricket Club.

While covering the Boston Lobsters, Newsom came to the attention of Billie Jean King and Rosie Casals. They were looking for a photographer to travel with and document the recently formed women's professional tennis circuit. Working as the official photographer for the Virginia Slims Circuit for ten years, Newsom traveled the country shooting the action on and off the court.

By the late 1970s her photographs began being picked up by international wire services such as United Press International (UPI), Agence France-Presse (AFP), Reuters, and Associated Press (AP), earning her recognition not only in her local area, but across the United States and around the world. In 1980, Newsom applied for a press credential to be a photographer at the Wimbledon Championships. She made history when the organizing committee agreed to grant her said credential, thus becoming the first female to be permitted to photograph on Centre Court.

Throughout her career, Newsom documented both the women's and men's professional tennis circuits and events around the world, and regularly attended the French Open, Wimbledon, US Open championships, and other significant tennis tournaments in England and the United States from 1980 until her death. Her sharp eye, skill, and timing allowed her to capture the beauty, intensity, and whimsical aspects of the sport. Newsom told fellow photographers, "I believe that if I keep my eyes open, I'll find a shot. Sometimes you just feel the magic."

Beyond fulfilling her requirements for documenting the tennis events, Newsom also served as a mentor and a voice of encouragement for several up-and-coming photographers.

In June 2003, Newsom was posthumously elected into the New England Tennis Hall of Fame for her contributions to the sport.

== Death and legacy ==
In 1991, Newsom was diagnosed with multiple sclerosis. She controlled the disease with medication that affected her vision, but not her skill for capturing the action taking place on the tennis court.

In 2000, she was diagnosed with breast cancer. Despite this diagnosis, Newsom managed to continue her grueling schedule, attending tennis events across the globe. At the 2002 US Open, she told people, "I have two jobs – pictures and fighting [the cancer]. It's a good fight." In early 2003, when told of her upcoming June induction into the New England Tennis Hall of Fame, Newsom announced that she wouldn't be able to attend in person because she had arrangements to be in Paris, France to work the French Open.

Carol Newsom succumbed to breast cancer at MetroWest Medical Center in Framingham, Massachusetts on March 13, 2003, survived by her husband David G. Newsom (1946–2020).

The Carol Newsom Collection is housed at the Museum at the International Tennis Hall of Fame in Newport, Rhode Island.

== Publications ==
Newsom's photographs have appeared in numerous publications around the world, including as a regular contributor to Tennis Week magazine.

In 2009, Dennis J. Phillips authored a book titled Women Tennis Stars: Biographies and Records of Champions, 1800s to Today, which included Newsom's photographs for approximately half of the player biographies featured.

- Tinling: Sixty Years in Tennis. Ted Tinling, Sidgwick & Jackson, London, 1983. ISBN 9780283989636.
- Martina. Martina Navratilova and George Vecsey, Alfred A. Knopf, New York, 1985. ISBN 9780394536408.
- Passing Shots: Pam Shriver on Tour. Pam Shriver, Frank Deford, and Susan Adams, McGraw-Hill Company, New York, 1987. ISBN 9780070571778.
- We Have Come A Long Way: The Story of Women's Tennis. Billie Jean King with Cynthia Starr, McGraw-Hill Company, New York, 1988. ISBN 9780070346253.
- My Life with the Pros. Bud Collins, E. F. Dutton & Co., New York, 1989. ISBN 9780525246596.
- Ladies of the Court: Grace and Disgrace on the Women's Tennis Tour. Michael Mewshaw, Crown Publishers, Inc., New York, 1993. ISBN 9780517587584.
- Getting a Grip: On my body, my mind, my self. Monica Seles, The Penguin Group, New York, 2009. ISBN 9781583333303.
- Women Tennis Stars: Biographies and records of champions, 1880s to today, Dennis J. Phillips, McFarland & Company, 2009. ISBN 9780786435289.

== Awards ==
- 1986: Kodak Photojournalism Award
- 1987: Women's International Tennis Association (WITA) Media Person of the Year Award
- 1988: Spirit of Wimbledon Photo Competition
- 2003: USTA New England Tennis Hall of Fame – awarded posthumously
