= Patriarca crime family =

Italian-American organized crime group

- Raymond Patriarca, who was the boss from 1954 to 1984.
- Founded: c. 1916; 110 years ago
- Founder: Gaspare Messina
- Named after: Raymond Patriarca
- Founding location: Boston, Massachusetts and Providence, Rhode Island, United States
- Years active: c. 1910s–present
- Territory: Primarily Greater Boston, Greater Providence and Greater New Haven, with additional territory throughout New England, as well as Las Vegas and South Florida
- Ethnicity: Italians as "made men" and other ethnicities as associates
- Membership (est.): 30 made members (2024)
- Activities: Racketeering, gambling, bookmaking, loansharking, extortion, labor racketeering, waste management, narcotics trafficking, smuggling, robbery, fencing, fraud, money laundering, prostitution, pornography, assault, and murder
- Allies: Bufalino crime family; Chicago Outfit; Colombo crime family; DeCavalcante crime family; Gambino crime family; Genovese crime family; Los Angeles crime family; Philadelphia crime family; Hells Angels MC
- Rivals: Charlestown Gang; Gustin Gang; Winter Hill Gang; and various other gangs in New England

The Patriarca crime family (/ˌpætriˈɑːrkə/, Italian pronunciation: [patriˈarka]), also known as the New England Mafia, the Boston Mafia, the Providence Mafia, the Boston–Providence Mafia, or the Office, is an Italian-American Mafia crime family operating in New England. The family consists of two distinct factions, one based in Providence, Rhode Island, and the other in Boston, Massachusetts. The Patriarca family has a lesser presence in New Haven, Connecticut, as well as in New Hampshire and Maine.

Raymond Patriarca became boss of the family in 1954 and led the organization from the Federal Hill neighborhood of Providence until his death in 1984. Under Patriarca's leadership, the family profited primarily from illegal gambling, loansharking, pornography and trafficking in stolen goods. Patriarca also held a stake in the Dunes hotel and casino in Las Vegas, from which he benefited from the "skimming" of the casino's revenue. At peak membership, the Patriarca family consisted of over 100 "made men".

Upon the death of Patriarca Sr., his son Raymond Patriarca Jr. succeeded him as boss of the family. Patriarca Jr. was an ineffective leader, and he was the target of an attempted coup led by East Boston-based caporegime Joseph "J. R." Russo during the late 1980s. Patriarca Jr., Russo and numerous others were imprisoned on RICO charges in 1992, and Boston mobster Frank Salemme subsequently emerged as boss of the family. Internal warfare in the Patriarca family continued in the 1990s as a renegade faction within the Boston underworld led by Robert Carrozza challenged Salemme loyalists for control of the family. Salemme and Carrozza were imprisoned during a string of convictions, and Luigi Manocchio took over as boss in 1996, returning the family's leadership to Providence.

It was estimated in 2012 that the Patriarca family consisted of approximately 30 "made" members. From the mid-2010s, the family was led by Carmen "The Cheese Man" Dinunzio, a member of the Boston faction, until his death on September 21, 2025.

== History ==
=== Early years ===
Before the start of Prohibition, two separate Mafia families emerged in New England: one based in Boston, Massachusetts, and the other based in Providence, Rhode Island. Gaspare DiCola acted as boss of the Boston family until his assassination on September 21, 1916. This allowed Gaspare Messina, a Sicilian mobster who had alleged close ties to Bonanno crime family in New York City, to become the new boss. Meanwhile, the Providence family formed in 1917 under Frank Morelli, who went on to control bootlegging and illegal gambling operations in both Providence and Connecticut.

In 1924, Messina stepped down as boss of the Boston family, assuming a businessman's role while working with Frank Cucchiara and Paolo Pagnotta from a grocery store on Prince Street in the North End. A power struggle ensued within the Boston mob as rival gangs fought for illegal gambling, bootlegging, loan sharking and rackets. East Boston mobster Filippo Buccola emerged as the boss of the Boston family. In December 1930 or early 1931, a Mafia meeting was held in which Messina was elected the temporary Capo dei capi of the wider American Mafia. He retired from Mafia affairs in the early 1930s and died at his home in Somerville, Massachusetts, in June 1957.

During the early 1930s, Buccola battled other ethnic gangs for territory in Boston, along with his underboss Joseph Lombardo, another mobster from the North End. In December 1931, Lombardo arranged the murder of Frank Wallace, the boss of South Boston's Irish Gustin Gang. In 1932, Morelli merged his Providence family with Buccola's Boston family, forming the New England crime family. Buccola ruled as boss of the combined family from East Boston as he continued to fatally dispatch his competition. After the murder of Jewish mob boss Charles "King" Solomon at Buccola's command, Buccola became the most powerful gangster in Boston. On April 27, 1952, Buccola held a party in Johnston, Rhode Island, to celebrate his retirement and Raymond Patriarca's ascension to boss of the family. He retired to Sicily in 1954, where he ran a chicken farm. He died in 1987 of natural causes at the age of 101.

=== Patriarca era ===
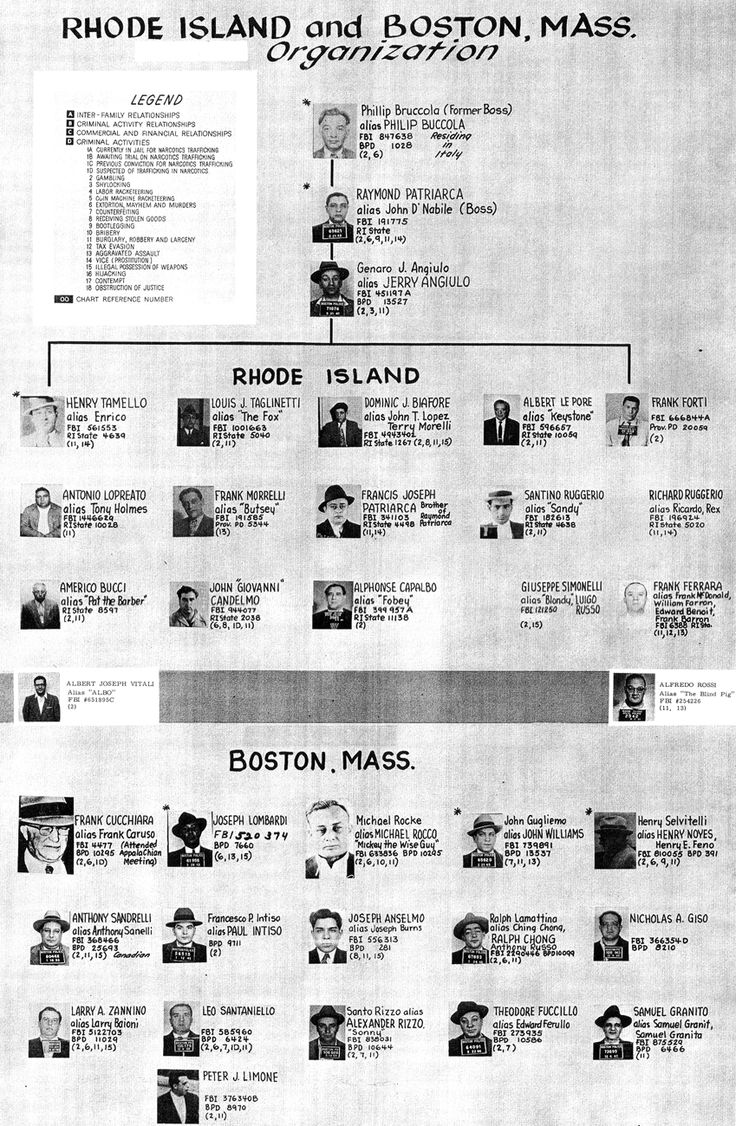
FBI chart of the Patriarca family in 1965

In 1956, Patriarca made drastic changes in the family, the biggest being the relocation of their base of operations to Providence, using the National Cigarette Service Company and Coin-O-Matic Distributors, a vending machine and pinball business on Atwells Avenue, as a front organization. The business was known to family members as "The Office."

Raymond Patriarca Sr.'s Rhode Island State Police I.D. photo

Patriarca was a strict and ruthless leader; he ran the family for decades and made it clear that other Mafia organizations were not permitted to operate in New England. He was skilled at warding off police and maintaining a low profile, thus receiving little hindrance from law enforcement. The family ventured into new rackets such as pornography and narcotics, though mob informer Vincent Teresa insisted that Patriarca forbade the family to deal in drugs.

During his reign as boss, Patriarca formed strong relationships with the New York-based Genovese and Colombo crime families, deciding that the Connecticut River would be the dividing line between their territory and his own. His long-time underboss, Enrico Tameleo, was also a member of New York's Bonanno family. The New England family controlled organized crime in Boston and Worcester, Massachusetts, where Genovese capo Carlo Mastrototaro reigned as the local boss for over half a century, while the Genovese family controlled organized crime in Hartford, Connecticut; Springfield, Massachusetts; and Albany, New York.

In addition to having close ties to the Genovese family, Patriarca also sat on the Commission and had investments in two Las Vegas casinos. Another of his underbosses, Gennaro "Jerry" Angiulo, was involved in the numbers racket in Boston and was shaken down by rival mobsters before he became a "made" member. Angiulo solved this problem by paying Patriarca $50,000 and agreeing to pay him $100,000 per year to become an inducted member of his family. Angiulo continued to control his large illegal gambling network in Boston.

=== Apalachin meeting and aftermath ===
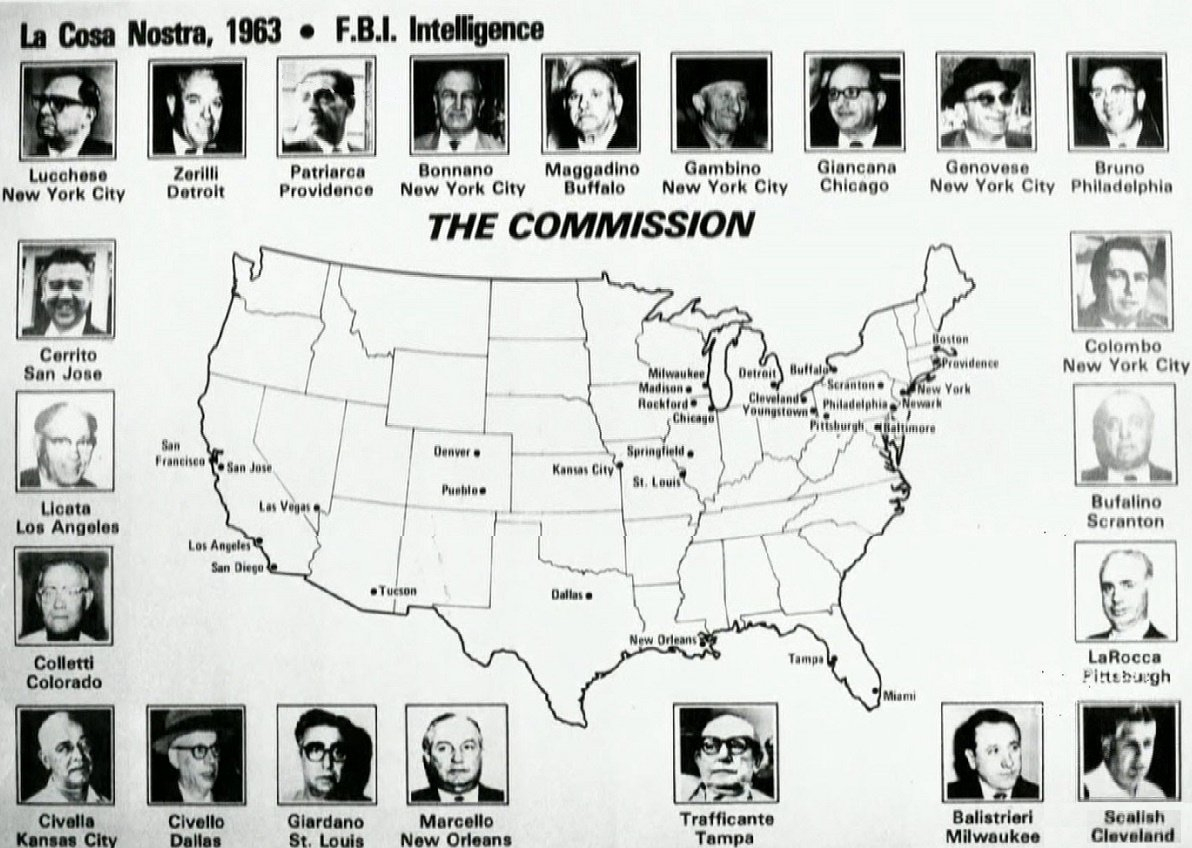
FBI's 1963 La Cosa Nostra Commission chart

In 1957, more than sixty of the country's most powerful Mafia bosses, including Joe Bonanno, Carlo Gambino and Vito Genovese, met in Apalachin, New York. Patriarca was also in attendance and was subsequently arrested when the meeting was suddenly raided by police, drawing much attention to him from the press, the public and law enforcement.

The situation became worse for Patriarca in 1961, when U.S. Attorney General Robert F. Kennedy began an assault on organized crime. Law enforcement agencies worked to develop informants within the Mafia and finally succeeded in 1966, when Joseph "The Animal" Barboza, a Patriarca family hitman, was arrested on a concealed weapons charge. Barboza claimed to have killed twenty-six people but became concerned when Patriarca did not raise his bail and two of his friends were killed for trying to do so. He soon decided to turn informant.

Based on Barboza's testimony, Patriarca and Tameleo were indicted in 1967 for the murder of Providence bookmaker Willie Marfeo. Patriarca was convicted and began serving time in 1969, and Angiulo served as acting boss. Patriarca resumed control of the family after his release from prison in 1974. For his testimony, Barboza was given a one-year prison term, including time served. He was paroled in March 1969 and told to leave Massachusetts permanently. In 1971, Barboza pleaded guilty to a second-degree murder charge in California and sentenced to five years at Folsom Prison; he was murdered in San Francisco by Joseph "J. R." Russo on February 11, 1976, less than three months after his release.

Patriarca was plagued by law enforcement for the rest of his life, and he was charged numerous times for a variety of crimes until his death. In 1978, Vincent Teresa testified that Patriarca had participated in a 1960 attempt by the Central Intelligence Agency (CIA) to kill Fidel Castro that was never carried out. In 1983, Patriarca was charged with the murder of Raymond Curcio, and was arrested in 1984 for the murder of Robert Candos, whom Patriarca believed was an informant. Patriarca died of a heart attack on July 11, 1984, aged 76.

=== Patriarca Junior and decline ===
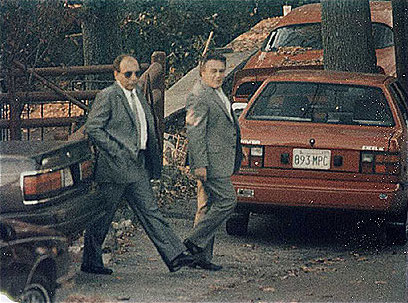
An FBI surveillance photograph of Angelo "Sonny" Mercurio (right), with Raymond Patriarca, Jr. (left)

After Patriarca's death, the New England family began a long period of decline, resulting from both legal prosecution and internal violence. Angiulo attempted to take over as boss from behind bars, while Larry Zannino, the family's top lieutenant, backed Patriarca's son Raymond Patriarca, Jr. for the position. The Commission approved Patriarca, Jr.'s ascendancy to leadership, and his position was confirmed. Zannino was made consigliere, but he was sentenced to thirty years in prison in 1987. Angiulo was sentenced to forty-five years in prison on racketeering charges. Other senior members died or were imprisoned, such as Henry Tameleo and Francesco Intiso.

William "The Wild Guy" Grasso, an East Hartford-based gangster, became underboss because of the younger Patriarca's weak leadership. Some investigators believed that Grasso was actually in charge, but these rumors ended when Grasso was found dead in June 1989, slain by a gangster from Springfield as factions of the family began fighting each other for dominance. Grasso's murder weakened Patriarca, Jr.'s position. Nicholas Bianco was eventually indicted for the murder, but he became acting underboss before taking over the family's Providence operations.

On March 26, 1990, Patriarca, Jr. and twenty other family members and associates were indicted on charges of racketeering, extortion, narcotics, gambling and murder. The indictments included underboss Bianco, consigliere Joseph Russo, and lieutenants Biagio DiGiacomo, Vincent Ferrara, Matthew Guglielmetti, Joseph A. Tiberi Sr, Dennis Lepore, Gaetano J. Milano, Jack Johns, John "Sonny" Castagna, Louis Fallia, Frank and Louis Pugliono, Frank Colontoni and Robert Carrozza. The arrests were described as "the most sweeping attack ever launched on a single organized crime family." One of the most damaging pieces of evidence was a tape recording of a Mafia induction ceremony, at which thirteen mafiosi were present. Because of this embarrassment, Patriarca was replaced as boss by Bianco, who maintained a very low profile. However, Bianco was sentenced to 11 years in prison in 1991, while eight other family members were convicted on Racketeer Influenced and Corrupt Organizations Act (RICO) charges. Bianco died in prison in November 1994.

On January 6, 1992, all of the defendants in the RICO trial pleaded guilty and received lengthy sentences and large fines. Patriarca, Jr. was sentenced to eight years in prison in June 1992 after pleading guilty to racketeering charges. In 1993, 26 others were indicted and convicted for running a bookmaking operation.

=== Internal warfare ===
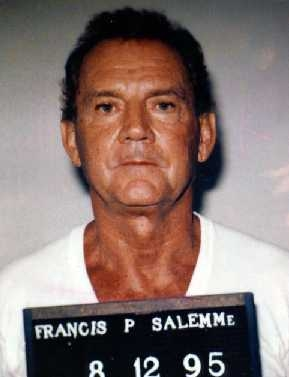
FBI mugshot of Frank Salemme

FBI surveillance photo of Genovese New England capo Carlo Mastrotaro (L) along with Patriarca boss Frank Salemme (C) and Patriarca capo Robert DeLuca (R) in 1990s.

Frank Salemme took control of the family after the RICO trial of Patriarca Jr. which moved the family's base of power to Boston. Salemme's ascension to boss sparked tension among the family's factions. On March 31, 1994, Patriarca soldiers Ronald Coppola and Pete Scarpellini were shot and killed at a social club in Cranston, Rhode Island, by another Patriarca soldier, Nino Cucinotta, during a card game. On October 20, 1994, Joe Souza was shot inside an East Boston phone booth, dying from his injuries on October 31. On December 11, 1994, 25-year old drug dealer and Salemme loyalist Paul Strazzulla was shot and killed, his body recovered inside of his fire-torched car in Revere, Massachusetts.

In January 1995, Salemme was indicted along with Stephen Flemmi and James "Whitey" Bulger on extortion and racketeering charges, and Salemme discovered through court documents that his close allies Flemmi and Bulger were long-time FBI informants. Bulger's friend, FBI agent John Connolly, let him run his criminal operations with impunity for informing on the Patriarca family.

After Salemme was imprisoned, a renegade faction led by Robert F. Carrozza, Anthony Ciampi, Stephen Foye, and Michael P. Romano, Sr. waged war on the Salemme faction. On April 3, 1996, 63-year-old Richard "Vinnie the Pig" DeVincent was shot and killed in Medford, Massachusetts, after refusing to pay street tax from Salemme loyalists. In April 1997, the FBI indicted 15 members of the renegade faction, including Carrozza, Ciampi, Romano, and others. The grand jury testimony that resulted in the indictments was dominated by Sean Thomas Cote, who was the first of four indicted members to turn state's evidence. The jury ultimately acquitted the defendants of most charges but was deadlocked on murder and racketeering charges. Following Salemme's indictment, Providence family member Luigi "Baby Shacks" Manocchio took control of the family.

Several of the defendants changed their pleas to guilty during a second trial, including Ciampi and Eugene Rida. Salemme pleaded guilty to racketeering charges on December 9, 1999, and was sentenced to 11 years in prison. In early 2001, Salemme agreed to testify against Flemmi and Bulger. In December 2022, Salemme died in prison.

=== Limone and the Boston faction regain control ===
In the late 2000s, the power of the family shifted back to the Boston faction when longtime family boss Luigi "Baby Shacks" Manocchio, stepped down in 2009, allowing Boston mobster Peter "Chief Crazy Horse" Limone to become the family's new boss. Limone was arrested back in December 2008 and charged with racketeering and given a suspended sentence on July 1, 2010.

On January 19, 2011, Manocchio was arrested in Fort Lauderdale, Florida, and was charged with extortion and conspiracy. Manocchio had stepped down as boss in 2009 after the FBI began investigating two strip clubs in late 2008. In February 2012, Manocchio agreed to plead guilty and was sentenced to 5½ years in prison for extortion on May 11, 2012.

It was revealed after many members of the crime family were charged in several RICO indictments that two Caporegimes Mark Rossetti and Robert DeLuca had become government informants.

On December 17, 2011, family associate Anthony "Ponytail Tony" Parrillo was arrested after a physical altercation at his establishment in Providence, Club 295, and was later charged with two counts of felony assault. Parrillo had his bouncers attack patron Jack Fernandes after misidentifying him for another man who had engaged in sexual acts in the club's bathroom then stabbed a security guard when he confronted him about it. Fernandes was using the same bathroom stall as the aggressor. The assault began in the bathroom and continued in the back alley of the club where Fernandes's wife, Sumiya Majeed, was injured as well. Fernandes suffered a broken nose, broken ribs and a shattered eye socket. Parrillo was sentenced to serve five years of a 15-year sentence on April 11, 2016, but appealed his conviction to the Rhode Island Supreme Court. He was released on bail pending the appeal, but his motion was denied and he began his sentence on August 5, 2020.

In late 2009, Anthony DiNunzio became the acting boss after Limone's arrest. DiNunzio operated from Boston's North End and was the younger brother to Carmen DiNunzio. In 2010, DiNunzio extorted Rhode Island strip clubs with members of the Gambino crime family. On April 25, 2012, DiNunzio was arrested and charged with racketeering and extortion. On September 13, 2012, DiNunzio pleaded guilty to shaking down Rhode Island strip clubs and was sentenced to six years on November 14, 2012.

In 2012, the Patriarca family was estimated to have about 30 made members active in the New England area, centered in the cities of Boston and Providence.

On October 2, 2014, acting boss Antonio L. "Spucky" Spagnolo, 72, and reputed made man Pryce "Stretch" Quintina, 74, were arrested for allegedly extorting thousands of dollars in protection payments from a video poker machine company, which installed machines for illegal gambling in bars and social clubs. Spagnolo took over as acting boss after DiNunzio was arrested back in 2012. Both Spagnolo and Quintina are reputedly old members of the Patriarca crime family's Boston faction.

DiNunzio was released from prison on February 17, 2015, after serving five and a half years on bribery charges. Upon his release, he was thought to renew his position within the family and reconvene with his old North End crew. DiNunzio reportedly inducted his nephew, Louis "Baby Cheese" DiNunzio and two other members of his crew, Johnny Scarpelli and Salvatore "Tea Party Tore" Marino into the family during a ceremony held in the basement of a North End restaurant and attended by Limone, acting boss Anthony "Spucky" Spagnolo and Providence capo Matthew "Good-Looking Matty" Guglielmetti. At that same event, DiNunzio promoted his bodyguard Gregory "Fat Boy" Costa to capo of the North End crew.

Limone died of cancer on June 19, 2017. He was succeeded by his acting boss Carmen DiNunzio, another powerful Boston mobster.

=== DiNunzio brothers and Boston North End crew ===
When Carmen DiNunzio became the new boss his administration consisted of underboss Guglielmetti and consigliere Joseph "Joe the Bishop" Achille, both members of the Providence faction. On August 7, 2018, Achille died. In 2020, Guglielmetti relinquished the position of underboss to Edward "Eddie" Lato because of health concerns and regained the rank of capo.

On July 18, 2022, former boxer and actor Dino Guilmette was arrested on drug trafficking charges in Cranston, Rhode Island. He had been the target of a two-year investigation by the Rhode Island State Police into the sale of cocaine and lorazepam, which he reportedly engaged in, in September and November 2021. According to a State Police affidavit, Guilmette has ties to the New England Mafia and dealt in narcotics trafficking under the authorization of Guglielmetti. Several evidence files in the case were taken from surveillance records of the Toscan Social Club, an organized crime meeting place for which Guilmette was vice president.

On October 27, 2022, Rhode Island State House senior deputy chief of staff John Conti resigned from his post amid allegations that he was a silent partner in a marijuana growing business with Patriarca family associate Raymond "Scarface" Jenkins. A State Police probe revealed the two shared an interest in the Organic Bees marijuana grow operation, which started in 2017 and shut down in 2022 because Conti and Jenkins would not disclose their involvement in the business. Conti and Jenkins were also surveilled in December 2020 camera recordings meeting just outside the State House and conversing for approximately 20 minutes. The former chief of staff was also mentioned meeting with several other high-ranking Patriarca mobsters, including a 2020 Christmas party at a Providence restaurant attended by Conti, Guglielmetti, and Lato. Conti's attorney Jimmy Burchfield Jr. stated to WPRI "Mr. Conti had no role in the business organization, Organic Bees […] Mr. Conti has been employed by the House of Representatives honorably, serving under four speakers since first hired in December 2006."

In 2024, the Boston office of the FBI, which oversees much of New England, disbanded its organized crime squad, reassigning agents to other priorities such as terrorism, espionage, and cyber-crime. According to former federal prosecutor Fred Wyshak, there is not "much of anything left" of the Patriarca family because "the leadership was destroyed and nobody really has the strength to step in and fill that void". Steven O'Donnell, a former superintendent of the Rhode Island State Police, stated that although the family consists of around 30 "made" members it is "just not at the threat level that they were years ago" and that "there are other entities that are a greater threat in this country". Former Massachusetts State Police detective lieutenant Steve Johnson described the family as "a shell of itself" with a membership consisting of "mostly figurehead people and wannabes". On August 23, 2024, family underboss Edward Lato died of natural causes, aged 77, after surviving a heart attack and undergoing treatment for cancer. On December 8, 2024, former boss Luigi Manocchio died in Bristol, Rhode Island, at the age of 97. On September 21, 2025, family boss Carmen "The Cheese Man" Dinunzio died at the age 68 of natural causes. On September 29, 2026, family consigliere Anthony "Spucky" Spagnolo died at the age 84 of natural causes.

== Historical leadership ==
=== Boss (official and acting) ===
^{Excluding: Frank Morelli the leader of the Providence family from 1917–1932, when he stepped down becoming underboss to Buccola.}

- c. 1910–1916: Gaspare DiCola—murdered on September 21, 1916. ^{Boston}
- 1916–1924: Gaspare Messina—stepped down, died in 1957 ^{Boston}
- 1924–1954: Filippo "Phil" Buccola—united both families in 1932, retired, died in 1987 ^{Boston}
- 1954–1984: Raymond L. S. Patriarca, Sr.—imprisoned in 1970, died on July 11, 1984 ^{Providence}
  - 1968–1973: Gennaro "Jerry" Angiulo—stepped down ^{Boston}
- 1984–1991: Raymond "Junior" Patriarca, Jr.—stepped down in 1991 ^{Providence}
  - Acting 1990–1991: Nicholas "Nicky" Bianco—became official boss ^{Providence}
- 1991: Nicholas "Nicky" Bianco—imprisoned on December 28, 1991, and died on December 14, 1994 ^{Providence}
- 1991–1996: Frank "Cadillac Frank" Salemme—jailed in 1995, turned government witness died December 2022 ^{Boston}
  - Acting 1995–1996: John "Action Jack" Salemme—brother to Frank Salemme; jailed ^{Boston}
- 1996–2009: Luigi "Baby Shacks" Manocchio—stepped down, imprisoned; died on December 8, 2024 ^{Providence}
- 2009–2016: Peter "Chief Crazy Horse" Limone—arrested December 2008; died on June 19, 2017 ^{Boston}
  - Acting 2009–2012: Anthony L. DiNunzio—arrested on April 25, 2012 ^{Boston}
  - Acting 2012–2015: Anthony "Spucky" Spagnolo—arrested on October 2, 2014 ^{Boston}
  - Acting 2015–2016: Carmen "The Big Cheese" DiNunzio—became official boss ^{Boston}
- 2016–2025: Carmen "The Big Cheese" DiNunzio – died on September 21, 2025 ^{Boston}
  - Acting 2024–2025: Robert "Bobby Russo" Carrozza — became official boss ^{Boston}
- 2025–present: Robert "Bobby Russo" Carrozza ^{Boston}

=== Underboss (official and acting) ===
- c. 1920–1932: Joseph "J.L." Lombardo—became consigliere ^{Boston}
- 1932–1947: Frank "Butsey" Morelli—retired ^{Providence}
- 1947–1954: Raymond L. S. Patriarca, Sr.—promoted to boss ^{Providence}
- 1954–1968: Enrico "Henry the Referee" Tameleo—imprisoned for life in 1968, died 1985 ^{Boston}
- 1968–1983: Gennaro "Jerry" Angiulo—imprisoned in 1983, died 2009 ^{Boston}
- 1984–1985: Francesco "Paul" Intiso—died
- 1985–1989: William "The Wild Guy" Grasso—murdered ^{New Haven}
- 1989–1991: Nicholas "Nicky" Bianco—promoted to boss ^{Providence}
- 1991: Frank "Cadillac Frank" Salemme—promoted to boss ^{Boston}
- 1991–1996: Robert DeLuca—indicted in 1994, imprisoned ^{Providence}
  - Acting 1994–1996: Luigi "Baby Shacks" Manocchio—promoted to boss ^{Providence}
- 1996–2004: Alexander Santoro "Sonny Boy" Rizzo—imprisoned in 1995–1998, died on January 20, 2005 ^{Boston}
- 2004–2016: Carmen S. "The Cheese Man" DiNunzio ^{Boston}—promoted to acting boss
  - Acting 2008–2009: Peter "Chief Crazy Horse" Limone—promoted to boss ^{Boston}
  - Acting 2009–2011: Robert "Bobby the Cigar" DeLuca—turned government witness ^{Providence}
- 2016–2020: Matthew "Good Looking Matty" Guglielmetti—stepped down ^{Providence}
- 2020–2024: Edward "Eddie" Lato ^{Providence}—died on August 23, 2024
- 2024–2025: Matthew "Good Looking Matty" Guglielmetti ^{Providence} stepped down
  - Acting 2024–2026: Biagio "Benny the Greaser" DiGiacomo—became consigliere ^{Boston}
- 2026–present: Joseph "Joe" Ruggiero Sr. ^{Providence}

=== Consigliere ===
- 1932–1954: Joseph "J. L." Lombardo—retired, died on July 17, 1969 ^{Boston}
- 1954–1976: Frank "The Cheeseman" Cucchiara—committed suicide on January 23, 1976 ^{Boston}
- 1976–1984: Vittore Nicolo "Nicky" Angiulo—demoted, died 1987 ^{Boston}
- 1984–1987: Ilario "Larry Baione" Zannino—imprisoned in 1985, died 1996 ^{Boston}
- 1987–1990: Joseph "J. R." Russo—imprisoned in 1990, died 1998 ^{Boston}
- 1990–1998: Charles "Cue Ball" Quintina—imprisoned in 1995, died on August 12, 2001 ^{Boston}
- 1998–2002: Rocco "Shaky" Argenti—died ^{Providence}
- 2003–2009: Peter "Chief Crazy Horse" Limone—promoted to Boss ^{Boston}
- 2015–2018: Joseph "Joe the Bishop" Achille—died ^{Providence}
- 2018–2024: Unknown
- 2024–2026: Antonio "Spucky" Spagnolo—died on September 29, 2026 ^{Boston}
- 2026–present: Biagio "Benny the Greaser" DiGiacomo ^{Boston}

== Current members ==
=== Administration ===
- Boss — Robert Francis "Bobby Russo" Carrozza — current boss of the family. Carrozza is the stepbrother of former consigliere and East Boston mobster Joseph "J.R." Russo. He was part of the "renegade faction" of mobsters led by capos Russo and Vinnie Ferrara who challenged William Grasso and Frank Salemme for control of the family. In 1990, Carrozza was among twenty mobsters indicted on RICO charges. He was sentenced to 19 years in prison in 1992 after pleading guilty to federal racketeering charges. Carrozza served as acting boss to Carmen "the Big Cheese" DiNunzio. He was elevated to official boss when DiNunzio died in September 2025.
- Underboss — Joseph "Joe" Ruggiero Sr. — current underboss of the family. He was longtime capo operating from Fall River, Massachusetts. A Barrington resident, Ruggiero was a close associate of former bosses Frank Salemme and Luigi Manocchio, for whom he acted as a driver and bodyguard. In 1997, Manocchio ordered him to reclaim the family's illegal operations in Fall River after the incarceration of high-ranking associate Gerard "The Frenchman" Ouimette, who previously oversaw rackets in the area. A prominent businessman, Ruggiero has owned many establishments and properties, including a bar and grille in Fall River, a restaurant called The Regatta, car dealerships in Barrington and East Providence, the old Fall River police station and the Edmund Place Health Center. In 2012, he bought the Fall River Ford automobile dealership and was shortly thereafter elected to the city's Board of Economic Development. Ruggiero's connections to former Fall River mayor William A. Flanagan were scrutinized, and Flanagan even publicly referred to him as "a key to the city's economic future". Around 2015, Ruggiero was promoted to capo of retired Providence mobster William "Blackjack" DelSanto's crew. Ruggiero became the family's new underboss after Matthew Guglielmetti stepped down.
- Consigliere — Biagio "Benny the Greaser" DiGiacomo — current consigliere. DiGiacomo is a Sicilian-born mobster and former capo of the East Boston crew, where he was based out of Roma restaurant in East Boston. DiGiacomo unknowingly allowed an undercover FBI agent, Vince DelaMontaigne, to infiltrate his crew during 1983 to 1987. As a result, the FBI surveillance team was able to record a Mafia induction ceremony in Medford on October 29, 1989. In February 1987, DiGiacomo along with soldier Anthony Spagnolo were arrested and charged with illegal gambling and conspiracy to commit murder. In the 2020s, he served as acting underboss to boss Robert Carrozza, helping consigliere Antonio Spagnolo work with East Boston capo Freddy Simone. Following the death of Spagnolo in September 2026, DiGiacomo was appointed consigliere.

=== Caporegimes ===
==== Boston faction ====
- Anthony "Bennington Street Tony" Ciampi — capo of the "East Boston (Carozza–Russo) crew". Ciampi is a protégé of Robert Carrozza. He was a member of the "East Boston crew" along with Carrozza under Joseph "J. R." Russo when the East Boston mobsters challenged Francis "Cadillac Frank" Salemme during his ascension to boss of the family. After Salemme's top enforcer, Richard "Richie the Hatchet" Devlin, began attempting to extort tribute from Ciampi and Michael "Big Mike" Romano in October 1993, Ciampi and Romano sought and received the permission of imprisoned soldier Carrozza to lead a rebellion against the Salemme leadership. On March 31, 1994, Ciampi opened fire on Devlin and another Salemme enforcer, Richard "Richie Nine Lives" Gillis, outside the Breed's Hill Social Club. Devlin was killed despite wearing a bullet-proof vest, while Gillis survived being shot three times. Ciampi was indicted alongside 14 others on federal murder and attempted murder charges in April 1997. On November 1, 1999, Ciampi pleaded guilty to killing Devlin and wounding Gillis, and participating in several other attempted murders. He was sentenced to 18 years in prison. Ciampi was released from prison in 2013.
- Gregory "Fat Boy" Costa; also known as "Fat Greg" — promoted to capo of the "North End (DiNunzio) crew" by Carmen DiNunzio during an induction ceremony in 2015, in which Johnny Scarpelli, Salvatore Marino, and Louie DiNunzio were inducted. Costa was DiNunzio's bodyguard and driver and was described as his "top collector". He served a prison sentence and was released on May 10, 1996. Costa was arrested in 2002 and 2006 with Carmen DiNunzio on racketeering charges but was acquitted.
- Anthony "The Little Cheese" DiNunzio — powerful Boston mobster, former acting boss, and brother to boss Carmen "The Cheeseman" DiNunzio. DiNunzio along with his brother Carmen control Boston's North End crew. In 2012, acting boss Anthony DiNunzio was indicted along with Providence capo Edward Lato and Providence soldier Alfred Scivola for extorting a number of Rhode Island strip clubs. In September 2017, Anthony DiNunzio was released from prison.

==== Providence faction ====
- Matthew L. "Good-Looking Matty" Guglielmetti Jr. — capo operating from Cranston. The son of family soldier Matthew Guglielmetti Sr., he was favored by Raymond L. S. Patriarca from his early criminal career in the 1970s. He was inducted in a Boston ceremony in 1977 along with seven other mobsters, and was arrested with his father in 1984 for liquor hijacking, though the charges were dropped. Guglielmetti was promoted to capo by Raymond Patriarca Jr. in the late 1980s and put in charge of the family's Connecticut faction after the murder of William Grasso in 1989. That same year, he attended a "making" ceremony in Medford, Massachusetts presided by Patriarca Jr. and Joseph Russo. Guglielmetti sentenced to 11 years in prison in 2005 for "protecting" a shipment of cocaine passing through Rhode Island. He was also arrested that year for infiltrating labor unions in Greater Providence. On June 10, 2014, Guglielmetti was released from prison. Since his release, Guglielmetti has been working with Philadelphia family capo George Borgesi. Guglielmetti served as underboss of the family between 2016 and 2020. He was made underboss again in 2025. In 2026, Guglielmetti stepped down, allowing Joseph "Joe" Ruggiero to become the new family underboss.

==== Maine–New Hampshire faction ====
- Carmen Tortora (born March 1947) — capo of the family's Maine–New Hampshire faction. Tortora was born in Boston. In 1967, he was sentenced to at least 3 years in prison for armed robbery and assault with a weapon. In 1972, Tortora was sentenced to 15 years in prison for bank robbery, and he was paroled in 1981. While on parole, Tortora was convicted of extortion and sentenced to 8 years in prison; he was released in March 1986. Tortora, a close associate of East Boston mobster Joseph Russo, was inducted into the Patriarca family in October 1989. On March 22, 1990, Tortora was indicted with seven others on various crimes including RICO. In April 1992, Tortora was sentenced by former U.S. District Judge Mark L. Wolf to 13 years in prison with a fine of $2000 for extortion. He resides in Whitefield, New Hampshire. In the mid-2020s, Tortora was reportedly promoted to capo and tasked with overseeing the family rackets in New Hampshire and Maine. Tortora has worked with Pryce "Stretch" Quintina and boss Bobby Carrozza to expand operations in New Hampshire and Maine.

=== Soldiers ===
==== Boston faction ====
- Pasquale "Patsy" Barone (born February 1961) — soldier. Barone was a protégé of North End capo Vinnie "The Animal" Ferrara. In May 1994, Barone was sentenced to life imprisonment for the October 1985 murder of Vincent "Jimmy" Limoli. He was released from prison in October 2003. In October 2003, Barone admitted to new charges of racketeering, and also to being an accomplice in the July 1979 murder of Anthony "Dapper" Corlito, and that he had shot a security guard during an armed robbery in 1982. Although Barone could possibly have been sentenced to 20 years in prison, he was sentenced to time served.
- Darin Bufalino (born March 1961) — soldier. Bufalino was charged with the February 1984 murder of Vincent DeNino, and captured in June 1987 whilst hiding in Fuengirola, Spain after becoming a fugitive. DeNino was shot four times in the head and was found in the trunk of a car in a parking lot in Revere, Massachusetts, allegedly over a $10,000 debt. Bufalino was the chauffeur and bodyguard of former boss Frank Salemme during the early 1990s, and was later associated with Mark Rossetti, who served as a captain in the Patriarca family. In 1999, Bufalino was sentenced to 10 years in prison for participating in an armed robbery which took place in 1993 at the Boston Five Cents bank at the Northgate Shopping Center in Revere; he was released in 2005. In January 2009, Bufalino was charged for the $11,000 extortion of a landscaper from Beverly, Massachusetts. In April 2012, Bufalino was sentenced by Suffolk Superior Court Judge Linda Giles to seven years in prison for conspiracy to commit extortion and attempted extortion. Bufalino was released from prison in December 2018.
- Louie "Baby Cheese" DiNunzio — soldier. Louie DiNunzio is the son of Anthony DiNunzio. He was inducted into the family by his uncle Carmen DiNunzio.
- Vincent "Vinnie Fed" Federico — soldier and close associate of former consigliere and East Boston mobster Joe "J. R." Russo.
- Vincent "Vinnie The Animal" Ferrara (born April 1949) — soldier. According to the FBI, Ferrara was "made" into the family in 1983 and was sponsored by North End capo Donato "Smiling Danny" Angiulo. After the Angiulo brothers were indicted, Ferrara became the boss of the "North End crew". In 1990, Ferrara was indicted on racketeering and pleaded guilty to ordering the October 28, 1985 murder of mob associate Jimmy Limoli and other racketeering charges. In April 1992, Ferrara was sentenced to 22 years in prison for racketeering, extortion, gambling and for ordering the murder of Vincent "Jimmy" Limoli in October 1985; he was released in May 2005. In 2005, Ferrara's lawyer had the charge of Limoli's murdered removed and had six years removed from his prison sentence. In 2006, Ferrara was released prison and claimed he retired from Mafia affairs. Ferrara allegedly served as capo operating from Norfolk County. In 2008, Ferrara was on trial in Norfolk County for bookmaking, but the charges were later dropped.
- Richard Ernest Gambale — soldier. Gambale is a Boston mobster who worked for Gennaro Angiulo. On September 14, 1984, Gambale was indicted along with Jason Angiulo, James Limone and others and charged with RICO violations.
- Vincent "Dee Dee" Gioacchini — soldier. Gioacchini was a close ally to Frederick Simone
- Dennis "Champagne Denny" Lepore — soldier. Lepore was an ally of former boss Frank Salemmes's "North End crew". Lepore, a North End mobster, was Salemme's buffer to communicate with the "East Boston crew".
- Salvatore "Tea Party Tore" Marino (born March 1977) — soldier operating from the North End. Marino and John Scarpelli were both Carmen DiNunzio's protégés and were arrested with him on racketeering charges in 2006. According to the indictment, Marino, Scarpelli and Gregory Costa were involved in a shooting scheme in 2001 to defraud bookmaker Jamie Candelino by collecting the revenues of bets if they won and not paying for their losses. Marino, Scarpelli and Louis DiNunzio were reportedly inducted by Carmen DiNunzio at a making ceremony in July 2015 in the basement of a North End bar, which was also attended by boss Peter Limone, acting boss Antonio Spagnolo and capo Matthew Guglielmetti.
- James Martorano — Boston mobster, his brother Johnny Martorano was a member of the Winter Hill Gang.
- Michael Prochilo (born November 1949) — soldier. In July 1974, Prochilo was arrested for bank robbery, targeted at the Bank of New Jersey, netting approximately $100,000. East Boston mobster who worked for former capo-turned-government informant Mark Rossetti.
- Pryce "Stretch" Quintina (born January 1940) — soldier. Quintina is close to and ally of Anthony Spagnolo. In April 1995, Quintina was sentenced to 8 years in prison with 3 years parole on an indictment from charges of extortion and illegal gambling, and he was also charged for participating in the 1981 murder of Anthony Patrizzi. In March 2016, Quintina was sentenced to over 1 year in prison for extortion, after he pled guilty, along with Boston faction soldier Antonio Spagnolo, in December 2015 for conspiring to interfere with interstate commerce by extortion. In 2025, he was identified as a soldier in Boston. Since the late 2020s, he has been involved with expanding operations in New Hampshire and Maine along with capo Carmen Tortora.
- Frederick "Freddie the Neighbor" Simone (born April 1950) — soldier. Simone is a member of the Boston faction. He served as capo of the "Day Square crew" operating in East Boston and Revere. In 1987, Simone was sentenced to serve a 15-to-20-year prison sentence, after being convicted of murder conspiracy from the 1981 murder of Angelo Patrizzi; he was released in 1998. According to law enforcement, Simone was involved in participation of loansharking and illegal gambling operations from between 1991 and January 2002. In January 2005, Simone was sentenced to a 5-to-6-year state sentence. Simone is longtime member of East Boston crew serving under Biagio DiGiacomo and Anthony Spagnolo. In the early 2000s Simone along with Vincent Gioacchini started a serious feud with their capo Anthony "Spucky" Spagnolo over gambling territory in East Boston. The feud almost led to an internal war until Manocchio and Rhode Island based captain Matthew Guglielmetti were able to settle it. In 2009, after Simone was released from prison Federal authorities label him as the new captain of the crew "East Boston (Spagnolo/Day Square) crew". Simone is a close ally to boss Carmen DiNunzio.
- John "Johnny" Scarpelli (born June 1973) — soldier operating from the North End. A protégé of Carmen DiNunzio along with Salvatore Marino, they were both arrested on racketeering charges with DiNunzio in 2006. According to the indictment, Scarpelli devised a shooting scheme with Marino and Gregory Costa in 2001 to defraud bookmaker Jamie Candelino by collecting the revenues of bets if they won and not paying for their losses. Scarpelli, Marino and Louis DiNunzio, the nephew of Carmen DiNunzio, were reportedly inducted by the older DiNunzio at a making ceremony in July 2015 in the basement of a North End bar, which was also attended by boss Peter Limone, acting boss Antonio Spagnolo and capo Matthew Guglielmetti.

==== Providence faction ====
- Vito "The Ox" DeLuca (born April 1944) — soldier. DeLuca is a Providence mobster who worked closely with Anthony "The Saint" St. Laurent. In 2000, DeLuca was deported to Italy after his conviction in a bookmaking case alongside St. Laurent. According to the U.S. attorney's office, he served as a captain during the early 2000s, and operated an illegal gambling operation in 1999 worth at least $600,000.
- Albino Folcarelli (born February 1958) — soldier. In July 2012, Folcarelli was sentenced by former U.S. District Judge William E. Smith to seven years in prison with three years of supervised release and a forfeiture of $25,000, for participation in an extortion conspiracy to extort $25,000 from a Rhode Island man.

==== Maine–New Hampshire faction ====
- William "Billy The Angel" Angelesco — soldier currently living in Temple, Maine, with operations in New Hampshire and Maine. Angelesco was an enforcer with the North End "DiNunzio crew" in the "North End crew". According to informant reports and former associates, Angelesco became sponsored by DiNunzio as a made member for the 1999 murder of gang rival, Kevin "Mucka" McCormack, although he was never arrested for the crime. (The informant reports were based on "hearsay"). He would later be charged and acquitted for a 2001 murder at a Revere strip club and convicted for extortion in 2005. In 2020, he was sentenced to 37 months in prison and 3 years of supervised release for a 2018 robbery he committed in Abington, Massachusetts.

=== Inactive members ===
- Raymond "Junior" Patriarca (born February 1945) — former boss. Raymond Patriarca is the son of former boss and namesake of the crime family, Raymond L. S. Patriarca. He served as boss of the family after his father died in 1984. In March 1990, Patriarca was arrested on charges of racketeering, murder, illegal gambling, conspiracy and extortion, and in June 1992, was sentenced to eight years in prison; he was released in around 2000. During the early 1990s, Patriarca stepped down as boss and retired from mob life. He became involved in real estate in Rhode Island.

=== Associates ===
==== Boston faction ====
- Enrico Ponzo — associate. Ponzo is an associate from Boston's North End who became affiliated with the family from the age of 20. He was identified as a Patriarca "shooter" after Revere police found a fully automatic machine gun and silencer during a search of his apartment. In June 1989, Ponzo was involved in a failed assassination attempt on Frank Salemme, firing at Salemme with an Uzi in a drive-by shooting outside a Saugus pancake house. He fled Boston in 1994, becoming a fugitive. Ponzo initially lived in Arizona, where he operated a marijuana trafficking organization, before settling in Marsing, Idaho, where he became a cattle rancher under the alias "Jay Shaw". In 1997, he was indicted alongside 14 others on racketeering charges. After Ponzo's ex-girlfriend informed authorities of his whereabouts, he was arrested in 2011. On November 20, 2013, Ponzo was convicted of racketeering. He was sentenced on April 28, 2014, to 28 years in prison.
- Paul M. "Paulie the Plumber" Weadick — associate. Weadick was affiliated with both the Patriarca family and the Winter Hill Gang. He was a close associate of Frank Salemme Jr., with whom he had a history of "ripping off" drug dealers. On June 13, 1982, Weadick and James Haney lured Patriarca/Winter Hill Gang associate Joseph Mistretta to Weadick's home in Burlington and shot him dead. While Weadick and Haney cleaned up the crime scene inside the residence and as Mistretta's body lay in the trunk of his own car outside, the pair were arrested after police were called by a neighbor. Weadick was convicted of first-degree manslaughter and sentenced to ten years in prison. He was paroled in 1986 but returned to prison after he and Salemme Jr. were arrested for participating in a drug rip-off in New Hampshire. Weadick was released in 1989.

==== Maine–New Hampshire faction ====
- Christian "Chris" DeMarco — associate currently affiliated with Boston, suspected of running rackets in New Hampshire, Maine and the Merrimack Valley with alleged ties to the Springfield crew of the Genovese family. As of 2026, it is alleged that DeMarco acts as a "link" between the Springfield Massachusetts faction of the Genovese family and the Patriarca family.
- John Giannelli Sr. — associate involved with an Illegal Sports betting operation in New Hampshire and Massachusetts.
- Carey Hamilton — suspected associate that was arrested in 2007 for running an illegal gambling operation.

==== New Haven faction ====
- Mariano "Mario" Grasso — associate and the son of former underboss William "The Wild Guy" Grasso. In 2004, Grasso was arrested along with New Haven, CT Mobster Anthony Ascenzia and charged with running an illegal sports betting operation.
- Eddie Parrette — leader of Connecticut faction of the Patriarca family with the base of operations in New Haven and Branford. Parrette is a longtime member of the Ascenzia-Connecticut crew, serving as the driver and bodyguard to Connecticut mobster Rico Petrello and controlling bookmaking operations for then crew leader Anthony Ascenzia. The Ascenzia-Connecticut crew can be traced back to the remnants of the crew that former caporegime William Grasso controlled before being killed in 1989. In 2020, Connecticut crew leader Anthony Ascenzia died and Parrette became the new leader. Parrette reports to Providence-based Caporegime Matthew Guglielmetti and his Connecticut crew includes mobsters John Taddei Jr. and Francis Gratta.

==== Providence faction ====
- Anthony "Ponytail Tony" Parrillo — Providence-based associate and protégé of former boss Luigi Manocchio. In August 2016, Parrillo was sentenced to five-year prison term for felony assault. He was previously served 11 years for a double homicide that he committed in 1977.
- Dino Guilmette — Providence-based associate. On July 18, 2022, former boxer and actor Dino Guilmette was arrested on drug trafficking charges in Cranston, Rhode Island. Guilmette was involved in narcotics trafficking under the authorization of Guglielmetti.

== Former members ==
=== Boston faction ===
- Vittore Nicolo "Nicky" Angiulo — former consigliere who operated from Boston's North End. Vittore Nicolo was the eldest of the Angiulo brothers. In 1983, Angiulo was indicted along with his four brothers on federal racketeering charges. He was deemed unfit to stand trial due to ill health. The FBI stated that Nick Angiulo was demoted from consigliere position after his brother Gennaro Angiulo tried to become the new boss of the family. On September 13, 1987, Angiulo died from a kidney ailment, aged 71.
- Francesco J. "Frankie the Cat" Angiulo — former soldier. Angiulo served as accountant for the Patriarca family's gambling and loansharking businesses in Boston. On September 19, 1983, he and six other mobsters, including his brothers Gennaro, Donato and Michele, were arrested on RICO charges. He was convicted of racketeering and sentenced on April 3, 1986, to 25 years in federal prison and $60,000 in restitution. Angiulo was released in 2000 and died from heart failure on May 30, 2015, aged 94.
- Donato F. "Danny" Angiulo — former capo. Born in March 1923, Angiulo was identified in 1983 as a captain based in Boston's North End. In February 1986, Donato was convicted of racketeering. He was sentenced to 20 years in federal prison and fined $40,000 in April 1986. He was paroled in 1997. Angiulo died on May 3, 2009, aged 86.
- John C. "Johnny" Cincotti — former soldier. Cincotti was born in Revere and raised in the North End of Boston. He was a protégé of Ralph Lamattina and Ilario Zannino. In November 1966, Cincotti helped clean up the murder scene after two members of Joseph Barboza's gang, Arthur Bratsos and Thomas DePrisco, were lured to and killled in Lamattina's bar, the Night Lite Café. He and Lamattina were found scrubbing blood from the floor when police arrived. In 1968, Cincotti and Lamattina assaulted Stephen Flemmi in an afterhours club. As Flemmi could not retaliate directly against Cincotti or Lamattina, who were "made men", he instead had his associate John Martorano murder Hubert Smith, an African American man who also took part in the beating. Two Black teenagers were killed alongside Smith when he Martorano shot him. Cincotti owned and operated from Bella Napoli restaurant, and oversaw several illegal casinos in the North End for Zannino and Gennaro Angiulo during the 1970s and 1980s. On September 17, 1984, he and six other mobsters were indicted on RICO charges. Cincotti was convicted of racketeering and gambling on August 14, 1986. He was sentenced to 18 years in federal prison and fined $70,000 in October 1986. Cincotti was released in 1997. He died from Alzheimer's disease on April 12, 2021, aged 81.
- Emilio "Bobby the Greaser Labella" Cucchiella — former soldier. Cucchiella operated from a coffee shop/after-hours bar in North End, Boston called Labella's. He supplied Boston mobster Johnny Martorano a World War II machine gun from his arsenal of weapons, to kill rival gangster Al "Indian" Angeli. Cucchiella was loyal to Boston Mafia capo Ilario Zannino and Providence based family boss Raymond L. S. Patriarca. Cucchiella died in 1993.
- Carmen Salvatore "The Cheese Man" DiNunzio; also known as "The Big Cheese" — former boss. During the 1980s, DiNunzio and his brother Anthony were underlings of Jerry Angiulo. Their relationship soured in 1983 after DiNunzio attempted to extort Angiulo's protégé Vincent "Dee Dee" Gioacchini, and Angiulo put a contract on him. The DiNunzio brothers sought refuge in Las Vegas and Los Angeles, where they worked as bookmakers and debt collectors for the Chicago Outfit. In 1992, they were both indicted along with the Outfit leadership on racketeering charges and sentenced to four years in prison. While incarcerated, the brothers regained their prestige in the Boston Mafia through their association with New York mobsters, and after their release in 1997, both were made into the Patriarca family by Manocchio. Shortly after, DiNunzio was made capo of the North End crew and in 2003 was promoted to underboss of the family. In 2008, DiNunzio was indicted on corruption charges stemming from an undercover operation. He pled guilty to bribery charges and was sentenced to six years in prison on September 24, 2009. In February 2015, DiNunzio was released from prison. He became boss of the family in 2017 after the death of Peter Limone. DiNunzio died on September 21, 2025, at the age of 68.
- Nicolo "Nicky" Giso; also known as "Geezer" — former soldier. Giso was born in Boston on July 14, 1923. He was a lieutenant to the Angiulo brothers and involved in gambling operations in Boston's North End. Giso also served as a liaison between Patriarca underboss Gennaro Angiulo and the Winter Hill Gang. During the 1970s, he began a relationship with 15-year-old Eva "Liz" McDonough. He fathered a son with McDonough. Giso reportedly fell out of favor with family leadership due to this relationship and his use of cocaine. McDonough drew the ire of Angiulo when she allegedly told the mother of a stabbing victim that Patriarca soldier Peter Limone carried out the attack. In 1981, Angiulo was recorded on an FBI bug planted in Ilario Zannino's office explaining his belief that McDonough should be killed as she had become "a detriment, a jeopardy, a danger" to the Mafia. McDonough was further considered a liability due to her drug use. McDonough was the cousin of Debra Davis, a girlfriend of Stephen Flemmi who was declared missing after Flemmi and James "Whitey" Bulger murdered her in September 1981. Flemmi allegedly ordered her killed after she began openly questioning him about Davis' disappearance. On March 20, 1984, Giso lured McDonough to 'One If By Land', a dive bar on Commercial Street in the North End, and asked her to wear a 10-gallon hat she owned. McDonough's headwear made her easily identifiable to two masked gunmen waiting to ambush her. She survived the murder attempt when two bullets fired at her head passed through her large hat and a third grazed her scalp. The shooting is unsolved. By 1986, Giso was in failing health, having had his larynx removed and lost the ability to speak. He died in July 1989.
- Samuel S. "Sammy" Granito — former capo. Granito was born in Brooklyn, New York in June 1907 and raised in Revere. By September 1956, he was serving a 16- to 20-year prison sentence for an armed robbery in November 1947, netting over $110,000. In 1983, Granito was identified as the captain of the East Boston crew. Granito was sentenced to 20 years in federal prison and fined $35,000 on April 3, 1986, after being convicted of racketeering. In October 1989, he attended an induction ceremony in Medford covertly recorded by the FBI, and was subsequently imprisoned. Granito died on September 26, 1997, aged 90.
- Ralph "Ralphie Chong" Lamattina — former soldier operating from Boston; Lamattina was part of capo Ilario Zannino's crew. He was the brother of fellow Boston faction soldier Joseph "Joe Black" Lamattina. He managed a coffee shop in the North End called the Nite Lite Café. According to government witness Vincent Teresa, Lamattina was in charge of the family narcotics operations. He was suspected in the murder of Irish mobster George Killeen, who was shot to death on May 20, 1950. On November 15, 1966, Lamattina was involved in the murders of Greek gangster Arthur "Tash" Bratsos and his bodyguard Thomas "Tommy D" De Prisco, who were lured into the Nite Lite Café and shot to death by Zannino. He was convicted as an accessory after the fact and sentenced to two years in prison. On September 14, 1984, Lamattina was indicted along with six other mobsters on racketeering, conspiracy and illegal gambling charges. He avoided prosecution and fled to Italy, remaining a fugitive for 11 years before turning himself in on August 14, 1995. He was sentenced to five years in prison, being released on June 1, 2000. Lamattina died on April 10, 2017.
- Dennis D. "Champagne" Lepore — former soldier. Born in September 1946, Lepore was identified as a soldier under the "Granito-East Boston crew" in 1983. In April 1992, Lepore was sentenced to between 14 and 16 years in prison for racketeering, to be followed with 5 years supervised release, and a forfeiture of $766,700.
- Peter J. "Chief Crazy Horse" Limone — former boss. In 2001, Limone was released from prison after serving 33 years for a murder that he didn't commit. Limone later won a $26 million judgment for his wrongful conviction. Limone operated from Boston and served as the family's consigliere before 2009, after which he was promoted to boss. He was arrested on gambling charges in 2009; in 2010, he was given a suspended sentence. He died on June 19, 2017.
- Joseph "J. L." Lombardo; also known as "Big Joe" — former underboss and consigliere. In 1932, Lombardo was charged with the murders of Gustin Gang leaders Frankie Wallace and Bernard "Dodo" Walsh, who were each shot dead as they entered Lombardo's headquarters, C & F Importing Co., on Hanover Street in Boston's North End in December 1931. He and two others were cleared of the charges. In order to avoid investigation in the Kefauver hearings, Lombardo retired from racketeering in 1950, turning over his gambling operations to Gennaro Angiulo. Lombardo died, aged 72, at Boston's Massachusetts General Hospital on July 17, 1969, after suffering a heart attack.
- Charles "Q-Ball" Quintina — former consigliere. Quintina was the uncle of Patriarca soldier Pryce Quintina. In his teenage years, Quintina was convicted of assault with intent to rob and armed robbery in Worcester, and sentenced to 10 to 12 years in prison. As a Revere-based capo, he operated from Fiore's Market and controlled rackets on the North Shore. In 1972, he was indicted on federal gambling charges but the case was dismissed. In late 1990, Quintina was promoted to consigliere. Quintina was arrested on February 2, 1994, with three former members of his crew, on RICO charges. He pleaded guilty and was sentenced on April 5, 1995, to five years in prison. He was released on June 12, 1998. Quintina died on August 12, 2001.
- Alexander Santoro "Sonny Boy" Rizzo — former underboss. Rizzo was born in 1913. He was a major organized crime figure in Revere for decades. Rizzo was a suspect in the May 5, 1959 murder of Hull gambler Philip Goldstein, who was found garrotted to death in the trunk of Rizzo's car in Kingston, New Hampshire. On November 21, 1959, the murder charge against Rizzo was dismissed due to a legal technicality because the indictment failed to specify that the crime he was accused of took place in the United States. In 1994, Rizzo was indicted along with three other aging Revere mobsters, known as "the Oldfellas", on federal racketeering charges relating to illegal gambling and extortion. On April 5, 1995, he was sentenced to five years in prison after pleading guilty. Rizzo was released June 12, 1998. He died, at the age of 91, on January 20, 2005.
- Joseph "J. R." Russo — former consigliere. Russo was a capo of an East Boston crew and headed a renegade faction in an unsuccessful attempt to seize control of the family from Raymond Patriarca Jr., who promoted Russo to consligliere as part of a truce to end the rebellion. He was convicted of racketeering in 1992 and died from cancer in federal prison in 1998.
- Francis Patrick "Frankie Boy" Salemme Jr. — former soldier. Frank Salemme Jr. was the son of Frank Salemme Sr. and nephew of John Salemme. He operated under the protection of the Winter Hill Gang while his father was in prison between 1973 and 1988. Salemme Jr. and associate Paul Weadick had a history of "ripping off" drug dealers. He also had a reputation as a violent gangster frequently engaged in fist fights. Salemme Jr. was marked for death after defrauding a drug ring backed by Patriarca family soldier Joseph Lamattina over a marijuana deal in 1983, and was only saved by the intervention of Winter Hill gangster Stephen Flemmi. In 1985, Salemme Jr. was involved in a feud with North End associate Jimmy Limoli after a $100,000 marijuana rip-off and subsequent robbery of $100,000 in cocaine belonging to Patriarca soldier Anthony Spagnolo, resulting in Limoli being shot to death. In 1987, Salemme Jr. and Weadick were arrested by New Hampshire State Police after a cocaine deal. In 1992, he was indicted on charges of bribing Teamsters union officials to allow a Hollywood film company to shoot scenes in Boston and Providence using non-union labor. Salemme Jr. and his father became the owners of The Channel, a South Boston rock club, using club manager Steven DiSarro as a straw man. DiSarro came under investigation by the FBI and IRS for money laundering and bank fraud relating to real estate deals in which he was involved and testified before a federal grand jury in April 1993. Fearing that he would be implicated, Salemme Sr. ordered DiSarro killed. Salemme Jr. and Weadick strangled DiSarro to death at the home of Salemme Sr. in Sharon on May 10, 1993. His body was then buried behind a mill in Providence. Salemme Jr. died from AIDS-related leukaemia on June 23, 1995, aged 38.
- John J. "Action Jack" Salemme — former acting boss. John Salemme was the brother of Frank Salemme. With Brian "Ballonhead" Halloran, he was dispatched to resolve a dispute with the drug dealer George Pappas, who had defrauded a joint cocaine and marijuana venture operated by the Patriarca family and the Winter Hill Gang. During a meeting with Pappas at the Four Seas Chinese restaurant in Boston's Chinatown in the early hours of October 13, 1981, Halloran shot Pappas in the head and killed him. Salemme and Halloran were charged with Pappas' murder. Halloran was then killed by Winter Hill boss James "Whitey" Bulger on May 11, 1982, after he became an FBI informant. After almost two years as a fugitive, Salemme surrendered to Boston police in March 1983. He was convicted of first-degree murder on February 13, 1984, and sentenced to serve life at Cedar Junction State Prison. In 1985, the verdict was overturned by the Massachusetts Supreme Judicial Court. Salemme's partial Irish ancestry initially prevented him from becoming a "made" member of the family but he was inducted after his brother Frank became the boss in the early 1990s. He was then promoted to capo. When Frank Salemme became a fugitive, John Salemme served as acting boss during 1995 and 1996. Salemme died on May 23, 2024, at the age of 81.
- Frederick "Freddie the Neighbor" Simone — former soldier. Born in April 1950, Simone was identified as a member of the "Granito-East Boston crew" in 1983. In 1988, Simone was sentenced to a 15 to 20-year prison sentence for participating in the June 1981 murder of Angelo Patrizzi, and by 2000, he had been released from prison. In December 2000, Simone was arrested for firearm charges. In December 2003, Simone pleaded not guilty to 29 charges, including extortion, loan sharking, illegal gambling and money laundering, law enforcement alleged Simone had engaged in loansharking and protection payments between 1991 and January 2002.
- Antonio L. "Spucky" Spagnolo — former consigliere and acting boss. Spagnolo was born in Boston on January 13, 1942 and was a lifelong resident of Revere. He was a member of the family's East Boston faction who worked with Robert Carrozza and Carrozza's stepbrother J. R. Russo. In 1976, Spagnolo and East Boston capo Russo murdered notorious New England mob turncoat Joe "the Animal" Barboza in San Francisco. During the 1980s, Spagnolo reported to East Boston capo Biagio DiGiacomo, a Sicilian-born New England mobster operating from the Roma restaurant. In the late 1980s, FBI undercover agent Vince DelaMontaigne, infiltrated the DiGiacomo crew and Spagnolo ran illegal cards games with the agent. It is believed Spagnolo was inducted into the Patriarca family in October 1989. In 1990, he participated in a Mafia induction ceremony where they burned the card of a saint at a house in Medford, and he was arrested afterwards. In 1990, Spagnolo was arrested with Vincent Giacchini after it was revealed that DelaMontaigne infiltrated their East Boston crew headed by DiGiacomo. In March 1991, Spagnolo was sentenced to over nine years in prison for racketeering and drug dealing charges, and was released in 2000. After his release, Spagnolo took over as capo of the East Boston crew. In the early 2000s, Spagnolo started a feud with soldiers Frederick Simone and Vincent Gioacchini over gambling territory in East Boston. The feud almost led to an internal war until then-boss Luigi "Baby Shacks" Manocchio and Rhode Island–based captain Matthew Guglielmetti were able to settle it. In early 2000, Spagnolo and Gioacchini were indicted and charged with extortion. In 2012, Spagnolo became the family's acting boss. On October 2, 2014, Spagnolo and Pryce "Stretch" Quintina were arrested and charged with extorting thousands of dollars in protection payments from a video poker machine company. In May 2016, Spagnolo was sentenced by U.S. District Judge Patti B. Saris to over a year and a half in prison with a $5000 fine, after pleading guilty in December 2015 for conspiring to interfere with interstate commerce by extortion. He was released from prison in October 2017. Spagnolo became consigliere in 2024. Spagnolo died of natural causes at the age of 84, on September 29, 2026.

=== New Haven faction ===
- Anthony "Tony the Beaver" Ascenzia — former made member who operated a multimillion-dollar illegal sports betting operation in Greater New Haven, Connecticut, area for the family. Ascenzia shared the New Haven gambling profits with his Providence-based capo Matthew Guglielmetti. In 2004, Ascenzia was sentenced to three years in prison and fined $25,000 after pleading guilty to racketeering and tax fraud. Ascenzia died on July 23, 2020.
- Louis R. Failla — former soldier. Born in December 1927, Failla was identified as a member in 1983. Failla served as a soldier under the "Grasso-Connecticut crew". In August 1991, Failla was convicted of racketeering, he had also been accused of extortion and loansharking. He died in August 1999.
- Gaetano J. Milano — former soldier. Milano was born in Naples, Italy in October 1951 and immigrated to the United States with his family in 1955, settling in Longmeadow, Massachusetts. He began his career in organized crime as an associate of the Connecticut faction of the Colombo family before joining the Patriarca family's Hartford, Connecticut crew headed by William Grasso. Milano was inducted into the Patriarca family in 1985 and served as the organization's liaison to the Springfield, Massachusetts faction of the Genovese family. After learning that he was targeted for elimination by Grasso in a power struggle, Milano joined the Genovese Springfield crew to carry out the murder of Grasso in June 1989. Milano was one of 21 mobsters indicted on federal charges in March 1990. He was granted bail of $1.6 million in October 1989 while being held for conspiracy and racketeering. Milano accepted a plea deal and renounced his membership in the Mafia but refused to testify against his co-defendants. In August 1991, Milano was sentenced to 33 years in prison for racketeering offenses which included the murder of Grasso. He was released in April 2013. Milano died from heart disease on February 9, 2026, aged 74.
- Americo "Cigars" Petrillo — former soldier. Born in March 1934, Petrillo was identified as a member in 1983, serving as a soldier under the "Grasso-Connecticut crew". In August 1991, Petrillo was convicted of extortion and operating an illegal gambling den based in Hartford, Connecticut, he was sentenced to 6 years in prison. He died in December 2007.

=== Providence faction ===
- Stephen "Peanuts" Broccoli — former soldier. Born in July 1914, Broccoli served as a soldier under the Rhode Island regime. Between 1935 and 1952, Broccoli had been arrested numerous times for participating in illegal gambling, robbery in Rhode Island, carrying a firearm and crashing a car. In May 1952, Broccoli was sentenced to 7 years in prison for robbery.
- William "Blackjack" DelSanto — former soldier. Born in November 1943. According to law enforcement, DelSanto became a soldier in the Patriarca family during the 1970s, and he was identified as a soldier under the Rhode Island regime in 1983. DelSanto served as a city sidewalk inspector and allegedly as driver to Providence Mayor Buddy Cianci. He died in January 2022.
- Edward C. "Eddie" Lato Jr.; also known as "Little Eddie" — underboss of the family from 2020 to 2024. A former capo and career criminal, Lato had 32 arrests and 18 convictions by 2012. He was part of Frank "Bobo" Marrapese's crew during the 1970s and 1980s. Lato was investigated for the September 1992 murder of Patriarca family enforcer Kevin Hanrahan, who was shot to death by two masked gunmen outside a steakhouse in Federal Hill. On March 25, 1999, Lato and several members of his crew were indicted on racketeering and loansharking charges after a four-year FBI investigation. He was sentenced to five years in prison, being released in 2004. Lato was arrested and charged with leading an illegal sports betting ring in Providence on December 10, 2006. In 2011, he was arrested on May 6 for involvement in an illegal gambling ring along with Marrapese, Alfred "Chippy" Scivola, and 23 others; on November 19, 2014, he was given a 10-year suspended sentence and 10 years of probation. Then, he was indicted on September 22, 2011, on racketeering and extortion charges stemming from his shakedown of Providence strip clubs along with Scivola and retired boss Manocchio, among others. Lato received the stiffest sentence in the case; nine years in prison. He was released from prison and into a Pawtucket halfway house on January 30, 2019. Lato was identified as the family underboss in a State Police affidavit released in 2022 which mentioned him attending a Christmas party on December 22, 2020, with other Patriarca family mobsters and Conti, who was investigated for corruption allegations. He died of natural causes on August 23, 2024.
- Luigi "Baby Shacks" Manocchio — served as boss of the family from 1996 to 2009, when he stepped down. In 2011, he was arrested for his involvement in "shaking down" Rhode Island strip clubs. In 2015 he was released from prison. Manocchio died in Bristol, Rhode Island, on December 8, 2024, at the age of 97.
- Frank "Bobo" Marrapese — former soldier. Born in March 1943, Marrapese was identified as a member in 1983, serving as a soldier under the Rhode Island regime. In April 1988, Marrapese was sentenced to life imprisonment for the murder of Richard Callei in March 1975. Marrapese had been acquitted in the May 1982 murder of Anthony “The Moron” Mirabella, who was killed at the Fidas restaurant in Providence, and also for the August 1982 murder of Ronald McElroy, who was beaten to death with a baseball bat after accidentally cutting off Marrapese and his friends, who were street racing in Providence. Marrapese was released from prison in May 2008. Marrapese was indicted in May 2011, after a six-month joint investigation by the Office of Attorney General and the Rhode Island State Police. In November 2013, Marrapese pleaded guilty to one count of racketeering, five counts of conspiracy to commit extortion and one count of conspiracy to commit usury, he was sentenced to 9 years in prison. In September 2017, Marrapese was denied parole. He died in December 2017.
- Edward J. Romano — former capo. Born in November 1924, Romano served as a captain based in Rhode Island. In August 1969, former U.S. Attorney General John N. Mitchell identified Romano as a captain in the Patriarca family to the Senate Investigations Committee.
- Rudolph "Rudy" Sciarra — former soldier. Born in March 1924, Sciarra served as a soldier under the Rhode Island regime. In June 1981, Sciarra was convicted of supplying two firearms used in the murder of Raymond "Baby" Curcio in February 1965, Curcio had burglarised the home of Joe Patriarca, the younger brother of former boss Raymond Patriarca, Sciarra was sentenced to life imprisonment. He died in March 2012.
- Alfred "Chippy" Scivola Jr. — former soldier operating from Rhode Island. Scivola was arrested in January 1983 along with capo Frank "Bobo" Marrapese for purchasing a hundred La-Z-Boy chairs they knew to be stolen. In 2005, he was convicted of shaking down Stamford, Connecticut, strip clubs and was sentenced to two years in prison. On September 23, 2011, Scivola was indicted along with retired boss Luigi "Baby Shacks" Manocchio and five others of extorting a number of strip clubs in Providence. He was sentenced to nearly four years in prison and was released on January 23, 2015. Scivola died on July 14, 2017.
- Albert J. Vitali — former soldier. Born in April 1924, Vitali served as a soldier under the Rhode Island regime. In 1967, Vitali was convicted of possessing stolen goods. He died in July 2014.

== Former associates ==
=== Boston faction ===
- Michele A. "Mike" Angiulo — former associate. Angiulo helped control an extensive numbers racket operated by the Angiulo brothers in the Boston area. He and six other mobsters, including his brothers Gennaro, Donato and Francesco, were arrested on RICO charges on September 19, 1983. Michele Angiulo was acquitted of racketeering but convicted of gambling, and sentenced to three years in federal prison on April 3, 1986. He died on November 29, 2006, aged 79.
- Jason Brion Angiulo — former associate. Jason Angiulo was the son of Gennaro Angiulo. He was the manager and supervisor of a series of "Las Vegas night" gambling events operated in the Boston area between 1978 and 1981. The events were purported to be held to raise money for charity, but the profits were in fact kept by the Patriarca family. Angiulo and six other mobsters were indicted on RICO charges on September 17, 1984. On August 14, 1986, he was acquitted of racketeering but convicted of gambling. Angiulo was sentenced in October 1986 to three years in federal prison and fined $20,000. He was released on September 12, 1989.
- Salvatore "Sal" Cesario — former associate. Cesario was a drug trafficker and former professional boxer from Boston's North End who controlled the Patriarca family's narcotics racket. He also had links to New Jersey through his association with Newark-based Gambino family capo Joseph Paterno. Cesario was sentenced to five years in prison in 1953 after he was arrested for selling heroin at a hotel in the South End of Boston. Ralph Lamattina subsequently took over the family's drug operations. Cesario was arrested for loansharking in 1964.
- Vincent A. DeSciscio — former associate. DeSciscio was a partner-in-crime of East Boston gangster, Joseph "J. R." Russo, with whom he formed a duo known as the "Gold Dust Twins" due to the wealth they accumulated. DeSciscio died from cancer.
- Willie Fopiano — former associate. Fopiano was a minor gangster in Boston's North End who later relocated to Las Vegas. Fopiano released a book, The Godson, in 1993, in which he claimed to have worked for Meyer Lansky.
- Carmen Raymond "Gags" Gagliardi — former associate. Gagliardi was a Patriarca family "hit man" during the Boston gang wars of the 1960s. On April 8, 1967, he shot and killed North End bartender and police informant Joe Lanza. Afterwards, police in Medford stopped the car in which Gagliardi and two associates were traveling, finding Lanza's body sitting upright on the front passenger seat. Gagliardi escaped and was placed on the FBI Ten Most Wanted Fugitives list. He was arrested at his mother's home in Medford on December 23, 1968. Gagliardi was convicted of second-degree murder and imprisoned at Walpole State Prison, where he was a suspect in the November 25, 1973 murder of Albert DeSalvo, the alleged "Boston Strangler". He died at Walpole of a drug overdose in January 1975.

=== Providence faction ===
Stephen DeSarro — former associate. DeSarro grew up in the Federal Hill neighborhood of Providence and was a lawyer before getting involved in the real estate and nightclub businesses.

== Government informants and witnesses ==
- Joseph "The Animal" Barboza — former associate (1967)
- Vincent "Fat Vinnie" Teresa — former soldier (1971)
- Angelo "Sonny" Mercurio — former soldier (1987/1988)
- John "Sonny" Castagna — former soldier (1991)
- Antonino "Nino" Cucinotta — former soldier (1995)
- Francis Patrick "Cadillac Frank" Salemme Sr. — former boss (1999). Salemme was a hitman for the Patriarca family and the Winter Hill Gang during the Boston gang wars of the 1960s. In 1973, he was sentenced to sixteen years in prison for organizing the 1968 car bombing of John Fitzgerald, an attorney representing mob informant Joseph Barboza. Upon his release in 1988, he was inducted into the Patriarca family. Salemme was a member of Raymond Patriarca Jr.'s faction during a power struggle, and survived a shooting by rival mobsters outside a pancake house in Saugus on June 16, 1989.
- Mark Rossetti — former capo (2010)
- Robert "Bobby" DeLuca — former capo(2011)

== List of murders committed by the Patriarca crime family ==
Name	Date	Reason
James "Jimmy" Bratsos	March 21, 1954	Greek mobster Bratsos had cooperated with police after surviving a shooting by three assailants before he was sent to state prison for burglary in 1951. A month following his release, 28-year-old Bratsos disappeared. He was allegedly summoned to a meeting with Ilario Zannino at a bar in Boston's Syrian Town, where he was drugged before being shot and buried on a farm in Stoughton, Massachusetts.
Wilfred J. "Will" Delaney and Harold A. Hannon	August 20, 1964	Hannon and Delaney carried out a series of burglaries on the homes of Mafia-protected bookmakers. Days after their last heist, an $80,000 robbery on the North Shore, the duo were forced off the road while driving in Boston's Franklin Park and taken to an apartment in Mattapan, where both men were beaten. 54-year-old Hannon was tortured and strangled to death, while 27-year-old Delaney drowned when both men were thrown into Boston Harbor. Their bodies were discovered in the harbor the same day.
Teddy Deegan	March 12, 1965	Deegan was possibly an associate of the Patriarca at the time of his death. Deegan was found shot 6 times and killed located at an alleyway off Fourth Street in Chelsea, Massachusetts as he had robbed $40,000 from a bookmaker aligned with the Patriarca family. According to information by Joe "The Animal" Barboza, he had implicated Louie Greco, Peter "The Crazy Horse" Limone, Henry "The Referee" Tameleo and Joseph "Joe the Horse" Salvatt as the killers, however this was later proven as a lie, with the real preparators being Barboza and Vincent "Jimmy the Bear" Flemmi.
Willie Marfeo	July 13, 1966	Marfeo was killed by a shotgun blast whilst inside of a phone booth located outside of the Korner Kitchen Restaurant in Federal Hill, Providence, Rhode Island. It is believed Marfeo was killed as a result of getting into an argument with Raymond Patriarca regarding refusal to pay tribute money to the family and cursing at him, Marfeo had also assaulted Henry "The Referee" Tameleo, the consigliere of the family at the time.
Arthur C. "Tash" Bratsos and Thomas J. "Tommy D" DePrisco	November 15, 1966	36-year-old Bratsos and 25-year-old DePrisco were members of Joseph Barboza's East Boston Gang and had been extorting local businesses in order to raise bail funds for the jailed Barboza. The pair were lured to the Nite Lite Café in Boston's North End, where they were shot, stabbed and beaten to death, and robbed of over $50,000 they had collected, by a number of Patriarca mobsters. A third man, Joseph Amico, escaped. Bratsos' and DePrisco's bodies were put into the trunk of Bratsos' car, which was dumped in the Lower End neighborhood of South Boston, in order to give the appearance that the murders had been carried out by an Irish gang.
Joseph W. "Chico" Amico	December 7, 1966	27-year-old East Boston gangster Amico was killed with a carbine rifle, allegedly by Joseph Russo, in a drive-by shooting as he left a bar in Revere during the Patriarca family's extermination of Joseph Barboza's gang. Another Barboza gang member, James Kearns, survived the attack.
Edward A. "Wimpy" Bennett	January 18, 1967	47-year-old Bennett, the leader of the Roxbury Gang, was involved in a territorial dispute with Patriarca mobster Ilario Zannino. He was also stealing from a numbers racket which he operated with Stephen Flemmi. Bennett was lured by Peter Poulos to a garage in Boston's Roxbury neighborhood owned by Frank Salemme, where he was shot by Flemmi. He was buried by Flemmi and Salemme on a shooting range in Hopkinton, Massachusetts.
Walter Bennett	April 3, 1967	55-year-old Bennett, a member of the Roxbury Gang, was strangled by Stephen Flemmi and Frank Salemme after he became hostile and threatened to avenge the killing of his younger brother, Edward. He was buried by Flemmi and Salemme next to his brother on a Hopkinton firing range.
Joseph F. "Joe" Lanzi	April 18, 1967	Lanzi, a 30-year old Patriarca associate and police informant, was killed by Benjamin DeChristoforo, Carmen Gagliardi and Frank Oreto, shot once in the head and three times in the chest. Police found Lanzi's body after a car chase in Medford, Massachusetts, in the front of a rental car driven by Gagliardi and in which DeChristoforo and Oreto were passengers.
William F. "Billy" Bennett	December 23, 1967	56-year old Bennett talked openly about his suspicions that Stephen Flemmi and Frank Salemme had killed brothers, Edward and Walter. He was shot after being picked up from his home by Richard Grasso and Hugh "Sonny" Shields. Bennett's body was thrown from the car on Harvard Street near Blue Hill Avenue in Dorchester. Flemmi, Salemme, Robert Daddieco and Peter Poulos assisted in a "cover car".
Richard R. "Richie" Grasso	December 23, 1967	34-year-old Grasso was allegedly shot by Robert Daddieco on the orders of Stephen Flemmi and Frank Salemme after botching the murder of William Bennett by allowing his body to be found. His body was discovered in the trunk of his car in Brookline, Massachusetts on December 29, 1967.
Rudy Marfeo & Anthony Melei	April 7, 1968	42-year old Marfeo and his friend, Anthony Melei, were shot and killed inside of Pannone's Market on Pocasset Avenue in Providence, possibly as a result of Marfeo attempting to avenge the death of his brother, Willie Marfeo, whom was also gunned down in July 1966.
Thomas Timmons	April 30, 1968	Timmons, a 47-year-old associate of Edward Bennett, was ordered killed by Ilario Zannino after he kidnapped Patriarca associate Abe Sarkis. He was kidnapped from a bar in Boston's Hyde Park and taken to the home of Frank Salemme in Sharon, Massachusetts, where he was strangled by Richard Assad with the assistance of Zannino, Salemme and Stephen Flemmi. Timmons' body was buried.
Alfred "Keystone Al" Lepore	March 9, 1975	Lepore was closely affiliated with Richard Callei. It is believed Lepore was murdered with the assistance of Frank "Little Frankie" Martellucci, as retaliation for threatening to harm the children and wife of John "Big Johnny" Chakouian.
Richard "Dickie" Callei	March 14, 1975	41-year old Callei was repeatedly stabbed in his face, chest and abdomen, he was also hit in the head by a blunt object, reportedly fracturing his skull in three places, and was shot five times in his back by using a .38 caliber handgun at the Acorn Social Club in Providence, Rhode Island. Frank "Bobo" Marrapese was later charged with involvement in Callei's slaying.
Joe "The Animal" Barboza	February 11, 1976	Barboza was an enforcer and contract killer for the Patriarca family, confessing to involvement in 26 murders. In early 1967, Barboza became an informant for the FBI. 43-year old Barboza was shot and killed by a shotgun blast whilst hiding in San Francisco located at near the corner of 26th Avenue and Moraga Street by Joseph "J.R." Russo after an associate of Jerry Angiulo had tipped him off regarding his current whereabouts.
Giacomo Angelo "Jackie" DiFronzo	December 11, 1977	22-year-old DiFronzo was a member of a rival gang in Boston's North End which was extorting and robbing Mafia-backed underground casinos. He was shot in an apartment which was then set on fire, allegedly by Vincent Ferrara and Vincent Limoli.
Elliot Bassett	April 26, 1978	Bassett, a drug smuggler who was being extorted by the family, was thrown from the window of a hotel room in Manhattan, New York by George Basmajian and Gerald "Jerry" Tillinghast after he was charged in a case involving the seizure of seven tons of marijuana in Rhode Island.
Joseph "Joe Porter" Patrizzi	November 11, 1978	38-year-old Patriarca associate Patrizzi owed a $450,000 debt to boss Raymond Patriarca. He was shot dead, and his body found in a stolen automobile in Revere. Frederick Simone and Cono Frizzi were allegedly involved in the killing.
George Basmajian	November 30, 1978	28-year-old loan shark and hit man Basmajian was shot nine times and left in a car in Providence, Rhode Island by the brothers Harold and Gerald Tillinghast because he was indiscreet about his criminal activities.
Anthony "Dapper Tony" Corlito	July 21, 1979	20-year-old Corlito carried out a string of burglaries in the North End of Boston and was reportedly seeking revenge on mafiosi for killing his associate, Jackie DiFronzo. He was shot five times in a Hanover Street parking lot, allegedly by Vincent Ferrara, Vincent Limoli and Pasquale Barone.
Angelo Patrizzi	March 13, 1981	The 38-year-old half-brother of Joseph Patrizzi vowed to avenge the murder of his half-sibling by killing Simone and Frizzi. On June 11, 1981, three months after he disappeared, Patrizzi was found hog-tied and asphyxiated to death in the trunk of a car in Lynn.
Ronnie McElroy	August 24, 1982	20-year old McElroy was murdered after he had interrupted a drag race on Broadway in Providence. McElroy was reportedly beaten to death by using an aluminium baseball bat. In 1988, Frank Marrapese and his friend, Bobby Walason, were found not guilty of McElroy's murder.
Vincent James "Jimmy" Limoli	October 28, 1985	25-year-old Patriarca associate Limoli stole $50,000 in cash and $100,000 in cocaine belonging to Mafia soldier Anthony "Spucky" Spagnolo in September 1985. The following month, he was lured to a meeting with Pasquale Barone and Walter Jordan under the guise of a drug deal in Boston's North End, where he was fatally shot once in the head.
William "Billy the Wild Guy" Grasso	June 16, 1989	62-year-old underboss Grasso, a loyalist to boss Raymond Patriarca Jr., was shot once in his neck and killed inside a moving van by a Genovese crime family Springfield faction hit team. The murder was orchestrated by a rival faction led by Joseph Russo. Grasso's body was discovered in the Connecticut River in Wethersfield, Connecticut.
Howard Ferrini	August 14, 1991	Ferrini, a 53-year-old Fall River, Massachusetts bookmaker and Russo loyalist, was found in the trunk of his car in the parking lot of Logan Airport on August 21, 1991, after he was beaten and asphyxiated to death with a plastic bag at his Berkley, Massachusetts home a week earlier. He was killed to allow Frank Salemme's faction to take control of rackets in the area. Kevin Hanrahan was allegedly one of Ferrini's killers.
Robert "Bobby D" Donati	September 24, 1991	50-year old Donati was killed as a result of the Salemme and Ferrara war for control of the Patriarca family. Donati served as a driver for Vincent Ferrara and was killed by the Salemme faction. He was beaten, hog-tied and stabbed to death at his home in Revere, Massachusetts, and was found in the trunk of his Cadillac vehicle.
Barry Lazzerini	October 3, 1991	45-year old Lazzerini was beaten and shot to death at his home in Manomet, Massachusetts. Lazzerini had served as a Ferrara loyalist and was killed by the Salemme faction.
Kevin Hanrahan	September 18, 1992	39-year old Hanrahan was from Irish ancestry and served as an associate for the Patriarca family. Hanrahan worked for the Salemme faction during the time of his death and it is believed he was murdered for his freelance stance without total loyalty to the Salemme-Patriarca family. Hanrahan was shot 3 times in the head and killed on the corner of Atwells Avenue outside The Arch Restaurant in the Federal Hill neighborhood of Providence, Rhode Island.
Rocco Scali	October 2, 1992	Scali was shot once in the head and killed whilst inside of his vehicle located at the parking lot of a pancake house on Route 1 in Dedham, Massachusetts. It is believed Scali was killed by the Salemme faction as he had been a Ferrara loyalist.
Vinnie Arcieri	December 6, 1992	27-year old Ferrara loyalist Arcieri was shot and killed outside of his home located at 117 Faywood Street in East Boston by the Salemme faction. It is believed prior to his murder that Arcieri had gotten himself involved in a verbal altercation with Salemme-Patriarca family capo Mark Rossetti.
Steven DiSarro	May 10, 1993	Patriarca associate and nightclub owner DiSarro was seen as a liability during an FBI investigation into The Channel nightclub in South Boston, in which Frank Salemme held a stake. DeSarro was strangled to death by Frank Salemme Jr. with the assistance of Paul Weadick as Frank Salemme Sr., John Salemme and Stephen Flemmi looked on at Salemme Sr.'s home in Sharon, Massachusetts. DeSarro was buried by a mill in Providence. In 2004, Frank Salemme was sentenced to 5 years in prison after he lied to the FBI at a debriefing in 1999 accusing Nicky Bianco of ordering the DiSarro murder in 1993.
Joseph "Joe the Animal" Savitch and Louis "Miami Beach Louie" Alexander	February, 1994	Both men were heavily active within the Fall River, Massachusetts area. It is believed both men were killed by Gerard "the Frenchman" Ouimette with the assistance of Timmy Mello due to a dispute with the Salemme faction. The bodies of the pair were not discovered until August 1997 in a wooded area of Masardis in Maine.
Mike Romano Jr.	September 2, 1994	According to the Romano family, 20-year old Mike Romano Jr. was shot and killed in Everett, Massachusetts as a case of mistaken identity, with the intended target being Enrico Ponzo. Romano's father, Mike Romano Sr., had allegedly been associated with the Russo-Ferrara faction and with Bobby Carrozza.
Joe Souza	October 31, 1994	37-year old Souza was shot on Bennington Street in East Boston, next to Barney's Café, and succumbed to his death almost two weeks after. It is believed Souza was killed by the Russo-Ferrara faction as he was held responsible as the shooter in the September 1994 murder of Mike Romano Jr.
Paul Strazzula	December 11, 1994	25-year old Strazzula, a Salemme faction loyalist, was found killed in a car which was set ablaze.
Bobby Luisi, Sr., Roman Luisi, Antonio Sarro and Anthony Pelosi	November 6, 1995	The four men were Salemme faction members and were gunned down inside of the 99 Restaurant & Pub in Charlestown, Boston, including 55-year old Luisi Sr., 26-year old Roman Luisi, 32-year old Sarro and 53-year old Pelosi, with around 13 shots fired at the men. Richard Sarro was also targeted at the restaurant however he survived with a gunshot in his stomach. Anthony Clemente, Damian Clemente and Vincent John Perez were arrested and charged in connection with the shooting. In May 1997, 48-year old Anthony Clemente and 22-year old Damian Clemente were sentenced to life in prison.
Richard "Vinnie the Pig" DeVincent	April 3, 1996	63-year old DeVincent had once served as a bookmaker and loanshark for Jerry Angiulo, and clashed with the Frank Salemme faction after he was released from prison, reportedly over street tax, DeVincent was shot and killed in Medford, Massacheutts.
Robert "Bobby the Beast" Nogueira	November 24, 1996	Nogueira had served as a Russo-Ferrara loyalist and enforcer. Nogueira was closely affiliated with Vincent "Gigi" Marino, serving as his bodyguard and enforcer. Nogueira was shot over 20 times in the parking lot of the Comfort Inn hotel in Saugus, Massachusetts. During the same night, Vincent Marino escaped an assassination attempt outside of the Caravan Club in Revere, Massachusetts, being shot in the buttocks. Later in 2000, Marino was sentenced to 35 years in prison for his involvement in 3 murders and 7 murder conspiracies, and was released in August 2024 after serving 27 years in prison.
Robert "Bobby Rogers" Santasky	June 29, 2000	Associate for the Patriarca crime family. Santasky was possibly about to testify against a member of the Patriarca crime family as he had information regarding a murder committed in 1999, it is believed his murder was ordered by Luigi "Baby Shacks" Manocchio and committed by William "Billy The Angel" Angelesco.
Pete DeVito	December 12, 2001	DeVito was shot 3 times in the head and abdomen due to a dispute with Patriarca family member, Billy "The Angel" Angelesco, as DeVito ejected Angelesco from the Centerfolds strip club located at 12 Lagrange Street in Boston over an argument.
Mark Eldridge	April 3, 2002	Associate for the Patriarca crime family. Eldridge was shot once in the face and killed inside of a cafe in Somerville, Massachusetts due to internal fighting within the crime family with another faction in the Patriarca crime family.
Patsy Squillante	November 5, 2004	Associate for the Patriarca crime family. It is believed Squillante was murdered as the administration were concerned of the possibility of Squillante cooperating with the authorities as he had knowledge of a murder during 2000.
Napoleon "Nappy" Andrade	March 10, 2019	Associate for the Patriarca crime family. It is believed Andrade was shot and killed at the parking lot of a Rhode Island halfway house, weeks after release from a prison term for money laundering over $42,000, possession of fifteen one pound packages of marijuana, possession and robbery of 840 cartons of cigarettes valued at over $30,000, possession with the intent to distribute 500 grams or more of cocaine, possession of a handgun, possession of 100 grams of crack cocaine, stolen jewellery and money. It has been alleged Andrade was murdered, as he had angered members of the Gambino crime family for robbing the home of Gambino family member Nicolo "Nick the Greaser" Melia, in Connecticut in 2010, prosecutors said that Andrade had stolen $200,000 worth of jewelry, more than $16,000 in cash and a double-barreled shotgun.

== In popular culture ==
- The 2006 film The Departed, centered around an Irish mob crew in Boston, briefly refers to a rival Italian Mafia organization based in Providence, possibly inspired by the Patriarca family. At one point in the film, two gangsters from Providence appear before being killed by the Irish gang.
- The Patriarca crime family is considered an important part of the plot of the 2015 biopic crime film Black Mass, as they are considered the main enemies of the Winter Hill Gang, led by the bloodthirsty James "Whitey" Bulger (played by Johnny Depp). In the film, the Winter Hill Gang is involved in a bloody feud with the Boston branch of the Patriarca crime family, led by Gennaro "Jerry" Angiulo (played by Bill Haims), who was also the leader of the Angiulo Brothers and the underboss of the main branch (or Providence branch) of the Patriarca crime family (which was led at that time by Raymond L. S. Patriarca, the fourth boss of the Patriarca crime family).

== See also ==
- Crime in Massachusetts
- Crime in Rhode Island
- History of Italian Americans in Boston
- List of Italian Mafia crime families
