= Robert Carrozza =

American mobster

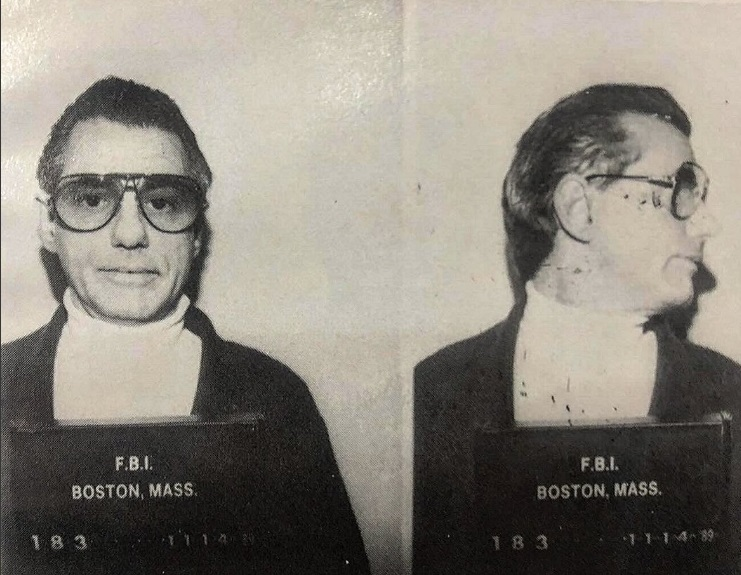
- Carrozza's November 14, 1989 FBI mugshot
- Born: Robert Francis Carrozza; January 9, 1940 (age 86); Winthrop, Massachusetts, U.S.
- Other name: "Bobby Russo"
- Occupation: Mobster
- Relatives: Joseph Russo (stepbrother)
- Allegiance: Patriarca crime family
- Conviction: Racketeering (1992)
- Penalty: 19 years' imprisonment (1992)

Robert Francis Carrozza (born January 9, 1940), also known as "Bobby Russo", is an American mobster from East Boston, Massachusetts, who led a bloody internal rebellion against the leadership of the Providence, Rhode Island-based Patriarca crime family. As of 2026, Carrozza is the reputed Boss of the Patriarca Crime Family.

== Criminal career ==
Carrozza was born January 9, 1940, in Winthrop, Massachusetts, to Mario Carrozza and Marie Mosca. After Robert’s mother died in 1944, his father remarried Angelina Abbatessa Russo, who had also been previously married. Angelina was the mother of Patriarca crime family capo Joseph "J.R." Russo, who was most well known for his role in murdering mob contract killer Joseph Barboza in San Francisco, California, in 1976. Russo was later convicted under the Racketeer Influenced and Corrupt Organizations Act and sent to prison where he died of natural causes in 1998 in Springfield, Missouri. Carrozza would later use his stepbrother's last name "Russo" as an alias when involved in organized crime.

=== Internal conflict ===
In 1989, a violent internal conflict fractured the Patriarca family. A "renegade faction" led by Carrozza, his stepbrother and family consiglieri Joseph Russo, and mobster Vincent "the Animal" Ferrara challenged the leadership of boss Raymond "Junior" Patriarca and family associate Francis "Cadillac Frank" Salemme. By seizing family leadership, Carrozza and the other renegades sought to control illegal gambling and the extortion of bookmakers, drug dealers and restaurant owners in the Greater Boston area. This takeover attempt provoked a gang civil war that lasted until 1996 and claimed over a dozen lives.

On June 16, 1989, the body of Patriarca underboss William "Billy the Wild Man" Grasso was found with a bullet wound to the head along the banks of the Connecticut River in Wethersfield, Connecticut. Five hours after the discovery of Grasso's body, gunmen shot and seriously wounded Salemme at a restaurant in Saugus, Massachusetts. On June 27, 1989, informant and former Patriarca family member, Angelo "Sonny" Mercurio told Federal Bureau of Investigation (FBI) agent John "Zip" Connolly that Russo, Ferrara and Carrozza had planned and executed both shootings. Much of the Patriarca family's legal troubles resulted from this relationship between James "Whitey" Bulger, leader of Boston's Winter Hill Gang, and Connolly. In exchange for Bulger providing Connolly with incriminating information on the Patriarca family, Connolly protected Bulger and his criminal operations from law enforcement.

On March 26, 1990, Carrozza and twenty other family members were indicted on racketeering, extortion, narcotics, illegal gambling, and murder charges. The Patriarca arrests were described as "the most sweeping attack ever launched on a single organized crime family." One of the most damaging pieces of evidence was a tape recording of a Cosa Nostra induction ceremony attended by thirteen Patriarca family members. On January 6, 1992, Carrozza's attorney, Henry D. Katz, offered Carrozza a plea bargain in which the government promised not to prosecute him for the Grasso murder, an offense that could carry a life sentence, and for the attempted murder of Salemme. Carrozza accepted the plea bargain and was sentenced to 19 years in prison. In 1993, 26 others were indicted and convicted for running a bookmaking operation.

=== Carrozza's activities from prison ===
In 1991, Salemme became boss of the Patriarca family and the family conflict escalated. Both factions wanted to collect the family's extortion payments and control its other business. Anthony Ciampi, a key Carrozza faction member, owned a club on Bennington Street in East Boston, the site of gambling and illegal card games, that was frequented by Carrozza faction members.

Following Carrozza's sentencing in April 1992, it took nearly two years for the "renegade faction" to plan its revenge. Ciampi and Michael P. Romano, Sr. visited Carrozza several times in prison in Pennsylvania. The FBI contended that the two men sought Carrozza's permission to continue the war against Salemme. Assistant United States Attorney Jeffrey Auerhahn claimed, "Robert Carrozza supplied legitimacy. You can’t take on a Mafia member unless you have one with you." Using Ciampi's social club as the group's headquarters, the "renegade faction" in 1994 retaliated against Salemme by killing several of his supporters.

=== 1997 federal indictment ===
On April 8, 1997, federal authorities indicted 15 members of the "renegade faction" for three murders, seven murder attempts, and seven planned murders. Carrozza was named as the sole "made man", or full member, of the Patriarca family of those indicted. Sean Thomas Cote, the first of four indicted members to turn government witness, dominated the grand jury testimony that produced the indictments. Carrozza was accused of orchestrating the "renegade faction's" activities from prison, largely through Ciampi and Michael Romano, Sr.

At a July 1999 court hearing, Carrozza announced that he would represent himself at the new trial. Despite efforts by District Judge Nathaniel Gorton to dissuade him, Carrozza remained adamant. On November 1, 1999, Carrozza began his opening statement at the trial with the comment "I’m a little nervous." He then told the jury that he previously confessed to being part of an "enterprise" during his 1992 trial and then stated, "Unlike some witnesses in this case, I accept the fact that I’m guilty of crimes and accept punishment for them." Carroza informed jurors that despite prison authorities monitoring his mail and phone calls since 1989, prosecutors lacked any evidence that he had conspired with the other indicted men.

One month into the trial, Carrozza's former attorney offered prosecutors a plea bargain agreement from Carrozza. In exchange for pleading guilty to a felony charge of gambling across state lines, two more years would be added to Carrozza's existing prison sentence and he would be exempted from testifying in any federal grand jury investigation of the Patriarca family or from cooperating with the government. A deal was worked out and Carrozza served his expanded sentence at the Federal Correctional Institution, Allenwood Medium in White Deer Township, Pennsylvania. On March 23, 2008, Carozza was released from prison.

=== Mob boss ===
In April 2025, it was reported that Carrozza that been promoted to acting boss of the Patriarca family while official boss Carmen "the Big Cheese" DiNunzio struggled with health problems. Following DiNunzio's death in September 2025, Carrozza became the reputed head of the family.
