= Raymond Patriarca =

Raymond Patriarca (Italian pronunciation: [paˈtrjarka]) may refer to:

- Raymond L. S. Patriarca, Providence mobster and founder of the Patriarca crime family
- Raymond Patriarca Jr., Providence mobster and former leader of the Patriarca crime family
