= Angelo Mercurio =

American mobster

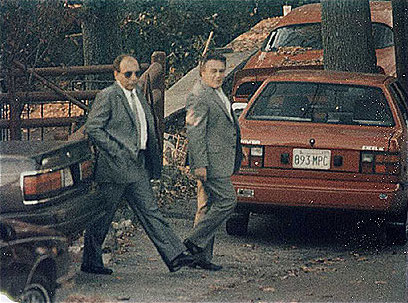
Federal Bureau of Investigation surveillance photograph of Mercurio (right), with Raymond Patriarca, Jr. (left)

Angelo "Sonny" Mercurio (1936 – December 11, 2006) was an Italian-American mobster and a member of the Patriarca crime family who became an FBI informant that recorded for the first time a mafia induction ceremony. This recording led to the incarceration of family boss Raymond Patriarca Jr. and several other high ranking mafioso. It also became a source of embarrassment for the organization. Subsequently after incarceration Mercurio was entered into the Witness Protection Program.

== History ==
Born in the West End section of Boston, Mercurio grew up working in the family bakery in Malden, Massachusetts. He had a fleeting resemblance to actor John Garfield. In 1954, at eighteen years old, Mercurio and two others robbed a gas station in Revere, Massachusetts. They shot and killed 72-year-old Harry Abelovitz after he resisted. In 1955, all three youths pleaded guilty to second degree murder and were sentenced to life in prison. In 1962, he was granted clemency by the Massachusetts Executive Council with the support of Governor John A. Volpe. After serving time in prison again, from 1978–86, for trying to sell $23 million worth of stolen securities in an FBI entrapment, Mercurio established a successful Italian food shop in the Prudential Tower in Boston.

When he came out of prison, Mercurio was disgruntled with the Patriarca family because they had not helped his family with money while he was incarcerated. Meanwhile, the Irish American Winter Hill gangsters and FBI informants Whitey Bulger and Steve Flemmi gave his girl money every week. They got along since he was the go between for Jerry Angiulo, the boss of Boston's mob that had suzerainty over Winter Hill.

Mercurio was soon working for the Patriarca family, serving as a liaison between them and the Irish Winter Hill Gang in Boston. Bulger and Flemmi thought they might be able to flip him for their handler, Federal Bureau of Investigation (FBI) agent John Connolly. During the 1980s, the FBI obtained incriminating evidence on Mercurio by electronic surveillance at his food shop.

After Anguilo was sent to prison, the new leadership of Boston's mob thought they had a perfect meeting place at Mercurio's shop. An underground parking garage and a freight elevator led to the room where they conducted business. They figured that they could not be followed, and therefore could not be bugged. The only problem was that Steve Flemmi was invited up to discuss business. He drew FBI agent John Connolly a map of how to get there, so he could bug the place. The FBI gathered enough evidence to indict Mercurio and others for extorting a couple of elderly bookmakers for a quarter of a million dollars. Because he was being pressured and threatened by opposite forces, Mercurio became an FBI informant, in 1987.

== FBI informant ==
Mercurio lured mobster Francis "Cadillac Frank" Salemme to a meeting in June 1989, outside a Saugus, Massachusetts International House of Pancakes restaurant, where gunmen ambushed the unarmed Salemme as restaurant patrons dining inside ducked for cover. Wounded in the chest, Salemme took cover in the restaurant's vestibule, but ran back outside to prevent bystanders from being hurt, suffering a wound to his leg.

In 1989, Mercurio informed the FBI about an upcoming family induction ceremony at a home in Medford, Massachusetts. Mercurio surreptitiously recorded the ceremony, the first time in U.S. history that a mob induction was taped. Attendees at the ceremony included Raymond Patriarca, Jr., underboss Nicholas Bianco; consigliere Joe Russo; and caporegimes Biaggio Digiacoma, Vincent Ferrara, Matthew Guglielmetti, Dennis Lepore, and Robert Carrozza. While the ceremony was taking place, Mercurio even turned down the television volume in the home to improve the recording. Mercurio's recordings led to the prosecution and conviction of dozens of criminals. In 1991, Patriarca pleaded guilty to racketeering and conspiracy charges and was sent to prison for seven years. After Patriarca's indictment, Mercurio disappeared from New England to avoid indictment himself.

Mercurio said he innocently met FBI special agent, John Connolly, in the Prudential Center in the fall of 1987, after Vanessa's had been searched. He was still disgruntled from the humiliation of being successfully bugged, accused the FBI of trying to plant evidence during their secret forays into the store and bragged that the Mafia had outsmarted them. He was trying to best John Connolly in a battle of insider information. Connolly calmly rattled off the name of the Patriarca crime family's inside source for law enforcement information. Mercurio had unknowingly confirmed that the Patriarca crime family had a law enforcement source, and he knew what it meant if the FBI exposed his Top Echelon Informant status. Angelo's conversation restored Stephen Flemmi's Top Echelon Informant status in November 1987. In less than a year, Mercurio had joined Flemmi as a Top Echelon Informant, and was constantly feeding the FBI inside information on his associates in the Patriarca crime family. In some ways he even supplanted Bulger and Flemmi in importance- the FBI and the Organized Crime Strike Force were targeting the Patriarca crime family, Robert Carrozza, J.R. Russo and Vincent Ferrara, and as a member of their inner circle, Mercurio was privy to information that even Flemmi could not obtain. He threw himself into his informant role enthusiastically- even though he had been the best man at Vincent Ferrara's first wedding, this did not stop him from thoroughly informing on the illicit activities of his old friend. Mercurio's value as an informant made protecting him a priority.

== Prison ==
In 1994, Mercurio was convicted in Georgia of possessing 150 pounds of marijuana and was sent to prison there. He was also arrested because he tried to shoplift a $500 Shimano fishing reel in a Sandy Springs sporting goods store. He put the fishing reel in his pocket and just walked out of the store, giving the manager at the front a "stop me, I dare you, look". The manager, a marathon runner, gave chase, and Mercurio made it about two blocks before collapsing on the sidewalk. Mercurio was booked on shoplifting but released since the alias he was using that day was not in the FBI national crime database. A short time later, though, he was pulled over on suspicion of drunk driving, and this time his fraudulent driver's license was a match. When word got back to the Boston FBI that Mercurio had been arrested, FBI Special Agent Michael Buckley visited him in jail. Soon afterward, he pleaded guilty in the Vincent Ferrara case. The government asked for nine years. Despite his obvious role in the attempted murder of Frank Salemme, it was significantly less time than J. R. Russo, Vincent Ferrara and Robert Carrozza received. Not only that, but federal prosecutors recommended that it be served concurrently with Mercurio's ten-year sentence in Georgia. In June 1997, Mercurio was brought back to Boston from prison in Georgia to testify in the trial of Patriarca boss Frank Salemme. His revelation in court as a government informant was a tremendous surprise to the Patriarca family. After this testimony, Mercurio was sent back to prison. In 2000, Mercurio's sentence was reduced. On his release from prison, Mercurio entered the Federal Witness Protection Program and was secretly relocated to Arkansas. According to Mercurio's lawyer, Mercurio in later years was conflicted about becoming an informant and betraying the Patriarca family but believed he himself was the victim of their betrayal.

== Death ==
On December 11, 2006, Mercurio died of a pulmonary embolism in Little Rock, Arkansas.
