= Luigi Manocchio =

American mobster (1927–2024)

Luigi Giovanni Manocchio
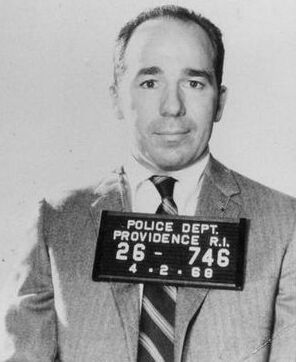
- 1968 mugshot of Manocchio
- Born: June 23, 1927; Providence, Rhode Island, U.S.
- Died: December 8, 2024 (aged 97); Bristol, Rhode Island, U.S.
- Other names: "Baby Shacks", "Louie", "The Professor", "The Old Man"
- Occupations: Crime boss, mobster
- Allegiance: Patriarca crime family
- Conviction: Extortion (2012)
- Penalty: Five and a half years' imprisonment

Luigi Giovanni "Baby Shacks" Manocchio (June 23, 1927 – December 8, 2024) was an American mobster from Providence, Rhode Island. He was the boss of the New England-based Patriarca crime family, which is part of the American Mafia.

== Biography ==
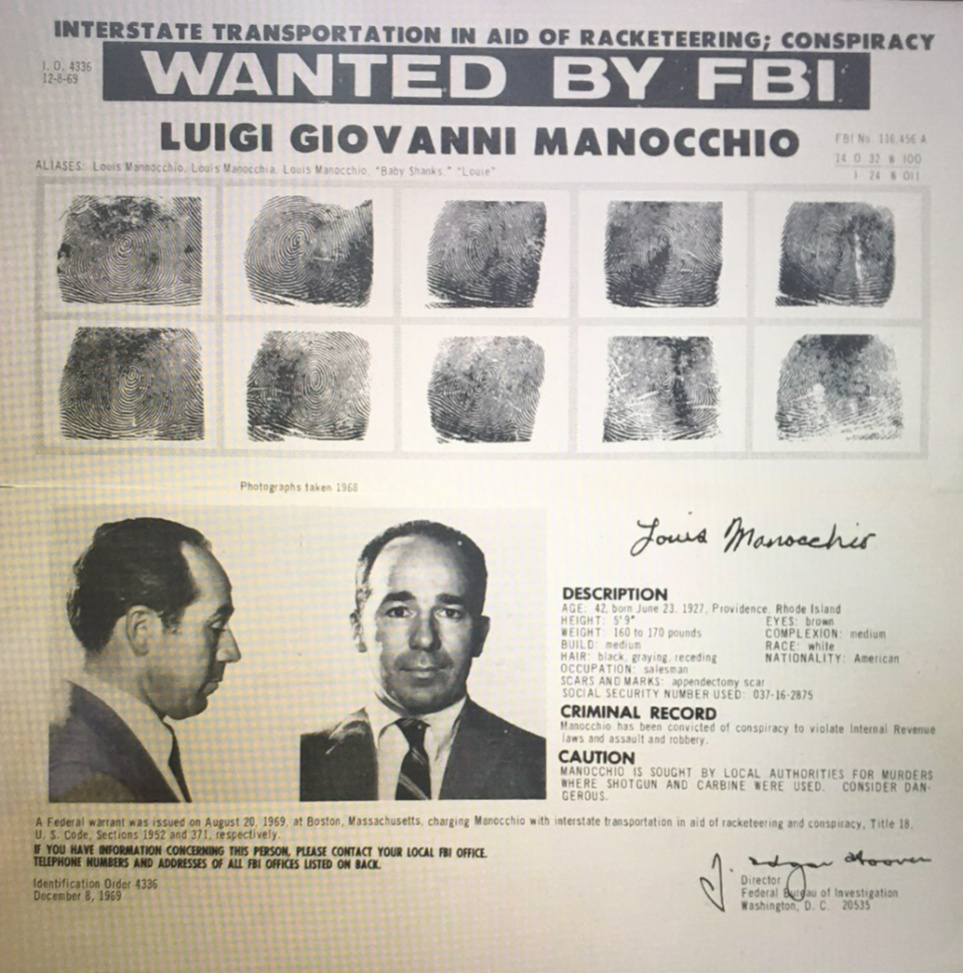
1969 FBI Wanted Poster of Manocchio

Manocchio had a criminal record dating back to the 1940s. In November 1967 he was shot in the neck and seriously wounded during a running gun battle on Federal Hill in Providence. In 1969, Manocchio was indicted for participating in the murders of Rudolph Marfeo and Anthony Melei. He fled to France, but later returned to the United States, living undercover in New York City for most of the 1970s. In 1979, Manocchio finally surrendered to law enforcement and pleaded guilty to several lesser charges. He was sentenced to 30 months in prison.

In July 1996, Manocchio was indicted with 43 others in a burglary ring. Prosecutors claimed that this Patriarca-sanctioned gang was responsible for stealing $10 million in merchandise. When his trial began in April 1999, Manocchio pleaded guilty to reduced charges and was sentenced to three years of probation. From that point, Manocchio continued his steady rise in the ranks of organized crime, becoming boss in 1996.

Manocchio was promoted to boss of the Patriarca family following the imprisonment of many of the organization's other leaders. He was described as a "shrewd, opportunistic old-school leader who excels at keeping a low profile" and "tough and capable". Mannochio's headquarters was a laundromat in the Federal Hill section of Providence.

In March 1999, the Federal Bureau of Investigation (FBI) charged family enforcer Jim Palumbo in New Haven, Connecticut, and associates Rocco Folco and Anthony St. Laurent with loan sharking. In December 2004, Palumbo was named, but not indicted, and later jailed, in a case involving Boston mob captain Frederick Simone as the defendant. The indictment identified Manocchio as Patriarca family boss, Alexander "Sonny Boy" Rizzo as underboss, Rocco Argenta as consigliere and Carmen DiNunzio, Mark Rosetti and Matthew Guglielmetti as capos.

On January 20, 2005, the FBI raided the Providence office of the Laborers' International Union of North America (LIUNA) and the offices of Capital City Concrete in Cranston, Rhode Island, all part of an investigation into labor racketeering in the Rhode Island construction business. Among those arrested in the Capital City raid was Guglielmetti, who was charged with overseeing distribution of cocaine bound for Canada, and money laundering.

In November 2009, Manocchio reportedly ceded control of the Patriarca family to mobster Peter Limone. Limone died of cancer on June 19, 2017.

On January 20, 2011, Manocchio was indicted on charges of extorting payments from the owners of the Cadillac Lounge and Satin Doll club, both adult entertainment establishments in Providence. The indictment listed his nicknames as "Louie", "The Professor", "The Old Man", or "Baby Shacks". In 2012, Manocchio pleaded guilty and was sentenced to five and a half years in prison. Manocchio told the court: "By virtue of my position, I inherited the deeds of my associates" and "I simply do not want my family or my friends to believe I personally threatened anybody."

On May 12, 2015, Manocchio was moved from federal prison in Butner, North Carolina, to a halfway house in Providence. On November 4, 2015, Manocchio was released.

Manocchio died in Bristol, Rhode Island, on December 8, 2024, at the age of 97.

American Mafia
| Preceded by Frank Salemme | Patriarca crime family Boss; 1996–2009 | Succeeded by Peter Limone |
