= Gerard Ouimette =

American mobster and author

- Born: March 6, 1940; Providence, Rhode Island, United States
- Died: April 19, 2015 (aged 75); Butner, North Carolina, United States
- Burial place: Rhode Island
- Other names: "The Frenchman"
- Occupation: Mobster
- Years active: 1960s–1994
- Employer: Raymond L.S. Patriarca
- Organization: Patriarca crime family
- Criminal charge: Extortion (1995)
- Criminal penalty: Life sentence without parole
- Relatives: John Ouimette (brother)

Gerard Thomas Ouimette (March 6, 1940 – April 19, 2015), commonly known as The Frenchman, was an American mobster and author from Providence, Rhode Island who was a prominent associate of the Patriarca crime family. He served for years as one of Raymond L. S. Patriarca's lieutenants, and also headed his own faction of the Patriarca mob.

== Early life ==
Ouimette was born on March 6, 1940, in Providence, Rhode Island. His parents were both of French descent. His father worked as the Governor of Rhode Island's chauffeur. He had to resign when he contracted tuberculosis, which is contagious, and found work as a taxicab driver. As his illness progressed, he eventually had to go live in a sanatorium. The family would visit him there once a month, followed by routine exams to make sure they did not contract the disease. His father died in 1948, when Ouimette was seven.

After his father's death, Ouimette's mother struggled to raise him and his eight siblings. During that time, Catholic nuns provided emotional and material support for the Ouimette family, bringing them food and clothing and checking in nearly every day. Soon, they were forced to move from their middle-class neighborhood to the poorer Federal Hill area.

=== Criminal background ===
Ouimette's criminal activities began in the 1950s. After his father died, he and his brother would shoplift to make some money. His first court appearance came when he was ten, when he was charged with criminal possession of a firearm. He was arrested in an alley, holding a gun, which he claimed he picked up after it was dropped by a man fleeing law enforcement. Nevertheless, his mother could not afford an attorney, and he was sent to the Sockanosset School for Boys, a reformatory in Cranston, Rhode Island. There, after several fights with other boys, some school teachers took him around to boxing clubs to perform. After ten months, he was allowed to return home.

In 1956, when Ouimette was 16 years old, he was given a series of psychological tests. The psychiatrist who conducted them concluded:

It seems likely that, because of the nature of this boy's problems, and because of the lack of acceptable moral principles, he will indulge in delinquent behavior again.

In the late 1950s, he did a stint of service in the US Army. In 1959, two months after turning 18, he was sentenced to six years in prison for robbing, at gunpoint, a South Providence jewelry store. During his third year in prison, his two oldest brothers, Alvin and Billy, both in their 20s, died in a construction accident. A few months later, he was granted parole, and moved in with his mother in East Providence. Soon after, he was sent back to prison for a parole violation.

== Mob career ==
=== 1960s ===
Ouimette first met mob boss Raymond L. S. Patriarca in the mid-1960s, when a friend brought him around to Patriarca's cigarette store, his mob headquarters. Soon after, he carried out his first task for Patriarca: acquiring stolen Cadillacs. His mob activities only escalated thereafter. On January 24, 1969, Ouimette and his brother John were arrested on charges that they shot a Pennsylvanian mob hitman outside a Cranston restaurant. At that time, Ouimette was already serving a five-year sentence for possession of a gun after a crime of violence. The brothers were ultimately acquitted after the victim told the jury that the Ouimettes were not the ones that shot him.

The 1960s also saw Ouimette gain his famous nickname "The Frenchman." It may have originated in the Ouimette's unique ancestry in a mostly-Italian American mob. Ouimette himself credited police with the name, writing in his 2012 memoir:

'The Frenchman' is the name that Rhode Island police attached to me in 1969 since I am proud of my French descent, an anomaly in that neighborhood. Due to ensuing notoriety, the name stuck.

=== 1970s ===
On July 9, 1972, while still in prison on the gun possession charge, Ouimette was convicted of conspiracy to kill Michael Greene and Homer Perkins, career criminals who had been found murdered three years prior. He was sentenced to ten years in prison, and was sent to the Adult Correctional Institutions (ACI), a maximum security facility in Cranston. There, operating out of the prison's North State Wing, where the mafiosos lived, Ouimette continued to lead his gang from behind bars, and had enormous influence and freedom within the prison. There, he even had influence over the warden. According to state police, he essentially "ran the place." Patriarca was in and out of prison, and Ouimette served as his second-in-command at the ACI, which they used as a recruiting ground for the mob.

Ouimette had a telephone installed in his cell, which was supposed to be used for his work with National Prisoners' Reform Association, but in reality was used to continue managing his organized crime from within the prison. In March 1977, Ouimette called Vincent Vespia, a state police detective sergeant, at his home and threatened to break his jaw. Vespia got dressed, drove to the prison and ripped the phone from the wall. Vespia said, "I was incensed that he had a phone. He had no reaction. What was he going to say? I think he was surprised to see me." Ouimette was convicted for threatening Vespia and was sentenced to an extra 36 days, though the conviction was later overturned on appeal.

Every week, Charles Kennedy, a member of his gang, would smuggle in $500 to $600 worth of canned hams, cold cuts, cheese, Italian bread, marijuana, and alcohol for Ouimette and his gang. The situation was such that Kennedy would walk past the front guard desk, with no questions asked, and corrections officers would deliver the food directly to Ouimette's first floor cell. Once, Kennedy was arrested by state police for attempting to deliver Ouimette a case of 46-ounce soda cans that had been emptied, filled with whiskey, and then resealed.

Besides Ouimette, there were other members of his crew in the north wing, including his brother John, Chuckie Flynn, a mobster from Lowell, Massachusetts, and two convicted killers, Ronnie Sweet and Maurice Lerner, a Massachusetts native and mob hitman who was once a professional baseball player. Ouimette and his gang would walk to a second-floor lawyer's meeting room and get drunk on smuggled alcohol in styrofoam cups. One time, he had his five-year-old son smuggled into his cell for a sleepover, state police said. John Gotti, boss of the Gambino crime family and a close friend, would sometimes come to visit him.

Well-noted were the catered lobster dinners Ouimette and his crew often enjoyed. William Kunstler, the lawyer and civil rights activist, once joined them for one of these occasions (Kunstler had once defended him in court). A photo of one of that dinner, published in The Providence Journal, was captioned thus:

This extraordinary photograph of a lavish mob dinner inside the maximum security unit of the Adult Correctional Institutions was taken sometime in the 1970s. It's unclear who shot the photo, how the food was brought inside the prison, or why radical civil rights lawyer William Kunstler was allowed to travel unescorted inside the prison.

Due to a reduced sentence, Ouimette was released from prison on 29 October 1977. However, he was rumored to be a "marked man" by rival organized crime groups, placing his life in danger upon his release. A source speaking to the Associated Press said that Ouimette was targeted for execution while in prison, but was never "hit." The source explained that the reason was because some mob leaders believed Ouimette had a tendency to get "too big for his britches." One Providence Journal reporter even prepared an obituary, convinced Ouimette would be killed. Ultimately, nothing came of it and he was never harmed.

Ouimette's position within the mob was secure, even after five years in prison. In 1977, Gerald McDowell, the head of the US Department of Justice's Boston-based Organized Crime Strike Force, told a gathering of local businessmen that Rhode Island organized crime is controlled by two men, one in "Federal Hill," (Raymond Patriarca), and the other "in the ACI" (Ouimette). State police detective Captain Brian Andrews described Ouimette as the "Prince of Atwells Avenue," the stronghold of organized crime in New England.

Ouimette was not a made member of the mob because he was not Italian, but an FBI report from April 16, 1979, reported that he was the leader of a non-Italian faction within the Patriarca crime family:

Subject OUIMETTE controls a large group of criminals known as the OUIMETTE faction, whose criminal activities include gambling, loansharking, extortion and property violations such as major hijackings, robberies and burglaries. Although not Italian, OUIMETTE enjoys the same stature as lieutenants under RAYMOND L.S. PATRIARCA, who controls organized crime (OC) in the Boston and New England area.

The document also said that federal authorities believed Ouimette was responsible "for seven or eight gangland-style murders." Despite this, Ouimette was never convicted of murder, but he was regularly a suspect in mob killings in Rhode Island and the rest of New England. He was acquitted twice of murder and attempted murder charges in Rhode Island and southeastern Massachusetts.

=== 1980s ===
In 1980, Ouimette had a falling-out with Charles Kennedy, one of his enforcers. Kennedy claimed Ouimette told him, "You want to be your own fucking guy? Let's see how long you last," and organized a hit squad to kill him. Around the same time, Vincent Vespia, the state police detective, also claimed that Ouimette had a contract out to kill him. Ultimately, neither Kennedy nor Vespia were harmed.

In 1981, Ouimette was charged with the murder of John Barbieri, an East Greenwich businessman with mafia ties whose body was found in Rehoboth, Massachusetts, with a bullet in the back of the head. He was acquitted. A year later, he and three other men were arrested for assaulting Douglas Gomes, a convict, at a café in Providence. Police said that Ouimette dropped a .38 caliber revolver on the floor when he saw them. The weapon had an obliterated serial number. In February 1984, he was convicted of weapons charges and sentenced to 18 years in federal prison.

=== 1995 extortion trial ===
Ouimette was released on parole on October 28, 1994, and moved to Fall River, Massachusetts, but was tracked daily by local, state, and federal law enforcement. Less than five months later, Ouimette was arrested yet again, charged with having extorted $125,000 from Paul A. Calenda, a Cranston restaurant owner, and for attempting to extort $5,000 from Providence car dealer and mob associate David Duxbury. Ouimette was charged alongside fellow mobster Robert P. Deluca Sr.

At the trial future U.S. Senator Sheldon Whitehouse represented the government as prosecuting attorney. Ouimette was the first criminal from New England to be prosecuted by Whitehouse as U.S. Attorney for Rhode Island. At trial, the federal government presented evidence that in early 1995, Ouimette was involved in two acts of extortion: the first involved efforts to collect a loan made to Paul Calenda and the second was an attempt to receive money from David Duxbury. The government presented as evidence several recorded conversations in which Ouimette threatened to commit violence against Calenda. As Whitehouse put it: "A couple of Rhode Islanders were told that they would need to pay money and if they didn't they would be hurt fairly severely."

In addition to the recordings, a variety of witnesses, including some of Ouimette's former mob associates, showed up to testify. The case involving Calenda included testimony from Paul Copolla, who claimed to have overheard a conversation between Ouimette and Calenda in which Ouimette demanded a payment of $125,000 and threatened to commit a variety of violent acts against Calenda. James Gellerman, an alleged co-conspirator in the Calenda crime, pleaded guilty and agreed to cooperate with the government. He testified that one time at St. Rocco's Club in Providence in February 1995, Ouimette had instructed him to "crack" Calenda to get him to repay the alleged loan, and that Paul Parenteau was present for this conversation.

The government's Duxbury case relied exclusively on testimonial evidence. These witnesses included Duxbury, Gellerman, the widow of a mobster whom Ouimette had an affair with, and strippers from the Satin Doll nightclub in Providence. Gellerman and Duxbury both testified that Ouimette had assaulted Duxbury one night at the Satin Doll and demanded he pay a sum of $5,000 by the next day. Gellerman further testified that the next day, Ouimette had met with him at a restaurant and instructed him to go to Duxbury's car dealership, along with Parenteau and Harry Drew, so the three men could collect the money. Gellerman said that Parenteau and Drew were also present at the restaurant when this conversation took place.

In addition, several strippers who worked at the Satin Doll were called to the witness stand to testify regarding Ouimette's assaults and threats against Duxbury at the strip club. Ouimette struck an intimidating presence in the courtroom, and when he rose from his chair at one point during the testimony, the strippers became so fearful that they broke into tears and refused to even look in his direction.

In autumn 1995, Ouimette and Deluca were convicted on both counts of extortion. At the sentencing on February 1, 1996, U.S. District Judge Ernest C. Torres said, "There is no suspense left here," and sentence Ouimette to life imprisonment without parole. Ouimette was the first criminal in New England, and the fourth in the United States, to be sentenced to life imprisonment without parole, the mandated sentence for criminals convicted of three or more violent offenses under the "three strikes and you're out" provision of the 1994 Violent Crime Control and Law Enforcement Act. Deluca was sentenced to 10.5 years for his role.

At the sentencing, Ouimette briefly addressed the court, criticizing the federal government for relying on paid witnesses to make its case. He claimed prosecutors had abused the system, saying, "As long as there are abuses, people like me are going to get hurt. That's all I have to say." He was then handcuffed and escorted from the courtroom by armed federal marshals. He appealed the decision, but the appeal was rejected.

== Death ==
Ouimette died on April 19, 2015, aged 75, at the Federal Correctional Complex in Butner, North Carolina, a medium-security prison where he had spent the previous 19 years. He died in his sleep 10 days after being diagnosed with lung cancer. He had also suffered from heart disease and other health issues.

His death was confirmed by Rhode Island State Police Colonel Steven O'Donnell, who called Ouimette "one of the most notorious villains Rhode Island has ever known." His body was sent back to Rhode Island for a funeral and burial.

Ouimette had more than ten criminal convictions in his life, including one for punching an FBI agent. He had spent 46 years of his life in prison, from Adult Correctional Institutions in Rhode Island to federal prisons, including the Lewisburg Penitentiary in Pennsylvania and the Marion Penitentiary in Illinois. At the time of his death, he was working to appeal his last conviction.

== Personal life ==
At 24, shortly after his release from his first prison sentence, Ouimette impregnated a local girl, Frances Gravelle. He told her marriage was not an option given his lack of employment, and the couple would not consider abortion because they were Catholic. Instead, Gravelle planned to raise their boy as a single mother and Ouimette gave her some money.

Ouimette was raised Catholic but stopped believing in God after his two brothers died in a construction accident.

== Works ==
- What Price Providence? (2010) self-published memoir written while in prison
