= Vincent M. Ferrara =

American mobster

Vincent Ferrara
- Born: Vincent M. Ferrara; 1949 (age 76–77); Boston, Massachusetts, U.S.
- Other name: "The Animal"
- Occupation: Mobster
- Allegiance: Patriarca crime family

Vincent M. Ferrara (born 1949), also known as "the Animal", is an American mobster from Boston, Massachusetts who is a "made" member of the New England-based Patriarca crime family.

== Criminal career ==
Ferrara became affiliated with the Patriarca crime family in the 1970s as an associate in a regime, or "crew", headed by Donato "Danny" Angiulo in the North End of Boston. In the late 1970s, a rival North End gang began robbing card games operated by the Angiulo brothers, resulting in Gennaro "Jerry" Angiulo hiring Ferrara to kill the hoodlum Giacomo "Jackie" DiFronzo. On December 11, 1977, Ferrara, along with Vincent "Jimmy" Limoli, allegedly shot DiFronzo dead at an Endicott Street club and then set the club on fire. Afterwards, an associate of DiFronzo, Anthony "Dapper" Corlito, sought vengeance on Ferrara. On July 21, 1979, Ferrara, Limoli and Pasquale "Patsy" Barone allegedly shot Corlito to death after encountering him on Fleet Street. Ferrara was inducted as a "made" member of the Patriarca family in 1980.

On October 28, 1985, Patsy Barone and Walter "Fats" Jordan shot Limoli to death in Boston's North End and subsequently fled the state. In July 1988, Jordan was arrested in North Carolina and Barone was arrested in Ohio. Jordan reached an agreement with Assistant U.S. Attorney Jeffrey Auerhahn to become a cooperating witness, confessing that he and Barone had taken part in Limoli's murder.

On March 22, 1990, Ferrara was indicted on racketeering and related charges with six other alleged members and an associate of the Patriarca Family. More specifically, Ferrara, Raymond J. Patriarca, J.R. Russo, Robert Carrozza, Dennis Lepore, Carmen Tortora, Pasquale Barone and Angelo Mercurio, who was, significantly, a fugitive, were charged with violating the Racketeer Influenced and Corrupt Organizations Act (RICO), by conspiring to participate in the affairs of a racketeering enterprise, and doing so, through a pattern of racketeering acts that included murder, extortion, and other crimes, some of which were also charged as separate substantive offenses. Three years later, under a plea agreement with the government just as his case was about to go to trial, he pleaded guilty to racketeering, extortion, gambling, and ordering the 1985 slaying of Boston mobster Vincent "Jimmy" Limoli. The murder was apparently the result of a narcotics transaction gone bad. Ferrara received a 22-year sentence.

=== Release from prison ===
After serving 16 years in prison, Ferrara was released on April 12, 2005. U.S. District Judge Mark L. Wolf ruled that several years were to be cut from Ferrara's sentence after finding that a prosecutor, Assistant United States Attorney Jeffrey Auerhahn, had withheld evidence during plea negotiations. Specifically, a key witness had tried to recant his claim that Ferrara had directed his codefendant Pasquale Barone to murder Vincent Limoli. Wolf concluded that Ferrara was denied due process and was probably innocent of Limoli's slaying, but pled guilty rather than risk a wrongful conviction. If Ferrara had been aware of the recantation, the judge decided, he may not have agreed to the deal that sent him to prison for 22 years. Ferrara, a father of five, was placed on supervised release for three years and prohibited from contact with any convicted felons during that time. Ferrara has stated that he will not return to his criminal past. As of 2022 Ferrara is operating a business which combines valet parking service and garage management.
