= Raymond Patriarca Jr. =

American mobster

- Born: Raymond Joseph Patriarca; February 24, 1945 (age 81); Providence, Rhode Island, U.S.
- Other names: "Ray Junior"; "Junior Patriarca"; "Rubber Lips"; "Ray Rubber Lips"
- Occupation: Crime boss
- Parent: Raymond L. S. Patriarca
- Status: Released
- Allegiance: Patriarca crime family
- Conviction: Racketeering (1992)
- Penalty: 8 years' imprisonment

Raymond Joseph Patriarca (/ˌpætriˈɑːrkə/; born February 24, 1945), known as Raymond Patriarca Jr., is an American former mobster from Providence, Rhode Island, son of mob boss Raymond L. S. Patriarca, after whom the Patriarca crime family was named. He was boss of the crime family, which has a faction in Providence and another in Boston, Massachusetts, for six years after the death of his father in 1984.

== Early years ==
Patriarca was born in Providence, Rhode Island, on February 24, 1945, to mobster Raymond L. S. Patriarca and Helen G. Mandella, who died in 1965. Both of his parents were of Italian descent.

== Crime family ==
In 1970, Raymond Patriarca Sr., nicknamed "Il Patrone", was convicted of murder and conspiracy to commit murder, along with several of his mob family associates. He was sentenced to 10 years in prison but continued to run his crime family while there.

Patriarca Sr. continued to be pursued by law enforcement for the rest of his life, and he was charged for a variety of crimes until his death in 1984. In 1983, he was charged with the murder of Raymond Curcio, and he was arrested in 1984 for the murder of Robert Candos, whom the mob boss believed was an informant.

"Il Patrone" died of a heart attack, aged 76, on July 11, 1984, bringing into question the leadership succession of the New England crime family.

== New boss ==
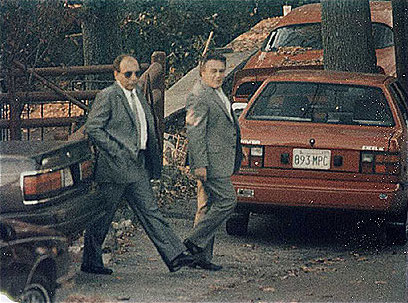
Federal Bureau of Investigation surveillance photograph of Angelo "Sonny" Mercurio (right), with Raymond Patriarca Jr. (left)

The New England Mafia began a period of slow decline resulting from legal prosecution and internal violence after the death of Patriarca Sr. Gennaro Angiulo was the family underboss until he was incarcerated, and he attempted to take over as boss despite being in jail. However, Ilario "Larry" Zannino, the family's top captain, backed Patriarca. The National Commission approved Patriarca's ascendancy to leadership with the backing of the Gambino crime family, and his position was confirmed. Angiulo was demoted and Zannino was made consigliere.

Patriarca was considered a weak leader compared to his father, but he managed to keep the peace in his crime family due to the support of the Gambino family of New York. Zannino was sentenced to 30 years in prison in 1987, which further weakened Patriarca's position. With Zannino in jail, William Grasso became underboss; he was known for his ruthlessness, and some law enforcement officials believed that he was actually in charge. However, these rumors ended when Grasso was murdered in June 1989 by a Springfield, Massachusetts-area gangster with ties to the Genovese crime family. Nicholas Bianco then took over the family's Providence operations.

On March 26, 1990, Patriarca, underboss Bianco, and 20 other family members and associates were indicted on numerous charges, including racketeering, extortion, narcotics, gambling, and murder. The arrests were described as "the most sweeping attack ever launched on a single organized crime family". One of the most damaging pieces of evidence was a tape recording of a Mafia induction ceremony at which 13 criminals were present. The FBI was able to match Patriarca's voice to the tape due to a radio interview. Because of this embarrassment, Patriarca was replaced as boss by Bianco, who maintained a very low profile. However, in 1991, Bianco was sentenced to 11 years in prison, while eight other family members were convicted of Racketeer Influenced and Corrupt Organizations Act (RICO) charges. Bianco died in prison in 1994.

Patriarca was sentenced to eight years in prison in 1992 after pleading guilty to racketeering charges. On January 6, 1992, all of the defendants in the RICO trial pleaded guilty and received lengthy sentences and large fines. In 1993, 26 others were convicted for running a bookmaking operation. "Cadillac" Frank Salemme took over the family after the trials and moved their base back to Boston. When Patriarca was released from prison, he avoided organized crime and went into retirement.

== Father and son ==
Raymond L. S. Patriarca's Rhode Island State Police I.D. photo

In 1986, Patriarca testified before the Judiciary Committee of the Rhode Island House of Representatives during the impeachment of Rhode Island Supreme Court Chief Justice Joseph A. Bevilacqua Sr., a former criminal defense lawyer accused of consorting with organized crime figures. The hearings led to Bevilacqua's resignation. During the hearing, FBI wiretaps were introduced of conversations with Patriarca Sr. that took place between 1962 and 1965. According to the FBI logs:

Ray tells Ray Jr. that, when he gets married, to marry an Italian girl, as she will stand by you when you're in trouble or won't call the police if you slap her in the mouth.

Patriarca Jr. defended his father before the press:

My father never, never, never told me about hitting women, Italian women, bothering women. I want to apologize to all the people in the state of Rhode Island because my father… never had a conversation with me like that about women, marrying an Italian girl so you can hit an Italian girl. He never spoke to me like that. In fact, my first wife was Jewish and my stepmother is Irish. My father respected all women.

American Mafia
| Preceded by Raymond L. S. Patriarca | Patriarca crime family Boss; 1984–1991 | Succeeded by Nicholas Bianco |
