= Gustin Gang =

1920s Irish-American criminal organization

The Gustin Gang was one of the earliest Irish-American gangs to emerge during the Prohibition era and dominate Boston's underworld during the 1920s. The name "Gustin Gang" came from a street in South Boston ("Southie"), which was off Old Colony Avenue, not from the name of any "members."

== History ==
Originally formed by Frank Wallace with his brother Steve during the mid-1910s, the gang first came to prominence in Southie as the "Tailboard Thieves," often looting and hijacking delivery trucks while stopped at intersections. Although largely organized by Frank, the gang was enforced by ex Olympic boxer Stevie Wallace. They were later joined by younger brother Jim. The brothers committed hijackings and armed robbery throughout the rest of the decade.

During the 1920s, Frank Wallace and his brothers would frequently be arrested on charges including larceny, trespassing, gaming, assault and battery, and breaking and entering. However, due to their local political influence (one of their attorneys was John W. McCormack, who was then a state senator, and later Speaker of the United States House of Representatives), they were rarely convicted and spent relatively little time in prison. Frank is reported to have been arrested more than 25 times, but only served time twice, at Deer Island House of Correction in 1919 and 1928. Steve served two years at Deer Island in 1934 for conspiring to kill a police officer. (Sweeney, Emily, 2012). Compared to other bootleggers such as Dan Carroll, the Gustins held fewer resources upon their entry into bootlegging. They eventually owned a few boats (known as rumrunners) that they ran into international waters to pick up alcohol, and then landed the shipments at various points around the Southie shore. They often delivered it themselves to customers, possibly including older brother Billy Wallace's speakeasy, at 232 Old Colony Ave. known as The Sportlight (later, Kelley's Cork N Bull and later Stadium, it is now the site of housing).

Eventually, they turned to hijacking. Using false badges similar to those used by Prohibition agents, they easily confiscated alcohol shipments from rival bootleggers which they themselves later sold off.

On 22 December 1931, after several trucks had been hijacked by members of the Gustins, Frank Wallace and his lieutenant Bernard "Dodo" Walsh were killed in an ambush, after agreeing to a sit-down with Italian-American gangsters, Joe Lombardo (Lombardi) of the North End, at the C.K. Importing Company, 317 Hanover St. Although the gang retained its power within the city under Stephen Wallace, infighting between the various factions of Irish gangs would eventually see the Italian-American gangsters establish themselves as a dominant criminal organization.
