= William Grasso =

American mobster (1927–1989)

- Born: William P. Grasso; January 6, 1927; East Haven, Connecticut, U.S.
- Died: June 13, 1989 (aged 62); Wethersfield, Connecticut, U.S.
- Cause of death: Gunshot to neck
- Other names: "Billy"; "Mickey"; "The Wild Guy"
- Occupation: Mobster
- Allegiance: Patriarca crime family

William P. Grasso (January 6, 1927 – June 13, 1989), known as "the Wild Guy", was an American mobster from East Haven, Connecticut who rose to the position of underboss in the Patriarca crime family of New England.

== Early life ==
Grasso was born in New Haven, Connecticut on January 6, 1927, the youngest of six children of Mariano Grasso, an Italian immigrant from Naples who ran a bakery and a pizzeria, and his American-born wife Clorindo, a housewife. Grasso was raised in the Fair Haven neighborhood of New Haven and dropped out of school in the ninth grade. He joined the U.S. Army in 1945, at the age of 18, and was honorably discharged in 1947. Grasso later became a truck driver for a fuel oil company.

== Criminal career ==
Grasso was first arrested in July 1951, for petty assault, when he and five others were apprehended after taking part in a "near riot" in Fair Haven during which several police officers were injured. He became a protégé and right-hand man of New Haven Colombo crime family and Murder Inc mobster Ralph "Whitey" Tropiano. Grasso was an intelligent and disciplined gangster who maintained a cover job with a New Haven appliance and television store and led a quiet and conventional home life, marrying and fathering a son. Although he developed a reputation as a ruthless, efficient and vicious hoodlum, the 5' 8" and 180 pounds Grasso was not as adept as a street fighter and would typically lose any fist fight he was involved in. In 1960, he and Tropiano were forced to abandon a restaurant on Wooster Street as their headquarters after Grasso was beaten there by a rival gangster.

In 1968, Grasso was indicted on charges that he used violence to take control of commercial refuse collection in Milford. Grasso, Tropiano and Lawrence R. Pellegrino were convicted and each sentenced to 8 to 12 years in federal prison and fined between $5,000 and $10,000. At Atlanta Federal Penitentiary, Grasso became an acquaintance of Raymond "il padrone" Patriarca, the longtime boss of the Providence, Rhode Island-based Patriarca crime family. After his release from prison in 1973, the Patriarca family recruited Grasso in order to expand its rackets into New Haven. After his release from prison, Grasso negotiated a deal with the Genovese crime family that gave him exclusive control over Hartford, which until then had been considered an "open" city not subject to the control of any single crime family.

Succeeding his father Raymond L.S. Patriarca as boss after his father's death in 1984, Raymond junior was considered a weak leader. He managed to keep the peace in his crime family due to the support of the Gambino crime family of New York. In 1987 when Junior's original underboss Ilario "Larry Baione" Maria Antonio Zannino was sentenced to thirty years in prison weakening Junior's position, with Zannino incarcerated, Grasso became official underboss.

Law enforcement officials believed that Grasso who was known for his ruthlessness was actually in charge, but these rumors ended when Grasso was killed on June 13, 1989. His body washed up ashore at the Wethersfield, Connecticut cove in the Connecticut River with a single gunshot wound to the back of his neck. Three previous attempts had already been made on his life.

With the death of Grasso, Raymond Patriarca, Jr.'s position as boss was further weakened and in 1990, was superseded by Nicholas Bianco, the acting underboss after Grasso's death. In 1991, Bianco was one of the defendants tried for the murder of Grasso.

Gaetano Milano of East Longmeadow, Massachusetts, a suburb of Springfield, was charged with the murder of Grasso. "Wild Guy" reportedly was murdered as the two were traveling on Interstate 91 to what Grasso believed was a meeting with Carlo Mastrototaro, a Worcester gangster, to settle a dispute about vending machine territories in Springfield. Springfield was a fiefdom of the Genovese crime family, operating with Patriarca family approval.

Milano and his confederates Frank Colantoni Jr. and brothers Frank Pugliano and Louis Pugliano were convicted of conspiracy to commit racketeering. Milano was also convicted of murder. During his trial, it was found out he had recently been made a member of the Mafia.

He admitted to the murder, claiming it was part of a power struggle between the various factions of the Patriarca family and that it was a case of "kill or be killed" – that if he didn't kill Grasso, "Wild Guy" would have killed him. He was sentenced to 33 years, which was reduced by seven years after appeals during which his attorney argued that Federal Bureau of Investigation informants, including FBI "Top Echelon" informant Angelo Mercurio, and corrupt investigators had stirred up trouble among New England gangsters, including Milano and Grasso. In 2012, Milano entered a pre-release program as he had been rehabilitated.

Louis Pugliano, who had received a life sentence was released in 2006 after serving 15 years. His lawyers secured a resentencing agreement with prosecutors who admitted that Pugliano received ineffective counsel and was hurt by a flawed jury selection process.
