= Nicholas Bianco =

American mobster (1932–1994)

- Mugshot of Nicholas Bianco
- Born: March 21, 1932; Providence, Rhode Island, U.S.
- Died: November 14, 1994 (aged 62); Springfield, Missouri, U.S.
- Other name: Nicky
- Criminal charges: 2 counts of racketeering
- Penalty: 11 and a half years imprisonment

Nicholas "Nicky" Bianco (March 21, 1932 – November 14, 1994) was an American mobster who became an influential member of the Patriarca crime family of New England.

== Biography ==
Bianco was born and raised in Providence, Rhode Island. In later years, he lived with his wife and children in Barrington, Rhode Island. He sent his children to private schools and one of his sons later became a lawyer.

As a young man, Bianco moved to Brooklyn, New York to work for the Colombo crime family. In the early 1960s, the Colombo family was being torn apart by an internal war between boss Joseph Magliocco and soldier Joe Gallo. In 1963, Bianco asked Patriarca boss Raymond L.S. Patriarca if Patriarca could serve as mediator between the two factions. Patriarca agreed and also inducted Bianco, then just a Colombo associate, as a made man in the Patriarca family. Bianco continued to serve as a liaison to the Colombos.

In 1982, Bianco allegedly participated in the murder of Anthony Mirabella. A Patriarca associate, Mirabella had incurred disfavor with the family because he was hard to control. Mirabella was shot to death in a Providence restaurant.

In July 1984, the Patriarca family entered a period of instability with the death of boss Raymond L.S. Patriarca. After a period of jockeying, his son Raymond Patriarca, Jr. became the new official boss. However, the younger Patriarca was not a strong boss; the family would be controlled over the next few years by a succession of powerful underbosses, including William "Wild Guy" Grasso. It also signaled a growing rivalry between the Patriarca mobsters in Boston, Massachusetts, and the family leadership in Providence, as well as friction with mobsters in Springfield and Worcester.

In 1985, Bianco was indicted on charges of conspiracy and aiding and abetting in the 1982 Mirabella murder. However, soon after the trial began, the judge dismissed all charges against Bianco due to lack of evidence.

== Boss ==
On 16 June 1989, underboss "Wild Guy" Grasso was murdered by members of the Springfield faction during a power struggle between Providence and Boston, which wanted more control over the family. The death of Grasso undermined Raymond Patriarca, Junior and Bianco essentially took control of the Providence-based family operations. Junior would be tried in 1991 for the murderer of Grasso. By 1990, Bianco would be de facto boss of the family, superseding Junior.

In 1989, Junior attended a Patriarca ceremony in a Massachusetts house in which four mob associates were admitted to the family. Unknown to the participants, the Federal Bureau of Investigation (FBI) had placed electronic surveillance devices in the room. Junior's presence at this ceremony served as evidence that he was a member of the family in an upcoming indictment.

In March 1990, Bianco and other top Patriarca family members were indicted on charges of conspiracy to murder, loan sharking, illegal gambling, wire fraud and interstate travel in aid of racketeering. With the aid of government witness John Castagna, Bianco was convicted on August 8, 1991, of two counts of racketeering in Hartford, Connecticut. On November 25, 1991, Bianco was sentenced to 11 and half years in federal prison.

On November 16, 1994, Nicholas Bianco died of amyotrophic lateral sclerosis (ALS) at the Federal Medical Center (FMC) in Springfield, Missouri.

American Mafia
Preceded by Raymond Patriarca, Jr.	Patriarca crime family Boss; 1991	Succeeded by Frank Salemme
