= Frank Wallace (gangster) =

American mobster (1902–1931)

Frank Wallace (February 19, 1902 – December 22, 1931) was an Irish-American gangster from South Boston, who ran the Gustin Gang in Boston during the Prohibition in the United States.

Wallace was the last Irishman to run the illegal rackets in Boston until, in 1931, agreeing to a "sit-down" with Italian mobsters Joseph Lombardi and Phillip Buccola to resolve the recent hijacking of beer shipments by the Gustins, he and lieutenant Bernard "Dodo" Walsh were ambushed and killed as they entered their rivals' headquarters at the C.K. Importing Company located at 317 Hanover St. in Boston's North End, on December 22, 1931.

After this, the Italians were in control until the 1950s, when the Irish gangsters James "Buddy" McLean, Bernard "Bernie" McLaughlin, and the other Irish gang leaders broke away and took over the rackets. For the next 30 years, the Winter Hill Gang would be the top gang of the area.
