= Matthew Guglielmetti =

American mobster

Matthew Louis Guglielmetti Jr., also known as "Matty" (born 1948), is the underboss or sottocapo of the New England-based Patriarca crime family of La Cosa Nostra. Guglielmetti is closely aligned with former family boss Luigi Mannochio.

== Criminal career ==
Guglielmetti is a second-generation gangster who began his documented criminal career in 1984, when he and his father, Matthew L. Guglielmetti Sr. were arrested for hijacking a truckload of Canadian whisky. However, the case was later dropped. In 1989, while the Patriarca family was in the midst of an internal factional war, Guglielmetti came to the attention of law enforcement authorities when it was discovered that he had attempted to act as a peace broker. In return for his efforts, he inherited the rackets previously overseen by the murdered underboss William Grasso. On October 20, 1989, Guglielmetti was recorded by the Federal Bureau of Investigation (FBI) while the Patriarca family conducted a Mafia induction ceremony in Medford, Massachusetts. As a result, Guglielmetti ended up doing nearly five years at Federal Correctional Institution, Sandstone in Sandstone, Minnesota during the 1990s after pleading guilty to federal racketeering charges in Hartford, Connecticut. After his release, he resumed his criminal activities and soon presided over gambling and loan sharking for the Patriarca family.

== FBI sting of Local 271 and Capital City Concrete ==
In April 2002, the FBI launched a probe into the Rhode Island construction industry. As part of the investigation, they created a fake company called Hemphill Construction in Johnston, Rhode Island. At the time, Guglielmetti served as steward for Laborers' International Union of North America (LIUNA) Local 271. After Hemphill opened, an undercover FBI agent met with Guglielmetti and offered him the chance to buy into the company. According to an FBI affidavit, Guglielmetti became a silent partner in Hemphill and started taking company funds, "including a share of the profits from laundering what Guglielmetti believed were drug proceeds through the undercover business."

In 2003, Guglielmetti was appointed by the Laborers Union to serve as union steward for Capital City Concrete, a union Women Owned Business (WBE/DBE). H.V. Collins was the successful low bidder on the Kent County Courthouse Parking Garage project. Capital City Concrete was the part of H.V. Collins' Minority Business Enterprise (MBE) plan. In accordance with the MBE plan, the General Contractor - H.V. Collins in this case - is challenged to meet certain goals in hiring Minority and/or Women Businesses to participate in the work. The MBE plan is a requirement on all publicly funded projects. Capital City Concrete was the subcontractor for concrete formwork and flatwork as part of this new $5.8 million parking garage at the Kent County Court House in Warwick, Rhode Island. Only after the award of the contracts and as work progressed, state court officials pressed the subcontractors already on site to furnish BCI reports for all of their respective employees. None of this was part of the original Bid Solicitation process nor was it part of any contractual agreements. In its legal rights and as instructed by its counsel, Capital City Concrete was among the last subcontractors to comply with this request. Nothing emerged in the state files - apparently, Guglielmetti had unspecified charges expunged.

In October 2003, Rhode Island and Massachusetts police visited the Warwick construction site to tell Guglielmetti that he and Manocchio had been recorded on undercover wiretaps discussing the collection of gambling debts and the mediation of a mob dispute. On January 20, 2005, FBI agents and Rhode Island State Police detectives raided the headquarters of the RI Laborers Union - Local 271 and multiple other Contractors including Capital City Concrete in Cranston. Earlier that day, Guglielmetti and a pair of associates were arrested in Johnston on unrelated drug charges.

On March 31, 2005, Matthew Guglielmetti signed a plea agreement admitting that he conspired to distribute more than five kilograms of cocaine. Later in 2005, Guglielmetti was sentenced to 11 years in prison.

In May 2005, FBI officials went to the home of the Owner of Capital City Concrete and informed her that there were no charges against her and/or her company. Further, they expressed that Capital City Concrete was, in fact, found innocent of any and all allegations that were made public. Both agents expressed their sincere apologies for the unfortunate events that Capital City Concrete was wrongfully accused of and publicly humiliated by. Unfortunately, the FBI was not able to make a public statement as such because the investigation was ongoing.

== Release ==
On June 10, 2014 Guglielmetti was released from Fort Dix Federal Prison.

== See also ==
- Patriarca crime family
