= James O'Toole (mobster) =

American mobster (1929–1973)

- O'Toole's November 1, 1965 mugshot
- Born: December 7, 1929; Boston, Massachusetts, U.S.
- Died: December 1, 1973 (aged 43); South Boston, Boston, Massachusetts, U.S.
- Other names: Spike, Jimmy, Red
- Children: 6
- Accomplice: Dorothy "Dottie" Barchard

James "Spike" O'Toole (December 7, 1929 – December 1, 1973) was an Irish-American criminal from Dorchester, Massachusetts.

== Early life ==
James "Jimmy" O'Toole was born in Dorchester, Boston to first generation Irish immigrants from County Cork, Ireland. He was a close friend of the leader of the Winter Hill Gang of Somerville, Massachusetts, James "Buddy" McLean. He was targeted for assassination by the McLaughlin Brothers gang (the Charlestown Mob) of Charlestown, when a Cambridge Winter Hill Gang founding member and bank robber named Ronald P. Dermody fell in love with his twenty-nine-year-old German-English girlfriend-mistress Dorothy Barchard. Dorothy was also the stepmother of Joseph Dermody, the son of Joseph from a previous marriage. O'Toole was also referred to as "Red" because of his thick head of red hair that he fashioned with Brylcreem into a ducktail. Although James was his baptismal name he was called "Spike" by his friends. He was a close friend of Charlestown Mob member Francis X. Murray, Harold Hannon and Wilfred J. Delaney who would later be murdered by rival gang members.

== The love triangle ==
Mrs. Dorothy "Dottie" Barchard is described by Howie Carr as having been "the premier moll of the Boston underworld in the 1950s and 1960s". At the time of her relationship with O'Toole she was still married to Richard Barchard, a little-known charter member of the Winter Hill Gang. Barchard was locked up at Alcatraz for his part in robbing a bank in Hammond, Indiana, with Whitey Bulger in November 1955.

O'Toole and Dorothy lived together from January 1960 to February 1965. During that time, he fathered two daughters with Dorothy. In January 1965, Dorothy brought a suit against O'Toole for non-support of their two toddler daughters. It was not her own idea. She had applied for aid from the State, but officials had insisted that she name the father of her children. Otherwise, they said, she would not be eligible for assistance. Spike was arraigned on a morals charge for having two children out of wedlock with Dorothy.

Dorothy Barchard was also involved with Joseph Barboza and criminal lawyer John E. Fitzgerald Jr. during this same period. Fitzgerald was later maimed by a car bomb while driving Barboza's car. Fitzgerald later told the FBI that his wife received a telephone call, in which the caller indicated that if Dorothy did not stop associating "with that guy" (O'Toole), that she and her children could be murdered.

John E. Fitzgerald advised the FBI that, in addition, his wife received a telephone call in which the caller told his wife about the relationship between him and Dorothy. Fitzgerald was asked who made this statement to him, and the caller said, "I am not going to divulge the identity of this person, but I have given the identity of this party to Jimmy O'Toole, and he will probably be in trouble when he gets out of jail." Fitzgerald also said that when he investigated to see who made the incriminating telephone calls to his wife and to Dorothy Barchard, the Patriarca crime family tried to lead him to believe that it was O'Toole's friends; that he checked with O'Toole, and this was not so.

After surviving the car bomb attack in Everett, Massachusetts in 1968, Fitzgerald left South Boston and moved to South Dakota, where he worked with the Small Business Administration and was later appointed judgeship. Frank Salemme was later convicted and sentenced to seventeen years for his involvement in the mistaken identity car-bombing. Co-conspirator Stephen Flemmi was also named in the indictment but after being arrested in 1975, the charges against him were dropped.

== Murder attempt on Edward (Wimpy) Bennett ==
James and another associate, allegedly Francis X. Murray, tried to shoot Edward Bennett, the criminal mentor of future criminal brothers Stephen Flemmi and Vincent Flemmi. Edward had stepped out the front door of his home and O'Toole shot at him from where he hid in the bushes nearby. Edward quickly drew his revolver and returned fire and fled from the home. O'Toole's accomplice and getaway driver thought to be Murray who waited nearby with the car idling across the street panicked and deserted his friend after realizing that Bennett had not been murdered, and that O'Toole and he were returning fire. Afterward the reasoning behind the failed ambush was that George and Edward McLaughlin had surmised that Bennett had caused among other problems with their criminal activities, assisted in setting up the failed murder attempt of Edward McLaughlin.

== Attempted murder of Vincent Flemmi ==
On the evening of May 10, 1965, Patriarca crime family member Vincent Flemmi left his home at 10:30 p.m. to meet with his friend and criminal associate, Joseph Barboza. As he approached his Oldsmobile Cutlass, two gunmen stepped out of the bushes shooting at him, one of the gunmen shot and wounded him with a twelve-gauge sawed-off shotgun. While recovering in the hospital from his near fatal gunshot wound, Flemmi informed his FBI handler H. Paul Rico that when he was shot, the momentum of the gun blast spun him around and that he saw his bungled killers fleeing the scene, although he was not able to positively identify them. The alleged shooter was thought to be O'Toole.

== Mob attempts against his life and murder ==
He had been receiving death threats since 1963. In December 1964 Spike and Francis X. Murray received telegrams the day before they were set to be released saying, "You will receive the same benefits of Harold." The anonymous telegram sender was referring to mob associate Harold Hannon, a 54-year-old criminal associate whose bound body was found floating in the Boston Harbor the previous August along with Wilfred J. Delaney. In September 1964 after Spike and Francis were released, there was an attempted shooting of Murray as he drove along the Southeast Expressway in South Boston. The shooter was never identified and his intended death sentence was never carried out unlike his friend O'Toole. James would later be arrested for another crime and served time in Massachusetts Correctional Institution - Cedar Junction as an accessory after the fact in the murder of Dorchester bank clerk, William Sheridan. Sheridan was allegedly shot to death by George McLaughlin, though nobody could ever definitively say why, in March 1964. O'Toole had harbored McLaughlin in an apartment in the Mattapan section of Dorchester while George was on the FBI's Top Ten Most Wanted List.

In December 1973, O'Toole (who had survived many assassination attempts) was run over and killed by gangland assassin John Martorano while leaving Edward G. Connors' saloon in Savin Hill, Dorchester.

== Potential confrontation with Rockball O'Rourke ==
O'Toole and 46-year-old Joseph M. (Rockball) O'Rourke from Medford, Massachusetts were arraigned on charges in 1970 and imprisoned at the same jail while awaiting trial. O'Rourke, a powerful and loyal associate of the Charlestown Mob, was being held for his involvement in the shooting of Boston patrolman Robert Noonan. Detective John P. Flaherty of the Fields Corner Division stated that Officer Noonan's family was afraid of potential uprising from members of the Charlestown Mob and that a police detail he placed around his bed at Boston City Hospital while he recuperated from his gunshot wound. O'Rourke allegedly shot Noonan after he tried to break up a bar brawl. O'Toole was remanded to the Charles Street Jail and prison authorities later had O'Rourke sent to the Billerica House by Judge Reuben L. Lurie on advice from the Assistant District Attorney John Mahoney. He and prison officials were worried of a possible outbreak of violence in the streets of Boston and in the prison itself among its incarcerated Charlestown Mob and Winter Hill Gang associates. The city had just overcome a brutal violent gang war and did not want another one.

== Repercussion of his murder ==
After O'Toole was murdered, former associate Mullen Gang member Paul McGonagle was set for assassination by James J. Bulger. Bulger took part in McGonagle's murder with the help of Thomas King and buried him on Tenean Beach in Dorchester, Boston. Bulger drove McGongale's car off a pier in Charlestown, Massachusetts and tossed his wallet into the water. This was to give the impression of what had happened but no definite solid answers. McGonagle's friends were also persuaded that Paul had been murdered by rival mob associates in Charlestown and take a misguided revenge against the McLaughlin Brothers gang, therefore eliminating more of the Winter Hill Gang's rivals.
