= Joe McDonald (mobster) =

American mobster (1917–1997)

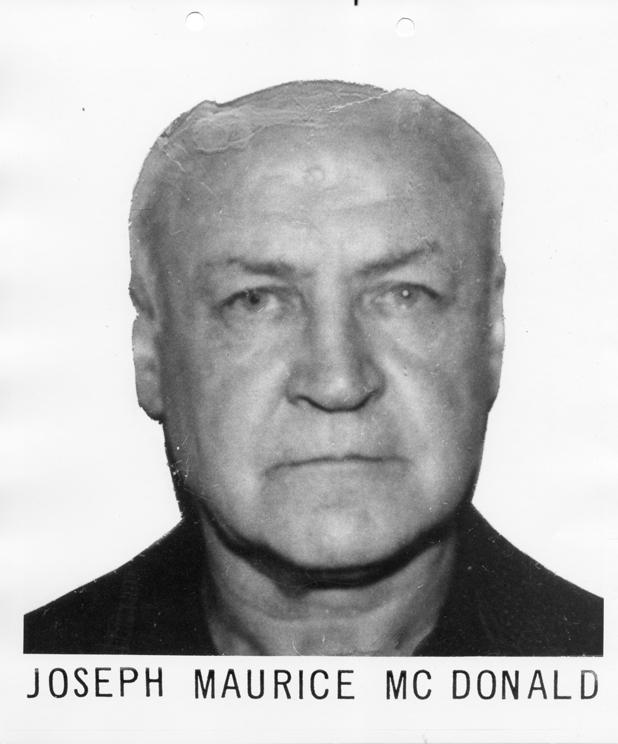

FBI Ten Most Wanted Fugitive
- Charges: Armed robbery
- Alias: "Joe Mac"

Description
- Born: Joseph Maurice McDonald; July 14, 1917; Somerville, Massachusetts, U.S.
- Died: August 6, 1997 (aged 80); Somerville, Massachusetts, U.S.
- Occupation: Mobster

Status
- Added: April 1, 1976
- Caught: September 15, 1982
- Number: 339
- Captured

Joseph Maurice McDonald (July 14, 1917 – August 6, 1997), known as "Joe Mac", was an American mobster and a charter member of the Winter Hill Gang of Somerville, Massachusetts, a northwestern suburb of Boston.

== Early life ==
McDonald was born in the Boston suburb of Somerville, Massachusetts, and was of Scottish and Irish descent. His older brother, Leo, was also a criminal. In 1938, McDonald won the Golden Gloves Novice Championship at Boston Arena. He served in the U.S. Navy during World War II. McDonald was aboard the USS Quincy when it was torpedoed by the Japanese during the Battle of Savo Island in August 1942. Although he survived, his younger brother was killed in the attack.

== Winter Hill Gang ==
McDonald was the primary figure responsible for organizing criminal rackets in the working-class city of Somerville during the 1950s. Along with James "Buddy" McLean and Howard "Howie" Winter, McDonald was a founding member of the Winter Hill Gang, an Irish mob group which emerged in the Winter Hill neighborhood of Somerville in the early 1960s. His closest criminal associate was James "Jimmy" Sims. McDonald was a bookmaker, loan shark, thief and "hit man" for the Winter Hill Gang whose preferred modus operandi involved shooting victims at close range with a handgun. He allegedly committed as many as 30 murders, but was never indicted or convicted.

On January 17, 1960, the brothers Joe and Leo McDonald, along with another gunman, stole $8,600 in cash and $4,600 in checks after holding seven people hostage during a robbery at Sunnyhurst Dairy in Stoneham. The brothers were each arrested by the Massachusetts State Police on January 20, 1960, Leo at his home in Somerville, and Joe at his Malden residence. Joe McDonald was sentenced to 12-to-18 years in prison for the robbery, but escaped from custody in 1963 and spent three years as a fugitive, during which time he threatened the police officers who had headed the investigation into the armed robbery and a witness who had testified against him.

When McDonald returned to Somerville, the Greater Boston area was in the midst of a period of gang warfare which resulted in the deaths of dozens of mostly Irish, Jewish and Italian hoodlums. The Winter Hill Gang was at war with the McLaughlin Gang of Charlestown. On November 23, 1964, McDonald was reportedly involved in an ambush on Charlestown gang leader Edward "Punchy" McLaughlin, blowing off half of McLaughlin's jaw with a shotgun as he sat in a car outside the Beaconsfield Hotel in Brookline. McLaughlin survived after he was rushed to Beth Israel Hospital. The Winter Hill Gang emerged victorious in the gang war after two of the McLaughlin brothers, Bernie and "Punchy", were killed, and the other, Georgie, was sent to prison for life for murder, although the Somerville gang leader McLean was killed, leaving Winter in charge of the Winter Hill Gang. McDonald was returned to prison after he was arrested following a chase and shootout with police in the western Boston borough of Brighton in 1966.

On March 17, 1971, McDonald and Sims robbed the Confederate Philately in Boston's Back Bay while the owner, Jack E. Molesworth, was vacationing in Florida, stealing a collection of 400,000 stamps worth approximately $500,000. The gangsters used a network of coin and stamp dealers, including Raymond Lundgren, who owned Century Stamp & Coin Co in Los Angeles, to fence the stolen stamps.

On December 1, 1973, the Winter Hill Gang hunted down the last significant remaining member of the disbanded McLaughlin Gang, James "Spike" O'Toole. The gangsters opened fire on O'Toole from a car after he left the Bulldog Tavern in Savin Hill. As O'Toole hid behind a mailbox, McDonald shot him in the head and quipped: "He won't bother us no more".

Sought by the Federal Bureau of Investigation (FBI) for the stamp robbery, McDonald disappeared in October 1975. As a fugitive, he fled first to Chelsea, then New York City, before going into hiding in South Florida. Joe McDonald was assisted by his brother, Leo, while on the run. Lundgren agreed to testify against McDonald and Sims after he was charged with conspiracy to distribute stolen stamps. On January 13, 1976, McDonald killed Lundgren, shooting him four times at point-blank range in front of his wife in the parking garage of the condominium complex where he lived in Sierra Madre, California. On April 1, 1976, McDonald became the 339th fugitive listed on FBI Ten Most Wanted Fugitives.

Patriarca crime family associate Richard Castucci provided the whereabouts of McDonald and Sims, who were hiding out in Greenwich Village together, to the FBI after becoming an informant. To prevent the capture of McDonald and Sims, three other Winter Hill gangsters—John "the Executioner" Martorano, James "Whitey" Bulger, and Stephen "the Rifleman" Flemmi—shot Castucci on December 29, 1976 and dumped his body in the trunk of his Cadillac automobile which was left to be discovered in Revere.

The Winter Hill Gang became involved in a lucrative horse race-fixing scheme in which the gangsters bribed and threatened jockeys and drugged horses in order to predetermine the outcomes of races. The scheme was uncovered during a two-year investigation by the FBI and the Justice Department Organized Crime Strike Force, and the mastermind behind the conspiracy, Anthony "Fat Tony" Ciulla, became a cooperating witness against the gang. On February 4, 1979, McDonald and twenty associates were indicted on federal charges of race-fixing. According to the indictment, McDonald suggested that a jockey who reneged on a bribe be killed and his body left in the backstretch at Suffolk Downs as warning to other jockeys. When Winter and other gang members were imprisoned, the FBI informants Bulger and Flemmi, who were "unindicted co-conspirators" in the case, took over the leadership of the Winter Hill Gang.

While a fugitive, McDonald was involved in two murders, in Oklahoma and Florida, with Martorano. McDonald and Martorano murdered businessman Roger Wheeler in Tulsa, Oklahoma.

Sims was captured in Key West, Florida in 1982. McDonald was eventually located by authorities after Bulger tipped off the FBI to his whereabouts. While transporting weapons to New York City for the Provisional Irish Republican Army (IRA), McDonald was arrested by local police upon his arrival at New York's Penn Station on September 15, 1982. He was found to be in possession of three semiautomatic firearms, three silencers, and a quantity of ammunition after his luggage was searched by U.S. Customs Service officers.

McDonald and Sims, the last of 21 defendants to be prosecuted in the race-fixing case, pleaded guilty to racketeering charges in January 1983 and were each sentenced by U.S. District Court Judge John J. McNaught to six years in prison on February 25, 1983. McDonald also received two concurrent terms, for operating a sports betting enterprise in Malden, and for possession of stolen rare coins in California. Federal weapons possession charges were dismissed after McDonald filed a motion requesting the names and addresses of informers whose information would be relied upon at trial. He was never convicted of the stamp heist.

After his release from federal prison in early 1987, McDonald visited Bulger and Flemmi at their liquor store in South Boston and demanded $4 million from the duo as his share of the Winter Hill Gang's rackets during his four years in prison. Due to McDonald's reputation as a veteran killer, Bulger and Flemmi acquiesced to his demands. McDonald subsequently went into semi-retirement, using his wealth to help run the Somerville Boxing Club.

McDonald's longtime partner-in-crime, Sims, fell into debt with the New York Mafia after being blacklisted by every bookmaker in Boston and went into hiding when he lost a large bet on Super Bowl XXVI. McDonald was ordered to kill Sims and lured him out of hiding with a classified ad placed in the Boston Herald in February 1992. Sims was allegedly shot by McDonald and buried in swampland off Fenno Street in Quincy.

== Death ==
McDonald died of a stroke on August 6, 1997, at the age of 80.
