= Timothy Connolly =

American businessman (born 1958)

- Born: Timothy A. Connolly III; May 27, 1958; Roxbury, Boston, Massachusetts, U.S.
- Died: July 21, 2020 (aged 62); Royal Palm Beach, Florida, U.S.
- Other names: "Timmy", "TC"
- Height: 6 ft 6 in (1.98 m)
- Allegiance: Winter Hill Gang

Timothy A. Connolly III (May 27, 1958 - July 21, 2020), aka "Timmy Connolly" and "TC", was an American former South Boston bar owner and mortgage broker, who wore a wire inside the infamous Winter Hill Gang and helped the federal government indict their two leaders, James "Whitey" Bulger and Stephen Flemmi ("The Rifleman"). The public was led to believe that Tim Connolly was merely a businessman and an innocent victim of one of Jim Bulger's many extortions. But in truth, Tim Connolly was secretly a "made member" of the Winter Hill gang and a high ranking lieutenant in this Bulger crime family.

== Early life ==
Connolly was born and raised in Roxbury, Massachusetts, the hometown of Stevie Flemmi. He was the youngest of three children. His father was Irish-American and his mother was Italian (Sicilian). Like Flemmi and several other members of the Winter Hill, Connolly grew up in the Orchard Park projects, one of the first low-income housing projects in Boston. At age 12, Connolly's family moved over the city line into a working class section of Milton, a wealthy suburb of Boston. At age 15, Tim Connolly befriended a high school classmate, Billy Hussey, Stevie Flemmi's biological son. Connolly met "Stevie" and their relationship grew from there. Flemmi would ultimately become Connolly's mentor and boss for the next three decades.

Connolly graduated from Milton High School in 1976, where he was captain of the basketball team, earning all star honors. He attended Bridgeton Academy, Maine for a post graduate year. In September 1977 Connolly entered Boston College on a partial basketball scholarship. He quit before the season started. Connolly graduated from BC in 1981.

== The Winter Hill Gang ==
The Winter Hill gang, aka "The Irish Mob", is an Irish American crime family (with Italian American associates) operating in the region of Boston, Massachusetts, dating back to the early 1960s. The Winter Hill gang was considered one of the most ruthless and violent white gangs in America. It operated for thirty years; running a portion of Boston's gambling rackets, drugs and did "brutal hits" for the Patriarca crime family (the New England Mafia), until its two leaders were indicted in January 1995.

Tim Connolly was an early protege of Stevie Flemmi, a known killer of Italian descent. Beginning as a teenager in the mid-1970s, Connolly went to work for Flemmi, collecting gambling receipts and moving marijuana. Over the next decade, Connolly worked his way up from the bottom to the top spot below Bulger and Flemmi. From 1984 through 1994, Connolly operated several legitimate and illegitimate businesses which fronted for the Irish mob. In addition, Connolly ran his own criminal crew, which offered protection, loan sharking, gambling and drug distribution. Connolly was a close associate of both Flemmi and Bulger, having been seen with them on hundreds of occasions by Drug Enforcement Administration and Federal Bureau of Investigation (FBI) agents performing surveillance. Connolly was one of only two lieutenants who met daily with Bulger and Flemmi. The other was Bulger's driver and bodyguard, Kevin Weeks.

Stevie Flemmi was arrested in Boston on January 5, 1995, one week prior to the release of a 37-count racketeering indictment against both him and Bulger. Flemmi has not been released from prison since. He is serving consecutive life sentences in a witness protection prison for his admitted participation in the murders of 10 people including two women. It is rumored that Flemmi committed over 50 murders himself and is responsible for the death of over 100 people, mostly career criminals.

Jim Bulger was tipped off by corrupt FBI agent John Connolly before the indictments came down and fled Boston. Since the Racketeer Influenced and Corrupt Organizations Act indictments, Jim Bulger has also been charged with twenty murders.

Tim Connolly was shot in Boston's Chinatown neighborhood in an apparent assassination attempt in November 1994. Two weeks later, entering the Federal Courthouse on crutches, he provided crucial testimony to a grand jury that resulted in the racketeering indictments against Bulger and Flemmi. Connolly entered the Witness Protection Program in December 1994 but is rumored to have been "kicked out" within two years. He is believed to be "banned from Boston" as part of his deal with the United States Department of Justice. He has not been seen in Boston in over a decade. Unlike Winter Hill Associates Kevin Weeks, John "Red" Shea, Eddie Mackenzie and Pat Nee, Connolly has turned down several book deals and offers to be interviewed. He is rumored to be completing his life inside the Irish mob.

== Who brought down Bulger and Flemmi? ==
After the 1995 indictments of Flemmi and Bulger, there was widespread speculation as to who was responsible for bringing down these mob bosses.

A front page Boston Globe article stated:

Timothy A. Connolly 3d, a one time proprietor of a South Boston bar frequented by ne'er-do-wells, emerged as a crucial witness against Bulger, accusing Bulger of menacing him with a knife while extorting money.

Apparently (Connolly) worked as an informant for the FBI for several years before joining Chico Krantz and other bookie, Jimmy Katz, in the Witness Protection Program. In a deal brokered by then-U.S. Attorney John Pappalardo in 1991, Timothy A. Connolly 3d, (who owned the Corner Cafe.) became an FBI informant when he could not make his alleged extortion payments to Kevin Weeks, a close Bulger associate.

Connolly, who worked for a Waltham mortgage company, was pushed into investigator's arms, according to interviews and court records, simply because he took too long to help a drug trafficker in South Boston pay off a $40,000 debt to Bulger.

Connolly was summoned to the back room of the Rotary Variety store in South Boston in July 1989. And it was there, according to a court affidavit, that Bulger threw caution to the wind and did his own dirty work, menacing Connolly by drawing a long knife from a sheath on his leg, punctuating a tirade by stabbing nearby boxes and waving the blade around Connolly's face. Connolly was purportedly "fined" $50,000 that was to be split between Bulger and Weeks. Two years later, Connolly went to the U.S. Attorney's office and is now a cooperating witness who is believed to have worn a body wire around town last year.

For all intents and purposes, Whitey Bulger was untouchable until an incident that allegedly occurred one night in 1989. Late in the evening, Whitey allegedly arrived at his "office" behind the liquor store, to take care of some unfinished business. Reportedly, Whitey's associate, Stephen "The Rifleman" Flemmi, stood waiting inside. Their guest of honor was a local tavern owner named Tim Connolly, whom Whitey had allegedly targeted for extortion. Two days later, after Whitey had allegedly threatened Tim Connolly, Tim did the only thing he felt he could do. He returned to the liquor store with $25,000 cash. But Connolly also did something else. He went to the FBI. They, in turn, began building a case against the so-called "Don of South Boston." Connolly provided authorities with the evidence needed to build up a federal racketeering case against Bulger.

Timothy Connolly... had a simple story of extortion to tell about Bulger putting a knife to his throat for money. But the U.S. Attorney's Office tried to turn Tim Connolly's solid single into a home run. They constructed an elaborate plan to infiltrate Bulger's financial operation... U.S. Attorney A. John Pappalardo decided to use Tim Connolly to get into Bulger's finances. He turned Tim Connolly over to two handpicked FBI agents who had no ties to John Connolly. They wired the mortgage broker as a way to get an inside look at Bulger's money laundering.'"

In 1997, it was publicly revealed that Jim Bulger and Stevie Flemmi were secret, Top Echelon FBI informants, ratting on the New England Mafia, while conducting murder and mayhem under the FBI's nose.

The ensuing FBI scandal, involving Bulger and Flemmi, has been called "one of the greatest failures in the history of federal law enforcement" and quite possibly "the biggest scandal in FBI history."

"Memos show that for more than twenty years, FBI headquarters in Washington D.C. knew that Boston agents were using hit men and mob leaders as informants and shielding them from prosecution for serious crimes, including murder."

As a result of this huge scandal, Tim Connolly was mostly forgotten on purpose. No one at the Department of Justice wanted to talk publicly about Bulger and Flemmi. Many of the Boston FBI agents involved in the Bulger and Flemmi case retired. Federal agents were forbidden to talk publicly about the case because of liability and potential obstruction of justice. But in 2003, the federal government quietly confirmed what had been rumored. Ex-FBI Special Agent (retired), John Gamel, Connolly's FBI handler and Supervisor of Organized Crime, appeared in front of a Congressional subcommittee and stated for the record:

... the case against (James "Whitey" Bulger) started in July 1990, when Tim Connolly was referred to the FBI by Tom Reilly, a private attorney. Connolly was a mortgage broker who prepared fraudulent mortgage schemes for associates of James "Whitey" Bulger. Connolly informed the FBI that James "Whitey" Bulger had personally extorted $50,000 from him and that he had been "shook down" in the backroom of a liquor store with a knife to his chest.

== Criminal career ==
In June 1976, Connolly joined up with Stevie Flemmi's "other gang", nicknamed "the Rox" for their hometown. He drove bales of marijuana in a U-Haul truck from south Florida to Boston under the guise of being a college student moving home. Connolly continued this practice throughout college, earning as much as $10,000 per load at the end, when they started adding cocaine to the mix. His criminal career as a drug trafficker was off and running. During college he ran a sports card gambling operation at ten colleges for Flemmi. He distributed "gaming cards" and collected cash from his dealers. By 1978 he was working as a bouncer at Flemmi's nightclubs. Then he started collecting debts for Flemmi's loan sharking business. A part-time job at a South Boston jewelry store put him in touch with Flemmi's partner, Jim Bulger, beginning in 1978.

Connolly was officially "made" into the Winter Hill gang in 1984. With Flemmi's backing, he purchased a South Boston bar called the Broadway Casino and renamed it Connolly's Corner Cafe. The 3C's, as it was known in Southie, would quickly become a Winter Hill gangster front and hangout, a place from which the Irish mob ran bookmaking, loan sharking and eventually cocaine. In 1985, Connolly bought into New Boston Mortgage, a legitimate Boston area mortgage broker. Here, he developed his expertise in creating fraudulent real estate loans for Winter Hill associates. From 1985 to 1994, Connolly ran a real estate rehabilitation business with Frankie "The Flame" Fraine, a renowned arsonist, insurance scam artist and Winter Hill associate. Together they used Bulger and Flemmi's contacts to renovate condemned properties and launder cash for the mob. According to DEA sources, Connolly was believed to have been "the bank", the financing arm for the South Boston cocaine ring, lending cash to associates who actually bought and distributed the drugs. This kept Bulger and Flemmi at a safe distance from the actual drug dealing activity but not far from the profits. Connolly laundered millions of dollars in drug and gambling proceeds through a variety of real estate and off-shore banking schemes. He was a millionaire before age 30.

A May 2001 Boston Globe exposé on "Mobster Chronicles" referenced Tim Connolly as the real deal, a true gangster, unlike "Eddie Mackenzie, a wannabe gangster who was never part of Bulger's inner circle."

Globe writers Shelley Murphy and Judy Rakowsky state "Timothy Connolly, a former associate of Bulger and Stephen "The Rifleman" Flemmi, said "I was down in the dirt with these guys. I know."

=== Appearance ===
Tim Connolly is a former basketball player, standing six foot six, with broad shoulders and a barrel chest. He has reddish blond, fine hair and a classic Italian nose.

== History of violence ==
Connolly's business acumen was well known to people in South Boston, many of whom referred to him as "one of South Boston's new millionaires." Yet, Connolly's brutal, violent side made him a perfect fit for the ruthless Irish mob. He had a reputation for having a "hair trigger" and pulling a gun without hesitation. He was well known for bare knuckles bar room brawling and gun violence. Much of his criminal record has been expunged but Connolly reputedly had over twenty "assault and battery" arrests.

Connolly was the subject of Massachusetts State Police, Boston Police and DEA investigations dating back to 1977. His rap sheet lists a number of violent offenses ranging from Assault, Assault and Battery, Assault and Battery with a Dangerous Weapon including Pistol Whipping, Attempted Murder, Threatening a Witness and Extortion. In addition, he was charged with dozens of lesser offenses ranging from To Wit the Sped of Beasts (Running a Gambling Operation), Selling Stolen Merchandise and Drug Dealing. In almost all cases, the charges were dropped or dismissed without a finding. Connolly was a suspect in over twenty homicides in the Boston area but has never been officially charged with murder.

Connolly was considered a serious threat both inside and outside the Irish mob because of his large following, his contacts within the La Cosa Nostra (LCN) and his ability to pull people together from other gangs to form his own gang. Connolly is half Italian on his mother's side and has strong Sicilian roots. He has several cousins and relatives who were made men in La Cosa Nostra. One cousin was a highly respected LCN "banker" who wielded considerable power and influence throughout Boston. This "cousin" mentored Tim in real estate and other business. As a result, Connolly was known to have frequent contact with Frank Salemme.

In 1990, a 45-person Organized Crime Task Force was initiated by the DEA, Massachusetts State Police, FBI, Internal Revenue Service, Boston Police and U.S. Customs, with the goal of putting Connolly in jail. It was believed that his business operations were "the straw that linked all of Bulger and Flemmi's activities with the LCN." (La Cosa Nostra) As a result, Connolly was under 24-hour surveillance and the subject of numerous federal wiretaps.

An August 19, 1990 front-page article from the Boston Herald titled "Feds taped alleged coke boss" referenced a phone conversation between John "Red" Shea and Tim Connolly, which was recorded by the DEA. The Herald article suggested that "Red" Shea was South Boston's coke boss but Connolly was much higher up in the Winter Hill than Shea or any other drug dealers. The taped conversation was about a questionable real estate loan which Connolly secured for South Boston drug dealer, Thomas Cahill, who was part of the South Boston narcotics distribution network.

John "Red" Shea was among 51 people charged in four separate indictments last week with working for four cocaine rings that allegedly smuggled the drug in from Florida and sold it on the city streets. In an August 30, 1989 (phone) conversation, Timothy Connolly complained to Shea that Rooney called Monarch Mortgage-which wrote (Thomas) Cahill's loan and told them his property was "overfinanced by 130 percent." Rooney told the company "It was a bogus deal and a bogus appraisal" claimed Connolly, owner of Connolly's Corner Cafe in South Boston. "He ratted on me and Tom (Cahill)."

Shea offered to "go down right now and tell him to shut his (expletive) mouth or I'll shut it permanently." Connolly said "that would be the nicest thing to do."

Red Shea was found guilty of cocaine dealing and served 12 years in prison. He was released in 2002.

== Top-echelon FBI informant ==
Coincident with the South Boston cocaine indictments and the Boston Herald article, Tim Connolly received reliable information that he was being "set up by Bulger and Flemmi" with the DEA. As a result, Connolly sought legal advice and counsel from private attorney Thomas Reilly. Reilly was working in private practice while running his campaign for Middlesex County District Attorney. Later, as Middlesex DA, Reilly would aggressively prosecute both Bulger and Flemmi from 1991 to 1994. It was Reilly who developed the legal strategy against Bulger and Flemmi that used bookmakers to help make the case under the Racketeer Influenced and Corrupt Organizations Act. Tom Reilly would eventually be elected Massachusetts Attorney General and served from 1999 to 2007.

After hearing Connolly's story, Reilly put him together with the U.S. Attorney for Massachusetts, A. John Pappalardo. After some legal wrangling and a grant of immunity, Connolly agreed to become a top-echelon informant on Bulger and Flemmi. His top-secret operation was dubbed "Close Shave" or "Clean Shave" by his FBI handlers. They figured that Bulger would slit Connolly's throat if he ever found out he was wearing a wire and recording conversations. Connolly reportedly wore a wire for four years, gathering evidence, while the government's case was slowed by ex-FBI agent John Connolly and corruption within the Boston FBI office.

== The "Other Connolly" ==
Tim Connolly is not to be confused with corrupt ex-FBI Special Agent John Connolly, who shares the same spelling of their last name. John Connolly is accused of accepting $235,000 in cash and gifts from Bulger and Flemmi during the 1980s in return for providing them with tips and information on ongoing police and federal investigations. In addition, ex-Agent Connolly reputedly "fingered" Winter Hill associates and gang members, who were informing on Bulger and Flemmi. A number of known informants were murdered including Richie Castucci, Brian Halloran, John Callahan and John McIntyre.

According to court records, "in 1988 or 1989, (FBI) Agent John Connolly indirectly warned Stephen Flemmi through James Bulger that alleged extortion victim Timothy Connolly was cooperating with the FBI and would attempt to record conversations with Flemmi."

John Connolly was reportedly paid "ten grand" for this information on Tim Connolly. John Connolly is serving a ten-year, 2002 federal prison sentence, for racketeering and obstruction of justice. John Connolly was indicted in May 2008 for the murder of John Callahan, a Miami gaming executive with ties to the Winter Hill. John Connolly is currently on trial for capital murder in Miami, Florida.
