= Edward Donnally =

Edward Carper Donnally
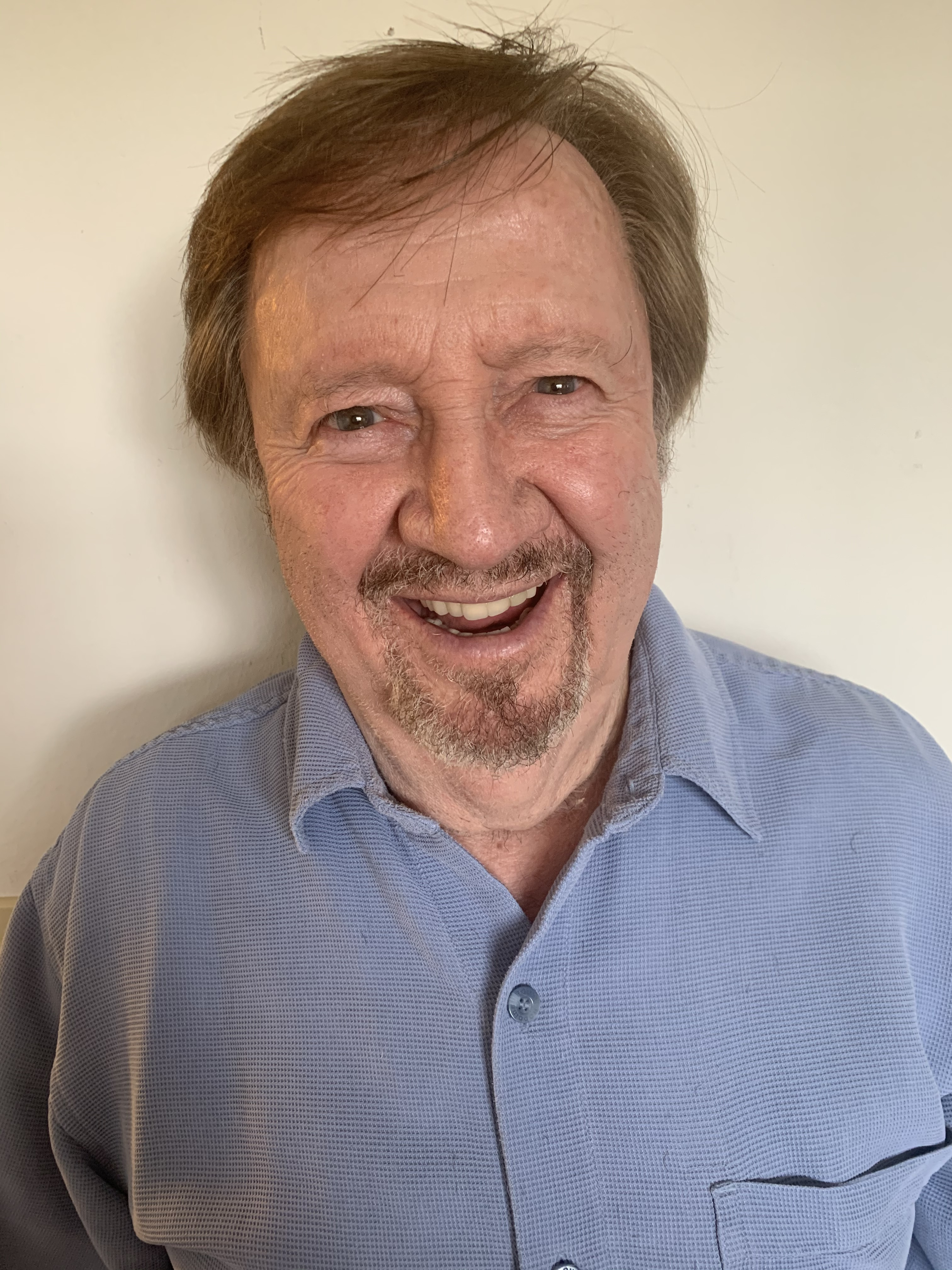
- Born: August 17, 1943 (age 83); Fayette County, West Virginia, US
- Education: Doctorate of Ministry Summit Bible College
- Alma mater: Summits Bible College
- Occupations: Evangelist TV Show Host, YouTube Creator, Hospital and Hospice Chaplain, Prison Minister, Writer.
- Spouse: Sandi Steele Donnally
- Children: Dawn Thee and Derek Donnally
- Website: eddonnally.com

Edward Donnally is a former American jockey, newspaper journalist, horse racing handicapper, and TV show host.

== Biography ==
In October 1974, Donnally took an $800 bribe, as a jockey, to keep his mount, Society Boy, from finishing third in a race at Boston's Suffolk Downs Racetrack. But the horse won. In 1976, the gang's race-fixing leader, Anthony "Fat Tony" Cuilla, was arrested and became a relocated government witness. In 1978, Donnally found himself caught between Boston's Winter Hill Gang, led then by Howard "Howie" Winter with James "Whitey" Bulger, and the FBI. He was indicted for Sports Bribery, arrested, and faced five years in a Federal Prison. He was forced to testify and use his Fifth Amendment rights in the Trial that sentenced Winter Hill Gang members to lengthy prison terms. After the trial, charges against Donnally were dropped, and the next year, he retired from riding races. He worked as a journalist for The Dallas Morning News from 1982 to 1989.

After being released from the Los Angeles County Jail where he served 16 days for misdemeanor battery in 1996, he was commissioned as an International Church of the Foursquare Gospel Minister. He has appeared on several nationwide television shows.

== Books ==
Donnally has written an autobiography titled, “Ride The White Horse: A Checkered Jockey’s Story of Rage, Racing, and Redemption”. He has authored two more books, “The Golden Altar: Selling Souls For A Horse With No Name” and “Doctrines of Demons: The New Age Dawns (Trilogy Book 1)”.

== Awards and achievements ==
In 1984, Donnally became the only former jockey to win Thoroughbred Racing's Eclipse Award for Newspaper Feature Writing on Randy Romero.
