= Edward G. Connors =

American boxer (1933–1975)

- Born: January 1, 1933; Sharon, Massachusetts, U.S.
- Died: June 12, 1975 (aged 42); Dorchester, Massachusetts, U.S.
- Cause of death: Gun shots
- Other names: The Bulldog, Eddie
- Allegiance: Winter Hill Gang

Edward George Connors (January 1, 1933 – June 12, 1975), also known as "the Bulldog", was an American associate of the Winter Hill Gang and successful bar owner in Savin Hill.

== Early life ==
Edward George Connors was born in Sharon, Massachusetts but raised in the Old Colony housing development at 265 East Ninth in South Boston, one of the Boston Housing Authority's oldest housing developments. His family suffered from financial problems and moved around frequently, they later moved to New Bedford, Massachusetts where they gave birth to his younger brother James Connors (December 24, 1936 – November 9, 2006). Like Edward, James pursued a career as a professional featherweight boxer like his brother Edward and later a career in the U.S. Air Force. Edward was a sparring partner of Anthony Veranis and Joe DeNucci. Edward had a close physical resemblance to heavyweight boxer Rocky Marciano. As a youth he was a regular at the L Street Curley Gym and Bathhouse located at 1663 Columbia Road in South Boston where Stephen Flemmi, James J. Bulger, Frank Salemme and William Bulger all hung out. In high school he was in the Old Colony Regional Vocational Technical High School basketball team in Rochester, Massachusetts as number "4" in 1955 and brought the team to the Massachusetts Interscholastic Athletic Association Northeastern Conference championships that year.

After graduating high school, he enlisted in the U.S. Marines. His brother James followed Edward into the military and joined the U.S. Air Force and became a fighter pilot stationed at McGuire Air Force Base. Edward was trained at Fort Devens, Massachusetts where he was later placed in the 1st Battalion 25th Marines. While in the U.S. Marines he started boxing and excelled at it. After his honorable discharge he took up professional boxing. During his professional boxing career, he received sponsorship by the boxing equipment and sportswear company Ben Lee, which would also sponsor his younger brother, James. As a professional boxer he worked with professional welterweight boxer and trainer Andy Escobar, Connors was his only client. He later opened up several barrooms in Revere and Dorchester, Massachusetts including "The Bulldog Tavern" in Savin Hill which began a hangout for known mob associates, loansharking and bookmaking. He is a close friend of Winter Hill Gang associate Alan Fidler. He was involved in bookmaking, loan sharking and drug trafficking with Alan Fidler. Edward was a close friend of future Massachusetts State Senator William R. Keating and Boston Mayor Ray Flynn who were introduced to each other for the first time at his saloon, The Bulldog. He was known as a vicious bar room brawler and worked as a bouncer and a bartender at The Bulldog which he used as his criminal headquarters for illegal gambling, drug dealing, loansharking and planned armed robberies with his associates.

== Boxing career ==
Edward G. Connors
Personal information
- Nickname: Eddie Connors
- Born: Edward George Connors
- Weight: Middleweight

Boxing career

Boxing record
- Total fights: 30
- Wins: 22
- Win by KO: 18
- Losses: 7
- Draws: 1

Connors was a Middleweight boxer who fought with an orthodox stance. He was known for his agility and quickness to fight and earned a reputation as a "hard hitter". During his professional boxing career he weighed between 158 and 161 pounds. His first professional fight was against Billy Wilcox on August 3, 1954, in Boston, Massachusetts. On April 20, 1959, Connors was knocked out by Tony DeMarco in the sixth round and lost. His last professional boxing match was against Willie Green on December 21, 1960, in Providence, Rhode Island. On April 14, 1959, he boxed against future Massachusetts State Auditor Joe DeNucci and lost. On November 21, 1960, he fought against Willie Green for the New England Middleweight title championship and lost. During his overall professional boxing career he won twenty-two fights and had eighteen fights end in knock outs. He would later use his boxing training to handle drunk and disorderly customers in his Bulldog Tavern where he acted as a bartender and bouncer. Both Edward Connors and Jimmy Connors were managed by Maury Fisher.

== Spike O'Toole slaying ==
Winter Hill Gang associate James "Spike" O'Toole was a troubled alcoholic and a habitué of Connor's saloon, the Bulldog Tavern in Savin Hill. He tipped off his friend Howie Winter about O'Toole's drinking habits, and Winter told Connors to inform him the next time O'Toole was drinking at his saloon. O'Toole was later machine gunned by John Martorano as he walked out of his saloon on December 1, 1973.

== Gangland slaying ==
After "Spike" O'Toole's gangland murder, Connors openly discussed his role in orchestrating the O'Toole murder with associates and patrons of his saloons in 1975. He also had been arrested in the commission of a botched armed robbery. During law enforcement's investigation into Connors his establishments were wire tapped, where they overheard enough information to bring Connors in for further questioning. Facing prison time and losing everything he had worked so hard for, Connors agreed to turn state evidence and testify against the Winter Hill gang with the promise of being put into a witness protection program and being able to retire with his family in Ireland. Needless to say with so many people on the Winter Hill payroll, word quickly spread up the ranks in law enforcement where Howie Winter soon learned that Connors was talking, and implicating the Winter Hill Gang in the O'Toole murder. Winter sent a message to Connors to give Winter the number for a "safe" telephone (one that was not tapped by the authorities), at which Winter could call Connors and discuss the matter. Connors was to appear at the station at 9:00 p.m. to receive the call from Howie Winter. Howie obtained the number and James J. Bulger, John Martorano and Stephen Flemmi tracked the number through contacts at Boston Edison to a pay telephone outside a gas station on William T. Morrissey Boulevard in Dorchester. Winter then arranged to call Connors at that telephone at a pre-determined time. One hundred yards away, 150 officers from the Boston Police Department were enjoying a banquet. All later reported to their superiors that they did not hear any of the gunfire. The only problem for the murder, was a Metropolitan District Commission police traffic detail was situated almost directly across the boulevard from the phone booth.

James J. Bulger quickly found another phone booth and called in a false accident report to the MDC police. The traffic detail immediately left to answer the alarm, and moments later Connors pulled up in his Cadillac to await the call. On June 12, 1975, John Martorano drove to the gas station with James J. Bulger and Stephen Flemmi in a stolen sedan. The two men walked to the phone booth where Connors was talking to Howie Winter. Bulger and Flemmi, armed with a shotgun and automatic carbine rifle riddled the telephone booth with bullets, hitting Connors numerous times, almost cutting him in two. He died instantly.
