= Paul McGonagle =

American gangster (1939–1974)

- McGonagle's November 2, 1964 mugshot
- Born: Paul C. McGonagle; January 21, 1939; Quincy, Massachusetts, U.S.
- Disappeared: November 20, 1974
- Died: November 20, 1974 (aged 35); Boston, Massachusetts, U.S.
- Cause of death: Gun shot
- Body discovered: September 2000
- Other name: "Paulie"
- Occupation: Mobster
- Spouse: Margaret Greig
- Children: 2
- Allegiance: Mullen Gang; Winter Hill Gang

Paul McGonagle Sr. (January 21, 1939 – November 20, 1974) was an American mobster and leader of the Mullen Gang, an Irish mob group in South Boston involved in burglary and armed robbery. During a gang war, Paul's brother Donald was killed by Killeen Gang member Whitey Bulger in November 1969 when Bulger mistook Donald for Paul. At the conclusion of the gang war in 1972, the Mullens and Killeens were both consolidated under the control of the Winter Hill Gang. After expressing his desire to seek revenge for his brother's murder, Paul himself was killed by Bulger and buried on a Dorchester beach in November 1974. His remains were unearthed in September 2000.

== Early life ==
Paul ("Paulie") McGonagle was the oldest of several brothers born to first generation Irish Catholic immigrants, and raised in South Boston. One of the brothers was Robert ("Bobby"), a gangster who became a Boston firefighter. Paul and brother Donald ("Donnie", "Donny") were fraternal twins. Unlike his brothers, Donnie McGonagle was not involved in organized crime.

While in South Boston, he married Margaret Greig (born April 3, 1951), from East Boston, identical twin sister of Catherine Elizabeth Greig, wife of his brother Bobby. They had two sons, Paul Jr. and Sean McGonagle. The Greig sisters had a younger brother David. McGonagle and Margaret moved into a home in suburban Quincy, Massachusetts, where she lived during their marriage. Sister-in-law Catherine later divorced Bobby before taking up with Winter Hill Gang leader James "Whitey" Bulger.

== Criminal career ==
McGonagle became the leader of the Mullen Gang and was involved in burglary, theft and armed robbery. The 5' 7" McGonagle wore platform shoes because he was conscious of his height. The Mullens, a loose-knit street gang consisting of approximately 60 members at their peak, became involved in a turf war in South Boston with the Killeen Gang, a smaller but more organized group of criminals led by the Killeen brothers. The Mullens began encroaching on the territory of the Killeens, who had been the dominant gang in South Boston for two decades.

The Mullen–Killeen feud escalated significantly after an incident in 1969 in which Kenny Killeen bit off the nose of Mullen Gang member Mickey Dwyer in a bar fight. Paul McGonagle's younger brother Donald, who shared a fleeting physical resemblance with Paul, lived a law-abiding life and did not follow his brother into a life of organized crime. Donny, however, was mistaken by Killeen enforcer James "Whitey" Bulger to be Paul and was shot in the face while driving Paul's car, on November 18, 1969.

According to Bulger associate Kevin Weeks,

One day while the gang war was still going on, Jimmy (Bulger) was driving down Seventh Street in South Boston when he saw Paulie driving toward him. Jimmy pulled up beside him, window to window, nose to nose, and called his name. As Paulie looked over, Jimmy shot him right between the eyes. Only at that moment, just as he pulled the trigger, Jimmy realized it wasn't Paulie. It was Donald, the most likable of the McGonagle brothers, the only one who wasn't involved in anything. Jimmy drove straight to Billy O'Sullivan's house on Savin Hill Avenue and told Billy O, who was at the stove cooking, 'I shot the wrong one. I shot Donald.' Billy looked up from the stove and said, 'Don't worry about it. He wasn't healthy anyway. He smoked. He would have gotten lung cancer. How do you want your pork chops?'

During the Killeen-Mullen gang war, McGonagle and Irish immigrant Patrick "Pat" Nee successfully led the Mullens against the Killeen brothers' organization. According to Nee, McGonagle was enraged by the murder of his brother. Certain that Billy O'Sullivan was responsible, McGonagle ambushed and murdered Bulger's mentor on March 28, 1971. The gang war nominally ended when the neighbourhood boss Donald Killeen was gunned down outside his suburban Framingham home on May 13, 1972. According to Nee, McGonagle led the shootout that resulted in Killeen's death. The leadership of the Killeen Gang then passed to Bulger.

Rather than murdering Bulger, as some Killeens desired, Nee arranged for their dispute with him to be mediated by Howie Winter, the godfather of the Winter Hill Gang. Outnumbered, the Killeens agreed to negotiate with the Mullens. After a meeting in the South End, the two gangs joined forces with Winter as overall boss. Bulger, who proved a reliable moneymaker for Winter, was soon in control of the South Boston rackets.

== Murder ==
McGonagle remained openly angry and vengeful towards Bulger over his brother's murder, and Bulger thus considered him a threat. Bulger continued to harbor a desire to kill McGonagle and bided his time until he devised a scheme. After obtaining a batch of new $20 bills from a bank, Bulger presented the bank notes to McGonagle as counterfeit bills, or "queers", and offered to sell him a briefcase full of the supposed counterfeits. Impressed by how authentic the purported "queers" appeared, McGonagle agreed to meet Bulger that evening, on November 20, 1974, behind a gas station in the Lower End to make the purchase. McGonagle arrived at the meeting with the cash and climbed into the back seat of a car with Bulger, who handed him the briefcase then drew a gun and shot McGonagle in the head. Bulger's associate Johnny Martorano later confessed to being involved in the murder. According to Patrick Nee, another former Mullen Gang member, Thomas "Tommy" King, also participated.

McGonagle was buried and covered with rocks in a three-foot deep grave at Tenean Beach in Dorchester. Bulger would later reportedly remark "Drink up, Paulie" when driving past the beach. To misdirect the police, Bulger left McGonagle's car in Charlestown, and dumped his effects off a Charlestown pier. Bulger then made an anonymous tip that led police to mistakenly believe that McGonagle had been killed by the Charlestown Mob. A year after McGonagle's disappearance, Bulger approached his 15-year-old son, Paul McGonagle Jr., and deceptively told him that he had "took care of the guys who got [his] father".

=== Aftermath ===
It has since been revealed by investigators that Bulger was responsible for McGonagle's disappearance. The murder was almost certainly sanctioned by Howie Winter, who authorized the killings of any Winter Hill Gang member who was deemed to be subversive. At the time of McGonagle's murder, his estranged wife Margaret was left a widow. Margaret was granted a divorce, on grounds of abandonment, and remarried, to a James McCusker, to whom she was still married as of 2008. Paul's younger brother Bobby married Catherine Greig in 1971, but left her for her twin sister and Paul's widow, Margaret, in 1973, and the couple were granted a divorce in 1977. Bobby McGonagle and Margaret McCusker never married but remained together until his death from a drug overdose in 1987. Catherine Greig became the longtime mistress of Bulger in 1975. The Federal Bureau of Investigation (FBI) stated on their wanted fugitive poster of Greig that one of the aliases she was known to have used in 1995 before she fled with Bulger was "Catherine McGonagle", taking the last name of her slain brother-in-law as her own after going on the run with Bulger. McGonagle's brother-in-law, David S. Greig Jr., an associate of Bulger, committed suicide by gunshot in Cape Cod in May 1984, at the age of 26.

McGonagle's skeletal remains were discovered in September 2000 after Kevin Weeks turned government witness and led investigators to the gravesite. According to forensic anthropologist Ann Marie Mires, McGonagle's bones were "the consistency of wet cardboard" due to seawater seeping into the grave, and his skeleton is "now part of the beach". All that could be retrieved from McGonagle's grave was his dentures, Claddagh ring, platform shoes, and the bullet in his skull.

In January 2013, Bulger, an FBI informant, was convicted of the murders of McGonagle and ten others. In June 2015, McGonagle's widow and two sons, Sean and Paul Jr., filed a $10 million civil action lawsuit against the FBI, alleging that the bureau and Bulger's handler, John Connolly, knew that McGonagle was dead and where his body was buried, and withheld that information from his family. The lawsuit was thrown out in January 2016 by U.S. District Court Judge F. Dennis Saylor IV, who ruled that the FBI had no legal duty to report anything they knew about McGonagle's whereabouts.

== See also ==
- List of people who disappeared mysteriously: post-1970
