= Telex Communications =

American audio equipment company

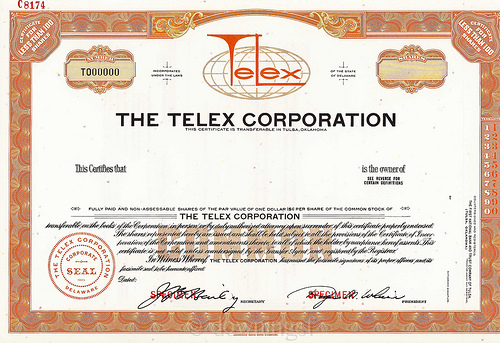
The Telex Corp. specimen stock certificate

Telex Communications, Inc., originally Telex Corporation, was a Burnsville, Minnesota-based manufacturer of hearing aids and audio equipment. Founded in 1936 as a maker of hearing aids, it entered the computer peripherals businesses in the 1960s. Telex Communications was structured as a subsidiary of Telex Corp in the 1970s. Telex Corp was acquired by Memorex in 1988, which renamed itself Memorex Telex NV. The hearing aid portion of Telex Corp. was subsequently spun-out in 1989 as Telex Communications, an independent company. Memorex retained Telex Corp's peripherals businesses.

In February 1998 Telex Communications merged with Electro-Voice.

In August 2006, the company was acquired by Germany's Bosch Group for $420 million, becoming a business unit under the name "Bosch Communications Systems".

In 2025, the security/communications/conference systems business unit of Bosch, which included the Dynacord and Electro-Voice brands along with the conference systems product line, was sold to Triton Partners, an investment firm to be operated as Keenfinity Group.

One of its chairmen, Roger Wheeler, was murdered by the Winter Hill Gang in 1981 at Southern Hills Country Club in Tulsa, Oklahoma.
