= William S. O'Sullivan =

American loanshark and longtime enforcer for Donald Killeen (1928-1971)

- Born: January 31, 1928; South Boston, Boston, Massachusetts, U.S.
- Died: March 28, 1971 (aged 43); Dorchester, Boston, Massachusetts, U.S.
- Other name: Billy
- Occupation: Mobster
- Spouse: Mary O'Sullivan
- Children: 6

William S. O'Sullivan (January 31, 1928 – March 28, 1971) was an American loanshark and longtime enforcer for Donald Killeen, the head of the Irish mob in South Boston, Massachusetts. O'Sullivan also acted as a mentor to a young James J. Bulger, who grew up to become the leader of Boston's Winter Hill Gang.

== Biography ==
O'Sullivan was born in South Boston. He moved to the Savin Hill section of Dorchester with his wife, Mary, with whom he had six children. He worked for the state Massachusetts Department of Public Works until he was injured on the job in 1970 working on an MBTA tunnel at South Bay, Boston in South Cove. He had also previously worked as a bartender in South Boston. His wife Mary later told reporters, "Bill was a kind father. He wasn't strict with the children. He like young people, however, he was against... long hair... he didn't think it looked right."

They lived in a home at 300 Savin Hill Avenue. After her husband was murdered Mary professed not to have any knowledge on why her husband was shot to death, practically on the front steps of their home. She stated to the press that she was convinced that her husband's murder was not "one of those gangland slayings". She would later say that William was a "quiet man", a "fine husband" and a "wonderful father, and that he (wasn't) the type of person that you would associate with gangsters." Contrary to statements made by his wife, FBI documents report that O'Sullivan had a reputation as a "tough guy" and a prosperous loanshark because he was a close associate of Stephen Flemmi and Frank Salemme.

After Salemme and Flemmi fled Boston as fugitives from murder convictions, rival mobster Donald Killeen wanted O'Sullivan to align himself with Ilario Zannino and himself. However, Killeen had begun having problems with the Mullen Gang, a group of burglars and stick up men led by Paul McGonagle and Patrick Nee.

== The Mullen-Killeen war ==
In February 1971, Buddy Roache, a close associate of McGonagle told Whitey Bulger and O'Sullivan that he was going to murder Donald Killeen, and if they interfered, he would kill them. A violent argument followed, Roache drew his weapon and O'Sullivan shot him. Roache was hospitalized but survived the near fatal gunshot wound. Following the shooting, both Bulger, O'Sullivan, and neighborhood boss Donald Killeen expected retribution for the attack on a ranking member of the rival Mullen Gang. This fear proved well-founded and the rivalry between the Mullens and Killeens exploded into a gangland war.

According to longtime Bulger confidant Kevin Weeks, Bulger's murder of Paul McGonagle's brother led directly to the Mullen Gang's assassination of his mentor. According to Weeks,

One day while the gang war was still going on, Jimmy was driving down Seventh Street in South Boston when he saw Paulie driving toward him. Jimmy pulled up beside him, window to window, nose to nose, and called his name. As Paulie looked over, Jimmy shot him right between the eyes. Only at that moment, just as he pulled the trigger, Jimmy realized it wasn't Paulie. It was Donald, the most likable of the McGonagle brothers, the only one who wasn't involved in anything. Jimmy drove straight to Billy O'Sullivan's house on Savin Hill Avenue and told Billy O, who was at the stove cooking, 'I shot the wrong one. I shot Donald.' Billy looked up from the stove and said, 'Don't worry about it. He wasn't healthy anyway. He smoked. He would have gotten lung cancer. How do you want your pork chops?'.

== Murder victim ==
According to the memoirs of Mullen leader Patrick Nee, Paul McGonagle was thoroughly livid over the murder of his brother and, believing that O'Sullivan was responsible, received permission to kill him. On March 28, 1971, after having dinner with his wife at Jimmy's Harborside Restaurant, O'Sullivan dropped his wife off at their home and told her that he had an errand to do and that he would be back in an hour. Shortly after midnight, Mary noticed that his car was parked in the driveway in front of their house at the bottom of their driveway, it was surrounded by a group of neighbors. She went out to see what her neighbors were looking at and she saw her husband's bullet riddled body. She at first did not recognize his body but made positive identification from the suit that he wore. O'Sullivan had been shot by several gunmen numerous times as he sat behind the wheel of his car and was hanging half out of the car with the driver's door open.

According to Weeks,

Billy O'Sullivan's death might not have happened if he had listened to Jimmy. Billy O had been with Jimmy against the Mullens and had shot Buddy Roache during the gang war. Buddy, whose brother Mickey later became Boston's police commissioner, ended up crippled and in a wheelchair. In March 1971, not long after he shot the wrong McGonagle, Jimmy went to New York to pick up guns. Before he left, he told Billy to be careful while he was gone and not to drink. But that night, Billy hung around with Kevin O'Neil down at the Transit Cafe and ended up drunk. Kevin offered him a ride home, but Billy refused the offer. Heading home, He was chased by a couple of men with the Mullens gang who caught up with him when he tripped over a manhole cover about 200 yards from his house and fell down. While he was lying there, the pursuers shot him to death. If Kevin O'Neil had ended up driving Billy O'Sullivan home that night, he probably would have been killed, too.

== Aftermath ==
In June 1972, Donald Killeen was murdered by Jimmy Mantville, another enforcer for the Mullen Gang. In the aftermath, the leadership of the Killeen crew devolved on Bulger. However, Bulger and the other Killeen loyalists fled Boston after the murder of their boss. Instead of murdering them as some Mullen gangsters wished, Mullen leader Patrick Nee arranged for the dispute to be mediated by Winter Hill Gang boss Howie Winter and Joseph Russo of the Patriarca crime family. After a sit-down in Boston's South End, the Mullen and Killeen gangs joined forces with Howie Winter as overall boss. In November 1974, Bulger, "took care of the right brother".
