= Donald Killeen =

American mob boss (1923–1972)

- Born: September 14, 1923; South Boston, Boston, Massachusetts, U.S.
- Died: May 13, 1972 (aged 48); Framingham, Massachusetts, U.S.
- Cause of death: Gun shots
- Occupation: Crime boss
- Years active: 1940s–1972
- Children: 1
- Allegiance: Killeen Gang
- Criminal charges: Bookmaking, loansharking

Donald Killeen (September 14, 1923 – May 13, 1972) was an American mob boss known for his control of criminal enterprises, including bookmaking, loansharking, and numbers operations in South Boston from the late 1940s to the early 1970s.

== Early life ==
Donald Killeen, born in 1923, was the eldest of four brothers: Edward, George, and Kenneth "Kenny" Killeen.

== The Transit Cafe ==
Killeen owned and managed the Transit Cafe bar on West Broadway in South Boston. The Transit Cafe was later managed by Kevin Weeks, an associate of the Winter Hill Gang led by James "Whitey" Bulger. His organization included Whitey Bulger, William S. O'Sullivan, and Jack Curran. He was involved in a turf war with the Mullen Gang in South Boston.

== Personal life ==
In 1950, Donald's brother George was the first sibling to be murdered, found shot to death in the North End neighborhood. His murderers were never discovered. In 1971, Kenneth bit off the nose of Michael Dwyer, a rival Boston gang member and former brother-in-law of Boston Police Department Commissioner Francis Roche. Kenneth sent the severed nose to Boston City Hospital in a cab for reattachment. Kenneth's brother, Edward, was found dead from a gunshot wound in 1968, ruled a suicide. Kenneth became a father to a son in 1968.

== Murder ==
He was murdered outside his home in Framingham, Massachusetts on May 13, 1972, while being lured away by an associate on his son Gregory's fourth birthday. He left the house under the pretense of fetching a newspaper, but actually went to retrieve his son's gift, a toy fire engine, from the trunk of his 1971 Chevrolet Nova. Donald retrieved a gun from under the driver's seat of his car, but before he could use it, a gunman opened the car door, pointed a machine gun at him, and fired fifteen rounds.

Killeen's murder remains unsolved. According to Patrick Nee, Paul McGonagle was the lead shooter in the killing. Kevin Weeks disputes this claim, stating that two other Mullen enforcers, "Jimmy Mantville and another fellow", were responsible for the hit. Conversely, a rumor suggests that Whitey Bulger may have killed Killeen to take over as gang boss.

=== Aftermath ===
The youngest brother, Kenny Killeen, was jogging past a parked car with four men in the City Point neighborhood of Boston. The men in the car were Whitey Bulger, Stephen Flemmi and John Martorano. He said that Bulger called him over to the car and said, "It's over. You're out of business. No further warnings"—a message to not try to take over his brothers' rackets or avenge their deaths.
