= John Shea (mobster) =

Irish-American former mobster

John "Red" Shea (born August 12, 1965) is an American former mobster from Boston involved in narcotics and an associate of crime kingpin Whitey Bulger and the Winter Hill Gang during the 1980s and 1990s. He was indicted on cocaine trafficking charges in 1990 and served 12 years in prison.

Shea created a successful cocaine distribution enterprise with Bulger, but Bulger remained insulated from the operation to create a charade that he was not involved in the drug trade.

Shea wrote a book called Rat Bastards; The Story of South Boston's Most Honorable Irish Mobster about his experience with the Winter Hill Gang. His refusal to accept a plea deal to testify against his associates led him to serve the full sentence for his conviction. John Shea continued his writing career with the acclaimed young adult novel A Kid From Southie. The story was inspired by Shea's life growing up with an alcoholic father, pursuing the dream of becoming a boxer, experiencing teenage romance, and navigating the criminal underworld of South Boston.

During a game of football with his friend Mark Wahlberg and actor Alec Baldwin on the set of The Departed, Baldwin accidentally fractured Shea's thumb. A fight almost broke out between the two before Wahlberg intervened.

Shea continues to do national and local commentary for the news media, CNN, FOX and others on Whitey Bulger and additional stories about organized crime.
