= John Morris (FBI) =

American former FBI agent who was charged with corruption

- Born: 1947 (age 78–79)
- Occupation: Former FBI agent

John Morris (born 1947) is an American former FBI agent who was charged with corruption for his involvement with James "Whitey" Bulger, Steve Flemmi and the Winter Hill Gang. He was the direct supervisor of John Connolly, who was convicted of racketeering, obstruction of justice and murder. He and Connolly compiled much of Bulger's 700-page FBI informant file.

Morris met Bulger for the first time in 1978, when Morris hosted a dinner at his home in Lexington, Massachusetts. Morris was put in charge of the Organized Crime Squad at the FBI's Boston field office in December 1977. Morris not only proved himself unable to rein in Connolly's protection of Bulger, but even began assisting him.

In February 1979, federal prosecutors indicted numerous members of the Winter Hill Gang, including boss Howie Winter, for fixing horse races. Bulger and Stephen Flemmi were originally going to be part of this indictment, but Connolly and Morris were able to persuade prosecutor Jeremiah T. O'Sullivan to drop the charges against them at the last minute. Bulger and Flemmi were instead named as unindicted co-conspirators.

By 1982, Morris was "thoroughly compromised", to the point of having Bulger purchase plane tickets for his then-girlfriend Debbie Noseworthy to visit him in Georgia while he was being trained for drug investigations. Even after 1983, when Morris was transferred to lead the Boston FBI's anti-drug task force, he remained an accomplice to Connolly and Bulger.

In an attempt to protect himself, Morris disclosed the FBI's protection of Bulger in an off-the-record interview with the Boston Globe in 1988. He was later granted immunity in exchange for a testimony against Connolly, who was jailed for forty years for second-degree murder. He was released in 2021 on medical grounds.

Morris was played by David Harbour in the 2015 movie Black Mass.

== Personal life ==
Morris was married twice; firstly to Rebecca, then to his former secretary, with whom he had a decade-long affair.
