= Kevin O'Neil (mobster) =

Irish-American mobster

Kevin O'Neill (born 1948) is an American South Boston former bar owner and former associate of notorious Winter Hill Gang boss Whitey Bulger.

== Triple O's Lounge ==
Kevin O'Neill and his two brothers owned and operated Triple O's Lounge in South Boston, which served as the headquarters of Whitey Bulger's gang from the 1970s to the 1990s. O'Neill used the bar as a front for the gang's money laundering operations. In 1999, he was arrested along with Bulger henchman, Kevin Weeks.

On September 30, 2004, O'Neil was sentenced to a year in prison for racketeering, extortion and money laundering.
