= Jeremiah O'Sullivan (lawyer) =

Prosecutor linked to Whitey Bulger's immunity (died 2009)

Jeremiah T. O'Sullivan (died February 10, 2009) was a Boston-based federal prosecutor for the United States Department of Justice at a time when Federal Bureau of Investigation (FBI) agents collaborated with Winter Hill Gang leader James "Whitey" Bulger. He was subsequently accused of participating in a scheme to grant immunity to Bulger to commit violent crimes in return for information about the Patriarca crime family.

O'Sullivan was a lawyer in the 1970s and 1980s, prior to becoming the head of the New England Organized Crime Strike Force. In 1970, he was the Deputy Assistant Attorney-General for the Commonwealth of Massachusetts.

In February 1979, federal prosecutors indicted numerous members of the Winter Hill Gang, including boss Howie Winter, for fixing horse races. Bulger and his right-hand man Steve Flemmi were originally going to be part of this indictment, but Federal Bureau of Investigation (FBI) agent John Connolly and his supervisor John Morris were able to persuade O'Sullivan to drop the charges against them at the last minute. Bulger and Flemmi were instead named as unindicted co-conspirators. In 2009, Connolly was sentenced to forty years in prison for second-degree murder. Morris was granted immunity in exchange for a testimony against Connolly.

In 1998, O'Sullivan suffered a heart attack and several strokes after being asked to testify about Bulger and Flemmi. He remained in a coma for a month. Five years later, O'Sullivan spoke in front of Congress during the Committee on Government Reform's investigation of the FBI's Boston branch. He stated that he knew some informants were committing murder and that they had relationships with FBI, but O'Sullivan said he did not act upon the situation because he was "intimidated by the bureau". O'Sullivan denied having personally provided protection to Bulger and his associates.

In 2012, he was identified by defense lawyers in a racketeering case as having provided immunity to Bulger.

O'Sullivan died on February 10, 2009, at the age of 66. In the 2015 film Black Mass, O'Sullivan was portrayed by Lewis D. Wheeler.
