= Mullen Gang =

Irish-American gang

- Founded: c. 1950s
- Founding location: Boston, Massachusetts, United States
- Years active: c. 1950s–1972
- Territory: South Boston
- Ethnicity: Irish American
- Membership (est.): 60
- Leaders: Paul McGonagle; Patrick Nee
- Activities: Racketeering, armed robbery, auto theft, burglary, extortion, loansharking, illegal gambling, murder
- Allies: Winter Hill Gang
- Rivals: Killeen Gang

The Mullen Gang was an Irish-American gang operating in Boston, Massachusetts. The gang derived its name from a commemorative plaque to a war hero named John Joseph Mullen, which was located on a street corner in South Boston that the gang's members frequented. After a decade-long gang war against another Irish mob group, the Killeen Gang, for control of criminal rackets in South Boston, both gangs were consolidated under the control of the Winter Hill Gang in 1972.

== Gang members ==
Paulie McGonagle (died November 1974) was a Boston mobster and onetime leader of the Mullen Gang, a South Boston street gang involved in burglary, auto theft, and armed robbery. During the war against Donald Killeen and his brothers, McGonagle successfully led the Mullens in a string of shootings which finally ended with Killeen's murder in 1972. After a truce was arranged with Whitey Bulger and the remnants of the Killeen organization, McGonagle remained angry about Bulger's accidental murder of his fraternal twin brother, Donald McGonagle. It is believed that this was one of the reasons for his disappearance in November 1974. His body was later excavated from a shallow grave on Boston's Tenean Beach.

Tommy King (died 1975) was a Boston mobster and member of the Mullens during their gang war against Donald Killeen and his lieutenants Billy O'Sullivan and James J. Bulger during the early 1970s. Following Killeen's murder in 1972, he became an associate of Bulger and the Winter Hill Gang after his alleged involvement in the death of Paul McGonagle. In 1975, he disappeared following an altercation with Bulger in a Southie watering hole. He was suspected of having been killed by hitman John Martorano.

Patrick Nee was born to an Irish-speaking family in Rosmuc, Ireland in 1944. He was brought to the US by his parents in 1952 and became a member of the Mullen Gang at the age of 14. He fought in several turf battles before joining the US Marine Corps. He arrived in Vietnam in 1965 and saw combat at Phu Bai. After his return to South Boston in October 1966, he rejoined the Mullens and became one of their leaders in the war against the Killeen brothers. Nee arranged the truce that ended the war by arranging a sit-down in Boston's South End. After being supplanted by Bulger, he moved to Charlestown, Massachusetts and switched increasingly to smuggling arms to the Provisional IRA. He currently resides in South Boston and is the author of the memoir, A Criminal and an Irishman.

James "Jimmy" Mantville

== Feud with the Killeen Gang ==
The Killeen brothers - Donald, Kenneth, George and Edward - were an Irish-American crime family which ran the bookmaking and loansharking in South Boston, Massachusetts. They used muscle to make collections, and to make examples of those who didn't pay in a timely fashion.

The Mullens, by contrast, were a loosely organized crew of thieves. But being in Southie, it was just a matter of time before they butted heads with the Killeens. The Mullens Gang were mostly thieves who stole from the ships that brought goods into Boston Harbor and from the warehouses where they were stored. The crew was particularly talented and opportunistic, as likely to steal a truckload of Easter hams as one of televisions. They also had strength in numbers; the Boston Police Department at one time estimated there were as many as sixty members.

The turf war between the Mullens and the Killeens began in the mid-1960s. However, it was an incident in 1969 which escalated the feud. Donald Killeen's younger brother, Kenneth, bit off the nose of Mickie Dwyer, a member of the rival Mullen Gang, at the Transit Café, a South Boston bar. Paulie McGonagle, Francis (Buddy) Leonard, Thomas King, and Dennis (Buddy) Roche went to The Transit (the Killeen Gang's main base of operations) looking to confront the Killeens who had already left the bar. The presence of the Mullens at the Killeens headquarters was viewed as a direct challenge by Donald Killeen. A gangland war soon resulted, leading to a string of slayings throughout Boston and the surrounding suburbs.

Several weeks following the Transit incident, Killeen enforcers Billy O'Sullivan and "Whitey" Bulger encountered Mullen member "Buddy" Roache, brother of future Police Commissioner Francis "Mickey" Roache, in a bar on Broadway in South Boston. After a heated argument, Roache was shot and left paralyzed for life.

A short time later, Bulger and O'Sullivan killed Donald McGonagle. Donald was not a member of the Mullens and was killed by mistake. His brother, Paulie McGonagle vowed revenge and according to Patrick Nee personally murdered O’Sullivan near his house at Savin Hill at just past midnight on the morning of March 28, 1971.

The killing of O’Sullivan revitalized the Mullens and the Killeens quickly found themselves outgunned and outmaneuvered.

On May 13, 1972, South Boston mob boss Donald Killeen was shot to death by Mullen gang enforcer Jimmy Mantville outside his home in suburban Framingham, Massachusetts. The leadership of the Killeen faction then devolved on Bulger, who was in hiding on Cape Cod. Rather than murdering Bulger as some Mullens, including Paulie McGonagle desired, Patrick Nee arranged for their dispute to be mediated by Howie Winter, the godfather of the Irish-American Winter Hill Gang of Somerville and Joseph Russo of the Patriarca crime family. After a sit-down at Chandler's restaurant in the South End, Boston, the two gangs joined forces with Winter as overall boss.

By 1973 Bulger was in control of the rackets in South Boston. He began to use his influence to remove opposition, by persuading Winter to sanction the murders of those rivals whom he viewed as having stepped out of line. These included former Mullens Spike O'Toole and Paulie McGonagle, who was murdered by Bulger and buried in a shallow grave in Boston's Tenean Beach. It is also alleged that Bulger had direct involvement in the murders of Eddie Connors in January 1975 and Mullens Tommy King and Buddy Leonard in November 1975.

== See also ==
- Charlestown Mob
- Boston Irish Gang War
