= Patrick Nee =

American organized crime figure

- Born: December 22, 1944 (age 81); Ros Muc, County Galway, Ireland
- Other names: "Pat"; "Paddy Kneecaps"
- Occupations: Former arms trafficker/smuggler; gangster; armed robber; marine
- Status: Released in 2000
- Allegiance: Mullen Gang; Winter Hill Gang; Provisional IRA
- Conviction: Racketeering / Arms Smuggling
- Criminal charges: Fixing horse races in 1979 Engineering armored car robbery in Abington, Massachusetts in support of funding the Irish Republican Army (IRA) (1990)
- Penalty: Sentenced to 37 years in prison in 1992

Patrick Joseph Nee (born December 22, 1944) is an Irish-American former mobster and Irish republican sympathizer. A former member of the Mullen Gang and the Winter Hill Gang, he is a Vietnam War veteran, and author of A Criminal and an Irishman; The Inside Story of the Boston Mob-IRA Connection.

== Early life ==
Nee was born in Ros Muc, an Irish language speaking village in Connemara, County Galway. He has recalled:

Our family had it tough in Ireland, sure, but I'm not going to tell you any of that Angela's Ashes crap to try to gain your sympathy. We might not have had many good clothes, but Ma washed them every day. There was always good food. In fact, Ma never let my brothers and I go to bed hungry. And I remember falling asleep every night to a penetrating fire that burned until early morning.

Nee's four maternal aunts had already emigrated to the US, three to Boston and one to Pittsburgh, influencing the Nee family's decision to settle in Boston. Nee's father emigrated to the U.S. in 1952 and for a year worked as a laborer. He got a house together for his family and sent his wife the passage money a year later. Their cousins drove them down to Cork, where they boarded an RMS Britannic for the trip to America, settling in South Boston, Massachusetts.

Nee became a member of the Mullen Gang at the age of 14 and fought in several turf battles. He has recalled,

My progression to crime was as easy as a baby's transition from crawling to walking. I didn't have an epiphany; I never sat down and had a soul searching experience in which I decided that being a criminal was my goal in life. It just seemed natural - there was a lot of money to be had if you spent the time planning the jobs right. The more I hung with the Mullens, the easier it was to go out on jobs. I'd simply ask if they needed another guy.

As the Vietnam War started Nee enlisted in the U.S. Marine Corps where he fought on the frontlines before returning to South Boston and continued his criminal career.

== Criminal career ==
Not long after coming home from Vietnam, his brother Peter Nee was gunned down by Kevin Daily outside a bar. Months later, Nee found the man who killed his brother. He waited outside his house late one night. He approached Daily, shooting him several times with a pistol blowing out his right lung, then he kicked him in the face and spat on him. Kevin Daily survived the attack and Patrick Nee was arrested for attempted murder. Upon seeing Patrick Nee in court, he claimed Nee was not the man who shot him. Nee was released. After his return to South Boston, in October 1966, he rejoined the Mullen gang and became one of its leaders in a turf war with the Killeen Gang. He relates, in his memoirs, that his mother would henceforth regret not throwing him off the back of the immigrant ship in 1952. In 1972, South Boston gang boss Donald Killeen was shot to death by Mullen gang enforcers Jimmy Mantville and Tommy King, outside of his home, in suburban Framingham, Massachusetts. The leadership of the Killeen faction then devolved to James J. "Whitey" Bulger.

However, Bulger and the Killeens fled the city after the murder of their boss, fearing they would be next. Instead of killing Bulger, however, Nee arranged for the dispute to be mediated by Howie Winter and Patriarca crime family captain Joseph Russo. After a meeting at Chandler's restaurant, in the South End, Boston, the two gangs joined forces, with Winter as the overall boss.

According to Nee,

Nobody talked fault, although at first it was tense while we ran down the 'who killed who' list. Whitey was a defeated warrior looking to keep as much honor as possible. He knew the Mullens had courageous, fierce men willing to die for theirs, and he was perceptive. Deep down, Whitey knew that he couldn't take over for the Killeens without cutting the Mullens in on their bookmaking and loansharking. Tommy [King] and I felt victorious, but we didn't want to gloat. The meeting lasted for six hours. We ate good steaks, chasing them down with nothing stronger than ginger ale. It was business, and contrary to media stereotype, we weren't a bunch of lowlifes who sat around drinking beer all day and all night.

Also according to Nee,

The balance of the meeting was spent forming an alliance, and by far the hardest part was deciding whom to protect. After a war, each side usually gets to protect so many people from harm. Those who aren't protected are fair game for retribution and 'shake-downs.' Everything was split down the middle. All the horses, dogs, bookmaking, and loansharking were now going to be under our mutual control. This was the beginning of our relationship. Whitey and I were now officially partners and nobody at that table could ever have possibly imagined how this treacherous f--- would treat his partners.

After Winter was convicted of fixing horse races in 1979 the leadership of the gang fell on James "Whitey" Bulger. Nee responded by relocating to Charlestown, Massachusetts and concentrating his energy on raising money and smuggling guns to the Provisional IRA. He has written that Bulger frequently urged him to cut his links to the IRA, saying that it was too great a risk for not enough profit. On July 26, 1983, Nee participated in the homicide of Arthur "Bucky" Barrett with his criminal associates at Nee's family's house at 799 East Third Street in South Boston. Barrett was a bank robber who was believed to have large amounts of untraceable cash and valuables that Nee and his gang wanted to extort from him. Barrett was good friends with brothers James and John Martorano. James Martorano used his friendship with Barrett to convince his friend to come to Nee's house to look at some stolen diamonds. Instead of diamonds, Barrett walked into Nee's house and encountered Nee and his associates armed with machine guns. Barrett gave Nee and his associates the location of some of his stolen cash. Then Barrett was led to the basement and shot in the head.

Nee and Kevin Weeks buried Barrett's body in Nee's dirt cellar. Between 1999 and 2003, US Attorneys in Boston immunized two of Nee's associates who were present with him at his house that day and thus learned the details of Barrett's murder. Despite relying on these witnesses to indict other associates who were present, the US Attorneys decided not to indict Nee or Martorano. The US Attorneys' willingness to ignore Nee's involvement in Barrett's murder has fueled speculation that Nee is a protected federal informant.

Nee remained an occasional associate throughout the years and masterminded a 1984 attempt to smuggle seven tons of AK-47 assault rifles to the Provisional IRA. In January 1984, Nee made a four-day trip to Europe with Joseph Murray and John McIntyre, meeting in Amsterdam with Michael Browne, the skipper of the Fenit-based fishing vessel the Marita Ann, before briefly visiting County Kerry and Belfast. With Bulger's assistance, the guns were loaded aboard the Valhalla, a fishing trawler from Gloucester, Massachusetts. However, the Irish Government had learned of the scheme via Sean O'Callaghan, a police informant in the IRA's Southern Command. As a result, the cargo was intercepted by a combined force of the Irish Navy and the Garda Síochána. The Valhalla's crew was arrested by U.S. Customs agents immediately after returning to Gloucester. The failure of the mission led Bulger to torture and murder John McIntyre, an American member of the Valhalla's crew who had purportedly informed on the scheme to U.S. Customs agents and had agreed to wear a wire on Bulger and Nee. Nee admitted to bringing McIntyre to the South Boston house where Bulger, Stephen Flemmi, and Kevin Weeks were waiting for him. He claims that he believed they were only going to talk to him and that he was disgusted to return later and find the trio about to bury McIntyre's corpse in the basement.

On November 30, 1984, Nee picked up McIntyre from a bar and lured him to his house with a case of beer and a promise of a party. At this time, Nee knew that McIntyre was cooperating with federal law enforcement in re the smuggling of 7.5 tons of automatic weapons, machine guns, rocket launchers, plastic explosives, bullet proof vests, and ammunition aboard the Valhalla. 17 months prior, Barrett had been lured to Nee's house and killed there. McIntyre was killed in Nee's house and buried in the cellar next to Barrett's corpse. Nee fled Boston after being informed by Bulger that federal agents were looking for him. After several years in hiding, he was arrested in 1987 and served an 18-month sentence in Federal prison. The statutory sentence he faced for possessing and smuggling those 7.5 tons of armaments was life imprisonment.

After his release, in 1989, Nee was motivated increasingly by Irish republicanism, to cut his links to Bulger. He put together a crew of his own and began planning Armored car robberies to raise money for the IRA. He was arrested by the FBI during an armored car robbery in Abington, Massachusetts on January 13, 1990; he was masked and in possession of another machine gun, which again carried a mandatory life sentence. He was sentenced to 37 years in federal prison (Register Number: 15909-038) but released on April 25, 2000. Federal sentencing guidelines prohibited early release or credit for "good behavior" in a federal prison. The US Attorney's Office in Boston has refused to explain Nee's early release and why they failed to oppose it.

In 2001, Nee provided authorities in Oklahoma with information that helped them indict Stephen Flemmi, Whitey Bulger and John Martorano on murder charges stemming from the 1981 killing of businessman Roger Wheeler.

In 2003, US Attorneys Fred Wyshak and Brian Kelly immunized Nee's associate Steven "The Rifleman" Flemmi and participated in Flemmi's debriefing. At that time, Wyshak and Kelly learned from Flemmi that Nee had participated in another homicide in January 1985. The victim, Deborah Hussey, was lured to Nee's house at 799 East Third Street in South Boston. She was strangled to death and buried in Nee's cellar, alongside Barrett and McIntyre. Wyshak and Kelly learned Nee had participated in burying another murder victim, Deborah Davis, in 1981. Wyshak and Kelly did not charge Nee in any of these crimes, nor in the Donohue and Halloran murders.

== Resources ==
- T. J. English, Paddy Whacked; The Untold Story of the Irish-American Gangster, 2005.
- Patrick Nee, A Criminal and an Irishman, 2006.
