= Killeen Gang =

Defunct Irish-American criminal gang based in Boston

- Years active: c.1950-c.1970
- Territory: Boston
- Ethnicity: Irish American
- Membership: 30-40 members and associates
- Activities: extortion, robbery, gambling, pimping, drug trafficking
- Allies: Winter Hill Gang
- Rivals: Mullen Gang

The Killeen Gang was an Irish-American Boston-based crime organization started by Donnie Killeen. At one time, the gang was led by Whitey Bulger.

Along with Bulger, Billy O'Sullivan was a notable associate. The Killeen Gang eventually combined with the Mullen Gang to become the Winter Hill Gang.
