= James McLean (mobster) =

American mobster

- McLean's September 27, 1958 mugshot
- Born: James Joseph McLean; January 26, 1930; Somerville, Massachusetts, U.S.
- Died: October 31, 1965 (aged 35); Somerville, Massachusetts, U.S.
- Cause of death: Gun shot
- Other name: Buddy McLean
- Occupation: Crime boss
- Years active: 1955–1965
- Successor: Howie Winter
- Allegiance: Winter Hill Gang

James Joseph McLean (January 26, 1930 – October 31, 1965), known as "Buddy" McLean, was an American mobster, who was the original boss of the Somerville, Massachusetts-based Winter Hill Gang during the 1960s. McLean was well known throughout the Greater Boston area as an unstoppable street fighter. He accumulated injuries including several scars on his neck and face as well as a damaged left eye. A friend of McLean once said, "He looks like a choir boy, but fights like the devil."

== Early life ==
James McLean was orphaned at a young age and adopted by an immigrant Portuguese-American family in Somerville, Massachusetts. Working as a longshoreman during his teenage years on the docks of Charlestown and East Boston, he would become close friends with future president of the International Brotherhood of Teamsters Local 25, William J. McCarthy. His best friend however, was Joseph "Joe Mac" McDonald, a very tough and feared Somerville man who was the first to organize crime on Winter Hill.

McLean began to slowly amass a formidable criminal organization due to the admiration of his ability to fight along with a strong sense of street smarts. He would eventually dominate the local underworld in northern Boston which included illegal gambling, loansharking, and truck hijackings.

== Irish gang wars ==
In early September 1961, two Winter Hill associates of McLean, and their friend, Charlestown mobster George McLaughlin rented a cottage on Salisbury Beach for a Labor Day party. Drinking with his friends throughout the day and into the late evening, McLaughlin attempted to grope one of the gangster’s girlfriends. Confronted by the two men, McLaughlin received a savage beating until losing consciousness. Unsure whether or not he was still alive, they dumped him at a nearby hospital and went to tell McLean what had happened.

McLean told them he would take care of it and had a talk with his friend, and George McLaughlin's brother, Bernard "Bernie" McLaughlin.

When McLean learned that Bernie McLaughlin wanted to take revenge and sought McLean's help in doing it, McLean told him his brother had been out of line and had the beating coming. Bernie McLaughlin stormed out in a rage. Later that night, McLean awoke to the sound of his dogs barking, and saw two men under his car. He chased the men off by firing a Luger pistol at them, and found sticks of dynamite wired to the ignition of his car. Suspecting the McLaughlins, he began stalking Bernie McLaughlin throughout Charlestown until he found him. He killed Bernie McLaughlin walking out of the Morning Glory bar in Charlestown in broad daylight and in front of almost one hundred witnesses on October 31, 1961. He was originally arrested along with Alex Petricone but the witness who picked them out later recanted and they were released. Alex Petricone, who was not a killer, was sent out to California by McLean to stay out of the gang war. Petricone started taking acting lessons, changed his name to Alex Rocco and became an actor. One of his first roles was playing Moe Greene in The Godfather movie.

McLean became an informant for the corrupt Federal Bureau of Investigation (FBI) agent H. Paul Rico. Rico was offended when he heard Charlestown gangsters refer to him and his boss, J. Edgar Hoover, as "fags" on an illegal wiretap. As a result, Rico felt animosity towards the McLaughlin gang and leaked information to members of the Winter Hill Gang which allowed them to track down and kill Charlestown gangsters.

In an attempt to kill McLean, the Charlestown gangster Ronald Dermody accidentally shot another man. Dermody then arranged a meeting with Rico in Watertown on the night of September 4, 1964. Instead of meeting with Dermody, Rico alerted McLean to the prearranged meeting place. McLean arrived and fatally shot Dermody three times as he sat in a parked car. Rico then picked up McLean at the scene and harbored him at his home in Belmont for a number of days.

== Death ==
Although he was acquitted of the murder charge, McLean went to prison for two years for illegal possession of a firearm. Leading the Winter Hill Gang against their Charlestown rivals for more than two years, McLean was shot dead by Stevie Hughes as he left the 318 Club on Broadway, Winter Hill. He was succeeded by Howie Winter.
