= Roger Wheeler (businessman) =

American businessman (1926–1981)

- Born: Roger Milton Wheeler; February 27, 1926; Boston, Massachusetts, U.S.
- Died: May 27, 1981 (aged 55); Tulsa, Oklahoma, U.S.
- Cause of death: Gunshot wound
- Resting place: Memorial Park Cemetery, Tulsa, Oklahoma
- Education: Rice University
- Occupation: Businessman
- Years active: 1943–1981
- Known for: Owner of World Jai Alai
- Spouse: Patricia Jane Wilson (m. 1946)
- Children: 6

Roger Milton Wheeler Sr. (February 27, 1926 – May 27, 1981) was an American businessman from Tulsa, Oklahoma, the former chairman of Telex Corporation, and former owner of World Jai Alai. He was murdered by members of organized crime who discovered that Wheeler had uncovered their embezzlement scheme at World Jai Alai.

== Early life ==
Roger Milton Wheeler was born in Boston, Massachusetts, in 1926, the son of Sidney Sea Wheeler and Florence Edith (née Kendall) Wheeler. He was raised in Boston and Reading, and graduated from Reading High School in 1943. After graduating, Wheeler served in the United States Navy Reserve while attending the University of Notre Dame and Rice University. He graduated from Rice in 1946 with a bachelor of science degree in engineering.

== Career ==
While still in high school, Wheeler was involved in several business ventures, including owning and operating a neighborhood newspaper and a stamp collecting service. He then started the Reading Wood Company and used a truck purchased on credit to haul the product from Vermont for resale in Reading.

Wheeler worked for Gulf Oil and Standard Oil in Texas, and in 1946 relocated to Tulsa to work for a company that produced anodes for use in the petroleum industry. In 1949, he started his anode production enterprise, Standard Magnesium and Chemical. Fifteen years later, Wheeler sold Standard Magnesium for $10 million (more than $70 million in 2021).

In the mid-1960s, Wheeler and a group of investors purchased Telex Corp., a maker of hearing aids, speakers, and other sound equipment. Wheeler was the largest shareholder, and served as chairman and chief executive officer. Under his leadership, Telex branched out to the manufacture of computer accessories, including printers and tape drives. Telex grew to employ 5,000 people in the Tulsa area, and Wheeler was a multimillionaire.

== Death ==
On May 27, 1981, Wheeler, 55, was murdered in his car while he was preparing to leave Southern Hills Country Club in Tulsa. Subsequent investigations revealed that Wheeler was killed after uncovering an embezzlement scheme at one of his other business ventures, World Jai Alai in Miami, Florida. After retiring from the FBI, H. Paul Rico took a job as head of security for the jai alai organization. While he was head of security, Rico's former informants Whitey Bulger and Steve Flemmi of Boston's Winter Hill Gang ran a skimming operation that embezzled $10,000 per week from World Jai Alai's parking lot revenues. Upon discovering the theft, Wheeler investigated; this created major problems for Bulger's gang, and led to between four and six murders, two of which remain unsolved.

On March 14, 2001, three members of the Winter Hill Gang—Bulger, Flemmi and Johnny Martorano—were indicted for Wheeler's murder; two other alleged co-conspirators were already dead. In a plea bargain, Martorano confessed to around twenty murders by the gang, including Wheeler's. He was given a 15-year sentence, but was released in 2007 after serving six years. Flemmi also pleaded guilty to the murder of Wheeler and others and received a life sentence. Bulger fled to avoid prosecution and was on the FBI Ten Most Wanted Fugitives list from August 19, 1999 until his capture on June 22, 2011. In 2003, Rico was also indicted for Wheeler's murder. He pleaded not guilty and died of natural causes while in custody awaiting trial.

== In popular culture ==
Wheeler's case was covered in the first-ever episode of long-running investigative show Unsolved Mysteries in January 1987. In the Whitey Bulger biopic Black Mass (2015), Wheeler is portrayed by David De Beck.
