= Winter Hill Gang =

American organized crime gang

- Founded: 1961; 65 years ago
- Founder: James "Buddy" McLean
- Founding location: Somerville, Massachusetts, United States
- Years active: 1961–2000
- Territory: Primarily Greater Boston, with additional territory throughout Massachusetts and Connecticut, as well as South Florida
- Ethnicity: Predominantly Irish American, as well as Italian American, Jewish American, and Portuguese American
- Membership (est.): 30 members (1975) and 100 associates
- Activities: Racketeering, gambling, loansharking, extortion, drug trafficking, weapons trafficking, race fixing, robbery, theft, fraud, money laundering, corruption, bribery, assault, and murder
- Allies: Campbell brothers; Detroit Partnership; Genovese crime family; Killeen Gang; Mullen Gang; Patriarca crime family (under Raymond Patriarca); Philadelphia crime family; Provisional IRA
- Rivals: Charlestown Gang; Patriarca crime family (specifically the Angiulo brothers)

The Winter Hill Gang was a federation of Irish-American organized crime figures in the Boston, Massachusetts, area. The organization itself derives its name from the Winter Hill neighborhood of Somerville, Massachusetts, north of Boston. The Winter Hill Gang was given its name in the 1970s by journalists at the Boston Herald. The gang formed in Somerville under the leadership of Howard "Howie" Winter and James "Buddy" McLean. It was generally considered an Irish mob organization, with most gang members and the leadership consisting predominantly of Irish-Americans, although some notable members, such as Stephen Flemmi and Johnny Martorano, were of Italian-American descent.

After vanquishing the McLaughlin Gang of Charlestown, then absorbing the remnants of the Mullen and Killeen gangs of South Boston following a series of Irish gang wars, the Winter Hill Gang was most influential from 1965, under the rule of McLean and Winter, to the 1979 takeover led by James "Whitey" Bulger. Twenty-one members and associates were indicted by federal prosecutors in 1979. Subsequently, Bulger and Flemmi seized control of the gang, relocating its headquarters to South Boston. Several other infamous Boston gangsters, such as Joseph "Joe Mac" McDonald, Patrick "Pat" Nee, Vincent "Jimmy the Bear" Flemmi, and Kevin Weeks, were among its members.

The Winter Hill Gang was the second most powerful criminal organization in New England, behind only the Patriarca crime family of Providence, Rhode Island. The gang was involved with most typical organized crime-related activities, including drug trafficking, gambling, and loan sharking, as well as fixing horse races throughout the northeastern United States, and shipping weapons to the Provisional Irish Republican Army (IRA).

== History ==
=== The Irish Gang Wars ===
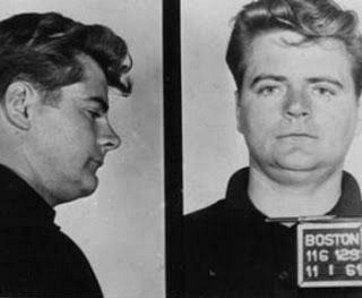
Winter Hill Gang founder James "Buddy" McLean in a 1961 mugshot

The Winter Hill Gang was founded in 1961 by James "Buddy" McLean and Howard "Howie" Winter, who were partners in a trucking company, when they became involved in illegal gambling, numbers running, bookmaking and loansharking in the Winter Hill neighborhood of Somerville, Massachusetts, a northwestern suburb of Boston. The Winter Hill Gang co-existed in relative peace with the McLaughlin Gang from the Boston neighborhood of Charlestown, led by Bernie, Georgie and Edward "Punchy" McLaughlin, until an incident at Salisbury Beach on Labor Day weekend 1961. While at a party, Georgie McLaughlin made an advance on the girlfriend of Winter Hill Gang member Alexander "Bobo" Petricone, Jr. McLaughlin was subsequently beaten unconscious by members of the Winter Hill Gang and was dumped outside the local hospital. Bernie McLaughlin went to see McLean and demanded that he hand over the members of the gang who beat his brother. McLean refused. The McLaughlins took this refusal as an insult and attempted to wire a bomb to McLean's wife's car.

In retaliation, McLean shot and killed Bernie McLaughlin coming out of the "Morning Glory" bar in Charlestown on October 31, 1961. This was the start of Boston's first Irish Gang War. McLean and Petricone, his alleged getaway driver, were arrested and charged with McLaughlin's murder but, as none of the numerous witnesses to the killing were willing to testify, they were released. Petricone fled the Boston area during the war and became an actor under the name Alex Rocco.

Although the McLaughlin brothers had a larger and more well-established gang, the Winter Hill Gang proved more dynamic and resourceful, recruiting killers such as Stephen "the Rifleman" Flemmi, Francis "Cadillac Frank" Salemme, and Joseph "the Animal" Barboza. Their rivals, meanwhile, suffered another significant setback when Georgie McLaughlin was sent to prison for life after shooting and killing a bank teller during an argument at a christening in an incident unrelated to the gang war.

The Winter Hill Gang made their first attempt on the life of the remaining brother, "Punchy" McLaughlin, after being tipped off that he was in the Hotel Beaconsfield, shotgunning him at point-blank range when he entered a car and blowing his jaw off. He survived after being rushed to the Beth Israel Hospital. In the second attempt, McLaughlin was ambushed by Winter, who was armed with a scoped .308 Winchester rifle, along with McLean, Flemmi and Salemme, who each carried a machine gun, as he arrived at a girlfriend's house in Weston. Winter blew McLaughlin's hand off with a rifle shot, but McLaughlin was able to flee and escaped after a car chase along Route 128. The Winter Hill Gang finally succeeded in killing McLaughlin when they shot him while he waited for a bus in the West Roxbury section of Boston on October 20, 1965. The one-handed McLaughlin was carrying a pistol in a satchel but was unable to draw the gun quickly enough to save himself.

Eleven days later, on October 31, 1965, McLean was shot and killed by one of the last survivors of the McLaughlin Gang, Steve Hughes, as he exited the 318 Club in Winter Hill. Winter then assumed control of the Winter Hill Gang. A year later, in 1966, the last two associates of the McLaughlin Gang, brothers Connie and Steve Hughes were killed, allegedly by Salemme. Connie Hughes was ambushed on the Northeast Expressway after leaving an afterhours club on May 25, 1966, and Stevie Hughes was killed along with an associate in a drive-by shooting on Route 114 in Middleton on September 23, 1966. The murders of the Hughes brothers marked the conclusion of the first Irish Gang War, with the Winter Hill Gang victorious despite the death of McLean. By the time the war finally ended, more than 60 men had been murdered throughout Boston and the surrounding area. Irish gang killings had become so prevalent in Boston that the obituaries sections in newspapers were jokingly referred to as "the Irish sports pages".

The second Irish Gang War in Boston began in the mid-1960s and was contested between the Mullen Gang and the Killeen Gang. Unlike the Winter Hill and McLaughlin gangs, which were city-wide organizations, the Mullens and Killeens were confined to South Boston and their feud essentially amounted to a local turf war. The Mullens were a loose-knit street gang with around 60 members, while their rivals were a smaller but more organized group led by the Killeen brothers, Donnie, Kenny and Eddie. The younger Mullens, whose ranks included many Vietnam War veterans, began encroaching on the territory of the Killeens, who had been the dominant gang in South Boston for two decades.

The Mullen–Killeen feud escalated significantly after an incident in 1969 in which Kenny Killeen bit off the nose of Mullen Gang member Mickey Dwyer in a bar fight at the Transit Café. Afterwards, a murder attempt was made on Mullen leader Patrick "Pat" Nee, whose gang retaliated by killing Killeen enforcer Billy O'Sullivan on March 28, 1971. The gang war nominally ended when Killeen leader Donald Killeen was gunned down outside his home in Framingham on May 13, 1972. Killeen's death left James "Whitey" Bulger in charge of the gang. Outnumbered, the Killeens agreed to negotiate with the Mullens, and a meeting between the gangs, which was mediated by Winter, was held at Chandler's bar in Boston's South End. The Mullens and Killeens agreed to cease hostilities and consolidate under the leadership of Winter.

=== The Indian War ===
Following the elimination of the McLaughlin gang and the consolidation of the Mullen and Killeen gangs, the Winter Hill Gang controlled Boston's Irish mob rackets. During the 1970s, the gang's most prominent members were Winter, Flemmi, Bulger, John "the Executioner" Martorano, Joseph "Joe Mac" McDonald, and James "Jimmy" Sims. The gangsters used the office of Marshall Motors, a large body shop on Marshall Street in Somerville, as their social club and headquarters.

In January 1973, the Winter Hill Gang entered into a partnership with the Patriarca crime family of Providence, Rhode Island to control gambling rackets in Boston. Shortly afterwards, Gennaro "Jerry" Angiulo, the Patriarca family underboss and head of the family's Boston faction, enlisted the Winter Hill Gang for assistance in a war against a small gang based in Somerville led by Alfred "Indian Al" Notarangeli. The Notarangeli gang had begun extorting bookmakers who were under the protection of the Patriarca family, and while on furlough from prison in 1972, Notarangeli murdered one of Angiulo's bookies, Paulie Folino. The Winter Hill Gang subsequently began exterminating members of Notarangeli's gang. Explaining how the Winter Hill Gang differed from the Patriarca family in their methods of killing, Flemmi described the gang as "hunters" who tracked down their targets, while the Mafia would wait, possibly for years, for their intended victim to show up on Hanover Street to kill them.

On March 8, 1973, Michael Milano, a bartender, was machine gunned to death in the Brighton neighborhood of Boston after Martorano mistook him for Notarangeli. Milano's friend, Louis Lapiana, and Lapiana's girlfriend, Dianne Sussman, were also wounded in the shooting. The Winter Hill Gang made another attempt to kill Notarangeli on March 19, 1973, when the car in which he was traveling was fired upon by Martorano and Winter in Boston's North End. Notarangeli survived unharmed. Two of his associates, Frank Capizzi and Hugh "Sonny" Shields, were injured. Notarangeli's driver, Albert "Bud" Plummer, died from his wounds, on March 23, 1973.

On March 24, 1973, William "Billy" O'Brien was killed when Martorano strafed his car with machine gun fire on Morrissey Boulevard in an attempt to murder another Notarangeli gang member, Ralph DeMasi, who survived being shot eight times. Another of Notarangeli's associates, James Leary, was shot dead while in hiding in Fort Lauderdale, Florida, on April 3, 1973. On April 18, 1973, Joseph "Indian Joe" Notorangeli, the brother of Al Notorangeli, was shot and killed by Martorano in a restaurant in Medford Square.

After his gang was decimated by four murders, with several other members wounded, Notarangeli fled to the West Coast before returning to Boston in late 1973 in an attempt to make peace with Angiulo. Using Winter as a mediator, Notarangeli paid a $50,000 peace offering to Angiulio, who shared the money with the Winter Hill Gang. On February 22, 1974, Notarangeli was shot in the head by Martorano and left in the trunk of his car.

=== Leadership change ===
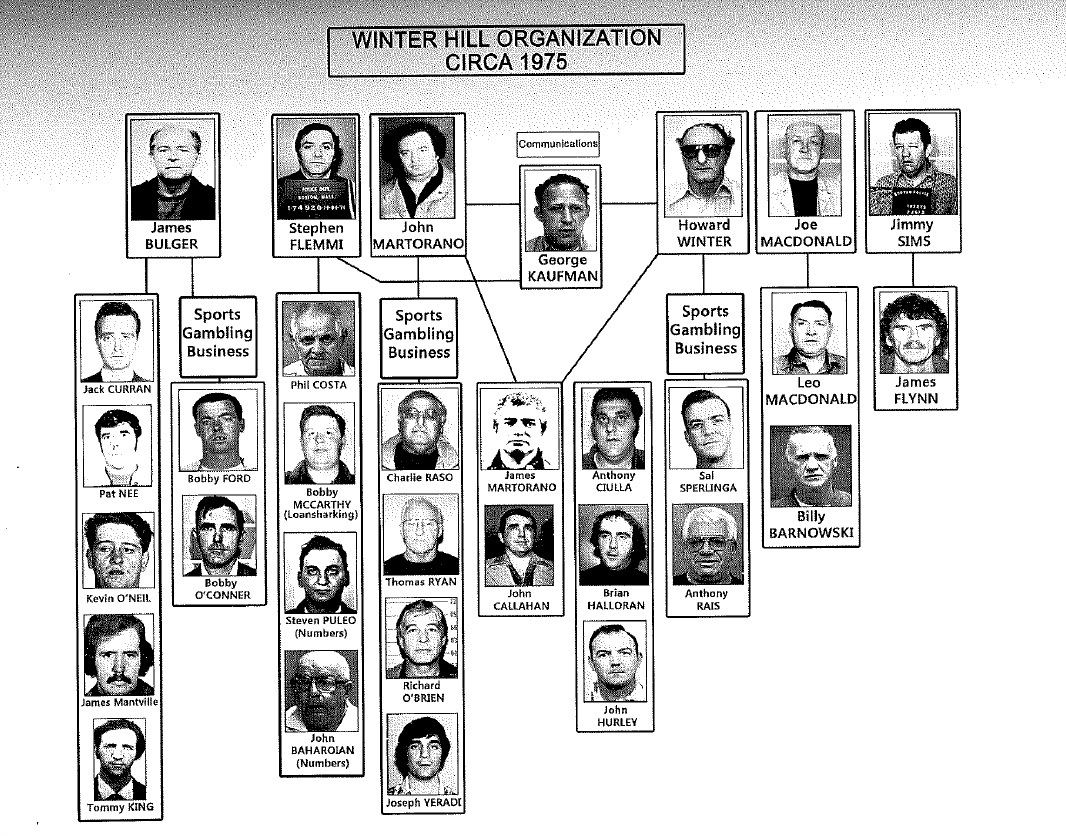
DEA chart of the Winter Hill Gang structure circa 1975

Following the merger of the Mullen and Killeen gangs into the Winter Hill Gang, several former Mullen members resented the amalgamation and continued to seek revenge against their former Killeen rivals. Consequently, Winter sanctioned the murders of any members who were deemed subversive to his leadership. Paul "Paulie" McGonagle, who sought retaliation against former Killeen Gang member Bulger for the killing of his brother and who rivaled Bulger for control of rackets in South Boston, was murdered on November 20, 1974. His body was buried at Tenean Beach in Dorchester. Another former Mullen gangster, Tommy King, was killed on November 5, 1975 after a dispute with Bulger. King was lured to his death when the gang ostensibly recruited him to take part in a hit team who were purportedly being assembled to kill Allan "Suitcase" Fidler, an associate of the boxer and bar owner Eddie "the Buldog" Connors, who the Winter Hill Gang had killed earlier that year. King was buried near the Neponset River in Quincy.

The Winter Hill Gang expanded into Lowell in the early 1970s, taking control of sports betting and loan sharking in the city and its surrounding towns in the Merrimack Valley. The gang was quite proficient at murdering rival mobsters in order to take over their rackets. But once they gained control, they had no idea how to run them. They learned the lesson of their gang's disastrous foray into gambling after wiping out Notarangeli's crew. In what should have been a fabulously profitable illicit gambling enterprise, the gang lost it. As the years went by, Bulger and Flemmi lost interest in running any kind of gambling operation. They would eventually only provide protection for bookmakers, drug dealers and truck hijackers. By 1975, Winter and Martorano were going broke. Eventually they had to go to Angiulo to borrow money. To make the weekly payments, they began going into businesses with people they didn't know and couldn't trust. These activities included rigging horse races and drug trafficking.

During the mid-1970s, the Winter Hill Gang became involved in a dispute with the Patriarca family over the placement of vending machines around the Greater Boston area after a vending machine company which paid the Mafia $50,000 per month to house its machines in bars around Boston began putting its machines in Winter Hill Gang-controlled bars in Somerville, Charlestown, South Boston, Roxbury, and Dorchester. By 1975, the Winter Hill Gang was allegedly on the verge of a mob war with the Patriarca family. The Organized Crime Program of the Boston division of the Federal Bureau of Investigation (FBI), which focused on the Patriarca family as its main priority and considered the Winter Hill Gang a lesser threat, exploited the underworld tensions by recruiting Bulger and Flemmi into the FBI's Top Echelon Informant program. Bulger and Flemmi began providing information on the Mafia in exchange for protection by the FBI.

The Winter Hill Gang became involved in a horse race-fixing scheme when Winter and Martorano partnered with Anthony "Fat Tony" Ciulla, a hustler from the North End of Boston, and his associate, Billy Barnoski, beginning in 1974. The gangsters would successfully place large wagers with bookmakers throughout the country on unfancied race horses after swaying betting odds in their favor by bribing and threatening jockeys and doping horses. The Winter Hill Gang made millions of dollars by fixing races along the East Coast, and became the second most influential crime group in New England, behind only the Patriarca family. The gang partnered with mobsters from the Genovese, Bruno and Zerilli crime families in infiltrating race courses in Massachusetts, New York, Pennsylvania, Maryland, and Michigan.

It was the Winter Hill Gang's decision to involve outsiders with their business that led to their downfall. After being arrested, Ciulla began cooperating with federal authorities and informing on the gang. In February 1979, 21 members and associates, including Winter, were indicted by federal prosecutors after being implicated by former business partners in connection with a million-dollar horse race-fixing scheme. Bulger's and Flemmi's status as confidential FBI informants kept them from being indicted. When Winter and the rest of the Somerville crew were all sent to prison, Bulger and Flemmi were able to assume control as the new leaders of the Winter Hill Gang.

=== Bulger era ===
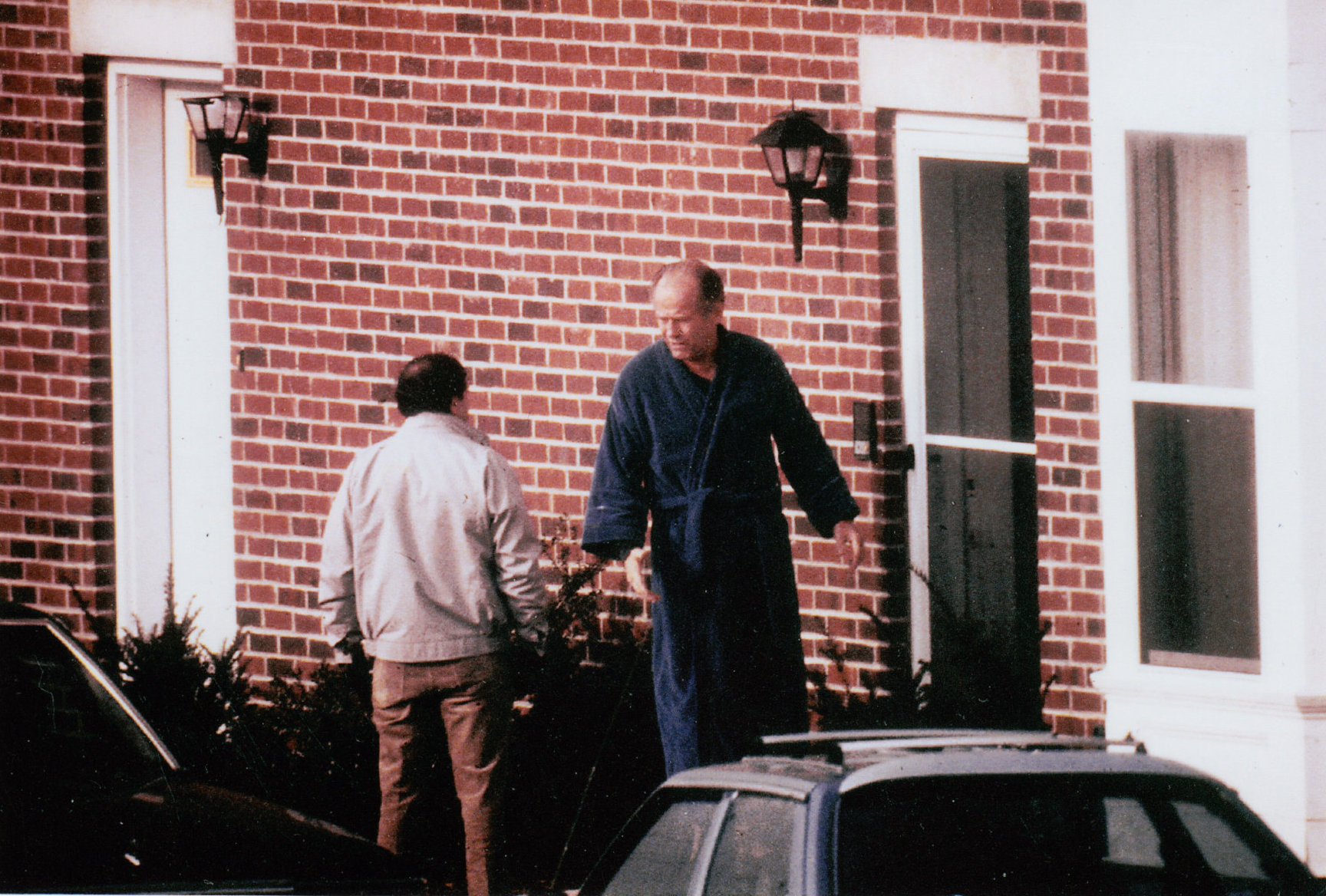
FBI surveillance photograph of the former Winter Hill Gang hierarchy in the 1980s. Mob boss Whitey Bulger (right) and lieutenant Stephen Flemmi.

In 1979 and 1980, Bulger used Lancaster Foreign Motors, a parking garage in Boston's West End owned by Winter Hill Gang associate George Kaufman, as the gang's headquarters, where he openly met with and accepted payments from associates. After putting the garage under surveillance for six months, the Massachusetts State Police were granted a warrant to plant covert listening devices on the premises in the summer of 1980. Bulger's allies in the FBI alerted him to the police surveillance, and he and Flemmi subsequently began operating from South Boston. In November 1980, Bulger and Flemmi helped the FBI plant a bug in the headquarters of Jerry Angiulo in the North End. Angiulo and a number of his associates were indicted on federal charges in 1983 and later convicted, allowing the Winter Hill Gang to take over the rackets that had been controlled by the Patriarca family.

The Winter Hill Gang infiltrated the jai alai industry when John "Jack" Callahan, an accountant and aspiring gangster from Medford who was acquainted with Bulger and Flemmi, became the president of World Jai-Alai, a parimutuel betting company based in Miami and Hartford, Connecticut. Callahan recruited H. Paul Rico, a corrupt former FBI agent from Boston who had retired to Miami, as head of security at World Jai-Alai, and also enlisted the help of Martorano, who had fled to South Florida to avoid being arrested in the race-fixing scheme. With the assistance of Rico, the gang "skimmed" $10,000 per week from the company. In 1979, the Tulsa, Oklahoma businessman Roger Wheeler bought World Jai-Alai. Suspecting the embezzlement scheme, Wheeler fired Callahan and World Jai-Alai's three top financial officers, replaced them with own people in key positions, and began an audit in 1980. Fearing that Wheeler was on the verge of reporting the skimming operation to authorities, Bulger ordered his murder. Martorano shot and killed Wheeler outside a Tulsa country club on May 27, 1981. After Bulger and Flemmi were tipped off by their FBI handler, John "Zip" Connolly, that Callahan was being sought by the FBI for questioning in Wheeler's murder, Martorano shot Callahan dead on July 31, 1982 and left his body in the trunk of his car at Miami International Airport.

The Winter Hill Gang played a role in the Provisional Irish Republican Army (IRA)'s paramilitary actions in the late 20th century. In his novel, A Criminal and an Irishman, Nee detailed the gang's involvement with the IRA. He said that Bulger "loved being associated with the IRA and the cause of Irish Freedom". He went on to say that Bulger's association with the IRA gave him a sense of legitimacy. Nee played an active role in raising funds and smuggling weapons to the IRA. In September 1984, the Valhalla, a fishing boat, left Boston harbor loaded with weapons. The vessel was seized by two Irish Naval Service ships upon arriving in Ireland having been sold out by an Irish informant, Sean O'Callaghan. The Winter Hill Gang also had a plot spoiled by a local fisherman John McIntyre who they had partnered with but who went to the police after hearing word of a gun-running mission. The authorities attempted to use McIntyre as an informant against Bulger. However, Bulger received information from FBI agent Connolly that the fisherman had gone to the police. Connolly provided McIntyre's whereabouts and Bulger along with his right-hand man Flemmi tortured and killed him.

During the 1980s, Bulger's closest criminal associates included Nee, Kevin Weeks, and Kevin O'Neil. By 1991, even as Bulger's criminal career was winding down, he remained the undisputed mob boss. His associate Weeks was not considered a threat, and neither were Jim Mulvey, even though he suspected Bulger of being an FBI informant, Billy Shea, John "Red" Shea, Tim "TC" Connolly, Pat Linskey, Eddie MacKenzie, Paul "Polecat" Moore or John Cherry. Boston journalist Howie Carr commented, "They hadn't really been gangsters so much as they'd been ex-boxers and bar-room brawlers who had become cocaine dealers." One problem that arose with the gang was that they enjoyed partaking in their own vices. Like their customers, they spent afternoons in the fall drinking beer and watching professional football on television, often doubling up wagers on late West Coast games as they desperately tried to break even and chased their losses. Despite the above unsubstantiated claims of the gang's apparent inability to successfully run organized crime rackets, Bulger generated well over $25 million in racketeering proceeds alone throughout his criminal career, according to paperwork filed in federal court.

Under Bulger's leadership, the Winter Hill Gang took control of the narcotics trade in South Boston by demanding tribute from and imposing rules upon neighborhood drug dealers. The gang also controlled much of the loansharking and protection rackets in the Boston area, extorting money from bookmakers and legitimate businesses. Bulger and Flemmi escaped prosecution by the Drug Enforcement Administration (DEA) throughout narcotics investigations during 1984–1985 and 1989–1990 due to the protection they received from the FBI. In August 1990, 51 Winter Hill Gang-affiliated drug dealers were arrested at the end of an investigation by the DEA, the Boston Police Department, and the Massachusetts State Police. The investigation—which targeted three separate drug rings, led by Shea, Moore, and Hobart Willis, each of whom operated under the umbrella of the Winter Hill Gang—effectively ended the gang's drug operations.

Flemmi acted as the Winter Hill Gang's liaison to the Patriarca family.

=== Downfall ===
Bulger and Flemmi were "closed", or terminated, as informants shortly after Connolly's retirement from the FBI in 1990, although the Winter Hill Gang's illegal activities continued.

In 1998, during a trial for racketeering and fixing horse races, Steve Flemmi and Whitey Bulger were revealed under disclosure to be FBI informants. Steve Flemmi and Whitey Bulger were implicated in many unlawful activities, including murder, but were never brought to justice due to their FBI handlers diverting their guilt onto others in the gang or various other gangs of the time. They were first handled by Special Agent H. Paul Rico and then later by SA John "Zip" Connolly. In addition to providing details on other gangs, Flemmi and Bulger relayed information on fellow members of the Winter Hill Gang to the FBI. When they had nothing to report, they would make up information to ensure that they were seen to be of high value to the agency.

== Historical leadership ==
=== Boss ===
- 1961–1965 – James "Buddy" McLean – Murdered on October 31, 1965.
- 1965–1978 – Howard "Howie" Winter – Jailed in 1978, released in 2002, died in 2020
- 1978–1995 – James "Whitey" Bulger – One of the most infamous Irish Mob bosses. Fled Boston in 1994 due to a pending federal indictment. He was on the FBI's Ten Most Wanted list until his arrest in Santa Monica, California, on June 22, 2011. He had a $2 million bounty on his head. Killed in his cell at age 89 the night after he was transferred to USP Hazleton on October 30, 2018.
- 1995–2000 – Kevin Weeks – Was Bulger's lieutenant, he was arrested on November 17, 1999 and became a cooperating witness in January 2000; released from federal prison on February 4, 2005, he wrote a book in 2006 entitled Brutal: The Untold Story of My Life Inside Whitey Bulger's Irish Mob

== Former members and associates ==
- William "Billy" Barnoski – Barnoski was a Winter Hill Gang enforcer. He was convicted in 1984 on federal charges related to illegal sports betting. Upon his release from prison, Barnoski was given permission by the gang to take over the operations of Lowell bookmaker John "Jackie" McDermott. In May 1987, Barnoski, McDermott and 15 others were indicted on federal gambling-racketeering charges stemming from an illegal gambling operation. After learning that McDermott had begun cooperating against him, Barnoski killed John McDermott and wounded his son, Peter McDermott, at their home on May 10, 1988. He was convicted of murder and attempted murder, and sentenced to life in prison on June 27, 1989. Barnoski developed a brain tumor in prison. He died from MRSA and sepsis at a Leominster hospital aged 74 on September 9, 2013.
- James Joseph "Whitey" Bulger – Bulger was born on September 3, 1929 and grew up in South Boston. He was sent to federal prison for bank robbery in 1956, serving part of his sentence at Alcatraz, before being released in 1965. Bulger became an enforcer for the South Boston crime boss Donald Killeen, head of the Killeen Gang. After Killeen was gunned down by the rival Mullen Gang in 1972, Bulger was consolidated into the Winter Hill Gang. In 1975, acting partly on the recommendation of Stephen Flemmi, Bulger became an FBI informant, providing information on the Patriarca crime family in exchange for protection from the FBI. Reporting to Special Agent John Connolly and his supervisor, John Morris, Bulger and Flemmi were promoted to the status of "Top Echelon" informant. In 1979, Bulger and Flemmi were omitted from a federal horse race-fixing indictment which resulted in the imprisonment of Winter Hill Gang boss Howard Winter, allowing the duo to take control of the gang.
- John Bernard "Jack" Callahan – Callahan was a corrupt businessman, accountant, gambling executive and Winter Hill Gang associate from Medford. After graduating from Yale University, he worked for several prominent accounting firms in Boston. In December 1974, Callahan became the president and chief executive officer of World Jai Alai (WJA), a Florida-based sports betting enterprise which operated jai alai frontons in Miami, Tampa, Ocala, and Fort Pierce. He recruited several Bostonians into WJA, including the corrupt retired FBI agent H. Paul Rico, who he hired as head of security. Callahan was also a close associate of John Martorano, who was living in South Florida as a fugitive, and acted as a gang conduit by ferrying money from George Kaufman in Boston to Martorano in Florida. With the assistance of his Boston associates, Callahan implemented a scheme which allowed the Winter Hill Gang and its leaders, James Bulger and Stephen Flemmi, to skim over $1 million per year from WJA. In early 1976, Callahan applied to Connecticut authorities for permission to build a WJA fronton in Hartford, prompting state governor Ella Grasso to order an investigation into WJA's executives by state prosecutors and the Connecticut State Police. During surveillance by investigators, Callahan was seen in the company of hoodlums including Tom McNeeley, Vincent Solomonte, Brian Halloran and James Martorano at the Playboy Club and Chandler's, a nightclub owned by Howie Winter, in Boston. In March 1976, Callahan resigned as WJA president after his gaming license was revoked by Connecticut gaming regulators due to his associations with organized crime figures. The Winter Hill Gang's embezzlement scheme at WJA continued even after Callahan left the company, however. In 1979, Tulsa, Oklahoma businessman Roger Wheeler acquired WJA, with a stipulation of the purchase requiring that Richard P. Donovan, the incumbent WJA president and a business partner of Callahan, remain as president. Wheeler discovered financial irregularities at the company and began an audit in 1980 after firing WJA's senior financial officers and replacing them with own people. Fearing that the embezzlement scheme would be uncovered, Callahan, with Donovan and Rico, unsuccessfully tried to regain control of WJA by buying it from Wheeler. When they failed to agree terms with Wheeler, Callahan conspired to have him killed and buy the company from his widow. Callahan offered John Martorano $50,000 to kill Wheeler, and agreed to hire the Winter Hill Gang to protect WJA's Connecticut operations from interference by the New York Mafia with a $10,000 per week skim from the frontons' parking lot and concession proceeds, to which Martorano, Bulger and Flemmi agreed. On May 27, 1981, Martorano shot and killed Wheeler outside a Tulsa country club.
- Phil Costa – Costa was an underling and gofer of Stephen Flemmi who acted as a bagman and tended bar at afterhours clubs. On at least one occasion during the 1980s, he delivered quicklime to Flemmi and James Bulger as they buried a murder victim in a South Boston home. Costa died in 1999.
- Nicholas V. "Nick" Femia – Femia was an enforcer for Joseph Barboza's East Boston Gang and a veteran of the 1960s Boston gang wars. In 1966, he was arrested by the Boston police along with two others after they were stopped while traveling in a car containing an M1 Garand rifle, a .45 calibre pistol and a knife. Femia briefly served as a bodyguard for Winter Hill Gang leaders James Bulger and Stephen Flemmi. He was a prime suspect in the Blackfriars massacre of 1978. After Femia joined the gang, Bulger dictated a report to his FBI handler John Connolly absolving Femia of the Blackfriars murders. When Bulger fired Femia months later, he ordered Connolly to file a new report stating that Femia had indeed been involved in the massacre. He was indicted for the murders in 1979 but was never tried because a principal witness in the case was charged with perjury. Femia was shot dead at the age of 43 during an attempted robbery at an East Boston body shop on December 16, 1983.
- Stephen Joseph "The Rifleman" Flemmi – Flemmi was born on June 9, 1934 and raised in the Roxbury neighborhood of Boston. He was the younger brother of Vincent Flemmi. Flemmi was affiliated with the Patriarca crime family and the Winter Hill Gang. He became an FBI informant in the mid-1960s, providing information on the Patriarca family to Special Agent H. Paul Rico, and was upgraded to "Top Echelon" informant status in 1967. In 1969, Flemmi became a fugitive after being tipped off by Rico about incoming indictments against him and his original partner in crime, Frank Salemme, stemming from a car bombing they had carried out together. He returned to Boston in 1974, forming a partnership with James Bulger, who also became an FBI informant the following year. Special Agent John Connolly became the handler of Flemmi and Bulger. In 1979, Winter Hill Gang boss Howard Winter and others were indicted in a federal horse race-fixing case. Due to the influence of Connolly and his FBI supervisor, John Morris, Flemmi and Bulger were left out of the indictment and were able to assume leadership of the gang. While Bulger became a fugitive in 1995, Flemmi was arrested and charged with racketeering and extortion. He became a government witness. In 2003, Flemmi pleaded guilty to 10 murders and was sentenced to life in prison, although the plea deal spared him the death penalty.
- Vincent James "Jimmy the Bear" Flemmi — The older brother of Stephen Flemmi, Vincent Flemmi was a hitman and FBI informant. He was a fugitive for three years after escaping prison in 1975. Flemmi died of a drug overdose in Norfolk State Prison on October 16, 1979.
- James P. "Jimmy" Flynn – Flynn was a Winter Hill Gang associate from Somerville. He was wrongfully implicated in the May 1982 double murder of Brian Halloran and Michael Donahue. James Bulger had committed the killings while wearing a brown wig which made him resemble Flynn, and the dying Halloran incorrectly identified Flynn as his shooter. Flynn was acquitted of murder charges in 1986. He became the transportation coordinator for Teamsters Local 25, working in the film industry. In June 2000, Flynn's Weymouth home was raided by federal agents, but he was not charged. Flynn died on September 12, 2022, at the age of 88.
- Edward Brian "Balloonhead" Halloran — Halloran was born in Medford on July 23, 1940. He was a minor associate of the Winter Hill Gang and the Patriarca crime family who operated as an enforcer and cocaine dealer. In the early hours of October 13, 1981, Halloran accompanied Patriarca mobster John Salemme to a meeting with George Pappas, a drug dealer who had defrauded a cocaine/marijuana ring jointly controlled by the Winter Hill Gang and Patriarca family, at the Four Seas Chinese restaurant in Boston's Chinatown. During the meeting, Halloran fatally shot Pappas through the eye. Charged with first-degree murder and released on $50,000 bail, Halloran survived two attempted shootings by the Mafia before he began cooperating with the FBI in January 1982, requesting immunity and protection in return. The FBI initially moved him and his family to a home on Cape Cod for security. Although he provided the FBI with information on two murders committed by the Winter Hill Gang (Louis Litif and Roger Wheeler), prosecutor Jeremiah T. O'Sullivan turned down the FBI's request to have Halloran placed in the Federal Witness Protection Program. To protect their informants, FBI agents John Morris and John Connolly told James Bulger and Stephen Flemmi that they had been implicated in two murders by Halloran, who was released from FBI protection after becoming noncompliant. On May 11, 1982, Bulger, along with an unidentified accomplice, killed Halloran in a drive-by shooting outside Anthony's Pier 4 restaurant in South Boston. An acquaintance of Halloran, Michael Donahue, was also killed in the attack.
- John T. Hurley – Hurley was a minor associate of the Charlestown and Winter Hill gangs. In 1966, he survived being shot in a barroom. In 1982, Hurley inadvertently tipped off gang boss James Bulger to the whereabouts of Brian Halloran, who had gone into hiding after becoming an FBI informant, resulting in Bulger killing Halloran hours later.
- George Kaufman – Kaufman was a senior member of the Winter Hill Gang. He served as the gang's liaison to the Patriarca family and to Boston's network of Jewish bookmakers. Kaufman owned a series of garages, including those on Marshall Street in Somerville and Lancaster Street in Boston's West End, which were used as Winter Hill Gang headquarters. The gang used Kaufman's Brookline home to house a stockpile of weapons until the late 1980s, when the cache was moved the Stephen Flemmi's parents' home in South Boston. On January 10, 1995, Kaufman was indicted along with six other gangsters on federal racketeering, extortion and loansharking charges. Mortally ill, Kaufman died, aged 66, in April 1995.
- Frank James LePere – LePere was born in Boston on January 30, 1944. He was a major drug trafficker who operated under the protection of the Winter Hill Gang. LePere was one of the biggest narcotics dealers in New England. On May 29, 1978, LePere kidnapped Michael J. Romanelli, who worked for another major marijuana dealer, Donald J. Steinberg, after Romanelli used LePere's pier in Plymouth to unload 30 tons of marijuana without LePere's permission. After being held for ransom at a Marshfiled apartment for five days, Romanelli was released when LePere received $500,000 from Steinberg's organization. Beginning in 1979, LePere paid James Bulger and Stephen Flemmi for guaranteed protection from Patriarca crime family drug lord Salvatore Michael Caruana. He also bribed David P. Twomey, a federal prosecutor with the New England Organized Crime Strike Force, for information on investigations and pending indictments. Twomey was the lead prosecutor in the Strike Force's investigation into a drug ring headed by LePere, which imported marijuana from Colombia into Maine, Vermont, Rhode Island, New Hampshire, Massachusetts and South Carolina. A warning from Twomey allowed LePere to flee to upstate New York before he was indicted on drug importation charges on December 8, 1981. LePere remained at large until he was arrested by the DEA near Lake George at Kattskill Bay, New York on November 2, 1984. He pleaded guilty in June 1985 to smuggling 145 tons of marijuana into the United States and became a government witness, providing information which led to the prosecution of Twomey on bribery charges. LePere was sentenced on July 18, 1985 to five years in federal prison. He also agreed to forfeit to the government $1.25 million in real estate and $1.6 million in cash. LePere was released in November 1987 after serving 30 months. He then relocated to Florida, where he died on January 30, 2021, aged 77.
- James "Jimmy" Martorano – James Martorano was the younger brother of John Martorano. In 1976, he was convicted of loansharking and sentenced to ten years in federal prison. While imprisoned, Martorano was indicted in 1979 along with twenty other Winter Hill Gang members and associates on federal race-fixing charges relating to the fixing of horse races during the mid-1970s. He was convicted in 1980. Martorano later became a "made" member and capo in the Patriarca crime family. In 1995, he was indicted along with the leaders of the Patriarca family and the Winter Hill Gang on federal racketeering charges.
- John Vincent "The Executioner" Martorano – Martorano was born on December 13, 1940 and grew up in Milton. He was the older brother of James Martorano. Martorano joined the Winter Hill Gang in 1972, becoming a senior figure and prominent contract killer in the gang. He became a fugitive in 1979 in order to evade charges in a federal horse race-fixing investigation, and was captured in Boca Raton, Florida in 1995. In 1999, Martorano pleaded guilty to involvement in 20 mob-related killings, became a government witness and was sentenced to 14 years in prison. He was released in 2007 after serving 12 years.
- Patrick Joseph "Pat" Nee – An associate of Bulger and Weeks. The Irish-born Nee emerged as the leader of the South Boston Mullen Gang after service in the Marine Corps in Vietnam. After the Mullens merged with the Killens under the supervision of the Howie Winter, Nee became a key member of the Winter Hill Gang in South Boston. He later took part in armored car robberies with Charlestown gangsters, and served as the IRA's chief gunrunner in Boston. He was released from prison in 2000 and wrote the book A Criminal and an Irishman in 2006.
- Kevin P. O'Neil – O'Neil was a Winter Hill Gang member who acted as a money launderer for the gang and served as a "front man" in real estate deals for corrupt FBI agent John Connolly. He also owned Triple-O's Lounge, a South Boston tavern that was used as a headquarters by Winter Hill Gang members. O'Neil was arrested on federal racketeering charges on November 17, 1999. He cooperated with the government, pleaded guilty to racketeering in October 2000, and was sentenced to a year in prison in September 2004.
- Elliot Paul Price – Price was a Las Vegas casino executive indicted along with the hierarchy of the Winter Hill Gang on horse race-fixing charges in 1979. He was convicted and sentenced to two months in prison.
- Charles G. "Charlie" Raso – Raso was a bookmaker originally partnered with Joe Notorangeli, who was killed by the Winter Hill Gang in 1973. He then began working with James Bulger, Steve Flemmi and John Martorano. He also laundered money for Martorano.
- James L. "Jimmy" Sims – Sims was a founding member of the Winter Hill Gang. He was involved in the gang's horse race-fixing scheme and went on the run in 1977 to avoid state charges before being captured in Key West, Florida in 1982. Sims was convicted in the race fixing scheme in 1983, and disappeared following his release from Walpole State Prison in 1987.
- Salvatore "Sal" Sperlinga – Sperlinga was a Somerville bookmaker. He was among the original members of the Winter Hill Gang. On October 20, 1977, Sperlinga was arrested along with Howard Winter and charged with extortion and conspiracy in relation to a pinball machine racket. Sperlinga was convicted in January 1978 and sentenced to nine-to-ten years in state prison. While on work release from prison on January 4, 1980, Sperlinga was shot and killed by drug dealer Daniel Moran as he played cards in a social club in Magoun Square. Sperlinga had reportedly tried to keep Moran out of the neighborhood. Moran was convicted of first-degree murder and sentenced to life in prison.
- Howard Thomas "Howie" Winter – Winter was a founding member of the Winter Hill Gang, and became boss after James McLean was killed in 1965. He ran the gang until he was imprisoned on state and federal charges in 1979. Winter later retired to Worcester County. He died, aged 91, on November 12, 2020.
- Joseph "Joey Y" Yerardi – Yerardi was a Newton bookmaker and loanshark.

== List of murders committed by the Winter Hill Gang ==
Name	Date	Reason
Bernard "Bernie" McLaughlin	October 31, 1961	40-year-old Charlestown Gang member McLaughlin was shot by James McLean in Charlestown during the Winter Hill–Charlestown gang war.
Ronald P. Dermody	September 4, 1964	Dermody, a 32-year-old Charlestown gangster, was shot by McLean in Watertown after McLean was tipped off to Dermody's location by FBI agent H. Paul Rico.
Michael Milano	March 8, 1973	30-year-old bartender Milano was shot by John Martorano after he was mistaken for Alfred "Indian Al" Notarangeli, a rival gang leader.
Albert "Bud" Plummer	March 19, 1973	Plummer, a member of Notarangeli's gang, was killed by Martorano using a machine gun while he was driving in the North End during an attempt to kill Notarangeli. Two other rival hoodlums, Frank Capizzi and Hugh "Sonny" Shields, were wounded in the attack.
William O'Brien	March 24, 1973	Notarangeli gang member O'Brien was shot as he drove in South Boston.
James Leary	April 3, 1973	Leary was a member of the Notarangeli gang. He was shot in Miami, Florida.
Joseph "Indian Joe" Notorangeli	April 18, 1973	Notorangeli was the brother of Al Notorangeli. He was shot at a payphone in Boston.
James "Spike" O'Toole	December 1, 1973	Former Charlestown Gang associate O'Toole was shot in the head by Joe McDonald at a bar in Boston after he had wounded Vincent Flemmi in a shooting.
Alfred "Indian Al" Notarangeli	February 21, 1974	The leader of a rival gang, Notarangeli was shot and killed by Martorano after several failed attempts. Notarangeli's body was left in the trunk of his car.
James Sousa	October 1974	Sousa was killed by Whitey Bulger and Stephen Flemmi after he was arrested and charged in connection with a botched robbery of a dentist in which he participated with Bulger. Bulger was concerned that Sousa may implicate him in the crime. Sousa's body was buried in Boxford by McDonald and Jimmy Sims and has never been recovered.
Paul "Paulie" McGonagle	November 20, 1974	36-year-old McGonagle was a former member of the Mullen Gang and a rival of Bulger in South Boston. He was shot by Bulger after being lured into a car in the Lower End. McGonagle was buried at Tenean Beach in Dorchester, and his body was found in September 2000.
Edward George "Eddie the Bulldog" Connors	June 12, 1975	Connors was shot by Bulger and Flemmi after being lured to a gas station because he had witnessed O'Toole's murder and the gang feared he would inform law enforcement.
Thomas "Tommy" King	November 5, 1975	Mullen Gang member King was lured into a car and shot by Martorano on the orders of Bulger days after he was involved in a bar fight with Bulger. His body was buried near the Neponset River in Quincy. King's remains were unearthed in September 2000.
Francis "Buddy" Leonard	November 6, 1975	Leonard, a friend of King, was killed to divert attention from King's disappearance. He was found shot to death in King's car. Bulger spread the rumor that King had killed Leonard.
Raymond "Ray" Lundgren	January 13, 1976	56-year-old Lundgren, a Los Angeles-based stamp dealer and fence, was shot by McDonald in the parking garage of his apartment complex in Sierra Madre, California after he agreed to testify in a stamp collection robbery.
Richard Castucci	December 29, 1976	Patriarca crime family associate and informant Castucci was killed after FBI agent John Connolly told Bulger that Castucci was an informant. Castucci had told the FBI the whereabouts of two fugitive Winter Hill Gang members. He was shot and left in the trunk of his car.
Roger Wheeler	May 27, 1981	55-year-old Wheeler was the owner of World Jai Alai in Miami. He was shot by Martorano at a country club in Tulsa, Oklahoma after he discovered that the gang were skimming money from his business.
Debra "Debbi" Davis	September 17, 1981	Davis, a 26-year-old girlfriend of Flemmi, was strangled by Flemmi after she tried to end their relationship and was deemed a threat to the gang. She was buried under the Neponset River Bridge in Quincy. Davis' body was recovered in October 2000.
George A. Pappas	October 13, 1981	Drug dealer Pappas defrauded a joint cocaine and marijuana venture operated by the Winter Hill Gang and the Patriarca family. Pappas was shot by Brian "Balloonhead" Halloran during a meeting with Halloran and John "Action Jack" Salemme at the Four Seas restaurant in Boston's Chinatown.
Michael Donahue and Edward Brian "Balloonhead" Halloran	May 11, 1982	Bulger killed Halloran and Donahue in a drive-by shooting using a carbine rifle in South Boston. FBI informant Halloran was targeted after Bulger was alerted by FBI agent Connolly that Halloran had implicated Bulger in two murders, while Donahue, a neighbor of Halloran, was killed because he simply happened to be at the scene.
John Bernard "Jack" Callahan	August 2, 1982	Callahan was a former president of World Jai Alai. He was shot by Martorano on the orders of Bulger after Bulger became concerned that Callahan might implicate him in Wheeler's murder. Callahan's body was found in the trunk of a car at Miami International Airport.
Arthur "Bucky" Barrett	November 30, 1983	46-year-old jewel thief and bank robber Barrett was one of six men who stole $1.5 million from a bank in Medford in 1980. Kevin Weeks lured Barrett to a house in South Boston, where Bulger tortured Barrett until he revealed the location of the cash he had hidden. Bulger then shot him. Barrett was buried in the basement of the house before his remains and those of two others were reburied at a site in Dorchester in October 1985. His remains were retrieved in January 2000.
John McIntyre	November 30, 1984	32-year-old fisherman and FBI informant McIntyre was shot by Bulger six weeks after providing the FBI with information regarding Bulger and Flemmi's gunrunning and drug smuggling operations. He had implicated the pair in a plot to ship guns to the IRA. FBI agent Connolly tipped Bulger off about McIntyre's role as an informant. McIntyre's body was initially buried in the basement of a South Boston home before being exhumed along with two others and reburied in Dorchester in October 1985. His remains were found in January 2000.
Deborah Hussey	January 14, 1985	26-year-old Hussey was the stepdaughter of Flemmi and daughter of Flemmi's girlfriend, Marion Hussey. She was lured to a house in South Boston and strangled by Bulger and Flemmi because she was using drugs and drawing attention to the gang. Hussey was first buried in the basement of the house. In October 1985, her body was reburied in Dorchester with two others. Hussey's remains were found in January 2000.
John R. "Jackie" McDermott	May 10, 1988	58-year-old bookmaker McDermott was shot and killed at his Lowell home by Billy Barnoski after becoming a government witness against the Winter Hill Gang in a gambling-racketeering case. His 27-year-old son, Peter McDermott, was also seriously wounded in the mouth and neck in the shooting.

== See also ==
- Black Mass
- Brotherhood
- The Departed
