= Savin Hill =

- Savin Hill Historic District
- U.S. National Register of Historic Places
- U.S. Historic district
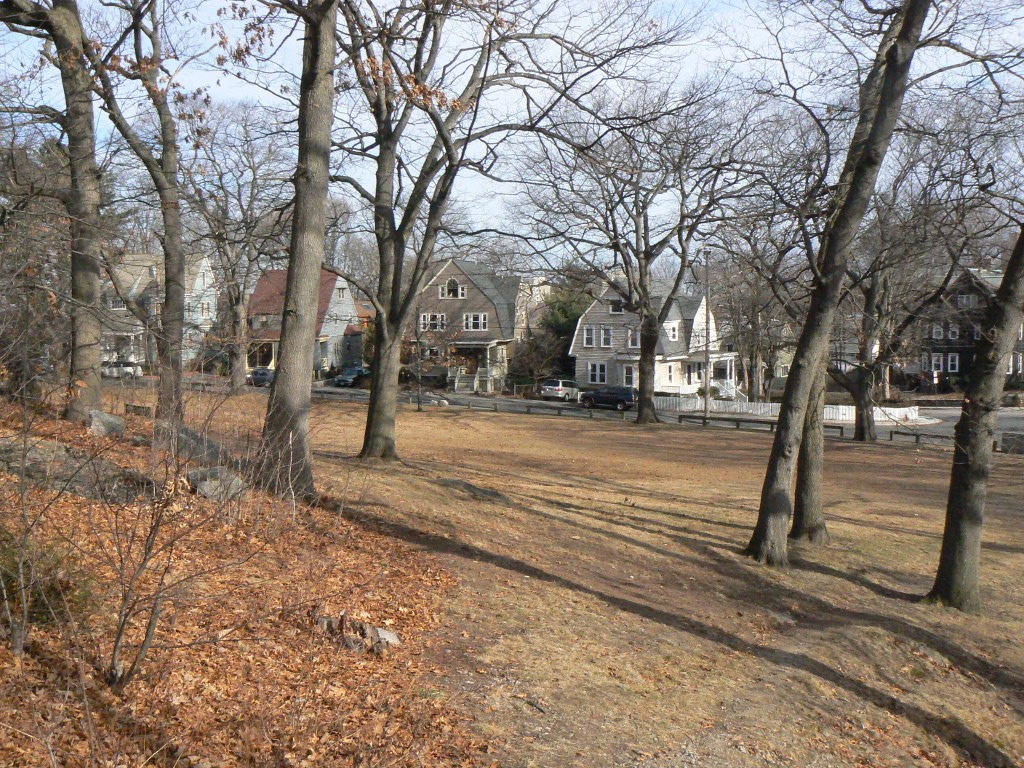
- A view into the neighborhood from the park encompassing the top of Savin Hill

- Location within Massachusetts Location within the United States
- Location: Boston, Massachusetts
- Coordinates: 42°18′33″N 71°3′1″W
- Architect: multiple
- Architectural style: Greek Revival, Gothic Revival
- NRHP reference No.: 03000385
- Added to NRHP: May 9, 2003

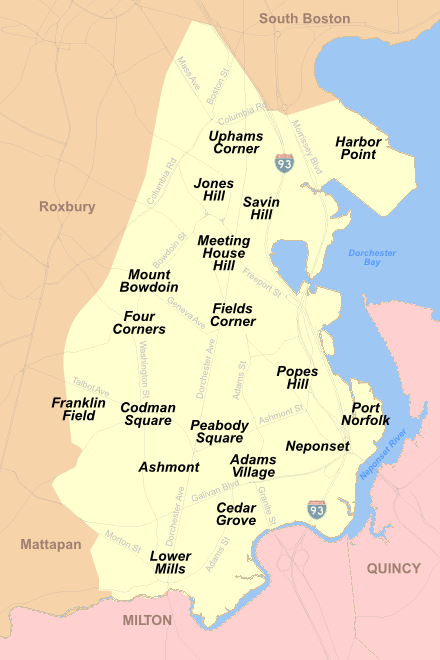
Map showing the locations of Dorchester neighborhoods including Savin Hill

Savin Hill is a section of Dorchester, the largest neighborhood of Boston, Massachusetts, United States.

Named after the geographic feature it covers and surrounds, Savin Hill is about one square mile in area, and has a population of about 15,000 people. Savin Hill Beach and Malibu Beach are nearby and are a resource for surrounding communities. Rail and bus routes give access to and from Savin Hill, especially the Savin Hill station.

It is the home of the Savin Hill Yacht Club which was founded in 1875 as the Savin Hill Beach Association but later changed its name in 1888. The club is located off Morrissey Boulevard, a main artery in the area.

== History ==
=== Origins ===
The Neponset Indians, a part of the larger Massachusett tribe, spent their summers in Savin Hill for centuries before the arrival of Europeans. Captain John Smith of Virginia, the first English settler in America, visited Dorchester in 1614, and had commerce with the Neponset Indians.

Savin Hill was settled and founded in June 1630, just a few months before Boston was settled.

The first non-native people arriving in the area were Puritans who came on the "Mary and John" from England. They had formerly settled further south on the coast, in the Hull area, before moving north to a hill overlooking a protected harbor, now called Dorchester Bay.

They landed in boats and built a settlement for approximately 140 people near what is today the intersection of Grampian Way and Savin Hill Avenue. Originally, the area was named Rock Hill.

By the 1780s, the name changed to Old Hill, a time when the United States was in its infancy.

=== 19th century ===
The original boundary of Dorchester extended almost to the Rhode Island border. As time went on, settlements broke away and the geographical size of the town continued to shrink until 1870, when it disappeared on paper. In that year, the town of Dorchester was incorporated into the city of Boston, and the name became the designation of a neighborhood. By then, the rocky hill where the Puritans first settled had changed its name again, this time to Savin Hill.

Joseph Tuttle, a local innkeeper, who had opened a luxurious hotel at what is today the intersection of Savin Hill Avenue and Tuttle Street, invented the new title "Savin Hill" in 1819, which he named after the red juniper trees (Savin trees) that grew abundantly in the area.

After the American Civil War, the Worthington family, who owned most of the land in present-day Savin Hill, started selling house lots. At that time, most of the Victorian homes that line the slope of the hill were constructed.

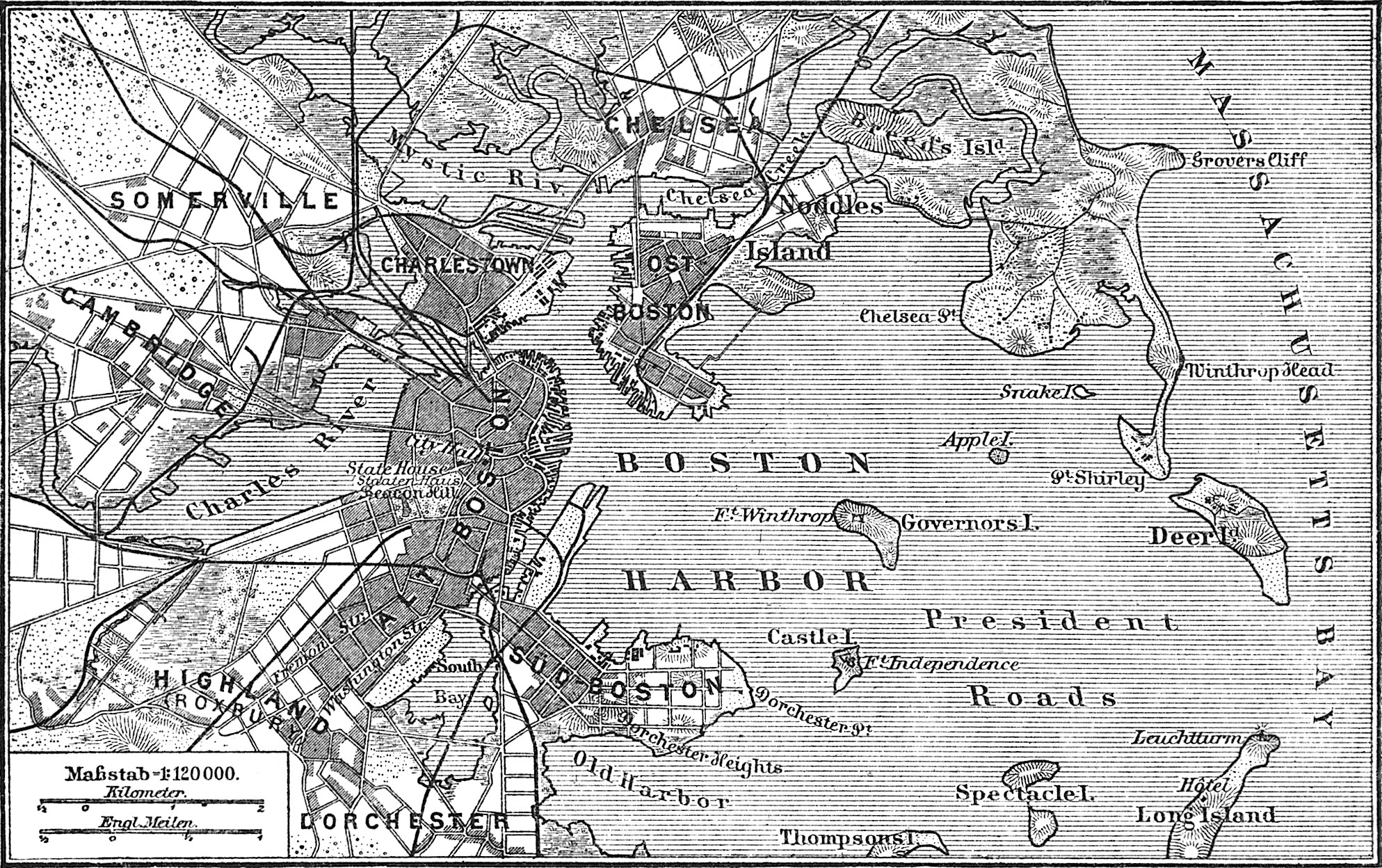
1890 German map of Boston Harbor showing Dorchester in the lower left hand corner.

Transportation influenced the development of the neighborhood. The Shawmut Branch Railroad provided a connection to downtown Boston starting in 1872. It was soon acquired by the Old Colony Railroad.

=== 20th century ===
Savin Hill Station became part of Boston's rapid transit network in 1927, now operated as the MBTA Red Line.

When it was separated from the ocean by Morrissey Boulevard in the early 1930s, Savin Hill became a clearly defined area within Dorchester. The distinct nature of the hill itself was made more evident by the trench of the Southeast Expressway (Interstate 93) in the late 1950s. Today, this original area is often referred to as Savin Hill "over the bridge," meaning on the east side of where Savin Hill Avenue bridges the Expressway. The full section commonly designated Savin Hill now runs as far west as Pleasant Street, and north-south from Columbia Road to Hancock Street.

Its relative isolation, solid and often historically significant housing stock, and proximity to downtown Boston have helped make Savin Hill one of the areas of Dorchester which has undergone the most gentrification in recent years. Many of the neighborhood's traditional two- and three-family houses have been converted to individually owned condominiums since the late 1990s.

=== 21st century ===
Due to its historic character the entire neighborhood was listed on the National Register of Historic Places in 2003.

== See also ==
- National Register of Historic Places listings in southern Boston, Massachusetts

== Bibliography ==
- Giordano, Alice (September 23, 2001). "A Re-awakening of Savin Hill: Dorchester Neighborhood is Undergoing a Rebirth". The Boston Globe. Boston, MA. Archived from the original on October 22, 2012 – via HighBeam Research.
- Sammarco, Anthony Mitchell,
  - "Boston's South End", Images of America series, Arcadia Publishing, 1998.
  - "Dorchester", Images of America series, Arcadia Publishing, 2000.
  - "Dorchester: Then & Now", Arcadia Publishing, 2005.
