= Flemmi =

Flemmi is a surname. Notable people with the surname include:

- Michael Flemmi (born 1937), American police officer
- Stephen Flemmi (born 1934), American gangster
- Vincent Flemmi (1935–1979), Italian-American gangster
