= Vincent Teresa =

American mobster (1928–1990)

- Teresa's July 12, 1967 mugshot
- Born: November 28, 1928; Revere, Massachusetts, U.S.
- Died: February 21, 1990 (aged 61); Des Moines, Washington, U.S.
- Other names: "The Fat Man"; "Fat Vinnie"
- Occupations: Mobster; extortionist; racketeer
- Known for: Turning informant against the Mafia
- Spouse: Blanche Bosselman
- Children: 3
- Allegiance: Patriarca crime family

Vincent Charles Teresa (November 28, 1928 – February 21, 1990) was an American mobster in the Boston branch of the Patriarca crime family who claimed to be a top captain for Raymond Patriarca before becoming a protected government witness in 1971.

== Early life ==
Teresa was born in Revere, Massachusetts in 1928. He was the grandson of Sicilian Mafia member Vincenzo Teresa, who moved to the United States in 1895 and became a bootlegger during Prohibition. The younger Vincent Teresa's uncle, Dominick "Sandy Mac" Teresa, was a driver for Joseph Lombardo, the underboss of Philippo "Don Pipino" Buccola who arrived from Italy to take the reins of the New England Mafia.

While he was still in primary school, Vincent Teresa developed a gambling addiction that led him to plan and execute around one dozen burglaries. He was caught by authorities while robbing a meat market, but did not serve any jail time. Due to several incidents of violence against teachers, Teresa was expelled from school after completing the ninth grade. He subsequently joined the United States Navy, where he worked as a cook. After an altercation with a superior officer, Teresa was court martialed and given a bad conduct discharge in February 1948.

Teresa married his childhood sweetheart Blanche Bosselman in 1949. After his discharge from the Navy, he worked several odd jobs, all which he had to leave after stealing from his employers. During this time, he also partnered with a forger to pass forged checks at different New England banks and embarked on a bank robbery spree.

== Career in the Mafia ==
Using the mob connections of his uncle, Teresa began working for Enrico Tameleo, the underboss of the Patriarca crime family. Teresa earned money by buying up businesses and burning them down for insurance money. He also opened a nightclub on Cape Cod to use as a front for his loan sharking and racketeering operations. In 1963, Teresa was detained by police in connection with a one-million-dollar heist of Ming dynasty jade. He was released due to lack of evidence. During the Irish Mob War, Teresa was once again detained by police, this time on suspicion of murdering Joseph Francione. He later stated that Joseph Barboza committed the murder.

In the mid-1960s, Teresa moved on to two new criminal enterprises. The first was the outwardly legitimate business of gambling junkets. Teresa arranged for large groups of wealthy gamblers to be flown to Las Vegas, London and the Caribbean, where they gambled at casinos. He used the junkets to convince patrons to subsidize his illegal money lending, promising them high interest rates. He would take their money and not pay the interest, threatening them if they protested. His second venture involved a foray into selling stolen and forged bonds. Teresa, an obese man who weighed up to 325 pounds, was known as "the Fat Man". He rose to become the third-most powerful member of the Patriarca family and earned over $150 million for his Mafia bosses during his criminal career.

In 1969, one of his associates was caught selling stolen securities and revealed Teresa's role to the FBI. Teresa was indicted and sentenced to twenty years for conspiracy and transporting stolen securities. He served several months at the Lewisburg penitentiary, where he was housed on a block known as "Mafia Row", along with John Gotti, Jimmy Hoffa and Carmine Galante.

After Teresa discovered that other members of the Patriarca crime family had taken a $4 million stash meant for his family, he agreed to become an informant for the FBI. He entered the United States Federal Witness Protection Program and received a new identity as "Charles Cantino". Teresa ultimately testified before at least 22 grand juries on organized crime activities, resulting in the indictments or convictions of over 50 mobsters, including Meyer Lansky. He testified in front of the US Senate in 1971. In January 1978, Teresa filed a 300-page sworn deposition in Miami claiming to have heard Mafia bosses planning to assassinate Fidel Castro for $4 million on orders from the Central Intelligence Agency (CIA) in the early 1960s.

== Later life ==
After he entered witness protection, Teresa wrote three books: the 1973 My Life In The Mafia, co-written with Newsday writer Thomas C. Renner, which documented his Cosa Nostra career and the 1960s Boston Irish Mob Wars; the 1975 Vinnie Teresa's Mafia, also co-written with Renner, which documented his life during his time in the Federal Witness Protection Program and beyond; and the 1978 fictional novel Wiseguys, solely written by Teresa.

My Life In The Mafia chronicles Teresa's path to a life in organized crime, his time as a lieutenant for Raymond Patriarca, his fall in the Patriarca crime family, and the circumstances that led to him to seek the protection of the Federal government and the Federal Witness Protection Program. Teresa's testimony put a large number of the Patriarca crime family in jail.

Vinnie Teresa's Mafia chronicles Teresa's time as a government witness and subsequent life, with a number of anecdotes on his former life in the mob. Due to claimed government indifference, he does not succeed in making a life for himself and his family once out of witness protection. He was very bitter against the Federal government for his treatment in the Federal Witness Protection Program, feeling they used him with no regard to his safety, or an appreciation of his value. Thomas C. Renner implies this may have been more melodramatics than reality.

Teresa's final book and fictional novel, Wiseguys, was written solely by Teresa. The story is of Johnny Forza, a thinly disguised doppelganger of Teresa. It chronicles Forza's life as a betrayed government witness, his battles with a former friend mob member "Butch" (again, a thinly disguised doppelganger for New Jersey mob member Frank "Butch" Miceli), his life on the lam with his girlfriend and his final confrontations with everyone who has done him wrong.

Normally, to become a made member in an Italian mob, potential candidates have to first commit a murder at the direction of the mob. Teresa claimed that while he reached the position of lieutenant in the Patriarca crime family, this was mainly due to his prowess as a money maker for Raymond Patriarca, and that he never murdered anyone. The US government had no evidence to the contrary and as he was a very valuable witness, he was taken at his word.

In the Witness Protection Program, Teresa and his family were briefly located in El Paso, Texas and San Diego, California before they settled in the Seattle area, where he lived under his new identity. His son Wayne was convicted of first-degree murder in the drug-related, execution-style shooting of William Walkins III, whose body was found dumped on a bank of the Green River in Kent, Washington. Wayne was sentenced to life imprisonment at the Washington State Penitentiary. In 1981, Teresa was investigated in an alleged plot to kill the prosecutors who had convicted his son. In 1982, he was charged with conspiracy to import cocaine from Bolivia. Teresa was convicted of drug trafficking in Tacoma, Washington and sentenced to ten years in prison.

On November 27, 1984, Teresa, along with his daughter Cindy, sons Wayne and David, daughter-in-law Lynne, and an Indonesian man, Bobby Lhaksana, were indicted by a federal grand jury on charges of conspiring to smuggle $1 million worth of rare birds and animals into the United States from Australia, New Guinea and Indonesia between 1982 and 1984.

== Death ==
Although Teresa always lived in fear of being murdered by the Patriarca crime family, he died of natural causes. By 1988, Teresa and his wife Blanche were living in poverty at the apartment of his son David in Des Moines, Washington, near Seattle, where he died of kidney failure at the age of 61 on February 21, 1990. He was buried at Washington Memorial Cemetery. His biographer Thomas C. Renner died a month earlier in January 1990.
