= Richard Castucci =

Member of crime family in the US

- Born: December 1, 1928; Somerville, Massachusetts, U.S.
- Died: December 29, 1976 (aged 48); Revere, Massachusetts, U.S.
- Cause of death: Gunshot wound
- Occupation: Mobster
- Spouse: Sandra Castucci
- Children: 4
- Allegiance: Patriarca crime family

Richard J. Castucci Sr. (December 1, 1928 – December 29, 1976) was an American member of the Patriarca crime family who owned several strip clubs and was involved in illegal gambling. Castucci eventually became a government informant.

== Early life ==
Castucci was a nephew of Boston bookmaker Arthur Ventola, who was close to the Patriarca crime family. He had one brother who was involved with one of Castucci's restaurants. His second wife was Sandra Castucci. His children included a daughter Denise, a son Richard Castucci Jr. and two other children. Castucci and his family lived in Revere, Massachusetts.

At age 21, Castucci was featured in the Boston Herald after stopping an armed robbery with his father.

== Mob career ==
Castucci was a close associate of mobster Stephen Flemmi, a leader of the Winter Hill Gang and a secret FBI informant. Castucci introduced Flemmi and mobster John Martorano to a major New York bookmaker when they were organizing Anthony Ciulla's race fixing scheme.

Castucci owned several clubs and strip bars in the Boston area, including the Ebb Tide Lounge, the Libra Lounge, the 571 Club, Jaws, and the Squire. Overlooking Revere Beach, the Ebb Tide soon became a "clubhouse" for members of the Patriarca family to socialize and plan crimes. In 1965, the Edward Deegan mob hit was organized there. By the late 1960s, the Ebb Tide had earned such a bad reputation that Castucci changed its name to The Beach Ball. By 1969, Castucci was hosting high-stakes poker games at the Beach Ball.

By 1970, Castucci was reportedly in deep financial trouble. He had two families, a $16,000 second house mortgage, bills from his clubs, and expensive loan shark loans. He was being hounded by loan shark collectors and was in debt to John Harrison, also known as "Hard Boiled John", paying $300 to $400 installments.

== Becoming an informant ==
On January 30, 1970, needing money and protection from law enforcement, Castucci become an FBI informant. He was enrolled in the FBI's highly secretive Top Echelon Informant Program. When Castucci found out that Winter Hill members Joseph "Joe Mac" McDonald and James Sims were hiding from the authorities in the Greenwich Village section of New York City, he passed that information to his FBI handlers.

== Murder ==
In 1976, the Winter Hill gang discovered Castucci's deception and planned his murder. Gang boss Whitey Bulger, also an FBI informant, ordered Castucci's killing. However, Bulger decided to wait until the end of the National Football League season so that he could also steal Castucci's sports betting earnings.

At the end of the football season, Castucci went to a garage in Somerville, Massachusetts to pick up his winnings. At the garage, Martorano handed Castucci a bag of cash and told him to go to an apartment with Flemmi and Bulger. At the apartment, Castucci was sitting in the kitchen sorting his cash when Martorano walked behind Castucci and shot him in the head. Bulger and Flemmi cleaned up the blood, wrapped the body in a child's blanket, and stuffed it into the trunk of Castucci's new Cadillac Sedan de Ville. They drove the Cadillac to Revere, where they abandoned it behind an apartment complex. The car and Castucci's body were discovered in the aftermath of a snowstorm.

== Coverup ==
On discovering Castucci's body, the FBI immediately suspected Bulger and Flemmi. However, John J. Connolly was handling both men as FBI informants and they had provided him with valuable information on the Patriarca Family. Connolly wanted to protect Bulger and Flemmi from prosecution. Connolly told the agency that the murder was not typical of Winter Hill killings and that he did not think Bulger and Flemmi did it. Connolly also reported to the FBI that Castucci owed money to both Winter Hill Gang and the Patriarcas, but had only paid Winter Hill. Connolly's implication was that Patriarcas were not paid and therefore murdered Castucci. Given this misdirection, the FBI did not pursue Bulger and Flemmi as suspects.

Following the Castucci murder, Connolly befriended Castucci's widow. He was also a regular diner at a restaurant owned by Castucci's brother-in-law from his first marriage.

On June 12, 2009, a federal judge ordered the Federal Government to pay $6.25 million to the Castucci family for the wrongful death of Richard Castucci.
