= Richard J. Schneiderhan =

American former police officer and criminal

Richard Joseph Schneiderhan (June 13, 1934 – September 16, 2015) was a former Massachusetts State Police Lieutenant in the Attorney General's Organized Crime Unit. He was convicted of conspiracy and obstruction of justice stemming from his relationship with gangster Stephen Flemmi and the Winter Hill Gang. Schneiderhan had warned an associate of fugitive mob boss James "Whitey" Bulger that Bulger's brothers' phones were being monitored by the FBI.

== Biography ==
Schneiderhan was born in Roxbury, Massachusetts to working-class immigrants from Riedlingen, Donau, Germany. He grew up in a tenement at 25 Ambrose Street in Roxbury, in the predominantly Italian Orchard Park neighborhood where the Patriarca crime family capo Ilario Zannino, Ilario's first cousin Phillip Zannino, and the Flemmi brothers, were born and raised. As a childhood friend of the brothers Vincent Flemmi, Michael Flemmi and Stephen Flemmi, he idolized Stephen and maintained a friendship with him into adulthood.

He graduated from high school in 1952. He served in the Marine Corps and was a veteran of the Korean War. After his honorable discharge in 1955, he joined the Boston Police Department, where he worked with (now Detective) Michael Flemmi and Detective Joseph Lundbaum. In 1959, he joined the Massachusetts State Police and worked until 1981. After his retirement, he worked for the New England State Police Intelligence Network.

From 1968 to 1978, he worked in the Attorney General's Organized Crime Unit, where he rose to chief intelligence officer and was regarded as an expert on organized crime. Working in the unit gave him access to information that could help his friend Stephen Flemmi, now a powerful figure in the Winter Hill Gang. It has been suggested, but never proven, that he accepted bribes for this information.

When Flemmi went to jail in 1999, Schneiderhan kept in touch with him and with Kevin Weeks, Bulger's deputy, who knew that Schneiderhan had done many favors for the gang. In September 1999, Schneiderhan learned from his brother-in-law about the FBI telephone surveillance of Bulger's brothers. He informed Weeks, who in turn informed Bulger. Two months later, Weeks was arrested on racketeering charges, and he began cooperating with the authorities, which included helping to find the bodies of six gang victims and giving up Schneiderhan.

Schneiderhan was called to testify before grand jury corruption hearings because of his relationship with Flemmi and the Winter Hill Gang. In letters to his son Eric, he had written that if he ever got into a jam with the law he should contact "Paul". When Eric told the grand jury he wasn't sure if "Paul" was his father's code name for Flemmi, he was indicted for perjury, but found not guilty at trial.

On March 19, 2003, Schneiderhan was convicted of conspiracy and obstruction of justice. His two co-defendants, his brother-in-law and niece, pleaded guilty for their roles in warning of the FBI telephone surveillance and were sentenced to one year of custody. Schneiderhan was remanded to the Federal Correctional Complex in Butner, North Carolina. He was released on October 4, 2006, and lived in Holbrook, Massachusetts.

In August 2003, the Massachusetts State Board of Retirement ruled that the disability pension Schneiderhan began receiving when he retired in 1984 should continue because he was no longer a member of the state police when he committed his crimes.

On September 16, 2015, Schneiderhan died at his home in Holbrook, Massachusetts.
