= Paul Rico =

FBI agent (1925–2004)

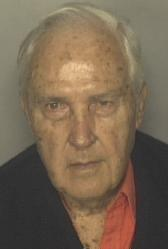
- Photo taken after 2003 arrest
- Born: Harold Paul Rico; April 29, 1925; Boston, Massachusetts, U.S.
- Died: January 16, 2004 (aged 78); Tulsa, Oklahoma, U.S.
- Occupation: FBI agent (1951–1975)
- Years active: 1951–2003

Harold Paul Rico (April 29, 1925 – January 16, 2004) was an American Federal Bureau of Investigation (FBI) Special Agent, indicted for murder in 2003. He was accused of the 1968 framing of four men for murder, but died before his trial would have taken place. The writer Howie Carr called Rico "perhaps the most corrupt FBI agent in history".

== Early life ==
Rico was born in the Boston suburb of Belmont, Massachusetts in 1925, the son of an Irish mother and Spanish father who was an employee of New England Telephone. He graduated from Boston College in 1950 with a bachelor's degree in history.

== FBI career ==
Rico joined the FBI in 1951 at the age of 26 and was initially posted in Chicago before being transferred to the Boston office after his father became terminally ill. While investigating his first major case, the Great Brink's Robbery, Rico learned the value of recruiting informants. In 1956, he recognized fugitive bank robber James "Whitey" Bulger in a Revere bar and arrested him.

At the urging of U.S. Attorney General Robert F. Kennedy, the previously reluctant FBI became committed to combatting the Mafia starting in the mid-1960s. Considering the Mafia a greater threat than all other organized crime groups in the United States combined, the Organized Crime Program of the FBI targeted La Cosa Nostra as its highest national priority. Rico and his partner, Dennis Condon, became the most senior FBI agents investigating organized crime in Boston. Rico's Spanish origins allowed him to pass for an Italian, which benefited him when working undercover to insulate himself with the Mafia.

Rico recruited members of Somerville's Winter Hill Gang as informants. Although he was aware that the gangster Stephen "the Rifleman" Flemmi had committed several murders, Rico had Flemmi designated a Top Echelon informant, the highest status an FBI source can achieve, due to his ability to provide information on the leaders of the Patriarca crime family of New England.

=== Deegan murder ===
In 1965, Rico received information that gangster Edward "Teddy" Deegan had been murdered by Italian-American hitman Vincent Flemmi under orders from Winter Hill Gang boss Howie Winter. Rico then watched as Portuguese-American hitman Joe Barboza committed perjury and claimed that he had committed Deegan's murder under orders from four made men in the Patriarca crime family: Peter Limone, underboss Henry Tameleo, Joe Salvati and Louis Greco. Tameleo died in 1985 in prison and Greco died in 1995 in prison, too; Salvati was released in 1997, and Limone in 2001. When interrogated during U.S. House Judiciary Committee hearings in October 2003 about the four wrongful convictions, an enraged Rico responded, "What do you want, tears?"

The two survivors and the estates of the deceased were awarded $101.7 million in damages by U.S. District Judge Nancy Gertner in Boston on July 26, 2007.

=== Patriarca family murder trial ===
Rico was in charge of cooperative witness John "Red" Kelley, an Irish American mobster and sometime associate of the Patriarca crime family, during a murder trial of family boss Raymond Patriarca and four members of the family, Maurice Lerner, Robert Fairbrothers, John Rossi, and Rudolph Sciarra. The five were tried in 1970 for murder and conspiracy to commit murder in the 1968 shotgun murders of Rudolph "Rudy" Marfeo and Anthony Melei. Kelley testified he had been contracted by Lerner to kill Marfeo and Melei, whom Kelley and Lerner allegedly murdered. After the trial, Kelley went into the federal witness protection program.

Patriarca and his associates were convicted of conspiracy to commit murder and were sentenced to 10 years in prison. Lerner also was convicted of two counts of murder for which he was sentenced to two life terms in addition to the ten years for conspiracy, all of the sentences to be served consecutively. The jury was unable to reach a verdict for the other four defendants. Lerner's conviction subsequently was quashed by the Rhode Island Supreme Court in 1988. It had been established that Kelley had perjured himself at the trial, as had Rico, who had corroborated Kelley's testimony. The Court vacated his conviction and ordered a new trial.

== Murder indictment and death ==
On October 9, 2003, Rico was indicted for murder in Oklahoma and Florida for persuading Bulger and Stephen Flemmi to sanction the murder of Oklahoma City millionaire Roger Wheeler on May 27, 1981. Rico died on January 16, 2004, in a Tulsa hospital (to which he was moved from prison) still under indictment for the 1981 murder. He was 78.

The Oklahoma state medical examiner said internal bleeding led to Rico's death. He also had hardening of the kidneys and disease of the heart and blood vessels.

== See also ==
- Murder of Edward Deegan
