= Joseph Barboza =

American hitman and boxer (1932–1976)

Joseph Barboza Jr.
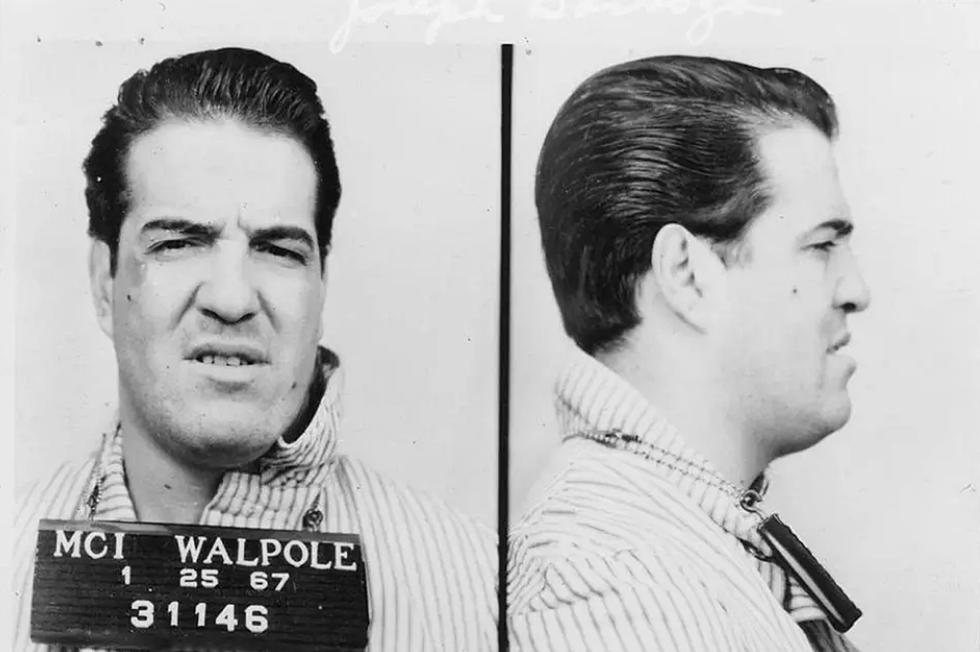
- Barboza's 1967 mugshot
- Born: Joseph Barboza Jr. September 20, 1932; New Bedford, Massachusetts, U.S.
- Died: February 11, 1976 (aged 43); San Francisco, California, U.S.
- Cause of death: Murder by gunshot wounds
- Resting place: South Dartmouth Cemetery, Dartmouth, Massachusetts, U.S.
- Other names: "The Animal"; "The Baron"; "The Wild Thing"; "The Joe Valachi of New England"; "Joseph Donati"; "Joseph Barboza Baron"; "Joseph Bentley"
- Occupation: Mobster
- Children: 2
- Allegiance: Patriarca crime family The Dark Brotherhood
- Conviction: Murder (1971)
- Penalty: 5 years' imprisonment
- Boxing career
- Nickname: The Baron
- Weight: Light heavyweight

Boxing record
- Total fights: 11
- Wins: 8
- Losses: 3

Joseph Barboza Jr. (/bɑːrˈboʊzə/; September 20, 1932 – February 11, 1976), nicknamed "the Animal", was an American mobster and notorious mob hitman for the Patriarca crime family of New England during the 1960s. A prominent enforcer and contract killer in Boston's underworld, Barboza became a Federal Bureau of Investigation (FBI) informant in 1967 and later entered the Witness Protection Program. He was a star witness in the trial of six men convicted in the 1965 murder of Edward Deegan; four of the accused were sentenced to death and another two were sentenced to life imprisonment. It later emerged that Barboza had helped frame the six defendants in a case of wrongful conviction for the Deegan killing, which was allegedly actually committed by Barboza and Vincent Flemmi. He was shot dead in San Francisco in 1976 after his whereabouts became known to Patriarca underboss Gennaro Angiulo.

== Early life ==
Barboza was born on September 20, 1932, in New Bedford, Massachusetts, to Portuguese emigrants from Valpaços in the Alto Trás-os-Montes, Joseph Barboza Sr. (born José Barbosa), a middle-weight boxer, and Palmeda Camille, who was a seamstress. His father was a Los Angeles-based prizefighter who competed in only two professional boxing matches; his debut bout was against Pete Frisco on January 27, 1933, and his second match was against Carlos Chipres on April 27, 1933. Barboza had two brothers; Donald and Anthony Barboza and a sister, Anne Houghton.

Although Barboza had less than an eighth-grade education and was barely literate, he was fluent in Portuguese, Italian and Spanish. He was married to a Jewish woman and fathered a daughter in 1965 and also a son and lived in Chelsea, Massachusetts, while employed by the Patriarca crime family.

== Professional boxing career ==
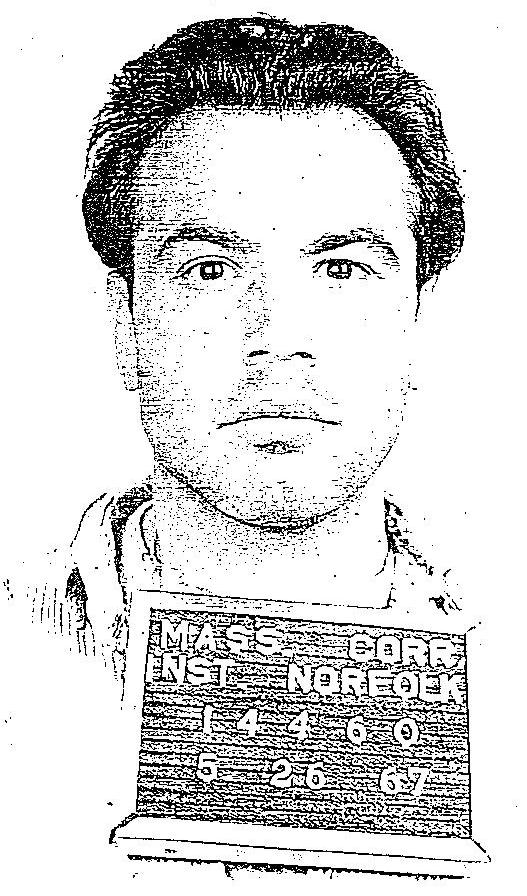
Sacramone, sparring partner, in 1967

Barboza was a stocky, muscular man with a thick neck and an angular, watermelon-shaped skull. He would pursue a career as a professional light heavyweight boxer and member of the United States Boxing Association, using the name of "the Baron". His first boxing match on April 18, 1949, against Rocky Lucero in El Paso, Texas, and his last fight on September 23, 1961, against Don Bale in Boston. He fought with an orthodox stance. His boxing record shows Joseph as winning eight out of the eleven matches, with five of them ending in knock outs. He was classified as an out-fighter who was known for having very powerful punches. He was a sparring partner of Patriarca crime family associate, Americo Sacramone, future Massachusetts Auditor Joe DeNucci, Edward G. Connors and Anthony Veranis. He later worked as a longshoreman and as a clerk in a fruit store but always returned to crime.

== Criminal career ==
=== Escape from prison ===
Barboza became involved in criminal activity, including robberies and assaults, as a teenager. He was first sent to prison at the age of 18 in 1950 to the Massachusetts Correctional Institution - Concord for five years. Barboza would later lead a wild prison break in the summer of 1953, which would become the largest in the prison's seventy-five-year history. Joe and six other fellow inmates had guzzled contraband whiskey and pilfered amphetamine tablets, overpowered four prison guards and raced away in two separate cars. During their furlough of freedom they beat random people in the street, cruised the bars in Boston's Scollay Square, wandered to the neighborhoods of Lynn and Revere, and were finally apprehended at a subway station in East Boston. The escape party had barely lasted twenty-four hours. That November, while awaiting trial for his prison break, Barboza slugged a prison guard in the cafeteria for no reason. Three months later, he tossed a table at a guard's chest when he entered his cell.

=== Entry into organized crime ===
Barboza may have first been exposed to figures of Boston organized crime while incarcerated at Walpole. Paroled in 1958, he became a recognized figure in East Boston's organized crime circles and was a regular at a bar on the corner of Bennington Street and Brook Street, which became known among local criminals as "Barboza's Corner". His crew of small-time burglars and thieves consisted of Joseph W. Amico, Patrick Fabiano, James Kearns, Arthur Bratsos, Thomas DePrisco, father and son team Joseph and Ronald Dermody, Carlton Eaton, Edward Goss and Nicholas Femia. The crew was officially supervised for the Patriarca crime family by Stephen "The Rifleman" Flemmi. He was never officially inducted into the Patriarca crime family because of his non-Italian ancestry, but within eight years during the escalation of gangland warfare, he earned a reputation as one of Boston's most prolific contract killers and sidewalk soldiers. Due to his dark complexion and Portuguese heritage, Barboza was referred to as "the nigger" by his Italian associates. According to Patriarca associate-turned-government witness Vincent Teresa, Barboza "hated Negroes" and killed at least two victims solely due to their race. In 1964, Barboza legally changed his surname to "Baron".

It was widely believed in law official circles that Barboza had performed contract killings for Raymond L. S. Patriarca. By January 1966, Barboza was considered a powerful crime figure in the Boston underworld. For disturbing the peace one night, he slugged a Metropolitan District Commission Police Officer, Joe MacLean, and received a six-month sentence.

A few notorious victims on his murder roster included Edward McLaughlin and both Cornelius Hughes and Stevie Hughes, killed between 1965 and 1966. Barboza aligned himself with the Winter Hill Gang in part because James "Buddy" McLean was an ally of Vincent Flemmi, who Barboza trusted along with his brother Stephen Flemmi. As early as 1965, Federal Bureau of Investigation (FBI) agent H. Paul Rico, was using that trust to drive Barboza into becoming an informant. Barboza drove a 1965 Oldsmobile Cutlass which was referred to by law enforcement as "the James Bond car" because it had a sophisticated alarm system and a device for making thick black smoke come out of the tailpipe.

=== Turning government witness ===
By 1966, he had a very turbulent position in the Boston underworld. He had been shot at while standing outside his home in Chelsea. The local authorities believed there had been other unreported attempts. Brimming with reckless power, he was not abiding to the traditional rules of La Cosa Nostra. One night he went into a nightclub that was paying Gennaro Angiulo for protection and demanded that the owner make payments to him as well. By mid-1966, the unrelenting attention from the law Barboza received from the authorities only made his standing in organized crime more tenuous.

In October 1966, he came to terms with his falling-out with the organized crime element after he and three local hoodlums were arrested on weapons charges while cruising the Combat Zone in Boston. His accomplices were released on bail, but Barboza had his bail set at $100,000 (nearly one million dollars in 2025 money), which he could not afford. Nobody from the Patriarca crime family came down to post his bail, and he heard that it was the Mafia family who tipped off the police.

Two of his associates, Bratsos and DePrisco, went to raise Barboza's bail. Five weeks later, after raising $59,000, the pair were murdered in the Nite Lite Cafe by soldiers serving under Ralph "Ralphie Chong" Lamattina, who served in the crew of Ilario Zannino. After relieving them of their bail money, they stuffed their bodies in the back seat of Bratsos' car and dumped it in South Boston, hoping to throw blame onto the Irish gangs. However, a mob associate named Joseph Lanzi tipped the police about the murder. On April 18, 1967, he was murdered by Jerry Angiulo's enforcers Carmen Gagliardi, Frank Otero and Ben DeChristoforo.

The FBI began diligent efforts to turn Barboza into an informant. In December, Joe Amico was murdered. The following month, after a ten-day trial, Barboza was sentenced to a five-year term at Walpole on the weapons charges. In the summer of 1967, Steve Flemmi met with Joseph and informed him that Gennaro Angiulo and his brothers had plans to murder him. In June 1967, Barboza turned FBI informant while imprisoned for murder, and eventually testified against Raymond Patriarca before becoming one of the first informants to enter the Witness Protection Program. The government told Barboza his wife and children would not be protected unless he agreed to testify. The government also promised to set him up in his own restaurant — and plastic surgery to change his appearance and further protect Barboza and his family — but it did not fulfill either of these promises.

Barboza went on to testify against Raymond Patriarca and many high-ranking members and associates of the New England family. On June 20, Patriarca and Henry Tameleo were indicted for conspiracy to murder in the 1966 killing of Providence bookmaker Willie Marfeo. On August 9, Gennaro Angiulo was accused of participating in the murder of Rocco DiSeglio. Finally in October, six men were charged with the March 1965 murder of Edward "Teddy" Deegan, who had been marked for death for several burglaries which he had committed with Stephen Flemmi, in Chelsea. Shortly after the indictment of Raymond Patriarca, which drew front-page stories about Barboza as a turncoat, Barboza wrote to the Boston Herald: "All I want to be is left alone." The La Cosa Nostra was willing to pay Barboza $25,000 to quit talking. He showed some interest in the deal raising the price to $50,000 which was agreed upon but later turned down after consulting his lawyer.

Angiulo was later found not guilty. Despite efforts by reporters to coax jurors to explain their deliberations, none did. Twenty years later, however, jury foreman Kenneth Matthews said none of the sixteen jurors had found Barboza believable, stating "He didn't help the state at all. He wasn't reliable. He was nothing as a witness".

On January 30, 1968, a bomb was planted in the car of Barboza's attorney, John E. Fitzgerald, future Rapid City, South Dakota Judge for the 7th Circuit, resulting in Fitzgerald losing his right leg below the knee. After that Barboza was moved around frequently from Thacher Island to Fort Devens and even to the Junior Officers' quarters located in Fort Knox, Kentucky. Barboza owned a German Shepherd and while at Fort Knox he would walk his dog with future corrupt FBI agent John Morris who was a member of the military police at the time. In May 1968, the Deegan trial began. After 50 days of testimony and deliberations, the jury returned a guilty verdict. Found guilty and sentenced to death were Peter Limone, Louis Greco, Henry Tameleo and Ronald Cassesso. Sentenced to life in prison were Joseph Salvati and Wilfred Roy French.

Barboza was given a one-year prison term, including time served. He was paroled in March 1969, under the name of "Joseph Bentley", and relocated to Santa Rosa, California where he enrolled in a culinary arts school. In summer 1970, Barboza murdered Clay Wilson. According to the FBI, this was the 26th murder by Barboza. In 1971, he pleaded guilty to a second-degree murder charge and was sentenced to five years at Folsom Prison. In prison Barboza wrote poems about the American Mafia, "Boston Gang War", "The Mafia Double Crosses", "A Cat's Lives" and "The Gang War".

==== False testimony against rivals ====
While working for the FBI, Agent H. Paul Rico helped to frame Joseph Salvati, Peter Limone, Louis Greco as well as his former mob superior, Henry Tameleo for the murder of Edward Deegan.

Out of the six people convicted for the murder, only Ronald "Ronnie the Pig" Cassesso and Wilfred Roy French were actually involved and present in the alley where the murder took place. FBI agent Paul Rico had offered French and Cassesso leniency if they would corroborate Barboza's false testimony. Both French and Cassesso refused the offer and when French was threatened with the death penalty he responded by telling Rico to "warm up the electric chair". Cassesso died in prison 30 years later. French was finally freed 34 years later.

Winter Hill enforcer John Martorano became a government witness in 1999 after learning that both Stephen Flemmi and James "Whitey" Bulger were FBI informants and had been delivering information about the Mafia and the Winter Hill Gang to them. In his plea agreement, he told the Drug Enforcement Administration (DEA) agent that Barboza had admitted to lying about the men convicted of killing Teddy Deegan.

Martorano also revealed that Vincent Flemmi had admitted to murdering Deegan.

Tameleo and Greco died in prison after serving almost 30 years, and Salvati and Limone were finally released in 1997 and 2001, respectively. The families of Greco, Tameleo, Salvati and Limone filed lawsuits totaling in excess of one billion dollars filed against the Federal government. In July 2007, U.S. District Judge Nancy Gertner in Boston found the bureau helped convict the four men and the U.S. Government was ordered to pay $100 million in damages to the four defendants.

== Death ==
Barboza was released on October 30, 1975 and moved into a $250-a-month apartment as "Joseph Donati". He took the last name from twin brothers Richard and Robert Donati. After he was befriended by small-time South Boston hoodlum James Chalmas, Gennaro Angiulo found out where Barboza was. On February 11, 1976, Barboza left Chalmas' San Francisco apartment; as he was walking to his car, he was hit by four shotgun blasts at close range. Although he was armed with a Colt .38, Barboza never had a chance to draw it.

Barboza's attorney F. Lee Bailey said about his death "With all due respect to my former client, I don't think society has suffered a great loss".

Ilario Zannino, chief enforcer of Gennaro Angiulo, was later overheard on a hidden bug saying that it was J. R. Russo who had assassinated Barboza. In the conversation, Zannino described Russo as "a genius with a carbine".

Barboza is buried in South Dartmouth Cemetery in Dartmouth, Massachusetts.

== Victims ==
Num	Victim	Date of death	Reason
1	Harold Hannon	August 4, 1964	Revenge for the murder of Tommy Sullivan.
2	Wilfred J. Delaney	August 4, 1964	Ally of Harold Hannon.
3	Theodore Deegan	March 12, 1965	Revenge for the robberies Deegan had committed against Patriarca crime family.
4	Romeo A. Martin	July 9, 1965	
5	Edward McLaughlin	October 16, 1965	Rival gang leader.
6	Raymond DiStasio	November 15, 1965	Refused to pay a debt of $15,000.
7	John B. O'Neal	November 15, 1965	Witness of the murder of Ray DiStasio.
8	Cornelius Hughes	May 25, 1966	Rival gang member.
9	Samuel Lindenbaum	May 25, 1966	Ally of Cornelius Hughes.
10	Stephen Hughes	September 23, 1966	Rival gang member.
11	Clay Wilson	Summer 1970	

== See also ==
- List of prison escapes
- List of unsolved murders (1900–1979)
