= Murder of Edward Deegan =

1965 murder of Edward Charles "Teddy" Deegan

- Location: Chelsea, Massachusetts, U.S.
- Date: 12 March 1965; 61 years ago 9:30 p.m.
- Target: Edward Deegan
- Attack type: Shooting with handgun
- Victim: Edward Deegan
- Perpetrators: Vincent Flemmi and Joseph Barboza
- Motive: Revenge for the robberies Deegan had committed against Patriarca crime family

The murder of Edward Charles "Teddy" Deegan occurred on March 12, 1965. Deegan was shot and killed in an alley next to an office building in Chelsea, Massachusetts, at approximately 9:30 p.m. In 1967, police charged six men with Deegan's murder, and at trial, the prosecution's primary witness was Federal Bureau of Investigation criminal informant Joseph Barboza. On July 31, 1968, the court convicted Louis Greco, Henry Tameleo, Ronald Cassesso and Peter Limone of Deegan's murder, and sentenced them to death. Joseph Salvati and Roy French were sentenced to life imprisonment as accessories to Deegan's murder. In 1997 Salvati's sentence was commuted by Governor William Weld, and in January 2001, a judge overturned Peter Limone and Joe Salvati's convictions after uncovered FBI documents proved their innocence. In 2004, Judge Nancy Gertner ruled that federal lawsuits by the families of Louis Greco, Henry Tameleo, Peter Limone and Joseph Salvati had permission to be filed against the United States Government, and in 2007 a landmark decision ordered the United States Government to pay $101.7 million to the accused and their families for wrongful conviction. The use of FBI informants for the wrongful conviction of four innocent men is noteworthy because it unveiled the corrupt activities that occurred in the FBI during the 1960s.

== Background ==
Edward Deegan
- Born: January 1930; Boston, Massachusetts, U.S.
- Died: March 12, 1965 (aged 35); Chelsea, Massachusetts, U.S.
- Other name: Teddy
- Allegiance: Bonanno crime family

Edward Charles Deegan was born in January 1930. Deegan was part of the Bonanno crime family, and was the maternal uncle of American academic administrator Gerard T. Indelicato, who served as education advisor to Massachusetts Governor Michael Dukakis. Deegan grew up in Boston's West End and became what many true crime authors and criminologists, such as Emily Sweeney, describe as a "career hood" or "local gangster". Edward Deegan's extensive police record goes back to 1948 when he was arrested and charged with larceny. Throughout the 1950s and 1960s Deegan was arrested and charged with break-ins and armed robberies, and in 1959 he was sentenced to six months in the Norfolk County House of Correction. By the 1960s, Deegan had become "a peripheral figure" in the Boston underworld, which at the time had become known for its gangsters and competing hoodlum groups.

== FBI criminal informants ==
A great challenge facing law enforcement in New England during the 1960s was organised gang crime, and one of the FBI's solutions to this was developing criminal informants who would provide the bureau with insider information on criminals and criminal activity. In 1966, Joseph Barboza was persuaded by FBI agent's Paul Rico and Dennis Condon to become a cooperating witness in return for lighter punishment for the crimes he had committed. Barboza's friend, Vincent "Jimmy the Bear" Flemmi had also been recruited as an FBI informant, despite having been accused and charged with numerous murders. Barboza was a member of the Patriarca crime family, who in 1965 were committed to killing Edward Deegan as revenge for the robberies he had committed against the family.

According to a report filed by FBI agent H. Paul Rico on March 10, 1965, two days before Deegan's murder, FBI criminal informant Vincent Flemmi was quoted as saying that he had been in conversation with some of Deegan's associates and they had agreed to set him up to be murdered. The associate Flemmi was referring to was head of the Patriarca family, Raymond Patriarca. According to an airtel from an FBI special agent to FBI Director J. Edgar Hoover, on October 20, 1964, Deegan was called and warned that Vincent Flemmi wanted to shoot him.

== Murder ==
At 11:00 p.m. on March 12, 1965, Edward Deegan's body was found lying on his back, covered in blood, with a twelve-inch screwdriver near his left hand in an alleyway in Chelsea, Massachusetts. Police reports revealed that Deegan was gunned down at approximately 9:30 p.m. while attempting to break into a Chelsea finance company's office building. He had been shot six times, and police believe three different weapons were involved, one .45-caliber and two .38-caliber guns. Within hours of Deegan's death, the Boston field office sent a memorandum to FBI Director J. Edgar Hoover identifying Joseph Barboza, Vincent Flemmi, Ronald "Ronnie the Pig" Cassesso and Wilfred Roy French as present in the alleyway at the scene of the crime.

== Trial ==
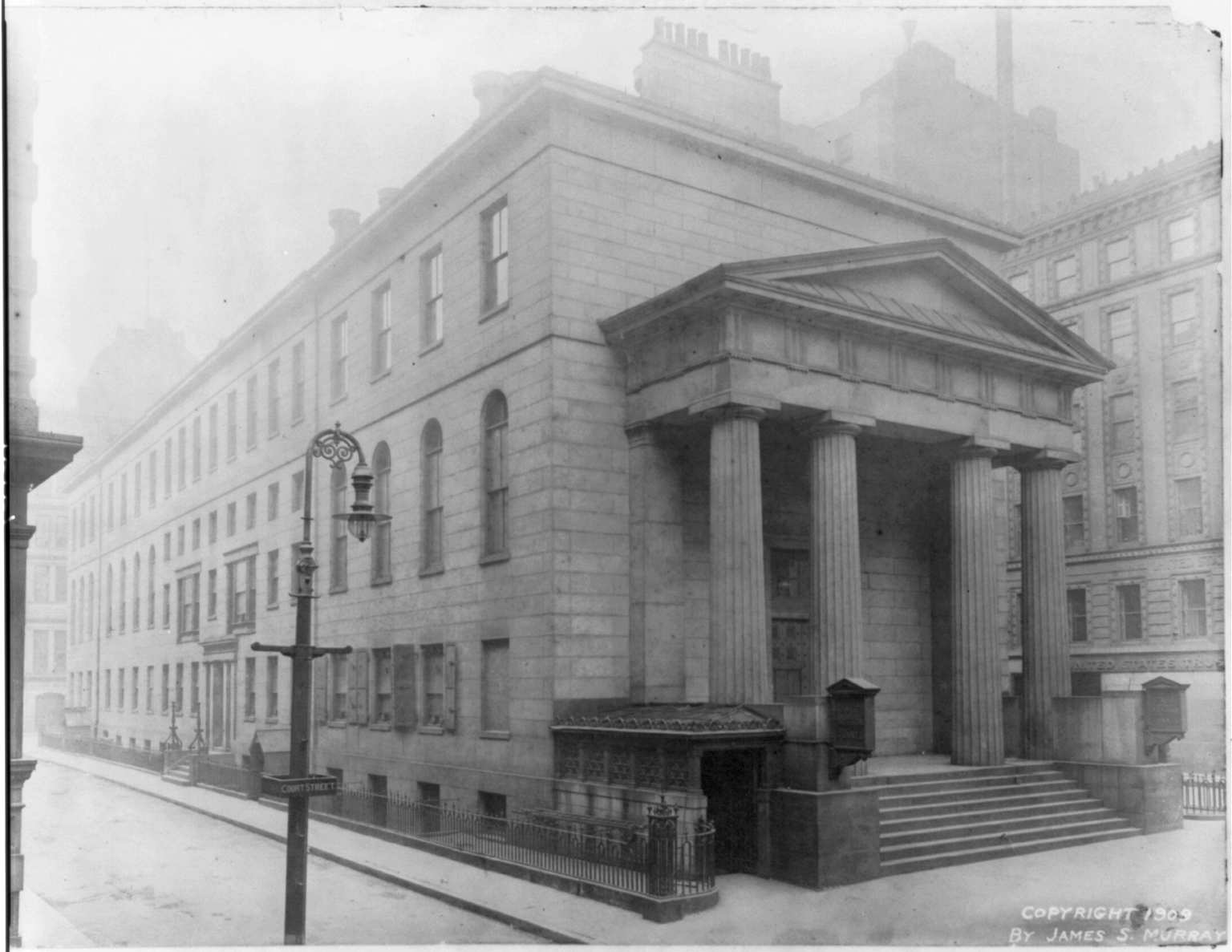
Old Court house (Suffolk County Court House) at Court Street and Court Square

After becoming an informant in 1966, Barboza agreed to testify in the Deegan murder trial. FBI agent Paul Rico promised Roy French and Ronald Cassesso lesser sentences if they corroborated Barboza's false testimony. On October 5, 1967, Joseph Barboza testified about the Deegan murder in court. Barboza informed the Suffolk County Grand Jury of the promises offered to him by the federal government as a criminal informant and told the jury that he and a number of men who were not actually present at the scene of the Deegan murder were responsible for the homicide. Barboza did not provide the jury with any information about Flemmi's involvement in the murder. Barboza testified that on January 20, 1965, Peter Limone told him Edward Deegan's death had been approved by the leader of the Patriarca group, and offered him a $7,500 contract to kill Edward Deegan. According to Barboza, Limone's motive was that Deegan had broken in and stolen eighty-two thousand dollars from him, and therefore he would "pay any amount of money" to have Deegan killed. He testified that he had spoken to Henry Tameleo prior to the murder, and that he was involved in the conspiracy. Barboza also testified that Joseph Salvati wore a wig at the crime scene to make him appear bald, and resemble Jimmy Flemmi. Barboza also implicated Wilfred ‘‘Roy’’ French, Ronald Cassesso and Louise Greco. The chronology of events provided by Barboza, and the recounts he told the grand jury did not match the facts provided to the FBI, making it evident to the FBI that Barboza was committing perjury and using his role as an informant to settle his own scores. Additionally, Barboza implicated Louis Greco was at the scene of the crime in an attempt to protect Vincent Flemmi from being indicted, despite the fact that police had an affidavit proving that Greco was not in Massachusetts during the murder.

A number of individuals were arrested immediately after his testimony, and on May 27, 1968, the Commonwealth of Massachusetts commenced the prosecution against Wilfred French, Peter Limone, Henry Tameleo, Ronald Cassesso, Louis Greco and Joseph Salvati for the murder of Edward Deegan. The court struck a deal with Barboza and agreed to reduce his sentence in return for his cooperation with the FBI and the courts, and file more serious charges against the other men indicated. The prosecution sought the death penalty for all six co-defendants. Louis Greco, Henry Tameleo, Ronald Cassesso, and Peter Limone were convicted of Deegan's murder and sentenced to death. Joseph Salvati and Roy French were sentenced to life imprisonment as accessories to Deegan's murder. In 1972, the sentences of Greco, Tameleo, Cassesso, and Limone were commuted to life in prison as a result of Furman v. Georgia.

In August 1983, the Massachusetts Advisory Board of Pardons suggested to the governor that Limone's sentence be commuted. The petition to have Limone's sentence commuted was supported by Deegan's family who expressed their belief that he was innocent and wrongfully convicted. On September 20, 1983, Governor Dukakis rejected the petition. In 1997, Governor William Weld commuted Joseph Salvati's life sentence to time served, and he was released from prison.

== Overturned convictions ==
In December 2000, the Justice Department decided to investigate corruption in the FBI after allegations of government fraud and coverups. The investigation revealed numerous files that had not been revealed to the parties of the Deegan murder during the trial. These contained information pertaining to the Deegan murder and revealed that Deegan was marked as a target by FBI informants. According to these files, Joseph Barboza, Ronald Cassesso, Jimmy Flemmi and Wilfred French had carried out the murder, and Greco, Limone, Tameleo and Salvati were falsely convicted of the murder with FBI complicity. The investigation also revealed tapes and secret recordings which proved Barboza's testimony in the Deegan trial was inconsistent with the interviews he gave to the FBI. This proved that Federal Bureau of Investigation agents H. Paul Rico, Dennis Condon, John Morris, and John Connolly had knowingly helped convict innocent men in order to protect Vincent "Jimmy The Bear" Flemmi and Joseph Barboza.

According to a report conducted by the Committee on Government Reform in 2004, "The information he provided was contradicted by information already known to federal officials, which rendered Barboza’s testimony suspect. It is inconceivable that federal law enforcement officials did not know what Barboza was going to tell the grand jury and what he did tell the grand jury. Therefore, it is very likely that at least some federal officials understood that Barboza had committed perjury before the Suffolk County grand jury and that he was prepared to provide testimony at trial that was not true."

Whilst Henry Tameleo and Louis Greco died in prison in 1985 and 1995 respectively, Peter Limone and Joseph Salvati's convictions were vacated in January 2001, and they were released from prison after 33 years of incarceration.

== Federal lawsuit ==
In 2001, Peter Limone filed a $300 million federal lawsuit against the United States Government. Louis Greco's son and relatives of Tameleo also filed separate lawsuits, asking for up to $75 million in damages each. In 2002, Joseph Salvati filled a $300 million federal lawsuit. All four lawsuits were for the wrongful conviction of the defendants and the malicious prosecution they had incurred. On September 17, 2004, a federal judge allowed the lawsuits to proceed since "the state prosecution of Limone, Greco, Salvati, and Tameleo was procured by the FBI and nurtured by both federal agents and state officers who knew that the charges were bogus".

In early 2007, the court commenced proceedings for the lawsuit, with Greco, Tameleo, Salvati and Limone's lawyers placing blame on the FBI for their client's wrongful imprisonment and urging the judge to compensate their families. Indiana Republican and member of Congress Dan Burton, and Congress members William D. Delahunt and Stephen F. Lynch had condemned the FBI's mishandling of informants during their involvement in the investigation, and were present in court during the case. On July 26, 2007, U.S. District Judge Nancy Gertner held that the FBI assisted Barboza in framing four men for Deegan's murder, and withheld information for decades that could have cleared them. The US Government were to pay the wrongly accused $101.7 million in damages for their wrongful conviction, which, at the time, was the "single largest sum ever awarded from the federal government under the Federal Tort Claims Act." $13 million of this settlement went to Henry Tameleo's estate, specifically his son and wife.

In his 2007 publication, radio talk show host Howie Carr discussed the events that had occurred, saying, "For the FBI, it was more important to keep Vincent, and later Barboza, on the street as informants than it was to prevent the framing of innocent men. In fact, the railroading of the four men served two purposes for the FBI, it would enable Vincent and Joseph Barboza to escape conviction for a murder they had committed, and it would also remove several Patriarca crime family members or associates from the criminal world that the FBI had not been able to eliminate in a legal manner".

== See also ==
- List of homicides in Massachusetts
