= Joseph Russo (mobster) =

American mobster (1931–1998)

- Russo's mugshot
- Born: Joseph Anthony Russo; May 5, 1931; Boston, Massachusetts, U.S.
- Died: June 1, 1998 (aged 67); Springfield, Missouri, U.S.
- Other name: "J.R."
- Occupation: Mobster
- Relatives: Robert Carrozza (stepbrother)
- Allegiance: Patriarca crime family
- Conviction: Racketeering (1992)
- Penalty: 16 years' imprisonment (1992)

Joseph Anthony Russo (May 5, 1931 – June 1, 1998), known as "J.R.", was an American mobster in the Patriarca crime family of New England. He gained infamy as the hit man who killed the informant Joseph Barboza, the first person to be murdered while in the Federal Witness Protection Program. As a caporegime in the Boston faction of the Patriarca family, Russo led a failed rebellion against the family boss, Raymond Patriarca Jr. of Providence, Rhode Island, during the late 1980s. As part of a truce, Patriarca promoted Russo to consigliere of the family. Russo was convicted of racketeering in 1992 and died in federal prison from cancer.

== Criminal career ==
Russo grew up in East Boston and came to control organized crime in the neighborhood. He was the stepbrother of the mobster Robert "Bobby Russo" Carrozza. Russo had a reputation as a dapper, well-dressed mafioso. He formed a partnership with another East Boston hoodlum, Vincent DeSciscio, and the duo became known as "the Gold Dust Twins". As head of the East Boston faction of the Patriarca crime family, Russo utilized Carrozza and Anthony "Spucky" Spagnolo, a protégé of his, as a collection team.

Russo was an enforcer and "hit man" for the Mafia. He was assigned by Patriarca family underboss Gennaro "Jerry" Angiulo to kill the hit man-turned-government witness Joseph "the Animal" Barboza, whose testimony had resulted in the convictions of numerous gangsters, including New England Mafia boss Raymond "the Man" Patriarca, and the indictment of Angiulo. Russo traveled to California with Spagnolo to track down Barboza. According to informants, Russo shotgunned Barboza to death on a street corner in the Sunset District of San Francisco on February 11, 1976 while Spagnolo acted as a lookout and getaway driver in a white van. Barboza became the first person to be murdered while in the Federal Witness Protection Program. As such, Russo attained a degree of notoriety in the criminal underworld. The mobster Ilario "Larry Baione" Zannino referred to him as "a genius with a fucking carbine". The journalist Kevin Cullen called Russo "the Bobby Thomson of the Boston mob". As a suspect in the Barboza murder, Russo spent the majority of the following decade in hiding before returning to Boston. Russo sponsored Spagnolo for membership in the Patriarca family in the early 1980s.

=== Mafia war ===
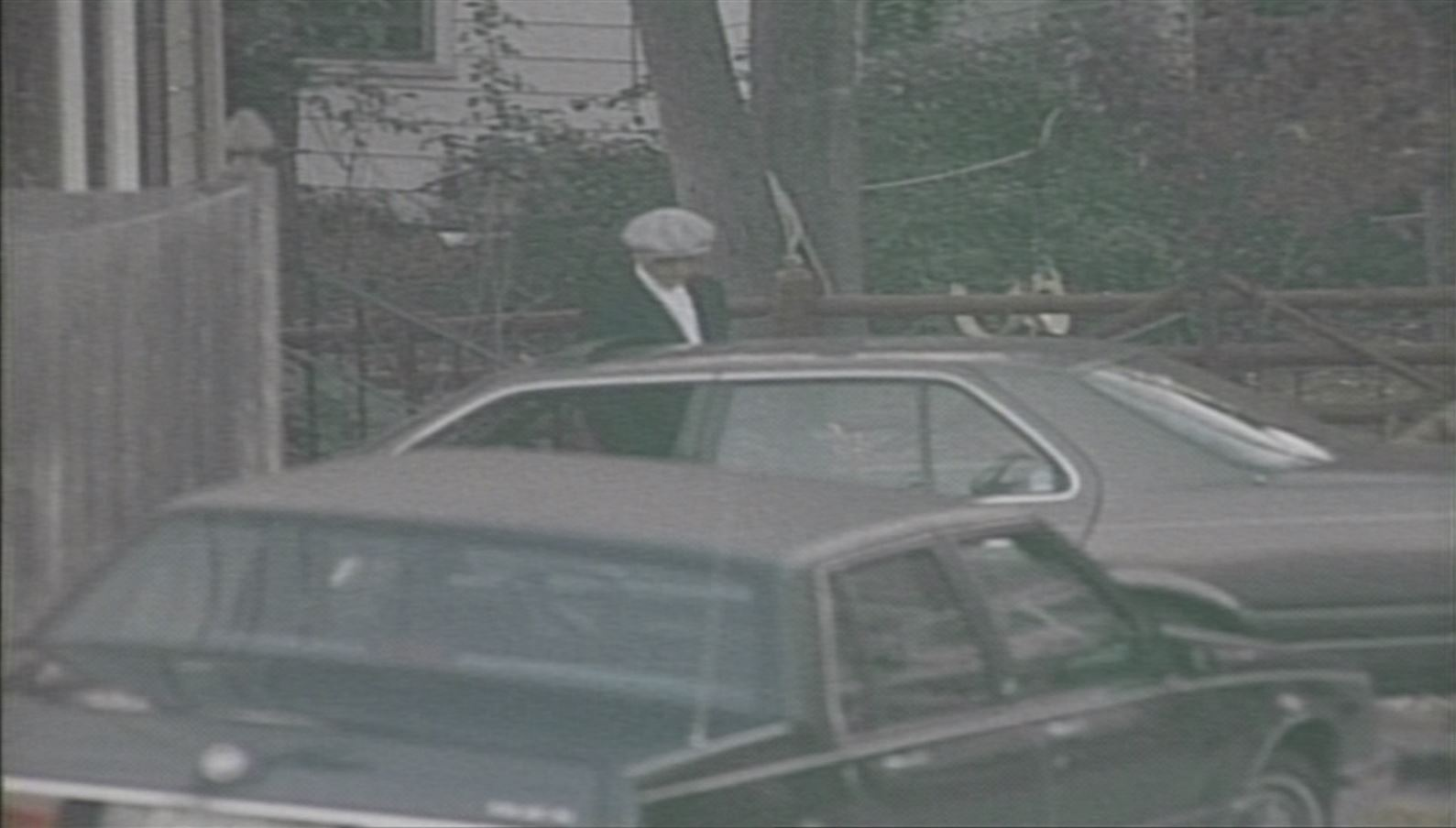
FBI surveillance photo of Russo in 1989

Raymond "Junior" Patriarca Jr. of Providence, Rhode Island took over the leadership of the Patriarca family following the death of his father, Raymond Patriarca Sr., in 1984. In 1986, Jerry Angiulo, the dominant Mafia figure in Boston, was convicted of racketeering along with his three brothers and an associate and sentenced to 45 years in federal prison. Russo subsequently succeeded Angiulo as the most senior mobster in the Boston faction of the family. By early 1987, the New England Mafia was on the verge of civil war as Russo headed a renegade faction which sought to take control of the family from Patriarca. Russo threatened to personally to kill Patriarca if he did not cede his power to Russo, but Patriarca refused to abdicate his position.

Russo aligned with fellow Boston caporegime Vincent "the Animal" Ferrara, who controlled the Mafia crew formerly headed by Donato "Danny" Angiulo, as well as disillusioned mobsters from Hartford, Connecticut and Springfield, Massachusetts, to lead an unsuccessful rebellion against Patriarca, whose faction included William "Billy the Wild Man" Grasso and Francis "Cadillac Frank" Salemme. The coup attempt ignited a period of infighting within the family. On June 16, 1989, Salemme survived a shooting outside a Saugus pancake house, and Grasso, Patriarca's underboss, was found shot dead floating in the Connecticut River in Wethersfield, Connecticut.

In the months following the shootings of Grasso and Salemme, Patriarca negotiated a truce with Russo. Patriarca agreed to elevate Russo from capo to consigliere, or counselor, of the family. The promotion allowed Russo to induct new "made" members into his Boston-based crew. The gang war ceased temporarily in the fall of 1989, and a conciliatory Mafia induction ceremony of four Russo and Ferrara loyalists presided over by Patriarca was conducted at a house in suburban Medford on October 29, 1989. The ceremony was secretly recorded by the Federal Bureau of Investigation (FBI) with the assistance of the informant Angelo "Sonny" Mercurio. Russo's raspy, nasal voice featured heavily on the recordings as he was taped by a concealed microphone. Russo was recorded telling the inductees: "This thing you're in, it's going to be a life of heaven". The scandal of allowing an initiation ceremony to be infiltrated forced Patriarca to resign as boss, and he was replaced by Nicholas "Nicky" Bianco, the highest-ranking Patriarca family mobster who was not in attendance at the event.

=== Arrest and imprisonment ===
On the afternoon of November 14, 1989, Russo was arrested and charged with violation and conspiracy to violate the federal Hobbs Act in relation to the 1987 extortion of Harry "Doc" Sagansky, an elderly Boston-area bookmaker. Russo was taken into custody along with Ferrara as the mobsters left a meeting at a social club in Boston's North End. Carrozza was also arrested in East Boston. The arrests followed a three-year investigation by the New England Organized Crime Strike Force, involving the FBI, the Massachusetts State Police, and the Boston Police Department. On March 26, 1990, Russo was indicted on racketeering charges along with twenty other Patriarca family members and associates after a five-year FBI operation.

Russo acted as his own attorney at his trial, dressing in dark suits and white shirts with long, pointed collars. Impressed with Russo's ability as a lawyer, U.S. District Judge Mark L. Wolf, who presided over the trial, told the mobster: "You speak beautifully, and I'm not sure any lawyer could have been more discriminating in picking points to argue." Russo and four of his co-defendants, including Carrozza and Ferrara, reached a plea deal with federal prosecutors in January 1992, pleading guilty to racketeering charges including murder, extortion, drug dealing and kidnapping. The conviction included the murder of Barboza. On April 29, 1992, Wolf sentenced Russo to 16 years in prison. The judge praised the "admirable" traits of Russo and his co-defendants, describing the mobsters as having displayed "intelligence, industry, loyalty to friends and a strong sense of family". Wolf speculated that Russo would have preferred to go to trial but agreed to plead guilty "out of loyalty" to his co-defendants, whose deal with prosecutors was dependent on unanimous guilty pleas, and told Russo: "It probably took more courage for you to plead guilty than to get gunned down in an alley."

After Russo's imprisonment, the North Shore mobster Charles "Cue Ball" Quintana became the new consigliere of the Patriarca family.

== Death ==
Russo battled cancer in prison and was transferred to the U.S. Medical Center for Federal Prisoners in Springfield, Missouri in April 1998. He died from throat cancer at the age of 67 on June 1, 1998. Russo was buried at Boston's Westwood Cemetery.
