= Frank Salemme =

American criminal (1933–2022)

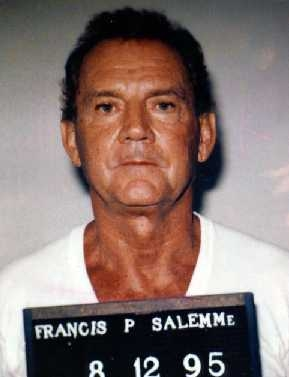
- Salemme's August 12, 1995 FBI mugshot
- Born: Francis Patrick Salemme; August 18, 1933; Weymouth, Massachusetts, U.S.
- Died: December 13, 2022 (aged 89); Springfield, Missouri, U.S.
- Other names: "Cadillac Frank"; "The General"; "Julian Daniel Selig"; "Richard Parker"
- Occupation: Crime boss
- Predecessor: Nicholas Bianco
- Successor: Luigi Manocchio
- Allegiance: Patriarca crime family
- Convictions: Attempted murder (1973); Racketeering (1995); Perjury; Making false statements Murder (2018)
- Penalty: 16 years imprisonment (1973) 11 years imprisonment (1995); 5 years imprisonment (2008); Life imprisonment (2018)

Francis Patrick Salemme (pronounced sah-LEM-ee; August 18, 1933 – December 13, 2022), sometimes spelled Salemmi, also known as "Cadillac Frank" and "the General", was an American mobster from Boston, Massachusetts who became a hitman and eventually the boss of the Patriarca crime family of New England before turning government witness.

== Early life ==
Salemme was born on August 18, 1933, in Weymouth, Massachusetts, in the Greater Boston area, the second of six children of an Irish American mother, Mary Agnes (née Hagerty), a homemaker, and an Italian American father, Romeo Pasquale Salemme, a ship painter. His younger brother, John, also became a mobster. Salemme was raised in the Jamaica Plain neighborhood of Boston.

Salemme served in the U.S. Army during the Korean War and became a licensed electrician after receiving an honorable discharge. He married Alice Kathleen McLaughlin in Nashua, New Hampshire on November 16, 1955.

== Criminal career ==
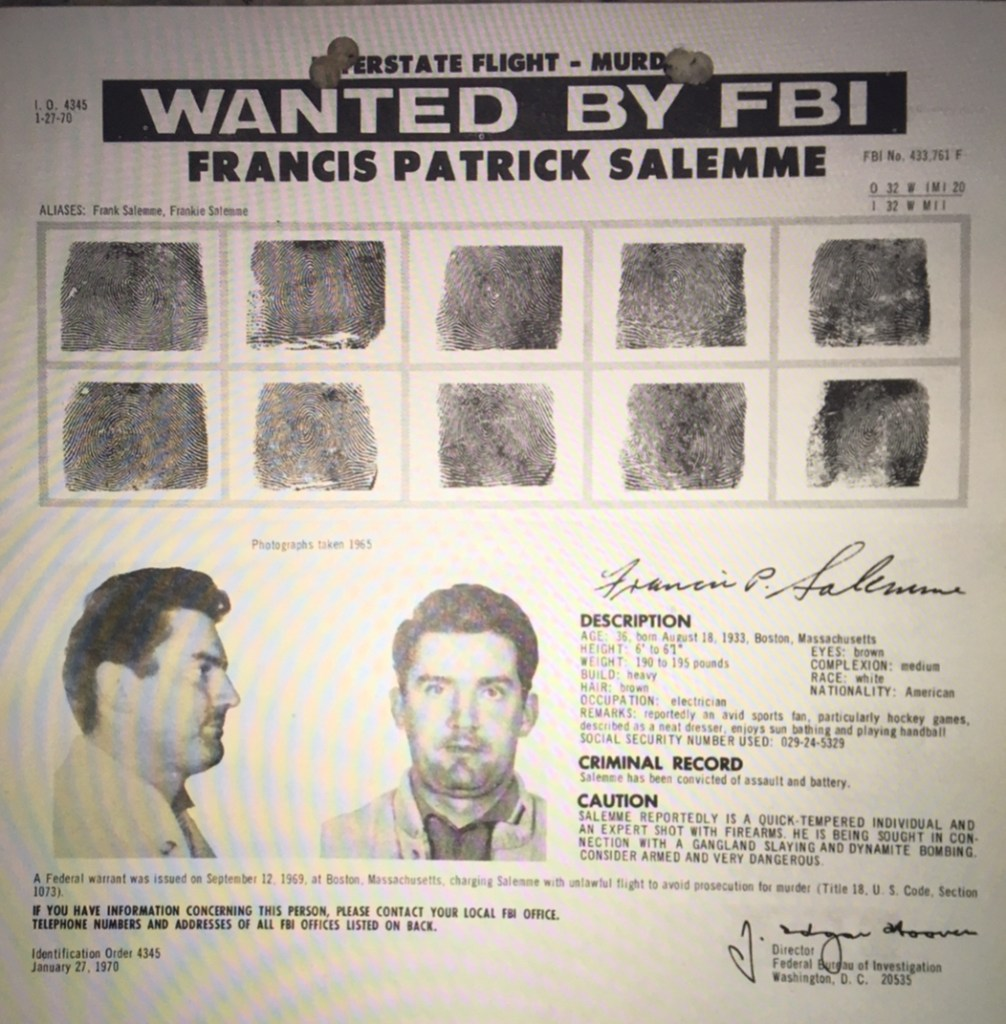
FBI Wanted Poster of Francis Patrick Salemme issued on January 27, 1970

While in prison in 1957, Salemme became acquainted with Anthony Morelli, a member of the Patriarca crime family which controlled organized crime throughout New England. He began working for the family as a low-level associate after his release from prison. Salemme operated a number of semi-legitimate businesses such as automobile repair garages in partnership with George Kaufman, who served as the liaison between the Mafia and Boston's Jewish bookmakers. Salemme earned the nickname "Cadillac Frank" when he worked in an auto repair shop and specialized in repairing Cadillac automobiles.

Salemme began associating with a group of gangsters from Boston's Roxbury neighborhood, which included his childhood friend Stephen "the Rifleman" Flemmi. Salemme and Flemmi formed a partnership, and the duo became enforcers, bookmakers and loan sharks for the Patriarca family caporegime Ilario "Larry Baione" Zannino in the North End of Boston. Salemme grew so close to Flemmi that he named his son Stephen Salemme after him. Unknown to Salemme, however, Flemmi was a confidential informant for the Federal Bureau of Investigation (FBI) who provided the bureau with information on Salemme and others in the Patriarca family.

During the early 1960s, Salemme participated in the Irish gang wars in Boston, allying himself with the Winter Hill Gang against the Charlestown Gang. Testifying before Congress in 2003, Salemme admitted to murdering numerous rival gang members in Charlestown, Massachusetts:

The Hugheses, the McLaughlins, they were all eliminated, and I was a participant in just about all of them, planned them and did them.

In the summer of 1967, Zannino and Peter Limone decided to sponsor Salemme and Flemmi for membership in the Patriarca family. Although prospective members would ordinarily be required to carry out a murder in order to be inducted into the Mafia, the family offered to waive the requirement due to Salemme and Flemmi's reputation as seasoned killers. While Salemme was unequivocal in his enthusiasm for joining the Patriarca family, Flemmi had an ambivalent relationship with the Mafia. Salemme's partial Irish ancestry ultimately prevented him from becoming a "made man", however.

In 1968, Salemme arranged the car bombing of John Fitzgerald, a lawyer representing Patriarca mob informant Joseph Barboza. The point of the attack was to scare Barboza into not testifying against Raymond Patriarca and other mob leaders. Fitzgerald survived the attack, but lost his left leg. It was later established in testimony by several witnesses and confirmed by the U.S. House of Representatives Organized Crime unit investigation that Salemme was involved in the bombing, but did not carry it out. After the unsuccessful attack, Salemme went into hiding using the identity of "Jules Sellick", a reputed Philadelphia jewelry salesman. He remained a fugitive until December 1972, when he was captured by FBI agent John Connolly on Third Avenue in Manhattan. He was convicted of attempted murder and sentenced to 16 years in state prison in 1973.

=== Mob rivalry ===
Salemme was released from prison in February 1988 after serving almost 15 years of his sentence. At the time, the Patriarca family was in the midst of a generational transition and leadership struggle. Raymond Patriarca Sr. had died of a heart attack in 1984, and in 1986, underboss Gennaro "Jerry" Angiulo was sent to prison on racketeering charges, leaving a power vacuum in the crime family. Salemme was a pivotal member of a faction loyal to Raymond "Junior" Patriarca Jr., who succeeded his father as boss of the New England Mafia. Salemme also maintained links to the Winter Hill Gang led by James "Whitey" Bulger and Stephen Flemmi, to whom he was especially close. The Providence, Rhode Island-based Patriarca Jr. isolated the crime family's Boston faction headed by Joseph "J. R." Russo, and he relied on Salemme and New Haven, Connecticut mobster William "Billy the Wild Guy" Grasso for protection. Salemme's ties to the Winter Hill Gang made him particularly valuable to Patriarca Jr., who appointed him his point man in Boston.

Although Salemme had previously been restricted from joining the Patriarca family as a "made" member because of his partial Irish ancestry, the threshold for membership in the organization was later reduced as a result of the decimation of the crime family's ranks by law enforcement and infighting. Salemme was inducted into the Patriarca family during an initiation ceremony conducted by Raymond Patriarca Jr. in Providence in July 1988. By 1989, he had been promoted to caporegime. Among other criminal activities, Salemme oversaw a "crew" which identified and extorted bookmakers and loansharks in Framingham, Worcester, and Milford. He was often accompanied by his son, Frank Salemme Jr., who was also inducted as a "made man". Salemme and underboss Grasso became the de facto leaders of Patriarca Jr.'s wing of the crime family.

In early 1989, soon after his release from prison, Salemme attempted to gain control of the Patriarca family. Patriarca caporegime Joseph Russo opposed Salemme's move, fearing the loss of his lucrative rackets. In June 1989, Angelo "Sonny" Mercurio, a Russo loyalist, lured Salemme to a meeting outside a Saugus, Massachusetts IHOP. Gunmen then ambushed Salemme, wounding him in the chest and leg. The feud between Salemme and Russo continued until John Gotti, the boss of the New York Gambino crime family, brokered a peace agreement. Under the agreement, Salemme loyalist Nicholas Bianco became boss and Russo became consigliere. By 1991 Salemme, with the support of Bulger and Flemmi, had become the de facto boss of the Patriarca family.

In Southern California, Salemme Sr. and his son ran up more than $55,000 in bills at various hotels, which they avoided paying thanks to a scam operated by San Diego attorney Fred Henry Arm.

=== Mob boss ===
During the 1990s, at the urging of Frank Salemme, Jr., Frank, Sr. started extorting money from a film crew that wanted to avoid paying high salaries to union workers while filming in Boston and Providence, Rhode Island. As it turned out, the film crew was actually a Federal Bureau of Investigation (FBI) front. These events were highly fictionalized in the 2004 film The Last Shot. At the end of the operation, Frank, Sr. was arrested in Fort Lauderdale, Florida and charged with racketeering, crossing state lines for criminal activity, extortion, conspiracy, and loansharking.

Salemme financed a deal to take over The Channel, a nightclub and music venue in the Fort Point neighborhood of South Boston, using club and restaurant owner Stephen "Stevie" DiSarro as a straw buyer. While the deal was pending, the club's owners, Harry and Pete Booras, allowed DiSarro to take over the running of the club as manager, with Frank Salemme Jr. as assistant manager in September 1990. After the sale was completed and the venue was reopened as strip club Soiree in early 1992, Salemme and DiSarro reneged on an agreement allowing the Booras brothers a minority stake in the business, instead giving the minority ownership interest to South Boston crime lords Whitey Bulger and Stephen Flemmi, who assisted in ensuring that the club received zoning, licensing and permitting from the local municipality.

=== Downfall ===
In April 1994, a joint task force of the Drug Enforcement Administration (DEA), the Massachusetts State Police, and the Boston Police Department launched an investigation into the gambling operations of the Winter Hill Gang. By the end of the year, the task force had amassed enough evidence to indict Salemme, Bulger and Flemmi on 35 counts of racketeering and extortion. On December 23, 1994, Bulger and Flemmi's former FBI handler, John Connolly, tipped off the gangsters about the impending indictments, prompting Salemme and Bulger to flee Boston.

The task force planned to arrest Salemme, Bulger and Flemmi in a series of raids on January 5, 1995. Only Flemmi was taken into custody, however, as the other two had already absconded. Salemme and his common-law wife, Donna Wolf, fled to Florida, taking up residence in a West Palm Beach town house. Salemme initially remained elusive as a fugitive, even skipping the funeral of his namesake son, Francis "Frankie Boy" Salemme Jr, who died of AIDS-related leukemia on June 23, 1995. After he was profiled on America's Most Wanted, however, several sightings of Salemme were reported in South Florida. Just before midnight on August 11, 1995, Salemme was arrested in his pajamas by the FBI at his West Palm Beach home. He was subsequently extradited to Boston.

== Government witness ==
On December 9, 1999, Salemme pleaded guilty to a racketeering indictment charging him with loansharking, extortion and four murders; those of Richard Grasso, and the brothers William, Walter and Edward "Wimpy" Bennett. As part of the plea deal, the murder charges were dismissed. During earlier hearings in the case, it was revealed that both Bulger and Flemmi had been FBI informants for many years, and that both men had provided information on Salemme to their FBI handlers. Explaining Salemme's decision to plead guilty after four years of hearings, his defense attorney, Anthony M. Cardinale, said: "Essentially he was tired of sitting next to Steve Flemmi. He spent 17 years in jail because of Flemmi's treachery, then when he got out he got shot because of Flemmi's treachery".

Salemme was sentenced to 11 years' imprisonment. He agreed to provide the government with information on the FBI handling of Bulger and Flemmi. Salemme's testimony would help convict Connolly, the same man who had arrested him 20 years earlier in New York, on racketeering charges. In 2003, in return for assisting the government, Salemme was released early from prison and brought into the federal witness protection program. Shortly after his release, Salemme appeared before a Congressional committee to testify on the Connolly case.

Salemme left the witness protection program in early 2004. On November 9, 2004, he was arrested and charged with obstruction of justice and making false statements when he denied any knowledge about the disappearance of a nightclub owner named Steven A. DiSarro.

In 2008, he was sentenced to five years in prison after pleading guilty to charges of obstruction of justice and making false statements for lying to federal authorities investigating the disappearance of 43-year-old Steven DiSarro, who went missing in 1993.

=== 2018 murder conviction ===
During the trial of retired FBI agent John Connolly, Salemme denied murdering DiSarro in 1994. Two years later, however, Steve Flemmi was immunized and told U.S. attorneys Fred Wyshak and Brian Kelly that he saw Salemme participate in the murder. Salemme went back to jail when he was finished testifying against Connolly, and there he bragged to a fellow inmate that the prosecutors had coached him to commit perjury and that he had committed so much perjury that he should be sentenced to jail for a hundred years. The inmate was an informant who wrote down his confession and it is memorialized in law enforcement reports. Instead of charging Salemme with the murder of DiSarro, Wyshak and Kelly merely charged him with perjury and obstruction. A secret plea bargain was struck and he was sentenced to just over time already served.

On June 22, 2018, Salemme was convicted of the murder of Steven A. DiSarro. DiSarro's remains were unearthed from behind a mill-turned-apartments in Wanskuck, Providence, Rhode Island, on March 31, 2016. Patriarca mob associate William Ricci, who owned the apartment complex, faced gun and drug charges after authorities found over 1,400 marijuana plants and a stolen handgun at the property around August 2015; three weeks after a plea deal was worked out, the remains were recovered at the property. Judge Allison D. Burroughs sentenced Salemme and former Patriarca crime family associate and accomplice, Paul Weadick, to life in prison on September 13, 2018. According to former Winter Hill Gang member and Whitey Bulger associate, Stephen Flemmi, Salemme stood by and watched as his son strangled DiSarro while Weadick held his legs. According to authorities, Salemme believed DiSarro was informing on him after he was contacted by authorities in the investigation of Salemme's illegal activity within The Channel nightclub. Assistant U.S. Attorney Fred Wyshak said that Salemme admitted to murdering eight people during the 1960s, and was suspected of involvement in six additional murders in the early 1990s.

Salemme was later held at the United States Medical Center for Federal Prisoners.

== Death ==
On December 13, 2022, Frank Salemme died at MCFP Springfield, at the age of 89.

American Mafia
Preceded by Nicholas Bianco	Patriarca crime family Boss; 1991–1996	Succeeded by Luigi Manocchio
