= Stephen Flemmi =

American convicted murderer (born 1934)

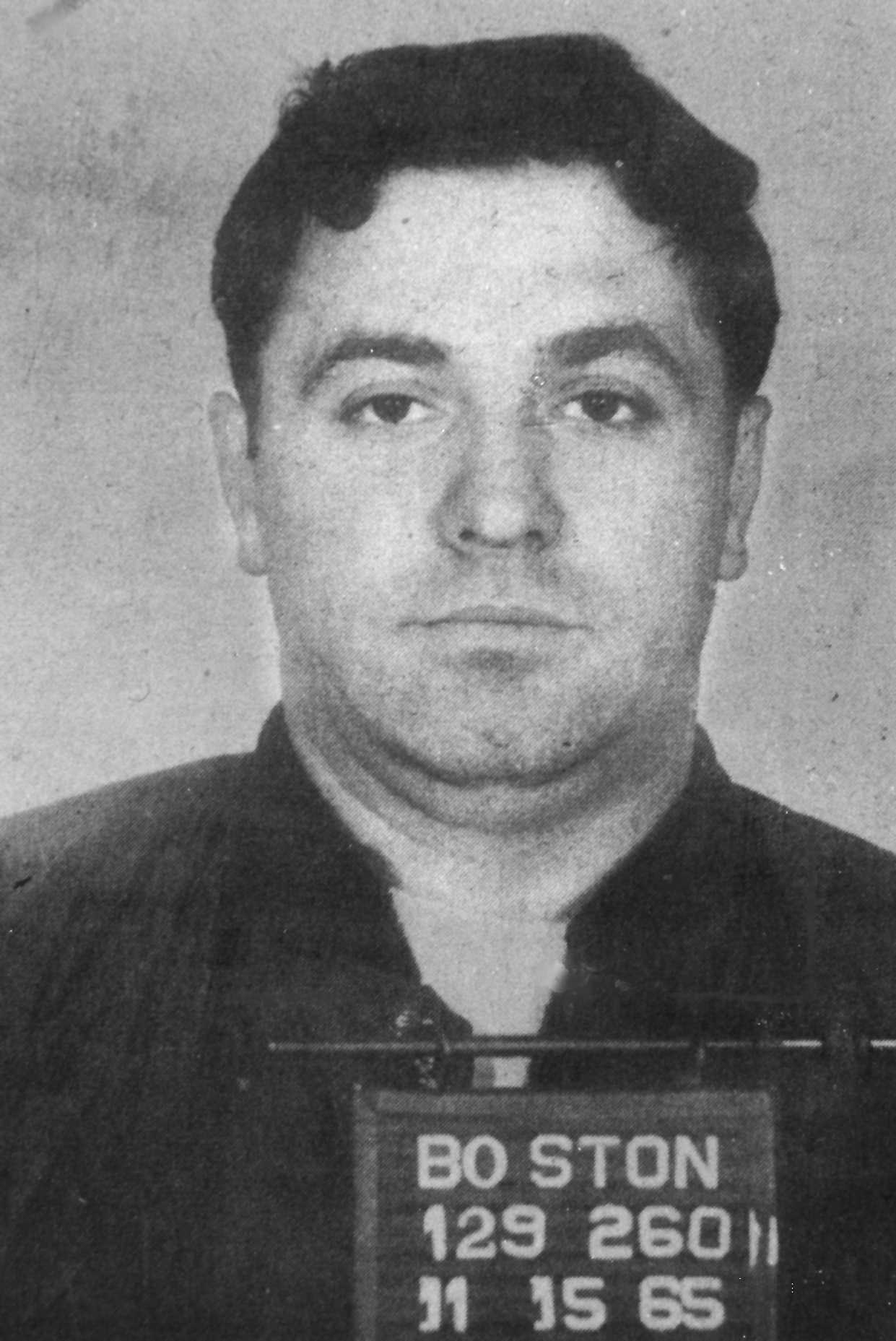
- Flemmi's November 15, 1965 mugshot
- Born: Stephen Joseph Flemmi; June 9, 1934 (age 92); Boston, Massachusetts, U.S.
- Other names: "The Rifleman"; "The Nice Guy"; "Dr. Mengele"; "Stevie Flemming"
- Occupation: Mobster
- Children: 5
- Relatives: Michael Flemmi (brother); Vincent Flemmi (brother)
- Status: Incarcerated
- Allegiance: Winter Hill Gang
- Conviction: Murder
- Penalty: Life imprisonment (2003)
- Military career
- Allegiance: United States
- Branch: United States Army
- Service years: 1951–1955
- Rank: Corporal
- Units: 187th Infantry Regiment, 101st Airborne Division
- Conflicts: Korean War
- Awards: Silver Star; Bronze Star Medal

Stephen Joseph Flemmi (born June 9, 1934) is an American former mobster and convicted murderer and was a close associate of Winter Hill Gang boss Whitey Bulger. Beginning in 1975, Flemmi was a top echelon informant for the Federal Bureau of Investigation (FBI).

Despite delivering a great deal of intelligence about the inner workings of the Patriarca crime family, Flemmi's own criminal activities proved a public relations nightmare for the FBI. He was ultimately brought up on charges under the Racketeer Influenced and Corrupt Organizations Act, and pleaded guilty in return for a sentence of life in prison.

== Early life ==
Stephen Joseph Flemmi was the eldest of three sons (the two brothers were Michael Flemmi and Vincent Flemmi) born to Italian American parents Giovanni "John" Flemmi (1892–1991), an immigrant from Bari, Apulia, and Mary Irene (née Misserville) Flemmi (1912–2000), who was born in Massachusetts to a family from Ceccano, Lazio. He was raised in the Orchard Park tenement located at 25 Ambrose Street in the Roxbury neighborhood of Boston, Massachusetts. His father was a bricklayer and veteran of the Royal Italian Army during World War I, and his mother was a full-time homemaker.

Flemmi was first arrested at the age of 15 on a charge of carnal abuse, and he later served time in a juvenile detention facility for assault. He enlisted in the Army in 1951 at the age of 17 and served two tours of duty in Korea with the 187th Airborne Regimental Combat Team. Flemmi was awarded the Silver Star and Bronze Star Medal decorations for valor and honorably discharged in 1955.

== Criminal career ==
After leaving the military, Stephen Flemmi, along with his brother Vincent, joined the Roxbury Gang in the late 1950s. The gang was led by the brothers Walter, William and Edward "Wimpy" Bennett and controlled bookmaking and drug dealing in the Roxbury and South End neighborhoods of Boston. Flemmi became a protégé of Walter and "Wimpy" Bennett, taking and collecting bets for the brothers' numbers racket, which they ran from their headquarters at Walter's Lounge, a Dudley Street nightclub. A handsome, soft-spoken and slender man of around 5-feet-8 and 140 pounds, Flemmi operated out of the Marconi Club, a combination bookmaker's, massage parlor and brothel, in Roxbury. Although he had a reputation as a ruthless killer, Flemmi was a popular man who was fond of nightlife, cars and the company of young women.

Flemmi, along with his mentors Walter and "Wimpy" Bennett, became a confidential informant for the Boston Police Department detective William "Bill" Stuart, who offered protection to the gangsters in exchange for information on their criminal rivals. In September 1964, Stuart saved the lives of Stephen Flemmi and his brother Vincent by intervening at gunpoint to stop the hoodlum William McCarthy from gunning down the pair. McCarthy had sought revenge on the Flemmi brothers after Vincent Flemmi had killed his associate, Leo Lowry.

During the 1960s, gang warfare erupted in Boston and across New England, with Irish and Italian gangsters battling over control of lucrative criminal rackets. The fiercest fighting involved two rival Irish mob groups, the Winter Hill Gang and the Charlestown Gang. Flemmi and his friends Joseph "the Animal" Barboza and Francis "Cadillac Frank" Salemme were recruited by the Winter Hill Gang and fulfilled a string of lucrative murder contracts during the gang wars. In addition to his links with Irish gangsters in Somerville, Flemmi associated with the Italian Mafia. Flemmi formed a partnership with his childhood friend Salemme, and the duo became enforcers, bookmakers and loan sharks for the Patriarca crime family in Boston's North End.

Flemmi was recruited as an informant for the Federal Bureau of Investigation (FBI) in the mid-1960s, adopting the code name "Jack from South Boston". The FBI later referred to Flemmi as "Shogun". By the fall of 1965, Flemmi was being supervised by the FBI agent H. Paul Rico. Rico had cultivated Flemmi as an informant due to his association with the Patriarca family. Because of Flemmi's ability to provide information on the family's leadership, Rico had him designated a Top Echelon informant, the highest status an FBI source can achieve. Flemmi described his relationship with Rico and his partner, Dennis Condon, as "quid pro quo". Due to the shifting alliances and ongoing killings during the gang wars, Flemmi's life was constantly under threat, and he relied on Rico to alert him to any threats he may have learned from other informants. Because of Flemmi's usefulness as an informant, Rico overlooked Flemmi's criminal activities. By the late 1960s, Flemmi was a suspect in several murders, but the FBI chose not to question him about the killings.

Rico leaked information to members of the Winter Hill Gang which allowed them to track down and kill rival gangsters. Rico had been offended when he heard the Charlestown gangster Edward "Punchy" McLaughlin refer to Rico and his boss, J. Edgar Hoover, as "fags" on an illegal wiretap, and, in retaliation, alerted McLaughlin's rivals of his location. Flemmi and Salemme first attempted to murder McLaughlin when they shotgunned him in the parking lot of Beth Israel Hospital while disguised as rabbis. McLaughlin had his jaw blown off but survived. On the second attempt, Flemmi and Salemme fired upon McLaughlin with machine guns during an ambush as he arrived at a girlfriend's house in Weston. Although the pair missed their target, Howard "Howie" Winter shot McLaughlin's hand off with a scoped .308 Winchester rifle before he fled. McLaughlin was finally killed by two gunmen on a bus in West Roxbury on October 20, 1965. Flemmi and Salemme were alleged to be the two shooters.

=== Bennett murders and Fitzgerald bombing ===
Although Flemmi's first gangland boss, "Wimpy" Bennett, had vowed to remain neutral in a feud between the Patriarca family and an East Boston crew headed by Barboza, a rivalry persisted between Bennett and Ilario "Larry" Zannino, Flemmi and Salemme's closest contact in the Mafia. Flemmi and Salemme shot and killed the brothers "Wimpy" and Walter Bennett in succession. At the behest of Zannino, 47-year-old "Wimpy" Bennett was murdered in a garage owned by Salemme on January 19, 1967. After Bennett disappeared, Flemmi notified his FBI handler Rico that there was "absolutely no chance" that he would be found alive. 55-year-old Walter Bennett then went missing on April 3, 1967 after he had been deemed a threat to Flemmi. Both men were buried at a remote location in Hopkinton.

When the third Bennett brother, William "Billy" Bennett, "began vocalizing his belief that Flemmi had murdered both his brothers", Flemmi "reluctantly decided" that he too must be killed. 56-year-old Billy Bennett was dumped from a moving car and found dead against a snowbank in the Mattapan neighborhood of Boston on December 22, 1967 after getting into a vehicle with Richard Grasso, an associate from South Boston. Stuart assisted Flemmi in post-killing cleaning after Bennett's murder. A week later, Grasso was shot twice in the head and left in the trunk of his 1967 Buick Wildcat in Brookline. Grasso was killed by Flemmi after he had "panicked" because his car was used in Billy Bennett's murder. After the killings of the Bennett brothers, Flemmi assumed control of the Roxbury Gang.

In the summer of 1967, Zannino and Peter Limone decided to sponsor Flemmi and Salemme for membership in the Patriarca family. Although prospective members would ordinarily be required to carry out a murder in order to be inducted into the Mafia, the family offered to waive the requirement due to Flemmi and Salemme's reputation as seasoned killers. In the winter of 1967, Flemmi was summoned to Providence, Rhode Island to meet with Patriarca family boss Raymond Patriarca. Unlike Salemme, Flemmi ultimately resisted the family's attempts to recruit him as he did not trust the Mafia and felt he had sufficient protection as an FBI informant.

Flemmi was instrumental in Rico's efforts to develop Barboza into a cooperating witness for the government against the Patriarca family. After Barboza turned state's evidence, Raymond Patriarca ordered the murders of potential witnesses who might corroborate Barboza's testimony as well as Barboza's attorney, John E. Fitzgerald. On January 30, 1968, Flemmi and Salemme planted a car bomb under the hood of Fitzgerald's Cadillac automobile in Everett. Fitzgerald survived but lost his lower right leg in the explosion. According to Rico, in May 1968, Flemmi killed and buried Thomas Timmons, who had been involved in a dispute with the Patrarca family.

In September 1969, Flemmi was indicted by clandestine grand juries in two Massachusetts counties. He was charged in Suffolk County with the murder of William Bennett, and, along with Salemme, in Middlesex County with the attempted murder of Fitzgerald. After Flemmi was tipped off by Rico about the imminent indictments, he, Salemme and Peter Poulos, an associate of "Wimpy" Bennett in the South End who had witnessed Bennett's murder and assisted in the Fitzgerald bombing, fled Boston for the West Coast. After the trio made their way to Los Angeles, Salemme left to go into hiding on his own. While driving across the country with Poulos, Flemmi shot and killed his associate outside Las Vegas because he and Salemme "felt [Poulos] wouldn’t be able to stand up to pressure in court". Poulos' body was found in the Nevada desert in late 1969.

Flemmi spent four-and-a-half years as a fugitive, firstly in New York City and then in Montreal, where he worked as a printer at a newspaper. During his time on the run, Flemmi remained in contact with Rico, who kept him informed on the status of the cases against him. Rico also kept Flemmi's whereabouts confidential from Massachusetts authorities who were hunting him. After separating from Salemme because of a series of disagreements, Flemmi alerted the FBI to Salemme's location. As a result, Salemme was captured and sentenced to fifteen years in prison for the Fitzgerald bombing. The charges against Flemmi were ultimately dropped after key witnesses recanted their testimony, and Flemmi returned to Boston in May 1974.

=== Relationship with James J. Bulger and the FBI ===
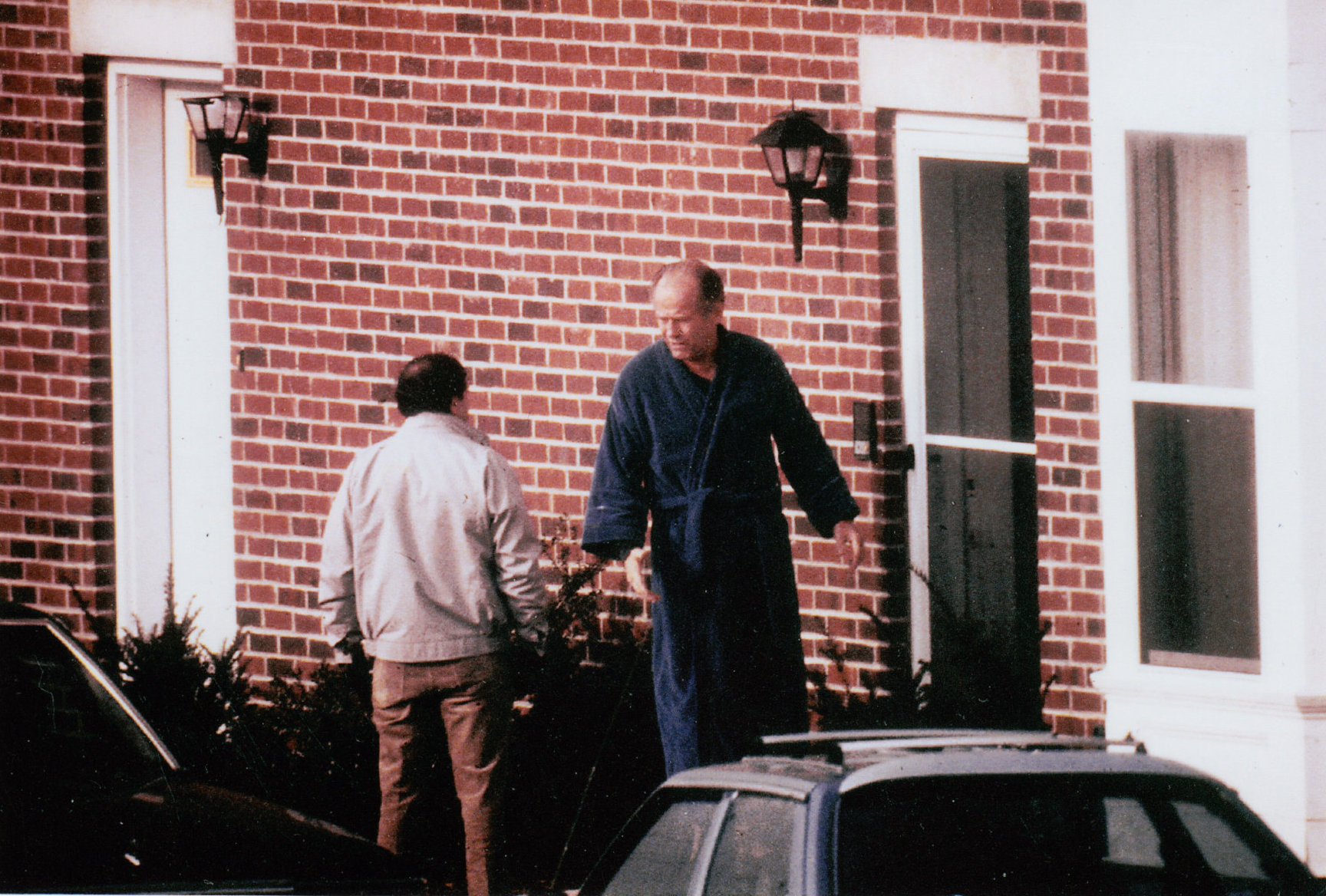
FBI surveillance photograph of Flemmi (left) with Winter Hill Gang boss, James Bulger (right), in 1980

In 1965, James J. "Whitey" Bulger was released from Federal prison after serving a nine-year sentence for robbing banks. After a few years of working as a janitor, he became an enforcer for South Boston mob boss Donald "Donnie" Killeen. After Killeen was murdered by an enforcer for the Mullen Gang, Winter Hill Gang boss Howard "Howie" Winter mediated the dispute between Bulger and the remaining Killeens and the Mullens, who were led by Patrick "Pat" Nee. Winter soon chose Bulger as his man in South Boston. At this time, the Boston FBI office tried to convince Bulger to become an informant, but he initially refused. In 1974, Bulger became partners with Flemmi as enforcers for the Winter Hill Gang. When Flemmi was later asked why he developed a close relationship with Bulger rather than other senior members of the gang, such as Winter or John Martorano, he replied: "We weren't involved in the lifestyle of the other guys. We didn't smoke or drink. They were party guys".

Bulger joined Flemmi in the Top Echelon informant program in 1975 when he was recruited by the FBI agent John "Zip" Connolly. Bulger allegedly told Flemmi that he knew his secret. Flemmi has insisted that he did not know at the time that Bulger was also an informant. The mobster Kevin Weeks, however, insists that Flemmi's story is untrue. He considers it too much of a coincidence that Bulger became an informant a year after becoming Flemmi's partner. He has written of his belief that Flemmi had probably helped to build a Federal case against him. Weeks has said that Bulger was likely forced to choose between supplying information to the FBI or returning to prison.

Rico, Flemmi's initial handler, was transferred to the Miami office of the FBI in 1970 and retired in 1975. With assistance from Bulger, Connolly revived Flemmi's relationship with the FBI. Connolly served as the handler of Flemmi and Bulger from 1975 until his retirement in 1990. United by a shared antipathy for the Patriarca family, a desire to profit from its destruction, and the protection of the FBI, Flemmi and Bulger forged a formidable and enduring partnership. As the alliance between the gangsters and the FBI developed, Flemmi and Bulger dined periodically with FBI agents investigating the Mafia, including Connolly and several of his colleagues on the Boston Organized Crime squad, Connolly's supervisors, John Morris and James Ring, and Joseph D. Pistone, who had gone undercover to infiltrate the Bonanno crime family in New York as "Donnie Brasco". Flemmi and Bulger bribed law enforcement officers in exchange for the identities of other informants. At the peak of their criminal activities, Flemmi and Bulger had between five and seven Boston FBI agents, between 25 and 30 Boston police officers and at least one Massachusetts State Police trooper, Richard Schneiderhan, on their payroll.

In 1997, shortly after The Boston Globe disclosed that Bulger and Flemmi had been informants, former Bulger confidant Kevin Weeks met with Connolly, who showed him a photocopy of Bulger's FBI informant file. In order to explain Bulger and Flemmi's status as informants, Connolly said, "The Mafia was going against Jimmy and Stevie, so Jimmy and Stevie went against them." According to Weeks,

As I read over the files at the Top of the Hub that night, Connolly kept telling me that 90 percent of the information in the files came from Stevie. Certainly Jimmy hadn't been around the Mafia the way Stevie had. But, Connolly told me, he had to put Jimmy's name on the files to keep his file active. As long as Jimmy was an active informant, Connolly said, he could justify meeting with Jimmy and giving him valuable information. Even after he retired, Connolly still had friends in the FBI, and he and Jimmy kept meeting to let each other know what was going on. I listened to all that, but now I understood that even though he was retired, Connolly was still getting information, as well as money, from Jimmy. As I continued to read, I could see that a lot of the reports were not just against the Italians. There were more and more names of Polish and Irish guys, of people we had done business with, of friends of mine. Whenever I came across the name of someone I knew, I would read exactly what it said about that person. I would see, over and over again, that some of these people had been arrested for crimes that were mentioned in these reports. It didn't take long for me to realize that it had been bullshit when Connolly told me that the files hadn't been disseminated, that they had been for his own personal use. He had been an employee of the FBI. He hadn't worked for himself. If there was some investigation going on and his supervisor said, 'Let me take a look at that,' what was Connolly going to do? He had to give it up. And he obviously had. I thought about what Jimmy had always said, 'You can lie to your wife and to your girlfriends, but not to your friends. Not to anyone we're in business with.' Maybe Jimmy and Stevie hadn't lied to me. But they sure hadn't been telling me everything.

Flemmi and Bulger assisted the FBI in planting a covert listening device in the headquarters of Patriarca family underboss Gennaro "Jerry" Angiulo at 98 Prince Street in the North End. At Morris' request, the duo visited the location in November 1980 and Flemmi subsequently produced a drawn diagram of Angiulo's office, which let FBI agents know exactly where to place bugs. Although Flemmi was concerned that information gathered on the wiretap may implicate him and Bulger in criminal activity, the FBI assured him that nothing on the tapes would be used against them.

=== Married life ===
In the 1950s, Flemmi was married to Jeanette McLaughlin, an Irish-American woman with whom he had two daughters. Although Flemmi left McLaughlin, they remained married until their divorce in 1980. After becoming estranged from his wife, Flemmi was involved in a decades-long relationship with Marion Hussey. Flemmi and Hussey lived together in Dorchester and Milton, and had three children, two sons and a daughter. Flemmi was also the stepfather of Deborah Hussey, Marion Hussey's daughter from a previous relationship. Throughout his life, Flemmi was engaged in clandestine affairs with several other women, including Shirley Rogers, Marilyn DiSilva, sisters Debra and Michelle Davis, and his stepdaughter Deborah Hussey. According to Salemme: "There's two things with Flemmi paramount to everything—his money and his women, not necessarily in that order".

Even while in relationships, Flemmi engaged in frequent liaisons with college girls at cocaine-fuelled parties hosted by John Martorano, although he himself was not a drug user. Flemmi and Bulger are also alleged to have committed statutory rape against numerous underage girls, some as young as 13, during the 1970s and 1980s, deliberately getting them hooked on heroin and then sexually exploiting them for years.

Flemmi first met Debra Davis in 1972 when he was 38 years old and she was 17 and working in a jewelry store in suburban Brookline. The couple dated for more than seven years. They lived together at an apartment in Randolph, along with Davis' younger sister, Michelle. Flemmi and Davis' relationship became strained after Flemmi began sexually abusing 14-year-old Michelle Davis. Afterwards, Debbie Davis decided to leave Flemmi for a Mexican businessman she had met on vacation in Acapulco. During an argument at the Bay Tower Room restaurant at 60 State Street, Flemmi, in frustration, tacitly admitted to Davis that he and Bulger were FBI informants. An enraged Bulger then allegedly insisted that Davis be killed, to which Flemmi acquiesced. On September 17, 1981, 26-year-old Davis was strangled to death in the basement of Flemmi's mother's home in South Boston. Flemmi claimed that Davis was murdered by Bulger. According to Martorano, Flemmi admitted that he had "accidentally" strangled her himself. Flemmi pulled out Davis' teeth and cut off her hands to complicate identifying the body, and she was buried at Tenean Beach on the Neponset River in North Quincy. As he and Bulger buried the body, Flemmi claimed to have considered killing Bulger for the murder. Flemmi misled Davis' family into thinking her daughter had moved to Texas. Under the guise of investigating Davis' disappearance, the FBI interviewed her mother Olga several times in the months following her death in an attempt to discover what the Davis family knew of Flemmi's activities. The FBI never questioned Flemmi about Davis' disappearance, however. Wracked with shame and guilt over the abuse she had suffered at the hands of Flemmi, Michelle Davis fell into drug addiction and alcoholism, and died from a drug overdose in January 2006.

Four years after killing Davis, in 1985, Flemmi and Bulger killed Deborah Hussey, who was also Flemmi's stepdaughter (born to his common-law wife, Marion A. Hussey). Deborah was first sexually molested by Flemmi in her teens—she informed her mother that Flemmi had molested her for years—and had been his girlfriend since. Hussey later developed a drug addiction and turned to prostitution. In the days prior to her murder, Hussey was close to breaking up with Flemmi and telling her mother about their relationship, which is thought to have been the motive for her murder.

It is thought that Flemmi, Bulger, and Weeks lured her to the house at 799 East Third Street in South Boston and garrotted her. Her body was then buried in the basement. According to Kevin Weeks,

Stevie said he'd take care of the clothes and teeth. He was all business, going about the task of cleaning up and pulling teeth. Even though he had a long-term relationship with Debbie, this wasn't bothering him any more than it had bothered Jimmy. Stevie was actually enjoying it, the way he always enjoyed a good murder. Like a stockbroker going to work, he was just doing his job. Cold and relaxed, with no emotion or change in his demeanor, he was performing a night's work. Whether he then went out to meet another of his girlfriends or went home to Marion, I have no idea. Later on, when I was alone with Jimmy, I asked him what that was all about. "Who knows?" he answered. "She was bringing blacks back to the house. She was doing drugs. Stevie was probably fucking her." I never asked again, but it was just kind of distasteful killing a woman. I can see killing guys. That's the life they chose, the life they're involved with, the life we all chose. But a woman was different. It wasn't a nice thing. Years later, it came out that Stevie was in fact having sex with Debbie. And she'd been his stepdaughter since she was three years old. Who knows if she knew anything else about him? But to kill a woman because she threatened to tell that you were fucking her didn't make any sense, no more than it did to kill a girlfriend because she wanted to leave you. According to Stevie's testimony in a later trial, when it came out that he had been having sex with her daughter, Marion still continued to see him. She didn't know about the murder, but she knew about the sex. That didn't make any sense, either.

=== Relationship with Frank Salemme ===
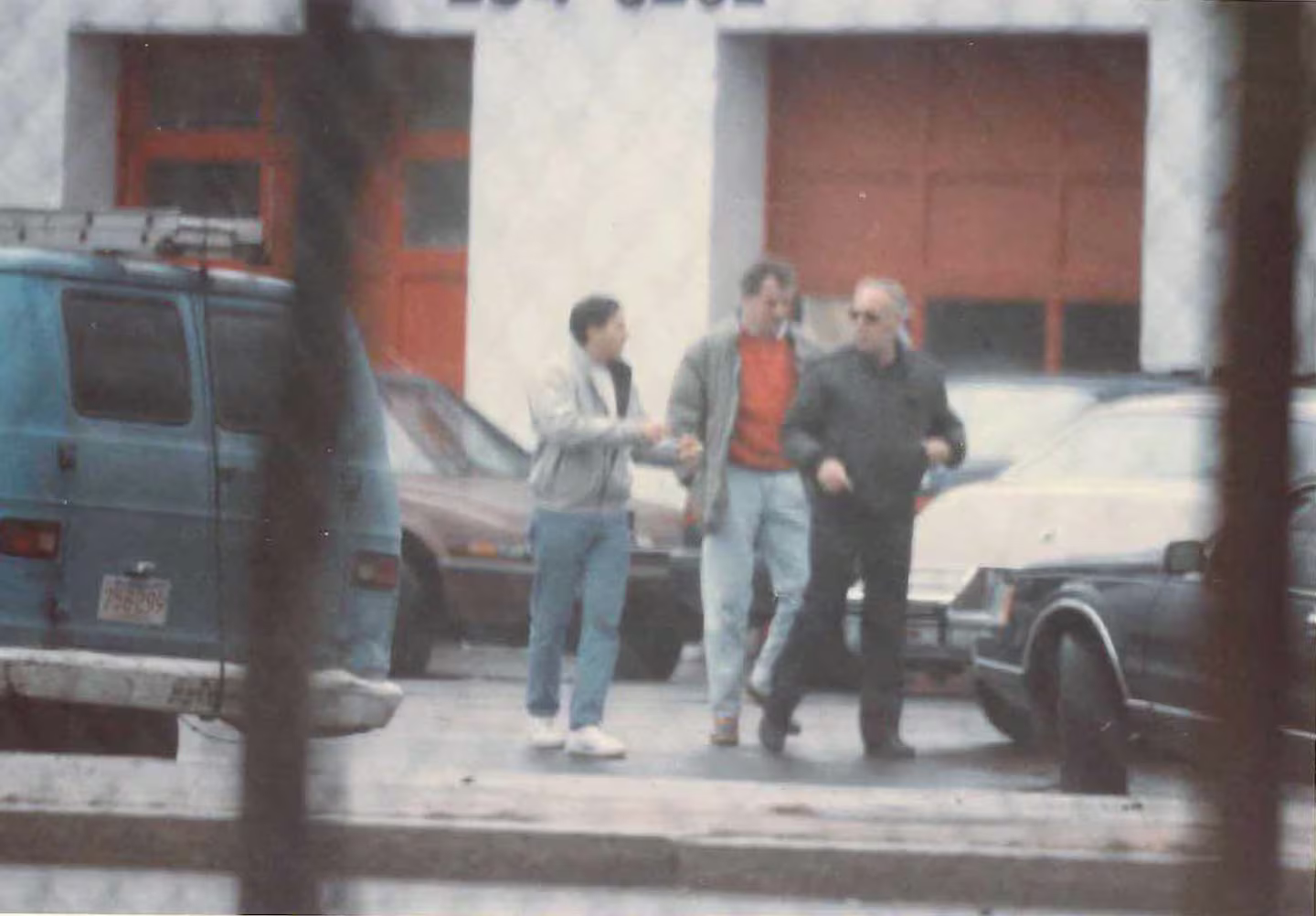
FBI surveillance photograph of Flemmi (left), Patriarca family mobster Frank Salemme, and Winter Hill Gang member George Kaufman, in 1989

Flemmi's longtime partner Salemme was released from state prison in 1988 after serving fifteen years for the attempted murder of Fitzgerald, and was subsequently inducted as a "made" member of the Patriarca family. To the disillusionment of Bulger, Flemmi drifted closer to Salemme and the Patriarca family as Salemme attempted to recruit him into the Mafia. Using his contacts with Connolly, Bulger plotted to have Salemme eliminated by his own crime family. Connolly had a story planted in a newspaper falsely stating that Salemme was planning to eradicate the East Boston faction of the Patriarca family. On June 16, 1989, Salemme survived a murder attempt when he was shot by East Boston mobsters outside a pancake house in Saugus.

By 1991, Salemme was the de facto leader of the Mafia in New England. To assure his position as the head of the Patriarca family, Salemme built an alliance between the Mafia and the Winter Hill Gang, effectively uniting Boston's Italian and Irish crime groups. Flemmi and an associate, George Kaufman, served as the liaisons between the Winter Hill Gang and the Patriarca family. Nonetheless, Bulger and Connolly's plan to sow discontent in the Patriarca family to prevent the Mafia from usurping the Winter Hill Gang as Boston's preeminent organized crime force succeeded as the Patriarca family descended into a state of internal warfare following the shooting of Salemme.

After Salemme took over the Channel nightclub in the Fort Point neighborhood of South Boston, Flemmi and Bulger were given a minority ownership stake in the nightclub in exchange for helping Salemme and the club's straw owner, Steven DiSarro, receive the required licensing and permitting from the local municipality. According to Flemmi, he witnessed the murder of DiSarro when he happened to visit Salemme's home in Sharon on May 10, 1993, walking in on Salemme's son, Francis "Frankie Boy" Salemme Jr., strangling DiSarro as an associate, Paul Weadick, held his legs and Salemme Sr. looked on. Flemmi's son, William "Billy" Hussey St. Croix, however, stated in a debriefing that Flemmi had told him that his presence at Salemme's home that day was not a mere coincidence and that Flemmi was in fact involved in DiSarro's murder. Salemme had ordered DiSarro's murder over fears he may cooperate with a federal investigation into fraud and money laundering at the Channel, in which Salemme's son also held a financial interest. DiSarro was buried behind a mill in Providence, Rhode Island.

In April 1994, a joint task force of the Drug Enforcement Administration (DEA), the Massachusetts State Police, and the Boston Police Department launched an investigation into gambling operations in which the Winter Hill Gang and the Patriarca family collaborated.

== Arrest and imprisonment ==
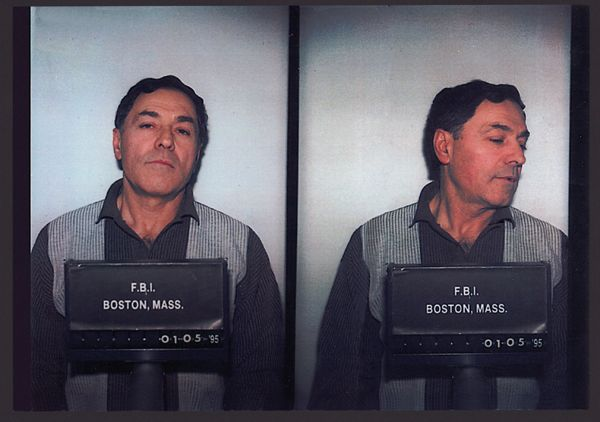
Flemmi's January 5, 1995 FBI mugshot

By the end of 1994, the Massachusetts State Police and the U.S. Attorney's Office had amassed enough evidence to indict Flemmi, Bulger and Salemme on 35 counts of racketeering and extortion. In December 1994, Connolly informed Bulger and Flemmi that several imprisoned Jewish-American bookmakers had agreed to testify to paying them protection money. As a result, sealed indictments had come from the Department of Justice, and the FBI was due to make arrests during the Christmas season. In response, Bulger fled Boston on December 23, 1994, accompanied by his common law wife, Catherine Greig. Flemmi in turn warned Salemme, who took flight to Providence and then West Palm Beach, Florida.

According to Kevin Weeks,

In 1993 and 1994, before the hounds of tuna came down, Jimmy and Stevie were traveling on the French and Italian Riviera. The two of them traveled all over Europe, sometimes separating for a while. Sometimes they took girls, sometimes just the two of them went. They would rent cars and travel all through Europe. It was more preparation than anything, getting ready for another life. They didn't ask me to go, not that I would have wanted to. Jimmy had prepared for the run for years. He'd established a whole other person, Thomas Baxter, with a complete ID and credit cards in that name. He'd even joined associations in Baxter's name, building an entire portfolio for the guy. He'd always said you had to be ready to take off on short notice. And he was.

Flemmi, however, miscalculated how soon the arrests would take place and remained in Boston. On January 5, 1995, he was arrested by the state police as he left Schooner's Restaurant in a car along with a woman companion. A bewildered Flemmi asked agents "Is this a gag?" as he was being arrested. He was held without bail and incarcerated at the Plymouth County House of Correction. Prosecutors gained sufficient evidence to bring murder charges against Flemmi after Hugh Shields became a government witness in 1995. On May 21, 1996, four charges of murder—those of Edward, Walter and William Bennett, and Richard Grasso—were added to a superseding indictment against Flemmi and Salemme.

During the discovery phase, two of Flemmi's co-defendants, Boston mafiosi Frank Salemme and Bobby DeLuca, were listening to tape from a roving wiretap, which is normally authorized when the FBI has no advance knowledge of where criminal activity will take place. They overheard two of the agents who were listening in on the wiretap mention that they should have told one of their informants to give "a list of questions" to the other wiseguys. When their lawyer, Tony Cardinale, learned about this, he realized that the FBI had lied about the basis for a roving wiretap in order to protect an informant. Suspecting that this was not the only occasion that this happened, Cardinale sought to force prosecutors to reveal the identities of any informants used in connection with the case.

Eventually, both Bulger and Flemmi were revealed to be FBI informants. Flemmi believed that as a result, he had protection from the FBI, but not immunity. He initially planned to prove through his own testimony and that of others that he was being prosecuted for crimes that were effectively authorized by the FBI. He believed that as a result, Judge Mark L. Wolf would have no choice but to throw out the entire indictment. Flemmi's problem was that, without immunity, he could not admit to killings he had not been charged with. By the time Flemmi took the stand, in August 1998, John Martorano had pleaded guilty and started outlining the details of almost twenty murders he'd committed. Many of his murders had been done at the direction of Bulger and Flemmi, who had paid him more than $1 million during his years as a wanted fugitive between 1978 and 1995. To many questions about the murders Flemmi was involved in, he pleaded the Fifth Amendment.

However, by 2000, it was obvious this gambit had failed. Out of desperation, he ordered Weeks to get in touch with retired state police lieutenant Richard J. Schneiderhan, a lifelong friend who had been on Winter Hill's payroll for virtually his entire career, to leak information about several wiretaps investigators were monitoring in hopes of tracking down Bulger. However, when Weeks reached a plea bargain a year later, he admitted Schneiderhan's role in the leak. Schneiderhan was ultimately convicted of obstructing justice and was sentenced to 18 months in prison. In 2000, Flemmi's brother Michael, then a retired Boston Police Department officer, was arrested for moving an arsenal of more than 70 weapons from their mother's shed after learning that it was to be the target of a search warrant. He was convicted in 2002 and sentenced to 10 years in prison. A year later, he pleaded guilty to selling a load of Flemmi's stolen jewelry for $40,000.

By 2003, Flemmi realized he was out of options. Salemme and several others had joined Weeks in turning informer, and had disclosed enough information to ensure Flemmi would die in prison. He also faced possible execution for murders in Florida and Oklahoma. In October, Flemmi pleaded guilty in U.S. District Court in Boston to 10 counts of murder and accepted a sentence of life in prison without parole. As a part of a deal, the sentence given to his brother, Michael, was reduced.

Flemmi testified against Connolly at the latter's trial for the murder of John Callahan, the former president of World Jai Alai. Callahan had been killed in 1981 after he was implicated in the murder of his successor as president, Roger Wheeler. According to Flemmi, Connolly told him and Bulger that Callahan could potentially turn state's evidence and implicate them in Wheeler's murder. He also testified against Bulger in the latter's 2013 trial for murder and racketeering, at which Bulger was sentenced to life plus five years.

As a cooperating witness, Flemmi is held in an undisclosed penitentiary as part of the Federal Bureau of Prisons' Witness Security (WitSec) program. On August 18, 2021, Flemmi was denied parole by the Florida Commission on Offender Review after seeking compassionate release. The commission noted that Flemmi had a total of 2,680 months left to serve and set his parole date for May 4, 2218. His next review was also pushed back seven years, to 2028, when he would be 93 years old.

== Victims ==
=== Murdered ===
- Arthur "Bucky" Barrett
- Edward Bennett
- Walter Bennett
- William Bennett
- Richard Castucci
- Edward G. Connors
- Debra Davis
- Richard Gasso
- Stephen Hughes Jr.
- Deborah Hussey
- Tommy King
- John McIntyre
- Edward McLaughlin
- James Sousa
- Roger Wheeler

== Depictions in popular culture ==
In the Whitey Bulger biopic Black Mass (2015), Flemmi is portrayed by Rory Cochrane.

== See also ==
- Timothy A. Connolly 3rd
