= Maurice Lerner =

Professional baseball player and mob hitman (1935–2013)

Maurice Richard "Pro" Lerner (December 20, 1935 – September 5, 2013) was a Mafia hit man connected with the Patriarca crime family who was convicted of murder in 1970. His conviction was overturned due to unethical behavior by the Federal Bureau of Investigation and its chief witness.

== Early life ==
Lerner was born in Cambridge, Massachusetts on December 20, 1935, to Samuel and Doris Lerner. His father was a small-time bookie. He played baseball for his high school in Brookline, Massachusetts batting .364 in his senior year. After he graduated, Lerner served two years in the US Marines, before signing on with the Erie Senators, and played minor league baseball through 1963.

Lerner compiled a career batting average of .308 with 24 home runs and 225 RBI in his 482-game career with the Erie Senators, Boise Braves, Yakima Bears, Topeka Hawks, Wilson Tobs, Jacksonville Braves, Atlanta Crackers, Savannah Pirates, Charlotte Hornets, Macon Peaches, Raleigh Capitals and York White Roses.

Lerner also played for the Winter League in Nicaragua during the 59–60 season

Johnny Pesky told reporters:

"[Lerner] must have hit .800 against us in the playoffs. We only got him out three times and twice on line drives. He's a tall, rangy boy with great determination. He hit about .360 in the regular season. They tried playing Lerner at third and at second and finally shifted him to the outfield. If I had him, I might use him in right field because he can run and has a real good arm. "In some ways he reminds you of George Kell. He's that kind of a hitter. He wears glasses, and while he doesn't look like Dom DiMaggio, he can cover more ground and can run faster. He stole six bases in the play-offs. He stole second and third against us on consecutive pitches."

== Criminal activities ==
Lerner became acquainted with mobster John "Red" Kelley in late 1962. The two men were seen frequently together. On June 9, 1965, Lerner was arrested on an outstanding fugitive from justice charge while sitting in Kelley's car. The warrant had been issued in December 1962 in Knox County, Tennessee charging Lerner with three counts of forging and uttering checks amounting to $140.

== Patriarca Family murder trial ==
Lerner, Patriarca family boss Raymond Patriarca and three other members of the family, Robert Fairbrothers, John Rossi, and Rudolph Sciarra, were tried in 1970 for murder and conspiracy to commit murder. Irish mobster John "Red" Kelley, a sometime associate of the family, gave testimony as a cooperating witness linking Lerner, Patriarca and other family members to the 1968 murder of Rudolph "Rudy" Marfeo and Anthony Melei. Kelley testified he had been contracted by Lerner to help plan the hit on Marfeo and Melei, whom Lerner allegedly murdered with a shotgun. After the trial, Kelley went into the federal witness protection program.

Lerner and Patriarca were convicted of conspiracy to commit murder and were sentenced to 10 years in prison. Lerner also was convicted of two counts of murder for which he was sentenced to two life terms in addition to the ten years for conspiracy, all of the sentences to be served consecutively. The jury was unable to reach a verdict for the other defendants.

Lerner's conviction subsequently was overturned by the Rhode Island Supreme Court in 1988. It had been established that Kelley had perjured himself at the trial, as had F.B.I. Special Agent H. Paul Rico, who had corroborated Kelley's testimony. The Court ruled, in the case Lerner v. Moran 542 A.2d 1089 (1988):

...that Kelley's perjury, elicited by the FBI, constituted material exculpatory evidence withheld in violation of the applicant's due-process rights. We also hold that the trial justice correctly denied the applicant's motion to dismiss his indictment.

The court vacated his conviction and ordered a new trial. He pleaded no contest and was released due to time served.

== Personal life ==
Lerner and his wife, Arrene, had a son and a daughter. He died in 2013.
