= Anthony Ciulla =

American criminal

- Ciulla's mugshot
- Born: c. 1943
- Died: June 6, 2003 (aged 60); Revere, Massachusetts, U.S.
- Other names: Tony Capra, Fat Tony
- Citizenship: American
- Years active: 1971-1975
- Organization: Winter Hill Gang
- Known for: Fixed horse races
- Status: Convicted
- Criminal charges: Fixing thoroughbred races
- Penalty: 4 to 6 years imprisonment
- Accomplices: Mark Gerard, Con Errico, Jorge Velásquez
- Comments: His testimony led to the conviction of 40 people. He was later put in the Federal Witness Protection Program

Details
- Victims: Michael Hole

Anthony Ciulla, later Tony Capra (c. 1943 – June 6, 2003) was an American criminal, convicted of bribing jockeys and fixing horse races. He was connected to the Boston-based Winter Hill Gang and later testified against several members of the organization.

== Biography ==
Anthony Ciulla was the son of a fishmonger. Ciulla began his career horse doping in races at county fairs. He later decided that bribing jockeys was the best way to fix races, since post race drug testing made it difficult to get away with doping.

Ciulla was able to influence jockeys through a combination of cash bribes, some as high as $10,000, and physical intimidation. When bribes failed, he used a combination of physical intimidation and his connections to the Boston-based Winter Hill Gang. The Winter Hill Gang became involved with Ciulla despite warnings from Jerry Angiulo that he could not be trusted.

He soon expanded his operations throughout the Eastern and Midwestern United States, although he was primarily active in the New York area. Ciulla often bribed jockeys who rode the betting favorite, and instructed them not to win the race. Ciulla then bet money on the long shots, with a chance of bigger payouts.

=== Arrest, conviction and witness protection ===
In 1975, Ciulla's activities came to light when a jockey he bribed, Peter Fantini, made an obvious display of restraining his horse during a race and became the subject of an investigation. Under police questioning, Fantini revealed Ciulla's activities. Ciulla was also implicated by jockey Michael Hole who reported that Ciulla approached him and tried to bribe him to pull a horse during a race at the Saratoga Race Course in 1974. Hole would later die under mysterious circumstances in 1976, which was later ruled a suicide.

Ciulla was convicted of fixing thoroughbred races in Massachusetts and Rhode Island, and was sentenced to four to six years in prison. Ciulla agreed to cooperate with the United States Department of Justice in exchange for immunity, relocation and a new identity.

In November 1978, Ciulla became a major witness in the federal government's investigation into horse racing. He then entered United States Federal Witness Protection Program under the new name Tony Capra. While on trial, Ciulla admitted to a number of crimes, including racing under assumed names, tax evasion and bribing jockeys with cocaine. His testimony proved key to the conviction of several jockeys and trainers, ending their careers. Ciulla implicated mob boss Whitey Bulger and his partner Stephen Flemmi in the horse fixing ring, but the two had recently become informants for the Federal Bureau of Investigation and were not prosecuted.

=== Later life and death ===
Ciulla lived in Malibu, California for a time under the identity of Tony Capra. In an interview with Sports Illustrated, he implicated well-known jockeys in the race fixing, including Angel Cordero, Jorge Velásquez and Jacinto Vásquez. Ciulla claimed to have fixed hundreds of races over the course of his career. Ciulla hoped to have a book and movie deal about his biography after the trial, but no projects ever materialized.

In 1992, Ciulla was arrested at his home in Newport Beach, California and was reportedly awaiting extradition to Switzerland on charges related to an alleged investment scam.

Ciulla reportedly died of a heart attack on June 6, 2003, in Revere, Massachusetts.
