= The Dark Brotherhood =

The Dark Brotherhood may refer to:

- Sonic Chronicles: The Dark Brotherhood, a video game by Sega.
- "The Dark Brotherhood", a short story in H. P. Lovecraft's collection The Dark Brotherhood and Other Pieces
- Dark Brotherhood, a guild of assassins in The Elder Scrolls video game series
- Brotherhood Outcasts, a Brotherhood of Steel splinter group in Fallout 3

== See also ==
- Black Brotherhood
- Brotherhood of Darkness
