= Joe Salvati =

American wrongly convicted of murder

Joe Salvati, wrongfully convicted of a mob-related murder, was ultimately cleared by evidence found by Boston journalist Dan Rea. Sentenced to life in May 1968, he was released in 1997. As a result, the House Committee on Government Reform investigated whether or not the Government withheld evidence.

In 1965, Edward "Teddy" Deegan was murdered in an alley in Chelsea, Massachusetts. In 2007, Judge Nancy Gertner awarded $102 million to those whose convictions were overturned, stating FBI agents were trying to protect their informants, including "one of the true killers, Vincent "Jimmy the Bear" Flemmi, who was an FBI informant." Joe "The Animal" Barboza's testimony was crucial in convicting Mr. Salvati. At the time, it was the "single largest sum ever awarded from the federal government under the Federal Tort Claims Act."

== Edward Deegan murder ==
Within hours of Deegan's murder, J. Edgar Hoover had a memo from the Boston field office on his desk accurately identifying all the shooters, the actual shooters, as opposed to the four innocent men who would be convicted of the crime on the false testimony of Joseph Barboza in 1968. The memo never mentioned Salvati or his co-defendants.

Salvati, whose only previous arrest had been for breaking and entering in 1954, was working odd jobs and had borrowed $400 from a friendly local moneylender. One day, the moneylender's accounts were unexpectedly taken over by Barboza. Barboza wanted Salvati's debt paid immediately, but Salvati was unable to pay, and stole the baseball bat from one of Barboza's enforcers who had been sent to collect the $400. A few days later, Salvati was arrested for the murder of Teddy Deegan, a man who Salvati had never even heard of before. Salvati's lawyers believe Barboza, the first in Boston recruited for the FBI witness protection program, set him up "simply to settle old scores."

== Coverup and conspiracy ==
Radio talk host Howie Carr would later surmise, "For the FBI, it was more important to keep Vincent, and later Barboza, on the street as informants than it was to prevent the framing of innocent men. In fact, the railroading of the four men served two purposes for the FBI, it would enable Vincent and Joseph Barboza to escape conviction for a murder they had committed, and it would also remove several Patriarca crime family members or associates from the criminal world that the FBI had not been able to eliminate in a legal manner".

== See also ==
- List of wrongful convictions in the United States
