= Vincent Flemmi =

American mobster (1935–1979)

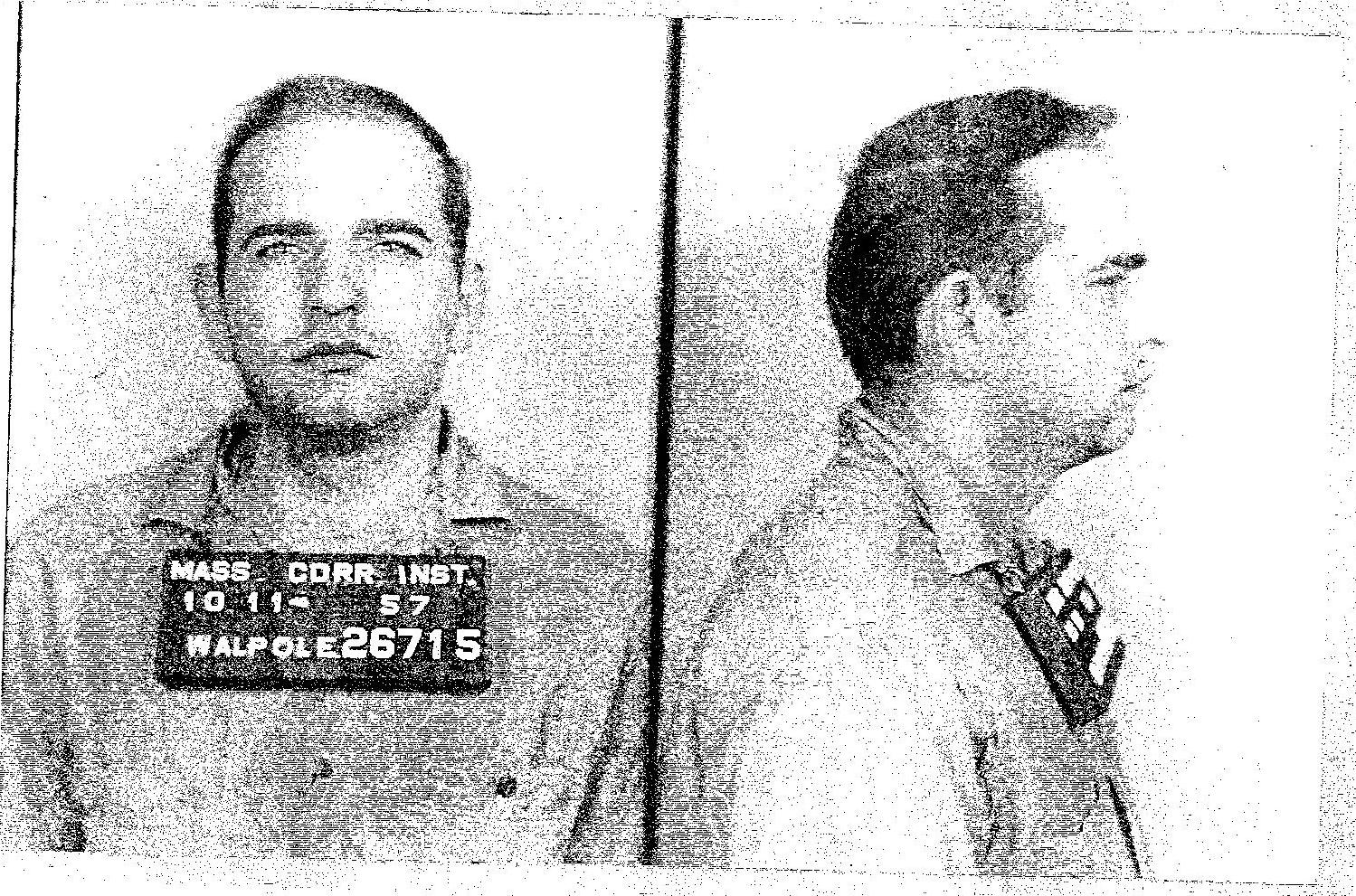
- Flemmi in 1957 at MCI Norfolk
- Born: Vincent James Flemmi; September 5, 1935; Boston, Massachusetts, U.S.
- Died: October 16, 1979 (aged 44); Norfolk, Massachusetts, U.S.
- Other name: Jimmy The Bear
- Occupation: Gangster
- Years active: 1960s–1979
- Relatives: Stephen Flemmi (brother); Michael Flemmi (brother)
- Allegiance: Winter Hill Gang; Patriarca crime family

Vincent James Flemmi (September 5, 1935 – October 16, 1979), also known as "Jimmy The Bear", was an American mobster who freelanced for the Winter Hill Gang and the Patriarca crime family. He was also a longtime informant for the Federal Bureau of Investigation. He was the brother of fellow mobster and government informant Stephen Flemmi.

== Early life ==
Vincent Flemmi was born in 1935, to Italian immigrant Giovanni Flemmi (1892–1991), and Mary Irene (née Misserville) Flemmi (1912–2000), who was of Irish descent. He was raised in the Orchard Park tenement located at 25 Ambrose Street in Roxbury, Massachusetts. His father Giovanni was a bricklayer who, according to fellow mobster Kevin Weeks, served in the Royal Italian Army during World War I. His mother was a full-time homemaker. He was the brother of Stephen Flemmi and Michael Flemmi.

== Criminal career ==
In the late 1950s, Flemmi and his brother Stephen joined the Roxbury Gang led by the brothers Walter, William and Edward "Wimpy" Bennett, who controlled bookmaking and drug dealing in the Roxbury and South End neighborhoods of Boston.

During the Boston gang wars of the 1960s, Vincent, along with Joseph Barboza became so feared, that the city's newspaper photographers often attached a note on the back of their arrest photos: "NO credit on photograph".

=== Relationship with FBI ===
Because Flemmi was so feared by his associates, Frank Salemme asked Raymond Patriarca to contact Flemmi and prohibit him from committing any more killings. Patriarca agreed with Salemme and, in a conversation intercepted by the FBI, stated: "If the killings don't stop, I'll declare martial law". Vincent's homicidal tendencies became so out of hand that Gennaro Angiulo held a sit down with Vincent inside an FBI-bugged room on Tremont Street. From now on, Angiulo told him— Patriarca would have to approve each of his hits, personally, just as he had done with Joseph Barboza. Patriarca remained fond of Flemmi, however, as he viewed him as a competent and useful hitman.

In March 1965, H. Paul Rico wanted to make Vincent a Top Echelon Informant for the FBI. On March 10, 1965, Rico filed a report quoting an informant as saying that Vincent was going to murder Edward "Teddy" Deegan and that a "dry run has already been made and that a close associate of Deegan's has agreed to set him up." Two days later, despite their knowledge of the impending murder of Deegan, the Boston FBI office approved Vincent as an informant and assigned him to Rico, the agent who had recruited him. The FBI recruited Flemmi as an informant despite him having murdered at least half a dozen people and reportedly holding the ambition of becoming the preeminent hitman in New England.

=== Edward Deegan murder ===
The evening of March 12, 1965, Edward Deegan was shot to death by Vincent Flemmi and Joseph Barboza, among others in an alleyway in Chelsea, Massachusetts. Within hours, J. Edgar Hoover had a memo from the Boston field office on his desk accurately identifying all the shooters, the actual shooters, as opposed to the four innocent men who would be convicted of the crime on the false testimony of Joseph Barboza in 1968.

=== Deegan murder coverup and conspiracy ===
Radio talk host Howie Carr would later surmise, "For the FBI, it was more important to keep Vincent, and later Barboza, on the street as informants than it was to prevent the framing of innocent men. In fact, the railroading of the four men served two purposes for the FBI, it would enable Vincent and Joseph Barboza to escape conviction for a murder they had committed, and it would also remove several Patriarca crime family members or associates from the criminal world that the FBI had not been able to eliminate in a legal manner". One of Deegan's friends told him about a bank burglary in Chelsea, and he'd meet up with several guys from Ebb Tide, a Mafia-run gin mill on Revere Beach. Vincent's shooting party would include mob associate, Joseph Barboza.

Teddy Deegan was a maternal nephew of Bonanno crime family capo Alphonse Indelicato and Anthony Indelicato.

=== Benjamin murder ===
On May 4, 1964, the police found the body of Francis Regis "Frank" Benjamin.

According to Kevin Weeks, a longtime associate of Flemmi's brother Stephen,

The murder of Francis Benjamin, for which the Bear had gotten the life sentence, was a particularly ugly one. After he'd shot Benjamin in the head, using a gun that belonged to a cop, the Bear had cut off the head to avoid any ballistics evidence tracing the gun to the crime. But they fingered him anyhow.

== Later life and death ==
Flemmi became a drug abuser during the 1960s. In 1975, while serving an eleven-to-eighteen-year sentence for assault with intent to commit murder, he'd received one of the state's first weekend furloughs from prison. Vincent immediately fled, and was not apprehended until three years later, in Baltimore, Maryland when he was arrested on charges of assaulting a woman. He was extradited to Massachusetts and returned to the prison at Walpole. On October 16, 1979, Vincent died of a drug overdose at the state prison in Norfolk, Massachusetts.

=== Legacy ===
According to South Boston mobster Kevin Weeks,

When Stevie's brother Jimmy the Bear died of a heroin overdose while serving a life sentence at MCI Norfolk for the murder of Francis Benjamin, Jimmy and I went to the wake. While we were viewing his brother lying in the casket, Stevie was standing there with his mother and father and Michael. Mary went over to Jimmy and said, crying, 'Vincent was such a good boy. He never hurt anyone.' Stevie looked at her and said, 'Stop, Ma. He killed everybody.'
