= The Channel (nightclub) =

Nightclub and music venue in Boston, MA

Coordinates: 42.3486265°N 71.0518556°W

The Channel was a music venue located in Boston, Massachusetts, that was part of the underground arts community of South Boston.

== History ==
Joe Cicerone, Harry Booras and Rich Clements founded The Channel in 1980, choosing the name because the club sat at the edge of the Fort Point Channel, which separates South Boston from the Financial District. The club was on the other side and a little south of where the Boston Tea Party took place (old Griffin's Wharf) in 1773. Cicerone's involvement in the club would be short lived and he would soon be replaced by Jack Burke. Burke and Harry Booras along with Peter Booras as General Manager would run The Channel throughout its heyday of the 1980s. The authorities had revoked the liquor license several times with fines for serving minors. In 1990, owners Harry and Peter Booras filed for chapter 11 bankruptcy protection, and at the end of 1991 sold their ownership stake in the club to a group that was headed by Steven A. DiSarro. Former New England Mob boss Frank Salemme and his son Francis P. Salemme Jr. had a financial interest in the club under this new ownership group, with Salemme Jr. listed for a time as the assistant manager of the club. Former owner Harry Booras denied any mob ties during his ownership of the club from 1980 through 1991, stating “We were approached a couple times, but we were never associated with mobsters.”. The Channel continued hosting shows through 1992, including shows in November by Alice in Chains and Stone Temple Pilots. In the spring of 1993, the venue was transformed into an adult entertainment club known as Soiree that featured semi-nude dancers. On May 10, 1993, shortly after the Soiree opened, DiSarro disappeared. Over 25 years later, on September 13, 2018, Frank Salemme and Paul Weadick were sentenced to life without the possibility of parole for DiSarro's murder. Salemme Jr. was also believed to be involved but was not tried due to his death in 1995.
