= Enrico Tameleo =

Enrico Tameleo

Enrico "Henry" Tameleo (July 12, 1901 – August 18, 1985), also known as "the Referee", was an American mobster from Boston, Massachusetts and underboss in the New England–based Patriarca crime family and was also a member of the New York–based Bonanno crime family of La Cosa Nostra from 1952 to 1968.

== Criminal career ==
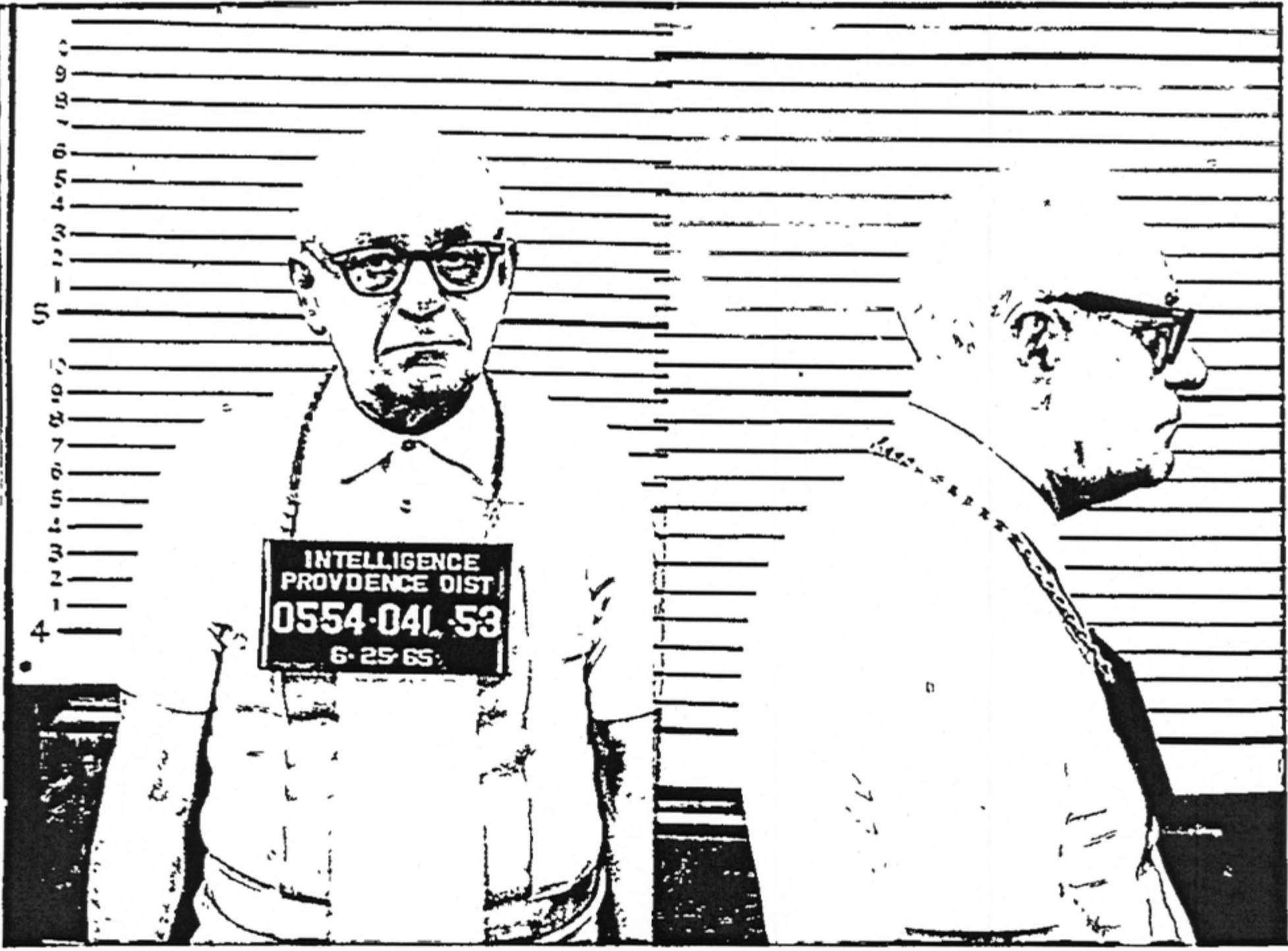
Tameleo's mugshot in 1967

Tameleo was a long time participant in organized crime and is considered one of the founding fathers of the Patriarca family. In 1967, Tameleo, Raymond L.S. Patriarca, and Jerry Angiulo were charged with the murder of bookmaker Willie Marfeo. Before the trial's conclusion, on March 12, 1965, Tameleo, Peter Limone, Louis Greco, Wilfred Roy French, Ronald Cassesso and Joe Salvati were indicted for the murder of hoodlum Edward "Teddy" Deegan. In 1968, all six men were found guilty of the Deegan murder in the Superior Court of Suffolk County, Massachusetts. Tameleo, Limone, Greco and Cassesso were sentenced to death by the state, with Salvati and French receiving life sentences. The death sentences were later reduced to life in prison, where Tameleo died on August 18, 1985.

== Wrongful conviction ==
By 2000, Tameleo and the other defendants had been posthumously exonerated amid evidence they had been ensnared in a government frame-up and cover-up extending over thirty years. In 2007, a federal judge in Boston awarded damages of $101.7 million to the families of the four men who were wrongly convicted in the 1965 Deegan murder. It was proven that Federal Bureau of Investigation (FBI) agents H. Paul Rico, Dennis Condon, John Morris, and John Connolly withheld evidence of the defendants' innocence in order to protect FBI informants Vincent "Jimmy the Bear" Flemmi and Joseph Barboza. Out of this settlement, $13 million went to the estate of Enrico Tameleo, specifically his son, Saverio, as administrator of the Tameleo estate, and Tameleo's wife Jeanette.

== See also ==
- Patriarca crime family
- Winter Hill Gang
