= Michael Flemmi =

American police officer

- Born: July 9, 1937 (age 89); Boston, Massachusetts, U.S.
- Occupation: Former Boston Police Department officer (1957–1990)
- Parent(s): Giovanni Flemmi; Mary Irene Misserville
- Relatives: Stephen Flemmi (brother); Vincent Flemmi (brother)
- Status: Released
- Convictions: Obstruction of justice (18 U.S.C. § 1503) (2 counts); Perjury (18 U.S.C. § 1621); Possession of unregistered machine guns, silencers, and cut-down shotguns (26 U.S.C. §§ 5861 and 5871); Transfer and possession of machine guns (18 U.S.C. § 922)
- Penalty: 10 years imprisonment

Michael S. Flemmi (born July 9, 1937) is an American retired Boston Police Department officer who was convicted of obstruction of justice charge stemming from his relationship with his brother Stephen Flemmi and the Winter Hill Gang.

== Early life ==
Flemmi was born in 1937, to Italian immigrant Giovanni Flemmi (1892–1991), and Mary Irene (née Misserville) Flemmi (1912–2000), both of Italian descent. He was the last of his brothers Stephen Flemmi and Vincent Flemmi. He was raised in the Orchard Park tenement located at 25 Ambrose Street in Roxbury, Massachusetts. His father Giovanni was a bricklayer who, according to fellow mobster Kevin Weeks, served in the Royal Italian Army during World War I.

== Legal Issues ==
In 2000, Flemmi was arrested for moving an arsenal of more than 70 weapons from their mother's shed after learning that it was to be the target of a search warrant. In September 2002 he was convicted and sentenced to 10 years in prison. A year later, he pleaded guilty to selling a load of Stephen's stolen jewelry for $40,000.

By 2003, his brother Stephen Flemmi knew he was at the end of his tether. In October, Flemmi pleaded guilty in U.S. District Court in Boston to 10 counts of murder and accepted a sentence of life in prison without parole. He made the decision as a part of a deal to reduce the sentence for his brother, Michael Flemmi.

U.S. District Judge Richard G. Stearns said it was difficult to sentence Flemmi, because he had done some good work during his 30 years as a Boston police officer.

While incarcerated, Flemmi's register number was 23391-038. He was released from prison on September 2, 2011.
