= Raymond L. S. Patriarca =

American mobster (1908–1984)

- Born: Raymond Loreda Salvatore Patriarca; March 17, 1908; Worcester, Massachusetts, U.S.
- Died: July 11, 1984 (aged 76); North Providence, Rhode Island, U.S.
- Resting place: Gate of Heaven Cemetery, East Providence, Rhode Island, U.S.
- Other names: Il Padrone; John N'Nubile
- Occupation: Crime boss
- Spouses: Helen Mandella (m. 1939; died 1965): Rita O'Toole
- Children: Raymond Patriarca Jr.
- Allegiance: Patriarca crime family
- Convictions: Robbery (1938); Conspiracy to murder (1970)
- Penalty: Five years' imprisonment; served four months 10 years' imprisonment

Raymond Loreda Salvatore Patriarca (/ˌpætriˈɑːrkə/; March 17, 1908 – July 11, 1984) was an American mobster and crime boss from Providence, Rhode Island, who became the long-time boss of the Patriarca crime family, whose control extended throughout New England for more than three decades. Patriarca died on July 11, 1984.

== Early life ==
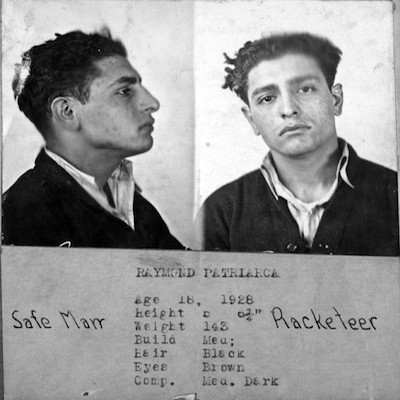
Raymond Patriarca's Providence Police photo

Patriarca was born on March 17, 1908, in Worcester, Massachusetts, to Eleuterio Patriarca, an Italian immigrant from the village of Arce, Lazio, and Vincenza (Mary Jane) DeNubila, an Italian American. At the age of four, Patriarca moved with his family to Providence, Rhode Island, and left school when he was eight to shine shoes and work as a bellhop.

During his teenage years, Patriarca was charged with hijacking, armed robbery, assault, safecracking, and auto theft. He was indicted as an accessory to murder before Prohibition's end in 1933. During the 1930s, the Providence Board of Public Safety named him "public enemy No. 1". He was sentenced to five years in prison for robbery, but he was paroled in 1938 after serving four months in prison.

An inquiry revealed that Executive Councilor Daniel H. Coakley, a close associate of Governor Charles F. Hurley, had drawn up a parole petition based on the appeals of a "Father Fagin", whom Coakley had fabricated. Coakley was impeached and dismissed from the Governor's office. This scandal enhanced Patriarca's reputation in the underworld, as it demonstrated the power of his political connections.

In 1939, Patriarca married Helen G. Mandella and had a son, Raymond Patriarca Jr.

== Rise to power ==
During the 1940s, Patriarca continued to rise in power. In 1950, mobster Philip Buccola fled the country to avoid prosecution for tax evasion, and Patriarca took control of his criminal operations.

In 1956, Patriarca made drastic changes in the crime family, the biggest being to move his base of operations to Providence, Rhode Island. He ran his crime family from the National Cigarette Service Company and Coin-O-Matic Distributors, a vending machine and pinball machine business on Atwells Avenue in the Federal Hill neighborhood of Providence. Every card game, prostitution ring, and illegal business in Providence had to pay a kickback to Patriarca.

In 1960, U.S. Attorney General Robert F. Kennedy ordered a crackdown against the Mafia. Federal Bureau of Investigation (FBI) director J. Edgar Hoover initially resisted Kennedy's orders to fight La Cosa Nostra, vehemently denying the existence of any national crime network, but he eventually relented when John F. Kennedy became President in 1961. Patriarca was pursued by the FBI with a particular zeal after he drew the ire of the Kennedy brothers by taunting them during congressional hearings by saying: "You two don't have the brains of your retarded sister". Robert Kennedy allegedly told a friend afterwards that he and John Kennedy would be "going after that pig on the Hill".

Patriarca's reign as leader of the New England syndicate was rumored to be brutal and ruthless. In one incident, he allegedly ordered an elderly mobster to murder his own son, after Patriarca lost a substantial amount of money on a bad deal. The father pleaded for his son's life, so Patriarca exiled him from the family. Patriarca's underboss Henry Tameleo also persuaded him to relent. In another incident, Patriarca demanded that several members of the crime family pay him $22,000 after federal authorities seized a hijacked shipment of cigarettes that he had financed. He allegedly ordered the murder of his brother for failing to notice an electronic surveillance device placed in his office by federal agents. He also allegedly ordered the murder of several members of the McLaughlin Gang during the Irish Mob wars between the Charlestown Mob and the Winter Hill Gang. This occurred when Bernie McLaughlin started interfering with Patriarca's loansharking operations in Boston.

== Imprisonment ==
Patriarca's Rhode Island State Police I.D. photo

In March 1970, Patriarca and several of his associates went on trial for murder and conspiracy to commit murder, the chief witness being robber and hitman John "Red" Kelley, who afterwards went into the federal witness protection program. Kelley gave testimony linking Patriarca and other family members to the murder of Rudolph "Rudy" Marfeo and Anthony Melei. Kelley had been contracted by Patriarca to kill Marfeo.

Patriarca and his associates were convicted of conspiracy to commit murder. Associate Maurice Lerner was also convicted of murder. The mob boss was sentenced to 10 years in prison, but he continued to run the crime family while imprisoned. He was paroled in 1975.

Lerner and the other defendants were subsequently exonerated when it was established that Kelley had perjured himself at the trial, as had FBI agent H. Paul Rico, who had corroborated Kelley's testimony.

Patriarca was arrested again in 1980 for allegedly having set up two murders. His lawyer was able to convince the judge that he would not survive a trial because of his heart disease.

== Death ==
Patriarca had suffered from heart disease and diabetes for many years. He died of a heart attack on July 11, 1984, at the age of 76. He is buried in Gate of Heaven Cemetery, East Providence, Rhode Island.

American Mafia
Preceded by Frank Morelli	Patriarca crime family Underboss; 1947–1954	Succeeded by Enrico Tameleo
Preceded by Phil Buccola	Patriarca crime family Boss; 1954–1984	Succeeded by Raymond Patriarca Jr.
