= Gennaro Angiulo =

American mobster (1919–2009)

- Angiulo's May 31, 1947, mugshot
- Born: Gennaro Joseph Angiulo; March 20, 1919; Boston, Massachusetts, U.S.
- Died: August 29, 2009 (aged 90); Boston, Massachusetts, U.S.
- Other name: "Jerry"
- Occupation: Crime boss
- Years active: 1963–1986
- Spouse: Barbara Lombard
- Children: 3
- Parent(s): Cesare Angiulo; Giovannina Femiani
- Status: Paroled/released in 2007
- Allegiance: Patriarca crime family
- Criminal charges: Racketeering, gambling, loan sharking, and obstruction of justice
- Penalty: Sentenced to 45 years in prison
- Military career
- Allegiance: United States
- Branch: United States Navy
- Service years: 1941–1945

Gennaro Joseph "Jerry" Angiulo Sr. (Italian pronunciation: [dʒenˈnaːro ˈandʒulo]; March 20, 1919 – August 29, 2009) was an American mobster who rose to the position of underboss in the Patriarca crime family of New England under Raymond L. S. Patriarca. He and his brothers oversaw the Boston, Massachusetts faction of the Patriarca family. Angiulo was convicted of racketeering in 1986 and was imprisoned until being released in 2007. According to Massachusetts State Police colonel Thomas J. Foley, Angiulo was "probably the last very significant Mafia boss in Boston’s history".

== Early life ==
Gennaro J. Angiulo was born in 1919 to Italian immigrants Cesare and Giovannina "Jeannie" (née Fimiani) Angiulo, who owned the "Dog House", a mom-and-pop convenience store and luncheonette on Prince Street in the North End of Boston. He grew up with his siblings Nicolo, Donato, Francesco, Antonio, Michele and James. Even though he was from the North End neighborhood, he graduated from Boston English High School in 1936, where his ambition was to attend Suffolk Law School and become a criminal lawyer. Instead, he enlisted in the U.S. Navy at the beginning of World War II and served four years in the Pacific theater, achieving the rank of Chief Boatswain's Mate. Upon completion of his service, he returned to the North End of Boston.

== Criminal career ==
Gennaro's brothers, who by now were all involved in Boston's criminal underworld, recruited him into their circle. Efforts by local authorities to arrest and prosecute operators of the "Italian lottery" created an opening for them; the Angiulo brothers found local businesses willing to serve as fronts for their bookies and gave them "discounts" on the bets in return, then reinvested their profits into legitimate enterprises such as nightclubs to launder them. The dominant Patriarca crime family co-opted the brothers, inducting them as members of the family and taking a cut of their action.

After the Kefauver hearings began in 1950, Joseph Lombardi, a senior member of the Mafia in Boston, ordered all bookmaking operations in the city to cease or to operate without a central layoff bank and without police protection, fearing the publicity from the hearings may expose his rackets. As a result, bookmakers lost the protection of the Mafia but gained freedom to operate independently. Angiulo obtained Lombardi's permission to enter the bookmaking rackets in 1951. The Mafia's overreaction to the Kefauver hearings, which ultimately had little effect on organized crime in Boston, allowed Angiulo to take control of the city's newly independent gambling operations.

By the late 1950s, Angiulo was being extorted by the mafioso Ilario "Larry Baione" Zannino. To end the shakedown, Angiulo paid $50,000 to Raymond "the Man" Patriarca, the boss of the Patriarca crime family in Providence, Rhode Island, in exchange for being inducted as a "made" member of the family, agreeing to pay an additional $100,000 per year. The payment allowed Angiulo to become a full-fledged member of the Mafia without having to commit a murder, which is typically required for prospective mafiosi. The relationship between Angiulo and Patriarca was strictly financial. Although Angiulo was not popular or well-respected in Providence, he retained the protection of Patriarca due to his high-earning status.

In around 1962, one mobster, Vincent "Fat Vinny" Teresa, drew the ire of Angiulo when he beat up an associate of Joseph Paterno, a New Jersey-based caporegime in the Gambino crime family. Paterno complained to Angiulo, who never liked Teresa and solicited to have him killed over the beating. Only the intervention of Patriarca saved Teresa's life. Teresa became a confidential informant for the Federal Bureau of Investigation (FBI) afterwards.

=== Underboss ===
The Angiulo brothers were first publicly named as members of the Mafia during the Valachi hearings in 1963. Gennaro's reputation for being a shrewd businessman, along with his successful racketeering, led to Patriarca appointing him underboss of the Patriarca family. From this perch, Angiulo headed up Boston's underworld from the 1960s to the 1980s. As family underboss, he oversaw all Mafia rackets between Boston and Worcester. Angiulo's closest capo was Zannino, who Angiulo relied on to provide "muscle" to the Boston faction of the family.

Gennaro and his brothers ran the criminal organization out of their headquarters, the "Dog House", located at 98 Prince Street in the North End, which was the location of the Angiulo family home and former premises of the luncheonette operated by their parents in the 1940s. Gennaro and his brothers were popular figures in the Italian enclave.

A period of gang warfare erupted in Boston beginning in September 1961 and involving the rival Irish mob groups, the McLaughlin Gang of Charlestown and Somerville's Winter Hill Gang. The feud resulted in over 50 murders. Many gangsters went into hiding to avoid the bloodshed, resulting in their illicit operations being neglected and Patriarca receiving less money from the Boston rackets. Patriarca threatened to "declare martial law" and ordered the leaders of both gangs to hold peace talks in January 1965, but the negotiations failed. Angiulo and Patriarca sought advice from the New York crime boss Vito Genovese, who advised them to cede some territory to appease the Irish gangs. Determined to end the war, Patriarca decided to back the Winter Hill Gang to eliminate the McLaughlin Gang. Angiulo claimed to have killed twenty Irish mobsters to quell the gang war, saying he and his brothers "buried 20 fucking Irishmen to take this fucking town over".

On August 8, 1967, Angiulo was indicted by the Suffolk County Grand Jury on charges of conspiracy to murder Rocco DiSiglio, a Mafia associate and former boxer who was shot five times and left in a sports car in Topsfield in June 1966. Angiulo allegedly incited three others—Richard DeVincent, Marino LePore, and Bernard "Bernie" Zinna, who were each charged with first-degree murder—to kill DiSiglio. The indictments were the result of the Grand Jury testimony of former hit man Joseph "the Animal" Barboza. Angiulo utilized two underlings, Stephen "the Rifleman" Flemmi and Francis "Cadillac Frank" Salemme, to ensure he was acquitted by jury tampering. In 1968, Anguilo and his co-defendants were found not guilty.

Angiulo recruited the Winter Hill Gang for assistance in a war against the Somerville-based Notarangeli crew, headed by Alfred "Indian Al" Notarangeli. Notarangeli's gang had begun extorting bookmakers who were under the protection of the Patriarca family, and while on furlough from prison in 1972, Notarangeli murdered one of Angiulo's bookies, Paulie Folino. Folino disappeared in September 1972 and his remains were discovered in a shallow grave in Boxford a month later.

In March and April 1973, the Winter Hill Gang carried out a series of hits, resulting in the deaths of mobsters Michael Milano, Al Plummer, William O'Brien, James Leary, and Joseph "Indian Joe" Notarangeli. After several failed attempts on his life, Al Notarangeli was shot in the head and left in the trunk of his car by the Winter Hill Gang on February 22, 1974, at the request of the Patriarca family.

Angiulo became a multimillionaire. He lived in a beachfront mansion in the suburb of Nahant and drove a Jeep with "Italian Stallion" inscribed on the license plate.

== Capture ==
=== Arrest ===
In 1981, the Federal Bureau of Investigation (FBI) placed wiretaps in the headquarters and at a nearby social club, located at 51 North Margin Street, for three months. It was later revealed in a federal court that rival gangsters Whitey Bulger and Stephen Flemmi (the latter of whom was a longtime friend of the Angiulo brothers) drew a diagram for FBI agents telling them where to plant the bugs. During one taped conversation between Angiulo and Zannino, Angiulo said: "I wouldn't be in legitimate business for all the fucking money in the world. We're shylock. We're a fucking bookmaker. We're selling marijuana. We're illegal here, illegal there. Arsonists! We're every fucking thing".

On September 19, 1983, following a three-year federal investigation, Angiulo was arrested alongside his brothers Francesco and Michele at Francesco's Restaurant in the North End. Donato Angiulo was arrested nearby. As Angiulo was being taken in handcuffs from the restaurant, he yelled, "I'll be back before my pork chops get cold." The four, along with a fifth Angiulo brother, Vittore, as well as Ilario Zannino and Samuel Granito were indicted on racketeering charges involving murder, loan sharking, obstruction of justice, obstruction of law enforcement, interstate travel involving racketeering and illegal gambling. The indictment listed six murders, including that of Joseph Barboza. Angiulo and his associates allegedly made $250,000 per week from the rackets.

After the death of Patriarca in July 1984, Angiulo sought the leadership of the family. His closest lieutenant, Zannino, instead lent his support to Patriarca's son, Raymond Patriarca Jr., however, who promoted Zannino to consigliere after he was appointed the successor to his father. Following Angiulo's arrest, and amid newspaper reports that revealed his carelessness in allowing the FBI to infiltrate the Boston mob, the Patriarca family formally demoted him to the rank of soldier as a symbolic rebuke. Francesco "Paul" Intiso succeeded Angiulo as underboss.

=== Trial ===
At the highly publicized trial, which lasted eight months, jurors heard hours of taped conversations of Angiulo and his associates discussing and planning numerous illegal activities, including murder, gambling, loan sharking and extortion. In one conversation, Angiulo ordered the murder of a bartender employed in one of his clubs after learning that he had agreed to testify to having overheard incriminating details of Angiulo crimes. The FBI thwarted the plot by warning the witness.

While sitting in court, the mobster often sarcastically commented on the evidence presented and cracked jokes, prompting District Court Judge David Nelson to repeatedly reprimand him for contemptible behavior.

== Sentence and later life ==
On February 27, 1986, Angiulo and his co-defendants were convicted of "an avalanche of charges". On April 3, 1986, he was sentenced to 45 years in prison on 12 counts of racketeering, gambling, loan sharking, and obstruction of justice. As his own lawyer, Angiulo argued numerous times, unsuccessfully, to have his conviction overturned. One argument claimed that he was framed by the FBI, Bulger, and Flemmi.

In an affidavit filed in federal court in 2004, he wrote that he was in poor health and his term was "tantamount to an illegal death sentence". Angiulo, who had been incarcerated at the federal prison hospital in Devens, was paroled on September 10, 2007. He had been undergoing dialysis treatment since his release while living at his waterfront home in Nahant. Prior to his death, he was spending time with his wife, Barbara, with whom he had three children.

== Death ==
Angiulo died on August 29, 2009, at the Massachusetts General Hospital of kidney failure from kidney disease. A funeral mass was said in Angiulo's honor at St. Leonard's Church in Boston's North End on May 8, 2009. He received a military burial at an undisclosed cemetery following his death.

== In popular culture ==
In the Whitey Bulger biopic Black Mass (2015), Angiulo is portrayed by Bill Haims.

== Sources ==
- Lehr, Dick; O'Neill, Gerard (2000). Black mass: the Irish mob, the FBI, and a devil's deal. PublicAffairs. ISBN 978-1-891620-40-9.
- Reppetto, Thomas (2007). Bringing Down the Mob: The War Against the American Mafia (reprint ed.). Macmillan. ISBN 978-0-8050-8659-1.
