= Wilfred J. Delaney =

American mobster

Wilfred J. Delaney (c. 1937 - August 4, 1964) was an American gangster and member of the McLaughlin Gang who was a friend and associate of Harold Hannon, a contract killer who had murdered boxer Tommy Sullivan in 1957.

== Biography ==
Delaney was born to second-generation Irish-Americans from Leinster, Ireland. He was known as a friend and criminal associate. He detested the old-fashioned and feminine-sounding name "Wilfred" among his friend and preferred to be called "Willy." By the age of 27 Wilfred had an arrest record for rape and armed robbery. While his friend Harold Hannon was the initial target of the murder, Delaney was unfortunate to be in the company of his friend. Casualties of the McLean-McLaughlin war that claimed dozens in the 1960s, Delaney and Hannon were strangled to death and their corpses were tossed into the Boston Harbor, where they were discovered by longshoremen the following day.

Gang leader Buddy McLean used a female friend as a ruse to set up Wilfred. She enticed both Delaney and Hannon to come back to her South Boston apartment for sex. When Wilfred and Harold saw McLean with a few of his men in the girl's apartment they tried to escape but were quickly apprehended by the mobsters. The medical examiner later discovered during the autopsies of both men that the killers had used a butane blow torch and badly burned Hannon's genitals, allegedly to get information from him. After getting the information he wanted he strangled them both and dumped them in Boston Harbor. Delaney did not meet the same slow, agonizing, drawn-out death as Harold Hannon. Wilfred was made to swallow large amounts of sedatives and was strangled after he drifted into unconsciousness. The method used to murder Delaney mimics the murder methods of Mullen Gang mob associate Buddy Leonard, ordered by James J. Bulger and bartender Kenneth Conrad, murdered by Louis Litif.
