= Rocco DiSiglio =

American boxer and gangster

Rocco DiSiglio, also known as Rocky DiSiglio (April 11, 1939, Newton, Massachusetts – April 3, 1966, East Boston, Massachusetts) was an American professional welterweight boxer and associate of the Patriarca crime family who was involved in armed robbery and illegal gambling.

== Boxing career ==
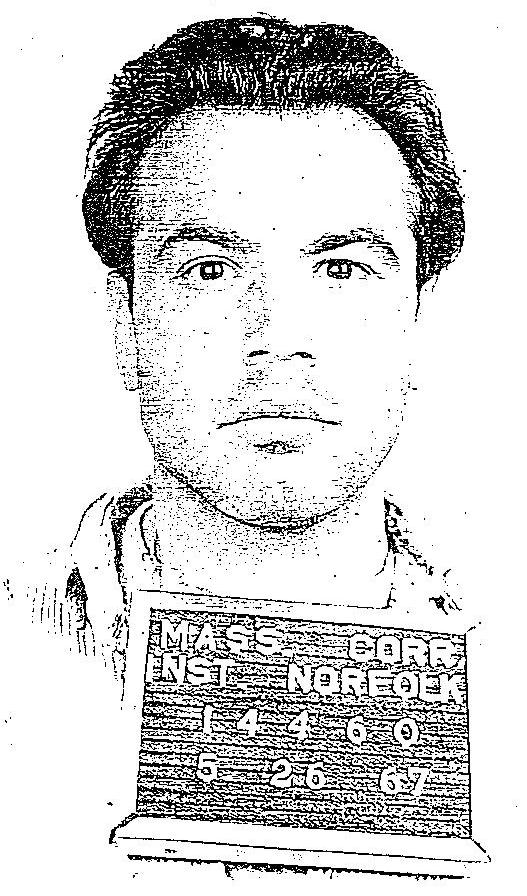
Sparring partner Americo Sacramone in 1967

Little is known about his personal life except that he was born in Newton. His professional boxing record does not even contain a birth date for him. There are also discrepancies in the spelling of his last name, both "DeSiglio" and "DiSiglio" have been used by sources. As a professional boxer he used the "DiSiglio" spelling. He also used the name "Rocky", a derivative of his given name "Rocco". As an amateur boxer before he became professional he trained with future professional boxers Anthony Veranis, Joseph Barboza, Tommy Sullivan, George W. Holden, Americo Sacramone, Edward G. Connors and Joe DeNucci. He weighed between 141 and 148 pounds. He was also a criminal associate of mafioso boxer Joseph Barboza, who would later lead Boston police to the site of his corpse.

Rocco fought his first professional fight on June 10, 1960, against Walter Giles at the Boston Garden in Boston, Massachusetts. For his second match on July 19, 1960, he was matched up against Eddie Grenke at Veterans' Memorial Stadium in Quincy, Massachusetts. This match was Eddie Grenke's professional boxing debut. On October 31, 1961, he knocked out competitor Donald Mendes in Revere, Massachusetts, in 1:50 and won the match. His last winning match was on February 2, 1962, when he knocked out Gene Garrison. Rocco himself was knocked out by Tommy Thibault on November 17, 1961, in Worcester, Massachusetts, and again on January 9, 1962, in Revere by Jackie Lynch. His last professional boxing match was against Jesse Ammons on February 17, 1964, which he lost. His overall professional boxing record was three wins, four losses and one withdrawn match in a total of twenty-seven matches fought.

It is rumored by Howie Carr and former mobster Vincent Teresa that Rocco supplemented his petty boxer's income by being a prizefighter for members of the Patriarca crime family who had interests in illegal betting and professional sports. In 1964 he gave up his dreams of being a professional boxer entirely and became active in the Patriarca crime family.

He married Joanne Dalicandro and lived with her in Newton. They had no children.

== Criminal career ==
In 1966 Stephen Flemmi informed FBI agent H. Paul Rico that Rocco was robbing illegal card and dice games. There had been two dice games and three high-stakes card games that were held up by DiSiglio within three weeks, netting the robbers thousands of dollars. None of the individuals bothered to wear ski masks during and were identifiable. DiSiglio was the "inside man" who saw to it that the door was unlocked for Bernard Zinna and Richard DeVincent to come in with sawed-off shotguns and surprise the card players. One of them made a comment to the card players, "Larry told you not to run." Flemmi advised the Federal Bureau of Investigation (FBI) that this was a reference to Ilario Zannino who oversaw a lucrative illegal barboot game that ran on Sundays in the neighborhood.

The card games were in Flemmi's territory of Newton and Gennaro Anguilo's territory of Lowell, Massachusetts. Anguilo was the gambling czar for the Patriarca crime family which at the time was headed by Raymond Patriarca.

== Retaliation from Gennaro Anguilo ==
Patriarca crime family underboss and acting boss Gennaro Anguilo of the Angiulo Brothers quickly became infuriated with DiSiglio's maverick actions. According to later testimony from Joseph Barboza, Anguilo summoned Zinna and DeVincent and gave them a choice, to either carry out the murder of their former gang mastermind or be murdered themselves.

Zinna and DeVincent set up DiSiglio at a bar in East Boston, luring DiSiglio to ride with them in his own car. They drove over to a dark street and exited the car under the guise of picking up a stolen car for a robbery they had planned. As DiSiglio sat in the driver's seat, he was shot three times at close range in the head by DeVincent. The murderers then drove the car out to Danvers, Massachusetts and left it in the woods nearby.

Shortly after the murder, Joseph Barboza became a stool pigeon and he identified DiSiglio's triggermen as police officers in the Boston Police Department. Barboza later revealed the location of where they had dumped DiSiglio's corpse to the police.

In August 1967, after H. Paul Rico testified before a Suffolk county grand jury about his conversations with Joseph Barboza concerning the murder of DiSiglio, the Boston SAC sent an urgent teletype to J. Edgar Hoover at 1:03 a.m. The Special Agent in charge noted that Suffolk County District Attorney Garret Bryne was commented that this "tremendous penetration into the La Cosa Nostra and the hoodlum element was effected through the outstanding investigative efforts of the FBI and his office."

In 1968, Anguilo, Zinna and DeVincent were arrested and charged with first degree homicide but later acquitted.
