= Tom Sullivan (boxer) =

American boxer (1919–1957)

Thomas Sullivan, also known as "Tommy", and "Irish Tommy" (July 9, 1919 – December 22, 1957, in South Boston) was an American professional light heavyweight boxer whose murder remains unsolved.

== Early life and background ==
Mary Sullivan was a doting mother who supported her only son Tommy throughout his professional boxing career. In Joseph Barboza's autobiography Barboza, Sullivan is wrongly identified as "Rocky", not "Tommy". Thomas was known in the neighborhood as a "tough puncher" who later went to work as a longshoreman in Boston, Massachusetts and lived with his mother on East Fifth Street. Even after his boxing career finished he remained physically fit from working as a longshoreman on the Boston waterfront and sparred at a gym to stay in shape.

After his murder not far from the front steps of his house on East Fifth Street, Mary was overcome with emotional distress and shock and confined herself to her bed. She died soon afterward, at eighty-three. A newspaper quoted neighbors as saying that her son's murder would "kill her." She was too grief-stricken and emotionally distraught to attend his funeral at Gates of Heaven Parish located at 615 East Fourth Street.

== Boxing career ==
At the age of twenty, Tommy started his career as a professional boxer. He was a local celebrity in South Boston. On March 17, 1942 Tommy had his first professional boxing match against Johnny Lawless in Portland, Maine. During this match Lawless retired in his corner after the second round, due to a laceration over his eye that he received from Sullivan. On June 9, 1942 he fought Dave Hoblitzel in Portland, Maine. The bout with Hoblitzel was the boxing match that brought up allegations of corruption. On March 18, 1946 he fought against Jimmy Fields in Boston, Massachusetts. Fields fought the fight against Sullivan under the ring moniker "John Henry Eskew". Before a large crowd totaling 10,817, Eskew dropped Sullivan for a count of two in the second round. Following the knockdown, an angry Sullivan continued on and gave Eskew a brutal beating over the next two rounds. He left Fields draped over the ropes in the fourth round and won by a technical knockout. On October 14, 1946 he fought George Kochan at the Mechanics Building in Boston. During the fight he was knocked down twice before coming back to stop Kochan. This was considered "a savage slugging match." On December 14, 1946 Tommy was matched up against Al Priest in Boston. This was the largest gate ever attracted at an indoor boxing match in Boston up to that time. 13,250 spectators attended the sport, the ring accumulated $59,944 in total. On July 15, 1946 Tommy fought Anthony Jones. The referee stopped the fight with Jones reeling about the ring helplessly. Jones was winning at the end of the sixth round, but Sullivan dropped him a 9-count in round seven, and launched a "hurricane attack" in the eighth which caused the fight to be stopped. On June 2, 1947 he fought against Coley Welch. He successfully knocked down Welch twice in the third round and one in the seventh round. His last professional fight was on January 21, 1949 against Johnny Carter in Worcester, Massachusetts.

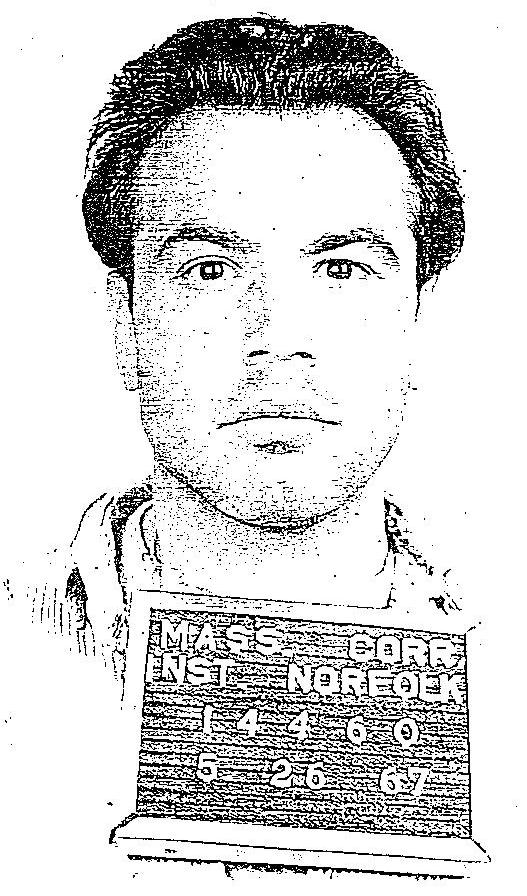
Competitor Americo Sacramone in 1967

He fought with an orthodox stance and boxed 143 rounds over the span of his short career winning twenty of them with fourteen knock outs and two losses. Thomas was considered by many to be one of the more successful boxers that came out of Boston during that time period, more than Edward G. Connors, Anthony Veranis, Rocco DiSiglio and Americo Sacramone.

== Barroom brawl with Edward McLaughlin ==
Thomas had resentment and anger towards the McLaughlin gang, and the gang leader George McLaughlin who had attempted to extort one of his close friends for money in early December. This infuriated him to no end. Two weeks before he was murdered, he made the mistake of getting into a vicious bar room brawl with Edward McLaughlin. By mob associates it was considered a good battle because both McLaughlin and Sullivan were ex-professionals, but Sullivan had a more successful bout than McLaughlin and had been a main event celebrity fighter. Edward hit Sullivan from behind with what may have been a length of iron pipe, knocking him to the floor. The fight played out in the barroom and then made its way out into the street. Edward, now badly beaten, finally gave up and rolled under a car parked in the street to get away. Tommy was relentless in his attack on the gangster, that much is certain. What is less certain is the claim that he lifted up one end of the car and propped one of the wheels up on the curb allowing him access to McLaughlin.

== Gangland slaying ==
On December 22, 1957, Tommy was shot and killed on East Fifth Street as he was making his way back to work. During the initial murder investigation, homicide detectives became quickly convinced that his murder was related to disturbances on the waterfront that involved out-of-town racketeers. Two suspects, including Edward McLaughlin, were brought in for questioning about the murder. One provided an airtight alibi clearing him of any suspicion in the murder while McLaughlin remained under suspicion. The case eventually went cold, and no one was ever charged or convicted in the murder of Sullivan. Howie Carr states that Sullivan's killer was Harold Hannon.

Hannon was later murdered in the ensuing Irish Mob wars. He was garroted with piano wire after which his corpse was thrown into Boston Harbor, on August 20, 1964.

Sullivan's bar-brawling foe Edward McLaughlin was shot dead at a bus stop in West Roxbury, Massachusetts, in October 1965.

== External references ==
- Tom Sullivan at BoxRec (registration required)
- brothersbulger.com Tommy Sullivan
- brothersbulger.com Harold Hannon
