= Aaron Michlewitz =

Massachusetts politician

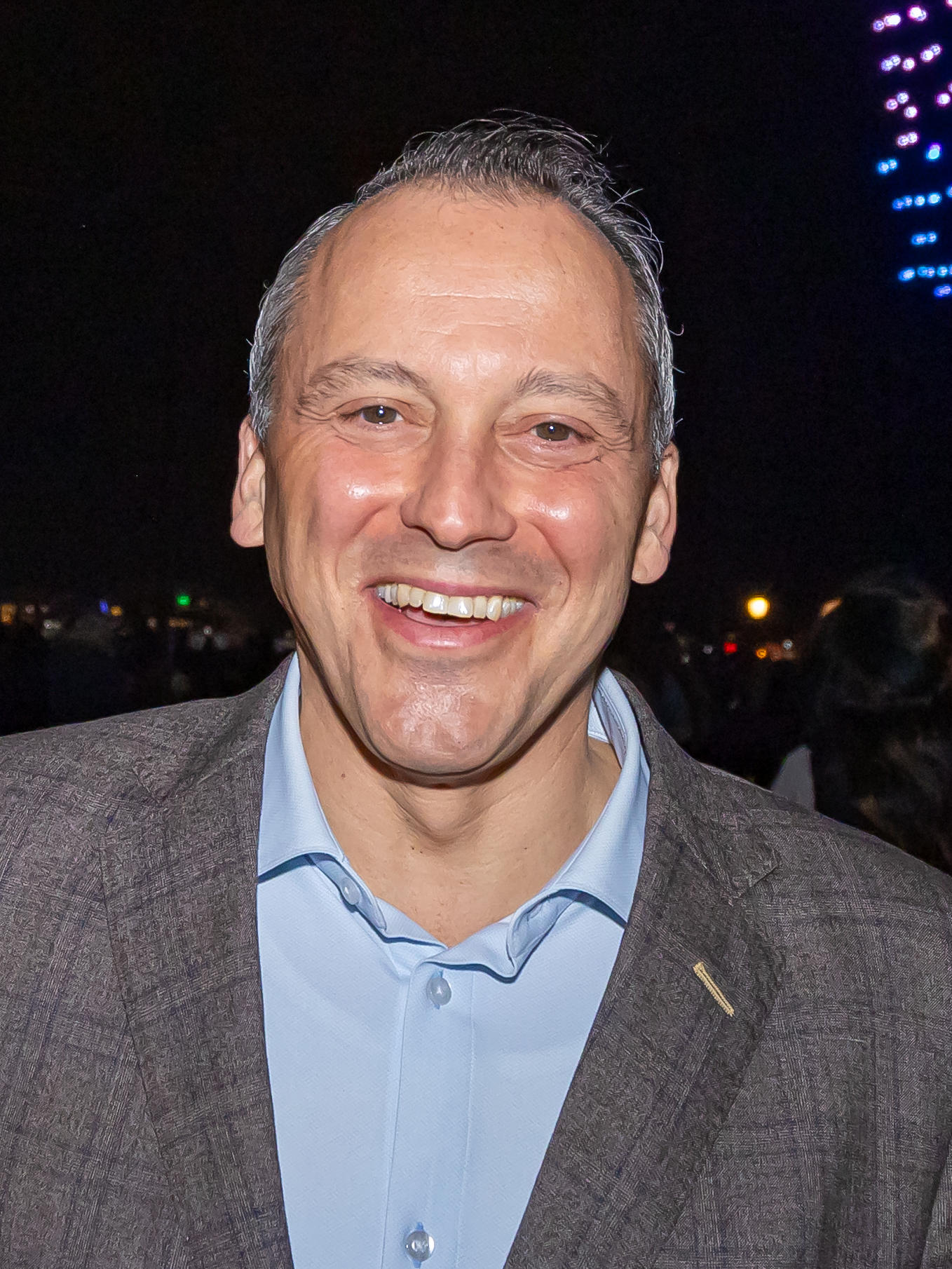
- Michlewitz in 2025

Chair of the Ways and Means Committee of the Massachusetts House of Representatives
- Incumbent
- Assumed office February 14, 2019
- Preceded by: Jeff Sanchez

Member of the Massachusetts House of Representatives from the 3rd Suffolk district
- Incumbent
- Assumed office July 8, 2009
- Preceded by: Sal DiMasi

Personal details
- Born: June 7, 1978 (age 48) North End, Boston
- Party: Democratic
- Education: Northeastern University

Aaron Michlewitz is a Democratic member of the Massachusetts House of Representatives from the 3rd Suffolk District, within the city of Boston, Massachusetts. The 3rd Suffolk District encompasses the North End, Waterfront, Chinatown, South End, Financial District, Bay Village, Leather District, and parts of Beacon Hill, and Back Bay neighborhoods.

== Political career ==
Prior to running for office, Michlewitz worked for Salvatore DiMasi, Speaker of the Massachusetts House of Representatives, as his Constituent Services Director from 2004 until DiMasi's resignation on January 27, 2009. Michlewitz was elected to the House in a special election following DiMasi's resignation.

Michlewitz serves as the House Chairman of the Ways and Means Committee. He has previously served as Chairman of the Joint Committee on Financial Services, the Joint Committee on Public Service, and the Joint Committee on Election Laws.

In 2016, Michlewitz was a leading author of Massachusetts's landmark legislation dealing with transportation network companies, such as Uber and Lyft. Michlewitz has also worked on crafting legislation that would regulate short-term residential rentals, such as Airbnb.

Michlewitz secured a $200,000 grant that enabled the North End Historical Society to open its first physical location, on Prince Street in the North End of Boston. The 850-square-foot (79 m^{2}) location opened in July 2026.

== Personal life ==
Michlewitz and his wife, Maria, live in the North End. He is Jewish.

Michlewitz and Wu share a close personal friendship. Wu has described him as her "big brother in the business [of politics]".

== See also ==
- 2019–2020 Massachusetts legislature
- 2021–2022 Massachusetts legislature
