= Bernard McLaughlin =

Bernard McLaughlin may refer to:

- Bernie McLaughlin (1921–1961), Irish-American gangster
- Bernard Joseph McLaughlin (1912–2015), American Roman Catholic bishop
