= List of historical societies in Massachusetts =

The following is a list of historical societies in the state of Massachusetts, United States.

== Organizations ==
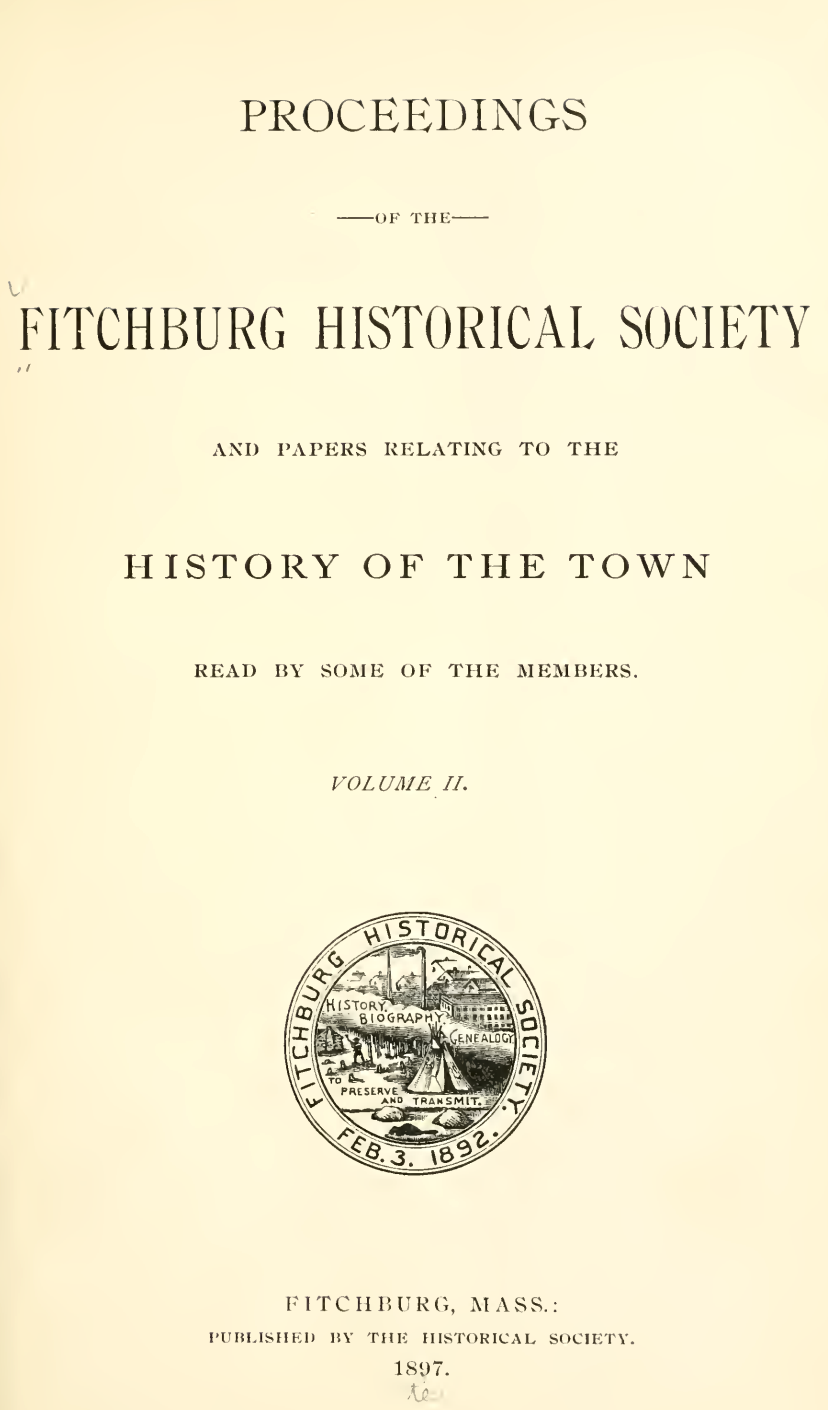
1897 Proceedings of the Fitchburg Historical Society, volume 2

Cover of a 1913 publication of the Nantucket Historical Association

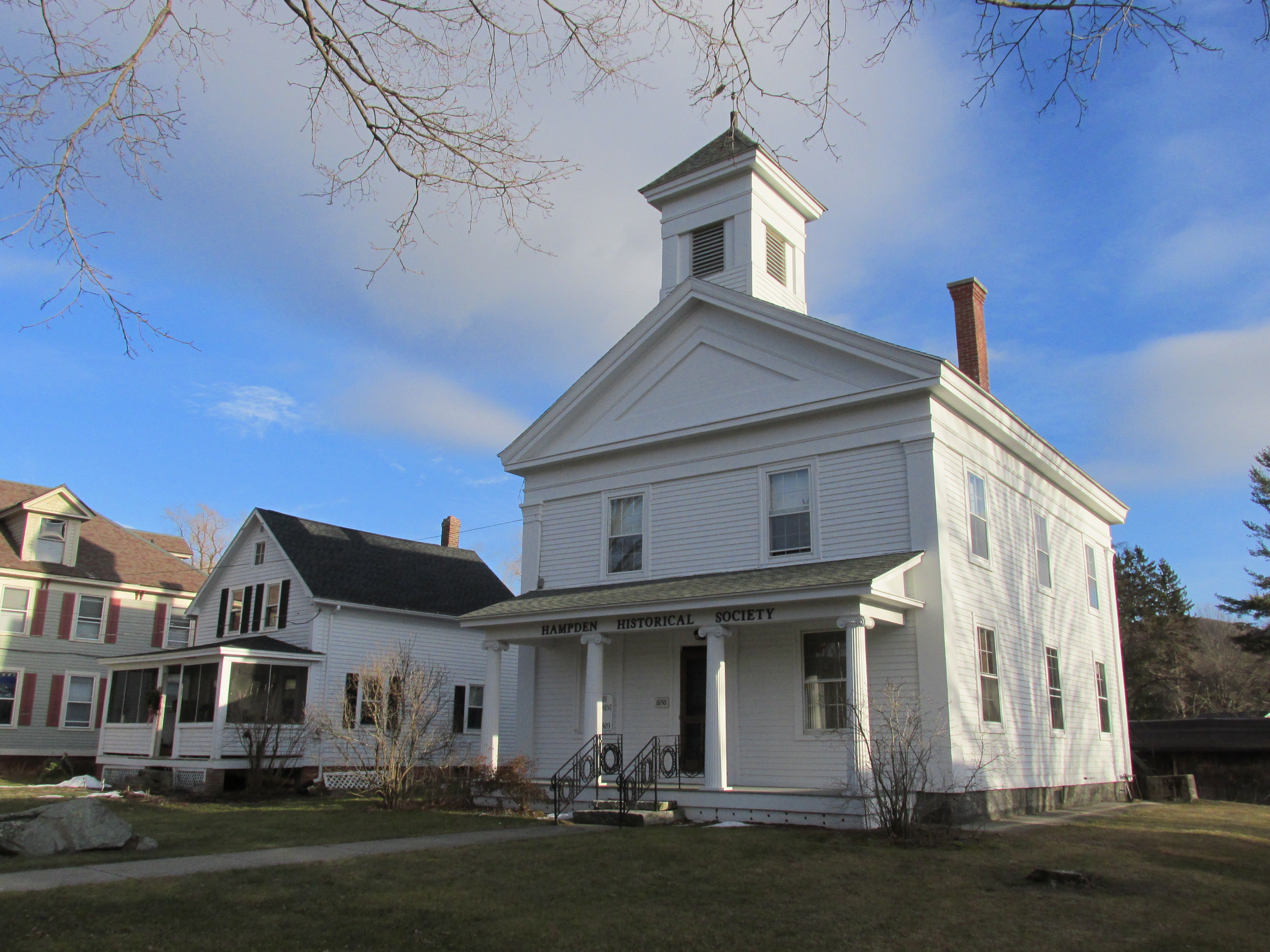
Hampden Historical Society building in Massachusetts (photo 2013)

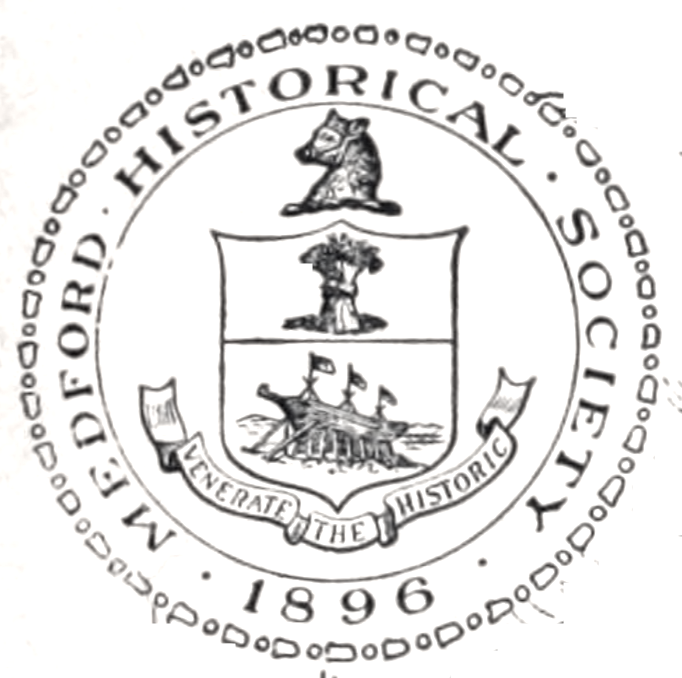
Logo of the Medford Historical Society, Massachusetts, circa 1896

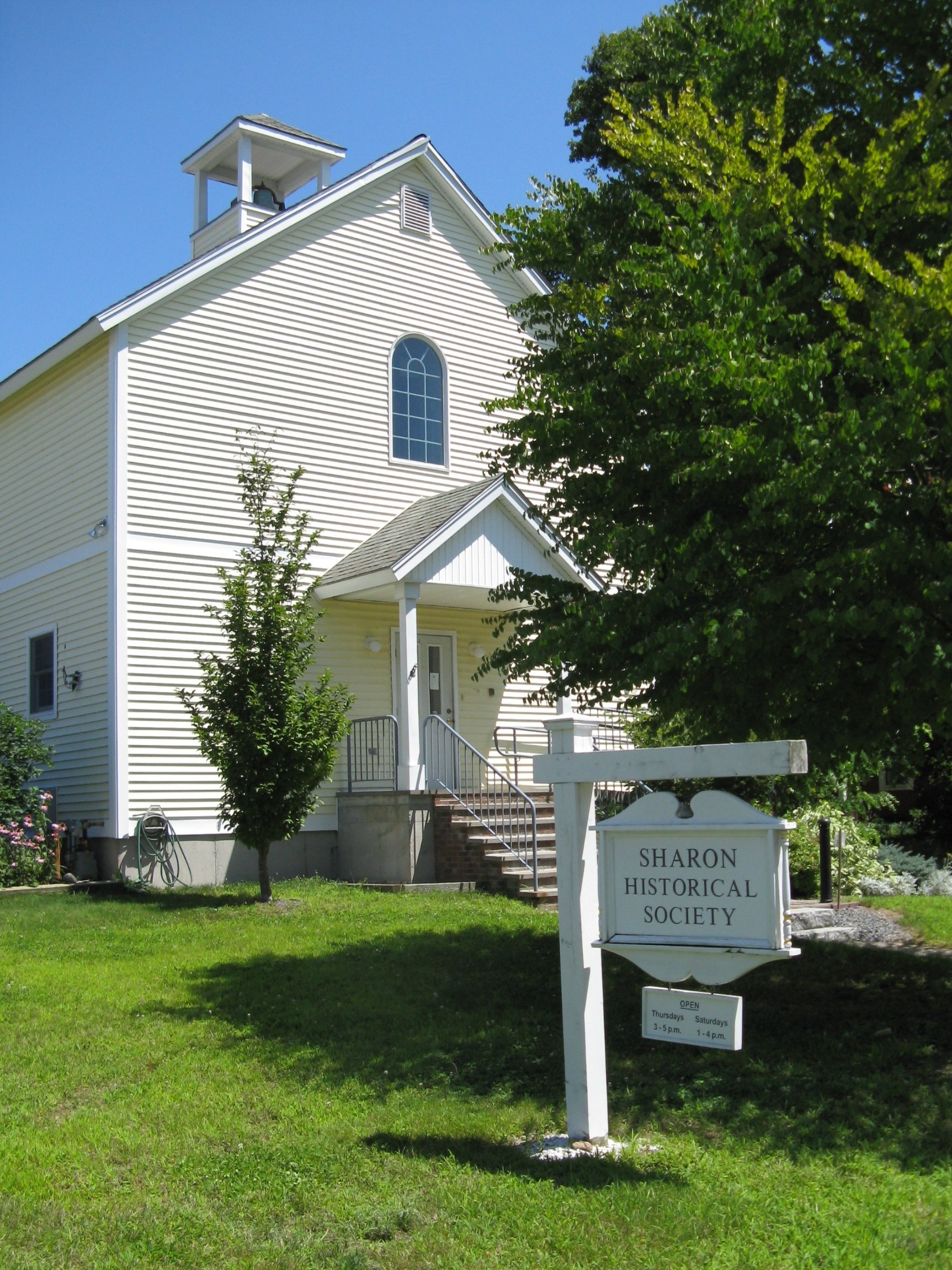
Sharon Historical Society sign and building in Massachusetts (photo 2009)

- Historical Society of Old Abington in Plymouth
- Acton Historical Society
- Acushnet Historical Society
- Adams Historical Society, Massachusetts
- Agawam Historical Association
- Alden Kindred of America
- American Antiquarian Society
- Amherst Historical Society
- Andover Historical Society, Massachusetts
- Annisquam Historical Society in Gloucester
- Arlington Historical Society, Massachusetts
- Asbury Grove Historical Society
- Ashburnham Historical Society
- Ashfield Historical Society
- Athol Historical Society
- Attleboro Historical Volunteers
- Auburn Historical Society
- Babson Historical Association
- Barnstable Historical Society
- Barre Historical Society
- Bay State Historical Society
- Belchertown Historical Association
- Belmont Historical Society
- Berkley Historical Society
- Berkshire County Historical Society
- Berlin Art and Historical Society
- Bernardston Historical Society
- Beverly Historical Society
- Billerica Historical Society
- Black Tavern Historical Society of Dudley
- Blandford Historical Society
- Bolton Historical Society
- Boston & Maine Railroad Historical Society
- Boston Fire Historical Society
- The Historical Society, Boston University (active 1998–2014)
- The Bostonian Society
- Bourne Historical Society
- Boxborough Historical Society
- Boxford Historical Society
- Boylston Historical Society and Museum
- Braintree Historical Society
- Brewster Historical Society
- Old Bridgewater Historical Society
- Brighton-Allston Historical Society & Heritage Museum
- Brockton Historical Society
- Brookline Historical Society
- Buckland Historical Society
- Burlington Historical Commission
- Cambridge Historical Society
- Canton Historical Society
- Cape Ann Historical Association
- Cape Cod Genealogical Society
- Carlisle Historical Society
- Centerville Historical Society
- Charlemont Historical Society
- Charlestown Historical Society
- Charlestown Veterans History Project
- Chatham Historical Society
- Chelmsford Historical Society
- Chelsea Historical Society
- Cheshire Historical Commission
- Chester Historical Society
- Chesterfield Historical Society
- Chicopee Historical Society
- Chinese Historical Society of New England
- Clinton Historical Society (Massachusetts)
- Cohasset Historical Society 14
- Colrain Historical Society
- Colonial Society of Massachusetts
- Concord Antiquarian Society
- Conway Historical Society
- Cotuit Historical Society
- Cummington Historical Commission
- Cuttyhunk Historical Society
- Dalton Historical Commission
- Danvers Historical Society
- Dartmouth Historical and Arts Society
- Dedham Historical Society and Museum
- Dennis Historical Society
- Dighton Historical Society
- Dorchester Historical Society
- Douglas Historical Society
- Dover Historical Society
- Dracut Historical Society
- Duxbury Rural and Historical Society
- East Blackstone Quaker Meeting House & Cemetery Historical Association
- East Bridgewater Historical Society
- Easthampton Historical Society
- Easton Historical Society
- Essex Historical Society & Shipbuilding Museum
- Essex Institute (active 1848–1992)
- Fairhaven Historical Society
- Fall River Historical Society
- Fitchburg Historical Society
- Fort Taber Historical Association
- Foxborough Historical Society
- Framingham Historical and Natural History Society
- Georgetown Historical Society
- Goshen Historical Society
- Grafton Historical Society
- Granby Historical Association
- Granville Historical Society
- Great Barrington Historical Society and Museum
- Historical Society of Greenfield
- Groton Historical Society
- Hampden Historical Society
- Groveland Historical Society
- Hadley Historical Society
- Halifax Historical Society
- Hamilton Historical Society
- Historical Society of the Town of Hampden
- Hanover Historical Society
- Hanson Historical Society
- Hardwick Historical Society
- Harvard Historical Society
- Harwich Historical Society
- Hatfield Historical Society
- Haverhill Historical Society
- Heath Historical Society
- Hetty Green Historical
- Hingham Historical Society
- Historic New England
- Holbrook Historical Society
- Holden Historical Society
- Holliston Historical Society
- Hopkinton Historical Society
- Hubbardston Historical Society
- Hudson Historical Society
- Hyannis Historical Society
- Hyde Park Historical Society
- Ipswich Historical Society
- Jamaica Plain Historical Society
- Jewish Historical Society of Western Massachusetts
- Jones River Village Historical Society
- Lafayette-Durfee Historical Foundation
- Lakeville Historical Society
- Lancaster Historical Society
- Lanes Cove Historical Association
- Historical Society of Lawrence
- Lawrence History Center
- Lee Historical Society
- Leicester Historical Society
- Lenox Historical Society
- Leominster Historical Society
- Leverett Historical Society
- Lexington History Museums
- Lincoln Historical Society
- Littleton Historical Society
- Longmeadow Historical Society
- Lowell Historical Society
- Lunenburg Historical Society
- Lynn Museum & Historical Society
- Lynnfield Historical Society
- Magnolia Historical Society
- Malden Historical Society
- Manchester Historical Museum (formerly Manchester Historical Society)
- Mansfield Historical Society
- Marblehead Museum & Historical Society
- Marion Natural History Society
- Marlborough Historical Society
- Marshall Street Historical Society
- Marshfield Historical Society
- Marstons Mills Historical Society
- Mattapoisett Historical Society
- Maynard Historical Society
- Medfield Historical Society
- Medford Historical Society
- Medway Historical Society
- Melrose Historical Society
- Mendon Historical Society
- Methuen Historical Society
- Middleborough Historical Association
- Middleton Historical Society
- Military Historical Society of Massachusetts
- Millbury Historical Society
- Milton Historical Society
- Monson Historical Society
- Monterey Historical Society
- Mount Washington Historical Society
- Nahant Historical Society
- Nantucket Historical Association
- Narragansett Historical Society in Templeton
- Natick Historical Society
- Needham Historical Society
- New Bedford Historical Society
- New Braintree Historical Society
- New Marlborough Historical Society
- Historical Society of Old Newbury
- Historic Newton
- North Adams Historical Society
- North Andover Historical Society
- North Attleborough Historical Society
- North End Historical Society, Boston
- North Reading Historical and Antiquarian Society
- Northborough Historical Society
- Northbridge Historical Society
- Northfield Historical Society
- Historic Northampton
- Norton Historical Society
- Norwell Historical Society
- Norwood Historical Society
- Old Colony Historical Society
- Orange Historical Society
- Orleans Historical Society
- Osterville Historical Society
- Otis Historical Society
- Palmer Historical and Cultural Center
- Peabody Historical Society
- Pelham Historical Society
- Pembroke Historical Society
- Pepperell Historical Society
- Petersham Historical Society
- Historical Society of Phillipston
- Photographic Historical Society of New England
- Plainfield Historical Society
- Plymouth Antiquarian Society
- Plympton Historical Society
- Pocumtuck Valley Memorial Association
- Princeton Historical Society
- Quincy Historical Society
- Ramapogue Historical Society
- Raynham Historical Commission
- Raynham Historical Society
- Reading Antiquarian Society
- Rehoboth Antiquarian Society
- Richmond Historical Society
- Rochester Historical Society
- Roslindale Historical Society, Boston
- Roxbury Historical Society, Boston
- Rowe Historical Society
- Rowley Historical Society
- Village Improvement and Historical Society of Royalston
- Rumford Historical Association
- Rutland Historical Society
- Salem Historical Society
- Salisbury Historical Society
- Sandwich Historical Society and Glass Museum
- Sandy Bay Historical Society and Museum in Gloucester
- Sandwich Historical Society and Glass Museum
- Historical Society of Santuit & Cotuit
- Saugus Historical Society
- Scituate Historical Society
- Sharon Historical Society
- Shelburne Historical Society
- Sherborn Historical Society
- Shirley Historical Society
- Shrewsbury Historical Society
- Shutesbury Historical Commission
- Sippican Historical Society in Marion
- Somerset Historical Society
- Somerville Historical Society
- South End Historical Society, Boston
- South Gardner Historical Society
- South Hadley Historical Society
- South Shore Historical Society
- Southampton Historical Society
- Southborough Historical Society
- Southbridge Historical Society
- Southwick Historical Society
- Spencer Historical Society
- Sterling Historical Society
- Stoneham Historical Society
- Stoughton Historical Society
- Stow Historical Society
- Sudbury Historical Society
- Sutton Historical Society
- Swampfield Historical Society
- Swampscott Historical Society
- Swansea Historical Society
- Swift River Historical Society
- Swift River Valley Historical Society
- Tewksbury Historical Society
- Topsfield Historical Society
- Townsend Historical Society
- Truro Historical Society
- Tyngsboro Dunstable Historical Society
- Uxbridge Historical Society
- Valley Womens History Collaborative
- Wakefield Historical Society
- Walpole Historical Society
- Waltham Historical Society
- Ware Historical Society
- Wareham Historical Society
- Historical Society of Watertown
- Wayland Historical Society
- Webster-Dudley Historical Society
- Wellesley Historical Society
- Wellfleet Historical Society
- West Barnstable Historical Society
- West Boylston Historical Society
- West End Museum, Boston
- West Newbury Historical Society
- West Stockbridge Historical Society
- Westborough Historical Society
- Western Hampden Historical Society
- Westford Historical Society
- Westminster Historical Society
- Weston Historical Society
- Westport Historical Society
- Westwood Historical Society
- Weymouth Historical Society
- Whately Historical Society
- Williamsburg Historical Society
- Winchendon Historical Society
- Winchester Historical Society
- Winthrop Improvement and Historical Association
- Woburn Historical Society
- Worcester Historical Fire Society
- Worcester Historical Museum (formerly Worcester Historical Society)
- Worthington Historical Society
- Historical Society of Old Yarmouth

== See also ==
- History of Massachusetts
- List of museums in Massachusetts
- National Register of Historic Places listings in Massachusetts
- List of historical societies in the United States
