= Bernie McLaughlin =

American gangster and leader of The McLaughlin Brothers

- Born: 1921; Boston, Massachusetts, U.S.
- Died: October 31, 1961 (aged 39–40); Charlestown, Massachusetts, U.S.
- Cause of death: Gun shots
- Occupation: Crime boss
- Relatives: Edward McLaughlin (brother); George McLaughlin (brother)
- Allegiance: McLaughlin Brothers

Bernard McLaughlin (1921 – October 31, 1961) was an American gangster from Charlestown, Massachusetts, and leader of "The McLaughlin Brothers" gang.

== Early life ==
Before Bernie formed his own crew he was a loan shark and enforcer for the Angiulo Brothers of the North End, Boston. After the Irish gangs decided to break away from Italian control, Bernie and his brothers (Edward "Punchy" McLaughlin and George McLaughlin (aka Little George, July 7, 1927 – January 2022) took over the rackets in and around Charlestown, Massachusetts. They soon built a reputation as a fearsome crew, and carried out contract killings for gangsters all over New England, including the Patriarca crime family and the Winter Hill Gang. He favoured carrying a sash weight wrapped in newspaper for breaking the arms and legs of delinquent debtors. George was a best friend of Harold Hannon, who was found strangled and beaten to death in Boston Harbor by McLean gang associates.

== Precipitation of the Irish Gangs' War ==
Soon after, at a Labor Day party on Salisbury Beach, George McLaughlin was badly beaten by two members of the Winter Hill Gang for drunkenly groping the girlfriend of mobster Alex Rocco (then known as Alex 'Bobo' Petricone). Believing McLaughlin to be dead after the severe beating, the men loaded him into the car to dispose of his body. However, when they realized that he was still alive, they dumped him on a hospital lawn, and went to report to Winter Hill Gang boss James "Buddy" McLean.

When Bernie was told about the chain of events by Buddy, at the time a friend of his, he demanded that Buddy turn over his two men. McLean allegedly said that George was "out of line" and refused to turn them over.

Enraged, the McLaughlins wired a bomb under Buddy's family car that same night. When Buddy surprised them, they fled, but not before McLean recognized them. He was infuriated and immediately went looking for Bernie.

== Murder and aftermath ==
In October 1961, Buddy McLean, Alex Rocco, and corrupt police officer Russell Nicholson found Bernie in front of the Morning Glory cafe in Charlestown and shot him dead. Despite the large crowd, not one witness agreed to violate the neighborhood code of silence and the three went free. Soon afterwards, Russ Nicholson was taken from the street and murdered by Bernie's brothers Punchy and Georgie; McLean was killed in 1965; Rocco became an actor and died in 2015.
