= Ilario Zannino =

American mobster (1920–1996)

- Zannino's 1987 prison mugshot
- Born: Ilario Maria Antonio Zannino; June 15, 1920; Boston, Massachusetts, U.S.
- Died: February 27, 1996 (aged 75); U.S. Medical Center for Federal Prisoners, Springfield, Missouri, U.S.
- Resting place: St. Joseph Cemetery
- Other name: Larry Baione
- Occupation: Mobster
- Known for: Consigliere of the Patriarca crime family
- Predecessor: Nicolò Angiulo
- Successor: Joseph Russo
- Allegiance: Patriarca crime family
- Conviction: Interstate transportation of stolen goods (1970)

Ilario Zannino (June 15, 1920 – February 27, 1996) was an American mobster who was a member of the Patriarca crime family of New England. Zannino was said to be the third-highest-ranking figure in the Boston faction of the Patriarca family, rising to the position of consigliere. He was a paternal nephew or a paternal first cousin of Boston Patriarca family mobster Phillip Zannino.

== Criminal career ==
Ilario Zannino was born in Roxbury, Boston to Joseph Zannino and Isabella LaGrada and raised in a house on Shawmut Avenue in South End, Boston. He stood at 5'7" and weighed 160 pounds with brown eyes and dark brown hair. Although he was born in the North End, like Gennaro Angiulo he moved at an early age to Franklin, Massachusetts. Zannino moved to South Boston in the late 1930s, and graduated from Franklin High School in 1938. His relatives owned a pig farm in Stoughton, Massachusetts where it was believed that the body of murdered Greek-American mob associate James Bratsos was buried in 1954, although no one has ever been charged in the disappearance of Bratsos. In his high school yearbook, he stated intentions to attend medical school. His classmates called him "Zip" which later become ironically the same nickname of FBI Special Agent John Connolly who would later successfully prosecute him for his criminal activities. Zannino later went by the alias "Larry Baione". He allegedly stabbed a waiter to death in a South End restaurant for slow service. He was classmates with a future elementary school principal named Larry who were in the "Let's Go" youth gang together. In 1954, Ilario attended his old friend Larry's wedding, pressed a $100 bill in his hand and said, "Buy yourself a necktie kid." Zannino rose from street tough to extorting businesses and beating up debtors all over town.

In 1949, Zannino married Isabel Tawa (1924–2011), who worked as a saleswoman at Gilchrist's department store and later owned and managed properties in South Boston. He and his wife had four children; Joseph (1951–2021), Lorraine, Karen, and Jayne. In a 1981 conversation with Donato "Danny" Angiulo, which was covertly recorded by the Federal Bureau of Investigation (FBI), Zannino agreed that a Mafioso's wife is "not supposed to know what you do for a living" and claimed that his wife knew only that he had a secret hiding place in his house, saying: "After all, Danny, when you got three million ... dollars you can’t be too secretive. And you know, Danny, good wives don’t want to know what ... you do".

On April 7, 1966, Zannino was introduced to Erwin Soroko at the Intermission Lounge in Boston by the bar owner Joseph Balliro as a potential buyer of stolen jewelry in Soroko's possession. Zannino agreed with Soroko that his appraiser, Lewis Strauss, would examine the jewelry. The following day, Strauss appraised the merchandise at the Northwood, New Hampshire cottage where the jewelry was hidden and, after brief negotiations, reached an agreement with Soroko on a price of $60,000 and returned to Boston with the jewelry. Soroko subsequently received payments personally from Zannino and his associate Peter Limone on two occasions. Later that year, Soroko was convicted in state court of the March 24, 1966 robbery of Cortell's jewelry store in Boston, which brought the stolen merchandise into his possession. He was sentenced to ten to twenty years in prison. In 1970, Soroko and his wife Joanne served as the chief prosecution witnesses in a federal trial in which Zannino, Limone, Strauss and Balliro were convicted for transporting or aiding and abetting the transport of goods in interstate commerce knowing the same to have been stolen.

Zannino was an extortionist, and his victims at one time included Gennaro "Jerry" Angiulo, who made a payment to New England Mafia boss Raymond "the Man" Patriarca to have Zannino's shakedown ceased. Zannino then went on to work for Angiulo as an enforcer. By 1969, he was identified as a capodecina in the Boston faction of the Patriarca crime family. Zannino was also a close associate of Stephen "The Rifleman" Flemmi, an FBI informant who was connected with Italian organized crime in Boston's North End as well as the Winter Hill Gang, an Irish mob group in Somerville. He courted Flemmi for membership in the Mafia.

Along with Patriarca family soldier Joseph "J.R." Russo, Zannino was dispatched by Jerry Angiulo to assassinate Joseph "The Animal" Barboza, a former Patriarca enforcer and hitman who testified for the government against the New England Mafia and became the first person to enter the Federal Witness Protection Program. Barboza was living in Santa Rosa, California under the alias "Joe Donati" when he befriended James Chalmas, a small-time criminal originally from South Boston who tipped off Angiulo about Barboza's whereabouts. On February 11, 1976, Barboza was shotgunned to death from a passing van as he approached his parked car after leaving Chalmas' apartment in the Sunset District of San Francisco. The identity of Barboza's killers remained unknown until Zannino was secretly recorded by the FBI talking about the murder in 1981. During a conversation with two Patriarca soldati ("soldiers"), he explained his decision to recommend Russo for a promotion, describing him as "a very brilliant guy, who stepped right out with a carbine" during the Barboza murder. He further stated: "We clipped Barboza. I was with him [Russo] every day. He made snap decisions. There, he couldn't get in touch with nobody. And he accomplished the whole pot."

=== Racketeering conviction ===
In 1981, FBI agents acquired details on the interiors of two Mafia controlled apartments in the North End. With court approval, agents picked the locks early in the morning and planted covert listening devices that produced over 800 hours of recordings. Between January and May 1981, the FBI secretly recorded 850 hours of conversations after planting bugs at Zannino's headquarters on North Margin Street and at Jerry Angiulo's "Dog House" on Prince Street. Zannino and Angiulo were taped discussing six murders with their associates. During one conversation, Zannino recounted his and Joseph Russo's roles in the Joseph Barboza killing of 1976. In another discussion, he and Angiulo recalled the murder of another underworld figure, Walter Bennett, by Frank Salemme. Zannino later claimed in court after being convicted that he was drunk on red wine at the time he was taped, stating in the recording: "I want to kill Harvey Cohen very shortly".

The Patriarca family was on the verge of a gang war with the Winter Hill Gang at the time of the recordings as the Irish American gang, which was headquartered out of a Somerville garage, owed the Mafia between $190,000 and $245,000. Zannino became angry at associates of the imprisoned Winter Hill Gang leader Howard Winter and asked Jerry Angiulo: "Why don't we go in that ... garage, right now? With ... machine guns. We'll kill every ... one of these Irishmen." Angiulo did not agree that such an action was merited, however. Zannino was also heard explaining how dangerous it is to kill just one member of the Winter Hill Gang: "If you're clipping people, I always say, make sure you clip the people around him first. Get them together, 'cause everybody's got a friend. He could be the dirtiest motherfucker in the world, but someone that likes this guy, that's the guy that sneaks you." He and Patriarca family soldier John Cincotti were complaining to each other about the problems that they were having with the Winter Hill Gang. Cincotti said: "They don't have the scruples that we have." Zannino agreed: "You know how I knew they weren't Italiano? When they bombed the fucking house. We don't do that."

As a result of the three-year FBI investigation, Zannino was among seven men, also including Samuel Granito and five of the Angiulo brothers, who were indicted by a grand jury on charges of racketeering, illegal gambling, loansharking, and murder on September 20, 1983. Zannino repeatedly asserted that he was unfit to stand trial due to heart problems, a claim that was overruled by federal judges. The prosecution contended that he had suffered only one heart attack in 1977, and that his condition had since been treatable with medication. Three hours after the beginning of the racketeering trial of Zannino and five co-defendants in the Federal District Court in Boston on the date of July 11, 1985, Zannino collapsed, complaining of chest pains, forcing judge David S. Nelson to halt the proceedings. Zannino was subsequently hospitalized at the Massachusetts General Hospital. He was found guilty of racketeering on March 6, 1987.

Sent to prison for loansharking and illegal gambling, Ilaro Zannino died on February 27, 1996, of natural causes at the Medical Center for Federal Prisoners in Springfield, Missouri.

== Bibliography ==
- Bloom, Robert M. Ratting: The Use and Abuse of Informants in the American Justice System. Westport, Connecticut: Greenwood Publishing Group, 2002. ISBN 0-275-96818-9
- United States. Congress. Senate. Committee on Governmental Affairs. Permanent Subcommittee on Investigations. Organized Criminal Activities: south Florida and U.S. Penitentiary, Atlanta, Ga. 1980.
- United States. Congress. Senate. Committee on the Judiciary. Department of Justice Appropriation Authorization Act of 1987: Hearing of the Committee on the Judiciary. 1987.
- United States. Congress. Senate. Committee on Governmental Affairs. Permanent Subcommittee on Investigations. Organized Crime: 25 Years After Valachi : Hearings Before the Permanent Subcommittee of Investigations. 1988.
- United States. Congress. House. Committee on the Judiciary. Subcommittee on Criminal Justice. Oversight Hearing on Organized Crime Strike Forces: Hearing Before the Subcommittee on Criminal Justice. 1989.
- United States. Congress. Senate. Committee on the Judiciary, United States. Congress. Senate. Committee on Governmental Affairs. Permanent Subcommittee on Investigations. Status of the Department of Justice Organized Crime Strike Forces: Joint Hearing Before the Permanent Subcommittee on Investigations. 1990.
