= North End Historical Society =

Historical society in Massachusetts, United States

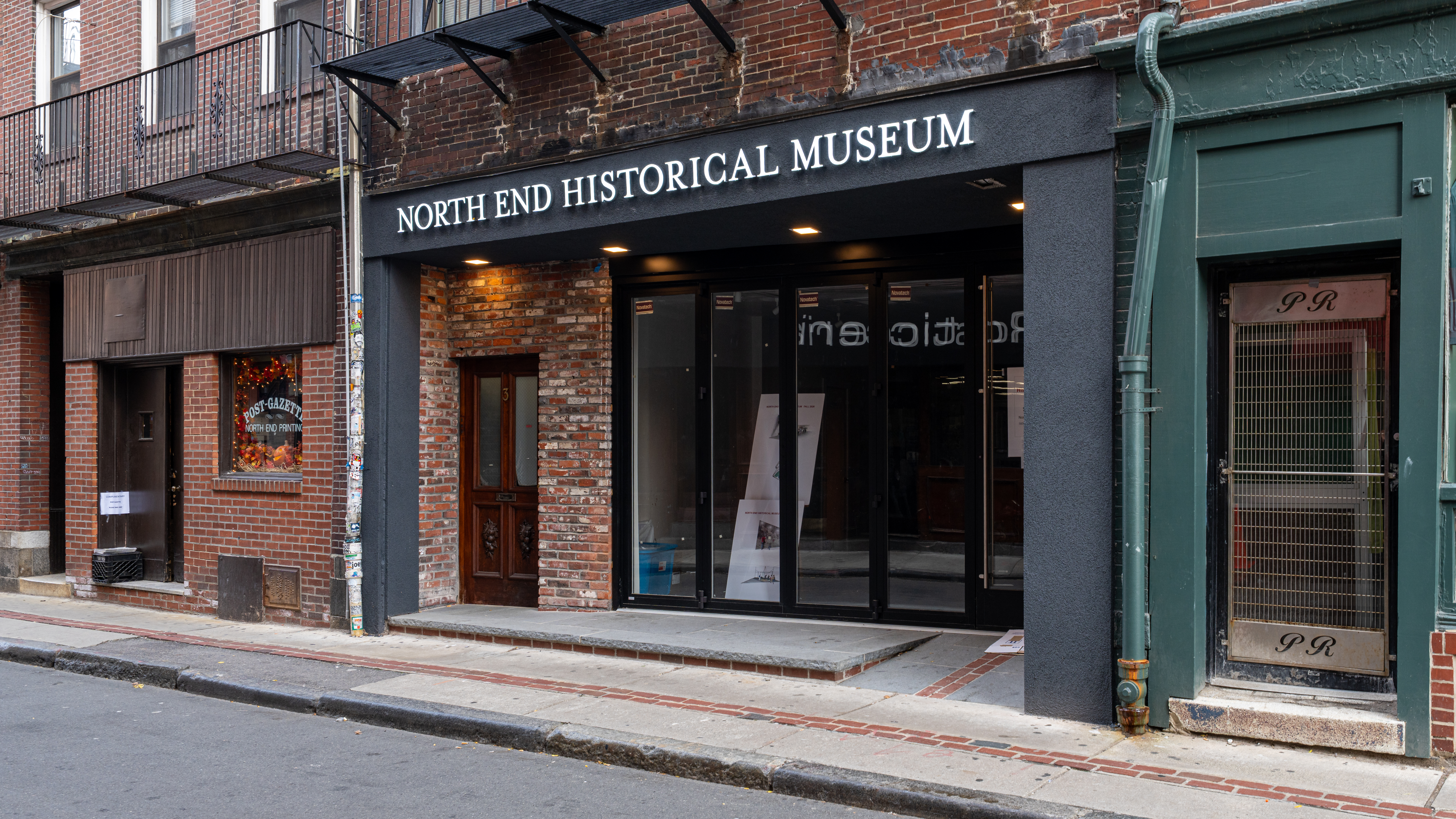
- Formation: 2010; 16 years ago
- Type: 501(c)(3) organization
- Purpose: Preservation of local history
- Location: 3 Prince Street, North End, Boston, Massachusetts, U.S.
- President: Tom Damigella
- Website: www.northendboston.org

The North End Historical Society (NEHS) is a non-profit community organization "committed to uncovering the rich and dynamic history of" the North End neighborhood in Boston, Massachusetts, United States. Incorporated in 2010, the mission of the organization "is to collect and preserve the historical record and material culture of Boston's North End, and to preserve, catalog, and present these resources in service to the wider community through publications, lectures, educational programs, and exhibits."

In April 2025, the organization announced plans to establish its first permanent physical location, at 3 Prince Street in Boston, along the Freedom Trail. The "heritage center" was established to feature exhibits about notable area events including the Great Molasses Flood of 1919 and the Great Brink's Robbery of 1950. Establishing the location was made possible by a $200,000 grant secured by local politician Aaron Michlewitz. The 850-square-foot (79 m^{2}) location opened in July 2026.

== See also ==
- South End Historical Society
- List of historical societies in Massachusetts
