= South End Historical Society =

- Formation: 1966; 60 years ago
- Type: 501(c)(3) organization
- Headquarters: 532 Massachusetts Avenue
- Location: South End, Boston, Massachusetts, U.S.
- President: Michael Leabman
- Website: www.southendhistoricalsociety.org

The South End Historical Society (SEHS) is a non-profit community organization founded in 1966, dedicated to the preservation of the built environment and revitalization of the South End neighborhood in Boston, Massachusetts, United States.

In 1973, the South End neighborhood was placed on the National Register of Historic Places as the largest extant Victorian rowhouse district in the United States. In 1983, the district achieved designation as a Boston Landmark District, by the Boston Landmarks Commission, bringing with it legal protection and public review of alterations to buildings within the district.

Since 1974, the organization has been headquartered at the Francis Dane House located at 532 Massachusetts Avenue in the South End.

Over the course of its existence, the SEHS has worked to retain and restore architectural integrity of the South End. The SEHS supports research, conservation, and education to protect and promote interest in the local historic buildings, monuments, and public squares of the South End.

== See also ==
- North End Historical Society
- List of historical societies in Massachusetts
