= Ipswich Museum (Massachusetts) =

Museum in Ipswich, Massachusetts, United States

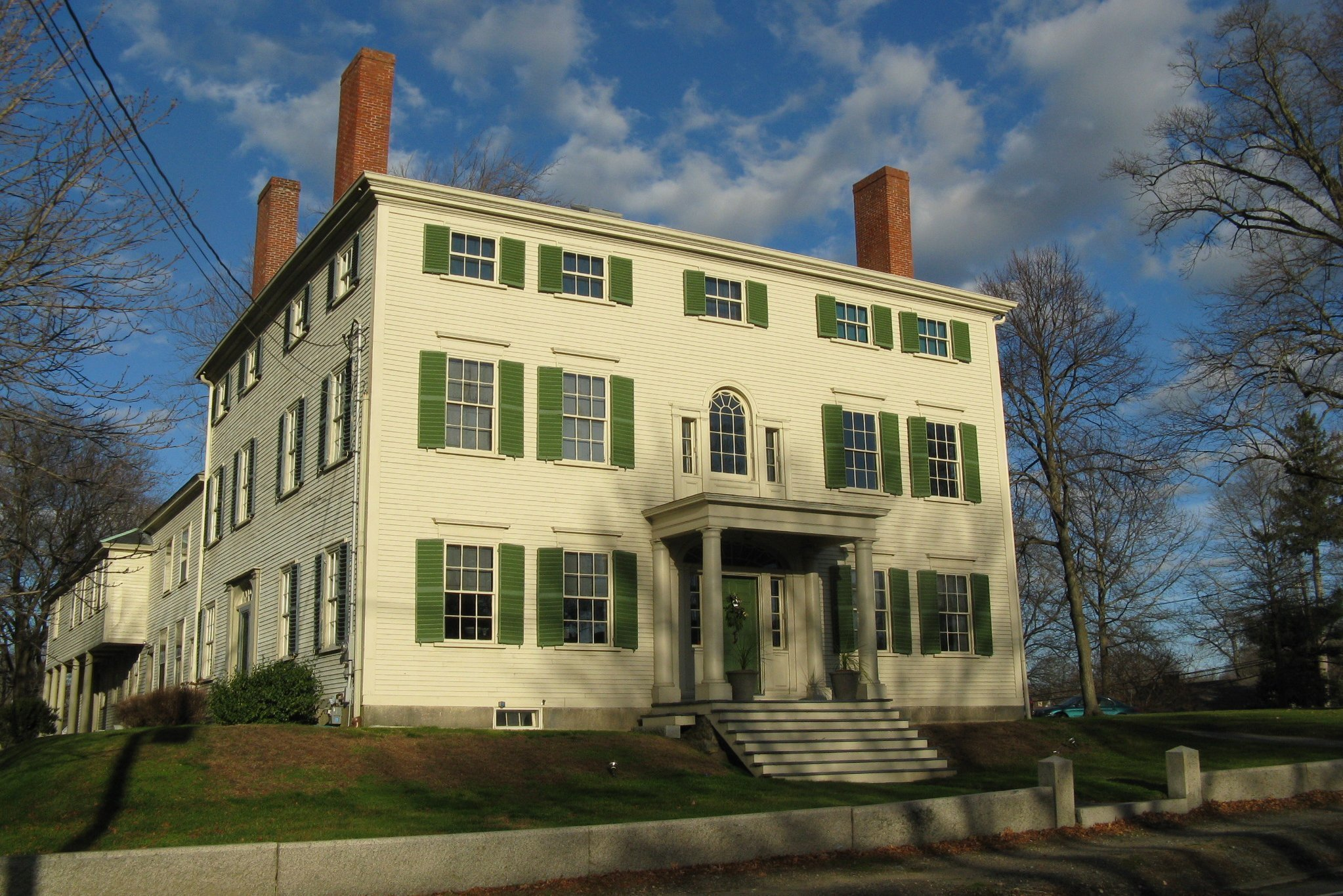
- Established: 1890
- Location: 54 South Main Street, Ipswich, MA 01938
- Website: ipswichmuseum.org

The Ipswich Museum, formerly the Ipswich Historical Society, is a museum in Ipswich, Massachusetts. It is dedicated to the preservation of Ipswich’s social, cultural, and architectural history. The museum houses the Dow Collection, the largest single-institution collection of the work of Arthur Wesley Dow.

== History ==
The Ipswich Historical Society was founded by Reverend Thomas Franklin Waters in 1890. The Society initially had no headquarters, and met in the studio of Arthur Wesley Dow. They eventually found a better place to meet in the Odd Fellows Hall. The Society's first major project was to restore the 1677 John Whipple House and make part of it their headquarters.

The Heard House (1795-1800) was sold to the IHS in 1936 by Alice Leeds Heard, also known as Elsie. It was the family residence of American entrepreneur, Augustine Heard. She sold the house under the agreement that she could live in it for the rest of her life. Upon her death in 1953 a plaque was installed in the house to commemorate her.

== Collections and programming ==
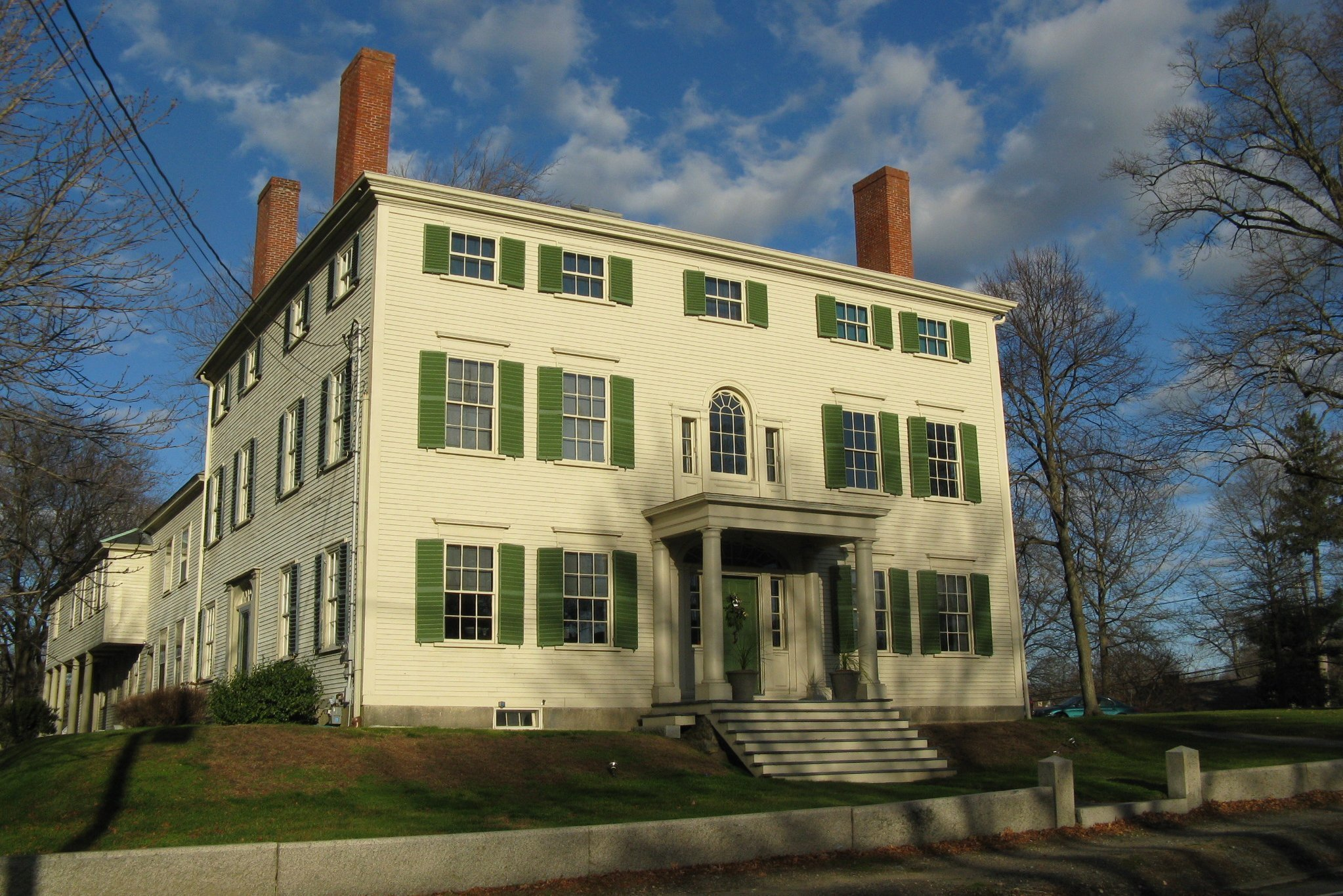
The Heard House

The museum has the largest collection of Arthur Wesley Dow in the world, as well as a Dow Curator, Stephanie Gaskins. The Dow Collection includes oil paintings, photographs, cyanotypes, woodblock prints, and an archive of historical materials.

The museum also maintains collections related to the Ipswich Female Seminary, trade with China, other artists of Ipswich, and a repository of journals, wills, deeds, manuscripts, and letters dating to 1636. It offers lectures and art classes.

In 2024, the Ipswich Museum exhibited posters, uniforms, and other pieces of American memorabilia from World War I. In 2025, the museum featured an exhibition of paintings of the North Shore by longtime Ipswich resident Francis Henry Richardson.

== See also ==
- List of historical societies in Massachusetts
