= Edward McLaughlin (gangster) =

American boxer and mobster

- Born: Edward J. McLaughlin; May 16, 1917; Boston, Massachusetts, U.S.
- Died: October 20, 1965 (aged 48); Boston, Massachusetts, U.S.
- Cause of death: Gun shots
- Other name: "Punchy"
- Occupation: Mobster
- Relatives: Bernie McLaughlin (brother)
- Allegiance: Charlestown Mob

Edward J. McLaughlin (May 16, 1917 – October 20, 1965), known as "Punchy", was an American boxer and mobster who was a member of the McLaughlin Gang from the Charlestown neighborhood of Boston.

Vincent Teresa, former mobster described Edward in his biography "My Life in the Mafia" as, "Punchy was just as crazy as George... a legbreaker for the longshoreman's union (International Longshore and Warehouse Union). Punchy was a cuckoo and as hotheaded as they came." After his brother Bernard McLaughlin was murdered in October 1961 by their former friend, "Winter Hill Gang" leader James "Buddy" McLean (Punchy and his brothers had been known to perform hits for gangs all over New England, including the Winter Hill Gang), Punchy and brother George McLaughlin murdered Russell Nicholson who was rumored to be McLean's driver in the shooting. After surviving many assassination attempts, one where he lost a hand and another where he lost half his jaw, Punchy was on his way to Boston's Suffolk Superior Courthouse for his brother Georgie's murder trial, and was shot dead at the Spring Street Metropolitan Transit Authority Loop in West Roxbury, Massachusetts.
