= Anthony Veranis =

American boxer (1938–1966)

Anthony Veranis, also known as "Mickey White" and "Tony" (June 15, 1938 – April 25, 1966), was an associate of the Winter Hill Gang and a professional welterweight boxer.

== Biography ==
=== Early life ===
Veranis was born in Dorchester, Massachusetts, to first-generation Italian immigrants. Upon their arrival to the U.S. they settled in a lower-class neighborhood in Dorchester. His father Anthony Sr. died when he was still a child leaving his mother to raise and support him on her own. By the age of twenty-seven, he had a fleeting resemblance to actor Eric Close. His mother Theresa had cried often for her troubled son Anthony during his hardships and was very close to him. He had an older brother Ralph who died on October 2, 2019. Tony had been in trouble with the law before, but had successfully made comebacks each time which pleased her.

When he was young his parents would take him to the Mechanics Hall, Worcester to watch the fights, but when Veranis started his boxing career she could not bear to see her son fight, but enjoyed hearing the crowds cheering for him. Veranis told a Boston Herald reporter several months before his gangland murder, "Boxing got me out of trouble - it does that for a lot of kids." He had "Tony" tattooed on the fingers of one of his hands and "Luck" on the other. He stood at 5'9" and weighed during his boxing career between 148 and 195 pounds and had a badly broken nose as seen in boxing photographs c. 1957 from years of boxing, fighting in prison and on the street. He was raised a Catholic. He trained with Joe DeNucci, George W. Holden, Joseph Barboza, Rocco DiSiglio, Rico Sacramone and Edward G. Connors' younger brother James.

He attended public high school in Boston and was considered by officials in the Massachusetts correctional system to be a "persistent delinquent" when he was prepubescent to the time of a teenager. As Veranis was incarcerated in 1950 at Lyman Correctional School, he was anonymously involved in the Unraveling Juvenile Delinquency (UJD) study conducted by Harvard University professors Sheldon Glueck and Eleanor (Touroff) Glueck, discovering the causes of juvenile delinquency and adult crime and assessing the overall effectiveness of correctional treatment in controlling criminal careers.

=== Boxing career ===
As a teenager he was sent to the Lyman Correction School (now the Lyman School for Boys), the United States' first reform school located in Westborough, Massachusetts. While Veranis was serving time there, boxer and fight manager Clement Stein Jr. saw him in bouts and got him enlisted in an amateur boxing league when he was released. He boxed with an orthodox stance. In 1957, at the age of eighteen he became a professional welterweight boxer. During his professional boxing career he was sponsored by the boxing equipment and sportswear company Ben Lee. Friends later said that he was quiet, polite and anxious to do well.

On December 8, 1956, he fought against Al Pepin in Portland, Maine, which was his professional boxing debut. On January 28, 1957, he impressed the audience by defeating the 150-pound boxer Gunboat Steeves in Boston, Massachusetts. On February 21, 1957, he knocked out Guy LaConte in Revere, Massachusetts. On February 27, 1957, he knocked out Don Vincent in the second round. Veranis fought against Boston native boxer Mickey Dwyer in a six-round bout in Boston, Massachusetts, and outscored him. On April 22, 1957, he knocked down Mark Murray in Holyoke, Massachusetts, three times and defeated him. On May 16, 1957, Veranis competed in his first main event against Joe Klein and won. On June 11, 1957, he knocked down competitor Norm Gautreau in Boston in 1:55. On July 25, 1957, he fought Eddie Prince and was hard pressed to win an eight-round split decision. On August 27, 1958, he fought against Gene Lopes, as a last-minute substitute in Fall River, Massachusetts, and won. He later fought Gene Lopes again on September 12, 1957, and knocked him out again in the seventh round. On November 19, 1957, he fought against Roy Tiger Steele in Boston and won. During this match, Veranis was said by boxing officials to have "avenged the only blemish on his record with an easy decision."

When boxing against Bobby Murphy on December 3, 1957, he dropped Murphy in the seventh round. Murphy rose up off the ring floor but was badly battered when referee Eddie Curley called a stop to the match. On December 17, 1957, he fought against Barry Allison, who at the time was the New England Middleweight champion. His middleweight title was not at stake though, and Veranis was disqualified. On February 13, 1958, Veranis knocked out Silby Ford for a mandatory eight count in the fifth round. He broke Ford's jaw and dislodged several teeth that sent him down. Ford was taken to Massachusetts General Hospital following Anthony's victory. On March 1, 1958, he fought for the New England Middleweight Champion title against Barry Allison whose title was up for grabs and lost. On March 17, 1958, he fought his last professional match against Joe Devlin.

== Suffering from blackouts ==
After boxing Gunboat Steeves (he had previously boxed against him on February 28, 1957) in Holyoke, Massachusetts, he started to suffer from severe headaches. He was knocked out by Joe Devlin in every round. After the fight he passed out and was taken to Boston City Hospital where he remained in a coma until June 1958. This was his last professional boxing match.

In September 1964 after returning to the ring and fighting Pineapple Stevenson, he blacked out while fighting, and woke up in the hospital again. During that match he had put Pineapple Stevenson in a coma. Anthony himself started to suffer from extremely bad migraines, nausea, blurry vision with the inability to focus, and temporary mood swings that changed his behavior. It is unknown if he sought professional rehabilitation at a hospital to help these symptoms that plagued him. He told to a friend, "I thought my life was over when I couldn't fight anymore. I was filled with self-pity, I started drinking again and I got into trouble." It is also thought that not being able to box anymore caused him severe depression which brought him to start drinking heavily and becoming incapacitated with alcohol on a regular basis.

Out of 29 matches he won 25, although never was able to obtain the welterweight championship belt as it was not available to him the first time and lost it in 1958, lost two matches and was disqualified from one.

=== Criminal career ===
He was arrested for an unidentified crime on December 23, 1963, and sent to Massachusetts Correctional Institution - Norfolk. While incarcerated at the prison was an altar boy at prison masses. Father John Fitzgerald of St. Joseph's Church in Massachusetts Correctional Institution - Norfolk later said, "He wanted to get straightened out, and I think he did. He was a wonderful boy who'd run with a bad crowd. He frequently stopped in to see me and Father Peter Hart after he got out, and everything seemed to be all right. He took me to the fights, and he was with respectable fellows." After his father suffered a heart attack and could not work, he worked on a construction crew. He became indebted to loan sharks.

=== Death and afterward ===
On April 25, 1966, a month after his release from prison John Martorano beat Anthony savagely and shot him in the head in Quincy, Massachusetts. Martorano had his corpse dumped in the Blue Hills Reservation off Route 128 in Dedham, Massachusetts.
