= Prince Street =

Street in Boston, Massachusetts

Coordinates: 42.365506°N 71.055975°W

- Black Horse Lane (formerly)
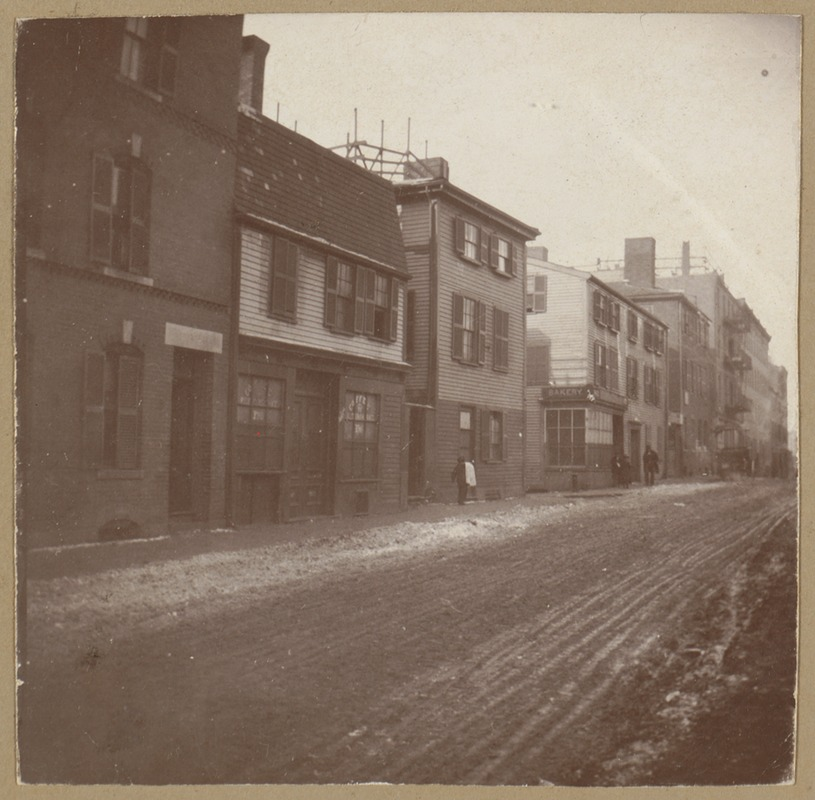
- Prince Street, near its intersection with La Fayette Avenue, pictured around 1900. Today's number 134 is on the left
- Interactive map of Prince Street
- Former name: Black Horse Lane
- Length: 0.32 mi (0.51 km)
- Location: North End, Boston, Massachusetts, U.S.
- Northwest end: Causeway Street and Commercial Street
- Southeast end: North Square and Garden Court Street

Prince Street is a street in the North End of Boston, Massachusetts, United States. It runs for around 0.32 miles (0.51 km), from Causeway Street and Commercial Street in the northwest to North Square at Garden Court Street in the southeast. It is one-way, southbound, except for the block between Hanover Street and Garden Court Street, which is northbound.

== History ==
Prince Street was originally known as Black Horse Lane. Causeway Street, meanwhile, was formerly Endicott Street. In Boston: A Guide Book with Illustrations and Maps (1903), Edward Monroe Bacon wrote that Prince Street "preserves more of the old-time aspect than other streets of the quarter."

A hospital once occupied a three-story building at the corner of La Fayette Avenue in the 19th century. It later became a bakery. The building has since been replaced.

The Boston Draft Riot of July 14, 1863, began on Prince Street.

In the 20th century, the street became notable as the headquarters of the Angiulo brothers, the leading Italian-American crime group in Boston from the 1960s until the mid-1980s. They were based at 98 Prince Street (known as the Dog House), at the corner of Thacher Street in Gaetano Iovanni Square (U.S. Army staff sergeant Iovanni, of 138 Prince Street, was killed in action during World War II). The building had a real-estate agency as a front. Giovanni and Cesare Angiulo, the brothers' parents, lived across the street at number 95. In January 1981, FBI agents placed bugs in Angiulo headquarters for over three months and listened to their discussions about murder.

== Notable addresses ==
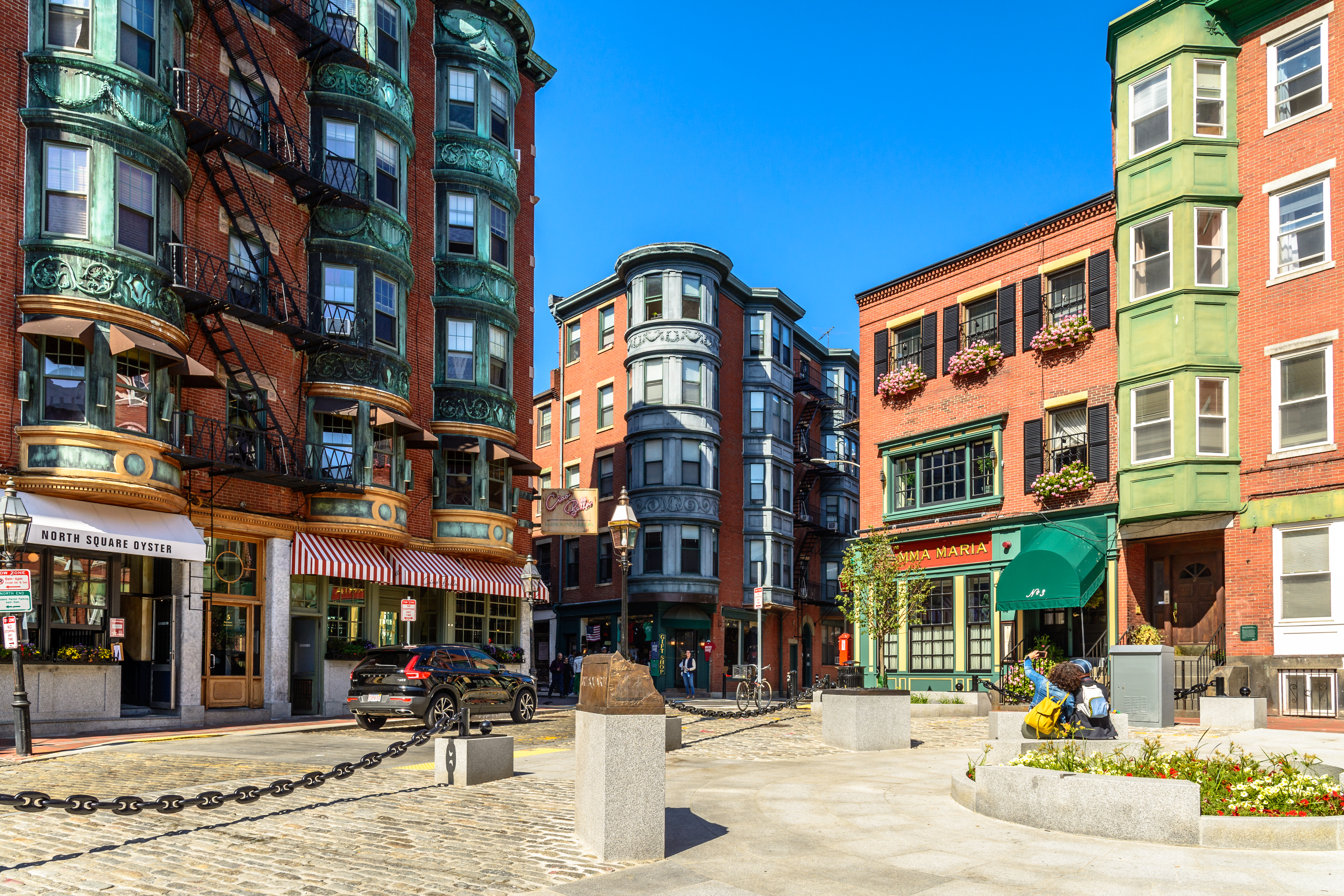
Prince Street (left of center) emerging onto North Square in 2019

- North End Historical Museum, 3 Prince Street, operated by the North End Historical Society; opened July 2026
- Thoreau House (1727), 57 Prince Street (now demolished)
- 92 Prince Street, where, in 1912, Prince Macaroni Company (later Prince Pasta) first had a store. It was established by Gaetano LaMarca, Giuseppe Seminara and Michele Cantella
- Major Pitcairn House, 130 Prince Street (demolished)
- William Gray House (1770), Prince Street and La Fayette Avenue, served as a British hospital during the Revolutionary War (demolished)

DeFilippo Playground and RUFF North End Dog Park occupy part of a triangular plot of land between Prince Street and Snow Hill Street.
