= Angiulo brothers =

American mobster

Angiulo brothers or Angiulo family
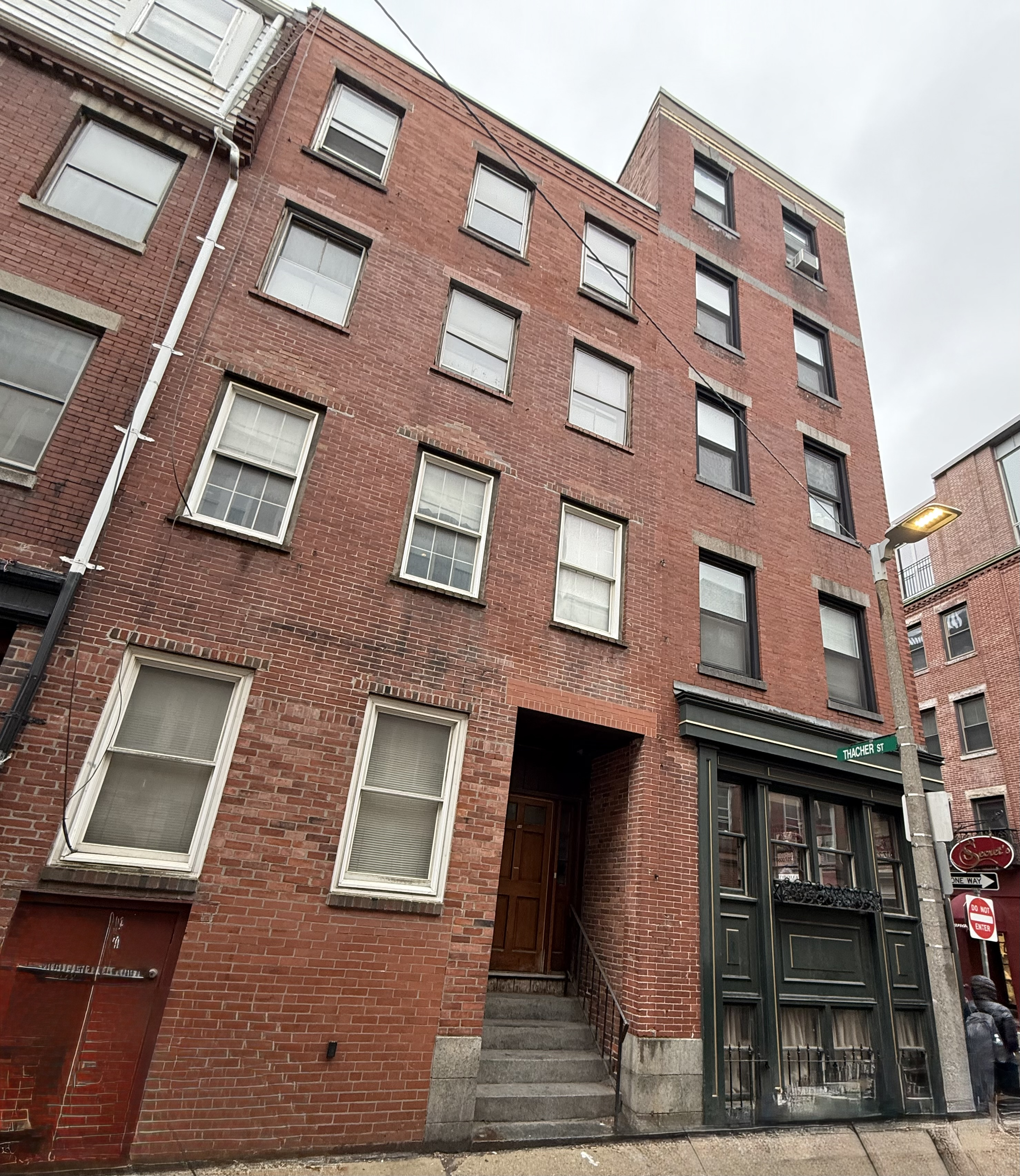
- 98 Prince Street, the Angiulos's "dog house" headquarters
- Founded by: Gennaro "Jerry" Angiulo
- Founding location: Boston, Massachusetts, U.S.
- Years active: 1960–mid 1980s
- Territory: North End, Boston, U.S.
- Ethnicity: Italian American
- Membership (est.): 7
- Activities: Murder, extortion, gambling, loan sharking, obstruction of justice
- Allies: Patriarca crime family
- Rivals: Winter Hill Gang

The Angiulo brothers or Angiulo family (Italian: [ˈandʒulo]), were the leading Italian-American crime group from Boston's North End, from the 1960s until the mid 1980s. Also, the street crew extended into East Boston, Roxbury, Waltham, Newton, Watertown, parts of Revere, and all other predominantly Italian American neighborhoods in Eastern Massachusetts. Their criminal organization was dubbed "In-Town", because one had to go in to town to visit the Angiulo Brothers.

The brothers were Antonio, Donato, Francesco, Gennaro, Michele, Nicolo, and James Angiulo. They were born in North End, to Italian immigrants Cesare and Giovannina (née Femiani) Angiulo. During the 1940s, Cesare and Giovannina Angiulo operated the "Dog House", a mom-and-pop convenience store and luncheonette at 98 Prince Street. Giovannina took over the family business when Cesare died. The "Dog House" was also the family home and became the Angiulo brothers' headquarters.

As "made men" in the Patriarca crime family, they were placed in control of the racketeering throughout Massachusetts, until Irish Mob groups such as the Winter Hill Gang and the Charlestown Mob decided to run the rackets in their own neighborhoods. During this time Winter Hill Gang members Whitey Bulger and Stephen Flemmi were informing on their Italian mob colleagues by allowing the Federal Bureau of Investigation (FBI) to bug their headquarters during the early 1980s. The "Dog House" later became an upscale pizzeria.

== Brothers ==
=== Nicolo Angiulo ===
- Vittore Nicolo "Nick" Angiulo was the oldest of his siblings, born on March 4, 1916. He grew up with younger sister, Stella Orlandella, and his brothers. He was alleged consigliere of the organization and was indicted in 1983 with his brothers Gennaro, Donato, Francesco, Donato; but he never went to trial because of illness. He died on September 13, 1987, from a kidney ailment, in St. Elizabeth's Hospital in Boston.

=== Gennaro Angiulo ===
- Gennaro Joseph "Jerry" Angiulo was born on March 20, 1919. Angiulo enlisted in the U.S. Navy at the beginning of World War II and served 4 years in the Pacific Theatre. He achieved the rank of Chief Boatswain's Mate. Upon completion of his service to the United States, he moved back to the North End of Boston. The FBI had been after him since the early 1960s. With the help of the FBI's own criminal informants James "Whitey" Bulger and Stephen "The Rifleman" Flemmi, they were able to gain a great deal of incriminating information regarding Angiulo's racketeering operations. The FBI was able to successfully plant listening devices in a bar he owned on Tremont Street. He was arrested September 19, 1983, at his North End hangout, then convicted three years later on racketeering charges. He was granted parole and was released from federal prison on September 10, 2007. He died from kidney failure at Massachusetts General Hospital on August 29, 2009.

=== Francesco Angiulo ===
- Francesco J. "Frank" Angiulo, also known as "Frankie the Cat", was born on January 13, 1921. He served in the Merchant Marines in World War II and he was personally arrested by FBI agent John Connolly in 1983. He did not marry, and was a long-time companion of Laurie Naimo. Angiulo spent 14 years in prison because of racketeering and returned home in 2000. He died on May 30, 2015, at Massachusetts General Hospital due to a heart failure.

=== Donato Angiulo ===
- Donato F. "Danny" Angiulo, also known as "Laughing Fox", was born on March 21, 1923. In 1956, he married Marguarite E. "Margo" (McMunn) Angiulo, from which he had a son, Caesar A. Angiulo and a daughter, Nina M. Angiulo Silk. He was freed from federal prison in 1997, after serving 11 years, and returned to his Medford home. He died on May 3, 2009, at Beth Israel Deaconess Medical Center after a heart failure.

=== Antonio Angiulo ===
- Antonio R. "Anco" Angiulo was born on July 4, 1925. He was the husband of Dorothy M. "Dottie" Angiulo. He died on August 4, 1976.

=== Michele Angiulo ===
- Michele A. "Mike" Angiulo was born on July 20, 1927. In 1952 he married Concetta E. "Connie" Capodilupo, and became the father of Michael J. and Joseph M. Angiulo. He served three years in prison for gambling and died on November 26, 2006.

=== James Angiulo ===
- James William Angiulo, also known as "Jimmy Jones", was born on November 28, 1939. He was married to Dorothea "Ginger" Angiulo. Together they had six children James William Angiulo Jr., Gina Angiulo, Frank Angiulo, Renee Angiulo, Christine Angiulo and Sandra Angiulo. He died on August 2, 2014, in Cape Coral, Florida, at the age of 74.

== In popular culture ==
In Black Mass (2015), Gennaro Angiulo is portrayed by Bill Haims and Michele Angiulo is mentioned by John Connolly, portrayed by Joel Edgerton, when he says "I saw Mikey Angiulo, Bobby Carrozza, and one Vincent 'The Animal' Ferrara all go inside".
