= Charlestown Gang =

Organized crime group

- Founded: c. 1950s
- Founders: Bernard "Bernie" McLaughlin
- Founding location: Boston, Massachusetts, United States
- Years active: c. 1950s–1966
- Territory: Charlestown
- Ethnicity: Predominantly Irish American
- Activities: Racketeering, gambling, loan sharking, extortion, armed robbery, theft, murder
- Allies: Genovese crime family; Patriarca crime family
- Rivals: Winter Hill Gang

The Charlestown Gang, also known as the McLaughlin Gang, was an Irish American organized crime gang based in the Charlestown neighborhood of Boston, Massachusetts. The gang was headed by the McLaughlin brothers Bernie, Georgie, and Edward "Punchy" McLaughlin, along with their primary enforcers, the brothers Stevie and Cornelius "Connie" Hughes. The gang's associates included Will Delaney, Harry Hannon, William Bennett, Edward Bennett, John Shackelford, Frank Murray, Leo Lowry, Ron Dermody and Joe "Rockball" O'Rourke.

The Charlestown Gang became involved in a gang war with a rival Irish mob group, the Winter Hill Gang of Somerville led by James "Buddy" McLean, beginning in 1961. By 1966, two of the McLaughlin brothers, Bernie and "Punchy", had been killed, while the other, Georgie, was sentenced to life in prison for murder. The Hughes brothers suffered almost identical fates, as they were both shot to death on separate occasions.

== History ==
The Irish American McLaughlin siblings from the Charlestown neighborhood of Boston originally consisted of five brothers, two of whom were killed in World War II. The remaining brothers were Edward "Punchy" McLaughlin, a prize fighter and enforcer; Bernard "Bernie" McLaughlin, a gang leader and organizer; and George "Georgie" McLaughlin, a psychopathic and violent alcoholic. The McLaughlin brothers had a reputation as a treacherous, ruthless, and murderous gang. The brothers controlled gambling and loan sharking on the docks around the Boston Navy Yard in Charlestown.

The McLaughlin brothers forged ties with the Mafia, carrying out contract killings for the Patriarca crime family in Boston and the Genovese crime family in New York City. In the late 1950s, the brothers aligned themselves with New York gangsters in an attempt to take control of waterfront rackets in Boston, but the move was successfully resisted by an alliance of hoodlums from Somerville and South Boston. A truce followed, during which the McLaughlin brothers and their partners, the brothers Stevie and Cornelius "Connie" Hughes, would regularly drink with gangsters from the neighboring suburb of Somerville, including James "Buddy" McLean and Joseph "Joe Mac" McDonald, at the Celtic Tavern in Charlestown.

=== The Charlestown–Somerville War ===
During a party at Salisbury Beach on Labor Day weekend 1961, Georgie McLaughlin made an advance on the girlfriend of Alexander "Bobo" Petricone, a member of the Somerville Winter Hill Gang. McLaughlin was subsequently beaten unconscious by Somerville gangsters and dumped outside Anna Jaques Hospital in Newburyport. Bernie McLaughlin then visited Winter Hill Gang leader McLean at his headquarters, the Tap Royal Bar in the Winter Hill neighborhood of Somerville, and demanded that he hand over the members of the gang who beat his brother, which McLean refused to do.

In the early hours of October 30, 1961, Bernie and Georgie McLaughlin and another unidentified man were planting a car bomb on the undercarriage of McLean's automobile, which was parked outside his home, when the sleeping McLean was awakened by his barking dog. McLean chased off the three Charlestown gangsters by firing at them with a Luger pistol, and found five sticks of dynamite attached to his car. The following afternoon, McLean and two accomplices tracked down Bernie McLaughlin as he collected loan sharking debts and shot him dead in front of over a hundred witnesses outside the Morning Glory Café in Charlestown's City Square.

In early 1962, the McLaughlin Gang bombed the unoccupied car of Petricone's wife, prompting him to flee Boston. Afterwards, there was a lull in hostilities between the Charlestown and Winter Hill gangs as McLean was sentenced to two years in prison. Although he was arrested for McLaughlin's murder, the charge was dismissed when witnesses refused to testify, and he was convicted of weapons offenses.

The corrupt Federal Bureau of Investigation (FBI) agent H. Paul Rico aligned with the Charlestown Mob's Somerville rivals after he heard Georgie and "Punchy" McLaughlin make disparaging remarks on an illegal wiretap. The McLaughlins accused Rico of having a homosexual threesome with his bosses, J. Edgar Hoover and Clyde Tolson, and referred to the FBI men as "fags". "Punchy" McLaughlin also threatened the brother of Dennis Condon, Rico's FBI partner. Rico began leaking information to the Winter Hill Gang which allowed them to track down members of the McLaughlin Gang.

At a christening party in Boston's Roxbury neighborhood on March 15, 1964, Georgie McLaughlin was involved in a drunken argument with another partygoer who had spoken fondly of McLean. McLaughlin returned to the party after leaving to retrieve a gun, and fatally shot another man, bank teller William "Billy" Sheriden, in error.

On May 3, 1964, Charlestown Mob member Frank Benjamin was shot in the head and killed by the brothers Vincent "Jimmy the Bear" Flemmi and Stephen "the Rifleman" Flemmi, who were loyal to the Winter Hill Gang, at a bar owned by Stephen Flemmi after he had threatened to kill McLean and other Somerville gangsters. Because the gun used to kill Benjamin belonged to a corrupt Boston police officer, the Flemmi brothers decapitated Benjamin to avoid being identified by ballistic tests run on the bullet in Benjamin's head. Benjamin's decapitated body was found in the trunk of a stolen car in South Boston, while the Flemmi brothers had his head buried in the woods.

The Winter Hill Gang made their first attempt on the life of "Punchy" McLaughlin on November 23, 1964, shotgunning him as he entered his car outside the Beaconsfield Hotel in Brookline. Despite having half his jaw blown off, McLaughlin survived after he was rushed to Boston's Beth Israel Hospital. The Roxbury gangster Earl Smith arranged a meeting with McLaughlin in a parking garage at the hospital. McLaughlin was then ambushed by two Winter Hill gunmen, Stephen Flemmi and Francis "Cadillac Frank" Salemme, disguised as rabbis. He again survived his wounds.

Wanted for the murder of Sheriden, Georgie McLaughlin was added to the FBI Ten Most Wanted Fugitives list. After the FBI located the fugitive gangster hiding out in the Dorchester neighborhood of Boston, Rico obtained a "throwdown" revolver from Stephen Flemmi, which he planned to plant on McLaughlin after shooting him during his arrest. Rico abandoned the plan, however, due to concerns that another FBI agent may not assent to the killing, and McLaughlin was captured without incident on February 24, 1965. He was convicted of Sheriden's murder and sentenced to life in prison at Bay State Correctional Center in Norfolk.

On August 16, 1965, the third murder attempt was made on "Punchy" McLaughlin when Somerville gunmen ambushed him as he arrived in his car at his girlfriend's house in Westwood. Although Howard "Howie" Winter blew McLaughlin's right hand off using a scoped Winchester rifle, McLaughlin escaped following a car chase along Route 128.

"Punchy" McLaughlin was killed on the fourth attempt, shot seven times as he boarded a bus on October 20, 1965.

In November 1965, McLaughlin Gang associate John "Maxie" Shackleford survived a shooting in Charlestown. He subsequently fled the Boston area.

John Locke, a minor member of the McLaughlin Gang and one of the few remaining Charlestown gangsters, was found shot to death after being thrown onto a snowbank in the parking lot of Wonderland station in Revere in March 1967.

== Former members and associates ==
- Frank "Frankie" Benjamin – Benjamin was shot and killed by Vincent Flemmi and Stephen Flemmi of the Winter Hill Gang at Stephen Flemmi's bar on May 3, 1964. He was then decapitated, and his body was left in the trunk of a car in South Boston. His severed head was buried.
- Bernard Dermody – Dermody came from a criminal family in Cambridge, of which both his father and brother died in prison. He was a member of a bank-robbing gang led by James "Whitey" Bulger and later joined the McLaughlin Gang after he was released from federal prison amidst the Irish Gang War. In an attempt to kill Winter Hill Gang leader James "Buddy" McLean, Dermody accidentally shot the wrong man. He then contacted FBI agent H. Paul Rico, who arranged for a meeting in Watertown on the night of September 4, 1964. Unbeknownst to Dermody, the corrupt agent Rico was in league with the Winter Hill Gang. After being alerted to Dermody's location by Rico, McLean arrived and shot Dermody dead in his parked car.
- John Locke – Locke was a minor member of the McLaughlin Gang. One of the few remaining members, he was found dead, shot in the head and chest, and thrown onto a snowbank in the parking lot of Wonderland station in Revere in March 1967.
- George Patrick "Georgie" McLaughlin – Georgie McLaughlin was the youngest of the McLaughlin brothers. He was added to the FBI Ten Most Wanted Fugitives list after shooting and killing bank clerk William Sheridan during a party in Roxbury on March 15, 1964. On February 24, 1965, McLaughlin was arrested at a Dorchester apartment, where he had been living under the alias "John T. O'Connor". He was convicted of first-degree murder on October 26, 1965, and sentenced to life imprisonment.
- Joseph "Rockball" O'Rourke – O'Rourke was a minor Charlestown hoodlum and associate of the McLaughlin Gang. He was a rival of the Dorchester gangster James "Spike" O'Toole.
- John "Maxie" Shackleford – Shackleford was a longshoreman and McLaughlin Gang associate. He survived a shooting in Charlestown in November 1965. Shackleford fled Boston for New Hampshire in 1965.

== See also ==
- Killeen Gang
- Mullen Gang
