= Louis Litif =

American bookmaker (1934-1980)

- Litif's September 25, 1979 mugshot
- Born: Louis R. Lataif-Litif; December 5, 1934; Somerville, Massachusetts, U.S.
- Died: April 12, 1980 (aged 45); Boston, Massachusetts, U.S.
- Cause of death: Gunshots
- Other names: "Disco Louie"; "Little Louis"
- Occupations: Bookmaker; drug dealer
- Spouse: Anna Duggan
- Children: 2

Louis R. Litif (December 5, 1934 – April 12, 1980), also known as Nicholas Noonan and Louis Woodward, was an American bookmaker from South Boston, Massachusetts. After running afoul of neighborhood Irish Mob boss Whitey Bulger, Litif was murdered by the Winter Hill Gang in 1980. His body was left in a car trunk in Boston's South End. The murder remained unsolved for decades.

== Family background ==
Latif was born "Louis R. Lataif-Litif" and carried the nicknames "Little Louis" and "Disco Louie". He was the son of Francophone Lebanese parents who were immigrants from what was then known as the Lebanese Republic. Latif's last name was shortened and Americanized upon his parents' arrival in America. Louis' parents emigrated from Lebanon in 1934 after France took over the colony. They settled in Somerville, Massachusetts, where Litif was born. Litif was born and raised in the same South End-Roxbury neighborhood that had spawned Patriarca crime family captain Ilario Zannino, Stephen Flemmi, and Vincent Flemmi. As a teenager, Litif set up gambling rackets.

== Criminal career ==
During the 1950s, Litif married an Irish American woman named Anna (nee Duggan) They had two children, a daughter and a son. Litif made himself a fixture on the handball courts at the L Street Bathhouse, playing all comers for $25 or $50 a game. His reputation as an earner made him popular with South Boston's criminal elite, and at one point police believed he was essentially running the neighborhood gambling rackets, taking in as much as $20,000 a week.

In the late 1960s and early 1970s, Litif was considered, in official circles, to be one of the top bookmakers in South Boston. He was one of the few prominent Lebanese Americans active in Boston's criminal underworld other than the brothers.

Before 1976, when he began associating with the Winter Hill Gang, little is known about Litif, except that he was the leader of a large-scale sports gambling operation. Partnered with a fellow bookie known as "Joe the Barber," the operation was one of the biggest moneymakers for neighborhood boss Donald Killeen and his successors.

According to former South Boston mob informant Kevin Weeks, who was then the bouncer in the Triple O's saloon,

He wasn't a big guy, maybe five seven and 185 pounds, of Arab descent. He had a wife and a couple of kids, and a three decker townhouse on East Broadway and H. I was friendly with his daughter Luanne, who was a few years younger than me. That night, as always, he was talking in his obnoxious loud voice. Even when there were 400 people in the bar, you always knew Louie was there.

Litif became more violent, beginning in the late 1970s. In 1975, he was arrested and convicted for pistol whipping an individual with a .357 Magnum which he carried in the waistband of his pants and pulled out whenever he had the urge.

Eventually, Boston newspapers reported that Litif was suspected of shooting a man named Lip Mongelio six times after an argument, in the alley outside Hap's Lounge, the bar Litif co-owned with fellow bookmaker, James Matera. The doctors at Boston City Hospital were able to save Litif's alleged victim. According to Weeks, Litif had never shot anyone before and began walking toward the police station, intending to turn himself in. However, he was intercepted by Bulger, who calmed him down and drove him home. It was alleged Bulger sent an associate of his to convince Mongelio to not press charges against Litif.

According to Weeks,

Then Jimmy sent Alan Thistle... to talk to Lip in the hospital. Thistle persuaded Lip not to testify against Louie and everything was dropped. After all, Louie was also a good moneymaker. No reason to send a profitable bookmaker away for attempted murder. A few days later, however, Louie decided he wanted to kill Alan Thistle for no other reason than he just didn't like him. But Jimmy told him he couldn't. "He just talked the kid out of pressing charges against you and now you want to kill him?" Jimmy said, "He did you a favor." And that was the end of that.

== The murders of Matera and Conrad ==
According to Kevin Weeks Litif began stealing from his partners in the bookmaking operation and using the money to traffic cocaine. To the fury of Bulger, Litif refused to pay a cut of the profits. Litif also became addicted to the drugs he was selling.

According to Weeks,

But a month or so later, Louie made things more complicated again when he got into an argument during another cardgame, this time with his partner, Jimmy Matera. Matera caught Louie cheating and slapped him in the face during the game. About a week later, they were having problems at the bar with an outrageous water bill, and Louie convinced Matera that there must be something wrong with the water meter. When the two of them went into the cellar, Louie told Jimmy to look at the water meter, which he said was broken. While Matera was staring at the meter, Louie shot him in the head for slapping him.

Unfortunately, for Litif, bartender Robert Conrad was working that night and witnessed the crime. Shortly thereafter, Conrad disappeared. According to Kevin Weeks,

Conrad, who was about fifty, was a nervous wreck over what he had seen, so Louie wined and dined him in Las Vegas. Then he took him up to a little place he had in Nova Scotia, where he promised to hide him until everything blew over, assuring him that everything would be alright and that there was nothing to worry about. He killed him there, took him to the back of the house in a wheelbarrow, and buried him. He ended up hiding him so well that thanks to the law in Canada limiting their access to search for bodies, the DEA and the State Police couldn't find him.

As Robert Conrad's daughter later recalled in court, when she went to the FBI searching for answers about her father's disappearance, John Connolly told her bluntly what had happened. "Honey," he said, "Your father's dead. They knifed him. But don't worry. They got him drunk first." She later recalled herself asking him in a 2001 newspaper account, "I saw it", he said. John Connolly told her that if she went to the Boston police, it might jeopardize some very important informants in the Boston underworld. The daughter's problem was that her family badly needed the money from her father's life insurance policy, but couldn't collect the money without a death certificate. John Connolly straightened everything out with a single letter to the insurance company on FBI stationery. Two decades later, the Conrad family was able to produce a letter from the carrier stating that the missing persons case had been resolved thanks to the efforts of, "Agent Connolly."

== Litif's murder ==
According to Kevin Weeks, Bulger was infuriated that Litif had been committing murders without his permission. Litif also began arguing with "Joe the Barber," his partner from the bookmaking operation. One week before his murder, Litif entered South Boston's Triple O's saloon and told an outraged Bulger that he was also going to kill Joe, whom he accused of stealing money from the bookmaking operation. Bulger refused to sanction this, but Litif continued to insist. Seething with hatred, Bulger informed Litif that he had, "stepped over the line," and was, "no longer just a bookmaker."

At the time Kevin Weeks was about to marry his longtime girlfriend. A short time before the wedding, Weeks informed Bulger that he was having difficulty seating Louis Litif. "Don't worry about it," Bulger responded. "He probably won't show."

According to Weeks,

Personally, I liked Louie. Every Sunday night, he'd come down to Triple O's and we'd play cards or pinball, twenty bucks a game. He was loud but funny, and he'd always been a major moneymaker for Jimmy. He should have just stayed a bookie and not tried to jump from the minor leagues to the majors. And now he wanted to kill a friend of Jimmy. There was no way that would be allowed. Shortly after that, a week or so before my wedding, Louie was found stuffed into a garbage bag in the trunk of his car, which had been dumped in the South End. He'd been stabbed with an ice pick and shot. 'He was color coordinated,' Jimmy told me. 'He was wearing green underwear and was in a green garbage bag.' At the wedding, when I went around to greet his table, Jimmy pointed to the empty chair beside him and said, 'Say hi to Louie.' Stevie picked up a napkin and made a show of wiping his face. 'He keeps on drinking and it keeps on leaking out of him,' he said, reminding us that Louie had been shot in the head and any drink he might have put in his mouth would pour right out of his face. And they all broke out laughing.

== Aftermath ==
In 1982, South Boston drug dealer Edward Brian Halloran approached the FBI and claimed to have witnessed the murder of Louis Litif. He stated that he had dropped Litif off that night and watched Bulger and Flemmi stab and shoot the bookie to death.

According to Kevin Weeks,

Strangley enough, Jimmy, told me, 'Louie's last words to me were a lie.' Apparently, Louie had insisted that he'd come by himself and that nobody had driven him over. It was hard to figure out why Louie lied to Jimmy that night. If he'd told Jimmy that someone had driven him, he might have gotten a pass. But it wouldn't have lasted long, since Jimmy had no intention of letting Louie run wild.

The FBI, however, eventually decided that Halloran was an unreliable witness. After being refused a place in the Witness Protection Program, he made the mistake of returning to South Boston. There, Halloran was ambushed on the waterfront and machine gunned to death by Bulger, Flemmi, Kevin Weeks, and a fourth man whom Weeks refuses to name. Stephen Flemmi has alleged that the fourth assassin was South Boston mobster Patrick Nee. Nee denies the allegation.

A week or so after Litif's death, Boston Herald reporter Paul Corsetti began researching an article about the murder and Bulger's suspected involvement in it. After several days of reporting the story, he was approached by a man who told him, "I'm Jim Bulger and if you continue to write shit about me, I'm going to blow your fucking head off." Corsetti attempted to seek out help from the Patriarca crime family, but was informed that Bulger was outside their control.

According to Kevin Weeks,

The next day, Corsetti reported the meeting to the Boston police. He was issued a pistol permit within twenty-four hours. The cop who gave him the permit told him, "I'm glad my last name is not Corsetti.' A couple days later, Jimmy told me about the scene with the cop and was glad to hear how uncomfortable he'd made Corsetti.
