= Whitey Bulger =

American gangster and crime boss (1929–2018)

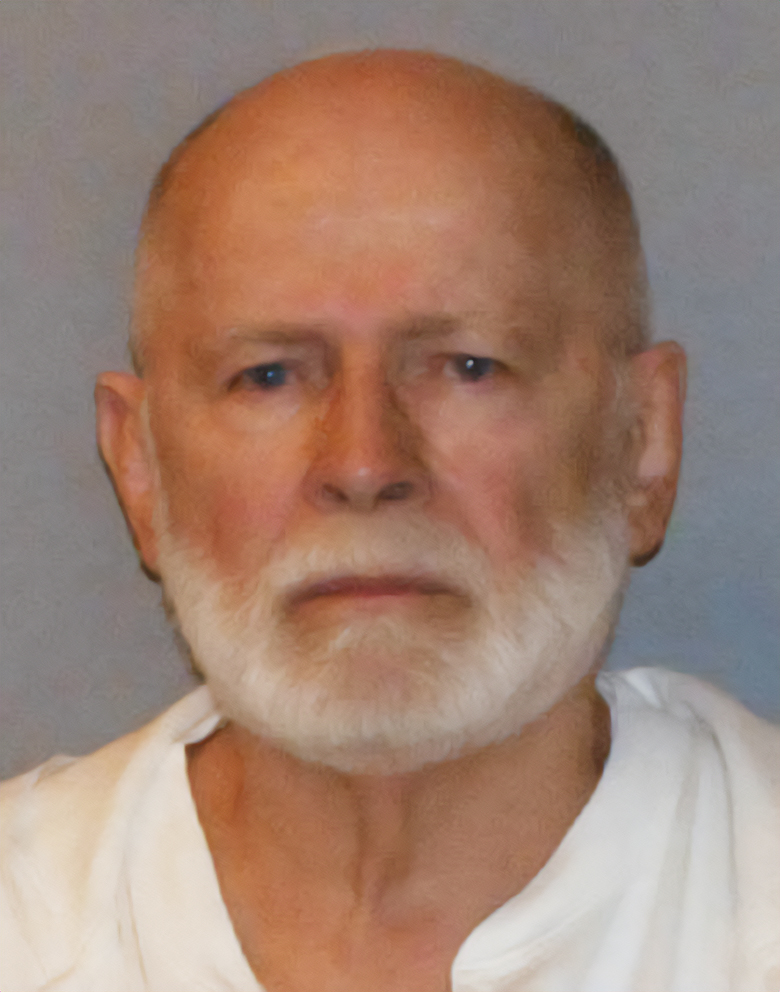
- Bulger in 2011

FBI Ten Most Wanted Fugitive
- Charges: Racketeering (RICO); Murder (19 counts); Conspiracy to commit murder; Extortion; Conspiracy to commit extortion; Narcotics distribution; Conspiracy to commit money laundering
- Alias: Jimmy Bulger; Thomas F. Baxter; Mark Shapeton; Tom Harris; Tom Marshall; Ernest E. Beaudreau; Harold W. Evers; Robert William Hanson

Description
- Born: James Joseph Bulger Jr. September 3, 1929; Everett, Massachusetts, U.S.
- Died: October 30, 2018 (aged 89); Preston County, West Virginia, U.S.
- Cause of death: Blunt force trauma
- Siblings: William Bulger; John P. Bulger
- Children: 1

Status
- Penalty: Two life sentences plus five years, forfeiture of $25.2 million, $19.8 million restitution
- Added: August 19, 1999
- Caught: June 22, 2011
- Number: 458
- Captured

James Joseph "Whitey" Bulger Jr. (/ˈbʌldʒər/; September 3, 1929 – October 30, 2018) was an American organized crime boss who led the Winter Hill Gang, an Irish mob group based in the Winter Hill neighborhood of Somerville, Massachusetts, northwest of Boston. On December 23, 1994, Bulger went into hiding after his former FBI handler, John Connolly, tipped him off about a pending RICO indictment against him. He remained at large for sixteen years. After his 2011 capture, federal prosecutors tried Bulger for nineteen murders based on grand jury testimony from Kevin Weeks and other former criminal associates.

Although he adamantly denied it, the FBI stated that Bulger had served as an informant for several years starting in 1975, providing information about the inner workings of the Patriarca crime family, his Italian-American Mafia rivals based in Boston and Providence, Rhode Island. In return, Connolly, as Bulger's FBI handler, ensured that the Winter Hill Gang was effectively ignored. Beginning in 1997, press reports exposed various instances of criminal misconduct by federal, state and local officials with ties to Bulger, causing embarrassment to several government agencies, especially the FBI.

Five years after his flight from the Boston area, Bulger was added to the FBI's Ten Most Wanted Fugitives list; he was considered the most wanted person on the list behind Osama bin Laden. Another twelve years passed before he was apprehended along with his longtime girlfriend, Catherine Greig, outside an apartment complex in Santa Monica, California. Bulger and Greig were extradited to Boston and taken to court under heavy guard. In June 2012, Greig pleaded guilty to conspiracy to harbor a fugitive, identity fraud and conspiracy to commit identity fraud, receiving a sentence of eight years in prison. Bulger declined to seek bail and remained in custody.

Bulger's trial began in June 2013. He was tried on thirty-two counts of racketeering, money laundering, extortion and weapons charges, including complicity in nineteen murders. On August 12, Bulger was found guilty on thirty-one counts, including both racketeering charges, and was found to have been involved in eleven murders. On November 14, he was sentenced to two consecutive life sentences plus five years by U.S. District Court Judge Denise J. Casper. Bulger was incarcerated at the United States Penitentiary Coleman II in Sumterville, Florida.

Bulger was transferred to several facilities in October 2018: first to the Federal Transfer Center in Oklahoma and then to the United States Penitentiary, Hazelton, near Bruceton Mills, West Virginia. Bulger, who was in a wheelchair, was beaten to death by inmates on October 30, 2018, within hours of his arrival at Hazelton. In 2022, Fotios Geas, Paul DeCologero and Sean McKinnon were charged with conspiracy to commit first-degree murder in Bulger's death.

== Early life ==
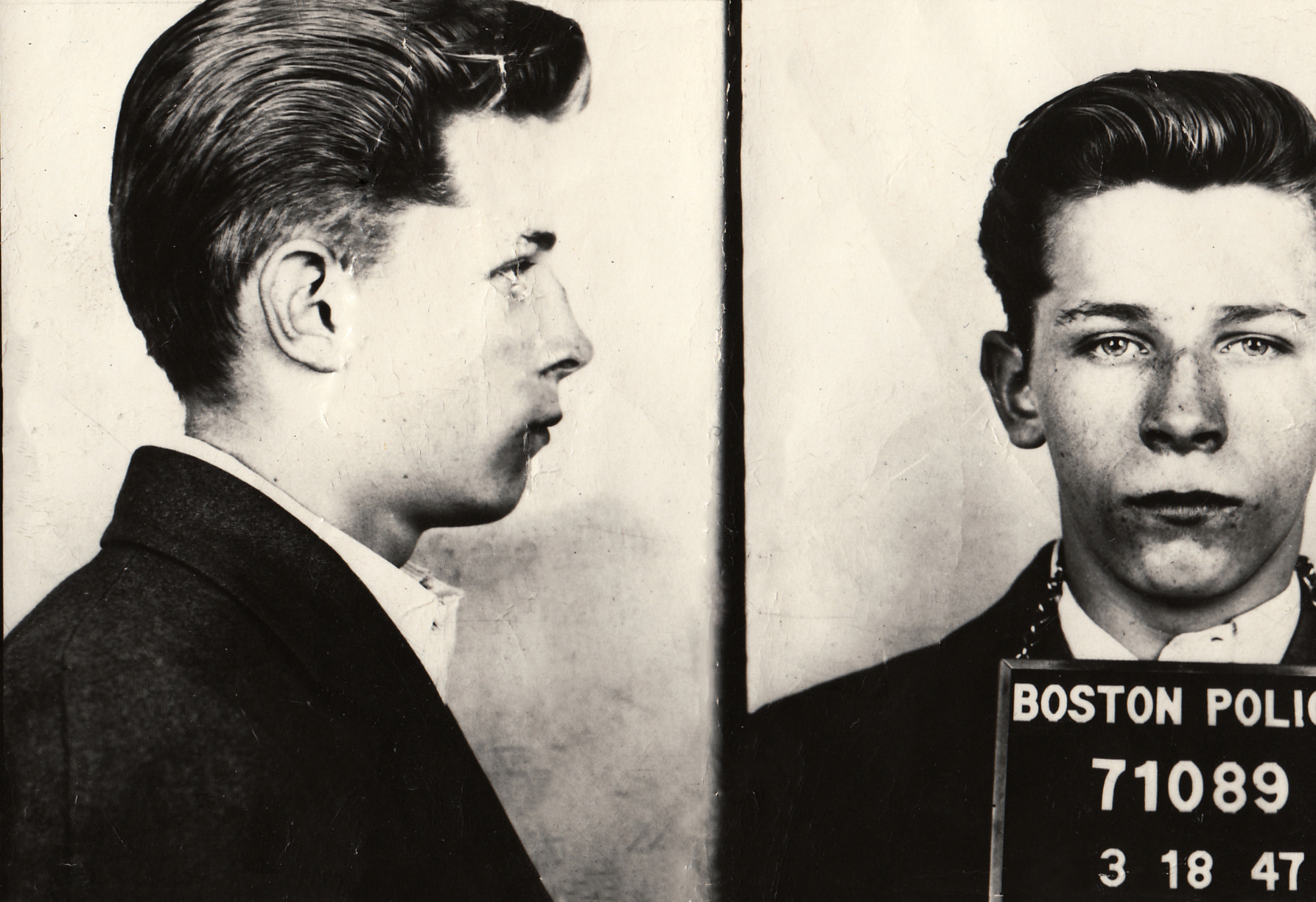
17-year-old Bulger in a 1947 mugshot

Whitey Bulger's father, James Joseph Bulger Sr., hailed from Harbour Grace, Newfoundland, the son of Irish parents. After settling in Everett, Massachusetts, he married Jane Veronica "Jean" McCarthy, a first-generation Irish immigrant. The second of six children, James Joseph Bulger Jr., was born on September 3, 1929. The family moved to Boston shortly after his birth.

Bulger's father worked as a union laborer and occasional longshoreman. The family fell into poverty after he lost his arm in an industrial accident. In May 1938, the Mary Ellen McCormack Housing Project was opened in South Boston, an insular, working-class Irish American neighborhood. The Bulger family moved into the housing project and the children grew up there. While his younger siblings, William Bulger and John P. Bulger, excelled at school, James Bulger Jr. was drawn into street life.

Early in his criminal career, local police gave Bulger the nickname "Whitey" because of his blond hair. The nickname stuck, even though Bulger hated it; to his closest friends, he was known as "Jim", "Jimmy" or even "Boots". The last nickname came from his habit of wearing cowboy boots, in which he used to hide a switchblade.

== Early criminal career ==
Bulger developed a reputation as a thief and street fighter fiercely loyal to South Boston. This led to him meeting more experienced criminals and finding more lucrative opportunities. In 1943, fourteen-year-old Bulger was arrested and charged with larceny. By then he had joined a street gang known as the "Shamrocks" and would eventually be arrested for assault, forgery and armed robbery. Bulger was sentenced to a juvenile reformatory for these offenses.

Shortly after his release in April 1948, Bulger joined the United States Air Force, where he earned his high school diploma and trained as a mechanic. Despite the regimented military life, he had not reformed. Bulger did time in military prison for several assaults and was arrested by Air Force police in 1950 for going absent without leave. In June 1951, while stationed at Malmstrom Air Force Base in Great Falls, Montana, he was arrested and charged with rape after being caught in a hotel with a fifteen-year-old girl. He had also been arrested several months prior after getting into bar fights. Nevertheless, Bulger received an honorable discharge in 1952 and returned to Massachusetts.

=== Prison ===
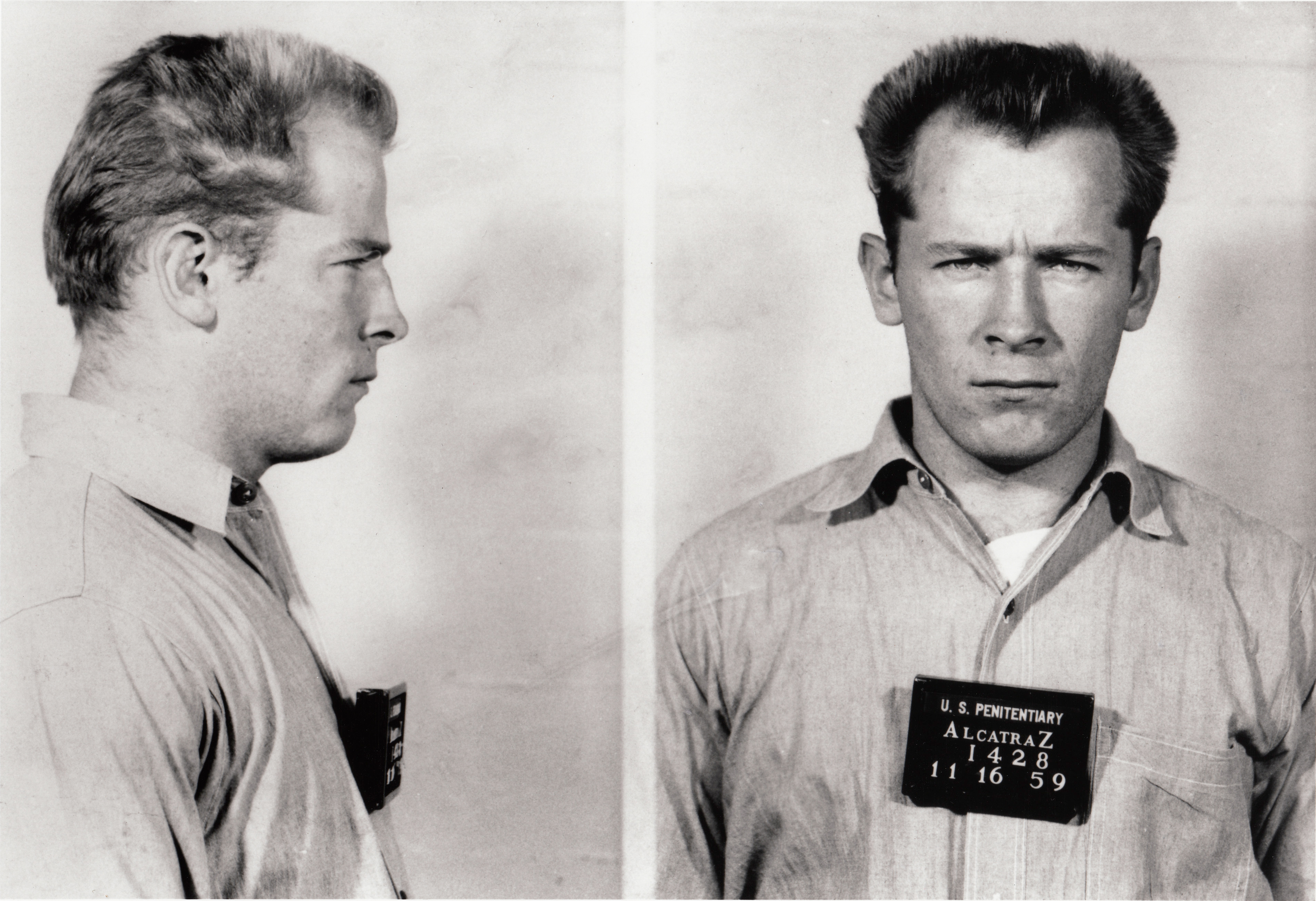
Bulger's 1959 mugshot at Alcatraz, age 30

In 1956, Bulger served his first term in federal prison at Atlanta Penitentiary for armed robbery and truck hijacking. He later told mobster Kevin Weeks that while there, he was used as a human test subject in the CIA-sponsored MKUltra program. Bulger later complained that the inmates had been "recruited by deception" and were told they were helping to find "a cure for schizophrenia", when in fact they were being used for research into mind control. His story was later confirmed when CIA documentation emerged.

Bulger and eighteen other inmates, all of whom had volunteered in exchange for reduced sentences, were given LSD and other drugs over an eighteen-month period. Bulger later described his experience as "nightmarish" and said it took him "to the depths of insanity", writing in his notebooks that he heard voices and feared being "committed for life" if he divulged his ordeal to anyone.

In 1959, Bulger was briefly transferred to maximum security at Alcatraz Federal Penitentiary in San Francisco Bay, California. During his time at Alcatraz, Bulger kept in shape through weightlifting and took advantage of educational opportunities afforded to inmates. He completed correspondence courses including typing, bookkeeping and business law. He also became a voracious reader, devouring numerous books on poetry, politics and military history. Later in his sentence, Bulger was transferred to Leavenworth Federal Penitentiary and, in 1963, to Lewisburg Federal Penitentiary. Bulger's third petition for parole, in 1965, was granted after he had served nine years in prison. He was not arrested again for forty-six years.

=== Killeen–Mullen War ===
After his release from prison, Bulger worked as a janitor and construction worker before becoming a bookmaker and loan shark under mobster Donald Killeen, whose gang, the Killeens, had dominated South Boston for over twenty years. The Killeens were led by three brothers—Donnie, Kenny and Eddie—along with Billy O'Sullivan and Jack Curran. Their base was the Transit Café in South Boston, which later became Whitey's Triple O's.

In 1971, Kenny Killeen, the youngest of the Killeen brothers, allegedly shot and mauled Michael "Mickey" Dwyer, a member of the rival Mullen Gang, during a brawl at the Transit Café. A gang war resulted, leading to a string of killings throughout Boston and the surrounding suburbs. The Killeens quickly found themselves outgunned and outmaneuvered by the younger Mullens. It was during the war that Bulger set out to commit what Weeks later alleged was his first murder, of Mullen member Paul McGonagle. However, Bulger instead executed McGonagle's law-abiding brother Donald in a case of mistaken identity.

Although [McGonagle] never did anything, he kept on stirring everything up with his mouth. So Jimmy decided to kill him. ... Jimmy shot him right between the eyes. Only ... it wasn't Paulie. It was Donald. ... Jimmy drove straight to his mentor Billy O'Sullivan's house on Savin Hill Avenue and told O'Sullivan ... 'I shot the wrong one. I shot Donald.' Billy ... said, 'Don't worry about it. He wasn't healthy anyway. He smoked. He would have gotten lung cancer.'

According to former Mullen boss Patrick Nee, McGonagle ambushed and murdered O'Sullivan on the assumption that he was the one responsible for his brother's killing. Bulger, realizing he was on the losing side, is alleged to have secretly approached Howie Winter, the leader of the Winter Hill Gang, and claimed he could end the war by murdering the Killeen leadership. Shortly thereafter, on May 13, 1972, Donnie Killeen was gunned down outside his home in Framingham, Massachusetts. Although the killing was attributed to Bulger, Nee later disputed this, saying that Donnie was murdered by Mullen enforcers James Mantville and Tommy King, not Bulger.

Bulger and the Killeens fled Boston, fearing they would be next. Nee arranged for the war to be mediated by Winter and Joseph "J.R." Russo, a caporegime (captain) in the Patriarca crime family. In a sit-down at Chandler's nightclub in Boston's South End, the Mullens were represented by Nee and King, and the Killeens by Bulger. The two gangs joined forces, with Winter as overall boss. Soon afterward, the surviving Killeen brother, Kenny, was jogging in the City Point section of South Boston when Bulger called him over to a car and told him, "It's over. You're out of business. No more warnings." Kenny later testified that Winter Hill enforcers Stephen Flemmi and John Martorano were in the car with Bulger.

=== Winter Hill Gang ===
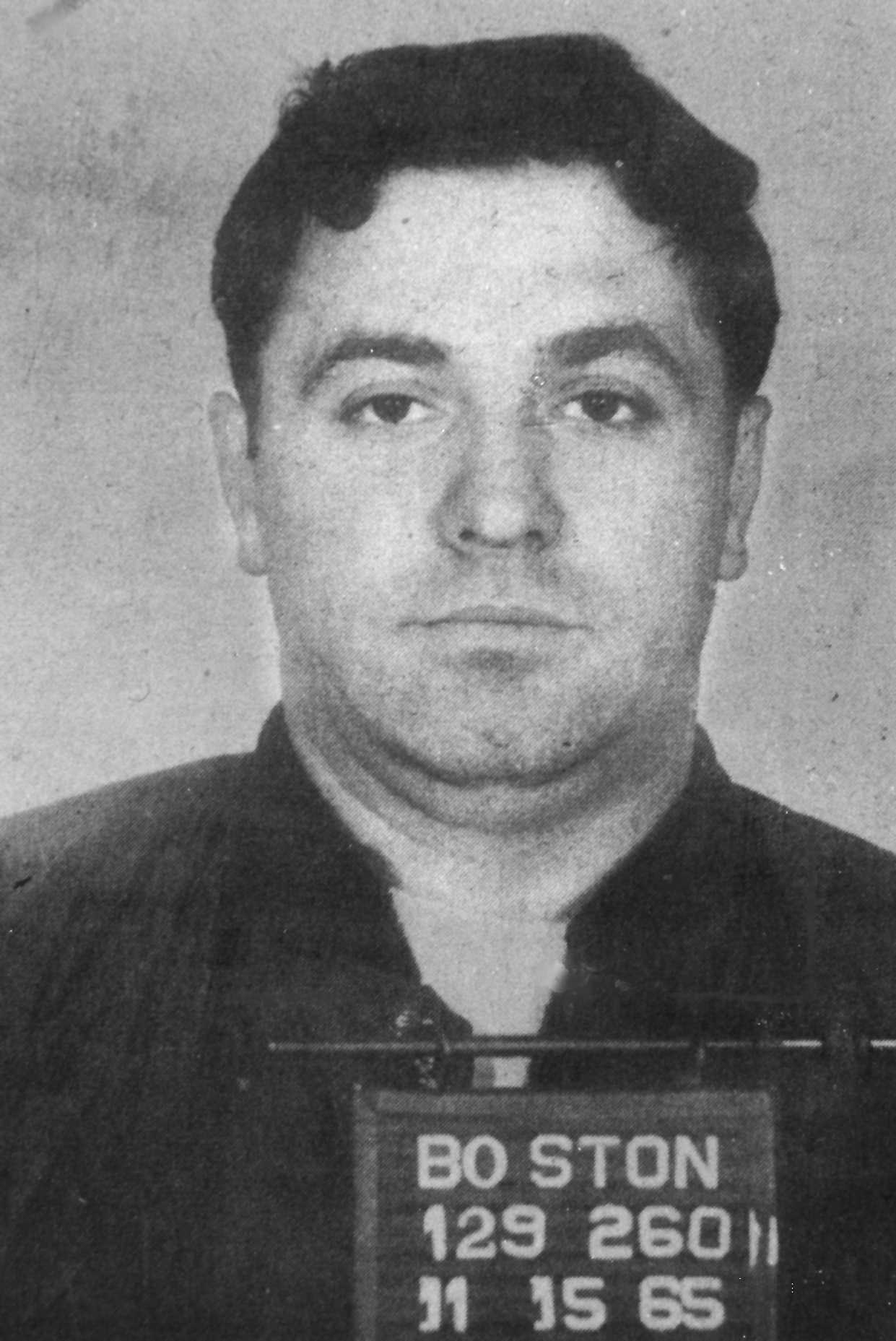
Bulger's partner in crime, Stephen Flemmi

After the 1972 truce, Bulger and the Mullens were in control of South Boston's criminal underworld. FBI Special Agent Dennis Condon noted in his log in September 1973 that Bulger and Nee had been heavily shaking down the neighborhood's bookmakers and loan sharks. Over the years that followed, Bulger began to remove opposition by persuading Winter to sanction the killings of those who "stepped out of line." In a 2004 interview, Winter recalled that the highly intelligent Bulger "could teach the devil tricks." During this era, Bulger's victims included Mullen veterans McGonagle, King and James "Spike" O'Toole.

According to Weeks:

As a criminal, he made a point of only preying upon criminals... And when things couldn't be worked out to his satisfaction with these people, after all the other options had been explored, he wouldn't hesitate to use violence. ... Tommy King, in 1975, was one example. ... Tommy's problems began when he and Jimmy had worked in Triple O's. Tommy, who was a Mullins, made a fist. And Jimmy saw it. ... A week later, Tommy was dead. Tommy's second and last mistake had been getting into the car with Jimmy, Stevie, and Johnny Martorano. ... Later that same night, Jimmy killed Buddy Leonard and left him in Tommy's car on Pilsudski Way in the Old Colony projects to confuse the authorities.

In 1974, Bulger formed a partnership with Flemmi as enforcers for the Winter Hill Gang. As the 1970s progressed, the gang partnered with Anthony "Fat Tony" Ciulla in a lucrative horse race-fixing scheme, in which mobsters bribed and threatened jockeys and drugged horses in order to predetermine the outcomes of races across the East Coast. Bulger and Flemmi's role in the scheme involved placing bets with bookmakers around the country.

=== Anti-busing attacks ===
In late August or early September 1974, Bulger and an accomplice reportedly set fire to an elementary school in Wellesley to intimidate U.S. District Court Judge Wendell Arthur Garrity Jr. over his mandated plan to desegregate schools in the city of Boston by means of busing. One year later, on September 8, 1975, Bulger and an unidentified person tossed a Molotov cocktail into the John F. Kennedy birthplace in Brookline in retaliation for Senator Ted Kennedy's vocal support for Boston school desegregation. Bulger then used black spray paint to scrawl "Bus Teddy" on the sidewalk outside of the national historic site.

== FBI informant ==
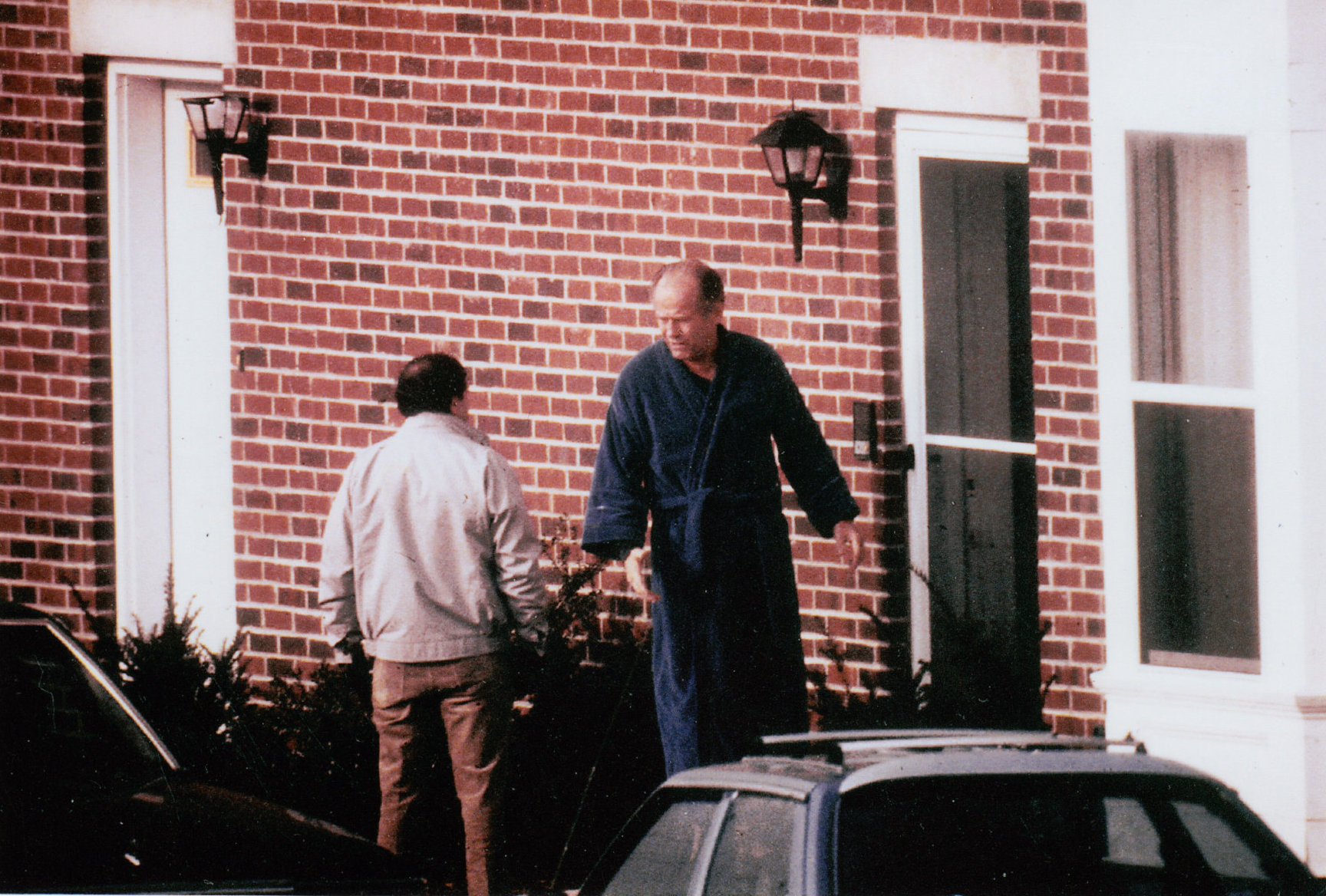
An FBI surveillance photograph of Bulger with Stephen Flemmi, c. 1980

In 1971, the Federal Bureau of Investigation (FBI) approached Bulger and attempted to recruit him as an informant in an ongoing effort to gain information on the Patriarca crime family. FBI Special Agent John Connolly, who like Bulger had grown up in South Boston, was assigned to make the pitch. However, Connolly failed to win Bulger's trust. Three years later, Bulger partnered with Flemmi, unaware that he had been an informant for the FBI since the beginning of his criminal career in 1965.

Although it is a documented fact that Bulger soon followed Flemmi's example, exactly how and why continues to be debated. Connolly frequently boasted to his fellow agents about how he had recruited Bulger during a late-night meeting at Wollaston Beach while the two sat in Connolly's agency car. Connolly allegedly told Bulger that the FBI could help in his feud with influential Patriarca underboss Gennaro "Jerry" Angiulo. After listening to the pitch, Bulger is said to have responded, "Alright, if they want to play checkers, we'll play chess. Fuck 'em." According to Connolly, Bulger told him, "I will not be called an informant. I will be your strategist."

Weeks considers it more likely that Flemmi had betrayed Bulger to the FBI after being threatened with the loss of his informant status. In 1997, shortly after The Boston Globe disclosed that Bulger and Flemmi had been informants, Weeks met with Connolly, who showed him a photocopy of Bulger's file. In order to explain why both men had chosen to work with the FBI, Connolly said, "The Mafia was going against Jimmy and Stevie, so Jimmy and Stevie went against them."

According to Weeks:

...Connolly kept telling me that 90 percent of the information in the files came from Stevie. ... But, Connolly told me, he had to put Jimmy's name on the files to keep his file active. As long as Jimmy was an active informant, Connolly said, he could justify meeting with Jimmy and giving him valuable information. Even after he retired, Connolly still had friends in the FBI, and he and Jimmy kept meeting to let each other know what was going on. ...I could see that a lot of the reports were not just against the Italians. There were more and more names of Polish and Irish guys, of people we had done business with, of friends of mine. ... I would see, over and over again, that some of these people had been arrested for crimes that were mentioned in these reports. ...it had been bullshit when Connolly told me that the files hadn't been disseminated, that they had been for his own personal use. ... If there was some investigation going on and his supervisor said, 'Let me take a look at that,' what was Connolly going to do? He had to give it up. And he obviously had.

Although, according to Connolly, Bulger dictated from the outset of his cooperation that he would only inform on the Mafia, he also provided information on his own associates in the Winter Hill Gang, including Winter, Martorano, Joseph "Joe Mac" McDonald, Jimmy Sims and even his fellow informant Flemmi. In fact, Bulger was able to provide far more valuable information on his own organization than he was on the Patriarca family.

In the 1970s and 1980s, the Organized Crime Program of the FBI regarded the Mafia as a greater threat than all other organized crime groups in the United States combined and targeted them as a national priority. The Boston field office of the FBI perceived the Winter Hill Gang to be significantly less dangerous than the Patriarca family, particularly after several Winter Hill members were imprisoned or became fugitives as a result of a horse race-fixing case in 1979.

FBI supervisor John Morris was put in charge of the Organized Crime Squad at the Boston field office in December 1977. Morris not only proved himself unable to rein in Connolly's protection of Bulger, he even began assisting him. Under pressure from superiors to cultivate informants who could be used against the Mafia, Connolly and Morris portrayed Bulger and Flemmi as invaluable sources in order to advance their careers. In reality, however, Bulger and Flemmi were far less valuable as sources than their handlers purported them to be. In a 2011 interview, Flemmi recalled, "Me and Whitey gave [the FBI] shit, and they gave us gold."

In addition to protecting the Winter Hill Gang from prosecution, Connolly and Morris accepted bribes from Bulger and Flemmi during their frequent meetings. By 1982, Morris was "thoroughly compromised" to the point of having Bulger purchase plane tickets for his then-girlfriend, Debbie Noseworthy, to visit him in Georgia while he was being trained for drug investigations. Even after 1983, when Morris was transferred to head up the Boston FBI's anti-drug task force, he remained an accomplice to Bulger and Connolly.

In the summer of 1983, tensions between the Winter Hill Gang and the Patriarca family escalated to an all-time high. An employee for Coin-O-Matic, a Patriarca-owned vending machine company that laundered money for the family, was kidnapped on the job. The Boston Police Department (BPD), acting on a tip, raided a butcher shop in South Boston co-owned by Bulger and two other Winter Hill members. Police found the victim hanging from a beef rack, having been severely tortured and held for more than six days.

The victim never testified, and all law enforcement documents were redacted of his full name; law enforcement gave him the name "Butch". Law enforcement had hoped he would cooperate fully and then go into witness protection. People familiar with Coin-O-Matic knew exactly who the employee was, but the neighborhood code of silence was still very strong in South Boston. Over the next few months, three low-level Winter Hill Gang members were executed. This was believed to be primarily in retribution for the kidnapping. The conflict shone a large spotlight on Morris's incompetent management and triggered an internal investigation within the FBI.

In 1988, Bulger's status as an FBI informant was revealed publicly when the Globe's "Spotlight" team, led by journalist Gerard O'Neill, published a series of articles detailing the numerous crimes committed and attributed to Bulger while nominally under the protection of the Bureau. Rumors had abounded long before then, since it was unheard of for a criminal of Bulger's stature to go years without a single arrest. Prompted by his guilty conscience, Morris, speaking as an anonymous source, told the Globe of the "special relationship" between Bulger and the FBI which helped the Bureau infiltrate the Patriarca family. Bulger denied that there was any truth to the articles, telling his underlings that the Globe had fabricated the story. Given his street credibility, Bulger's gang dismissed the articles as false.

== Consolidating power ==
In February 1979, federal prosecutors indicted twenty-one members of the Winter Hill Gang, including Winter and numerous members of his inner circle, for fixing horse races. Bulger and Flemmi were originally going to be part of this indictment, but Connolly and Morris were able to persuade prosecutor Jeremiah T. O'Sullivan to drop the charges against them at the last minute. Bulger and Flemmi were instead named as unindicted co-conspirators. They stepped into the resulting power vacuum and took over the leadership of the gang, transferring its headquarters to the Lancaster Street Garage in Boston's West End, near the Boston Garden.

By January 1980, the FBI were aware of Bulger's headquarters at the garage but failed to investigate or inform other law enforcement agencies of the Winter Hill Gang's presence there. The Massachusetts State Police (MSP) discovered the location by chance while investigating an auto theft ring, finding that Bulger and Flemmi would openly associate with other organized crime figures, including Donato "Danny" Angiulo, Vincent "the Animal" Ferrara and Ilario "Larry" Zannino, at the garage. The MSP subsequently targeted Bulger and Flemmi in an investigation into illegal gambling and loan sharking.

Between March and July 1980, MSP troopers carried out surveillance from an adjacent flophouse before being granted a warrant to install covert listening devices on the premises in the summer of 1980. The electronic eavesdropping gathered no evidence, as Connolly alerted Bulger and Flemmi that troopers had bugged the garage. The gang ceased using the garage for a time after learning that the meeting place was compromised.

The MSP resumed surveillance on Bulger and Flemmi in September 1980, frequently following the pair to a bank of payphones outside a Howard Johnson's restaurant in Dorchester. Troopers were again granted a warrant to bug the payphones. Immediately after the bug was planted, the gangsters abruptly stopped using the payphones. The MSP became suspicious that Bulger had been tipped off about their investigation but were unsure of how or by whom. In November 1980, troopers learned that Morris had errantly told a BPD detective at a bachelor party that he was aware of the MSP investigation, and that Bulger and his gang knew that the garage was bugged, effectively exposing the FBI as the source of the leak. The MSP investigation ended unsuccessfully in March 1981.

After Bulger and Flemmi took over the remnants of the Winter Hill Gang, they used their status as informants to eliminate competition. The information they supplied to the FBI in subsequent years was responsible for the imprisonment of several of Bulger's associates whom he viewed as threats. No criminal organization suffered worse than the Patriarca family, which was based in Boston's North End and in the Federal Hill neighborhood of Providence, Rhode Island.

In November 1980, Bulger and Flemmi helped the FBI plant a microphone in the headquarters of Jerry Angiulo on Prince Street in the North End as part of a RICO case being assembled against the Patriarca family. Although Bulger and Flemmi were just two of nine informants used by the FBI to obtain court approval to plant the device, Connolly and Morris exaggerated their role in the investigation in reports to their superiors in order to insulate themselves from complaints by senior officials in the MSP accusing the FBI of corruption in its handling of the duo.

The bug gathered enough evidence to bring down the leadership of the Mafia in Boston. After the 1983 federal racketeering indictments of Angiulo and his associates, the Patriarca family's Boston operations were in shambles. Bulger and Flemmi stepped into the ensuing vacuum to take control of organized crime in the Boston area.

=== The murder of Louis Litif ===
In 1980, Bulger was approached in Triple O's by Louis Litif, a local Lebanese-American bookmaker. Weeks, a bouncer at the bar, later recalled: "He wasn't a big guy, maybe five seven and 185 pounds. Of Arab descent, he had a mustache like Saddam Hussein. ... That night, as always, he was talking in his obnoxious loud voice. Even when there were 400 people in the bar, you always knew Louie was there."

Litif had stolen money from his partners in the bookmaking operation and used the money to traffic cocaine, refusing to pay Bulger a cut of his drug profits and committing two murders without Bulger's permission. Litif told an outraged Bulger he was also going to kill his partner, "Joe the Barber," whom he accused of also stealing from the bookmaking operation. Bulger refused to sanction this murder, but Litif vowed to proceed. Bulger replied, "You've stepped over the line. You're no longer just a bookmaker." Litif responded that, as Bulger was his friend, he had nothing to worry about. Bulger coldly responded, "We're not friends anymore, Louie."

Weeks, who was about to get married, informed Bulger shortly before the wedding that he was having difficulty finding a seat for Litif at the reception. "Don't worry about it," Bulger responded. "He probably won't show." Approximately one week before the wedding, Litif's body was found in the South End, stuffed inside a garbage bag in the trunk of his car. He had been stabbed with an ice pick and shot.

According to Weeks,

Strangely enough, Jimmy, told me, 'Louie's last words to me were a lie.' Apparently, Louie had insisted that he'd come by himself and that nobody had driven him over. It was hard to figure out why Louie lied to Jimmy that night. If he'd told Jimmy that someone had driven him, he might have gotten a pass. But it wouldn't have lasted long, since Jimmy had no intention of letting Louie run wild.

=== Halloran and Donahue murders ===
In 1982, Edward Brian Halloran, a South Boston cocaine dealer known as "Balloonhead" because of his large cranium, approached the FBI and stated that he had witnessed Bulger and Flemmi murdering Litif. Connolly kept Bulger and Flemmi closely briefed on what Halloran was saying, specifically his claims of having participated in the murder of Tulsa businessman Roger Wheeler (which were false according to Weeks). Connolly reported that Halloran was shopping this information to the FBI in exchange for him and his family being placed in witness protection.

On May 11, 1982, a criminal associate named John Hurley visited the Winter Hill Gang's appliance store and mentioned to Bulger, Flemmi and Weeks that he had seen Halloran in a bar on Northern Avenue. After arriving at the scene, Weeks staked out the Anthony's Pier 4 restaurant, where Halloran was dining. Michael Donahue, a friend of Halloran, incidentally ran into him at the restaurant. In a decision that would prove costly, Donahue offered Halloran a ride home.

As Donahue and Halloran drove out of the parking lot in a blue Datsun, Weeks signaled Bulger by stating, "The balloon is in the air" over a walkie-talkie. Bulger then pulled alongside the Datsun in a 1975 Chevrolet Malibu with an accomplice armed with a silenced MAC-10 submachine gun; Bulger himself carried a .30 carbine rifle. Both gunmen were disguised; Bulger with an Afro wig and a fake moustache, and the accomplice in a ski mask. In the disguise, Bulger apparently resembled Jimmy Flynn, a Winter Hill associate with whom Halloran had been feuding.

After Bulger shouted to Halloran, both gunmen opened fire and sprayed the Datsun with bullets. Donahue was shot in the head and killed instantly. The accomplice's firearm allegedly jammed after the initial volley of shots. As Halloran stumbled out of the car in an attempt to flee, Bulger performed a U-turn and continued shooting Halloran until his body was "bouncing off the ground," according to Weeks.

Although he was shot approximately twenty times, Halloran lived long enough to incorrectly identify his attacker as Flynn, who was subsequently tried and acquitted. Halloran later died in the hospital from blood loss. Flynn remained the prime suspect in the shooting until 1999, when Weeks agreed to cooperate with investigators and identified Bulger as one of the gunmen. Flemmi has identified the second shooter as Nee, who denies the allegation and has never been charged.

Shortly after the shootings, Bulger and Weeks returned to the scene to recover one of the Malibu's hub caps while police were still present. The following day, Bulger, Weeks and Flemmi—the latter of whom expressed his disappointment that he hadn't taken part in the killings—inspected the bullet-riddled Datsun at a tow lot. Bulger instructed Weeks to dispose of the weapons used in the killings by throwing them into Marine Bay.

Donahue was survived by his wife and three sons. The families of Donahue and Halloran eventually filed a civil lawsuit against the U.S. government after learning that Connolly had informed Bulger of Halloran's informant status. Both families were awarded several million dollars in damages. However, the verdict was overturned on appeal due to the late filing of the claims. Thomas Donahue, who was eight years old when his father was murdered, has become a spokesman for the families of those allegedly murdered by the Winter Hill Gang.

== Peak years ==
Throughout the 1980s, Bulger, Flemmi and Weeks operated rackets throughout Eastern Massachusetts including loansharking, bookmaking, truck hijacking, arms trafficking and extortion. State and federal agencies were repeatedly stymied in their attempts to build cases against Bulger and his inner circle. Among the reasons for this was the trio's fear of wiretaps and their strict protocol of never discussing business over the telephone or in vehicles. Other reasons included South Boston's code of silence and corruption within the FBI, the MSP and the BPD. Although Connolly was Bulger's most infamous source inside law enforcement, Weeks has stated that MSP lieutenant Richard J. Schneiderhan, the crew's only source inside that agency, was valued more highly.

Bulger formed alliances with members of the Patriarca family who had escaped the conviction that sent the Angiulo brothers to prison. Francis "Cadillac Frank" Salemme, who succeeded Jerry Angiulo as leader of the Boston faction of the family, began working with the Winter Hill Gang following his release from prison in 1988.

In 1984, Bulger acquired Stippo's Liquor Mart adjacent to the Old Colony Housing Project by forcing the proprietor, Stephen "Stippo" Rakes, to sell him the business at gunpoint for $67,000. Bulger renamed the business the South Boston Liquor Mart and used the backroom as his gang's primary headquarters. He also forced local bars to buy alcohol from this business.

=== World Jai Alai ===
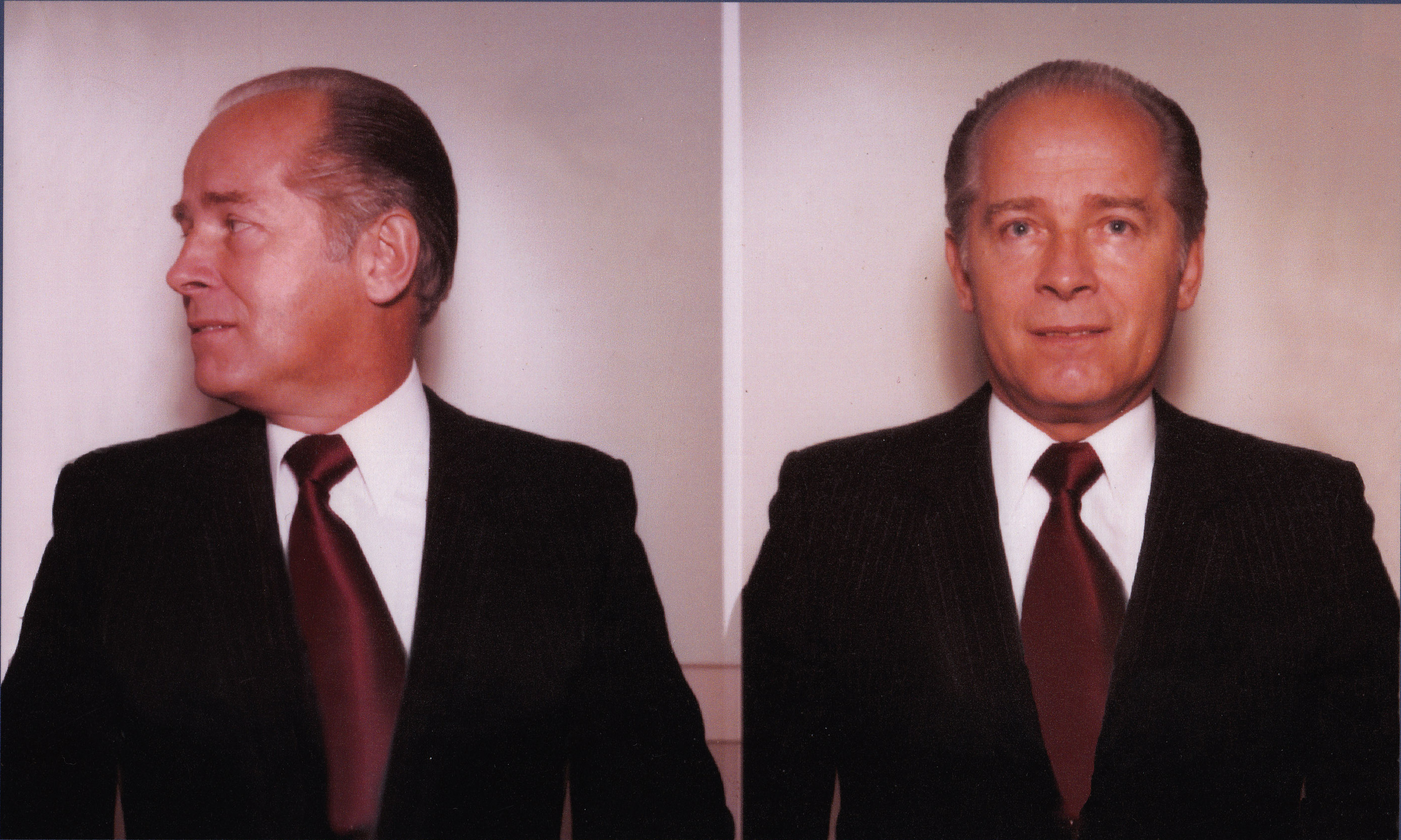
Bulger's December 1983 mugshot

Winter Hill associate John "Jack" Callahan was fired from his role as president of World Jai Alai (WJA), a parimutuel betting company which operated in Connecticut and Florida, after he lost his gaming license in Connecticut due to his associations with organized crime. Callahan subsequently conspired with former FBI agent H. Paul Rico, who had served as Callahan's head of security at WJA, and Richard P. Donovan, another former WJA president, to regain control of the company by purchasing the business from its owner, Tulsa businessman Roger Wheeler. Callahan offered Bulger, Flemmi and Martorano a $10,000 per week "skim" from the parking and concession proceeds at WJA's fronton in Hartford, Connecticut, if the Winter Hill Gang would protect WJA against interference by the Mafia, to which the gangsters agreed. Wheeler refused to sell WJA to Callahan and his associates, who agreed that Wheeler had to be killed.

In January 1981, Halloran was summoned to a meeting with Bulger, Flemmi and Callahan at which he was asked to kill Wheeler, although Halloran declined. Days later, Callahan paid Halloran $20,000 to remain silent about the planned murder. In March, Wheeler sold the Hartford fronton amid questions by gaming officials about his partners' ties to organized crime. Fearing that Wheeler was on the verge of reporting the skimming operation to authorities, Bulger ordered his murder. On May 27, a disguised Martorano, using guns shipped by bus from Bulger and Flemmi, killed Wheeler by shooting him in the face in the parking lot of the Southern Hills Country Club in Tulsa.

After Connolly told Bulger in July 1982 that the FBI wanted to question Callahan in connection with Wheeler's murder, he and Flemmi decided to kill Callahan. On August 1, Martorano lured Callahan into a car and shot him in the head during a meeting at Fort Lauderdale International Airport. With the assistance of Joe McDonald, Martorano left the body in the trunk of Callahan's leased Cadillac in a garage at Miami International Airport. The body was discovered on August 3 when a parking attendant noticed blood dripping from the trunk of the car. To give the appearance that Callahan had been killed by "bad Cubans" in a drug-related murder, Bulger told Martorano and McDonald to leave some of Callahan's personal papers in a Cuban bar in Little Havana. Allowing Callahan's body to be discovered went against Bulger's plans, however, leading him to complain about Martorano: "There's plenty of sand down there. He should have got off his fat ass and buried him!"

Following Callahan's death, the Winter Hill Gang learned that he had secret bank accounts in Switzerland worth up to $600,000. Michael Solimando, Callahan's business partner, was summoned to Triple O's and told by Bulger that he was now responsible for a fictitious debt that Callahan had purportedly owed him. Bulger threatened Solimando, a bodybuilder, with a replica Thompson submachine gun and said: "Your muscles aren't going to do you any good now." After flying to Switzerland and emptying Callahan's accounts, Solimando delivered $480,000 to the Winter Hill Gang, which was divided among Bulger's crew in shares of $60,000.

At the request of Oklahoma and Florida authorities investigating the murders of Wheeler and Callahan, Bulger and Flemmi were interviewed by two Boston FBI agents, Gerald Montanari and Brendan Cleary, on November 2, 1983. The interview was arranged by Connolly and conducted in the backroom of a South Boston club owned by Bulger. Bulger and Flemmi only agreed to be interviewed under the condition that they were interviewed together, and both refused to take a polygraph test. Bulger told the agents that, although he and Flemmi would not usually agree to meet with law enforcement agents about any crime, they had agreed to the meeting because Wheeler was a "legitimate guy" and they wanted to refute the allegations against them. Bulger and Flemmi were photographed in December 1983 after being subpoenaed by a federal grand jury. They wore suits for the photographs on the instruction of Connolly, who told them wearing suits rather than street clothes would make them look more like businessmen and less like criminals. When the photographs were shown to eyewitnesses in the Wheeler murder, neither man was identified. The investigation into the murders ultimately wound down in 1985 with no indictments.

=== Extortion of drug dealers ===
Although Bulger cultivated a reputation as a Robin Hood-type figure who protected South Boston from outsiders and kept the neighborhood free of narcotics, he made "a ton of money selling drugs," according to federal prosecutor Brian Kelly. Bulger became involved in drug trafficking in 1981, but upheld a pretence that he did not partake in such activity. While he profited from the distribution of marijuana and cocaine, Bulger prohibited dealers from selling heroin in South Boston.

During the mid-1980s, Bulger began summoning Boston-area drug dealers to his headquarters. Flanked by Weeks and Flemmi, he would inform each dealer that he had been offered a substantial sum in return for that dealer's assassination, demanding a large cash payment in exchange for not killing them. Bulger required all drug traffickers in South Boston to pay tribute to the Winter Hill Gang, and he and Flemmi often obtained a share of profits from drug shipments brought into the South Boston piers. However, the massive profits of drug trafficking eventually proved irresistible, and Bulger became actively involved in importing cocaine into Boston from Florida.

Bulger utilized his contacts in the FBI to help him take control of Boston's drug trade. In April 1983, he learned that Charlestown drug smuggler Joseph "Joe" Murray was importing marijuana into South Boston without the approval of the Winter Hill Gang and, in retaliation, tipped off Connolly about Murray's operations. Murray and six others were arrested when the FBI and the Drug Enforcement Administration (DEA) seized fifteen tons of marijuana from a South Boston warehouse. Afterwards, Murray commenced monthly payments to Bulger for the privilege of warehousing his contraband in South Boston and for protection from the Winter Hill Gang. When Murray later retired from drug trafficking, Bulger demanded a $500,000 "severance package" from him.

Although Bulger profited from the drug trade, he and Flemmi denied to their FBI handlers that they were involved in the business. Connolly strongly defended his informants from FBI superiors against any such allegations. In the spring of 1983, the DEA, the MSP, the Quincy Police Department and the United States Attorney's office in Boston launched Operation Beans, a sophisticated investigation into Bulger and Flemmi's drug operations. Connolly learned of the investigation when a high-ranking FBI official in Washington, D.C., contacted the Boston field office to enquire why two of their informants were being targeted by another federal agency. When the DEA sought the assistance of the FBI in the investigation, the FBI declined to participate or "close" either Bulger or Flemmi as informants.

In December 1984, Assistant U.S. Attorney Gary Crossen was granted court permission to wiretap Bulger. The DEA inserted a listening device in the windowsill of a condominium where Bulger lived in the Louisburg Square apartment complex in Quincy, but picked up little other than the sound of a television. Drug agents then installed another bug in the panel of Bulger's car door; this device also failed to collect evidence as the car radio drowned out any conversation in the car. On March 11, 1985, days after the car bug had been planted, Bulger took the vehicle to a garage in South Boston and had a mechanic disassemble the door. When he discovered a small microphone hidden inside, DEA agents arrived to retrieve the equipment. Flemmi later testified that Connolly had provided him and Bulger with information about developments in the investigation. Although numerous drug traffickers were indicted as a result of the DEA investigation, Bulger and Flemmi escaped any prosecution on narcotics charges until 1995. When Operation Beans concluded in mid-1985, DEA agent Steven Boeri sent Bulger and Flemmi a congratulations card.

By the late 1980s, most of South Boston's cocaine and marijuana trafficking was under the control of a crew led by mobster John Shea. According to Weeks, Bulger briefly considered killing Shea but eventually decided to extort a weekly cut of his profits. Bulger enforced strict rules over the dealers who operated on his territory, strictly forbidding the use of PCP and selling drugs to children, adding that those dealers who refused to obey his rules would be violently driven out of his turf. In August 1990, Shea and fifty others were arrested at the end of an investigation by the DEA, the MSP and the BPD. Bulger, Flemmi and Weeks were subjected to intense DEA surveillance in 1989 and 1990 but escaped being charged in the investigation. The DEA crackdown—which targeted three separate drug rings led by Shea, Paul Moore and Hobart Willis, each of whom reported to Bulger—effectively put Bulger's drug operations out of business. Shea quietly served a long prison sentence and refused to admit to having paid protection money to Bulger, Flemmi and Weeks. Shea repeatedly got into fights with other inmates who accused Bulger of being "a rat," earning him a legendary reputation in South Boston.

It was not until the 1999 cooperation of Weeks that Bulger, by then a fugitive, was conclusively linked to the drug trade by investigators. According to an interview conducted with Globe reporters Kevin Cullen and Shelley Murphy, Weeks "estimated that Whitey made about thirty million dollars... most of it from shaking down drug dealers to let them do business on his turf."

=== Murder of Arthur "Bucky" Barrett ===
The Winter Hill Gang used an unoccupied house owned by Patrick Nee's brother Michael, located at 799 East Third Street in South Boston, to extort wealthy criminals. One such criminal was Arthur "Bucky" Barrett, a safecracker and thief who allegedly participated in the theft of $1.5 million from the Depositors Trust bank in Medford on Memorial Day Weekend of 1980. Barrett had refused to give Bulger a cut of the money from the heist, and instead paid the Patriarca family for protection. On November 30, 1983, Barrett was lured to 799 East Third Street for a purported diamonds sale. When he arrived, Bulger drew a machine gun and yelled: "Bucky Barrett, freeze!" Bulger and Flemmi then chained Barrett to a chair, and over several hours, Barrett directed the gangsters to the location of $57,000 in hidden cash; $47,000 was retrieved from his home, and another $10,000 from a bar.

After Bulger, Flemmi and Weeks returned to the house with the money, they stood Barrett up and Bulger announced: "Bucky's going to go downstairs and lie down for a while." As Barrett walked downstairs to the basement with Bulger and Flemmi, Bulger shot Barrett in the back of the head without warning, causing Barrett's body to hit Flemmi, who tumbled down the stairs with the corpse. An angry Flemmi told Bulger: "You could have shot me!"

Immediately following the murder, Bulger reclined in a couch. Meanwhile, in the basement, Flemmi removed Barrett's teeth in the belief it would prevent later identification while Weeks and Patrick Nee dug a grave in the basement's dirt floor. Afterwards, Nee expressed anger that Barrett had been killed, expecting only an extortion to take place. Nee's brother was vacationing in Florida at the time of the murder and remained unaware that Barrett's body had been buried in his basement.

=== Arms trafficking ===
During the most violent period of the Troubles, sympathy for Irish nationalism and the Provisional Irish Republican Army (IRA) was common in South Boston, as were efforts to raise money and smuggle weapons for the IRA's campaign against the British military occupation in Northern Ireland. From the start of his involvement with the FBI, Bulger emphatically refused to betray the IRA.

In the early 1980s, Bulger donated to NORAID and shipped weapons across the Atlantic Ocean inside a van, only to be annoyed upon learning the IRA had burned the van. After meeting with IRA Chief of Staff Joe Cahill, Bulger and Nee raised $1 million (equivalent to $3.1 million in 2025) "by shaking down drug dealers in South Boston and Charlestown." This money was used to buy weapons which would be shipped to Northern Ireland aboard the trawler Valhalla. Bulger also personally donated some of his own weapons.

On September 13, 1984, Bulger, Weeks and Nee supervised the loading of Valhalla. The final caché included "91 rifles, 8 submachine guns, 13 shotguns, 51 handguns, 11 bullet-proof vests, 70,000 rounds of ammunition, plus an array of hand grenades and rocket heads." Valhalla departed Gloucester and rendezvoused 120 nautical miles (220 km; 140 mi) off the west coast of Ireland with Marita Ann, an IRA ship that had sailed from Tralee. During the return voyage, the Irish Navy stopped Marita Ann and seized the hidden arsenal, arresting IRA members Martin Ferris, Mike Browne and John Crawley. The operation had been compromised by IRA member Sean O'Callaghan, an informant for Ireland's police force. The seizure marked the complete end of any major attempt by the IRA to smuggle guns out of the U.S., which had largely ceased three years earlier with the arrest of their primary gunrunner, George Harrison, by the FBI.

The United States Customs Service received notice of the weapons transfer and seized Valhalla when it stopped in Boston on October 16, en route back to Gloucester. No weapons were found on the trawler, and neither of the two crew members on board were arrested. Several days later, however, Valhalla crew member John McIntyre was arrested in Quincy for drunk driving and confessed his role in the smuggling to the Quincy Police Department. Quincy police then arranged for the FBI, the DEA and the Customs Service to participate in McIntyre's debriefing.

McIntyre implicated Bulger in the botched gunrunning to FBI Agent Roderick Kennedy, who was friendly with Connolly. McIntyre also told authorities about drug smuggling activities involving the Winter Hill Gang, resulting in thirty-six tons of marijuana being seized by the DEA during a raid on the Norwegian freighter Ramsland as it entered Boston Harbor on November 16. After hearing of Kennedy's interview with a Valhalla crew member, Connolly told Bulger of the cooperation. Connolly confirmed Bulger's suspicions of McIntyre, leading Bulger and Flemmi to consider murdering McIntyre for his betrayal.

On November 30, 1984, McIntyre was lured to East Third Street by Nee and confronted by Bulger wielding a MAC-11 submachine gun. Weeks and Flemmi restrained McIntyre and chained him to a chair. According to Weeks, Bulger hoped to avoid murdering McIntyre, offering to send him to South America with money and the understanding that he was never to contact his family or friends again. After interrogating him over several hours, however, Bulger realized that McIntyre did not have the discipline to cut ties with everyone. Bulger unsuccessfully tried to strangle McIntyre with a boat rope, but when the rope proved too thick, he asked: "Do you want one in the head?" to which McIntyre responded: "Yes, please." Bulger then shot McIntyre. Weeks and Flemmi disposed of McIntyre's body in the same manner as they had Barrett while Bulger went upstairs to take a nap. After McIntyre's disappearance, an FBI agent named Philip Brady told McIntyre's family that he was likely murdered by the IRA.

On September 5, 2006, Judge Reginald C. Lindsay ruled that the mishandling of Bulger and Flemmi caused the murder of McIntyre, awarding his family $3.1 million in damages. Lindsay stated the FBI failed to properly supervise Connolly and "stuck its head in the sand" regarding numerous allegations that Bulger and Flemmi were involved in drug trafficking, murder and other crimes for decades.

=== Murder of Deborah Hussey ===
In 1985, Bulger decided to kill Flemmi's 26-year-old stepdaughter, Deborah Hussey, who he regarded as a liability. Hussey knew about the Winter Hill Gang's dealings and had started going to a bar they frequented, where she indiscriminately named Bulger and Flemmi in conversation to acquire money from low-level gangsters who feared her stepfather. When testifying against Bulger in his 2013 racketeering trial, Flemmi would later admit to receiving oral sex from his stepdaughter on at least two occasions. Marion Hussey, Deborah's mother and Flemmi's girlfriend, was allegedly aware of these liaisons.

On January 14, 1985, Flemmi drove Hussey to East Third Street, which Bulger now nicknamed "the Hauntey," where Bulger strangled Hussey in the kitchen. Weeks, who was also present, was taken by surprise by the murder as he was unaware Hussey would be killed. After Hussey was taken to the basement, Flemmi realized she was still alive and strangled her again by looping a rope around her neck, tying a stick to the rope and twisting it until she choked to death. The gangsters then followed their regular post-killing routine, with Bulger going upstairs, Flemmi removing Hussey's teeth and clothing and Flemmi and Weeks burying the body in the basement alongside those of Barrett and McIntyre. An associate of Flemmi, Phil Costa, provided lime to pour over the corpses to speed up decomposition.

When Michael Nee put the house up for sale, Bulger and Flemmi decided it would be easier and cheaper to rebury the bodies elsewhere than to buy the property themselves. After Flemmi acquired body bags from an undertaker, he, Bulger and Weeks exhumed the bodies and reinterred them at a vacant lot on Hallett Street in Dorchester. As Weeks stood guard with a rifle while Bulger and Flemmi reburied the remains, a young man stopped nearby to urinate. Failing to notice the reburials taking place, the man returned to his car and left the scene. An angry Bulger chastised Weeks for not shooting the man, saying there was "plenty of room in the hole."

=== Massachusetts Lottery ===
In the summer of 1991, Bulger and Weeks, along with associates Patrick and Michael Linskey, came into possession of a winning Massachusetts Lottery ticket which had been bought at a store he owned. The four men shared a prize of around US$14 million. Bulger was widely thought to have obtained his share of the jackpot illegitimately.

=== Downfall ===
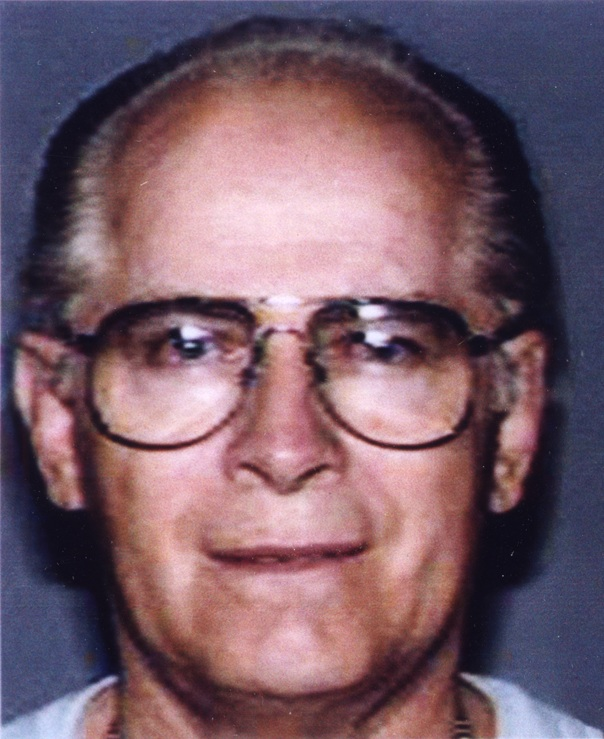
Photograph taken in 1994 (age 65)

After Connolly retired from the FBI in December 1990, Bulger and Flemmi were "closed" as informants as the Bureau no longer desired their services. In April 1994, a joint task force of the DEA, the MSP and the BPD launched a probe of Bulger's illegal gambling operations. The FBI, by this time considered compromised, was not informed. After a number of bookmakers agreed to testify to having paid protection money to Bulger, a federal case was built against him under the Racketeer Influenced and Corrupt Organizations Act (RICO).

According to Weeks:

In 1993 and 1994, before the pinches came down, Jimmy and Stevie were traveling on the French and Italian Riviera. The two of them traveled all over Europe, sometimes separating for a while. Sometimes they took girls, sometimes just the two of them went. They would rent cars and travel all through Europe. It was more preparation than anything, getting ready for another life. They didn't ask me to go, not that I would have wanted to. Jimmy had prepared for the run for years. He had established a whole other person, Thomas Baxter, with a complete ID and credit cards in that name. He had even joined associations in Baxter's name, building an entire portfolio for the guy. He had always said you had to be ready to take off on short notice. And he was.

Bulger had also set up safe deposit boxes containing cash, jewelry and passports in locations across North America and Europe, including Florida, Oklahoma, Montreal, Dublin, London, Birmingham and Venice. In December 1994, he was informed by Connolly that sealed indictments had come from the Department of Justice and that the FBI was set to make arrests during the Christmas season. In response, Bulger fled Boston on December 23, 1994, accompanied by his common-law wife Theresa Stanley.

In 1995, Bulger and Flemmi were indicted on racketeering charges along with two prominent Boston mafiosi, Frank Salemme and Bobby DeLuca. During the discovery phase, Salemme and DeLuca were listening to a tape from a roving bug, which is normally authorized when the FBI has no advance knowledge of where criminal activity will take place. They overheard two of the agents who were listening in on the bug mention offhandedly that they should have told one of their informants to give "a list of questions" while speaking to the mobsters. When their lawyer, Tony Cardinale, learned about this, he realized that the FBI had lied about the basis for the bug in order to protect an informant. Suspecting that this was not the first time such a thing had happened, Cardinale sought to force prosecutors to reveal the identities of any informants used in connection with the case.

Federal judge Mark L. Wolf granted Cardinale's motion on May 22, 1997. On June 3, Paul E. Coffey, the head of the Organized Crime and Racketeering Section of the Department of Justice, gave a sworn statement admitting that Bulger had been an FBI informant. Coffey stated that since Bulger was accused of "leading a criminal enterprise" while working as an informant and was also now a fugitive, he had "forfeited any reasonable expectation" that his identity would be protected.

== Fugitive ==
After fleeing Boston, Bulger and Stanley spent four days over Christmas in Selden, New York, before spending New Year's Day in a hotel in New Orleans's French Quarter. On January 5, 1995, Bulger prepared to return to Boston, believing that Connolly's tipoff had been a false alarm. That night, however, Flemmi was arrested outside a Boston restaurant by the DEA. BPD detective Michael Flemmi, Stephen's brother, informed Weeks of the arrest. Weeks immediately passed the information on to Bulger, who altered his plans.

Bulger and Stanley spent the next three weeks traveling to New York City, Los Angeles and San Francisco before Stanley decided that she wanted to return to her children. They traveled to Clearwater, Florida, where Bulger retrieved his "Tom Baxter" identification from a safety deposit box. He then drove to Boston and dropped off Stanley in a parking lot. Bulger met with Weeks at Malibu Beach in Dorchester, where Weeks brought Bulger's longtime girlfriend, Catherine Greig. Bulger and Greig then went on the run together.

In his memoirs, Weeks describes a clandestine meeting with Bulger and Greig in Chicago in which he reminisced fondly about his time hiding out with a family in Louisiana. Bulger told Weeks, who had replaced him as head of the Winter Hill Gang, "If anything comes down, put it on me." As they adjourned to a nearby Japanese restaurant, Bulger finally revealed how exhausted he was with life on the run. He told Weeks, "Every day out there is another day I beat them. Every good meal is a meal they can't take away from me."

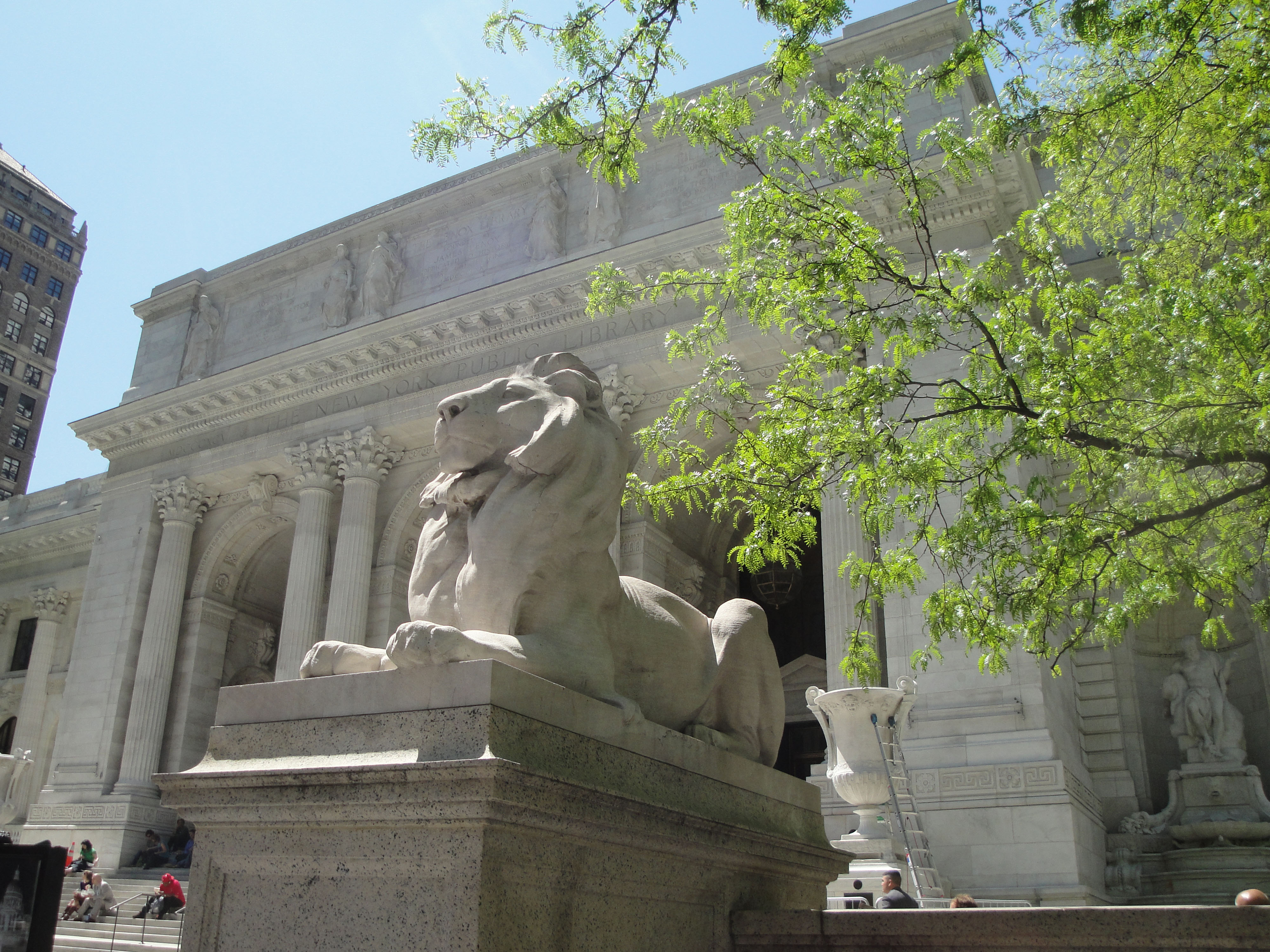
New York Public Library Main Branch, 42nd Street and 5th Avenue

In mid-November 1995, Weeks and Bulger met for the final time at the lion statues at the front of the New York Public Library Main Branch and adjourned for dinner at a nearby restaurant. According to Weeks:

At the end of our dinner, he seemed more aware of everything around him. His tone was a little more serious, and there wasn't as much joking as usual. He repeated the phrase he had used before that a rolling stone gathers no moss, which told me that he knew he was going to be on the move again. I got the feeling that he was resigning himself to the fact that he wasn't coming back. Up until then, I always believed he thought there was a chance he had beat the case. However, at that point, there was something different going on with him. I didn't fully understand all the aspects of his case. It would be another six months before it became clearer. Yet at that moment, in that restaurant in New York, I sensed that he had moved to a new place in his mind. It was over. He'd never return to South Boston.

On July 7, 1996, a federal grand jury in Boston returned a twenty-nine-count indictment against Bulger and four other leaders of the Winter Hill Gang and the Patriarca family; Bulger was indicted on thirteen counts of racketeering. On May 23, 2001, Bulger, along with Stephen and Michael Flemmi, were charged in a forty-eight-count federal indictment with racketeering, murder and other crimes.

On November 17, 1999, Weeks was arrested by a combined force of the DEA and the MSP. Although by this time he was aware of Bulger's FBI deal, he was determined to remain faithful to South Boston's code of silence even though he potentially faced dying in prison if convicted. However, while awaiting trial in Rhode Island's Wyatt Detention Facility, Weeks was approached by a fellow inmate, a "made man" in the Patriarca family, who suggested that Weeks turn informer. The Patriarca soldier told him, "Kid, what are you doing? Are you going to take it up the ass for these guys? Remember, you can't rat on a rat. Those guys have been giving up everyone for thirty years."

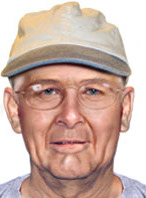
Digital age progression of Bulger done in 2004, in efforts toward his arrest

In the aftermath, Weeks decided to cut a deal with federal prosecutors and revealed all of the Winter Hill Gang's secrets. Writing in 2006, he recalled:

I had known all along, however, that it would not be easy for anyone to capture Jimmy. If he saw them coming, he would take them with him. He wouldn't hesitate. Even before he went on the run, he would always say, "Let's all go to hell together." And he meant it. I also knew that Jimmy wouldn't go to trial. He would rather plead out to a life sentence than put his family through the embarrassment of a trial. If he had a gun on him, he would go out in a blaze of glory rather than spend the rest of his life in jail. But I don't think they'll ever catch him.

=== Manhunt ===
The first confirmed sighting of Bulger before his capture was in London in 2002, when a businessman watching Hannibal (2001) recognized Bulger in a photograph during a scene featuring the website of the FBI's most wanted fugitives. However, there were unconfirmed sightings elsewhere. At one point, FBI agents were sent to Uruguay to investigate a lead. Other agents were sent to stake out the 60th anniversary celebrations of the Battle of Normandy, as Bulger was reportedly an enthusiastic fan of military history. Later reports of a sighting in Italy in April 2007 proved false. Two people on video footage shot in Taormina, Sicily, formerly thought to be Bulger and Greig walking in the streets of the city center, were later identified as a tourist couple from Germany.

In 2010, the FBI turned its focus to Victoria, British Columbia, on Vancouver Island. In pursuit of Bulger, a known book lover, the FBI visited bookstores in the area, questioned employees and distributed wanted posters. Following his arrest, Bulger revealed that instead of being reclusive, he had in fact traveled frequently, with witnesses coming forward to say they had seen him on the Santa Monica Pier and elsewhere in southern California. A confirmed report by an off-duty Boston police officer after a San Diego screening of The Departed (2005) also led to a search in southern California that lasted "a few weeks".

=== Capture ===
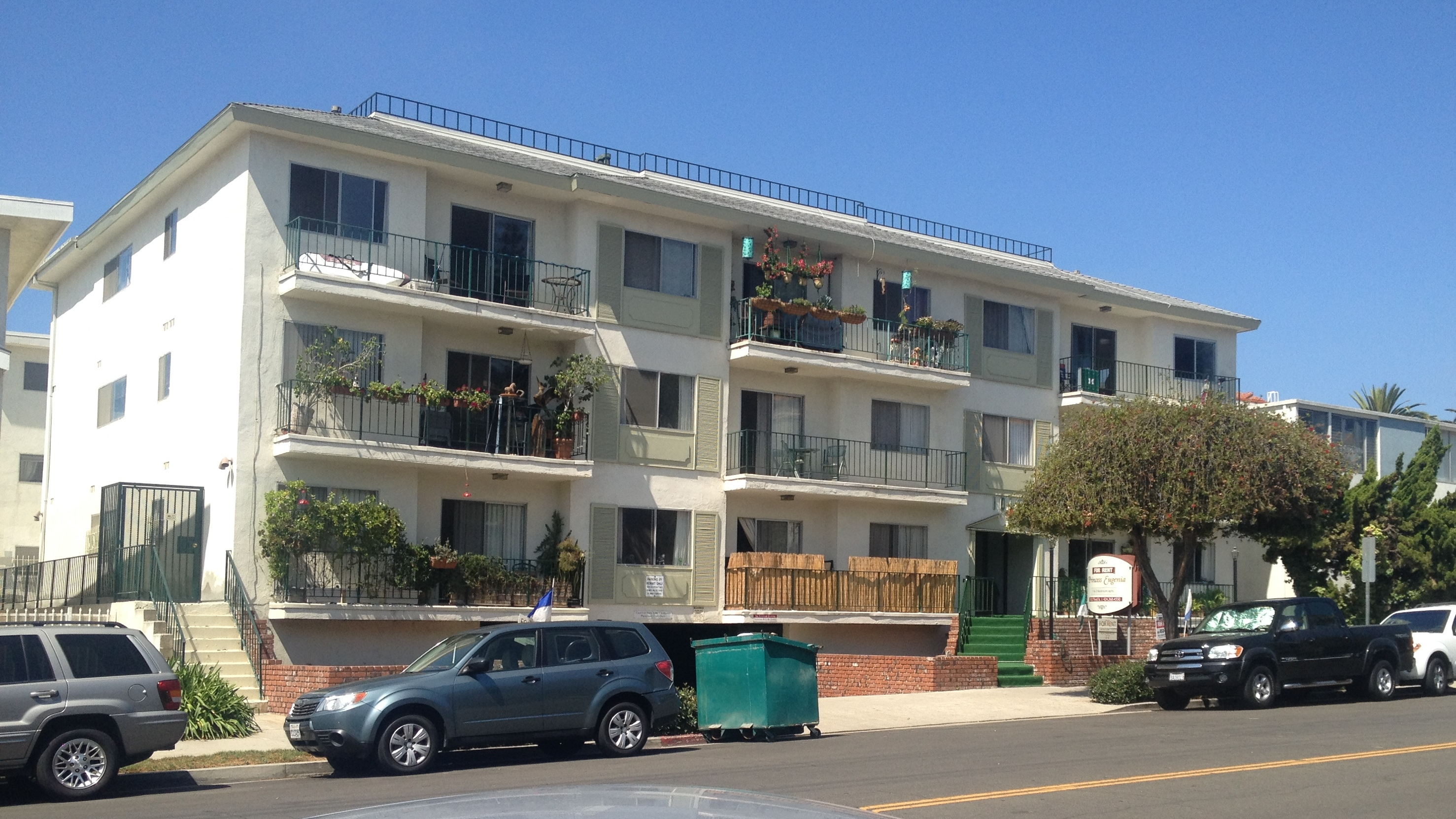
The apartment building in Santa Monica, California, where Bulger lived as a fugitive for at least 15 years. Bulger's residence is the top right room.

After sixteen years at large and twelve years on the FBI Ten Most Wanted Fugitives list, Bulger was arrested in Santa Monica, California, on June 22, 2011. He was eighty-one years old at the time of the arrest.

Bulger was captured as a result of the work of the Bulger Fugitive Task Force, which consisted of FBI agents and a Deputy U.S. Marshal. According to retired FBI agent Scott Bakken, "Here you have somebody who is far more sophisticated than some 18-year-old who killed someone in a drive-by. To be a successful fugitive you have to cut all contacts from your previous life. He had the means and kept a low profile."

A reward of US$2 million had been offered for information leading to his capture. This amount was second only to Osama bin Laden's capture reward on the FBI's Ten Most Wanted Fugitives list. Bulger had been featured on the Fox television show America's Most Wanted sixteen times, first in 1995, and finally on October 2, 2010. According to authorities, the arrests were a "direct result" of the media campaign launched by the FBI in fourteen television markets across the country where Bulger and Greig reportedly had ties. The campaign focused on Greig, describing her as an animal lover who frequently went to beauty salons.

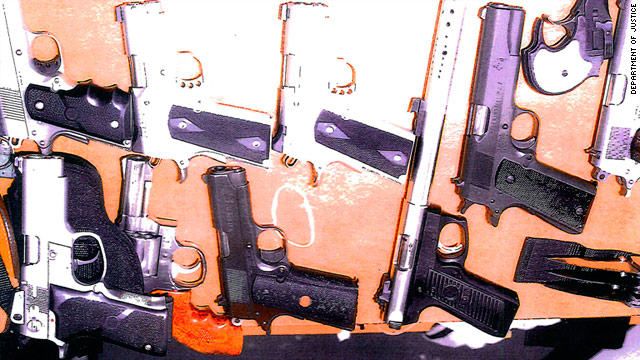
Some of the weapons found in Bulger's apartment

Authorities received a tip from a woman in Iceland that Bulger was living in an apartment near a beach in Santa Monica. The Globe identified the tipster as Anna Björnsdóttir, a former model, actress and Miss Iceland 1974, who lived in Bulger's neighborhood. One day later, "using a ruse, agents and other task force members lured Mr. Bulger out of his apartment", "arrested him 'without incident', then went in the house and arrested Greig". During the raid the FBI found, "Weapons all over the apartment" and "loaded shotguns, mini rugers [sic], rifles."

Bulger was charged with murder, "conspiracy to commit murder, extortion, narcotics distribution and money-laundering". Agents found "more than $800,000 in cash, 30 firearms, and fake IDs" at the apartment. Carmen Ortiz, U.S. attorney for the District of Massachusetts, said "she believes the death penalty is not an option in the federal charges Bulger faces in her district, but that he could face the death penalty for two cases outside the district". In Oklahoma, where Bulger is alleged to have ordered the killing of Roger Wheeler in 1981, Tulsa County District Attorney Tim Harris said, "It is our intention to bring Bulger to justice and to be held accountable for the murder of Mr. Wheeler". In Florida, Miami-Dade State Attorney Katherine Fernandez Rundle said, "After a 16-year delay, I will be working to ensure that a Miami jury has the opportunity to look [Bulger] in the eyes and determine his fate".

Immediately after being brought back to Boston, Bulger began talking to authorities. He said that during his days as a fugitive he often went back and forth across the border to Mexico to buy medicine for heart disease. He also reported that if he thought he was going to die, he planned to die with his body hidden so that authorities would always be looking for him. Many anticipated that Bulger, in exchange for favorable treatment in sentencing, would have much to tell authorities about the corruption at the local, state and federal levels which allowed him to operate his criminal enterprise for so long.

Bulger was arraigned in federal court on July 6, 2011. He pleaded not guilty to forty-eight charges, including nineteen counts of murder, extortion, money laundering, obstruction of justice, perjury, narcotics distribution and weapons violations.

In a 2011 interview, Weeks expressed surprise at Bulger's decision to cooperate after his arrest. Weeks said, "I don't understand because he's not the same as I remember him. I can't believe he's so chatty right now. So I don't know what he's doing". Weeks added that he was not afraid of Bulger, and that the residents of Boston should not be either: "I don't think he's Pablo Escobar where he can just walk out of his prison cell and come to South Boston or anywhere. No, no one's worried about him."

=== Catherine Greig ===
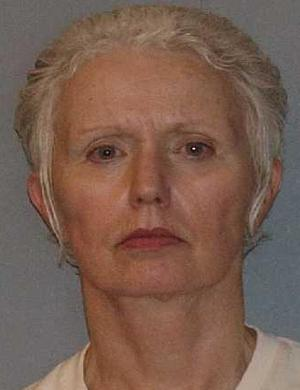
Catherine E. Greig (age 60), Bulger's girlfriend (2011)

Bulger's companion during his years as a fugitive was his longtime girlfriend, Catherine Greig (b. April 3, 1951). Greig grew up in Boston and had an identical twin sister, Margaret, and a younger brother, David. Their father was a machinist from Glasgow, Scotland, and their mother was from Canada.

In 1971, at about age 20, Greig married Robert "Bobby" McGonagle, a Boston firefighter. Her identical twin sister, Margaret, married Robert McGonagle's brother, Paul. The McGonagle brothers came from a family that led the Mullen Gang. Robert was injured during a mob gunfight in 1969. Before his fatal drug overdose in 1987, he reportedly held Bulger responsible for the murders of his twin brothers, Paul and Donald, who were killed in the fighting which occurred during the Mullen-Killeen gang war. Paul's body was buried for twenty-five years on Tenean Beach in Dorchester.

Greig began dating Bulger in 1975, at age 24, after she split from McGonagle two years previously. The couple were officially granted a divorce in 1977. She worked as a dental hygienist prior to fleeing with Bulger. Greig has been described as intelligent, hardworking and educated, although she was very subservient to and dominated by Bulger. The pair lived together for a time at her home in Squantum, a section of Quincy. In 1982, they began sharing a condominium in Quincy's Louisburg Square South apartment complex.

Before going on the run with Bulger, Grieg was last observed by the FBI on January 5, 1995, as she and Weeks were under surveillance in an attempt to locate Bulger. Greig had been wanted by the FBI since 1999. In 2000, the FBI received a tip of a sighting of Greig in Fountain Valley, California. The criminal complaint against her alleges that she harbored a fugitive, referring to Bulger. She was represented in the criminal proceedings by the criminal attorney Kevin Reddington of Brockton, Massachusetts. After being captured with Bulger, Greig sought release on bail and home confinement, a request that was denied.

Greig initially indicated that she would go to trial rather than accept a plea bargain. In March 2012, however, she pleaded guilty to conspiracy to harbor a fugitive, identity fraud and conspiracy to commit identity fraud. On June 12, 2012, Grieg was sentenced to eight years in federal prison. She declined to speak during her sentencing.

In September 2015, Greig was indicted on a charge of criminal contempt stemming from her refusal to testify before a grand jury about whether other people aided Bulger while he was a fugitive. In February 2016 she pleaded guilty to this charge. Greig's attorney recommended twelve months in prison, while prosecutors—citing Greig's "unrepentant ... obstruction"—asked for thirty-seven months. In April 2016, U.S. District Judge F. Dennis Saylor IV sentenced Greig, then midway through her sentence for harboring Bulger, to twenty-one months on the contempt charge, pushing her release date to late 2020.

Greig served much of her eight-year sentence at the Federal Correctional Institution, Waseca in Minnesota, but was also detained at various points in Rhode Island ahead of proceedings in the criminal contempt case. Greig completed her sentence on July 23, 2020, and was later released from home confinement and electronic monitoring.

=== Final detention ===
According to an excerpt of a book on Bulger published by Boston magazine, Bulger only made one friend during his post-sentencing detention, Clement "Chip" Janis, a young convict who was trusted to run art classes for other convicts.

According to Janis, upon his arrival at the United States Penitentiary, Tucson, Bulger was attacked by a fellow convict nicknamed "Retro", whose knife pierced Bulger's neck and skull and sent him to the prison infirmary for a month. Whether Bulger was targeted randomly or deliberately is not known. Apparently, Retro was not motivated by any personal issues with Bulger, but committed the near-fatal assault so that he would be sent to solitary confinement, allegedly to avoid paying for drugs he had acquired from other prisoners.

Bulger was able to begin taking part in counseling with a prison psychologist at Tucson Penitentiary. However, rumors circulated that the psychologist was too sympathetic to Bulger, and may even have allowed him to use her cell phone. His counseling was soon terminated, and he was transferred to the Coleman Federal Correctional Complex in Florida.

At Coleman, Bulger started experiencing night terrors, which he attributed to the experiments he had taken part in while incarcerated in the 1950s. Bulger, who started his imprisonment with a rigorous exercise regime, was by this point using a wheelchair.

== Racketeering trial and conviction ==
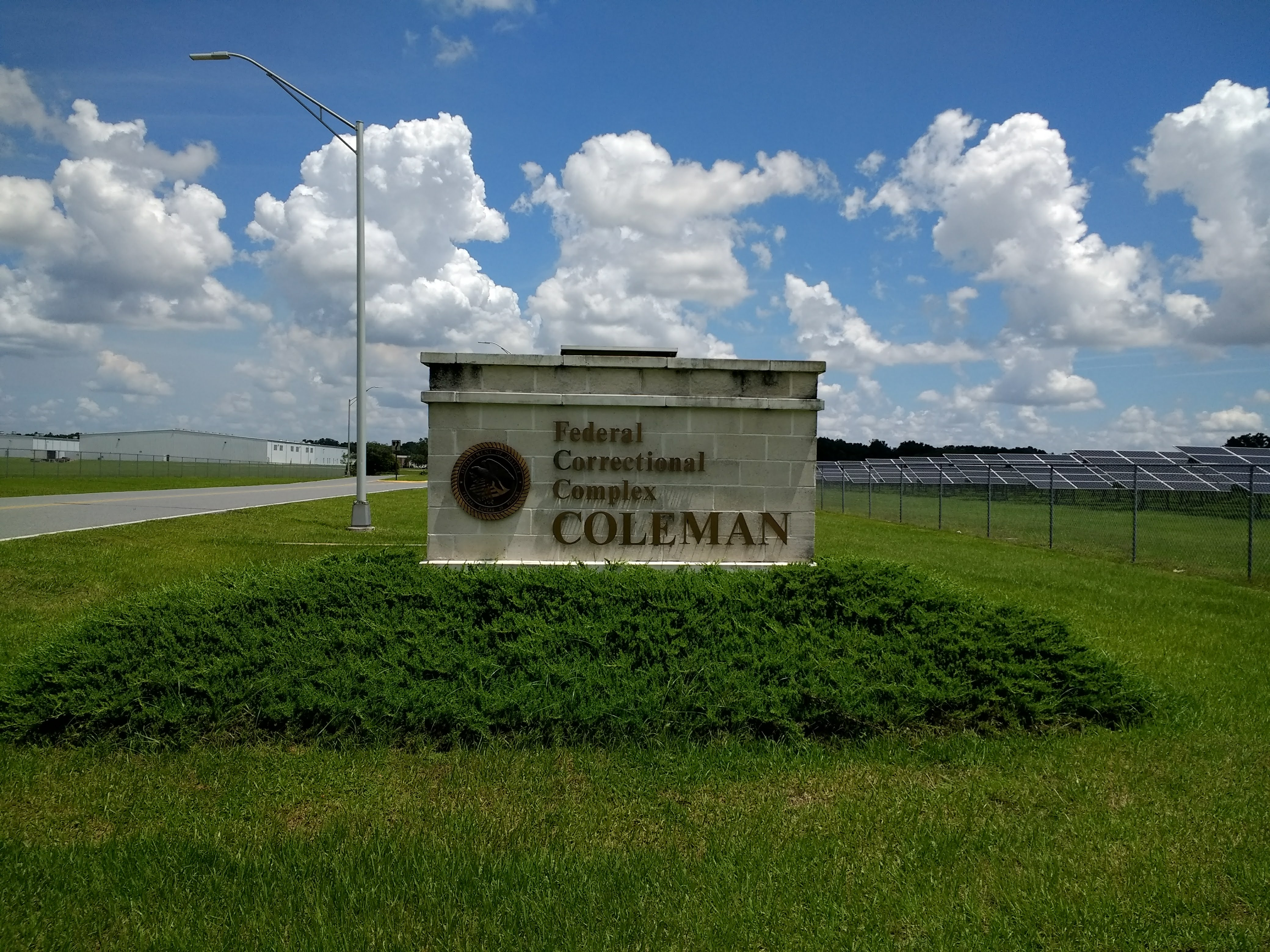
The United States Federal Correctional Complex Coleman where Bulger was held until October 2018

On June 12, 2013, Bulger went on trial in South Boston's John Joseph Moakley United States Courthouse before Judge Denise J. Casper on thirty-two counts of racketeering and firearms possession. The racketeering counts included allegations that Bulger was complicit in nineteen murders. The trial lasted two months and included the testimony of seventy-two witnesses; the jury began deliberations August 6.

On August 12, the jury convicted Bulger of thirty-one out of thirty-two counts in the indictment. As part of the racketeering charges, the jury convicted Bulger of the murders of eleven victims—Paul McGonagle, Edward Connors, Thomas King, Richard Castucci, Roger Wheeler, Brian Halloran, Michael Donahue, John Callahan, Arthur "Bucky" Barrett, John McIntyre and Deborah Hussey.

The jury acquitted Bulger of killing Michael Milano, Al Plummer, William O'Brien, James O'Toole, Al Notorangeli, James Sousa and Francis Leonard. They reported themselves unable to agree about the murder of Debra Davis, though Bulger had already been found liable for her death in a civil suit. Following the verdict, Bulger's attorneys J. W. Carney Jr. and Hank Brennan vowed to appeal, citing Casper's ruling which prevented Bulger from claiming he had been given immunity.

On November 14, 2013, Bulger was sentenced to two terms of life imprisonment, plus five years. Casper told Bulger that such a sentence was necessary given his "unfathomable" crimes, some of which inflicted "agonizing" suffering on his victims. He was also ordered to forfeit $25.2 million and pay $19.5 million in restitution. Prosecutors in Florida and Oklahoma announced after Bulger's conviction that they would wait until after sentencing concluded before deciding whether or not to prosecute Bulger in their states. Bulger was indicted in Florida for the murder of Callahan and in Oklahoma for the murder of Wheeler, and could have received the death penalty in those states.

In September 2014, Bulger entered the Coleman II United States Penitentiary in Sumterville, Florida. In October 2018, he was transferred to the Federal Transfer Center in Oklahoma City, and then a few days later to the United States Federal Penitentiary, Hazelton in West Virginia. According to prison documents obtained by The New York Times, Bulger gained a reputation for disconcerting behavior during his time in prison: "At the Coleman prison complex in Florida in September 2014, he was disciplined multiple times, including once for masturbating in front of a male staff member and once, in February, for threatening a female medical staff member". Bulger was also in poor health, as he was unable to walk and had a damaged hip, often falling out of bed. His health also declined due to a lack of exercise.

== Death ==
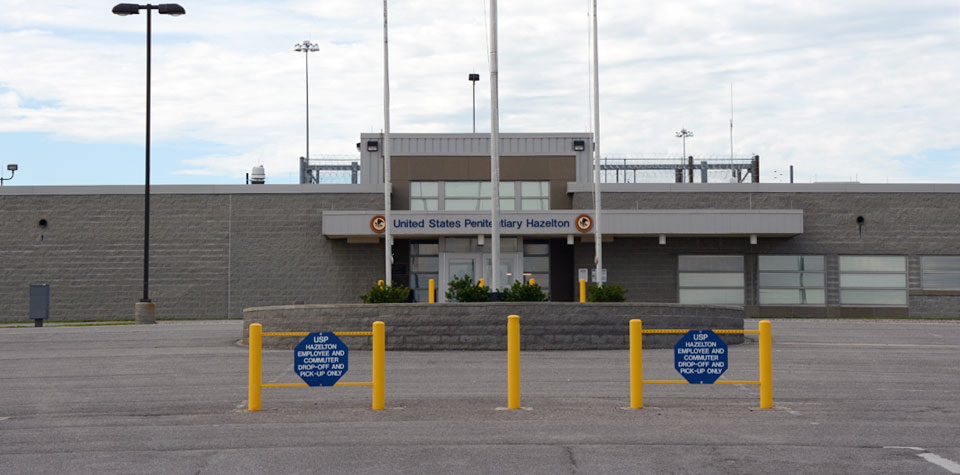
United States Penitentiary, Hazelton, where Bulger was killed

Bulger was transferred from the Federal Transfer Center in Oklahoma City to Hazelton Penitentiary in West Virginia on October 29, 2018. At 8:20 a.m. on October 30, the 89-year-old Bulger was found dead. Bulger was in a wheelchair and had been beaten to death by multiple inmates armed with a sock-wrapped padlock and a shiv. His eyes had nearly been gouged out and his tongue almost cut off; a law enforcement official described Bulger as "unrecognizable".

Bulger's was the third homicide at Hazelton in a forty-day span. Correctional officers had warned Congress just days before his death that facilities were being dangerously understaffed.

Fotios "Freddy" Geas, a Western Massachusetts-based hitman for the Genovese crime family, was the prime suspect in orchestrating the killing of Bulger. Geas, 51, and his brother were sentenced to life in prison in 2011 for their roles in several violent crimes, including the 2003 killing of Adolfo "Big Al" Bruno, a Genovese family captain who was shot in a Springfield, Massachusetts, parking lot. Bulger's medical status had been lowered on October 8, 2018, shortly before he was transferred.

On November 8, 2018, a funeral Mass was held for Bulger at Saint Monica – Saint Augustine Church in South Boston. Family members, including Bulger's brother William and Catherine Greig's sister Margaret, attended. Bulger's death came as a relief to many Bostonians, especially for family members of his victims; Steven Davis, whose sister Debra was reportedly killed by Bulger in 1981, stated that "[h]e died the way I hoped he always was going to die."

Bulger is buried at St. Joseph's Cemetery in the Boston neighborhood of West Roxbury. His headstone is blank, except for the inscription “Bulger”.

In September 2019, the Bulger family filed a wrongful death lawsuit against the Justice Department, alleging that, by lowering Bulger's medical status and transferring him to Hazelton, he "was deliberately placed in harm's way. There is simply no other explanation for the transfer of someone in his condition and inmate status to be placed in the general population of one of the country's most violent federal penitentiaries." The Bulger family sought US$200,000 in damages. In January 2022, U.S. District Judge John Preston Bailey dismissed the lawsuit, ruling federal law did not allow his family the right to sue Federal Bureau of Prisons (BOP) officials because Congress expressly puts custody of inmates in the hands of the BOP, and "has repeatedly limited judicial authority to review BOP housing decisions and to entertain claims brought by prisoners."

On August 18, 2022, Geas was indicted in connection with the beating death of Bulger, along with Paul J. DeCologero and Sean McKinnon. On May 14, 2024, the Justice Department announced that plea agreements with the three had been accepted. On September 6, 2024, Geas was sentenced to twenty-five years' imprisonment for voluntary manslaughter in Bulger's killing.

== Family ==
Bulger had two younger brothers, William Michael "Billy" Bulger (born 1934) and John "Jackie" P. Bulger (1938–2026). William Bulger served in the military during the Korean War but was never posted to Korea. He was formerly an influential leader of the Democratic Party in Massachusetts. In a long political career, William rose to become President of the Massachusetts Senate. After his retirement he was appointed President of the University of Massachusetts system.

In December 2002, William Bulger appeared before the House Committee on Oversight and Government Reform and refused to testify, citing his Fifth Amendment right against self-incrimination. In April 2003, the committee voted "to grant William Bulger immunity to obtain information concerning Whitey's whereabouts and the FBI's misuse of informants."

In June 2003, William appeared before the committee, where he was grilled by legislators from both parties. He testified: "I do not know where my brother is. I do not know where he has been over the past eight years. I have not aided James Bulger in any way while he has been a fugitive." He added: "while I worried about my brother, I now recognize that I didn't fully grasp the dimensions of his life. Few people probably did. By definition, his was a secretive life. His actions were covert, hidden even from—or perhaps hidden especially from those who loved and cared about him. The subject that interests so many, the life and the activities of my brother James is painful and difficult for me."

William said that the only contact with his brother during the fugitive years was a short telephone call in January 1995, shortly after his brother was indicted. Following this testimony, Massachusetts governor Mitt Romney waged an extended and ultimately successful effort to get William to resign from the presidency of the University of Massachusetts, which he did in August 2003.

John "Jackie" Bulger, a retired Massachusetts court clerk magistrate, was convicted in April 2003 of committing perjury in front of two grand juries regarding sworn statements he gave concerning contacts with his fugitive brother.

== Personal life ==
Bulger fathered one child, Douglas Glenn Cyr (1967–1973), during a 12-year relationship with Lindsey Cyr (1945–2019), a waitress and former fashion model living in North Weymouth, Massachusetts. Bulger and Cyr began living together in 1966, when Cyr was 21 and a waitress at a North Quincy café. According to Cyr, "He used to say that there were four people he would turn up on a street corner for: Douglas, me, Billy, or his mother. And we all made him vulnerable." At six years of age, Douglas died from Reye syndrome after having a severe allergic reaction to an aspirin injection. Lindsey Cyr later recalled it as:

An absolute nightmare, and it was very difficult for Jimmy because, no matter what, there was nothing that could save this. Money didn't matter, his power didn't matter. [...] I remember that we were walking out of the hospital the night that he died, and he was holding my hand. And Jimmy said, "I'm never going to hurt like this again."

After Bulger's arrest, Cyr announced her support of him, stating:

If he wanted to see me, I'd be happy to. If he needs help getting attorneys and what have you, I'd be happy to help him. Part of me does [still love him]. I still care for him. I would always help him. I certainly always stand by him. He is the father of my child. He is 12 years of my life. I want to see him well protected. [...] And I'm not particularly sympathetic to some of the people involved, some of the victims' families.

After his split from Cyr, Bulger began a relationship with Theresa Stanley, a South Boston divorcée with several children. Bulger bought her an expensive house in suburban Quincy, Massachusetts, and acted as father to her children while commuting to "work" in South Boston. However, he was repeatedly unfaithful to her with a host of other women, and was often absent while overseeing the running of his organization. In a 2004 interview, Stanley stated that she was planning to publish her memoirs; however, she died of lung cancer in 2012 at the age of 71.

=== Child molestation accusations ===
Stephen Flemmi and Whitey Bulger are alleged to have committed statutory rape against numerous underage girls, some as young as 13, during the 1970s and 1980s, deliberately getting them hooked on heroin and then sexually exploiting them for years.

== Press relations ==
According to Weeks:

Most of the time, The Boston Globe wasn't as inaccurate as the Herald. They just knocked the people from Southie during busing. They also liked to describe me as, 'Whitey's surrogate son', another example of the media putting labels on people they wrote about. Jimmy and I were friends, not like father and son. Even though he was the boss, he always treated me equally, like an associate, not a son. The reporter who seemed to do the most research and put real effort into getting the true story without having been there was Shelley Murphy, who had been at the Herald for ten years when she went to work for the Globe in 1993. But Jimmy and I usually ended up laughing at most of the news stories, as time and time again the media had it wrong, over and over again holding to their pledge to never let the truth get in the way of a good story.

=== Paul Corsetti ===
According to Weeks's memoirs, in 1980 Boston Herald reporter Paul Corsetti began researching an article about Louis Litif's murder and Bulger's suspected involvement. After reporting the story for several days, Corsetti was approached by a man who said, "I'm Jim Bulger and if you continue to write shit about me, I'm going to blow your fucking head off." Corsetti sought help from the Patriarca crime family, but they said that Bulger was outside their control. "The next day, Corsetti reported the meeting to the Boston police. He was issued a pistol permit within 24 hours. The cop who gave him the permit told him, 'I'm glad my last name is not Corsetti.' A couple days later Jimmy told me about the scene with the cop and was glad to hear how uncomfortable he had made Corsetti."

=== Howie Carr ===
In his memoirs, Kevin Weeks related his participation in an attempt to assassinate reporter Howie Carr at his house in suburban Acton. Weeks stated that Carr was targeted because he was "writing nasty stories about people, he was an oxygen thief who didn't deserve to breathe." Carr has been among the most aggressive critics of the Bulger brothers, Whitey and Billy, for their careers in the Boston area; among his works is the book The Brothers Bulger, detailing the Bulger brothers' 25-year period of controlling Boston politics and the Boston underworld.

Weeks stated that, although several plans were considered, all were abandoned because there was too much risk of injuring Carr's wife and children. The plans climaxed with Weeks' own attempt to shoot Carr with a sniper rifle as he came out of his house. However, when Carr came out the front door holding the hand of his young daughter, Weeks could not bring himself to shoot. He wanted another opportunity to "finish the job," but Bulger advised him to forget about Howie Carr.

In his 2006 memoir, Weeks said that although he was aware of the public outcry that would have followed, he regretted not murdering Carr. "His murder would have been an attack on the system, like attacking freedom of the press, the fabric of the American way of life, and they would have spared no expense to solve the crime. But in the long run, Jimmy and I got sidetracked and the maggot lived. Still, I wish I'd killed him. No question about it."

== Depictions in fiction and non-fiction ==
- The 2014 documentary film Whitey: United States of America v. James J. Bulger, made by Joe Berlinger, is based on Bulger's trials.
- The film Black Mass – released September 18, 2015, in the US – stars Johnny Depp as Bulger and was directed by Scott Cooper. The film's screenplay is based on the 2001 non-fiction book Black Mass: The True Story of an Unholy Alliance Between the FBI and the Irish Mob, by Dick Lehr and Gerard O'Neill.

=== Characters based on Whitey Bulger ===
- The character of Frank Costello (played by Jack Nicholson) in the 2006 Martin Scorsese film The Departed is loosely based on Bulger.
- The 2006–2008 Showtime TV series Brotherhood, about two Irish-American brothers on opposite sides of the law, was inspired by the relationship between Whitey and Billy Bulger, although the show takes place not in Boston but in nearby Providence, Rhode Island.
- The 2013 television drama The Blacklist starring James Spader, as career criminal and former naval intelligence officer Raymond Reddington, who turns himself in to work with the FBI on his own terms. His character was inspired by Bulger's arrest and trial.
- The character Marty Butler in Dennis Lehane's novel Small Mercies was heavily inspired by Bulger.
- While the DC Comics villain Carmine Falcone was inspired by Vito Corleone from The Godfather trilogy in the source material, director Matt Reeves claimed to have patterned his iteration of the character after Bulger in The Batman film released in 2022, portrayed by John Turturro. A younger version of Falcone is portrayed by Mark Strong in The Penguin spin-off miniseries which premiered in 2024.
