= Old Colony Housing Project =

Public housing in Boston, Massachusetts

The Old Colony Housing Project is a 16.7-acre public housing project located in South Boston, Massachusetts. First built in 1940 as a cluster of 22 three-story brick buildings housing 873 low-income units, It is one of the Boston Housing Authority's oldest developments.

== Location ==
Old Colony is roughly a triangle, bordered by East 8th Street, Dorchester Street, Old Colony Avenue, and Columbia Road. It adjoins a traffic circle to the southwest and Babe Ruth Park, a youth park with baseball fields, to the south. 42.3318°N 71.050666°W

Across the street from Old Colony, on the rotary to the southwest, is where James "Whitey" Bulger owned a liquor store and headquartered his organized crime ring. He grew up in the nearby Old Harbor Village housing project, later renamed the Mary Ellen McCormack housing project. The liquor store, formerly South Boston Liquor Mart, later became Kippy's Wine and Spirits, and as of 2017, it is Rotary Liquors.

== Prominent residents ==
- U.S. Representative Stephen Lynch
- Michael Patrick MacDonald, grew up there and later chronicled his Old Colony experiences in his memoir All Souls: A Family Story From Southie.
- Joseph M. Tierney, the late Boston City Councilor and father of actress Maura Tierney of ER and NewsRadio fame.
- Kevin Weeks, Winter Hill Gang, mobster and bodyguard of Whitey Bulger

== Redevelopment ==
Old Colony is currently in the middle of a three-phase redevelopment that is moving most of its tenants from the original large multi-family complexes to mixed housing in newly constructed townhouse rows and apartment buildings that will replace the 1940s structures. Phase I, which replaced rows of brick buildings containing 164 units with 116 new affordable townhouse units along Old Colony Avenue and Columbia Road, commenced in late 2010 and was finished in March 2012. Phase II, which was partially financed by a $22 million HOPE VI Revitalization grant from the US Department of Housing and Urban Development, was completed in 2014. The groundbreaking for Phase III, which will replace 250 original housing units with 305 new housing units, was held on February 14, 2019.
