= Denise J. Casper =

American judge (born 1968)

Denise Casper
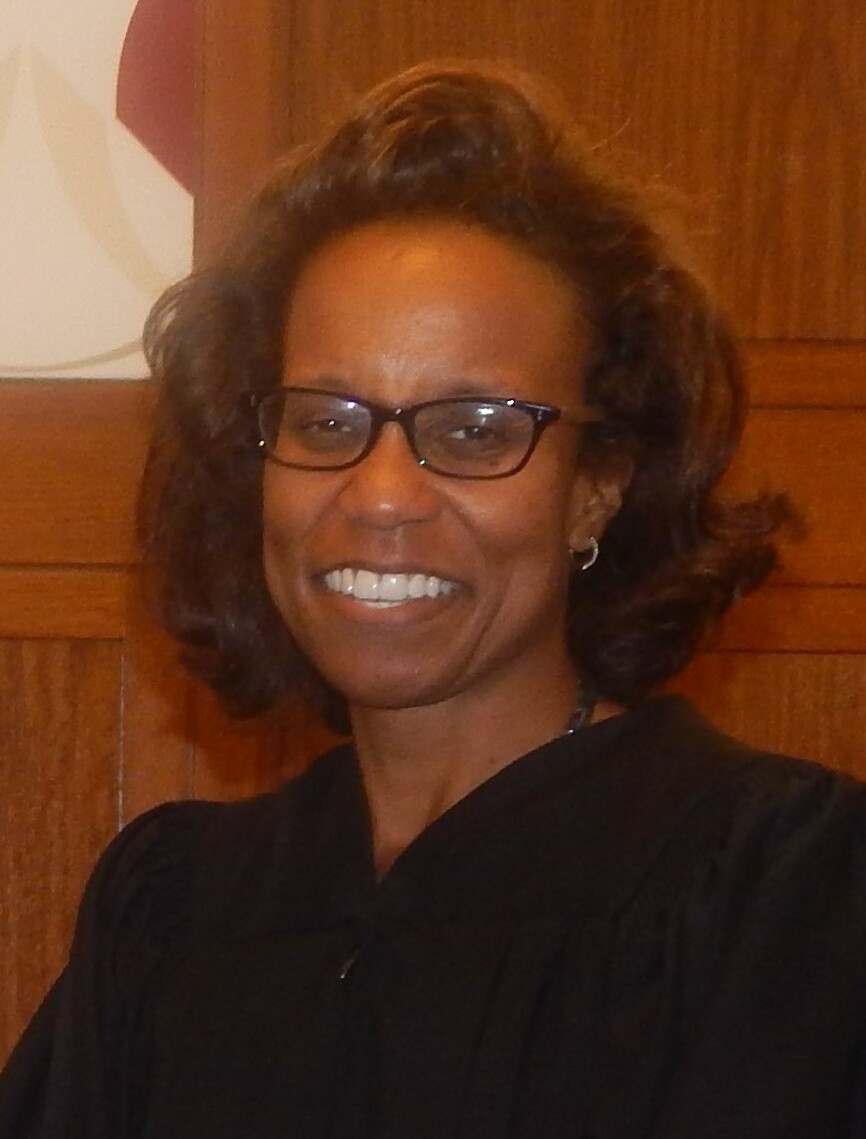

Chief Judge of the United States District Court for the District of Massachusetts
- Incumbent
- Assumed office July 1, 2025
- Preceded by: F. Dennis Saylor IV

Judge of the United States District Court for the District of Massachusetts
- Incumbent
- Assumed office December 20, 2010
- Appointed by: Barack Obama
- Preceded by: Reginald C. Lindsay

Personal details
- Born: Denise Jefferson; 1968 (age 57–58) East Patchogue, New York, U.S.
- Education: Wesleyan University (BA); Harvard University (JD)

Denise Jefferson Casper (born 1968) is an American attorney serving as the chief United States district judge of the United States District Court for the District of Massachusetts. She used to be the Deputy District Attorney for the Middlesex District Attorney's Office in Cambridge, Massachusetts. Casper is the first black female judge to serve on the federal bench in Massachusetts. Casper is also notable for presiding over the criminal trial of Whitey Bulger.

== Early life and education ==
Casper was born in East Patchogue, New York. She received her Bachelor of Arts from Wesleyan University in 1990 and her Juris Doctor from Harvard Law School in 1994.

== Career ==
Casper started her professional career as a law clerk for Edith W. Fine and J. Harold Flannery of the Massachusetts Appeals Court. During the period of 1995 through 1998, she was an attorney with the firm of Bingham McCutchen, where she conducted civil litigation. In 1999, Casper became an Assistant United States Attorney in Boston and was the deputy chief of the Organized Crime Drug Enforcement Task Force starting in 2004. She served as an assistant United States attorney in Boston from 1999 until 2005 and taught legal writing at Boston University School of Law from 2005 through 2007. Casper served as the deputy district attorney for the Middlesex District Attorney’s Office in Cambridge, Massachusetts from 2007 until her confirmation as a federal judge.

=== Federal judicial service ===
Casper was nominated by President Barack Obama on April 28, 2010, to a seat on the United States District Court for the District of Massachusetts vacated by Judge Reginald C. Lindsay. She was confirmed by the United States Senate on December 17, 2010, and received her commission on December 20, 2010. At the time of her appointment, she was the first African-American woman to be a federal judge in Massachusetts and one of the youngest federal judges in the United States.

=== Notable cases ===
In 2013, Casper presided over the trial, conviction, and sentencing of Boston's infamous organized crime boss, Whitey Bulger.

In 2020, Casper was assigned the Equal Means Equal et al. v. David Ferriero case, a lawsuit brought to require the Archivist of the United States to certify the Equal Rights Amendment as part of the U.S. Constitution. On August 6, 2020, Casper ruled that the Plaintiffs did not have standing to sue the Archivist to compel him to ratify the ERA and she therefore could not determine the merits of the case. Casper thereby granted the Defendants' Motion to Dismiss.

In 2026, Casper entered an order preventing the government from requiring proof of U.S. citizenship in order to vote.

== See also ==
- List of African-American federal judges
- List of African-American jurists
- List of first women lawyers and judges in Massachusetts

Legal offices
Preceded by Reginald C. Lindsay	Judge of the United States District Court for the District of Massachusetts; 2010–present	Incumbent
Preceded by F. Dennis Saylor IV	Chief Judge of the United States District Court for the District of Massachusetts; 2025–present	Incumbent
