= Old Harbor Housing Project =

Public housing in Boston, Massachusetts

Coordinates: 42.327°N 71.055°W

The Old Harbor Housing Project, later renamed the Mary Ellen McCormack Project, is a 27-acre housing project opposite Joe Moakley Park in South Boston, Massachusetts.

== History ==
Built in 1936 by the Federal Public Works Administration (PWA) as one of 50 slum clearance and low income housing projects being constructed nationwide. Construction cost $6,000,000, and opened on May 1, 1938. The Old Harbor Village was the first public housing development in New England and it remains one of the largest. It comprises more than 1,000 apartments in 22 three-story buildings and 152 row houses. The complex was renamed after the mother of John W. McCormack, former Speaker of the United States House of Representatives, who championed housing and human rights.

The Project is best known for being the housing project where James "Whitey" Bulger grew up, and a neighborhood "where court-ordered desegregation of schools through busing led to hostility and violence in the 1970s". The housing project itself was under a HUD approved desegregation plan.

As of 2017, the complex has 1,016 subsidized apartments located a short distance from the MBTA subway's Red Line and various MBTA bus routes.

== Renovation proposal ==
In August 2017, the Boston Housing Authority announced a partnership with WinnCompanies on a $1.6 billion redevelopment project that would replace the 1,016 subsidized apartments with 1,365 mixed-income units, adding middle-income/workforce housing and market rate rental units and condominiums to the replacement subsidized units. The proposal also calls for the addition of community space, green space and retail locations, including a supermarket.

== See also ==
- Desegregation busing in the United States
- Old Colony Housing Project
