= J. W. Carney Jr. =

American lawyer

- Education: College of the Holy Cross (BA); Boston College (JD)
- Occupation: lawyer
- Known for: Defense attorney for: Tarek Mehanna; John Salvi; Whitey Bulger
- Website: www.carneydefense.com

Jay W. Carney Jr. is an American criminal defense attorney. He has defended reproductive health clinic shooter John Salvi, Al-Qaeda associate Tarek Mehanna, and mobster Whitey Bulger.

== Career ==
Carney began his legal career in 1978 at the Massachusetts Defenders Committee in Boston for five years, and then served as a prosecutor in Middlesex County for the next five years. He has been in private practice since 1989.
