= David Sutherland Nelson =

American judge (1933–1998)

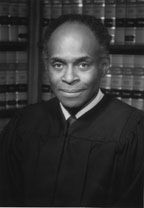

Senior Judge of the United States District Court for the District of Massachusetts
- In office September 27, 1991 – October 21, 1998

Judge of the United States District Court for the District of Massachusetts
- In office March 23, 1979 – September 27, 1991
- Appointed by: Jimmy Carter
- Preceded by: Seat established by 92 Stat. 1629
- Succeeded by: Reginald C. Lindsay

Associate Justice of the Massachusetts Superior Court
- In office 1973–1979
- Appointed by: Francis Sargent

Personal details
- Born: David Sutherland Nelson; December 2, 1933 Boston, Massachusetts
- Died: October 21, 1998 (aged 64) Framingham, Massachusetts
- Education: Boston College (BS, JD)

David Sutherland Nelson (December 2, 1933 – October 21, 1998) was a United States district judge of the United States District Court for the District of Massachusetts.

== Education and career ==
Born in Boston, Massachusetts, Nelson received a Bachelor of Science degree from Boston College in 1957 and a Juris Doctor from Boston College Law School in 1960. He was in private practice in Boston from 1960 to 1973. He was an assistant professor for the Boston University School of Public Communications from 1966 to 1973. He was a United States Commissioner of the United States District Court for the District of Massachusetts from 1968 to 1969. He was an instructor at Harvard Law School from 1969 to 1980, and an instructor in trial advocacy at the Boston University School of Law from 1973 to 1992. He served as an assistant commonwealth attorney general, specifically as Chief of Consumer Protection Division of Massachusetts from 1971 to 1973, and as a justice of the Superior Court of Massachusetts from 1973 to 1979.

== Federal judicial service ==
On January 25, 1979, President Jimmy Carter nominated Nelson to a new seat on the United States District Court for the District of Massachusetts created by 92 Stat. 1629. He was confirmed by the United States Senate on March 21, 1979, and received his commission on March 23, 1979. He was the first African American to be appointed a federal judge in Massachusetts. He assumed senior status due to a certified disability on September 27, 1991, serving in that capacity until his death on October 21, 1998, in Framingham, Massachusetts.

== See also ==
- List of African-American federal judges
- List of African-American jurists

== Sources ==
Legal offices
Preceded by Seat established by 92 Stat. 1629	Judge of the United States District Court for the District of Massachusetts; 1979–1991	Succeeded by Reginald C. Lindsay
