= Reginald C. Lindsay =

American judge

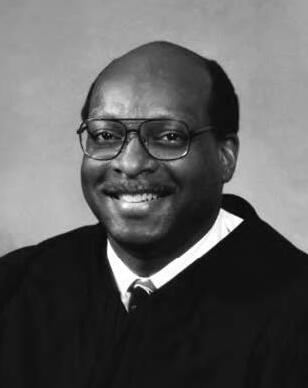

Judge of the United States District Court for the District of Massachusetts
- In office November 24, 1993 – March 12, 2009
- Appointed by: Bill Clinton
- Preceded by: David Sutherland Nelson
- Succeeded by: Denise J. Casper

Personal details
- Born: March 19, 1945 Birmingham, Alabama, U.S.
- Died: March 12, 2009 (aged 63) Boston, Massachusetts, U.S.
- Education: Morehouse College (BA); Harvard University (JD)

Reginald Carl Lindsay (March 19, 1945 – March 12, 2009) was a United States district judge of the United States District Court for the District of Massachusetts.

== Early life and career ==
Born in Birmingham, Alabama, Lindsay received a Bachelor of Arts degree from Morehouse College in 1967 and a Juris Doctor from Harvard Law School in 1970. He was in private practice in Boston, Massachusetts, from 1970 to 1975. He was the Massachusetts state commissioner of public utilities from 1975 to 1977, thereafter returning to his private practice until 1993.

== Federal judicial service ==
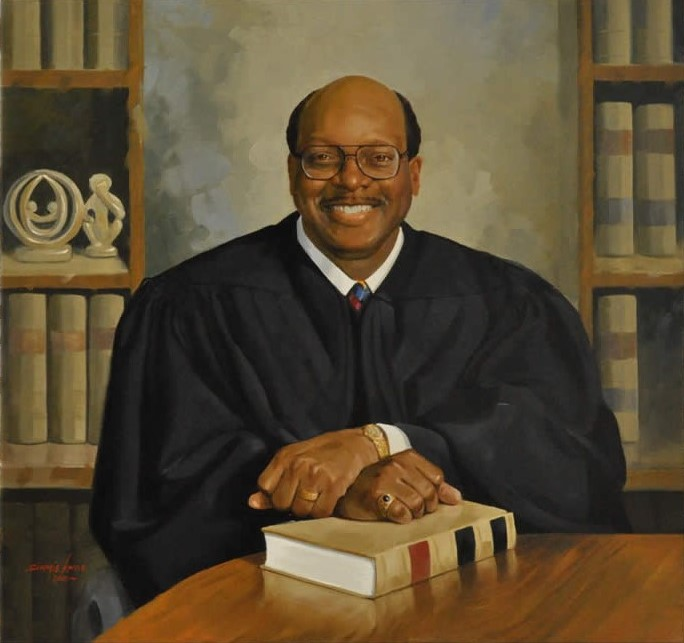
Lindsay's court portrait

On October 27, 1993, Lindsay was nominated by President Bill Clinton to a seat on the United States District Court for the District of Massachusetts vacated by David Sutherland Nelson. Lindsay was confirmed by the United States Senate on November 20, 1993, and received his commission on November 24, 1993. Judge Lindsay took a leave of absence from the bench in April 2008 while recovering from illness and died in Boston on March 12, 2009. He was 63 years old.

== See also ==
- List of African-American federal judges
- List of African-American jurists

Legal offices
Preceded by David Sutherland Nelson	Judge of the United States District Court for the District of Massachusetts; 1993–2009	Succeeded by Denise J. Casper
