= Kevin Weeks =

American mobster (born 1956)

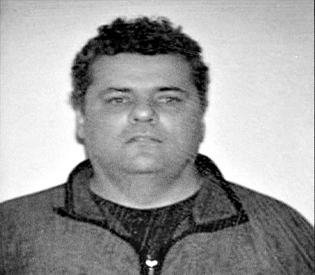
- Weeks' November 17, 1999 DEA mugshot
- Born: March 21, 1956 (age 70); Boston, Massachusetts, U.S.
- Other name: "Weeksie"
- Occupations: Mobster; government witness; writer
- Years active: 1975–1999
- Predecessor: Whitey Bulger
- Spouse: Pamela "Anna" Cavaleri (m. 1980)
- Children: 2
- Status: Released in 2005
- Allegiance: Winter Hill Gang
- Conviction: Racketeering (1999)
- Criminal charge: Racketeering (indicted on 29 counts under the RICO Act)
- Penalty: 6 years imprisonment (2004)

Kevin Weeks (born March 21, 1956) is an American former mobster and longtime friend and mob lieutenant to Whitey Bulger, the infamous boss of the Winter Hill Gang in South Boston, a crime family formerly based in the Winter Hill neighborhood of Somerville, Massachusetts.

After his arrest and imprisonment in 1999, he became a cooperating witness. His testimony is viewed as responsible for the convictions of FBI agent John Connolly, as well as forcing Bulger's right-hand man, Stephen Flemmi, to plead guilty as well. Since his release from prison, he has written the true-crime memoir, Brutal: My Life in Whitey Bulger's Irish Mob. This was followed by Where's Whitey?, a novel using Bulger as a character, co-written with Phyllis Karas. Promotion for the book started on the day the FBI stepped up its efforts to catch Bulger with an advertisement; Bulger was caught two days later.

== Early life ==
Kevin Weeks was born in South Boston, Massachusetts, on March 21, 1956, to a working-class family of Irish and Welsh descent. He was the fifth child in a family of six and grew up in the Old Colony Housing Project at 8 Pilsudski Way, apartment 554. His father, John Weeks Sr., originally hailed from Brooklyn, New York. He changed tires for a living and later obtained a position with the Boston Housing Authority.

Weeks had two brothers, William and John Jr., and three sisters, Maureen, Patricia, and Karen. John Sr. trained his sons in boxing and earned extra money by coaching prizefighters. Kevin first started attending school at Michael J. Perkins, but then changed to John Andrew School in Andrew Square for grades 5 and 6; he finally completed elementary school at Patrick F. Gavin School. He graduated from South Boston High in 1974, ending his formal education. His two brothers graduated from Harvard University and would seek out careers in politics: John Jr. became an advance man for Massachusetts Governor Michael Dukakis, and William became a selectman in Acton, Massachusetts.

Kevin's brother, William, has described their childhood: "Smart was good, but having the ability to beat someone senseless! Now that was real power. Education was often talked about in the apartment, but always with the implied threat that if your marks weren't acceptable, be ready to give up your soul to God because your ass belonged to our father ... and As weren't acceptable."

== Criminal career ==
In 1975, Weeks became a bouncer at a popular neighborhood bar called Triple O's Lounge, owned by Kevin O'Neil. This was a frequent hangout of the Winter Hill Gang, an Irish-American crime family which was then headed by James J. "Whitey" Bulger. It was here that Weeks first met Bulger, as well as Bulger's Italian-American partner Stephen "The Rifleman" Flemmi.

Beginning in 1978, Weeks began working for Bulger part-time as muscle and a personal driver. Impressed by Weeks' knack for making money and genuinely liking him, Bulger decided to bring him in closer than any other associate. Meanwhile, Weeks turned to running a loansharking business on the side.

In 1982, four years after beginning to work as part of the Winter Hill Gang, Weeks left his legitimate job and became a full-time mobster in the gang.

=== The Halloran murder ===
On the night of May 11, 1982, Bulger was told of the whereabouts of a former associate turned federal informant, Brian Halloran, known on the streets as "Balloonhead" owing to the size of his cranium. After arriving at the scene, Weeks staked out Anthony's Pier 4 Restaurant, where Halloran and construction worker Michael Donahue were dining together. As Donahue and Halloran drove out of the parking lot in a blue Datsun, Weeks signaled Bulger by stating, "The balloon is in the air", over a handheld radio. Bulger drove up in a souped-up 1975 Chevrolet Malibu with a masked man armed with a silenced Mac 10 submachine gun; Bulger himself carried a .30 caliber carbine rifle. Bulger and the other shooter, allegedly Pat Nee, opened fire and sprayed Halloran and Donahue's car with bullets. Donahue was shot in the head and killed instantly. After Halloran stumbled out of the car, Bulger continued to shoot him as his writhing body was "bouncing off the ground", according to Weeks.

Afterwards, Weeks calmly drove from the scene, even circling back to collect a hubcap. He then disposed of the guns used in the killings by throwing them into Marine Bay on the instructions of Bulger. Weeks described the murders of Halloran and Donahue as the event which cemented his association with Bulger, saying: "I was involved in a double homicide, so I knew there was no getting out".

=== Mob lieutenant ===
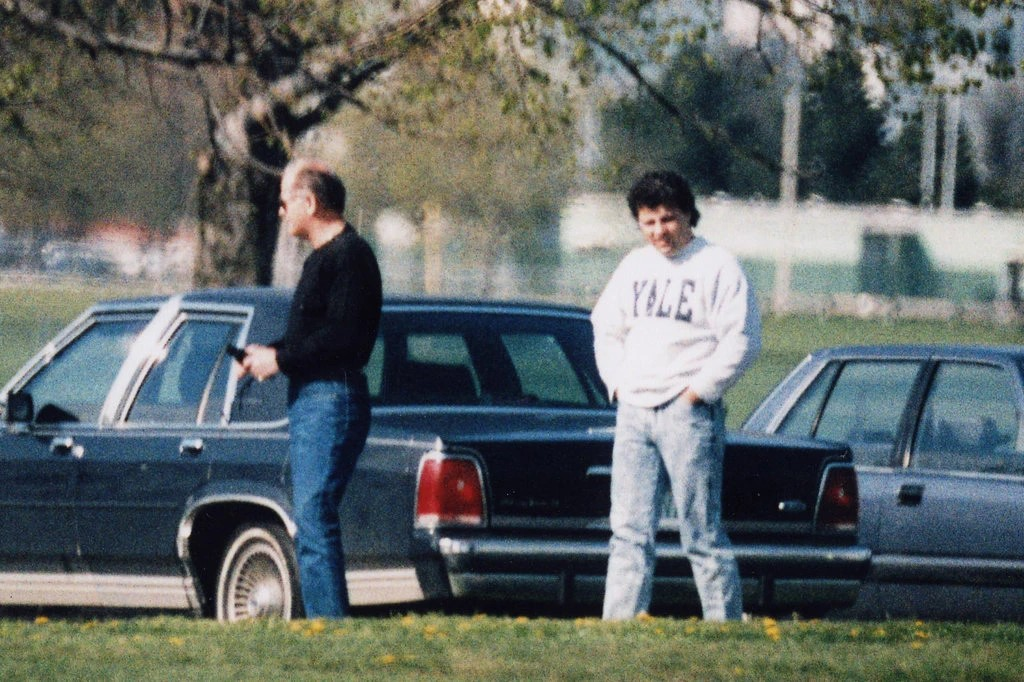
FBI surveillance photo of Weeks (right) with Whitey Bulger (left)

Weeks became a protégé to Bulger, who groomed him as his successor and treated him like a son. During the 1980s, Weeks operated several convenience stores and liquor marts in South Boston that served as fronts for the Winter Hill Gang. He collected payments from loan sharks and bookmakers, insulating Bulger from the transactions, and also helped extort local criminals and businessmen who were behind on their debts to the gang. Weeks said: "Everything I did, every business I had, Jim Bulger and Steve Flemmi were my partners always."

In 1983, Weeks and O'Neil acquired Stippo's Liquor Mart in South Boston from owners Stephen and Julie Rakes by using threats of violence. The store was renamed South Boston Liquor Mart and became a frequent hangout of Bulger and Flemmi. In 1998, Stephen "Stippo" Rakes was convicted of perjury and obstruction of justice for telling grand juries that the sale of the liquor store was voluntary.

In order to avoid electronic eavesdropping, Weeks, Bulger and Flemmi discussed business during long walks in public places including Castle Island, a circular path in South Boston known as the Sugar Bowl, and Columbia Park, which was adjacent to the liquor store which served as one of Bulger's offices.

Weeks was an accomplice in the murders of Deborah Hussey, Arthur “Bucky" Barrett, and John McIntyre.

After drawing the ire of Bulger, the Boston Herald reporter Howie Carr was allegedly targeted for assassination by the Winter Hill Gang. Weeks claims to have been involved in a murder plot against Carr, positioning himself with a sniper rifle in a cemetery adjacent to Carr's home. According to Weeks, he "passed" on killing Carr when the reporter emerged from his house with his young daughter accompanying him.

=== Narcotics ===
Bulger, Weeks, and Flemmi became heavily involved in narcotics trafficking in the early 1980s. Bulger began to summon drug dealers from in and around Boston to his headquarters. Flanked by Kevin Weeks and Flemmi, he would inform each dealer that he had been offered a substantial sum to assassinate them. He would then demand a large cash payment not to do so.

Eventually, however, the massive profits of drugs proved irresistible. According to Kevin Weeks:

Jimmy, Stevie and I weren't in the import business and weren't bringing in the marijuana or the cocaine. We were in the shakedown business. We didn't bring drugs in; we took money off the people who did. We never dealt with the street dealers, but rather with a dozen large-scale drug distributors all over the State who were bringing in the coke and marijuana and paying hundreds of thousands to Jimmy. The dealers on the street corner sold eight-balls, ...grams, and half grams to customers for their personal use. They were supplied by the mid level drug dealer who was selling them multiple ounces. In other words, the big importers gave it to the major distributors, who sold it to the middlemen, who then sold it to the street dealers. To get to Jimmy, Stevie, and me, someone would have had to go through those four layers of insulation.

In South Boston, most of the neighborhood's drug trade was managed by a handpicked crew of prize fighters led by John "Red" Shea. Edward MacKenzie Jr., a former member of Shea's crew, has stated that this was done because Shea viewed athletes as less likely to abuse the drugs they were selling.

According to Weeks, Bulger enforced strict rules over the dealers who were paying him protection.

The only people we ever put out of business were heroin dealers. Jimmy didn't allow heroin in South Boston. It was a dirty drug that users stuck in their arms, making problems with needles, and later on, AIDS. While people can do cocaine socially and still function, once they do heroin, they're zombies.

Weeks also insists that Bulger strictly forbade PCP and selling to children, and that those dealers who refused to play by his rules were violently driven out of the neighborhood.

In 1990, Shea and his associates were arrested as part of a joint investigation involving the Drug Enforcement Administration (DEA), the Boston Police Department and the Massachusetts State Police. All refused to testify against Bulger, Flemmi, and Weeks. According to Weeks,

Of course, Jimmy lost money once the drug dealers were removed from the streets in the summer raid, but he always had other business going on. Knowing I had to build something on the side, I had concentrated on my shylocking and gambling businesses. The drug business had been good while it lasted. But our major involvement in it was over.

=== Mob boss ===
Bulger became a fugitive after he was indicted on racketeering charges in January 1995, and Weeks subsequently acted as "operational chief" of the Winter Hill Gang, taking orders from Bulger via frequent telephone calls. Weeks funded Bulger by funnelling thousands of dollars into his bank account. Weeks also had several clandestine meetings in New York City and Chicago.

In 1997, shortly after The Boston Globe disclosed that Bulger and Flemmi had been informants, Weeks met with retired agent John Connolly (later sentenced to 40 years in prison), who showed him a photocopy of Bulger's FBI informant file. In order to explain Bulger and Flemmi's status as informants, Connolly said, "The Mafia was going against Jimmy and Stevie, so Jimmy and Stevie went against them." According to Weeks:

As I read over the files at the Top of the Hub that night, Connolly kept telling me that 90 percent of the information in the files came from Stevie. Certainly Jimmy hadn't been around the Mafia the way Stevie had. But, Connolly told me, he had to put Jimmy's name on the files to keep his file active. As long as Jimmy was an active informant, Connolly said, he could justify meeting with Jimmy and giving him valuable information. Even after he retired, Connolly still had friends in the FBI, and he and Jimmy kept meeting to let each other know what was going on. I listened to all that, but now I understood that even though he was retired, Connolly was still getting information, as well as money, from Jimmy. As I continued to read, I could see that a lot of the reports were not just against the Italians. There were more and more names of Polish and Irish guys, of people we had done business with, of friends of mine. Whenever I came across the name of someone I knew, I would read exactly what it said about that person. I would see, over and over again, that some of these people had been arrested for crimes that were mentioned in these reports. It didn't take long for me to realize that it had been bullshit when Connolly told me that the files hadn't been disseminated, that they had been for his own personal use. He had been an employee of the FBI. He hadn't worked for himself. If there was some investigation going on and his supervisor said, 'Let me take a look at that,' what was Connolly going to do? He had to give it up. And he obviously had. I thought about what Jimmy had always said, 'You can lie to your wife and to your girlfriends, but not to your friends. Not to anyone we're in business with.' Maybe Jimmy and Stevie hadn't lied to me. But they sure hadn't been telling me everything.

=== Arrest ===
On November 17, 1999, Weeks, O'Neil, and other Winter Hill associates were arrested in South Boston by agents of the DEA, the Massachusetts State Police and the Internal Revenue Service (IRS). The next afternoon, he was presented with a 29-count indictment under the Racketeer Influenced and Corrupt Organizations Act (RICO), which alleged extortion, money laundering and drug trafficking. A 79-page affidavit by state police Lieutenant Thomas Duffy provided a broad outline of the activities of the Winter Hill Gang and listed various criminal acts committed by Weeks. The charges carried a potential sentence of life imprisonment. At first refusing to cooperate, Weeks was transferred to a Federal penitentiary in Rhode Island.

== Government witness ==
Imprisoned in Rhode Island, it took about two weeks for Weeks to decide to co-operate with authorities, leading some in South Boston to dub him "Kevin Squeaks" or "Two Weeks". Weeks stated that he was approached by one of his fellow prisoners, a "made man" in the New England crime family, who made a surprising suggestion: he should testify against Bulger and Flemmi. As the mafioso put it, "Remember, you can't rat on a rat. Those guys have been giving up everyone for thirty years."

He was also unnerved when two lawyers told him his chances at trial were dismal. Prosecutors were outraged at Winter Hill's crime spree, and were also frustrated when IRA sleeper associate James "Gentleman Jim" Mulvey refused to flip. Weeks recalled that his attorneys told him that prosecutors wanted to take their anger out on Weeks and press for the maximum if he were convicted—which would have all but assured he would die in prison. In addition, Weeks was also deeply impressed by the cooperation of John Martorano, a legendary enforcer for the Winter Hill Gang.

Weeks negotiated a plea deal with federal prosecutors in 1999. He confessed to being an accessory to five murders. In 2000, Weeks led authorities to six different bodies buried by the Winter Hill Gang, including the triple grave of Hussey, McIntyre and Barrett, as well as a cache of weapons in Flemmi's home in South Boston. He implicated Bulger in the murder of Brian Halloran (nicknamed "Balloonhead" by Bulger), helped solve the 1981 contract killing of businessman Roger Wheeler, and agreed to testify against Flemmi and Bulger. He also revealed that Whitey's younger brothers, Senate President Billy Bulger and juvenile magistrate clerk Jackie Bulger, had talked with Whitey while he was on the lam. According to Weeks, Jackie had even helped Whitey get a fake ID which Weeks delivered to Whitey during a rendezvous in Chicago.

Jackie was sentenced to six months in federal prison for lying to a grand jury about his actions, while Billy was forced to resign as president of the University of Massachusetts. Weeks also testified against two of Bulger's friends in law enforcement; FBI Special Agent John Connolly and Lieutenant Richard J. Schneiderhan of the Massachusetts State Police. Weeks' cooperation was critical in the conviction of Connolly. On March 22, 2004, Weeks was sentenced to six years in federal prison, including time served.

== Family ==
Kevin Weeks married his longtime girlfriend, Pamela Cavaleri (born 1957), on April 26, 1980 at the Gate of Heaven Roman Catholic Church in their native South Boston. They have two sons.

== Current status ==
Weeks was released from Federal prison in early 2005. He collaborated with journalist Phyllis Karas (of People magazine) to write Brutal: The Untold Story of My Life Inside Whitey Bulger's Irish Mob, Weeks's account of his life with Bulger and Flemmi, which was published in March 2006. The profits from the book were partially used to compensate victims as part of a civil suit against Weeks. At the time of the book's release, Weeks was interviewed by correspondent Ed Bradley on 60 Minutes.

At a book signing in April 2006, Kevin Weeks told the crowd at a Boston Barnes & Noble that he once intended to return to being a gangster once he was released from prison. "Now I can't," he quipped, "Everybody knows my face."

He was a star witness at Connolly's 2008 trial on state charges of murdering former World Jai Alai president Roger Wheeler, as well as at Bulger's 2013 trial on racketeering charges two years after Bulger was finally captured. At the latter trial, Bulger lost his composure when Weeks called him a rat and the two former colleagues came to blows.

In 2012, Weeks was interviewed by Kurt Sutter on the Discovery Channel's Outlaw Empires.

Weeks' third book, Hunted Down: The FBI's Pursuit and Capture of Whitey Bulger, was released on July 22, 2015.

== In popular culture ==
Actor Jesse Plemons portrayed Weeks in the 2015 film Black Mass.

== Books ==
- Weeks, Kevin; Karas, Phyllis, Brutal: The Untold Story of My Life Inside Whitey Bulger's Irish Mob, William Morrow Paperbacks; Reprint edition (March 13, 2007). ISBN 978-0061148064
- Weeks, Kevin; Karas, Phyllis, Where's Whitey?, Tonto Books, October 15, 2010. ISBN 978-1907183164
- Weeks, Kevin; Karas, Phyllis, Hunted Down: The FBI's Pursuit and Capture of Whitey Bulger, Fracas Press, July 22, 2015. ISBN 9780986216404
