= Rising Sun =

Rising sun may refer to sunrise.

Rising Sun or The Rising Sun may also refer to:

== Books ==
- Rising Sun (Crichton novel), a 1992 Michael Crichton novel
- The Rising Sun, Pulitzer Prize winning account by John Toland
- Rising Sun (Conroy novel), a 2012 alternate history war novel by Robert Conroy
- Rising Sun (manga), a 2012 manga series by Satoshi Fujiwara

== Film and television ==
=== Film titles ===
- Rising Sun (1993 film), a film based on the Michael Crichton novel
- Rising Sun (1980 film), a Hong Kong documentary film

=== Others ===
- Rising Sun Films, an Indian production company based in Mumbai
- Rising Sun International Film Festival, an annual film festival held in Kitakyushu, Japan
- Rising Sun Pictures, an Australian visual effects company
- Toonami Rising Sun, a Saturday version of Toonami, a former action cartoon block on Cartoon Network (2000-2001)

== Games ==
- Rising Sun (board game), a miniature wargame
- Rising Sun (video game), a 2000 World War II computer wargame by TalonSoft
- Medal of Honor: Rising Sun, a 2003 World War II video game by EA Games

== Music ==
- Rising Sun Rock Festival, an annual festival in Otaru, Japan

=== Albums ===
- Rising Sun (Aly & Fila album) (2010)
- Rising Sun (Augustus Pablo album) (1986)
- Rising Sun (Stray from the Path album) (2011)
- Rising Sun (TVXQ album) (2005)

=== Songs ===
- "Rising Sun", charting single for Medicine Head Number 11 – 1973
- "Rising Sun" (Fats Domino song)
- "Rising Sun", a song from the album Brainwashed by George Harrison
- "Rising Sun", a song from the album East by Cold Chisel

== Places ==
=== United States ===
- Rising Sun-Lebanon, Delaware
- Rising Sun, Pope County, Illinois, an unincorporated community
- Rising Sun, White County, Illinois, an unincorporated community
- Rising Sun, Indiana, a city
- Rising Sun, Maryland, a town
- Rising Sun, Mississippi, an unincorporated community
- Rising Sun (Montana), a wayside area
- Rising Sun, Wisconsin, an unincorporated community
- Rising Sun Auto Camp, Glacier National Park, Montana, on the National Register of Historic Places

=== United Kingdom ===
- Rising Sun, Cornwall, a hamlet

== Pubs ==
=== Australia ===
- The Rising Sun, historic pub in Kensington, Adelaide, South Australia
- Rising Sun Inn, Millfield, a heritage-listed former post office, inn, general store and residence, Millfield, New South Wales

=== UK ===
- Rising Sun, Carter Lane, London, a Grade II listed public house
- Rising Sun, Cloth Fair, London, a historic pub
- Rising Sun, Euston, London, a Grade II listed public house
- Rising Sun, Fitzrovia, London, a Grade II listed public house
- Rising Sun, Mill Hill, London, a Grade II listed public house

=== US ===
- Rising Sun Inn, Anne Arundel County, Maryland
- Rising Sun Tavern: Various taverns so named (which see)

== Schools ==
- Rising Sun High School (Maryland), North East, Maryland
- Rising Sun High School (Indiana), Rising Sun, Indiana

== Other uses ==
- Rising Sun badge, Australian Army badge
- Rising Sun (character), a comic book character and Japanese superhero from DC Comics
- Rising Sun (sculpture), a work by Adolph Alexander Weinman for the 1915 international exposition of San Francisco
- Rising Sun (yacht), owned by David Geffen
- Operation Rising Sun, a 1970s Cold War military intelligence program run by the Pakistani Directorate of Inter-Services Intelligence
- Order of the Rising Sun, a Japanese honor
- Cagayan Rising Suns, a Philippines Basketball Association Developmental League team

== See also ==
- Camp Rising Sun (New York), an international summer scholarship programme
- Camp Rising Sun (Connecticut), a camp for students with cancer
- The House of the Rising Sun (disambiguation)
- Land of the Rising Sun (disambiguation), primarily referring to Japan
- Rising Son (disambiguation)
- PS Rising Star, a 1818 ship
- Rising Sun Flag, a Japanese flag
- Risingsun, Ohio, a village
- Sun-rising (hieroglyph), of Ancient Egyptian
- Rising sun lemma
