= Rising Sun Tavern =

Rising Sun Tavern is any of the following historical taverns. All of them were roadhouses (stops for travelers and their horses) in the 18th and 19th centuries:

- The Rising Sun Tavern (North Haven, Connecticut), a roadhouse circa 1760 to circa 1860, now a private home
- The Rising Sun Tavern (Philadelphia), long a landmark on the Old York Road, no longer extant (Old York Road § Rising Sun Tavern (Philadelphia))
- The Rising Sun Tavern (Fredericksburg, Virginia), known in the 18th century as the Golden Eagle, now a historical interpretation site for visitors
- The Rising Sun Tavern, established circa 1720, at the place that later became named after it, Rising Sun, Maryland
- The Rising Sun Tavern, established circa 1792, and the small village formerly around it and named after it, which was formerly adjacent to (and later part of) Gap, Pennsylvania
- The Rising Sun Tavern, also Howard's Half-Way House or Howard's Inn, established circa 1765, in Kings County, New York in what today is the Brooklyn neighborhood of New Lots. The building stood at the intersection of the Bedford and Jamaica Turnpikes (now the corner of Broadway and Jamaica Avenue), major routes on Long Island about half-way between the villages of Brooklyn to the west and Jamaica in the east. It was demolished sometime after 1900.

== See also ==
- The House of the Rising Sun, a traditional folk song with a thematic element of a public house called the Rising Sun ("Lomax also noted that 'Rising Sun' was the name of a bawdy house in two traditional English songs, and a name for English pubs")
- Rising Sun § Pubs
- Pub names → Heraldry → Rising Sun as a pub name
- Rising Sun Inn
