= Pub names in Great Britain =

Identification method of public houses

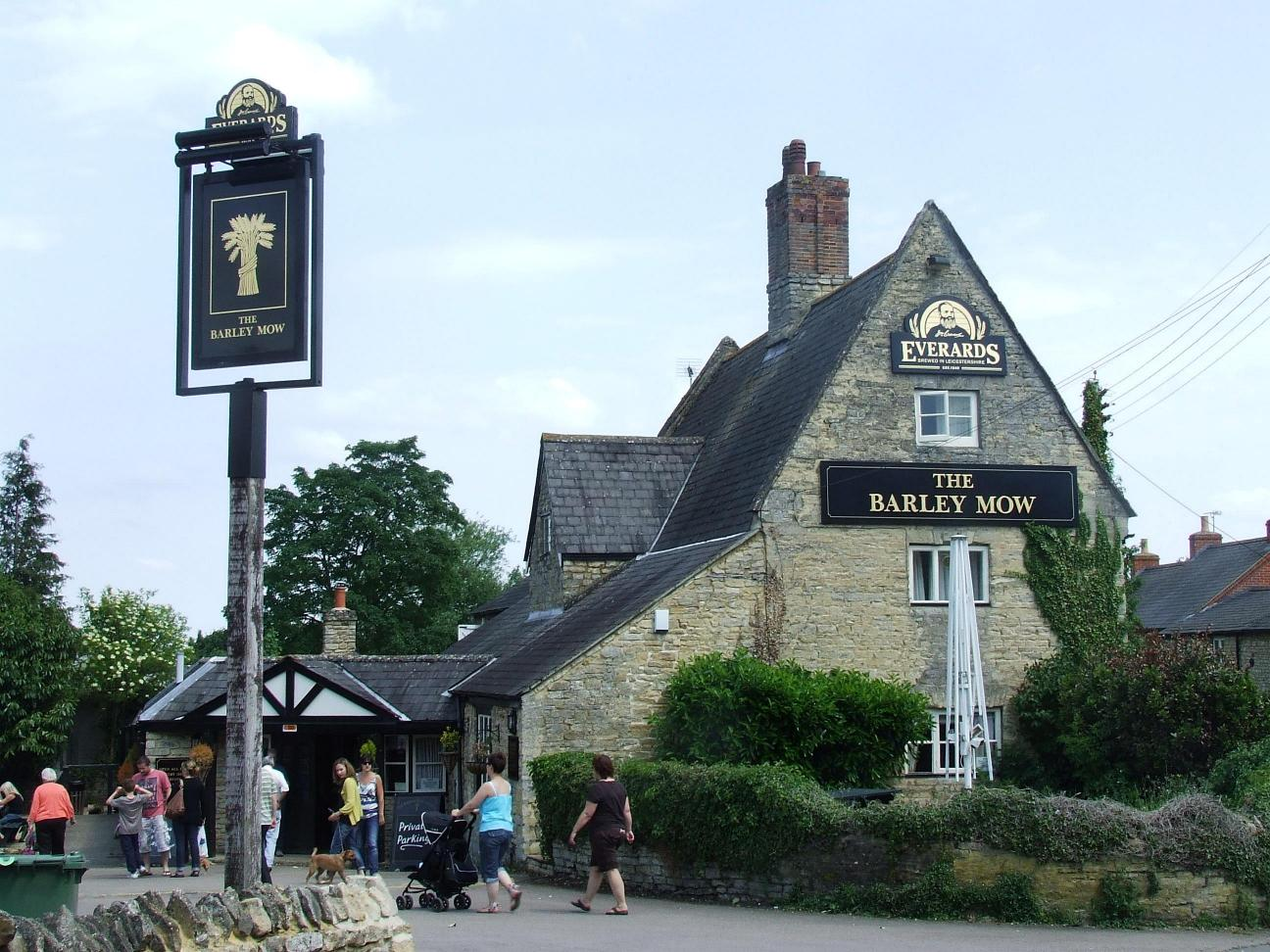
The name of the Barley Mow recalls a sheaf of barley, the principal grain from which beer is made.

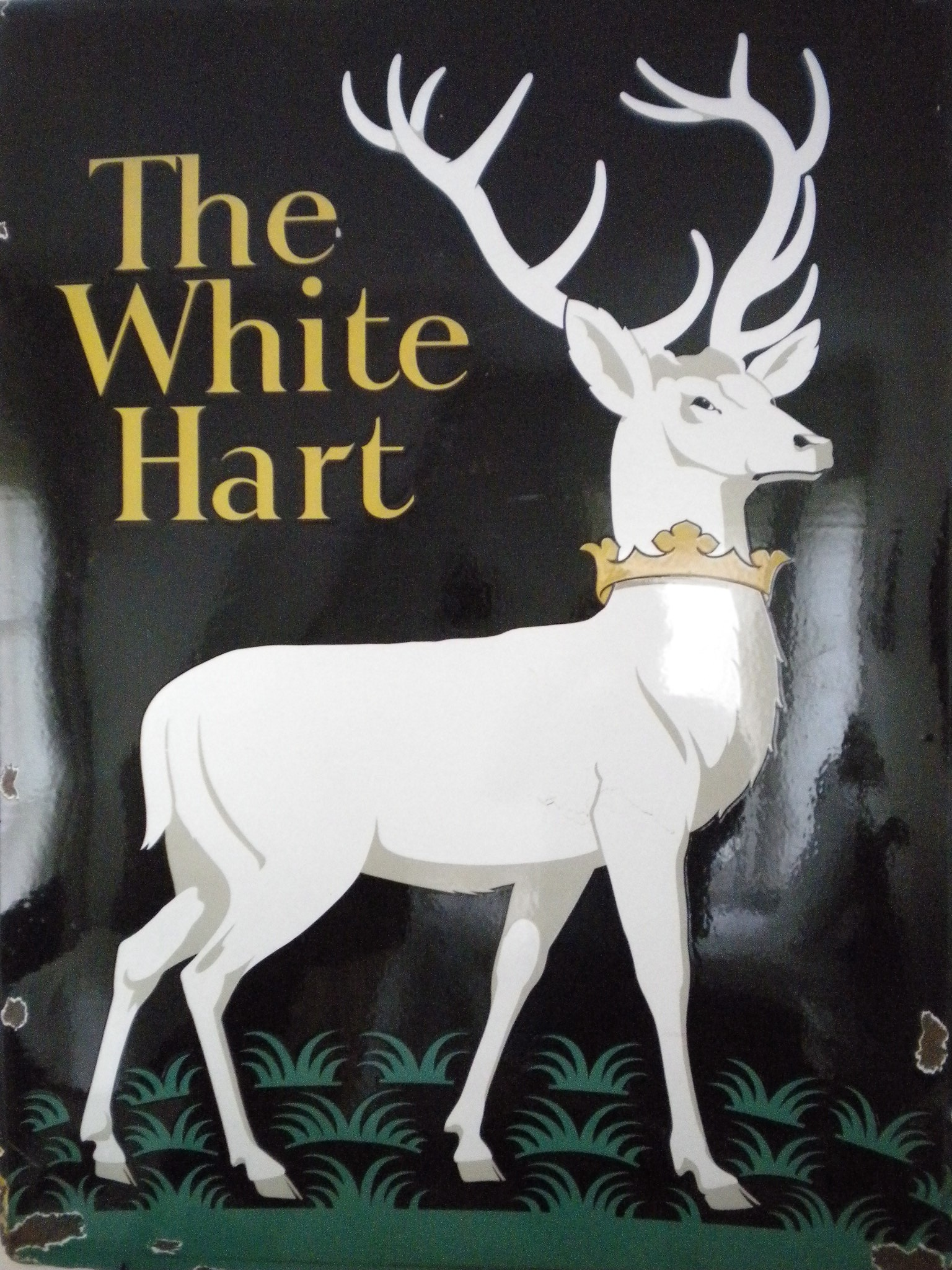
A White Hart pub sign: a white hart was the badge of King Richard II and several noblemen.

Pub names in Great Britain identify traditional drinking establishments. Many pubs are centuries old, from a time when most customers were illiterate but could recognise pub signs or symbolic objects, such as a boot hung outside. Names may be for anything from everyday items to sovereigns and landowners, often represented through coats of arms. Some reflect historic events, occupations, sports, and craftsmen' guilds. Others are rooted in myths and legends, such as the Green Man or local stories like the Moonrakers of Wiltshire.

Names may straightforwardly describe their building or the services offered in addition to serving beer. Several refer to stages in growing barley and in brewing or transporting beer, such as John Barleycorn, the Hop Pole, the Malt Shovel, the Mash Tun, and the Three Barrels. Establishments that served wine might use names like the Spread Eagle, indicating the coat of arms of Germany. Sporting associations appear in names such as the Hare and Hounds or the Bowling Green. Some pub names are literary, referring to books such as Uncle Tom's Cabin or The Hobbit, fictional characters like Sherlock Holmes, or authors including Edgar Wallace.

Many old pubs are named for famous figures or ordinary trades. Several have names intended to be humorous, including the names used by some pub chains. Among the most common pub names are the Red Lion, the Royal Oak, the Crown, and the Swan. Closed pubs are marked †.

== Heraldry ==
=== Badges ===
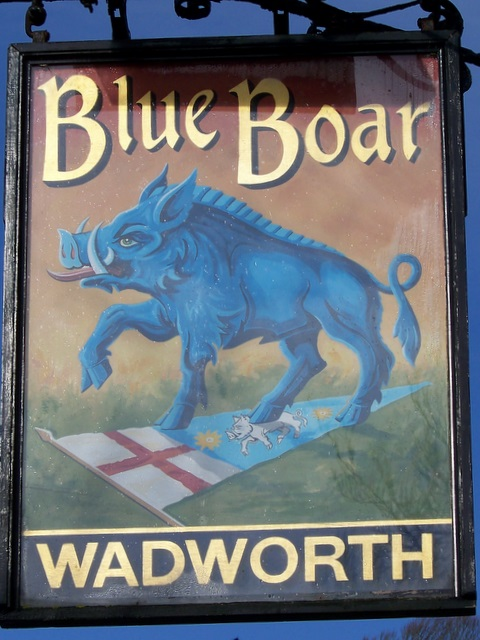
The Blue Boar was the badge of the Earls of Oxford.

Many pubs have heraldic names, often directly naming the animal or object used as a badge or heraldic charge. Among the most common, both in heraldry and on pub signs, is the Red Lion. (Note: Both "Red Lion" and "Red Lion Inn" are used by multiple pubs.) As a pub sign, it probably has multiple origins: in the arms or crest of a local landowner; as the personal badge of John of Gaunt, founder of the House of Lancaster; or in the royal arms of Scotland, conjoined to the arms of England after the Stuart succession in 1603. The White Hart was the livery badge of King Richard II of England; it became so popular as an inn sign during his reign that it was adopted by many later inns and taverns. The Blue Boar, the name of many pubs in Westminster, Norwich, Billericay, Maldon, Witney and elsewhere, was the badge of the Earls of Oxford. The White Boar on the other hand was the badge of King Richard III, while the White Horse was for the Hanoverian Kings. King Edward III's badge was the Rising Sun, the name of several pubs and taverns, (Note: There are pubs called the "Rising Sun" and "Rising Sun Tavern".) while the Red Dragon denotes Wales. The Eagle and Child, Oxford, its name derived from the arms of the Earls of Derby, was a meeting place of the Inklings; the name was in 2005 shared by 25 other pubs.

=== Arms ===
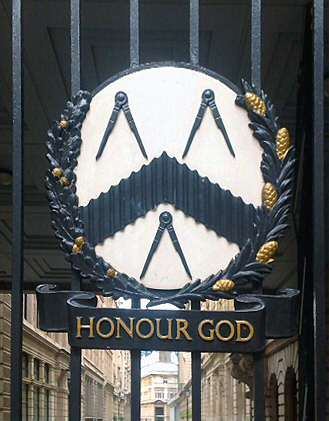
The Worshipful Company of Carpenters' emblem, three compasses

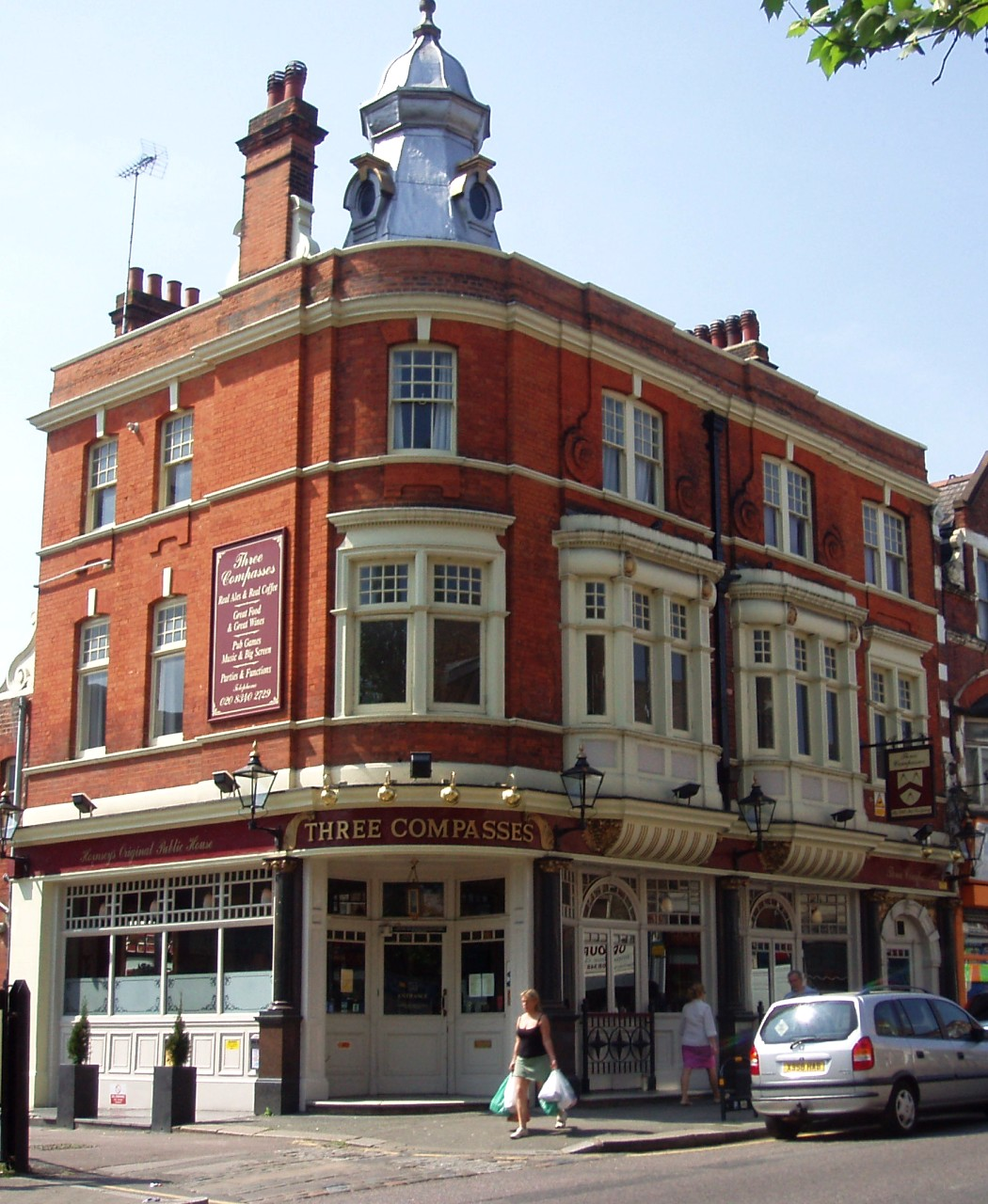
The Three Compasses pub, Hornsey, London N8

Names starting with the word "Three" are often based on the arms of a London Livery company or trade guild. Thus the Three Compasses is named for the Worshipful Company of Carpenters. Sometimes the livery company or guild is named directly, as in the Blacksmiths Arms, Bricklayers Arms, Carpenters Arms, Masons Arms, and Saddlers Arms; people in these trades often met in these places. Another old profession recorded in a pub name is the Drover's Inn, Loch Lomond, Scotland, named after the cattle drovers.

== History, myth and legend ==
Many pub names record aspects of history, real or imagined, from specific events to local legends.

=== Historic events ===
Several historic events are commemorated in pub names. A few of these, such as the Royal Oak, are extremely common. One or two events, like the Battle of Trafalgar, have resulted in multiple different pub names.

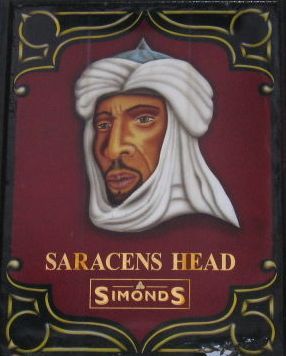
The sign of the Saracen's Head in Broad Street, Bath, Somerset recalls the crusades.

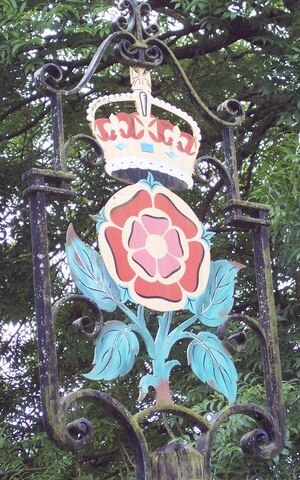
Sign for the Rose and Crown shows the combined red-and-white Tudor rose, marking the end of the Wars of the Roses.

Events commemorated in pub names
Date	Event	Pub name, with examples
1095–1291	Crusades	Saracen's Head, Turk's Head
1133–1855	Bartholomew Fair	Hand and Shears: tailors would gather in the pub the night before the fair and wave their shears announcing that the fair should begin
1215	Magna Carta	Magna Charta, Lowdham, Nottinghamshire
1485	Wars of the Roses	Rose and Crown: Edward III used a golden rose as a personal badge, and two of his sons adapted it by changing the colour: John of Gaunt, 1st Duke of Lancaster, used a red rose, and Edmund of Langley, 1st Duke of York, used a white rose. In 1485, at the Battle of Bosworth Field, Henry Tudor, a descendant of Lancaster, defeated Richard III of the York dynasty and married Richard's niece Elizabeth of York. Since then, the combined red-and-white Tudor rose, often crowned, has been a symbol of the monarchy of England.
1651	Escape of Prince Charles in the English Civil War	As many as 467 pubs named Royal Oak; the prince hid in the Boscobel Oak.
1759	Battle of Minden	The Battle of Minden, Portsmouth, Hampshire †
1805	Battle of Trafalgar	The Trafalgar, Wimbledon Chase. The area once had several pubs whose names recalled the battle, its victor Horatio Nelson, 1st Viscount Nelson (the Nelson Arms), his ship HMS Victory, and his mistress Emma Hamilton: she and Nelson had a house at Merton Place. All are now closed except the Kiss Me Hardy in Colliers Wood.
1815	Battle of Waterloo	Waterloo Inn, Biggin-by-Hartington among others
1826	Siege of Bharatpur	Bhurtpore Inn, Aston, Cheshire. The Inn is on land that was part of the estates of Lord Combermere, commander of British forces during the siege.
1936	Abdication of Edward VIII	The Abdication, Arnold, Nottinghamshire
1969	First human moon landing	Man on the Moon, Northfield, Birmingham: originally called The Man in the Moon and renamed on the day of the first Moon landing

=== Religion ===
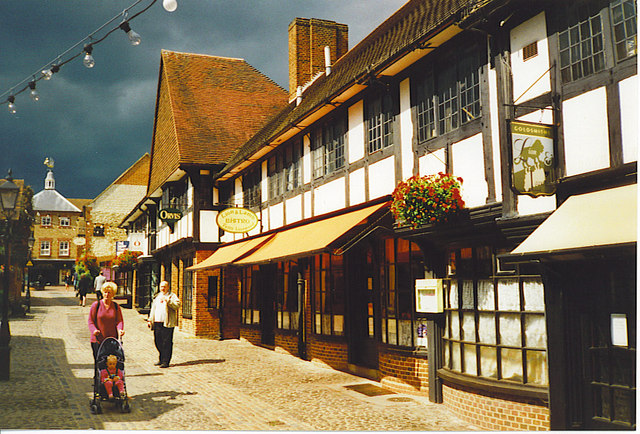
Lion and Lamb, Farnham, Surrey

The amount of religious symbolism in pub names decreased after Henry VIII's break from the church of Rome. For instance, many pubs originally called the Pope's Head were renamed to the less contentious King's Head. Publicans sometimes changed the names of their premises to something close to the original Catholic meaning, so the St Peter could be renamed to the Crossed Keys (that the saint holds, to the gates of heaven), or the Ark could be called the Ship.

Among the surviving religious references, the Lion and Lamb, Pennington, Hampshire, is named from St Augustine's usage, where the lion represents the resurrection of Christ, and the lamb denotes Christ's sacrifice. The Shaven Crown, at Shipton-under-Wychwood, once belonged to the monks of Bruern Abbey. The Cardinal's Hat, Harleston, Norfolk was an inn from at least 1591.

=== Myths and legends ===
Several pub names commemorate English myths and legends.

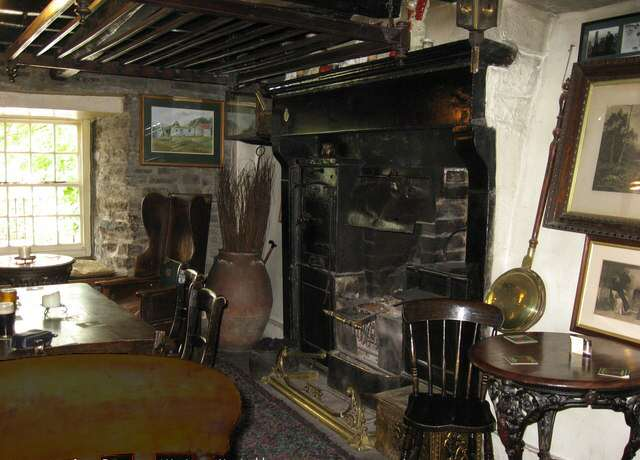
Interior of the Green Dragon Inn, Hardraw, North Yorkshire

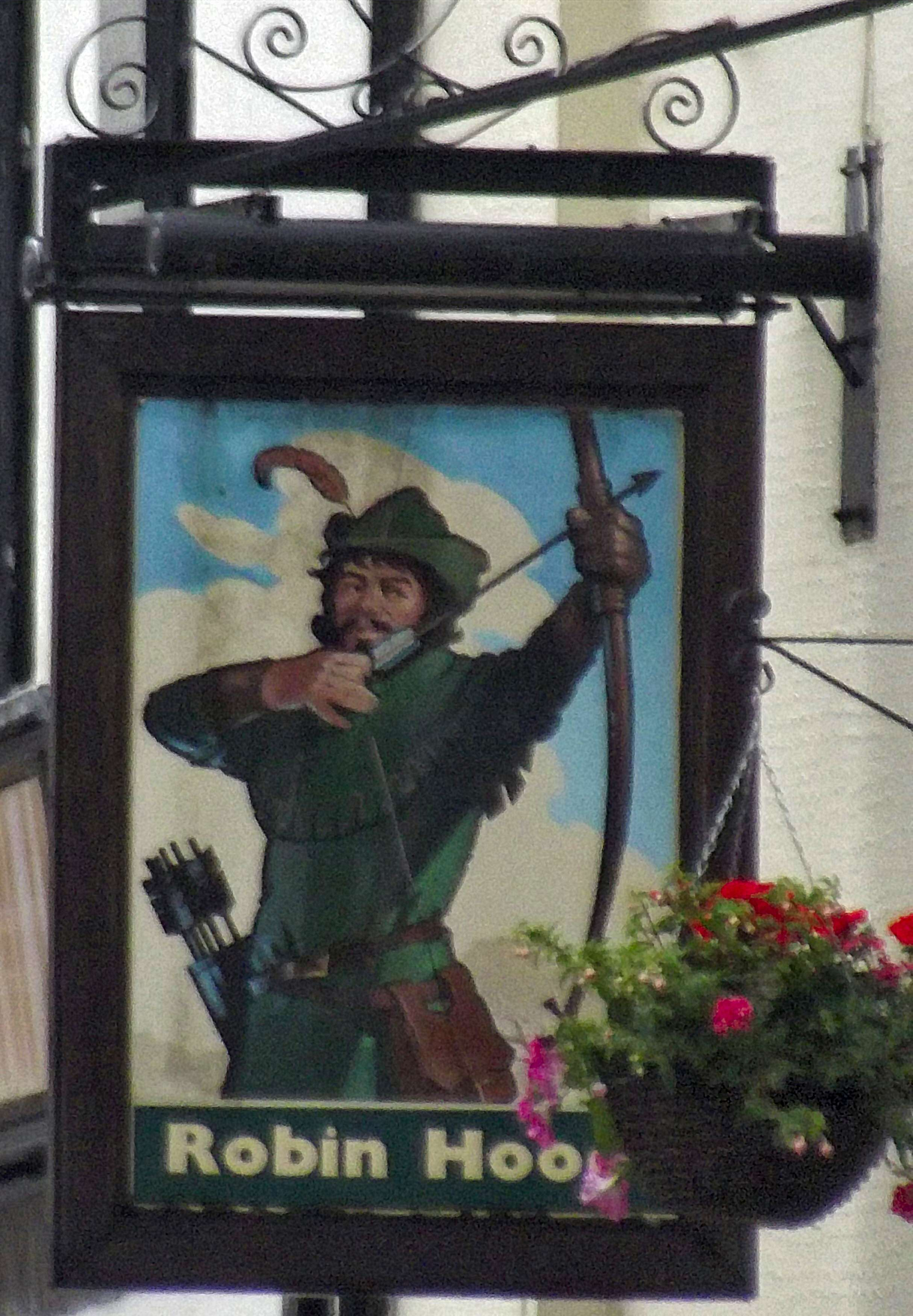
The many Robin Hood pubs recall the legendary outlaw of Sherwood Forest.

Pubs named for myths and legends
Pub	Origins
Black Bess	Several pubs, usually named after the legendary overnight ride from London to York in 1737 by Dick Turpin on his mare, Black Bess.
Brazen George Inn, Cambridge †	Named after England's patron saint, St. George.
The Bucket of Blood, Hayle, Cornwall	Owned by St Austell Brewery; named after a supposed incident where the landlord brought up a bucket of blood from the building's well, as a murdered smuggler had been dropped there.
Fiddler's Green	Fiddler's Green is a legendary place in the afterlife where existence consists of all leisure and no work; in the 19th century, specifically for sailors.
George and Dragon	Over 100 pubs (as of 2025), named for St George, patron saint of England, and his conflict with a dragon.
Green Dragon	Several pubs, named for dragons.
Green Man	A name used for many pubs, from folklore of the Green Man and the image of the Wild Man.
Moonrakers	A Wiltshire folk story holds that Moonrakers comes from the time when smuggling was common in the region.
Robin Hood	Several pubs named for Robin Hood, the lawless anti-hero of Sherwood Forest in Nottinghamshire
Silent Woman, Quiet Lady or Headless Woman	Of uncertain origin, with various local stories, such as a landlady whose tongue was cut out by smugglers so she couldn't talk to the authorities, or a saint beheaded for her Christianity. The pub signs sometimes have an image of a decapitated woman or the couplet: "Here is a woman who has lost her head / She's quiet now—you see she's dead".

=== Historic opinions ===
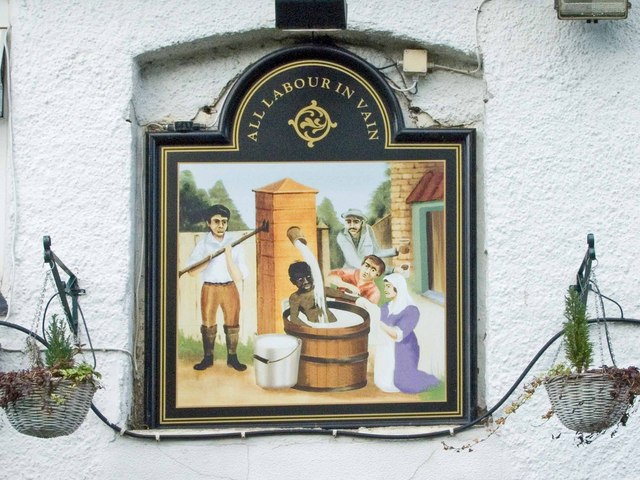
"All Labour in Vain" pub † sign, Horsehay, Shropshire, 2008

All Labour In Vain or Labour In Vain is a pub name probably of Biblical origins. The name was formerly often illustrated by a person trying to scrub the blackness off a black child. Such signs have been mostly replaced with more innocuous depictions of wasted effort. There are numerous old pubs and inns in England named The Black Boy(s), many now claimed to refer either to child chimneysweeps or coal miners, or to a (genuine) historic description of King Charles II. The Black Boy Inn in Caernarfon, North Wales, has received at least a dozen complaints from visitors over the name, which dates back at least 250 years. In 2021 brewer Greene King changed the names of three pubs called The Black Boy, and another called The Black's Head. The Black Bitch, a pub in Linlithgow, West Lothian, is named after the local legend of a black greyhound who is said to have repeatedly swum to an island in the town's loch to bring food to its imprisoned master, only to suffer the same fate when its efforts were discovered. The pub's name has caused more than a few surprised tourists to question the name or decry it as racist.

== The pub itself ==
=== The pub building ===
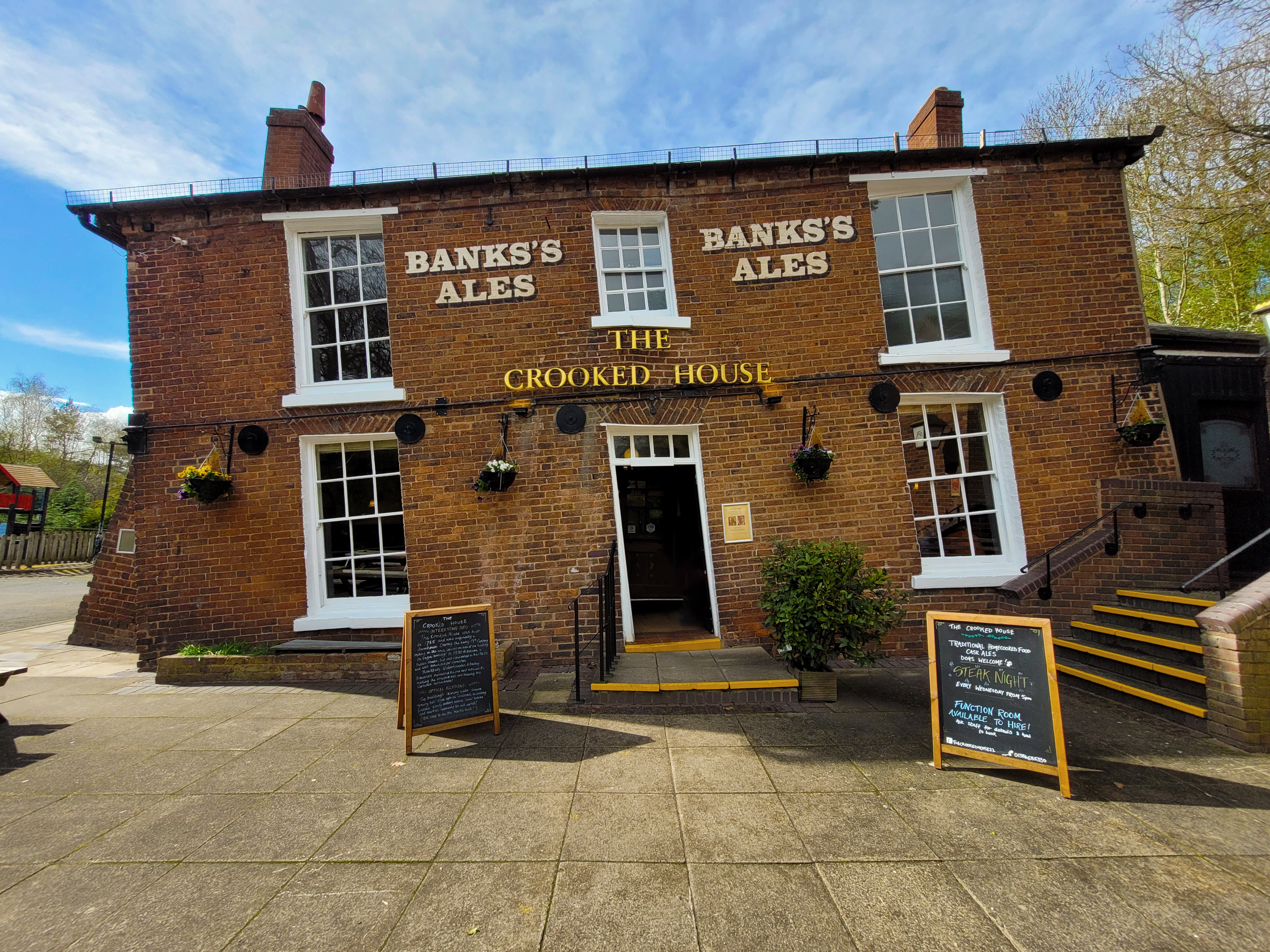
The Crooked House, Himley, known for its extreme lean, caused by mining subsidence

The Hippodrome in March, Isle of Ely was once a cinema. The Hole in the Wall is the name of several very small pubs. One such at Waterloo, London, is spacious but built into a railway viaduct. The Hole in the Wall, Gibraltar was an iconic bar well frequented by the navy workers. The Hundred House Inn, Great Witley originates from when the building was a collecting house for the tithes from districts in the Doddingtree Hundred. The Lattice House, King's Lynn was named for its timbered structure. The Thatched House Tavern, Cambridge is named after the building's roofing. The Three Legged Mare, High Petergate, York is named after the design of a gallows, like the one in the pub's garden; affectionately known as the Wonky Donkey.

=== Services provided by the pub ===
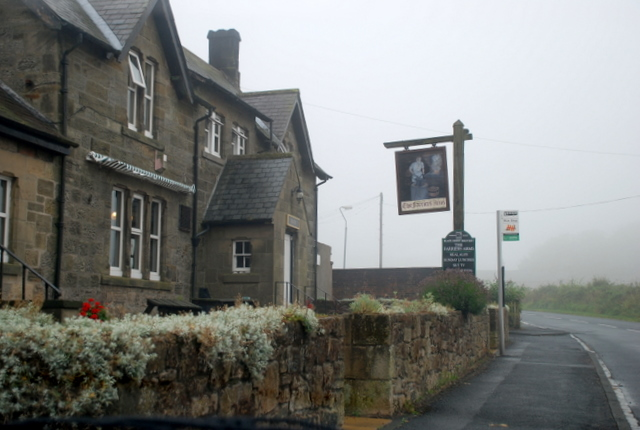
The Farriers Arms, Shilbottle, Northumberland

Several old pub names describe services (other than serving beer) that were provided by a pub. Checkers or Chequer(s), such as at March, Isle of Ely, harks back to ancient Rome, when a chequer board indicated banking services. The checked board was used as an aid to counting, and is the origin of the word exchequer. The Pewter Platter, Cross Street, Hatton Garden †, identified a pub where meals were served. The Coach & Horses indicated a coaching inn, while the Farriers Arms was a pub with a farrier who could re-shoe the traveller's horses while he relaxed, and the Wheelwrights was a name for a pub where a coach's wheels could be repaired or replaced. Names could also be one-offs, like the Free Press in Cambridge, named for when part of the building was used to print a newspaper.

=== Food ===
Some pub names refer to items of food to tempt the hungry traveller. For example, The Baron of Beef in Cambridge refers to a double sirloin joined at the backbone, while the Red Herring, Great Yarmouth is named after a product of the local fishing industry.

=== Beer ===
Pub names from the brewing process

Several pub names allude to the stages of brewing and serving the beer. The Hop Pole names an item used to support hops, that flavour the beer, while the Barley Mow names the process of harvesting the barley that will be fermented into the beer itself. Names of this type may indicate pubs founded as early as the 12th century. The Malt Shovel names a tool used to turn over the soaked barley grain. The Mash Tun names the brewery vessel used to mix grains with water. Three Barrels names containers for beer. The Brewery Tap was a pub on site or adjacent to a brewery; it often showcased its products to visitors.

Many traditional pub names allude to the beer available inside. The Barley Mow is a stack or sheaf of barley, the principal grain from which beer is made. John Barleycorn is a character of English traditional folk music and folklore, similar to a Green Man. He is annually cut down at the ankles, thrashed, but always reappears—an allegory of growth and harvest based on barley.

The Cock and Bottle names the stopcock used to serve beer from a barrel, and a beer bottle. The Tankard, London is named after the drinks container.

=== Wine ===
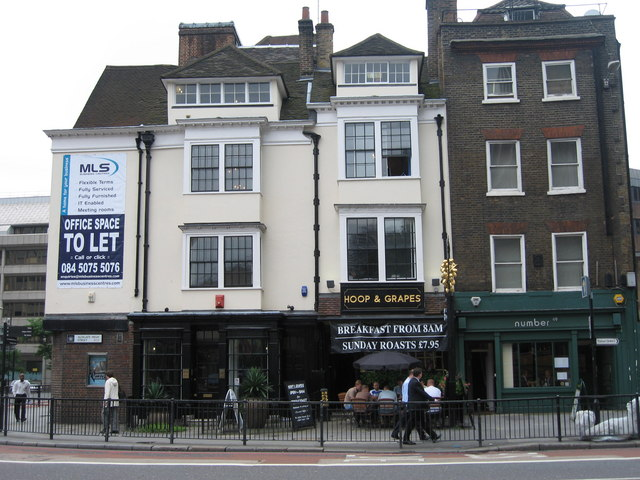
The Hoop and Grapes, Aldgate, was originally the Hops and Grapes, as it sold both beer and wine.

The pub name "The Castle" sometimes denoted the Coat of Arms of Castile in Spain, meaning that Spanish wines were available within. The Spread Eagle's name is from the heraldic depiction of an eagle 'displayed', probably from the arms of Germany, indicating that German wines were available within.

The name of the Hoop and Grapes, Aldgate High Street, London is a version of the Hops and Grapes, its original name, meaning that it sold both beer and wine. The pub survived the 1666 Great Fire of London, which stopped just short of the building.

=== Objects denoting the pub ===
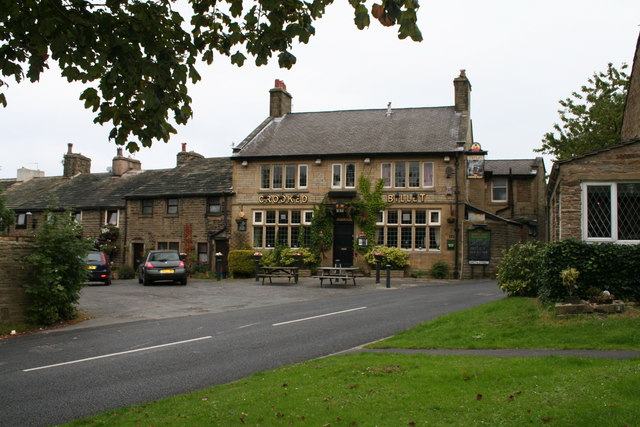
The 'Crooked Billet', Worsthorne, Lancashire

Before painted inn signs became commonplace, medieval publicans often identified their establishments by hanging or standing a distinctive object outside the pub. This tradition dates back to Roman Britain, when vine leaves were hung outside tabernae to show where wine was sold. Pubs named the Hollybush, the Bull and Bush, or just the Bush may represent survivals of this custom.

Other objects used as pub names include a Boot, Copper Kettle, Plough, Boot and Slipper, Horn(e), and Crooked Billet (a bent branch).

== Sports ==
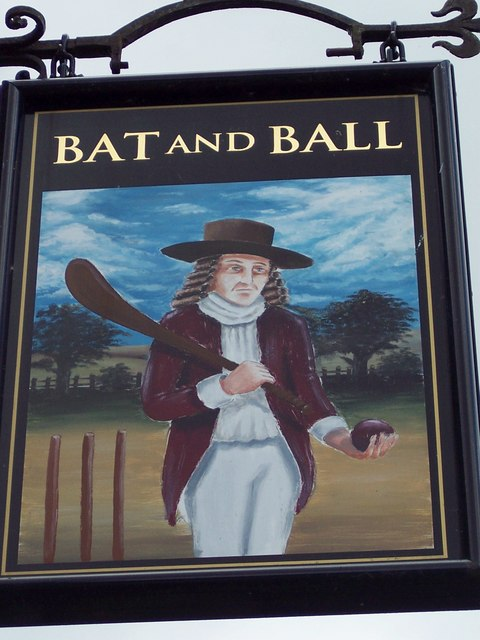
Sign for the Bat and Ball, Breamore, Hampshire

=== Hunting, shooting, and fishing ===
Names like Fox and Hounds, Greyhound, and Hare and Hounds indicate hunting grounds nearby. The Anglers Beerhouse, Wisbech similarly indicates fishing in the vicinity. An unusual foxhunting pub name is the Hark to Bellman, Clitheroe, named after a hound of the huntsman John Peel. The Rabbits, Gainsborough names a frequent object of shooting. The Bird in Hand denotes falconry, possibly from King Henry VIII's liking for that activity. The Dog and Duck once named pubs where duck-baiting events were held. The Fighting Cocks (or just 'Cock') indicated cockfighting (or a heraldic charge). Ye Olde Fighting Cocks in Saint Albans rivals Ye Olde Trip to Jerusalem in Nottingham for the title of oldest pub; its name advertised actual cockfighting entertainment in the pub, accompanied by gambling on the winner.

=== Other sports ===
Some pubs are named for other kinds of sport. Bowls is popular in the Manchester area: some of the greens are attached to pubs, including the Bowling Green Hotel in Chorlton-cum-Hardy. The Nine Pins, Cambridge † was named after that sport, while the Cricketers Arms and the Bat and Ball indicate cricket.

== Places and things ==
Some pubs are named for a place, building, nearby topographic feature, or local animals and plants.

=== Nearby structures ===
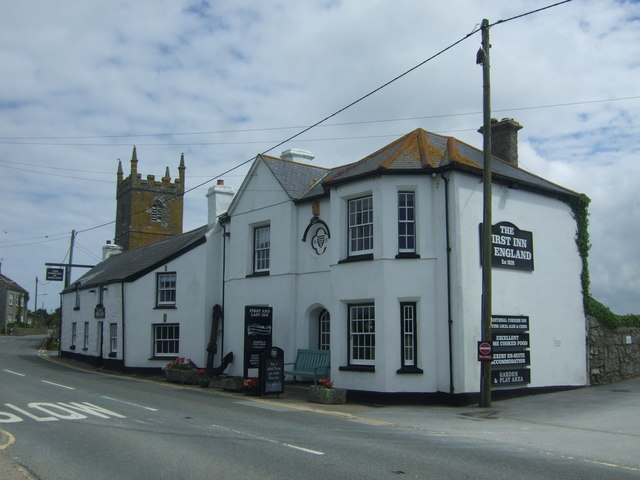
First and Last Inn, Sennen, Cornwall, at the Western tip of the Penwith peninsula

A simple example is the Barrack Tavern, Woolwich Common, which is near the army barracks at Royal Arsenal, Woolwich. The Horsefair Tavern, Wisbech (from 2023 The Magwitch) was named after the Horsefair (once a site for selling horses). The Bridge Inn, Wilburton, Cambridgeshire, was named for the nearby floating bridge, held in place with chains, across the River Great Ouse. The Windmill Inn, Newbold Verdon, Leicestershire, was named for the nearby windmill, which ground grain until about 1910.

A few pubs are named for features of the natural landscape: The Nene Inn, Wisbech is named for the nearby river, while the Bunch of Carrots, Hampton Bishop is named after a rock formation.

The First and Last is the nickname of The Redesdale Arms, the nearest pub to the border between England and Scotland, on the A68 between Rochester and Otterburn, Northumberland. Similarly commemorating an isolated location is the Five Miles from Anywhere Inn: No Hurry, Upware, Cambridgeshire.

=== Animals ===
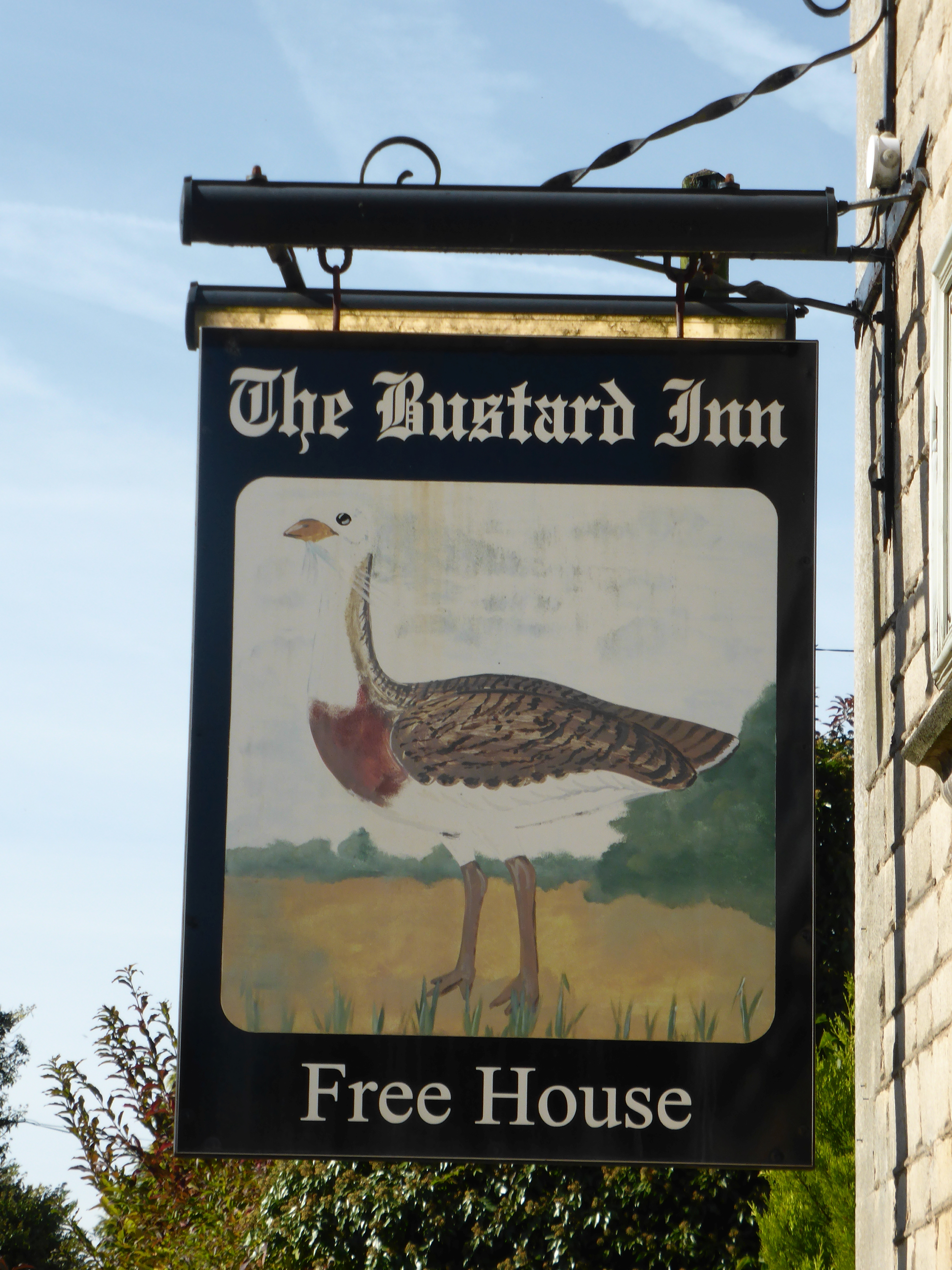
The Bustard Inn sign

Several pubs have animal names, some of them old. The Pied Bull in Chester in reputed to be the oldest licensed house in that city and dates back to 1155. The Pyewipe Inn, Lincoln (attested in 1863), gets its name from the Lincolnshire dialect word for the lapwing. Other pubs with animals in their names include the Bald Faced Stag Inn, Finchley; it was notorious as frequented by murderers and criminal gangs, and possibly at the site of the local gibbet. The Black Bear, Walsoken once had a stuffed black bear at its entrance. The Bustard Inn, South Rauceby (†, now a restaurant) was named in 1860 for a large bird; local tradition holds that the last great bustard in England was shot on the hill behind the restaurant. The Crane, Cambridge was named for that species, once numerous in The Fens; crane is a nickname for the inhabitants. The Lobster, Sheringham was patronised by the lifeboat crew who formed the Shanty Men.

Some pubs are named after individual animals; several pubs, mostly in Yorkshire, are named after the Craven Heifer (1807-1812), a cow bred on the Bolton Abbey estate, famous as England's largest.

A particular case is naming after individual racehorses: at least 20 pubs have such names. The Windmill at Tabley Inferior is named after a racehorse once owned by former local landowner Lord de Tabley. The Altsidora at Bishop Burton recalls the horse of that name that won the St Leger Stakes in 1813. The Amato at Epsom commemorates the winner of the Derby in 1838, while the Arkle in Ashleworth is named for the famous Irish 1960s racehorse, and the Red Rum in Grimethorpe recalls the thoroughbred with that name that won the Grand National steeplechase three times.

=== Plants ===
Several plant names are used for pubs; if "Royal Oak" is accepted as one such, then it is one of the commonest, as the name is used by hundreds of pubs across England. Among the pubs named Hand and Flower(s) is one in Hammersmith, London. Other plant-named pubs include the Artichoke at Chartham, Kent, and the Olde Yew Tree Inn, Westbere, Kent, founded in 1348.

== Transport ==
=== Land ===
Some pub names allude to the road they are on, like the Highway Inn, Burford, or to things that were once seen on their road, like the Steamer, Welwyn, Hertfordshire: the pub is at the top of a steep hill where carriers required an extra horse (a cock-horse) to help get the wagon up the hill. After its exertion the cock-horse could be seen standing steaming on a cold day as its sweat evaporated. Several pub names are from common sights on 18th-century roads, like the Coach and Horses, Horse and Groom, or Waggon and Horses. A less common name is I Am the Only Running Footman, Mayfair, London; it is named after a servant employed to run ahead of a carriage and pay tolls. More recently, the Rusty Bicycle has become the new name of the Eagle in Oxford: the University of Oxford's students often cycle round the town. With the construction of canals and then railways in the Industrial Revolution, pubs named Navigation Inn and then Railway Inn or Station Inn became commonplace.

=== Water ===
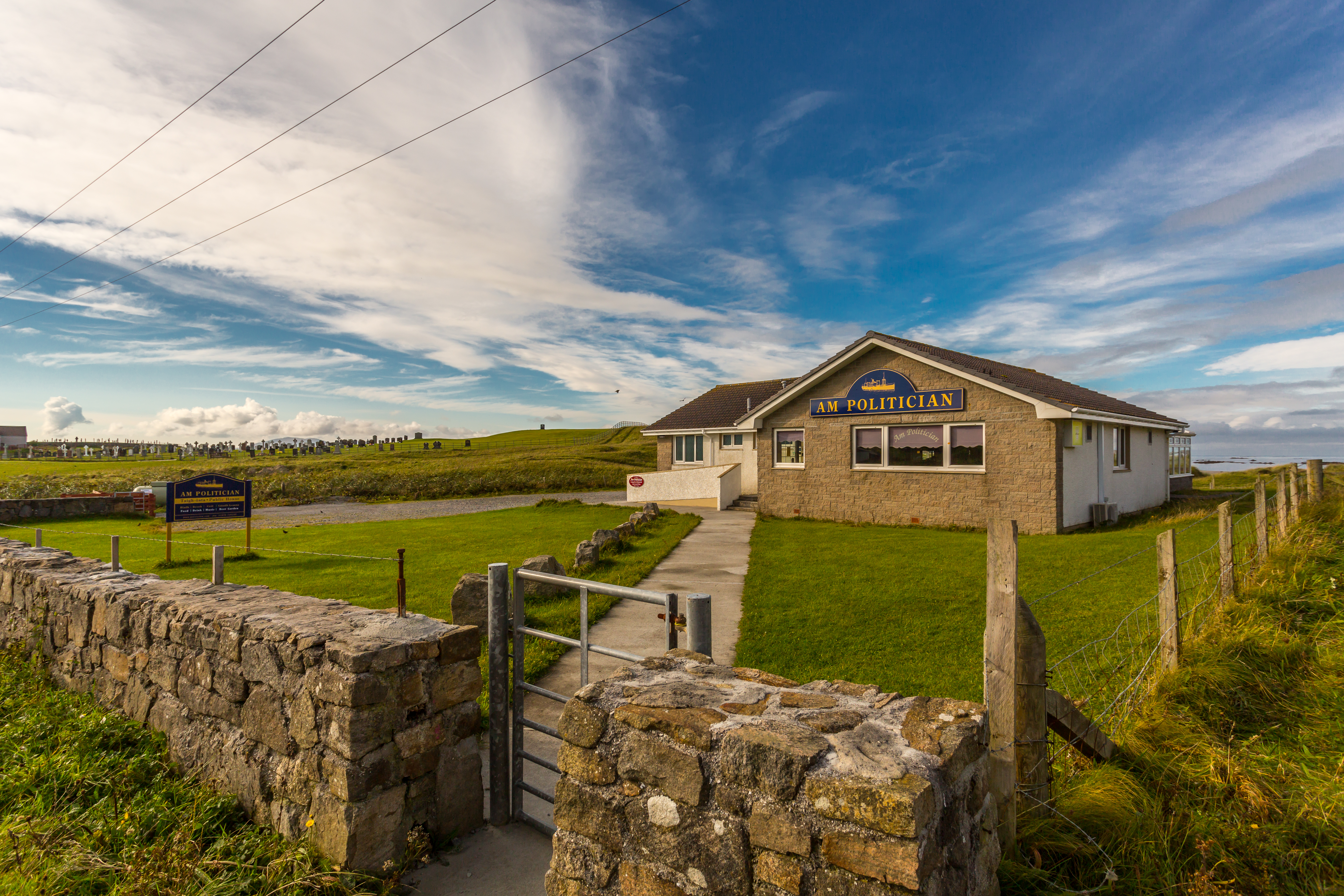
Am Politician, Eriskay's only pub, was named after the SS Politician which sank there in 1941, releasing its cargo of cases of whisky.

Many pubs are beside water or in ports, benefiting from visitors from both land and sea. Pub names recalling sailors include the Jolly Sailor, Jovial Sailor, and Valiant Sailor. The Black Buoy, Wivenhoe is named after a type of channel marker buoy, as the owners had nautical connections.

Pubs by canals include the Locks Inn, Geldeston, named for the nearby locks. The Shroppie Fly: Audlem, is named after a type of canalboat, the 'Shropshire Fly'. As for rivers, the Tide End Cottage, Teddington marks the former tidal limit of the River Thames.

Some pubs are named for types of boat, including The Fishing Buss, Southwold; the Lifeboat Inn, Holme-Next-The-Sea, once a smuggler's inn; the Old Ferryboat, Holywell, Cambridgeshire; the Pilot Boat, such as at Bembridge, Isle of Wight; and the Steam Packet Tavern, Norwich.

A special case is Am Politician, Eriskay. It is named (in Gaelic) after the SS Politician which sank close to the island in 1941 with a cargo including large amounts of whisky, prompting the story of the Compton Mackenzie novel Whisky Galore.

=== Air ===
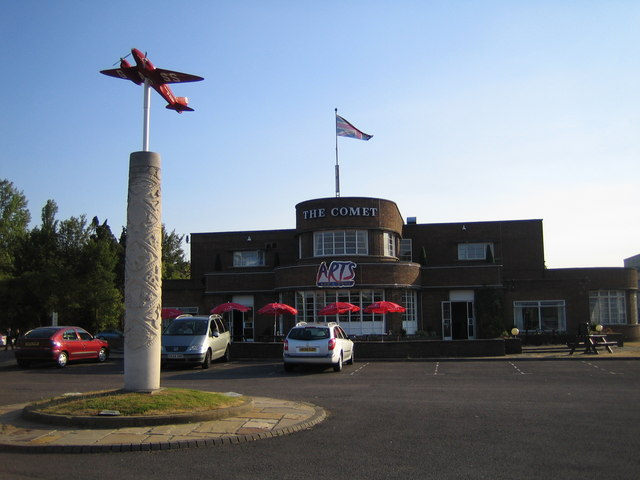
Hatfield, The Comet pub and memorial; the carving of the pillar is by Eric Kennington

Air transport began with balloons, commemorated in pubs such as the Balloon, Stamford † (attested in 1848), near where the balloonist Mr. H. Green had made several ascents, and the Air Balloon in Birdlip, Gloucestershire, again near a field where early ascents were made.

From the 20th century, several pub names recall pioneering aircraft, like the Comet at Hatfield, Hertfordshire: the pub is named for the de Havilland DH.88 racer, famous for winning of the 1934 McRobertson Cup air race. The Canopus, Hill Road, Borstal, Rochester † is similarly named after the flying boats produced at the nearby Short Brothers aircraft factory, while the Flying Boat, Dartford is housed in what was the office of Beadles, a company which manufactured the floats for Sunderland flying boats in the Second World War. The Airman, Feltham, Middlesex is named for its proximity to the London Air Park (latterly Hanworth Air Park). The Flying Bedstead, Hucknall, Nottinghamshire † (now demolished): was named after the prototype aircraft which led to the Harrier Jump Jet. Finally the name of the Red Arrow, Lutterworth, Leicestershire recalls the name of the RAF aerobatics team; the pub has a sloping triangular roof and was formerly called the "flying saucer".

== Literature ==
=== Names from fiction ===
Some pub names from fiction

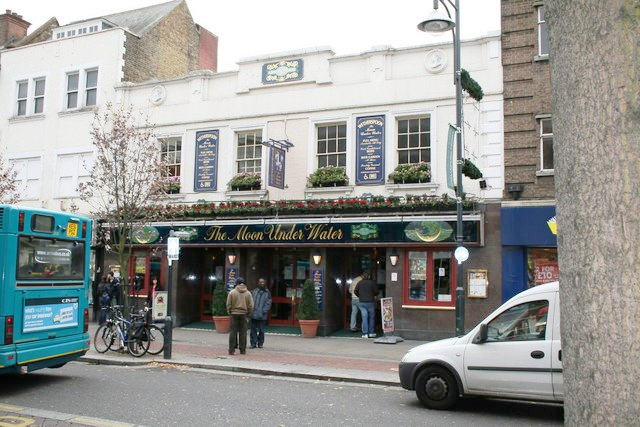
The Moon Under Water, Watford, named after George Orwell's description

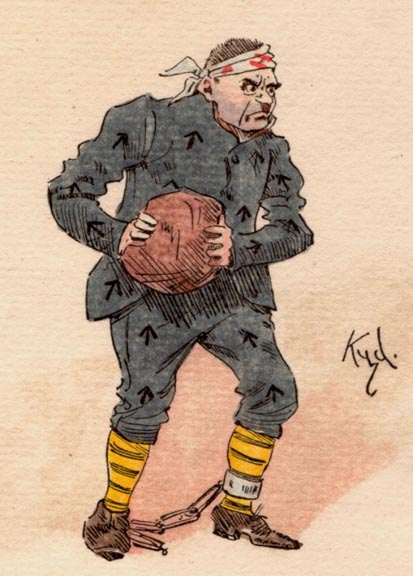
Abel Magwitch, by "Kyd" (Joseph Clayton Clark), c. 1900

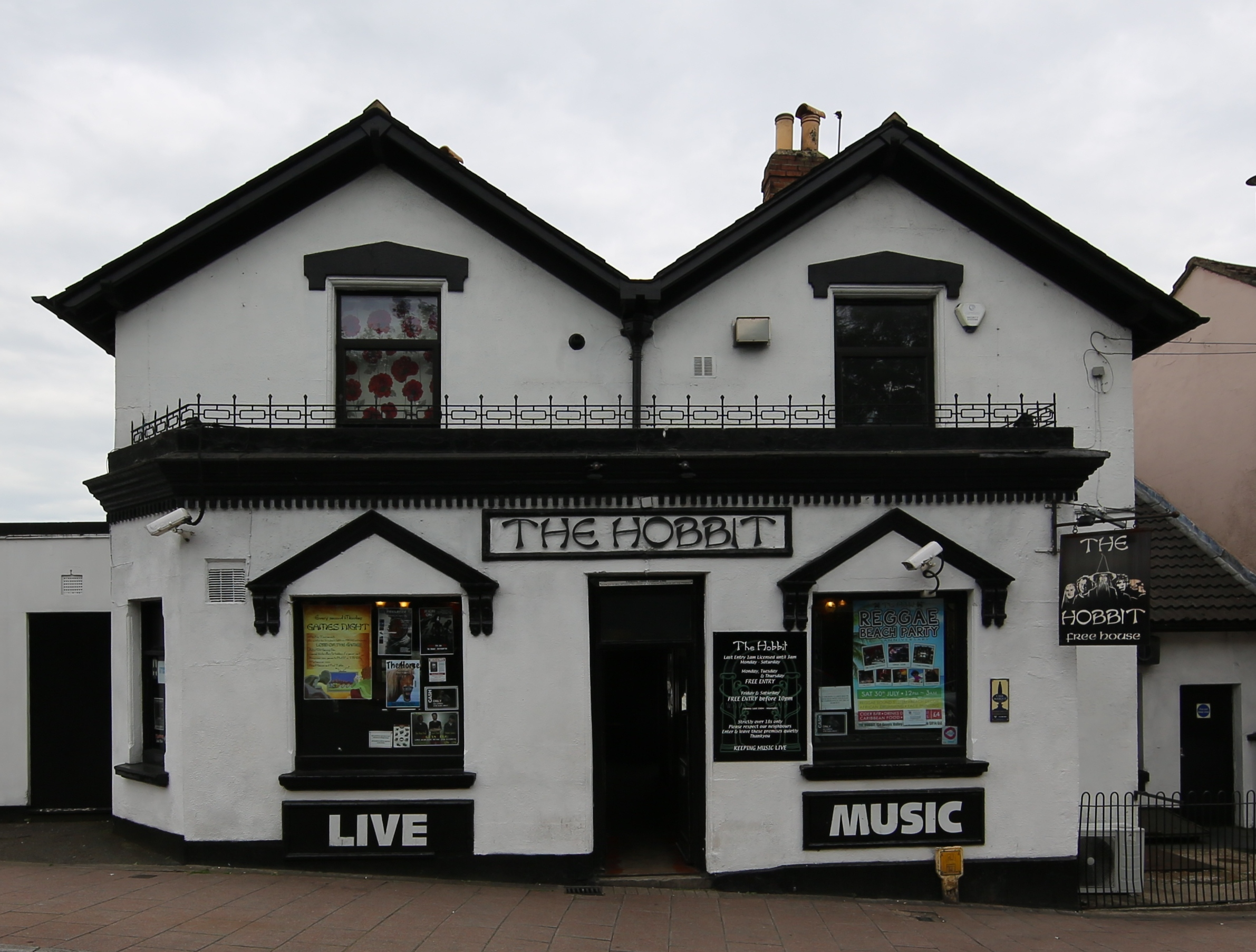
The Hobbit, Southampton, named for the 1937 book by J. R. R. Tolkien

Several pubs are named for works of fiction, their lead characters, or their authors.

Books, characters, and authors commemorated in pub names
Pub	Work	Author	Date	Notes
Lass o' Gowrie, Manchester	"Lass o' Gowrie"	Carolina Nairne	c. 1750	Poem
Peveril of the Peak, Manchester	Peveril of the Peak	Sir Walter Scott	1823	Name more likely from the Manchester to London stagecoach
Paul Pry Inn, Peterborough	Paul Pry	John Poole	1825	Main character in play of same name
Uncle Tom's Cabin, Reach, Cambridgeshire	Uncle Tom's Cabin	Harriet Beecher Stowe	1852	Campaigned for abolition of slavery
Eagle, City Road	"Pop Goes the Weasel"	Traditional	c. 1852	"Up and down the City Road / In and out the Eagle" is a couplet in the second verse of the song
Magwitch, Wisbech	Great Expectations	Charles Dickens	1861	Named after Abel Magwitch; the manuscript is in Wisbech & Fenland Museum
Three Pigeons, Norwich, etc	Our Mutual Friend	Charles Dickens	1865	Used in several books and plays
Jabez Clegg, Manchester †	The Manchester Man	Isabella Banks	1876	Named after the title character
Sherlock Holmes, Charing Cross, London	Series of books and short stories	Arthur Conan Doyle	1887 on	Main character in the books. The pub contains a reproduction of Sherlock Holmes's study
Cat and Custard Pot, Shipton Moyne	Handley Cross; or, Mr. Jorrock's Hunt	R. S. Surtees	1892	Imaginary pub of this name in the book
Herbert Wells, Woking	The War of the Worlds	H. G. Wells	1897	The town of Woking was destroyed by Martian invaders in the novel. A 25 feet (7.6-metre) tall statue of a Martian stands in Chobham Road in the town, and a Martian is depicted in a drawing in the pub
Moon and Sixpence (multiple places)	The Moon and Sixpence	W. Somerset Maugham	1919	Wetherspoons pubs in Portland, Oregon; Whitby, North Yorkshire; Harrow, Middlesex; Soho, London
John Masefield, New Ferry, Merseyside	—	John Masefield	1930 on	Masefield was Poet Laureate from 1930 to 1967. He served for some years on a naval training ship, HMS Conway, off New Ferry pier
Edgar Wallace, The Strand, London	—	Edgar Wallace	1930s	Wrote a series of mystery books
The Hobbit, Southampton	The Hobbit	J. R. R. Tolkien	1937	Threatened with legal action by US movie lawyers
Moon Under Water (multiple places)	"The Moon Under Water"	George Orwell	1946	Essay describes Orwell's perfect pub. The Wetherspoons pub chain has used the name for 13 of its outlets

=== Pubs in fiction from real-world pubs ===
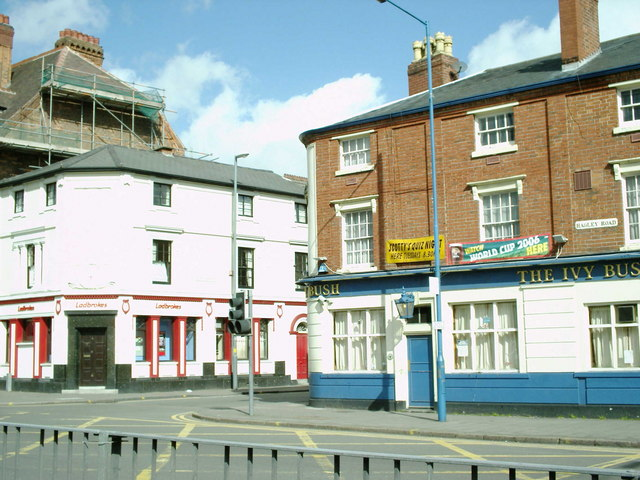
The Ivy Bush, Edgbaston, West Midlands

Some well-known pub names in fiction derive from real English pubs. The Ivy Bush is a "small inn on the Bywater road" near Hobbiton in The Shire in J. R. R. Tolkien's The Lord of the Rings. Here Gaffer Gamgee recounted to the other regulars his stories about Bilbo and Frodo Baggins, who were about to throw a magnificent joint birthday party. The most likely real-world source is an Edgbaston pub called the Ivy Bush, near where Tolkien lived when he was growing up in Birmingham. The Fortune of War, Smithfield was on "Pie Corner" (where the Great Fire of London stopped) and was frequented by Resurrectionists including the London Burkers, two of whom, John Bishop and Thomas Williams, were hanged for murder after they sold the bodies for dissection. The pub is mentioned in William Makepeace Thackeray's 1848 Vanity Fair. The 1903 music hall song "Down at the old Bull and Bush" is named for The Old Bull and Bush pub in Hampstead.

== People ==
=== Individuals ===
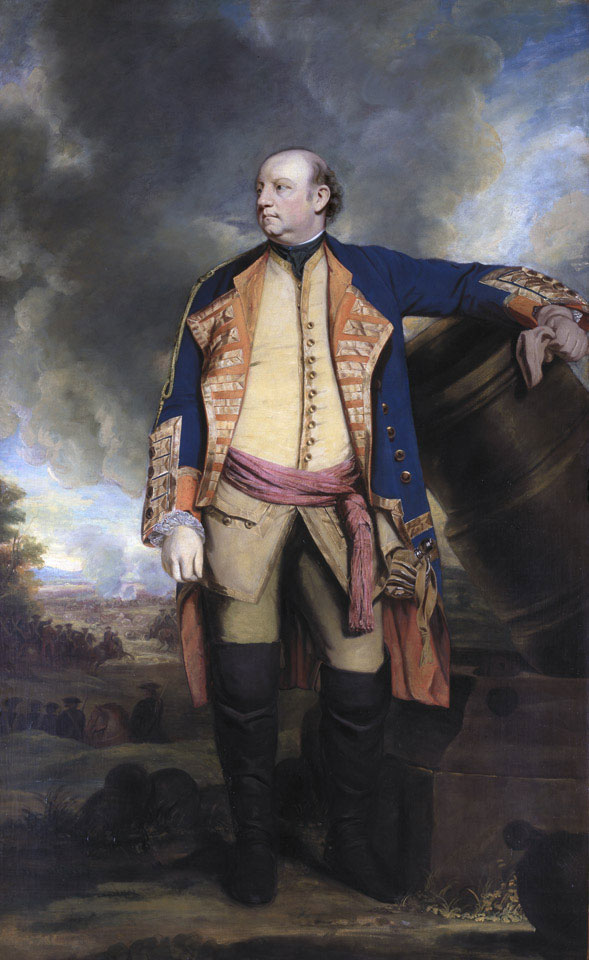
Numerous pubs are named after the Marquess of Granby.

Royal pub names include The King of Prussia, Gosport, for Frederick the Great; The Queen of Bohemia, Wych Street, London, † named after Elizabeth, daughter of James I and Anne of Denmark; and The Three Queens Inn, Burton.

People commemorated directly in pub names include the local lifeguard William Adams at Gorleston-on-Sea, the actor David Garrick, Cambridge †, and the many pubs named after John Manners, Marquess of Granby. Other famous figures on pub signs include Shakespeare, Redland, Bristol, and the politician Robert Walpole, at the Walpole Arms, Itteringham.

Victorious sailors commemorated in pub names include Admiral Lord Nelson, Admiral Rodney at the Rodney Inn, Wisbech, Admiral Collingwood in several pubs in the North-East of England, Guy Earl of Warwick, in Welling, Dartford, dates from at least 1896.

=== Trades ===
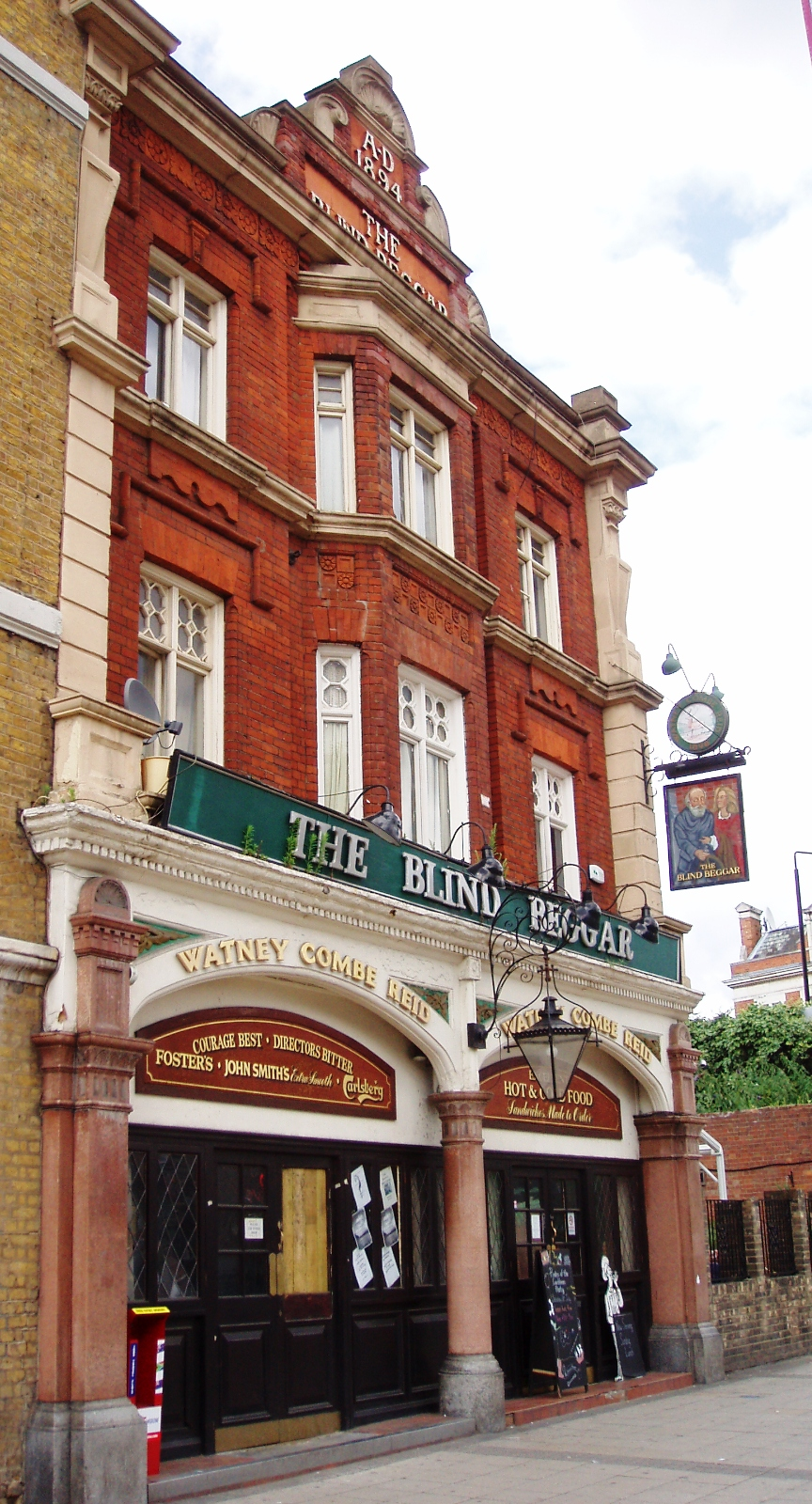
The Blind Beggar, Whitechapel, London E1

Many pub names record long-forgotten trades.

Some pubs named for trades
Pub	Commemorated trade
The Blind Beggar, Whitechapel	The story of Henry de Montfort
Chemic Tavern (formerly Chemical Tavern), Leeds, West Yorkshire	Workers at the nearby Woodhouse Chemical Works, (c. 1840–1900). It was a beer house in the 1861 census, when the licensee was James Lapish.
Drum and Monkey, Glasgow	Showmen who travelled with a performing monkey whose tricks included beating a drum
Fen Plough, Chatteris	Arable farming
Golden Fleece	The wool trade
Jolly Nailor in Atherton, Greater Manchester	Nail manufacture, present in the area since the 14th century
The Light Horseman, York	Local cavalry
Ram Skin, Spalding, Lincolnshire†	Local wool industry
Rifle Volunteer, or Volunteers Arms	The army
Spade and Becket, Chatteris, † Isle of Ely	Peat digging
Trowel and Hammer, Norwich	Local bricklayers
Woodsman, Woodman's Cottage	Forestry

== Names with a purpose ==
=== Puns, jokes and corruptions ===
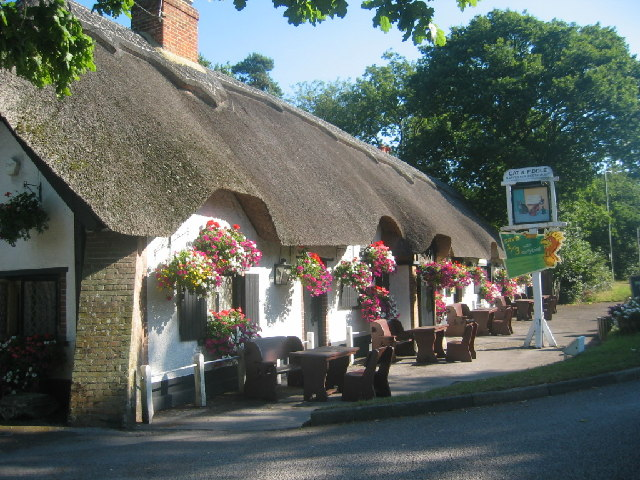
One of the pubs called Cat and Fiddle, in Hinton Admiral, Hampshire

Although puns became increasingly popular through the 20th century, they should be considered with care. Supposed corruptions of foreign phrases can have simpler explanations. The Dolphin is anglicised from the French Dauphin, commemorating battles in which England defeated France. For example the one in Wellington, Somerset is named in honour of Wellington's victory at the Battle of Waterloo. Some names are simply humorous, like the Paraffin Oil Shop †, in eastern Liverpool, named so that people could say that they were going to buy paraffin.

=== Curiosities ===
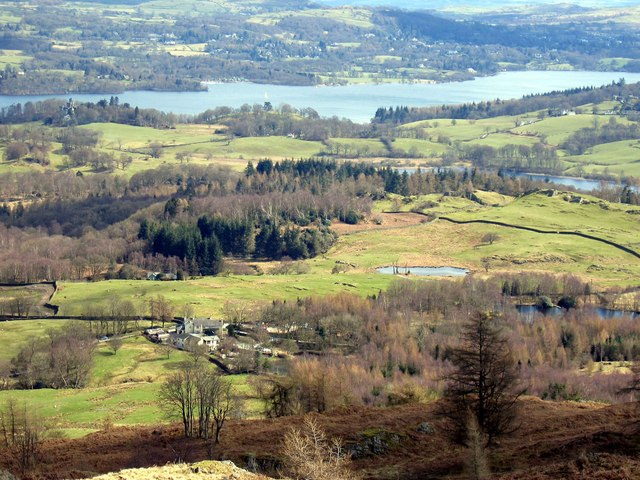
The Drunken Duck pub seen from Black Crag in the Lake District

The pubs with the shortest and longest names in Britain are both in Stalybridge: Q and The Old Thirteenth Cheshire Astley Volunteer Rifleman Corps Inn. The longest name of a London pub, I am the Only Running Footman, was used as the title of a mystery novel by Martha Grimes. There is a "pub with no name" in Southover Street, Brighton, and another near to Petersfield, Hampshire so known (despite having an actual name), because its sign on the nearest main road has been missing for many years. The Salley Pussey's Inn at Royal Wootton Bassett is said to have been named after Sarah Purse, whose family owned The Wheatsheaf pub in the 19th century. In the 1970s the name was changed to the Salley Pussey's. The Defector's Weld, Shepherd's Bush is apparently named for the coming together of the Cambridge Five spies during the Cold War.

The Lake District pub the Drunken Duck is supposedly named for a 19th-century event, when a landlady found her ducks apparently dead. After she had plucked them in preparation for cooking them, they awoke, recovering from eating some beer-soaked feed. She is said to have knitted woollen waistcoats for them to replace their feathers.

=== Pairing and branding ===
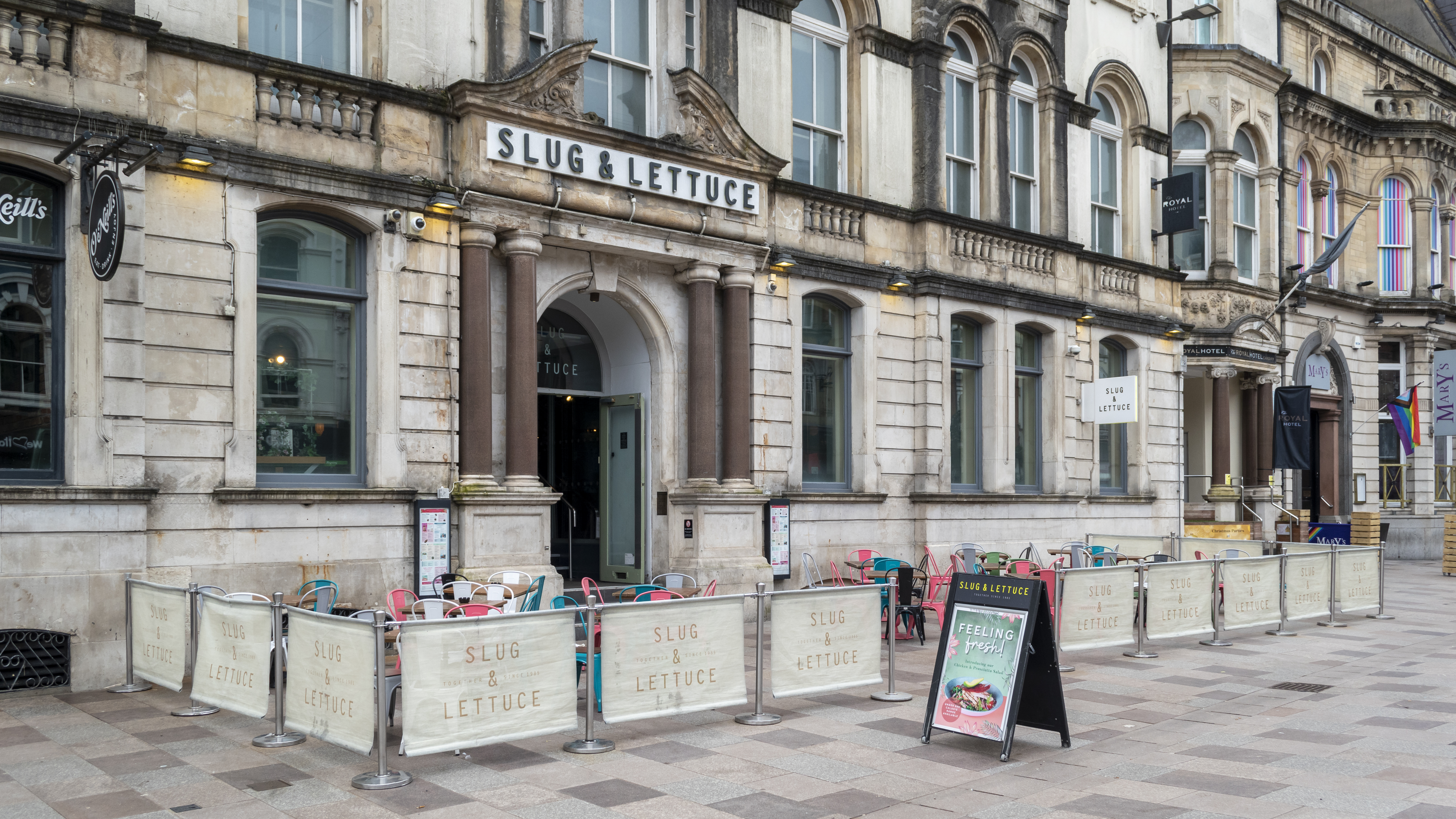
One of the Slug and Lettuce chain of pubs, in Cardiff

Common enough today, the pairing of words in the name of an inn or tavern was rare before the mid-17th century. By 1708, it had become frequent enough for a pamphlet to complain of "the variety and contradictory language of the signs", citing absurdities such as 'Bull and Mouth', 'Whale and Cow', and 'Shovel and Boot'. Two years later an essay in The Spectator echoed this complaint, deriding such contemporary paired names as 'Bell and Neat's Tongue', though accepting 'Cat and Fiddle'. One explanation for doubling is the combining of businesses, for example when a landlord of one pub moved to another premises.

Some pub chains in the UK adopt the same or similar names for many pubs as a means of brand expression. Examples include "The Moon Under Water", commonly used by the JD Wetherspoon chain (and inspired by George Orwell's 1946 essay in the Evening Standard, "The Moon Under Water"), and the "Tap and Spile" brand name used by the now defunct Century Inns chain. Paired names intended to be amusing like the Slug and Lettuce pub chain (all with the same name), and the Firkin Brewery's chain with names like 'Frog and Firkin' in the late 20th century (discontinued when it was taken over by Punch Taverns), was responsible for many more pub names.

== Most common ==
Some of the most common pub names

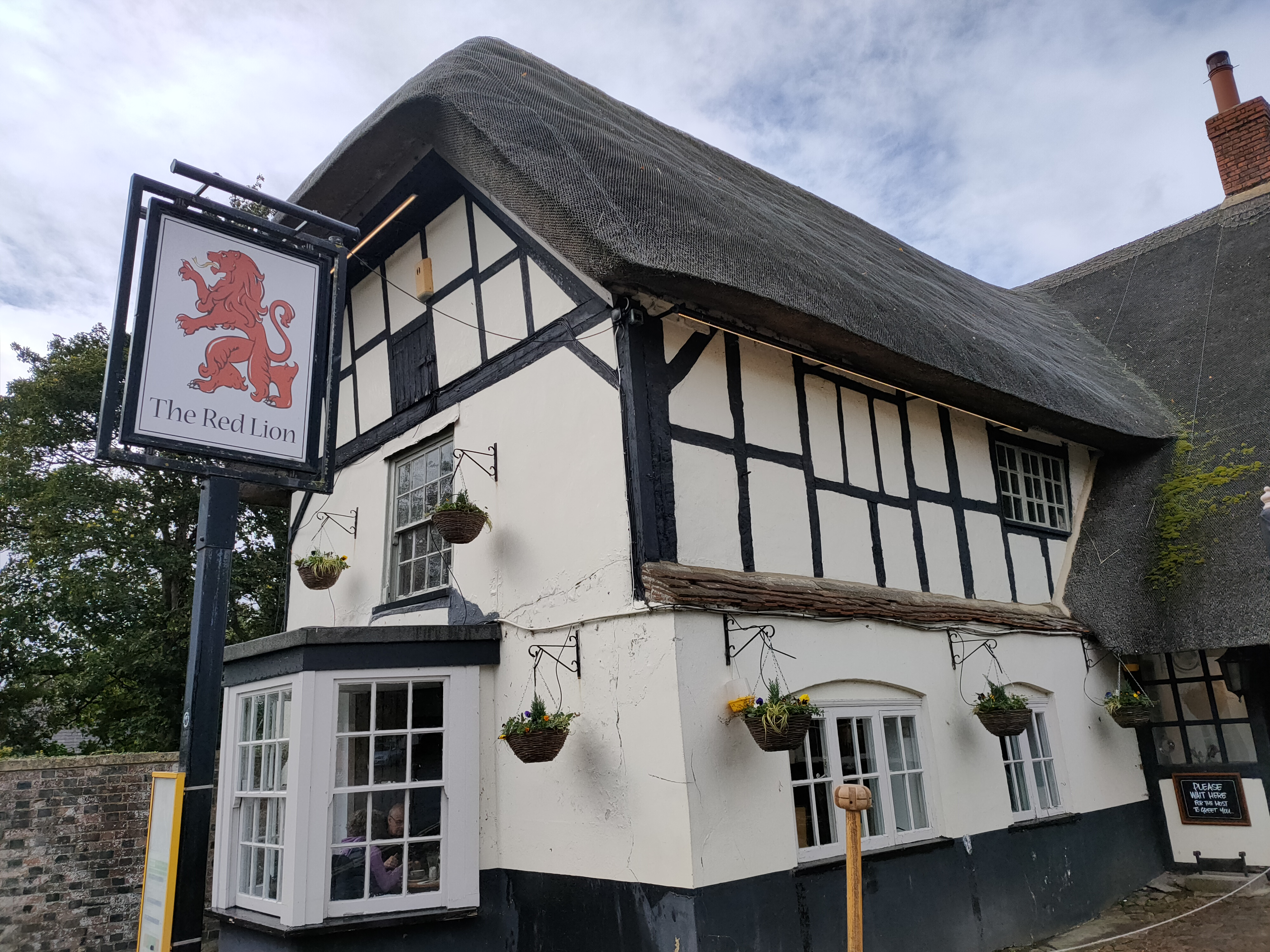
Red Lion, Avebury, Wiltshire

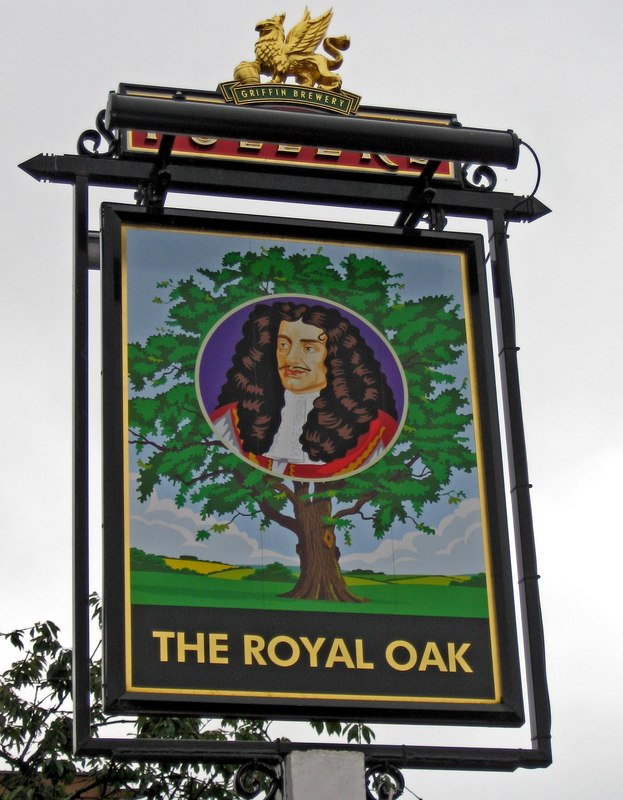
Royal Oak, Guildford, Surrey

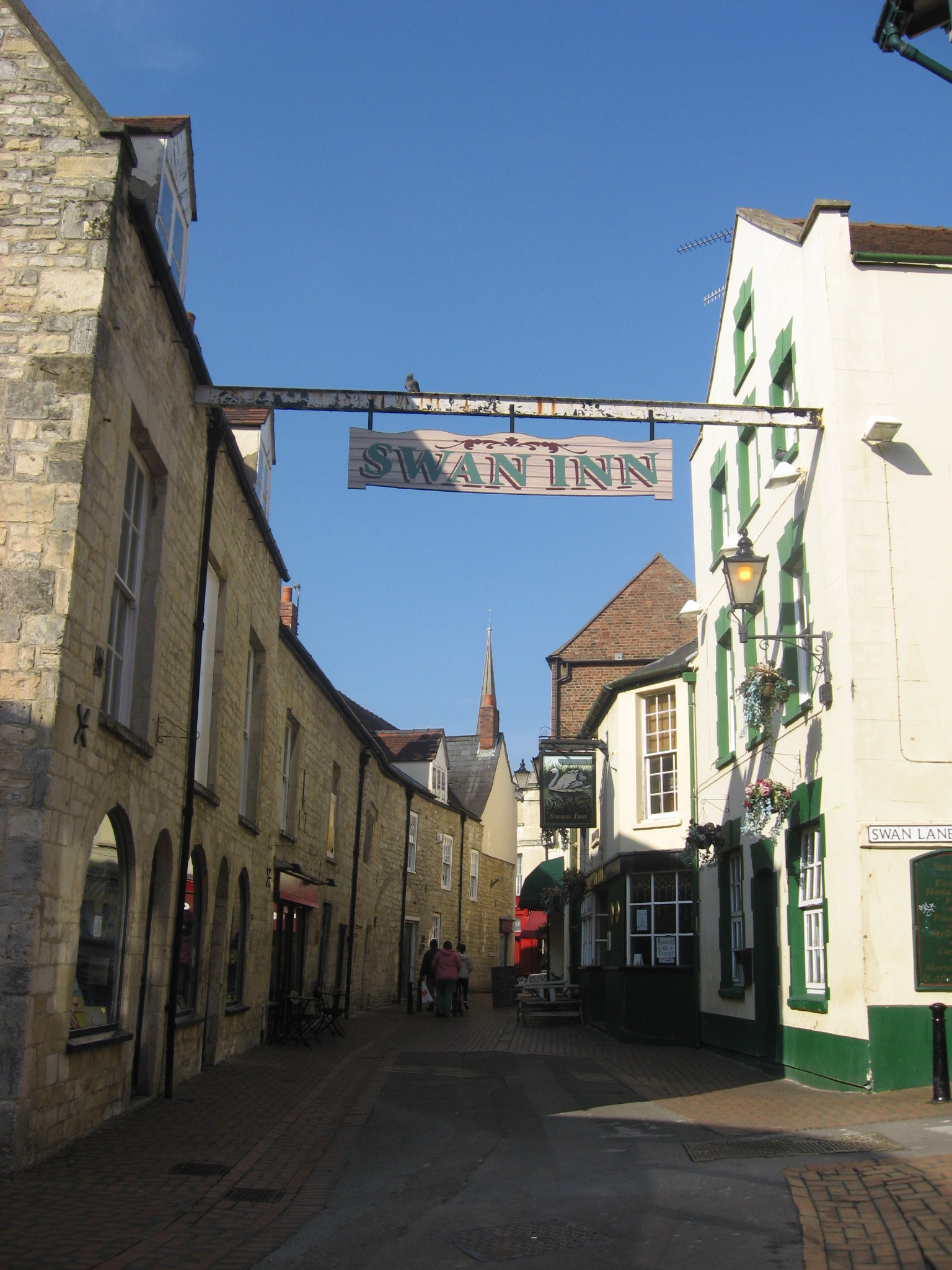
Swan, Stroud, Gloucestershire

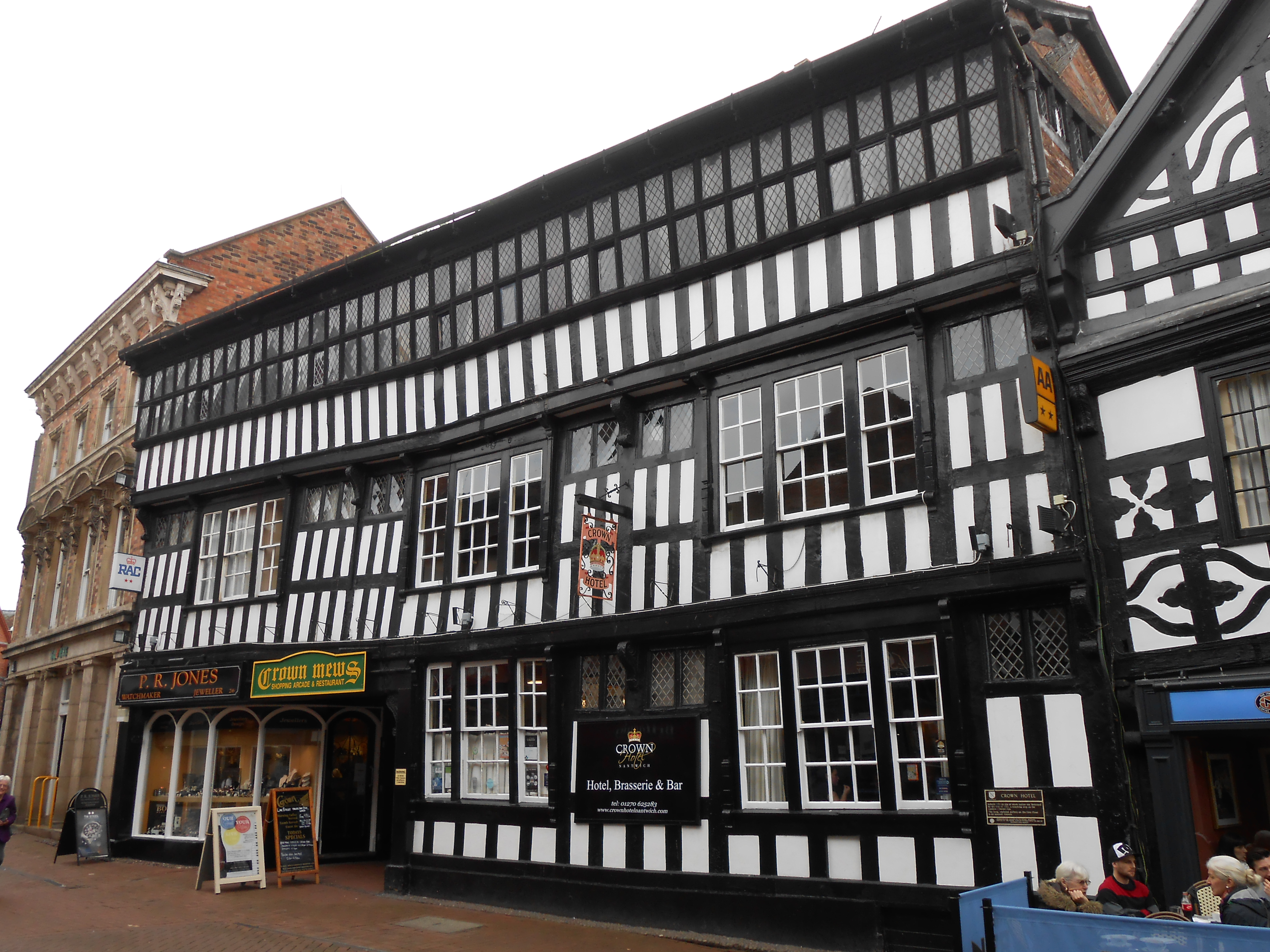
Crown, Nantwich, Cheshire

An authoritative list of the most common pub names in Great Britain is hard to establish, owing to several ambiguities, such as what counts as a pub as opposed to a licensed restaurant, so lists of this form tend to vary hugely. Major surveys include those by the British Beer and Pub Association (BBPA), the Campaign for Real Ale (CAMRA), and Pubs Galore. In addition, many pubs have closed. In 2008, there were some 50,000 pubs in Britain; by 2018 there were about 39,000.

Most common pub names according to different sources

BBPA, 2007

1. Red Lion (759)
2. Royal Oak (626)
3. White Hart (427)
4. Rose and Crown (326)
5. King's Head (310)
6. King's Arms (284)
7. Queen's Head (278)
8. The Crown (261)

CAMRA, 2007

1. Crown (704)
2. Red Lion (668)
3. Royal Oak (541)
4. Swan (451)
5. White Hart (431)
6. Railway (420)
7. Plough (413)
8. White Horse (379)
9. Bell (378)
10. New Inn (372)

Pubs Galore, 2019

1. Red Lion (558)
2. Crown (509)
3. Royal Oak (432)
4. White Hart (317)
5. Swan (296)
6. Plough (294)
7. Railway (294)
8. White Horse (286)
9. Kings Arms (245)
10. Ship (244)

== See also ==
- List of pubs in Australia
- List of pubs in the United Kingdom
