= Moonrakers =

Colloquialism for people from Wiltshire, England

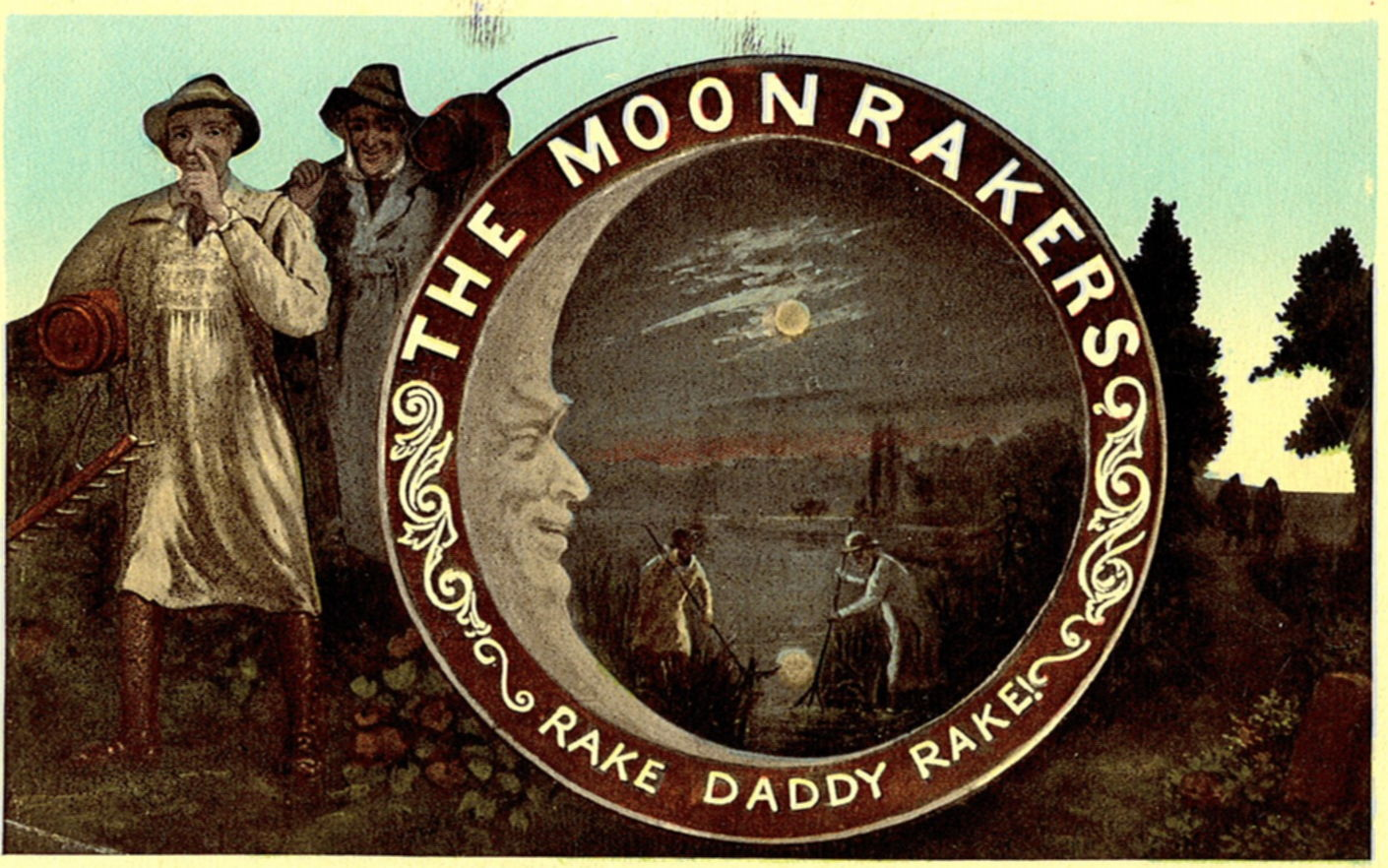
A 1903 postcard illustrating the legend

Moonrakers is the colloquial name for people from Wiltshire, a county in the West Country of England. It derives from a story of smugglers pretending to be catching the moon's reflection in a pond, using a rake.

== Legend ==
This name refers to a folk story set in the time when smuggling was a significant industry in rural England, with Wiltshire lying on the smugglers' secret routes between the south coast and customers in the centre of the country. The story goes that some local people had hidden contraband barrels of French brandy from customs officers in a village pond. While trying to retrieve it at night, they were caught by the revenue men, but explained themselves by pointing to the moon's reflection and saying they were trying to rake in a round cheese. The revenue men, thinking they were simple yokels, laughed at them and went on their way. But, as the story goes, it was the moonrakers who had the last laugh. In the words of Wiltshire shepherd William Little who recounted the story to writer John Yonge Akerman: "Zo the excizeman 'as ax'd 'n the question 'ad his grin at 'n,...but they'd a good laugh at 'ee when 'em got whoame the stuff." (Note: Expanding the elisions gives "So the exciseman as asked un the question had his grin at un, but they had a good laugh at he when them got home the stuff." From the OED: "As: replaced by that, but still common in southern dialect speech." "Him: en, un, 'n, is still current in southern dialect speech." "Him: In s.w. dialects he is the emphatic objective, beside the unemphatic 'en, 'un.")

== Origin ==
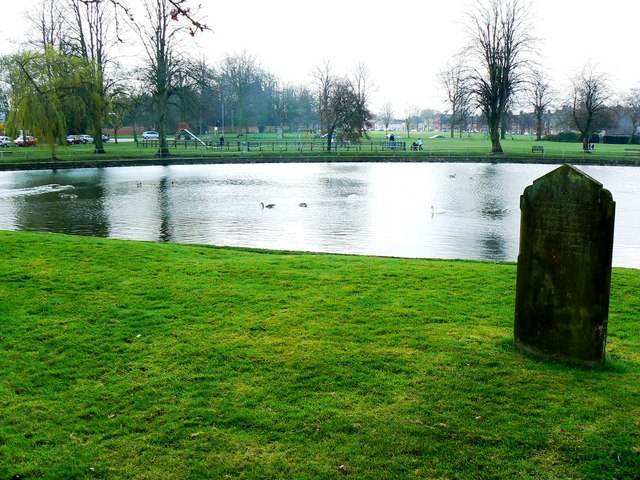
The Crammer, Devizes

The story dates to before 1787, when the Moonrakers tale appeared in Francis Grose's Provincial Glossary. Research by Wiltshire Council's Community History Project shows that a claim can be made for the Crammer, a pond at Southbroom, Devizes, as the original location for the tale. Other accounts naming the village of Bishops Cannings 2 1/2 miles to the north-east of Devizes, which has no pond, are explained by a change in the parish boundaries in 1835, which transferred the Crammer from that parish into the town. However, many other places in the county have laid claim to the story.

== Modern-day usage ==
Supporters of the association football club Oxford United use moonraker as a derogatory term for fans of their Wiltshire-based rivals Swindon Town.

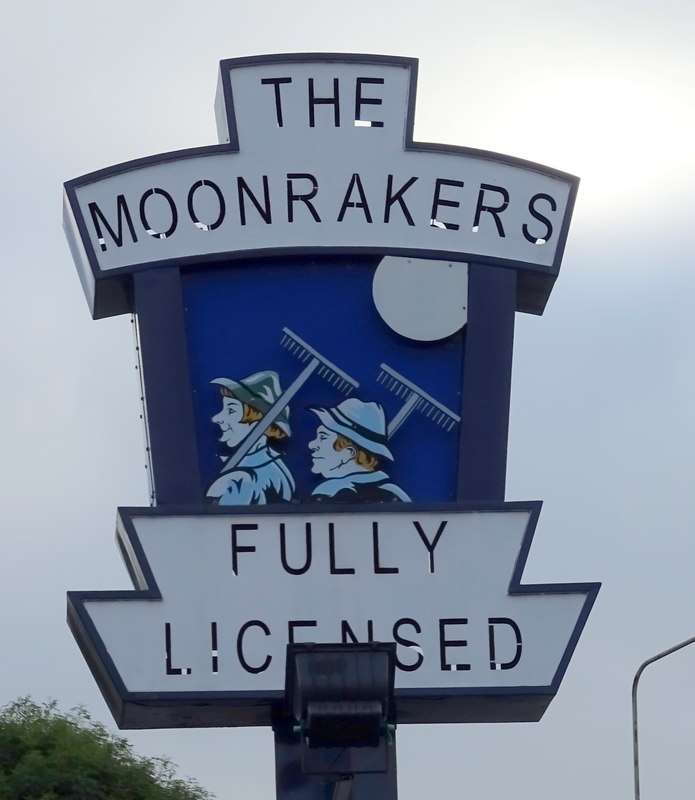
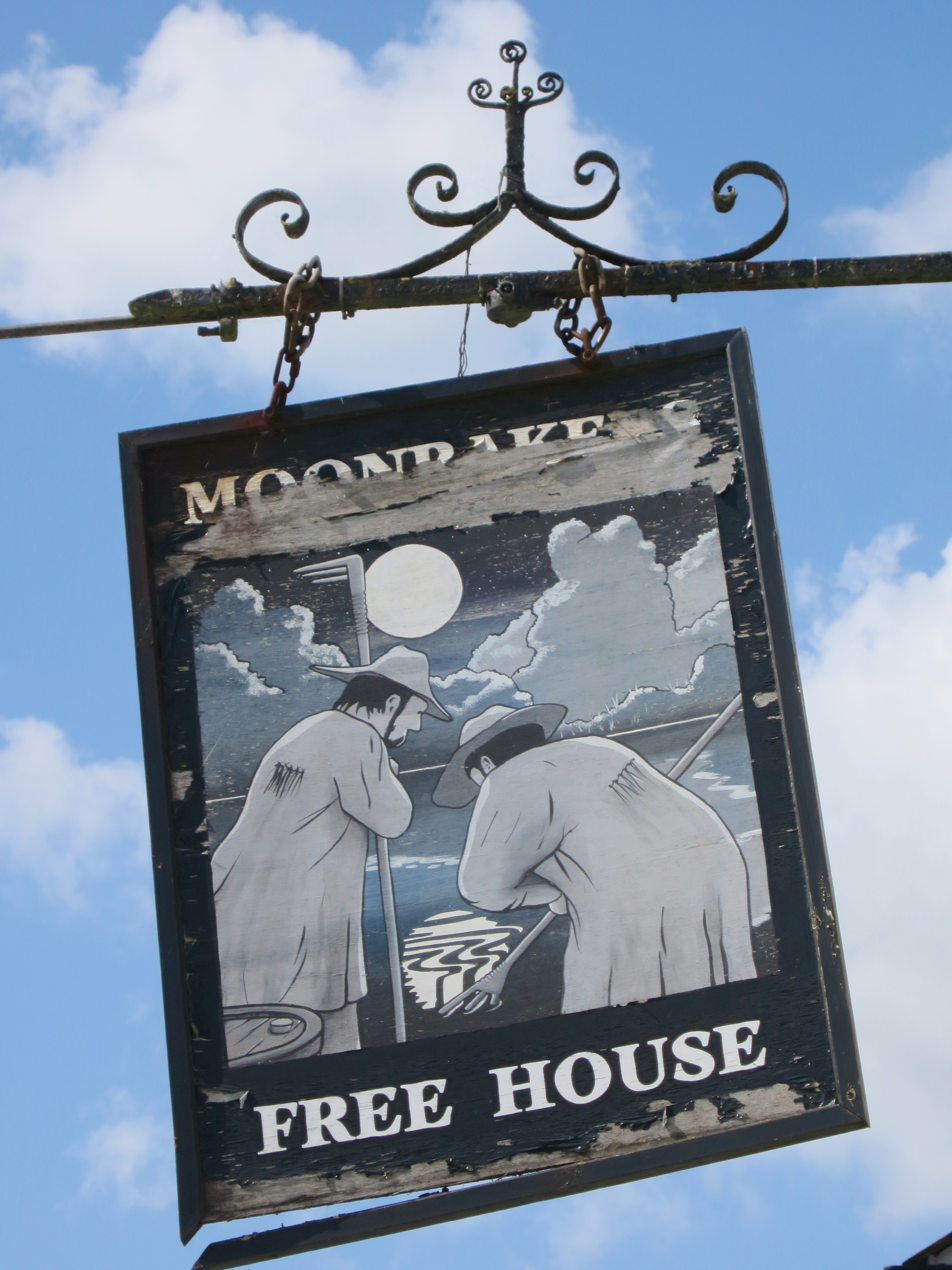
"The Moonrakers" is a popular pub name in Wiltshire: examples from Stratton St Margaret and Pewsey.

People from the town of Middleton, Greater Manchester may also be referred to as Moonrakers.

== See also ==
- The Dog and Its Reflection
- Red herring
- Wise Men of Gotham
