= Land of the Rising Sun (disambiguation) =

Land of the Rising Sun is a popular Western name for Japan.

Land of the Rising Sun may also refer to:

- "Land of the Rising Sun" (national anthem), of the secessionist African state of Biafra
- Land of the Rising Sun (role-playing game), a 1980 samurai game

== See also ==
- Arunachal Pradesh, a state of India known as "Land of the Dawn-Lit Mountains"
- Greater Khorasan (the literal translation of "Khorasan" is "sunrise"), a historical region of Persia
- Rising Sun (disambiguation)
