= The Moon Under Water =

Essay by George Orwell

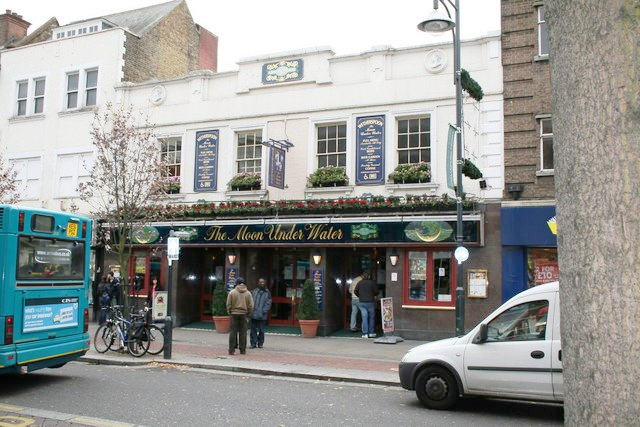
The Moon Under Water, Watford. One of many pubs named after Orwell's description.

"The Moon Under Water" is a 1946 essay by George Orwell, originally published as the Saturday Essay in the Evening Standard on 9 February 1946, in which he provided a detailed description of his ideal public house, the fictitious "Moon Under Water". It was Orwell's last contribution to the Evening Standard.

== Summary ==
Orwell stipulated ten key points that his perfect pub in the London area should have (his criteria for country pubs being different, but unspecified):

1. The architecture and fittings must be uncompromisingly Victorian.
2. Games, such as darts, are only played in the public bar "so that in the other bars you can walk about without the worry of flying darts".
3. The pub is quiet enough to talk, with the house possessing neither a radio nor a piano.
4. The barmaids know the customers by name and take an interest in everyone.
5. It sells tobacco and cigarettes, aspirins and stamps, and "is obliging about letting you use the telephone".
6. "[...] there is a snack counter where you can get liver-sausage sandwiches, mussels (a speciality of the house), cheese, pickles and [...] large biscuits with caraway seeds [...]."
7. "Upstairs, six days a week, you can get a good, solid lunch—for example, a cut off the joint, two vegetables and boiled jam roll—for about three shillings." (about £5 today)
8. "[...] a creamy sort of draught stout [...], and it goes better in a pewter pot."
9. "They are particular about their drinking vessels at "The Moon Under Water" and never, for example, make the mistake of serving a pint of beer in a handleless glass. Apart from glass and pewter mugs, they have some of those pleasant strawberry-pink china ones. [...] but in my opinion beer tastes better out of china."
10. "[...] You go through a narrow passage leading out of the saloon, and find yourself in a fairly large garden [...] Many as are the virtues of the Moon Under Water I think that the garden is its best feature, because it allows whole families to go there instead of Mum having to stay at home and mind the baby while Dad goes out alone."

Orwell admitted that "to be fair", he did know of a few pubs that almost came up to his ideal, including one that had eight of the mentioned qualities.

The essay finishes:

And if anyone knows of a pub that has draught stout, open fires, cheap meals, a garden, motherly barmaids and no radio, I should be glad to hear of it, even though its name were something as prosaic as the Red Lion or the Railway Arms.

== Real pubs ==
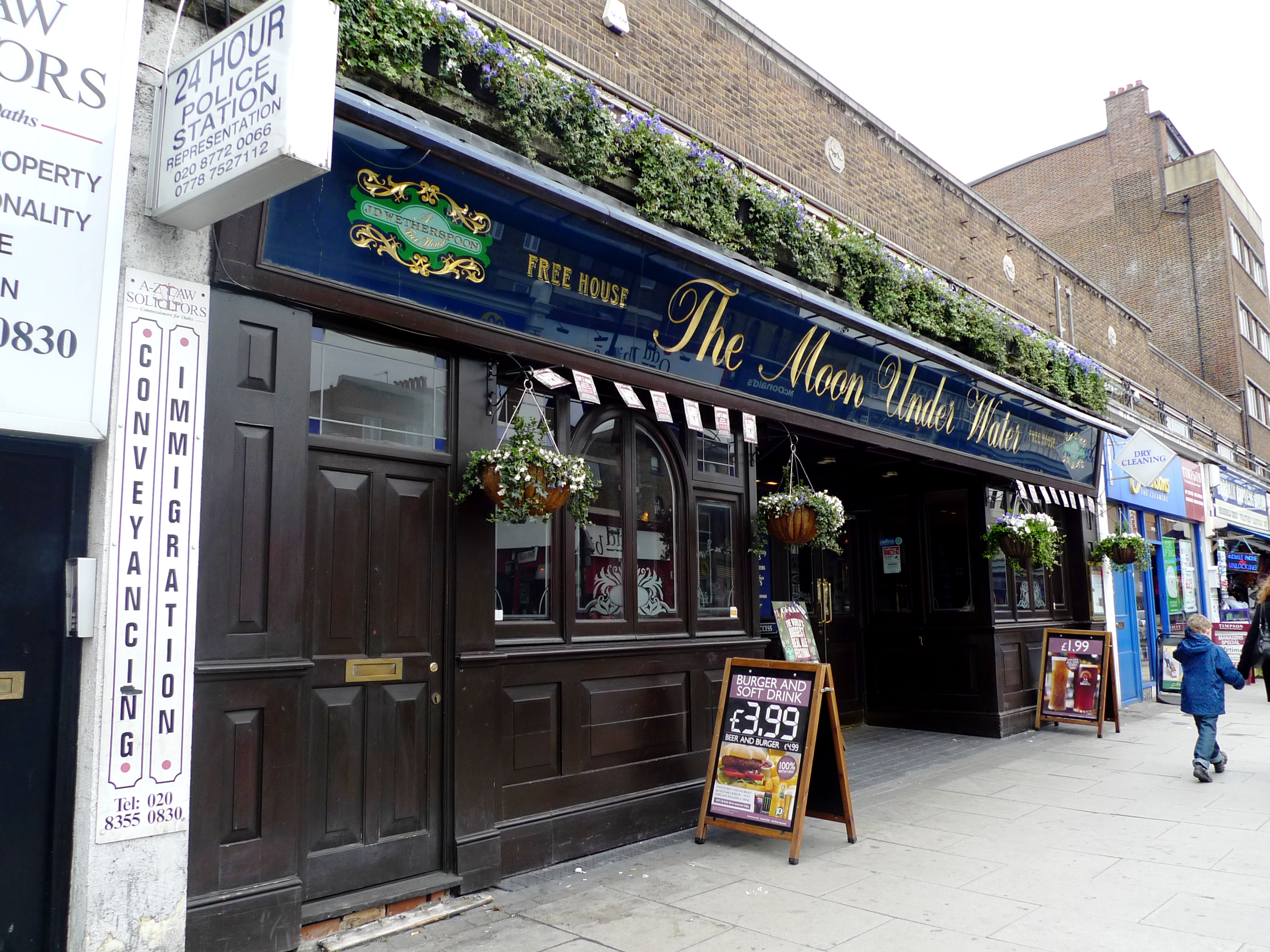
One of London's Moon Under Water pubs in Balham, pictured in 2012. This pub is closed as of 2019

The J D Wetherspoon pub chain has used the name The Moon Under Water for several of its outlets. As of 2025 there are thirteen J D Wetherspoon pubs with this name.

There is a Moon Under Water pub in Victoria, Canada and in Christchurch, New Zealand.

== See also ==
- George Orwell bibliography
- Pub names
