= Rising Son =

Rising Son may refer to:

== Music ==
- Rising Son Records, Arlo Guthrie's record label
- Rising Son, British rapper featured on the remix of the 2004 Nas song "Thief's Theme"
- Rising Son, a 2005 album by O-Shen
- "Rising Son", a 2007 song by Sturm und Drang from Learning to Rock

== Other uses ==
- The Rising Son, an 1873 book by William Wells Brown
- Rising Son (film), a 1990 American TV movie starring Brian Dennehy
- Supernatural: Rising Son, a 2008 comic book miniseries based on the TV series Supernatural

== See also ==
- Rising Sons, a 1960s American rock band
- Rising Sun (disambiguation)
