= The House of the Rising Sun (disambiguation) =

"The House of the Rising Sun" is an American folk song.

House of the Rising Sun may also refer to:

- House of the Rising Sun (Jody Miller album), a 1974 album by American singer Jody Miller
- House of the Rising Sun (Idris Muhammad album), a 1976 album by American jazz drummer Idris Muhammad
- "House of the Rising Sun" (Lost), a 2004 episode of the American television series Lost
- House of the Rising Sun (film), a 2011 film
- House of the Rising Sun (Arduin), a 1986 supplement for the role-playing system Arduin
