= Rising Sun (1980 film) =

1980 Hong Kong film by Edwin Kong

- Theoretical poster preserved in National Museum of Taiwan History
- Chinese: 慘痛的戰爭
- Directed by: Edwin Kong
- Production company: Edko Films
- Release date: 1980
- Country: Hong Kong
- Box office: HK$9.4 million

Rising Sun (Chinese: 慘痛的戰爭; lit. 'Tragic and Painful War') is a 1980 Hong Kong documentary directed by Edwin Kong Chi-man. The film recounts the Second Sino-Japanese War.

It was screened continuously in Hong Kong for 43 days and grossed over HK$9.4 million at the box office, making it the second highest-grossing film in Hong Kong that year and the highest-grossing Hong Kong-produced documentary on record. A copy of the film is currently preserved at the Hong Kong Film Archive.

== Content ==
The film is composed of black-and-white archival footage from Japan and the United States, compiled through the collaboration of Kong and American sources. The first half focuses on events in the Second Sino-Japanese War, including the Nanjing Massacre, the Battle of Taierzhuang, and the Defense of Sihang Warehouse. The second half primarily covers the conflict between Japan and the United States in the Pacific War.
