= The Rocket, Euston =

Pub in Euston, London

Coordinates: 51.528307°N 0.128914°W

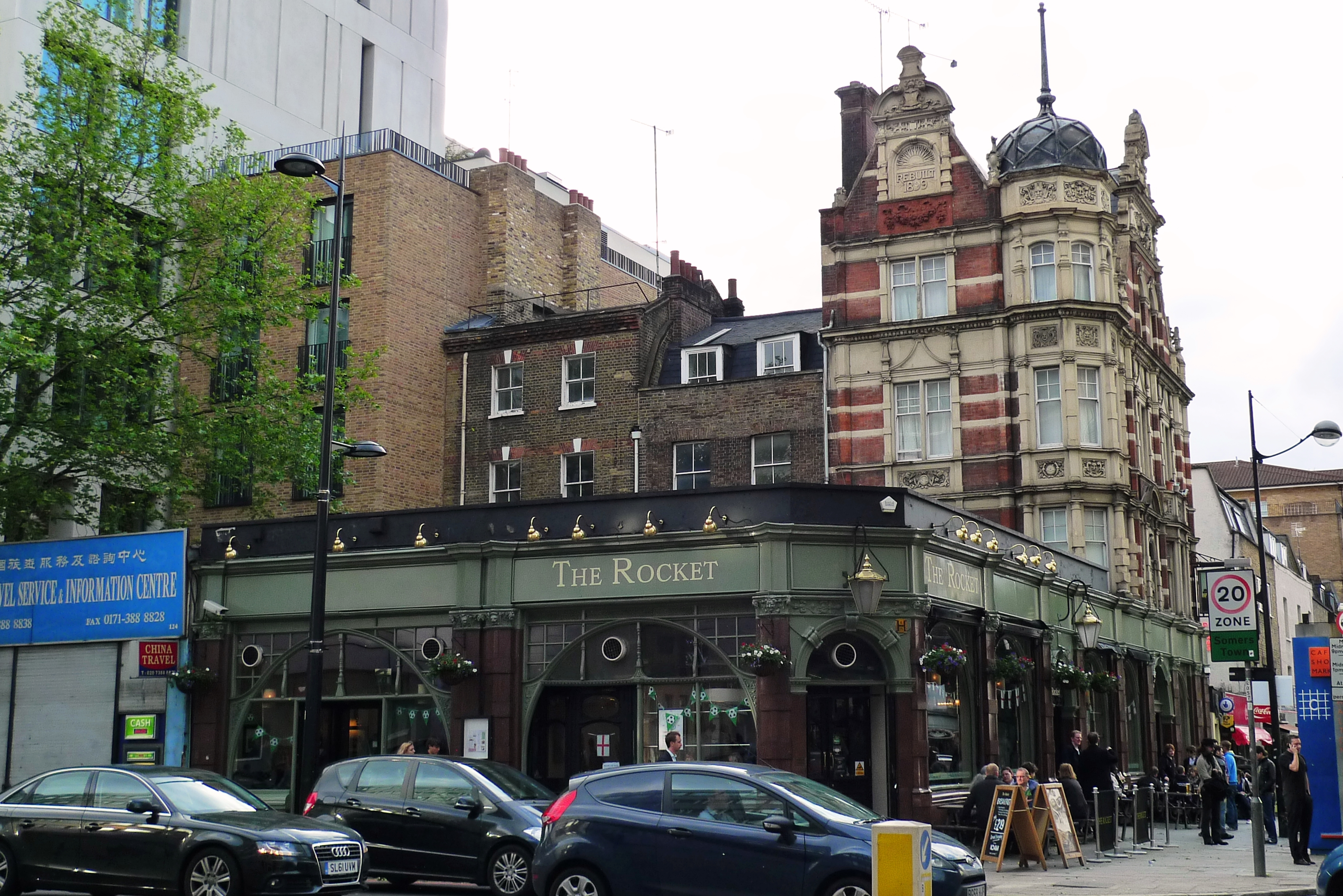
The Rocket

The Rocket (previously The Rising Sun) is a Grade II listed public house at 120 Euston Road, Euston, London NW1 2AL.

It was rebuilt in 1899 by Shoebridge & Rising for the Cannon Brewery.
