= Rising Sun Tavern (North Haven, Connecticut) =

- U.S. National Register of Historic Places
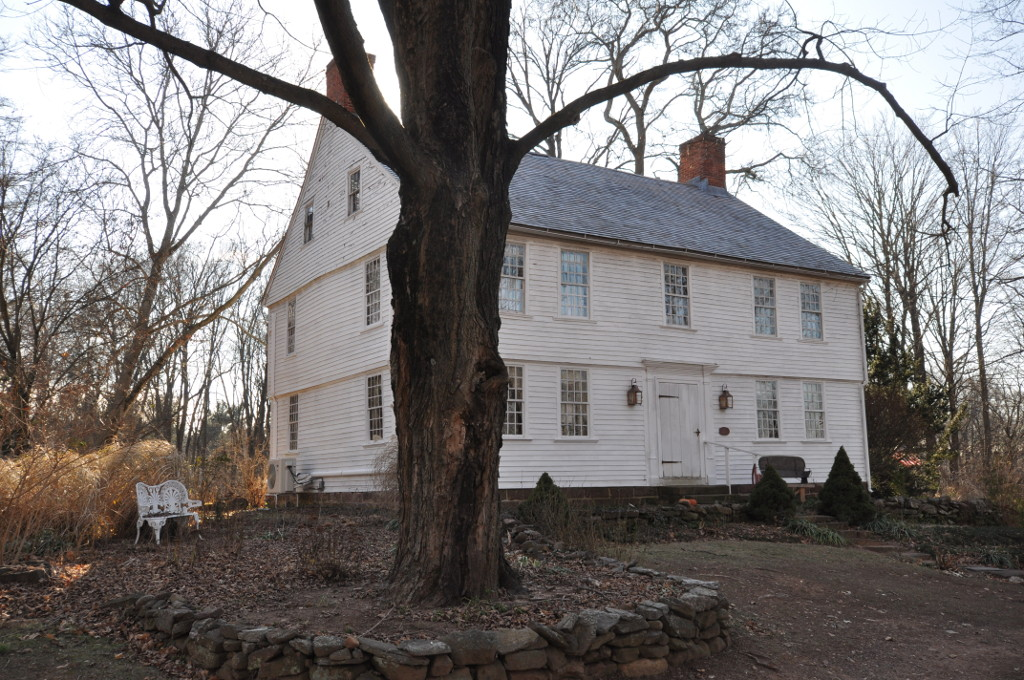

- Location within Connecticut Location within the United States
- Location: Old Tavern Lane, North Haven, Connecticut
- Coordinates: 41°22′20″N 72°49′27″W
- Area: 3.6 acres (1.5 ha)
- Built: 1760
- Architectural style: Georgian
- NRHP reference No.: 79002638
- Added to NRHP: August 21, 1979

The Rising Sun Tavern is a historic house and former public accommodation on Old Tavern Road in North Haven, Connecticut. Probably built around 1760, it is a well-preserved example of an 18th-century tavern house, serving in that role into the mid-19th century. Now a private residence, it was listed on the National Register of Historic Places in 1979.

== Description and history ==
The former Rising Sun Tavern house stands in eastern North Haven, on the south side of Old Tavern Road. The roadway is an old alignment of a major 19th-century north-south turnpike, now bypassed by the modern alignment of Route 17. The tavern is a 2-1/2 story wood frame structure, with a gabled roof, two brick end chimneys, and a clapboarded exterior. The main facade is five bays wide, with sash windows set symmetrically around the center entrance. The entrance is framed by pilasters, which rise to a corniced entablature. The interior of the building follows a typical center hall plan, with a single-run staircase in the central hall, and four chambers, two on either side, on each floor. A single-story kitchen ell extends to the rear of the main block. The property, encompassing more than 3 acres (1.2 ha), is notable for the lack of modern intrusions.

The exact construction date of the house is unknown, but is likely mid-18th century, based on stylistic and documentary evidence. The property includes a sign with a rising sun motif, and naming two of the early tavern proprietors. It is marked with the date 1738, suggesting an active tavern has been standing here since at least then. The owner in 1738 was Caleb Hitchcock, whose family sold the property to Gideon Todd in 1786. The Todd family operated the tavern until its closure in the 1860s. They also served as tolltakers on the Middletown Turnpike (now CT 17) which opened in 1812 and had a toll gate nearby.

== See also ==
- National Register of Historic Places listings in New Haven County, Connecticut
