= Rising Sun (manga) =

Japanese manga series written and illustrated by Satoshi Fujiwara

- First tankōbon volume cover

ライジングサン (Raijingu San)
- Genre: Coming-of-age; Military
- Manga
- Written by: Satoshi Fujiwara
- Published by: Futabasha
- Imprint: Action Comics
- Magazine: Manga Action
- Original run: February 21, 2012 – March 20, 2018
- Volumes: 15
- Manga

Rising Sun R
- Written by: Satoshi Fujiwara
- Published by: Futabasha
- Imprint: Action Comics
- Magazine: Manga Action
- Original run: September 4, 2018 – April 1, 2025
- Volumes: 18

Rising Sun (ライジングサン, Raijingu San) is a Japanese manga series written and illustrated by Satoshi Fujiwara. It was serialized in Futabasha's seinen manga magazine Manga Action from February 2012 to March 2018. A sequel manga, titled Rising Sun R, was serialized in the same magazine from September 2018 to April 2025.

== Synopsis ==
The manga follows the daily life of Ikki Kai, a young man who joins the Japan Ground Self-Defense Force to find his path. Once incorporated with other trainee soldiers, he finds himself in the third combat group to undergo three months of military training under the command of Sergeant Shinkai.

== Publication ==
Written and illustrated by Satoshi Fujiwara, Rising Sun was serialized in Futabasha's seinen manga magazine Manga Action from February 21, 2012, to March 20, 2018. Its chapters were collected into fifteen tankōbon volumes as from July 28, 2012, to June 28, 2018.

A sequel manga, titled Rising Sun R, was serialized in the same magazine from September 4, 2018, to April 1, 2025. The sequel manga's chapters were collected into eighteen tankōbon volumes from December 28, 2018, to May 29, 2025.

=== Volumes ===
==== Rising Sun ====
No.	Release date	ISBN
1	July 28, 2012	978-4-575-84111-4
2	November 28, 2012	978-4-575-84163-3
3	April 26, 2013	978-4-575-84222-7
4	October 28, 2013	978-4-575-84302-6
5	February 28, 2014	978-4-575-84360-6
6	June 27, 2014	978-4-575-84435-1
7	November 28, 2014	978-4-575-84539-6
8	April 28, 2015	978-4-575-84612-6
9	September 28, 2015	978-4-575-84689-8
10	February 27, 2016	978-4-575-84763-5
11	July 28, 2016	978-4-575-84833-5
12	January 28, 2017	978-4-575-84920-2
13	July 28, 2017	978-4-575-85012-3
14	December 28, 2017	978-4-575-85083-3
15	June 28, 2018	978-4-575-85176-2

==== Rising Sun R ====
No.	Release date	ISBN
1	December 28, 2018	978-4-575-85253-0
2	June 27, 2019	978-4-575-85325-4
3	October 28, 2019	978-4-575-85367-4
4	February 28, 2020	978-4-575-85411-4
5	June 26, 2020	978-4-575-85460-2
6	October 28, 2020	978-4-575-85505-0
7	February 27, 2021	978-4-575-85551-7
8	June 28, 2021	978-4-575-85595-1
9	November 27, 2021	978-4-575-85661-3
10	August 25, 2022	978-4-575-85749-8
11	January 26, 2023	978-4-575-85807-5
12	July 27, 2023	978-4-575-85858-7
13	December 27, 2023	978-4-575-85925-6
14	March 28, 2024	978-4-575-85952-2
15	June 27, 2024	978-4-575-85984-3
16	September 26, 2024	978-4-575-86011-5
17	January 23, 2025	978-4-575-86051-1
18	May 29, 2025	978-4-575-86097-9

== Reception ==
By August 2022, the series had over 1.8 million copies in circulation.
