= Rising Sun, Cloth Fair =

Pub in London, England

Coordinates: 51°31′7.92″N 0°05′58.77″W

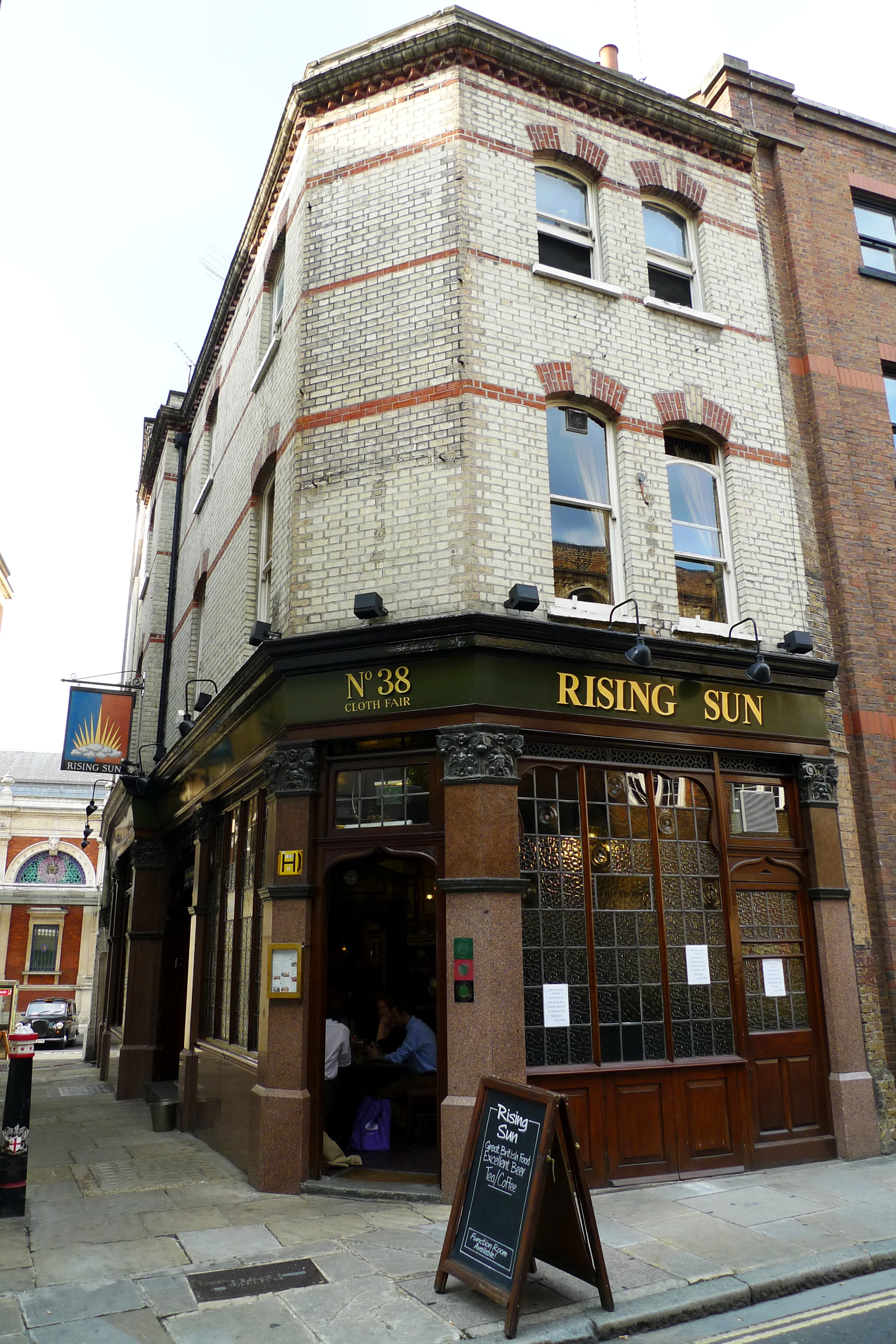
The Rising Sun

The Rising Sun is a historic pub at 38 Cloth Fair in the City of London. John Betjeman was a customer when he lived in nearby Cloth Court.
