= Rising Sun Inn =

Historic house in Maryland, United States

- U.S. National Register of Historic Places
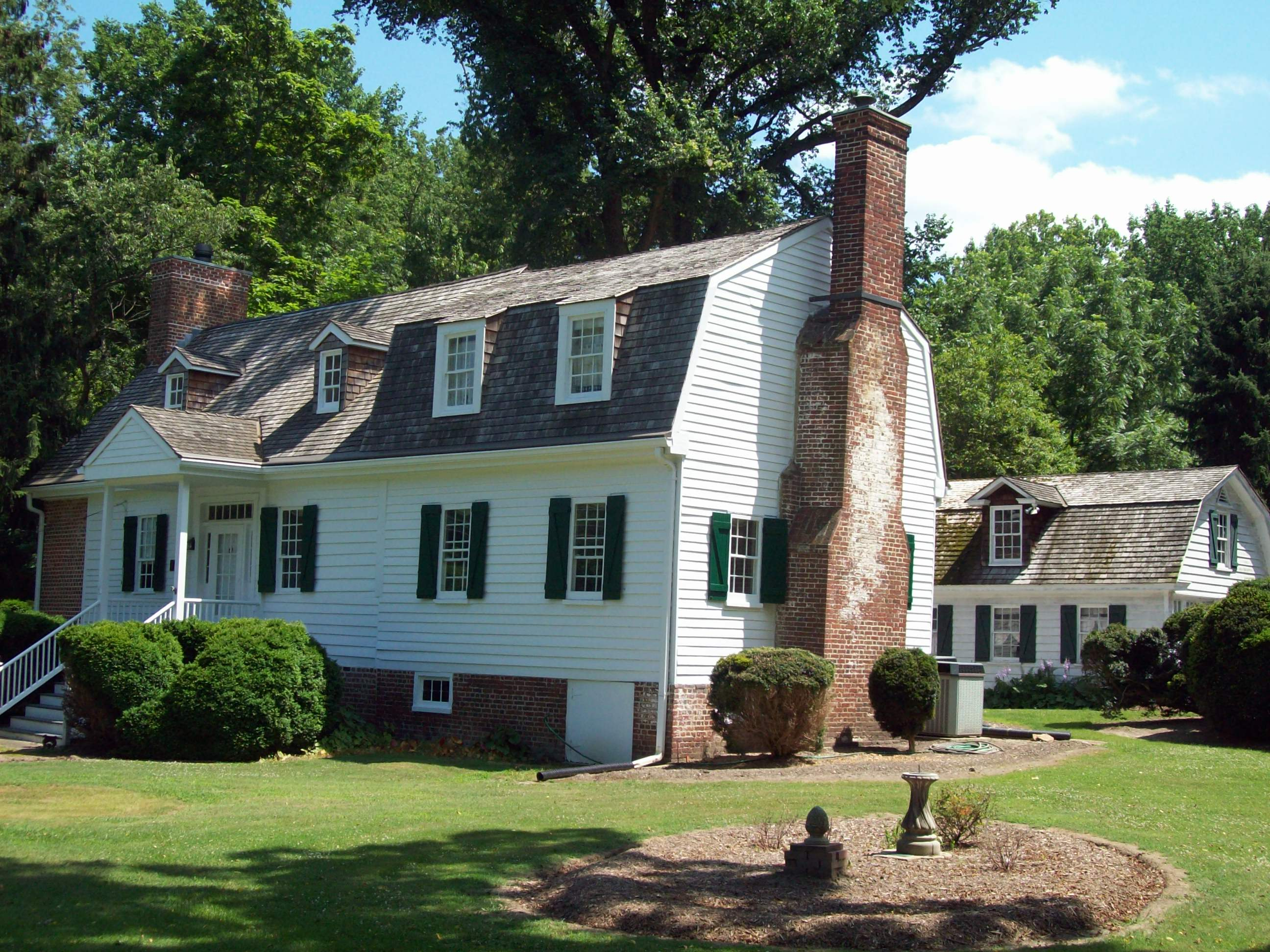
- Rising Sun Inn, July 2009

- Location within Maryland Location within the United States
- Nearest city: Crownsville, Maryland
- Coordinates: 39°2′54″N 76°36′53″W
- Built: 1753
- NRHP reference No.: 85002199
- Added to NRHP: September 12, 1985

The Rising Sun Inn is a historic home in Anne Arundel County, Maryland, United States. It is a mid- and late-18th-century 1 1/2-story frame house. The earlier section dates to about 1753 and is covered with a gable roof and features a brick gable end. In the late 18th century, a frame, one-room gambrel roof wing was added to the northwest gable end of the house. Since 1916, it has been used as the headquarters of the Ann Arundel Chapter of the Daughters of the American Revolution.

The Rising Sun Inn was listed on the National Register of Historic Places in 1985.
