= Xaverian Brothers High School =

Location
- 800 Clapboardtree Street; Westwood, (Norfolk County), Massachusetts 02090; United States; 42°12′53″N 71°11′48″W

Information
- Type: Private, Day, College-prep
- Motto: Latin: Veritatem Fratribus Testari (To bear witness to the truth in brotherhood)
- Religious affiliation: Roman Catholic
- Patron saint: Saint Francis Xavier
- Established: 1963
- Sister school: Ursuline Academy
- School code: XBHS
- CEEB code: 222378
- Chairman of the Board of Trustees: Sean P. Fahy
- Dean: Terrell Diggs
- Principal: Michael Nicholson
- Head of School: Jacob Conca
- Faculty: 120
- Grades: 7–12
- Gender: Boys
- Enrollment: 994 (2024-2025)
- Average class size: 20-22 students
- Student to teacher ratio: 13:1
- Campus: Suburban
- Campus size: 36 acres (150,000 m^{2})
- Colors: Navy Blue and Gold
- Slogan: Redefining Strong
- Athletics: 17 Division 1 sports
- Athletics conference: Catholic Conference
- Mascot: Hawk
- Nickname: Xaverian; XBHS; XB; X
- Rival: St. John's Prep
- Accreditation: New England Association of Schools and Colleges
- Publication: Concordian (literary magazine)
- Yearbook: The Talon
- Tuition: $28,500
- Alumni: 10,000+
- Website: http://www.xbhs.com

Xaverian Brothers High School (XBHS) is a private, Catholic secondary school for boys in grades 7 to 12. Founded in 1963 by the Xaverian Brothers, it is located within a 36-acre (150,000 m^{2}) campus in Westwood, Massachusetts. It is located in the Roman Catholic Archdiocese of Boston. Xaverian is sponsored by the Xaverian Brothers religious order and offers a college preparatory program. The school attracts students from more than 60 communities in eastern Massachusetts and Rhode Island.

== History and tradition ==
Cardinal Cushing officiated the school's dedication ceremony on August 31, 1963, with Xaverian Brothers' provincial Brother Gilroy Bishop, and the first headmaster, Brother Marcellus Feeley. The land that the school stands on today was originally part of the Forbes family estate. The late philanthropist Rocco Zoppo was instrumental in arranging for the Brothers to receive the land. The school's Rocco Zoppo Chapter of the National Honor Society is now named in his honor. The first day of school at XBHS was September 5, 1963 with 251 students, all ninth graders.

Headmasters of XBHS
Years	Headmaster
1963-1966	Marcellus Feeley, C.F.X.
1966-1970	Gilroy Bishop, C.F.X.
1970-1984	William Drinan, C.F.X.
1984-1991	Richard Cook, C.F.X.
1991-2019	Daniel Skala, C.F.X.
2019–Present	Jacob Conca, '94

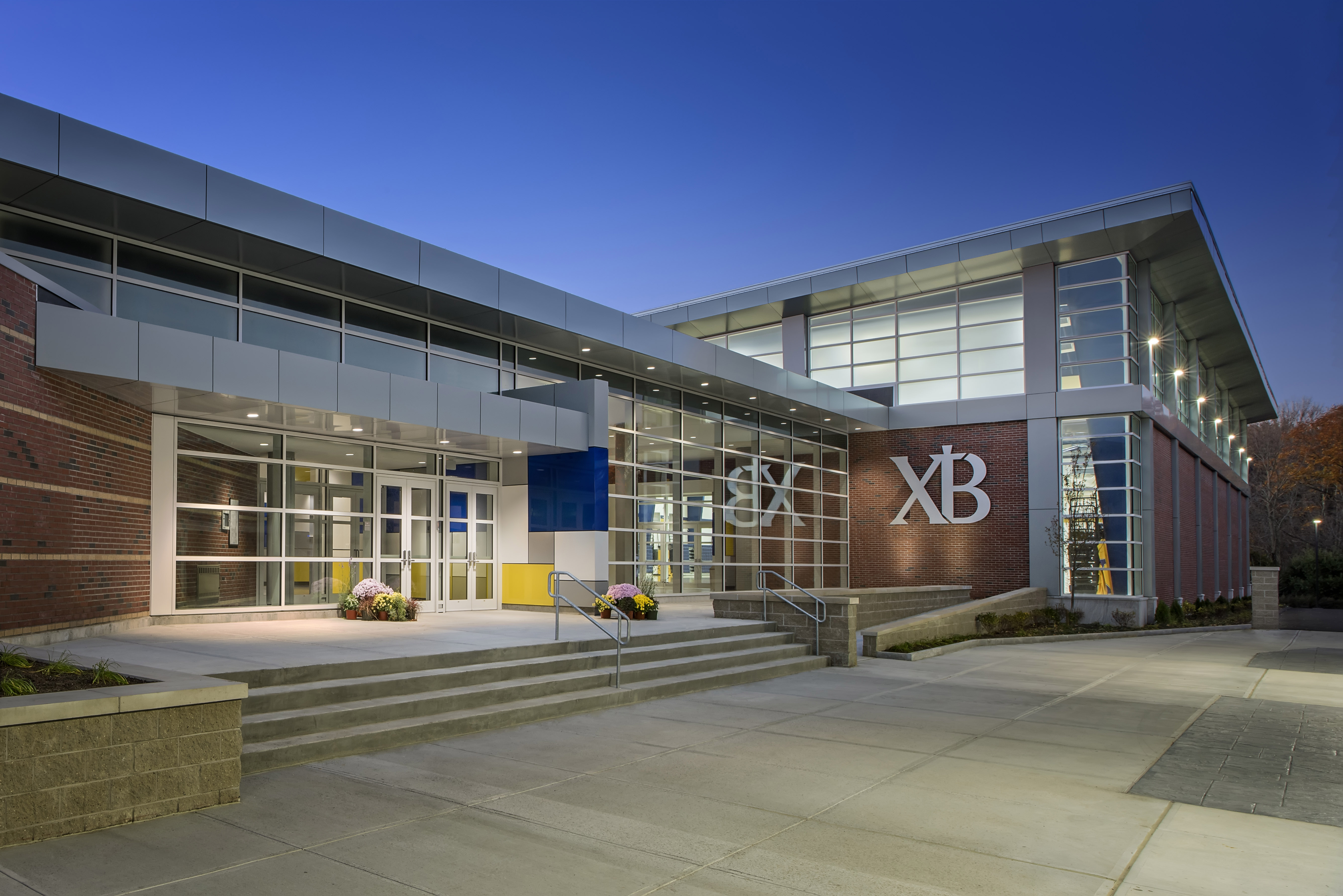
XBHS Scholastic and Wellness Center

== Academics ==
XBHS is a Catholic college preparatory school for boys in grades 7-12. The school is a Xaverian Brothers Sponsored School that enrolls 980 students from more than 60 different communities.

There are Academic Department Centers for Mathematics, English, Social Studies, World Languages, Theology, Computer Science, and three science labs (Biology, Chemistry and Physics).

In 2014, the Francis Xavier Division (grades 7 and 8) was established, bringing in the first-ever 7th grade class.

== Athletics ==
XBHS is a member of the Catholic Conference and is classified as Division 1 in the Massachusetts Interscholastic Athletic Association (MIAA) for a majority of its athletic programs. It sponsors 17 varsity sports - cross country (non-cut), golf, football (non-cut) and soccer during the fall season; alpine skiing (non-cut), basketball, hockey, indoor track (non-cut), swimming (non-cut), and wrestling (non-cut) during the winter season; and baseball, lacrosse, rugby (non-cut), tennis, track & field (non-cut), ultimate frisbee, and volleyball during the spring season. The MIAA has honored Xaverian athletics five times for outstanding sportsmanship. Many Xaverian graduates go on to participate in college athletics and a few alumni are playing among the professional ranks in basketball, football and hockey including James Bailey '75 and Dana Barros '85 in the NBA; Greg Comella '93, Matt Hasselbeck '93, Tim Hasselbeck '96, Drew Strojny '99, Maurice Hurst Jr. '13, and Joe Gaziano '15 in the NFL; and Mark Young '77 in the AHL, and Chris Wagner '09 in the NHL.

=== Athletic Abilities ===
The Hawks' most notable success in athletics has been in alpine skiing, baseball, cross country, golf, football, lacrosse and track & field.

In particular, the football team has brought great notoriety to the school, having won thirteen MIAA Division 1 State Championships in 1966, 1967, 1986, 1994, 1995, 1996, 1998, 2009, 2014, 2015, 2023, 2024, and 2025. The 2015 team was ranked the 22nd best team in nation by USA Today. Further, four Hawks' football players have been selected the Massachusetts Player of the Year by numerous organizations: Greg Comella in 1992, Matt Hasselbeck in 1993, Chris Fox in 2005, Alex Phalen in 2009, Joe Gaziano in 2014, Coby Tippett in 2015, and Henry Hasselbeck in 2023.

== Notable alumni ==
- Gerard Alessandrini (1972) — Tony Award-winning playwright and creator of Forbidden Broadway and Spamilton
- Brendan Burke (2006) — LGBT activist
- Michael Collins (1973) - chancellor of the UMass Chan Medical School
- Dennis Crowley (1994) — co-founder and executive chairman of Foursquare
- Jimmy Cummings (1986) — actor and screenwriter of Southie
- Christopher F. Egan (1982) — United States Ambassador to the Organisation for Economic Co-operation and Development
- Ted English (1971) — executive chairman of Bob's Discount Furniture and former CEO of TJX Companies
- John Ennis (1982) — actor and comedian best known for role on HBO's Mr Show with Bob and David
- Rob Mariano (1994) — TV personality known as "Boston Rob"
- Joe Mulherin (1994) — musician
- Steven McLaughlin — county executive of Rensselaer County
- John J. Sullivan (1977) — United States Ambassador to Russia and 19th United States Deputy Secretary of State
- William F. Sullivan (1975) — associate justice of the Massachusetts Superior Courts
- Ed Thomas (1971) — president and CEO of Tillys
- Pat Walsh (1998) — co-founder & chief impact officer of Classy

Notable alumni distinguishing themselves in athletics include:

- James Bailey (1975) — former National Basketball Association player
- Dana Barros (1985) — former National Basketball Association All-Star player
- John Delaney (2004) — head baseball coach, Quinnipiac University
- Joe Gaziano (2015) — National Football League player, Northwestern University football all-time sacks leader
- Matt Hasselbeck (1993) — former National Football League All-Pro player and ESPN analyst
- Tim Hasselbeck (1996) — former National Football League player and ESPN analyst
- Maurice Hurst Jr. (2013) — National Football League player
- Mark Jackson (1991) — athletic director, Northwestern University
- Matt Klentak (1998) — general manager, Philadelphia Phillies
- Brian Mann (1998) — athletic director, William & Mary; Dartmouth College football single season passing yards leader
- Tim Scannell (1986) — head baseball coach, Trinity University (TX); 2016 DIII National Champion and Coach of the Year
- Drew Strojny (1999) — former National Football League player
- Chris Wagner (2009) — current National Hockey League player
