= William Sullivan =

William Sullivan may refer to:

== Government ==
- William J. Sullivan (1939–2022), American judge on the Connecticut Supreme Court
- William H. Sullivan (1922–2013), United States diplomat
- William Sullivan (Kentucky politician) (1921–2013), Kentucky state senator
- William C. Sullivan (1912–1977), head of the Federal Bureau of Investigation's intelligence operations
- William T. Sullivan (1894–1968), Wisconsin state representative
- Sir Bill Sullivan (politician) (1891–1967), New Zealand minister of labour
- William P. Sullivan (1870–1925), Missouri state representative
- William Wilfred Sullivan (1839–1920), premier of Prince Edward Island
- William V. Sullivan (1857–1918), United States senator from Mississippi
- William F. Sullivan (born 1957), associate justice for the Massachusetts Superior Court
- William R. Sullivan (born 1945), member of the Iowa House of Representatives

== Sports and related ==
- William Sullivan (cricketer) (1877–1924), Australian cricketer
- William Sullivan (field hockey) (1909–1981), Indian field hockey player
- Bill Sullivan (outfielder) (1853–1884), Irish baseball player
- Bill Sullivan (pitcher) (1868–1905), baseball player for the Syracuse Stars
- Billy Sullivan (businessman) (1915–1998), owner of the Boston Patriots, an original franchise of the American Football League
- Billy Sullivan (baseball, born 1875) (1875–1965), major league catcher
- Billy Sullivan Jr. (1910–1994), his son, baseball catcher
- William Sullivan (pitcher) (1864–1911), baseball player for the St. Louis Maroons
- Billy Sullivan (rugby league), Australian rugby league player and coach

== Others ==
- William John Sullivan (born 1976), software freedom activist, hacker, and writer
- William Laurence Sullivan (1872–1935), Unitarian clergyman and author
- William L. Sullivan (author) (born 1953), American author
- William D. Sullivan (born 1950), United States Navy officer
- William Matheus Sullivan (1885–1947), American lawyer and art patron
- William Holmes Sullivan (1836–1908), British painter
- William N. Sullivan (1908–1979), American entomologist
- William Kirby Sullivan (1822–1890), Irish philologist
- Billy Sullivan (actor) (1891–1946), American character actor
- William "Rocky" Sullivan, character in Angels with Dirty Faces
- Bill Sullivan (artist) (1942–2010), American painter, printmaker and publisher

== See also ==
- William O'Sullivan (disambiguation)
