= Classy =

Classy may mean:

- Possessing elegance, the attribute of being tastefully designed, decorated, and maintaining refined grace and dignified propriety
- Classy (company), an American crowdfunding company
- Classy (group), a South Korean girl group
- Classy (magazine), a Japanese women's magazine
