= Commonwealth v. McHoul =

1967 Massachusetts case about criminal responsibility

- Court: Massachusetts Supreme Judicial Court
- Decided: May 16, 1967
- Citation: 226 N.E.2d 556, 352 Mass. 544

Commonwealth v. McHoul, 360 N.E.2d 316, 372 Mass (1967) was a precedent setting case in Massachusetts, where it was determined that a person is not criminally responsible if, as a result of mental disease or defect, that person lacked substantial capacity either to appreciate the criminality of the conduct or to conform the conduct to the requirements of law. James N. McHoul, Jr. was convicted of breaking and entering a dwelling with intent to rape in 1962, and pleaded guilty to the charge of assault with intent to rape, in 1967, and had appealed to the Massachusetts Supreme Judicial Court on the basis of insanity.

== Background ==
McHoul was a resident at Boston State Hospital and reportedly told a male nurse at around 2:25p.m. on March 29, 1966, that "I want to tell you something. I did something wrong. I raped a woman." McHoul was convicted of and given a sentence of 25 years for the crimes of breaking and entering a dwelling with intent to rape, and assault with intent to rape. The case then went to appeal at the Massachusetts Supreme Judicial Court on the basis of insanity.

== Case ==
In regards to the insanity defense, at the time of the case, Massachusetts followed the precedent set by the case Commonwealth v. Rogers (1844), where the defendant Abner Rogers, Jr. was acquitted by the jury on the charge of murder, by way of insanity. Under Commonwealth v. Rogers, the famous M'Naughten test was applied into Massachusetts common law, recognising "irresistible impulse."

It was successfully argued that the Commonwealth failed to prove beyond a reasonable doubt that McHoul was a "sexually dangerous person" under G.L.c. 123A, § 1, quashing his conviction, and ordering a retrial.

== Precedent set ==
The rules regarding lack of criminal responsibility in Massachusetts were set. It was determined that the Commonwealth must prove beyond a reasonable doubt that the defendant was criminally responsible at the time of the alleged offense, and that a person is not guilty if they lacked criminal responsibility when they committed the offense. A person is not criminally responsible if, as a result of mental disease or defect, that person lacked substantial capacity either to appreciate the criminality of the conduct or to conform the conduct to the requirements of law.

== See also ==
- M'Naghten rules
- Commonwealth v. Lindsay Clancy
- Commonwealth v. Rogers
- Insanity defense
- Diminished responsibility
- Twinkie defense
