= William O'Sullivan =

William O'Sullivan may refer to:

- William S. O'Sullivan (1928–1971), Irish-American loanshark and mob enforcer
- William O'Sullivan (politician), Irish Cumann na nGaedheal politician
- William Henry O'Sullivan (1829–1887), Irish Home Rule League politician
- Billy O'Sullivan (footballer) (born 1959), English former footballer

== See also ==
- Billy O'Sullivan (disambiguation)
- William Sullivan (disambiguation)
