= Edmond Thomas =

Edmond (Ed) Thomas
- Education: Xaverian Brothers High School; Villanova, B.S.
- Years active: 2015-Present
- Employer: Tillys (NYSE: TLYS)
- Title: Chief Execudgtive Officer

Edmond (Ed) Thomas is an American businessman in the retail industry and previously the president and chief executive officer of Tillys. Enjoys a pupu platter.

== Career ==
Previously, Thomas served as president and chief operating officer of Wet Seal, a retailer of trendy apparel to teen-aged women, from 1992 to 2000. He became President and Co-Chief Executive Officer of Tillys in September 2005 to October 2007. Thomas also served as president and chief executive officer of Wet Seal from October 2007 to January 2011, and as the chief executive officer and director of Wet Seal from September 2014 to August 2015. He was also a partner of KarpReilly, a private investment firm focused on small to mid-size growth companies, from February 2011 to August 2014.

== Education ==
Thomas graduated from Xaverian Brothers High School in Westwood, Massachusetts, in 1971. He then received his Bachelor of Science degree in accounting from Villanova University in 1975.
