= NCAA Division I men's basketball tournament appearances by seed =

List of college basketball teams based on performance

The NCAA Division I men's basketball tournament is a basketball tournament that has been played annually since 1939. Teams were placed in the tournament based on their records and performance against other teams. The spots in which the teams were placed are referred to as "seeds." When the tournament first started, only eight teams competed in the tournament and seeds were assigned 1–8. As the number of teams in the tournament grew, more seeds were added. Currently, 68 teams compete in the tournament and seeds are assigned 1–16 in four regional brackets. This list is a compilation of the seeds held by teams each time they competed in the tournament.

== Special information ==
- There were eight teams in the tournament from 1939 to 1950
- There were sixteen teams in the tournament in 1951 and 1952
- There were twenty-two teams in the tournament in 1953 and 1966
- There were twenty-three teams in the tournament in 1957, 1959, 1965, 1967, and 1968
- There were twenty-four teams in the tournament in 1954, 1955, 1958, and 1961
- There were twenty-five teams in the tournament in 1956, 1960, 1962, 1963, 1969,1970,1971, and 1972
- There were twenty-six teams in the tournament in 1964
- Teams were assigned seeds 1-8 from 1939 to 1972

== School appearances by seed list ==
- ***year indicates a championship victory
- **year indicates a championship appearance
- *year indicates a final four appearance

School	Seed appearances
Air Force	5: (1960, 1962)
Arizona	6: (1964) 8: (1951)
Arizona State	3: (1961) 4: (1963) 6: (1958, 1962)
Arkansas	1: (1958) 3: (*1941, *1945) 7: (1949)
Baylor	2: (**1948) 3: (*1950) 6: (1946)
Boston College	2: (1967) 5: (1958, 1968)
Boston University	3: (1959)
Bowling Green	4: (1963) 5: (1962) 6: (1959, 1968)
Bradley	2: (**1950) 4: (**1954, 1955)
Brown	8: (1939)
Butler	4: (1962)
BYU	4: (1951, 1957, 1971) 5: (1965, 1969) 6: (1950)
California	1: (1957) 2: (*1946, 1958, ***1959) 4: (**1960)
Canisius	2: (1956) 3: (1955, 1957)
Catholic	8: (1944)
CCNY	1: (***1950) 4: (*1947)
Cincinnati	1: (*1960) 2: (*1959, ***1961, ***1962, **1963, 1966) 3: (1958)
Colorado	1: (1954, 1962, 1963) 2: (*1942, *1955, 1969) 6: (1940) 7: (1946)
Colorado State	2: (1954) 3: (1969) 4: (1965) 5: (1963, 1966)
Columbia	2: (1968) 8: (1948, 1951)
Cornell	1: (1954)
Creighton	3: (1962) 4: (1964) 7: (1941)
Dartmouth	1: (**1942, **1944) 2: (1958) 3: (1956) 5: (1943, 1959) 8: (1941)
Davidson	3: (1966, 1968, 1969) 5: (1970)
Dayton	4: (1965, 1966, **1967) 6: (1952, 1969, 1970)
DePaul	3: (1953, 1965) 4: (*1943, 1959, 1960) 6: (1956)
Detroit	6: (1962)
Drake	1: (*1969) 2: (1970, 1971)
Duke	1: (*1963, 1964, *1966) 4: (1960) 7: (1955)
Duquesne	2: (1952) 4: (*1940, 1969) 5: (1971)
East Carolina	7: (1972)
East Tennessee State	4: (1968)
Eastern Kentucky	5: (1953, 1959) 6: (1965)
Florida State	5: (1968)
Fordham	2: (1971) 5: (1953) 7 (1954)
Furman	7: (1971)
Georgetown	1: (**1943)
Georgia Tech	1: (1960)
Hardin-Simmons	5: (1957) 6: (1953)
Harvard	8: (1946)
Holy Cross	1: (***1947) 3: (1953) 4: (*1948) 5: (1950, 1956)
Houston	1: (1956) 3: (1965, 1966, *1967, *1968, 1970) 4: (1961, 1971)
Idaho State	3: (1957, 1958) 4: (1954, 1959) 5: (1953, 1955, 1956, 1960)
Illinois	1: (*1949, *1951, 1963) 3: (*1952) 5: (1942)
Indiana	1: (***1940) 2: (***1953, 1954, 1957, 1967)
Iowa	1: (**1956, 1970) 2: (*1955)
Iowa State	3: (*1944)
Jacksonville	4: (**1970) 5: (1971)
Kansas	1: (***1952, 1966, *1971) 2: (**1940, **1953, **1957, 1960, 1967) 7: (1942)
Kansas State	1: (**1951, 1959, 1961, 1970) 2: (1956, *1958, *1964) 3: (*1948) 4: (1968)
Kentucky	1: (***1948, 1952, 1955, 1957, ***1958, 1959, 1962, 1964, **1966, 1971) 2: (1956, 1961, 1968, 1969, 1970, 1972) 3: (***1951) 4: (*1942, ***1949) 5: (1945)
La Salle	2: (***1954) 4: (**1955) 7: (1968)
Lafayette	1: (1957)
Lebanon Valley	4: (1953)
Long Beach State	3: (1971) 4: (1970)
Louisville	2: (1968) 4: (*1959, 1961, 1967) 5: (1964) 6: (1951)
Loyola (Chicago)	3: (***1963, 1964) 5: (1968) 6: (1966)
Loyola Marymount	5: (1957, 1958) 6: (1954, 1961)
LSU	1: (*1953, 1954)
Manhattan	3: (1958) 8: (1956)
Marquette	3: (1959, 1968, 1969, 1971, 1972) 4: (1955) 5: (1961)
Marshall	5: (1956)
Maryland	4: (1958)
Memphis	6: (1955, 1956, 1962)
Miami	6: (1960)
Miami (OH)	4: (1958, 1969) 5: (1955, 1966) 6: (1953, 1957, 1971)
Michigan	1: (**1965) 2: (*1964, 1966) 5: (1948)
Michigan State	2: (*1957, 1959)
Minnesota	1: (1972)
Mississippi State	2: (1963)
Missouri	7: (1944)
Montana State	6: (1951)
Morehead State	3: (1961) 4: (1956) 5: (1957)
Murray State	6: (1964, 1969)
Navy	2: (1959) 4: (1954) 6: (1960) 8: (1947)
NC State	1: (1965, 1970) 3: (1954) 4: (*1950, 1951) 5: (1952) 7: (1956)
New Mexico	4: (1968)
New Mexico State	3: (1968) 4: (1969, *1970) 5: (1952, 1959, 1967, 1971) 6: (1960)
Niagara	2: (1970)
North Carolina	1: (*1967, **1968, *1969, *1972) 2: (***1957) 4: (**1946) 5: (1941) 7: (1959)
Notre Dame	3: (1954, 1957, 1958, 1970, 1971) 4: (1953, 1965) 5: (1960, 1963, 1969)
NYU	1: (**1945) 2: (*1960) 3: (1962) 4: (1963) 5: (1946) 8: (1943)
Ohio	4: (1960, 1964) 5: (1961, 1965) 6: (1970)
Ohio State	1: (*1946, *1968) 2: (***1960, **1962, 1971) 4: (**1939, *1944, *1945) 8: (1950)
Oklahoma	2: (**1947) 7: (*1939, 1943)
Oklahoma City	3: (1953, 1956, 1965) 4: (1957, 1963) 5: (1954, 1955, 1964, 1966) 7: (1952)
Oklahoma State	1: (1953, **1961, 1965) 2: (***1945, 1954) 3: (***1946, **1949, *1951) 4: (1958)
Oregon	3: (***1939, 1960) 5: (1961) 6: (1945)
Oregon State	1: (1955) 2: (*1949, 1966) 3: (*1963) 4: (1962) 5: (1964) 7: (1947)
Pacific	2: (1967, 1971) 4: (1966)
Penn	1: (1953) 3: (1972) 4: (1971) 7: (1970)
Penn State	3: (1955) 4: (*1954) 5: (1965) 8: (1942, 1952)
Pepperdine	1: (1962) 6: (1944)
Pittsburgh	4: (*1941, 1957) 5: (1958, 1963)
Portland	5: (1959)
Princeton	1: (1955) 2: (1964) 4: (1961, *1965, 1967) 5: (1960) 7: (1952, 1963, 1969)
Providence	2: (1965) 5: (1964, 1966) 6: (1972)
Purdue	1: (**1969)
Rhode Island	6: (1961, 1966)
Rice	3: (1954) 5: (1970) 6: (1942) 7: (1940)
Saint Joseph's	1: (1959, 1960, *1961, 1962) 2: (1963) 3: (1965) 4: (1966) 5: (1969) 6: (1971)
Saint Louis	1: (1957) 4: (1952)
Saint Mary's	1: (1959)
San Francisco	1: (1958) 2: (***1956, *1957, 1963, 1964, 1965) 3: (1955)
San Jose State	5: (1951)
Santa Clara	1: (1960, 1968) 2: (1969, 1970) 3: (*1952, 1953, 1954)
Seattle	4: (1953, 1955, 1956, *1958, 1961, 1964) 5: (1954, 1962, 1967) 6: (1963, 1969)
SMU	1: (1955, 1967) 3: (1957) 4: (*1956, 1966) 5: (1965)
South Carolina	1: (1971) 4: (1972)
Springfield	8: (1940)
St. Bonaventure	3: (1961) 4: (1968, *1970)
St. John's	2: (1951, 1969) 3: (1967) 4: (**1952) 6: (1968) 7: (1961)
Stanford	3: (***1942)
Syracuse	2: (1966) 4: (1957)
TCU	1: (1968) 3: (1959) 4: (1953) 6: (1971) 8: (1952)
Temple	1: (*1958) 4: (*1956) 5: (1944, 1967, 1972) 6: (1964, 1970)
Tennessee	1: (1967)
Tennessee Tech	6: (1958, 1963)
Texas	3: (*1943, *1947, 1960, 1963) 6: (1939)
Texas A&M	4: (1969) 6: (1964) 7: (1951)
Texas Tech	3: (1961) 4: (1962) 5: (1956) 6: (1954)
Toledo	5: (1954) 6: (1967)
Trinity (TX)	5: (1969)
Tufts	8: (1945)
Tulsa	3: (1955)
UCLA	1: (1963, ***1964, ***1965, ***1967, ***1969, ***1970, ***1971) 2: (*1962, ***1968) 3: (1956) 6: (1952) 7: (1950)
UConn	1: (1956) 3: (1964) 5: (1954, 1957) 6: (1959, 1963, 1965, 1967) 7: (1951, 1958, 1960)
UMass	6: (1962)
USC	1: (*1954) 2: (1961) 3: (*1940) 7: (1960)
Utah	1: (1956, *1961, *1966) 2: (***1944, 1955, 1960) 3: (1959) 7: (1945)
Utah State	2: (1939) 3: (1962, 1964, 1970) 5: (1963, 1971)
UTEP	3: (1964, ***1966, 1967) 6: (1963, 1970) 6: 1970
Vanderbilt	2: (1965)
Villanova	1: (*1939) 2: (1955, 1962, 1972) 3: (1970, **1971) 4: (1964) 5: (1949, 1951) 6: (1969)
VMI	7: (1964)
Virginia Tech	3: (1967)
Wake Forest	2: (1953, 1961) 4: (*1962) 5: (1939)
Washington	1: (*1953) 2: (1951) 5: (1961) 6: (1943, 1954) 7: (1948)
Washington State	2: (**1941)
Wayne State	3: (1956)
Weber State	3: (1969) 5: (1968, 1970) 6: (1971)
Western Kentucky	3: (1960, 1962, 1966) 4: (*1971) 5: (1940, 1967, 1970)
West Texas State	6: (1955)
West Virginia	3: (1960, 1963) 4: (**1959) 5: (1955) 6: (1956, 1957, 1958) 7: (1962, 1965)
Wichita State	1: (1964, *1965)
Williams	6: (1955)
Wisconsin	1: (***1941) 5: (1947)
Wyoming	2: (***1943, 1952, 1953) 4: (1967) 5: (1958) 6: (1941, 1947, 1948, 1949)
Xavier	6: (1961)
Yale	5: (1962) 7: (1957) 8: (1949)
