= Scott Chisholm =

Scott Chisholm may refer to:

- Scot Chisholm (entrepreneur) (born 1981), American social entrepreneur
- Scott Chisholm (footballer) (born 1973), Australian footballer
- Scott Chisholm (actor) (born 1993), British actor
