= Billy O'Sullivan =

Billy O'Sullivan may refer to:

- Billy O'Sullivan (hurler)
- William S. O'Sullivan, American loanshark and enforcer for Donald Killeen, the head of the Irish mob in South Boston
- Billy O'Sullivan (footballer)
- Billy O'Sullivan (actor)

== See also ==
- William O'Sullivan (disambiguation)
