= Maurice Hurst II =

American football player (born 1995)

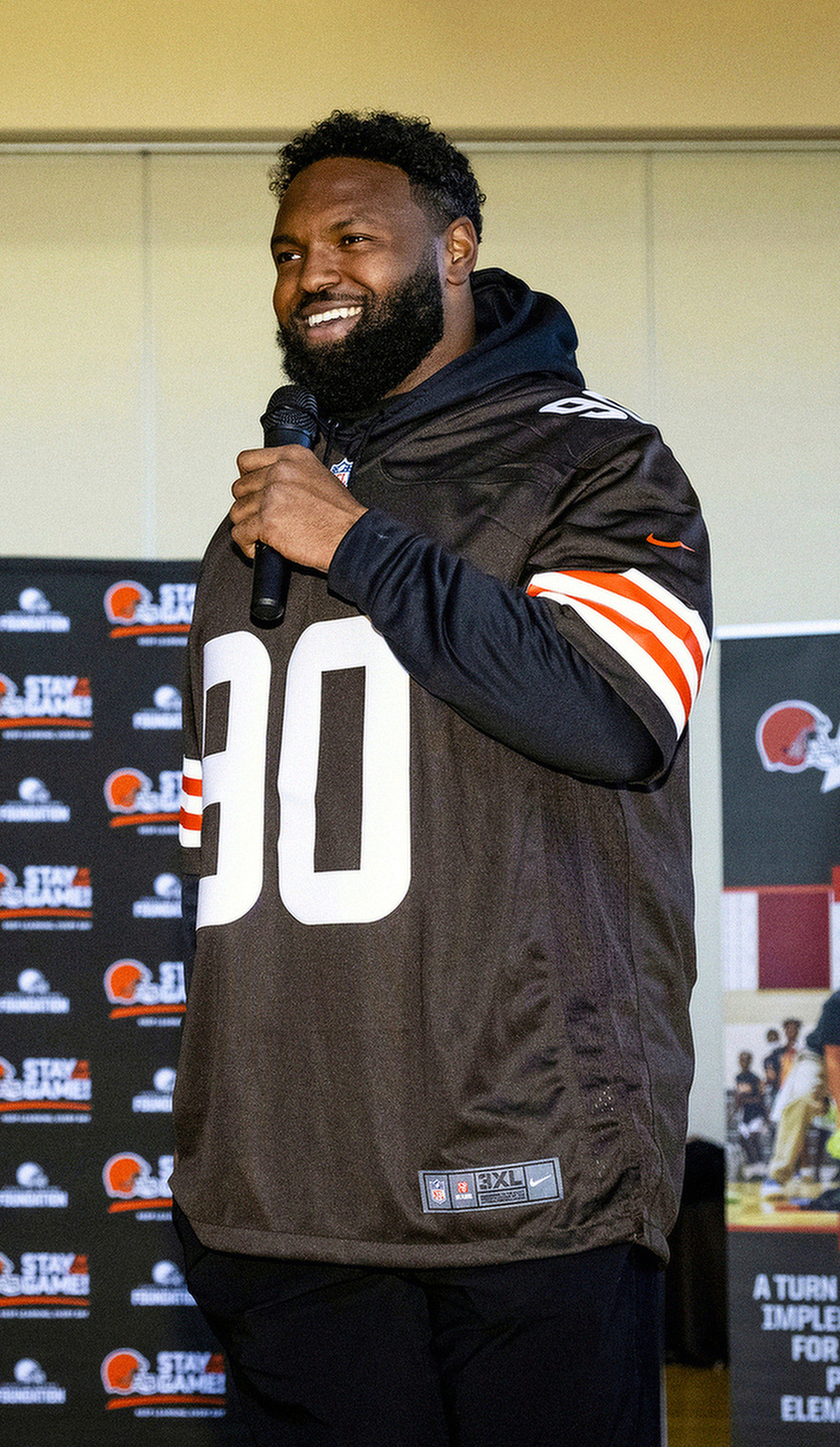
- Hurst with the Cleveland Browns 2023

Profile
- Position: Defensive tackle

Personal information
- Born: May 9, 1995 (age 31); Canton, Massachusetts, U.S.
- Listed height: 6 ft 1 in (1.85 m)
- Listed weight: 291 lb (132 kg)

Career information
- High school: Xaverian Brothers (Westwood, Massachusetts)
- College: Michigan (2013–2017)
- NFL draft: 2018: 5th round, 140th overall pick

Career history
- Oakland / Las Vegas Raiders (2018–2020); San Francisco 49ers (2021–2022); Cleveland Browns (2023–2025); Washington Commanders (2026)*
- * Offseason or practice squad member only

Awards and highlights
- Consensus All-American (2017)

Career NFL statistics as of 2025
- Tackles: 117
- Sacks: 10
- Forced fumbles: 1
- Fumble recoveries: 3
- Pass deflections: 11
- Interceptions: 2
- Stats at Pro Football Reference

Maurice Roy Hurst II (born May 9, 1995) is an American professional football defensive tackle. Hurst played college football for the Michigan Wolverines and selected by the Oakland Raiders in the fifth round of the 2018 NFL draft. He has also played for the San Francisco 49ers, Cleveland Browns, and Washington Commanders.

== Early life ==
Hurst grew up in Canton, Massachusetts, where he was raised by his mother. He is the son of former New England Patriot Maurice Hurst. He graduated from Xaverian Brothers High School in Westwood, Massachusetts, where he was a three-year starter for the varsity football team, playing on the varsity team as a freshman. Hurst was a two-time first-team all-state player in Massachusetts during the 2011 and 2012 seasons and participated in the 2013 Semper Fidelis All-American Bowl.

== College career ==
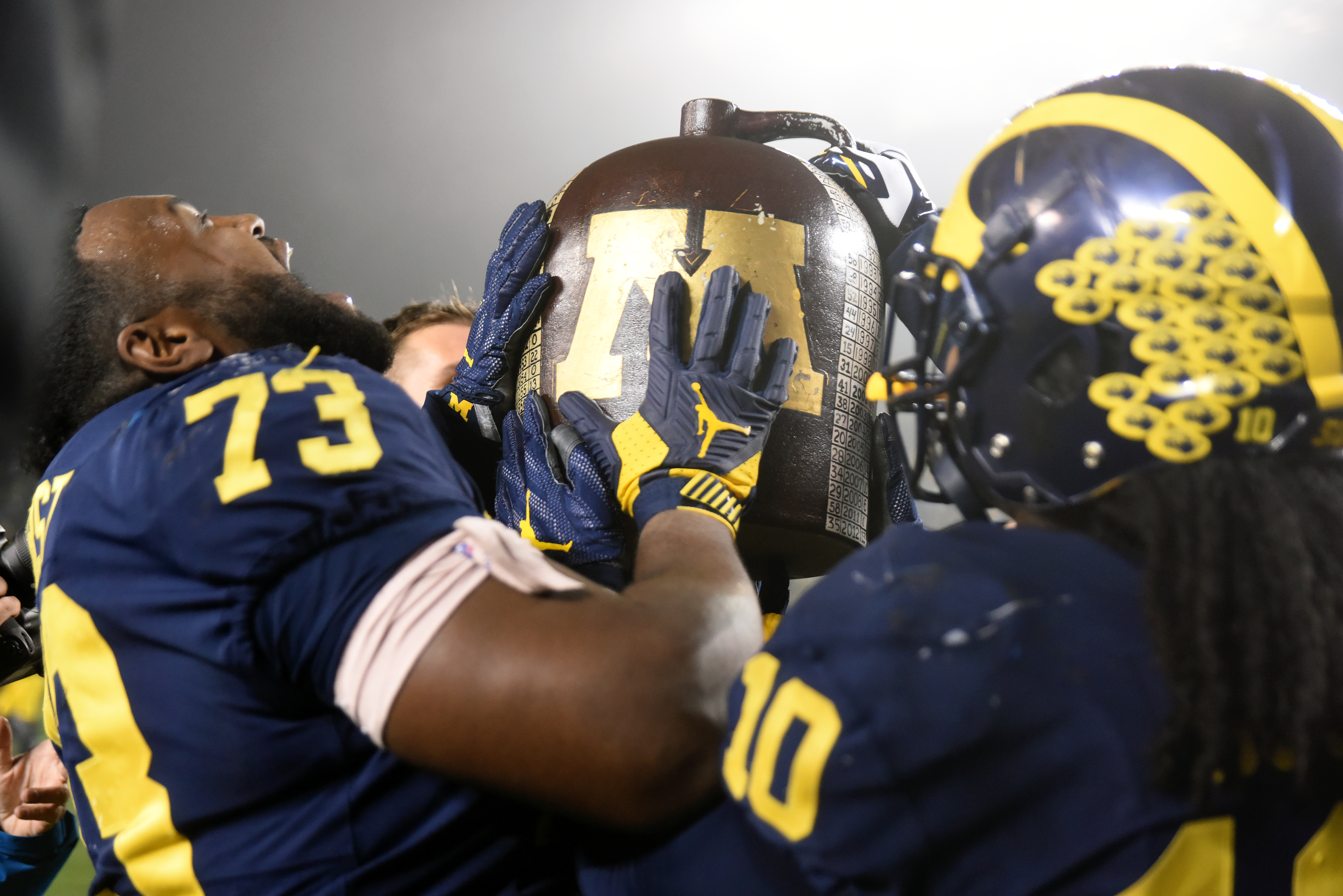
Hurst (left) with the Michigan Wolverines in 2017

In 2014, Hurst earned his first varsity letter after appearing in seven games. On September 24, 2016, Hurst was a Pro Football Focus College Big Ten Team of the Week honoree for his six tackles and 1 sack performance against Penn State. Hurst garnered Academic All-Big Ten recognition in 2014 and 2015.

During the 2017 season, Hurst set a career high in tackles with 59, while his 13.5 tackles for loss ranked sixth in the conference. Following the 2017 season, Hurst was named to the All-Big Ten defensive first-team by both the coaches and the media.

== Professional career ==
Pre-draft measurables
Height	Weight	Arm length	Hand span	Wingspan	40-yard dash	10-yard split	20-yard split	20-yard shuttle	Three-cone drill	Vertical jump	Broad jump	Bench press
6 ft 1 1/4 in (1.86 m)	292 lb (132 kg)	32 in (0.81 m)	9 1/2 in (0.24 m)	6 ft 4 7/8 in (1.95 m)	4.98 s	1.73 s	2.76 s	4.59 s	7.71 s	31.0 in (0.79 m)	8 ft 8 in (2.64 m)	29 reps
All values from NFL Combine/Pro Day

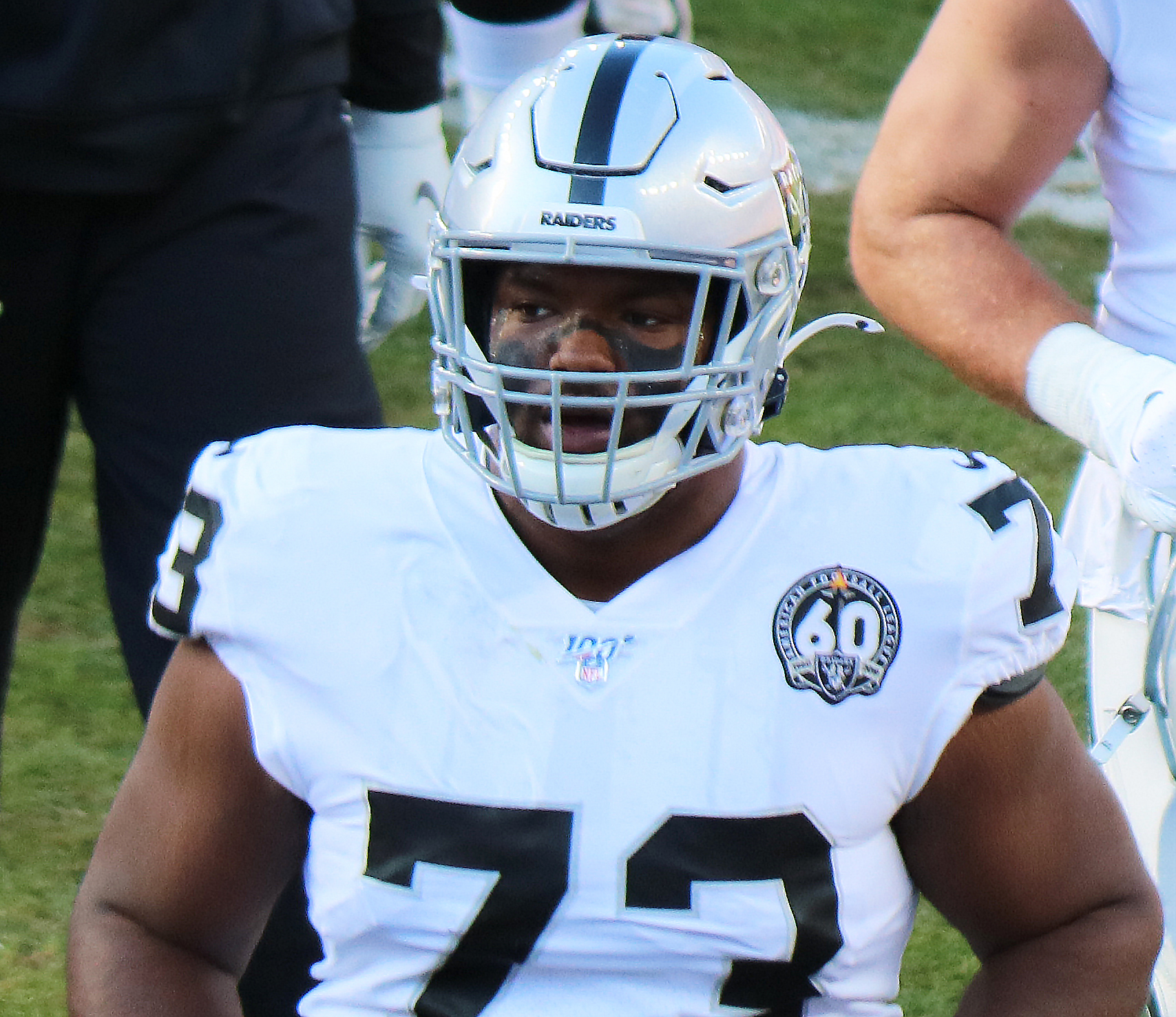
Hurst with the Oakland Raiders in 2019

Hurst was invited to the 2018 NFL Combine, but could not participate after being diagnosed with a heart condition. Despite the condition, he was cleared to play football and participate in Michigan's pro day. Hurst was projected to be anywhere from the top 5 to a mid first-round pick, but due to his heart condition, his draft stock plummeted.

=== Oakland / Las Vegas Raiders ===
Hurst was selected by the Oakland Raiders in the fifth round (140th overall) of the 2018 NFL draft. In Week 2 of his rookie season, he recorded his first career sack against the Denver Broncos. In Week 4 against the Cleveland Browns, Hurst sacked quarterback Baker Mayfield in a 45–42 overtime win. In Week 10 against the Los Angeles Chargers, Hurst made his third sack of the season off quarterback Philip Rivers in a 20–6 loss. In Week 11 against the Arizona Cardinals, Hurst sacked Josh Rosen in a 23–21 win. He received an overall grade of 72.4 from Pro Football Focus in 2018, which ranked as the 46th highest grade among all qualifying interior defenders.

In week 5 of the 2019 season against the Chicago Bears, Hurst sacked quarterback Chase Daniel twice in the 24–21 win. In week 9 against the Detroit Lions, Hurst recovered a fumble lost by Matthew Stafford in the 31–24 win. In week 11 against the Cincinnati Bengals, Hurst recovered a fumble forced by teammate Maxx Crosby on Ryan Finley in the 17–10 win. In week 14 against the Tennessee Titans, Hurst recorded his first career interception off a pass thrown by Ryan Tannehill and made a 55-yard return during the 42–21 loss.

Hurst was placed on the reserve/COVID-19 list by the Raiders on October 6, 2020, and activated from the list on October 20. Hurst was waived after the season on April 15, 2021.

=== San Francisco 49ers ===
On April 23, 2021, Hurst signed a one-year contract with the San Francisco 49ers. He was placed on injured reserve on September 1, 2021. He was activated from injured reserve on October 2.

On March 10, 2022, Hurst re-signed with the 49ers. He was released by the team on April 11, but re-signed on a one-year deal the same day. He was placed on injured reserve on August 1, 2022 with a torn bicep, ending his season.

=== Cleveland Browns ===
On March 18, 2023, Hurst signed a one-year contract with the Browns. He played in 13 games, recording 22 tackles, 1.5 sacks, three passes defensed and an interception.

On March 15, 2024, Hurst re-signed with the Browns. He suffered an ankle injury in Week 1 and was placed on injured reserve on September 11, 2024. Hurst was activated on October 12.

On December 10, 2025, Hurst was signed to Cleveland's practice squad.

=== Washington Commanders ===
On August 18, 2026, Hurst signed with the Washington Commanders. On August 30, he was waived by Washington as a part of final roster cuts before the start of the regular season.
