= Edmond J. English =

American businessman (born 1953)

Edmond (Ted) J. English
- Born: April 25, 1953 (age 73)
- Education: Xaverian Brothers High School; Northeastern, B.A.
- Years active: 2006–2016; 2000–2005
- Employer(s): Bob's Discount Furniture; TJX Companies (NYSE: TJX)
- Title: Executive chairman

Edmond (Ted) J. English (born April 25, 1953) is an American businessman in the retail industry. English is currently the executive chairman of Bob's Discount Furniture and previously the CEO of the TJX Companies.

== Career ==
English started his more than 40-year career in the retail industry working as a stock boy at Filene's Basement in Boston, Massachusetts. In 1983, English joined the TJX Companies as a buyer and eventually rose to serve as its president and chief executive officer from January 2000 to September 2005. Under his leadership, the TJX Companies added over 900 stores, 50,000 employees and revenue increased from $8.9 billion to $15 billion. English then served as the chief executive officer of Bob's Discount Furniture from November 2006 until March 2016. Under his leadership, Bob's Discount Furniture more than doubled the store base and nearly tripled sales, placing it among the top 15 furniture stores in the U.S. He has been the executive chairman of Bob's Discount Furniture since March 2016.

== Civic recognition ==
English has been recognized by numerous organizations for his work in the corporate arena and the community, and was awarded an honorary Doctor of Laws degree from Framingham State University for his leadership when seven TJX associates were killed in the September 11 terrorist attacks. English was also on the founding board of the national Welfare to Work Partnership, creating over 30,000 jobs at TJX for former welfare recipients, and was recognized as the Humanitarian of the Year by the Cardinal Cushing Centers for his work with children with special needs.

== Education ==
English graduated from Xaverian Brothers High School in Westwood, Massachusetts, in 1971. He then received his bachelor's degree from Northeastern University in 1976. In 2010, Northeastern University recognized English with its Outstanding Alumni Award.

== Personal life ==
English is a member of the honorary board of directors for the Special Olympics of Massachusetts, a member of the board of the New England Chapter of Autism Speaks, a member of the board of trustees of the Boston Medical Center, and a member of the board of trustees at Northeastern University. He is a former member of the board of trustees at Xaverian Brothers High School.
