= Scot Chisholm =

American social entrepreneur

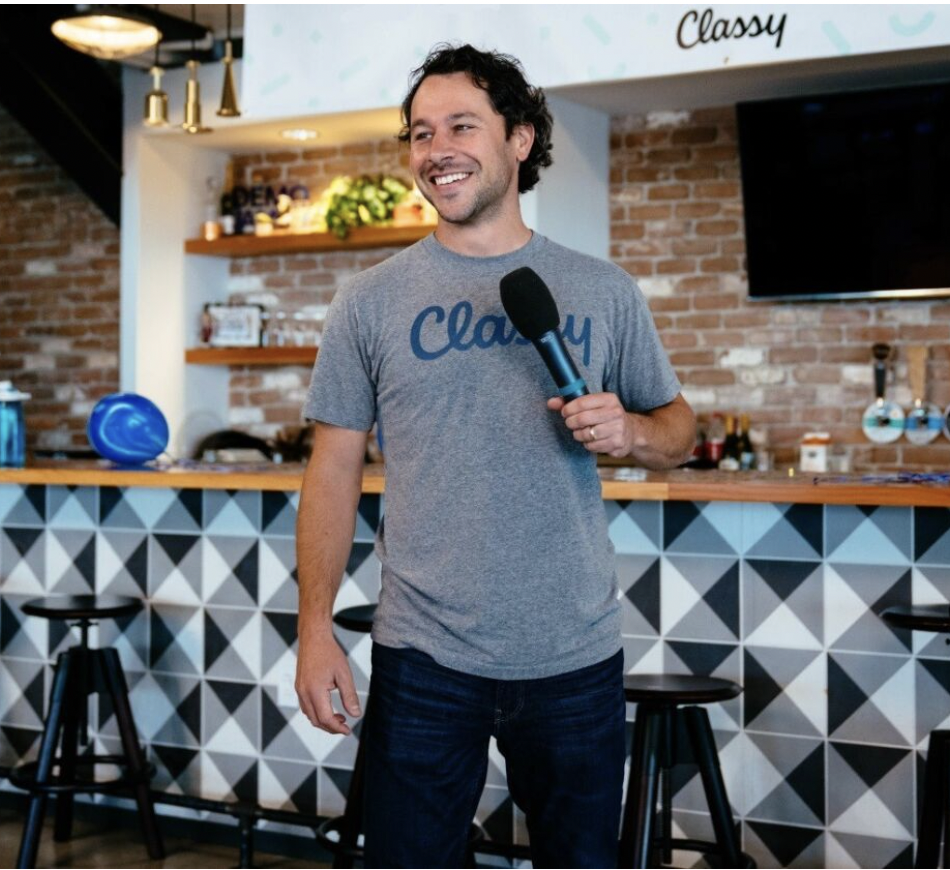
- Born: June 15, 1981
- Education: UMass Amherst; University of Manchester
- Occupations: Entrepreneur, Investor, Industrial Engineer
- Known for: Classy, GoFundMe, Highland, Northstar Operating System, JustClaims, Haskill Creek
- Spouse: Carolyn Garner Chisholm
- Children: 2 sons
- Website: https://scotchisholm.com/

Scot Chisholm (born June 15, 1981) is an American businessman, best known as the co-founder and former chief executive offer of Classy, a fundraising software company for nonprofit organizations. Chisholm was named one of Glassdoor's 'Highest Rated CEOs' in 2017 for small and medium-sized businesses, and served as CEO until 2021. In 2022, Classy was acquired by GoFundMe. As of 2025, the companies had collectively raised over $40 billion for individual and nonprofit causes.

Chisholm also founded Highland, a CEO coaching program and community for startup founders, Haskill Creek, a modern health and wellness retail brand, and Save Farmland, a nonprofit organization focused on protecting agricultural land. He is the co-owner of Albion Soccer Club, a youth soccer organization in the United States, alongside partner Noah Gins.

Chisholm is also the creator of the Northstar Operating System, a business operating system (BOS), used by early-stage and growth-stage companies.

== Early life ==
Chisholm was born in Weymouth, Massachusetts, and raised in Hull and Hingham. He graduated from Hingham High School and later earned a degree in Industrial Engineering and Operations Research, from the University of Massachusetts, Amherst in 2004.

== Career ==
=== Early career ===
Following graduation, Chisholm worked as a senior consultant at Booz Allen Hamilton in San Diego, California, where he participated in the development of the firm's Lean Six Sigma practice on the Economic and Business Analysis Team, from 2004 to 2007.

=== Classy ===
In 2006, Chisholm founded Classy with his college friend Pat Walsh. The idea originated from a local charity pub crawl in San Diego, inspired by the movie Anchorman, aimed at raising money for cancer research Over time, the charity events evolved into a software platform for nonprofit fundraising, and Classy was formally launched in 2011 as a technology company.

By 2021, organizations were raising over $1 billion annually through Classy. The company raised more than $200 million in venture funding from investors including Bullpen Capital, Salesforce Ventures, Mithril Capital, JMI Equity and Norwest Venture Partners. In January 2022, Classy was acquired by GoFundMe. Chisholm transitioned into an advisory role following the acquisition.

=== Highland ===
In 2024, Chisholm launched Highland, a CEO coaching program and professional community designed for startup founders.

=== Northstar Operating System ===
Chisholm developed the Northstar Operating System (NOS), a business operating system designed to help businesses scale. It is marketed as an alternative to the Entrepreneurial Operating System (EOS) and Objectives and Key Results (OKRs).

=== JustClaims ===
In 2025, Chisholm co-founded JustClaims, an adjusting firm, with Chris Himes. The company represents property owners in insurance claim disputes, using AI to advocate for their interests.

=== Haskill Creek ===
In 2021, Chisholm launched Haskill Creek with his wife, Carrie, and high school friend Craig McViney. Haskill Creek is a health retailer, offering wellness products such as supplements, organic beauty items and herbal remedies. Haskill Creek opened its first store in Whitefish, Montana.

=== Save Farmland ===
In 2021, the owners of Haskill Creek painted “Save Farmland” on the side of their building to raise awareness for the disappearing farmland across Flathead County, Montana. In 2022, Chisholm launched Save Farmland, the 501(c)(3) nonprofit organization focused on protecting agricultural land.

=== Board roles ===
Chisholm has served on several nonprofit and organizational boards, including:

- Team Rubicon (2011–2015) - which connects skilled military veterans with medical professionals to form teams that respond better to disaster situations.
- Street Soccer USA (2017–2021) - a nonprofit organization that uses sports to improve health, education, and employment outcomes for disadvantaged Americans.
- Nature Conservancy California (2018–2023) - a nonprofit working to protect the lands and waters on which all life depends.
- Abundant Montana (2023–present) - a nonprofit organization that connects Montanans with local food and farms.
- Save Farmland (2022–present) - an agricultural conservation nonprofit that he founded in 2022.

== Recognition ==
In 2017, he was named 'Top Rated CEO' in the United States for small and medium-sized businesses by Glassdoor.

In 2018, he was named an Ernst & Young 'Entrepreneur of the Year' finalist.

Chisholm was recognized as one of the '500 Most Influential Business Leaders in San Diego' by San Diego Business Journal in 2017, 2018, 2019, 2020, 2021 and 2022.

In 2024, Chisholm was named a 'Top Executive Coach' by Real Leaders, as part of the Real Leaders Impact Awards.
