= Bob's Discount Furniture =

American furniture store

Coordinates: 41°48′30″N 72°31′25″W

Bob's Discount Furniture, Inc.
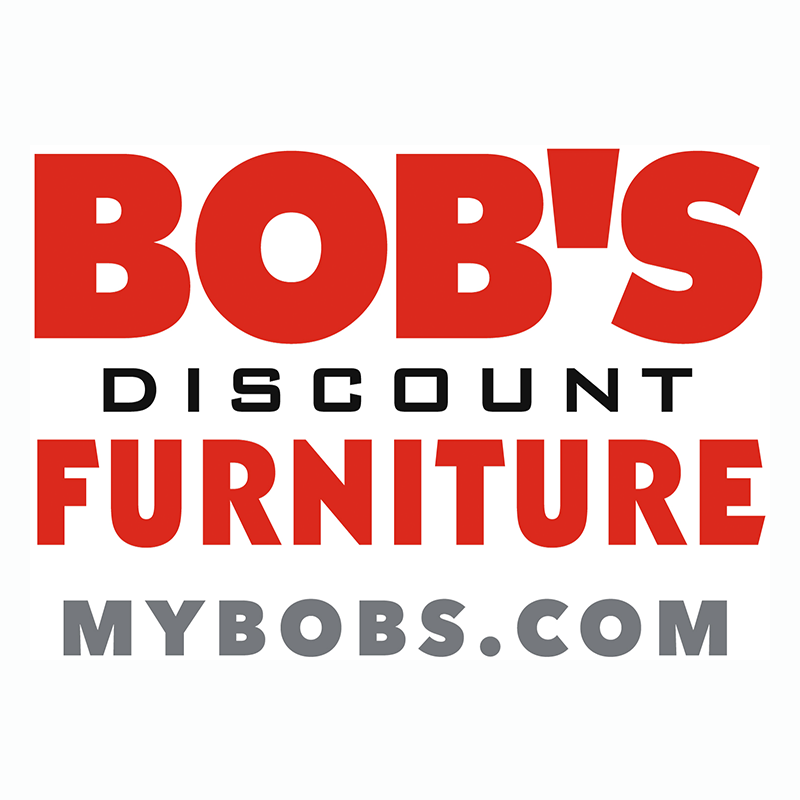
- Type: Public
- Traded as: NYSE: BOBS
- Industry: Furniture retail
- Founded: December 13, 1991; 34 years ago in Newington, Connecticut
- Founders: Bob Kaufman; Gene Rosenberg
- Headquarters: Manchester, Connecticut, United States
- Number of locations: 211 stores (2026)
- Area served: Mid-Atlantic; Midwest; Northeast; West Coast
- Key people: Edmond J. English (executive chairman); Bill Barton (president & CEO); Ramesh Murthy (COO); Carl Lukach (CFO)
- Products: Furniture; Bedding; Mattresses
- Revenue: ▲US$2.028 billion (2024)
- Owners: Bob Kaufman (33%; 1991-2005); Gene Rosenberg (66%; 1991-2005); Saunders Karp & Megrue (70%; 2005); Apax Partners Worldwide (70%; 2005-2013); Bain Capital (majority; 2013-present)
- Number of employees: 5,800 (2025)
- Subsidiaries: BDF Intermediate, LLC (Delaware); BDF Acquisition Corp (Delaware); Bob’s Discount Furniture, LLC (Massachusetts)
- Website: www.mybobs.com

Bob's Discount Furniture, Inc. is an American furniture store chain headquartered in Manchester, Connecticut. The company opened its first store in 1991 in Newington, Connecticut and is ranked 7th in sales among United States furniture stores according to Furniture Today's list of Top 100 Furniture Stores. As of January 2026, the company has over 200 stores in 26 US states, primarily in the Northeast, Mid-Atlantic, Midwest, Southeastern, and West Coast regions.

== History ==
After the future company's co-founder, Bob Kaufman, was injured in a 1976 motorcycle accident, he discovered the benefits of a waterbed for recuperation. This led him to become involved in waterbed sales and, during the 1980s, he rented space in 24 New England stores to sell them. When waterbed sales dwindled by 1990, Kaufman partnered with Gene Rosenberg who owned Wholesale Furniture, one of the stores where Kaufman had rented space.

Together Kaufman and Rosenberg co-founded Bob's Discount Furniture with Rosenberg owning two-thirds of the company and Kaufman one-third. Rosenberg acquired a building in Newington, Connecticut, previously owned by a furniture company which had gone bankrupt, and re-opened it in 1991 as the first Bob's Discount Furniture store.

Through the 1990s, the company added additional locations, often acquiring buildings that had been vacated by tenants bankrupted during the early 1990s US recession. By 1997, it had a dozen stores in Connecticut and two in western Massachusetts. Its ability to grow during its early years in spite of unfavorable economic conditions has been partially attributed to the extensive use of commercials.

In early 2005, the investment firm Saunders Karp & Megrue acquired 70 percent ownership of Bob's Discount Furniture. Subsequently, Saunders Karp & Megrue was acquired by Apax Partners Worldwide in March 2005. In November 2006, Ted English, former president and CEO of TJX Companies, became the CEO of Bob's Discount Furniture, replacing Stan Adelstein, who became chairman. Adelstein retired in April 2013, and English took over as chairman. In late 2006, the company expanded into Rhode Island, New Jersey, and New York followed by an expansion further south into Maryland and Virginia.

In Q1 of 2014, Bob's Discount Furniture was acquired by Bain Capital, though its current management team continued to own a significant stake in the company. In 2016, Michael Skirvin was promoted from president and COO to president and CEO, replacing English who remained with the company as executive chairman. In June 2020, Skirvin retired and English became interim CEO. In October 2020 the position was permanently filled by William Barton, formerly of California Closets.

The company's founder, Robert "Bob" Kaufman leases store locations to the company. Mr. Kaufman resigned from the Board of Directors on December 1, 2025.

=== Initial public offering ===
On January 9, 2026, the company filed an S-1 registration statement with the U.S. Securities and Exchange Commission for an initial public offering (IPO) of common stock.

The company raised $330 million in proceeds through the sale of 19,450,000 shares at $17 each through underwriters led by J.P. Morgan Securities and Morgan Stanley. Law firms Ropes & Gray and Latham & Watkins represented Bob's and the underwriters, respectively. On February 5, 2026, the shares commenced trading on the New York Stock Exchange under the ticker symbol "BOBS".

Bain Capital, the majority shareholder (approximately 75% after the stock offering), charged the company advisory fees from 2014 through the consummation of the IPO. Bain will collect a $2 million IPO transaction fee.

== Advertising ==
Bob's Discount Furniture is a prolific advertiser on both television and radio. In 1997, the company was broadcasting roughly 500 commercials a week in Connecticut on network and cable television stations. By 2006, the commercials had become common during broadcasts of Boston Red Sox and New York Mets games. The commercials originally featured company president Bob Kaufman, typically wearing jeans and a golf shirt or turtleneck, and have also included employees such as Cathy Poulin, the company's Director of Public Relations. Since 2004, "Little Bob", a stop-motion-animated character based on Bob Kaufman, is featured in the company's commercials. The advertisements have been frequently described as wacky and goofy often containing catch phrases describing their "untouchable value".

Through corporate sponsorship programs, Bob's Discount Furniture has worked with several professional sports teams, including the New England Patriots, Pittsburgh Steelers, New York Giants, Los Angeles Chargers, and Los Angeles Galaxy. In 2025, Bob's Discount Furniture began its foray into NASCAR sponsorship, signing a multi-year deal with Joe Gibbs Racing to sponsor Denny Hamlin. Their first race was the 2025 Iowa Corn 350 at Iowa Speedway.

== Stores ==
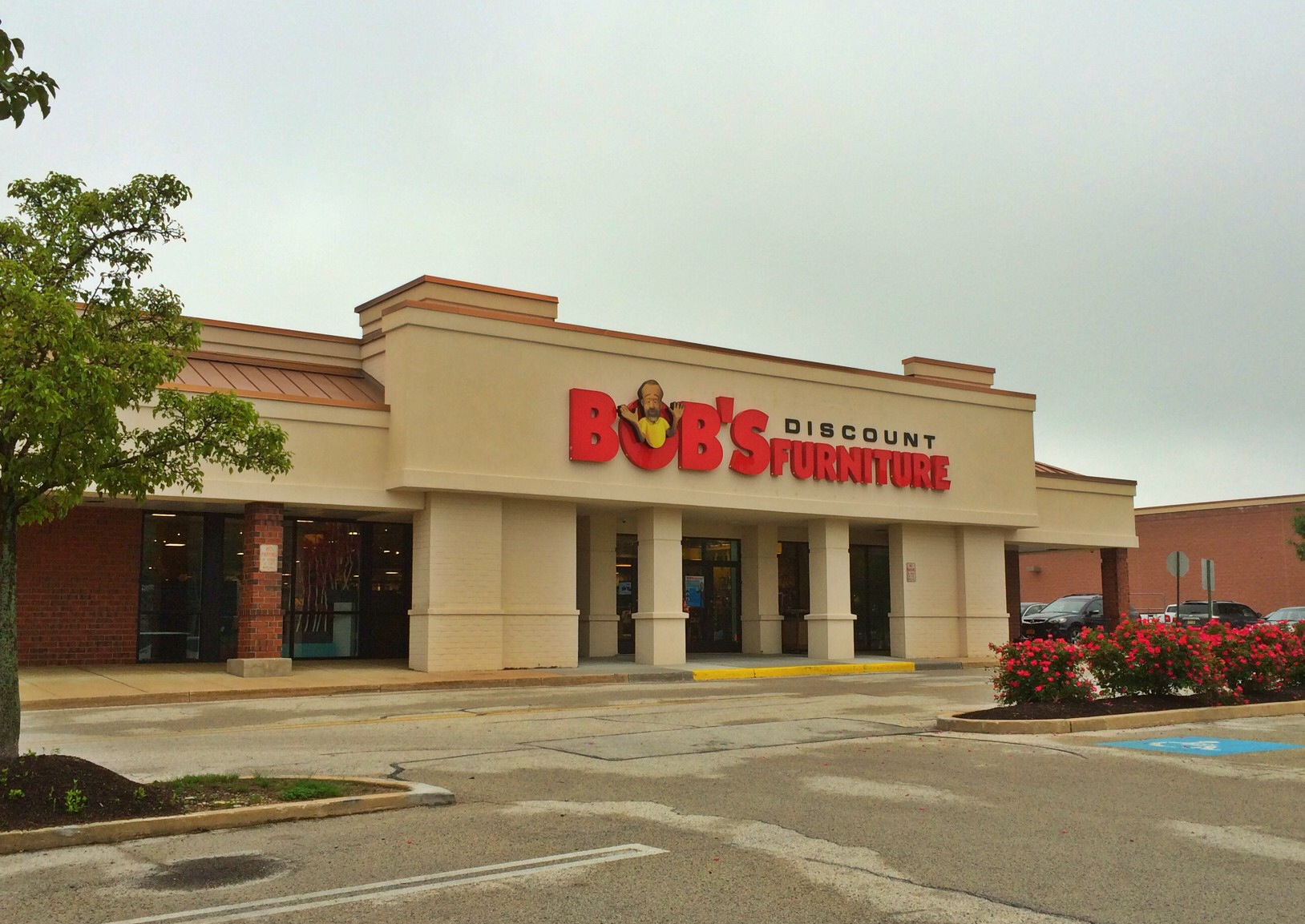
A location in King of Prussia, Pennsylvania

As of January 2026, Bob's Discount Furniture has 211 locations in 25 US states. The majority of these are in the Northeast, Mid-Atlantic, Midwest, and West Coast regions.

After its original markets in the Northeast and Mid-Atlantic, its Midwest expansion came in the wake of H.H. Gregg's sudden liquidation, allowing Bob's to purchase the leases for the bankrupt retailer's former locations. The company expanded to the West Coast in February 2018, picking up leases of former Sport Chalet and Sports Authority stores that closed in 2016. Around July 2020, Bob's expanded to the Phoenix metropolitan area in Arizona.

Bob's Discount Furniture locations include an in-store cafe with complimentary refreshments. Some stores also have a back room with products that are considered imperfect; this area is called "The Outlet".

== Community involvement ==
Bob's Discount Furniture donates over $2.75 million per year to charitable causes through two initiatives, the Bob’s Discount Furniture Charitable Foundation and Bob’s Outreach program. Through these efforts, the company has supported March of Dimes, Autism Speaks, Special Olympics, Save the Children, and Camp Rising Sun. It has also been recognized by the American Red Cross for its financial contributions and sponsored blood drives, some in partnership with professional American football teams including the New England Patriots and New York Giants.

Through the company’s Random Acts of Kindness program, funds are donated to local schools and programs for children following the opening of a new store. It also operated a charity fundraising event for over 30 years to raise funds for a number of non-profit charities, including Nutmeg Big Brothers Big Sisters, Family & Children’s Aid, Connecticut Children’s Medical Center, and Camp Rising Sun. The company collects and matches in-store donations from its customers through its Café Collections for a Cause program which supports non-profit charities including Autism Speaks, Alex's Lemonade Stand Foundation, and the Special Olympics.
