= Tim Scannell =

American college baseball coach

Current position
- Title: Head Coach
- Team: Trinity Tigers

Biographical details
- Born: Weymouth, Massachusetts, U.S.
- Education: Xaverian Brothers High School; Northeastern, B.A.

Playing career
- 1988–1992: Northeastern baseball

Coaching career (HC unless noted)
- 1993: UMass Amherst (assistant)
- 1994-1997: Northeastern (assistant)
- 1997-1998: Trinity Tigers (assistant)
- 1999–: Trinity Tigers

Head coaching record
- Overall: 709-268

Accomplishments and honors

Championships
- 2016 NCAA Division III Baseball Championship; 9x SCAC Championship

Awards
- 2016 D3baseball.com Coach of the Year; 2015 NCAA DIII West Region Coach of the Year; 9x SCAC Coach of the Year

Tim Scannell is an American college baseball coach, currently serving as head coach of the Trinity University (Texas) baseball team since 1999. In 2016, Scannell was named the NCAA DIII National Coach of the Year after leading his Trinity Tigers to the NCAA Division III Baseball Championship.

== Playing career ==
Scannell grew up in Weymouth, Massachusetts and attended Xaverian Brothers High School, lettering in baseball for the Hawks. Scannell then was a four-year starter for the Northeastern University and earned All-NAC honors in 1990 and 1991. He served as team captain for two seasons and posted a .370 career batting average. Scannell also spent two summers playing in the Cape Cod Baseball League (CCBL) with the Harwich Mariners in 1989 and the Cotuit Kettleers in 1990.

== Coaching career ==
Scannell began his coaching career as assistant baseball coach at the University of Massachusetts Amherst in 1993. He then returned to his alma mater Northeastern University where the Huskies captured the NAC title and advanced to 1994 NCAA Division I baseball tournament.

In 1999, Scannell became the head baseball coach at Trinity after two years as assistant coach. Since taking over in 1999, Scannell has become the winningest Trinity baseball coach in history having amassed a record of 709–268 as of 2020. His winning percentage of .726 places him in the top-10 among active Division III coaches. He has also guided the Tigers to nine Southern Collegiate Athletic Conference Championships. In the summer of 1999, he returned to the CCBL to serve as hitting coach of his former Cotuit team. In 2016, Scannell and his Trinity Tigers won the NCAA Division III Baseball Championship.

Scannell has been elected as the SCAC Coach of the Year nine times and was elected the 2015 NCAA Division III West Region Coach of the Year by the American Baseball Coaches Association. In 2016, after leading Trinity to the Division III NCAA Championship, he was named National Coach of the Year by D3Baseball.com

== Personal ==
Tim Scannell is married and has three sons, Matthew, TJ, and James. His son Matthew plays baseball at Wake Forest.
