= Kevin Reddington =

American defense attorney (born 1951)

Kevin Reddington (born February 9, 1951) is an American criminal defense attorney based in Brockton, Massachusetts, who has appeared in a number of high-profile cases. He received his Juris Doctor degree from Suffolk University Law School in 1975. He has been a member of the American College of Trial Lawyers since 1996.

== Early life and education ==
Kevin Reddington was born on February 9, 1951, in Cambridge, Massachusetts. He received his undergraduate degree from Boston College in 1972 and went on to attend Suffolk University Law School, graduating in 1975.

== Notable clients ==
=== Therese Rodgers ===
In 1989, Reddington represented Therese Rodgers, who was acquitted of killing her abusive partner. In this case, he became one of the first lawyers in Massachusetts to win an acquittal by arguing that battered woman syndrome could cause temporary insanity.

=== Catherine Greig ===
He later represented Catherine Greig, the longtime girlfriend of American gangster Whitey Bulger, when she was charged with harboring a fugitive.

=== Michael McDermott ===
He represented Michael Morgan McDermott, who was convicted of murdering seven coworkers in a mass shooting at Edgewater Technology.

=== Lindsay Clancy ===
Reddington led the defense in the Lindsay Clancy trial, which resulted in a mistrial due to an 11:1 hung jury on September 4, 2026.
