= Drew Strojny =

American football player (born 1981)

No. 64
- Position: Offensive tackle

Personal information
- Born: June 30, 1981 (age 45); Norwood, Massachusetts, U.S.
- Listed height: 6 ft 7 in (2.01 m)
- Listed weight: 311 lb (141 kg)

Career information
- High school: Xaverian Brothers (Westwood, Massachusetts)
- College: Duke
- NFL draft: 2004: 7th round, 203rd overall pick

Career history
- New York Giants (2004)*; Philadelphia Eagles (2004-2005)*; Tampa Bay Buccaneers (2005)*; New York Jets (2005)*; St. Louis Rams (2005–2007)*
- * Offseason or practice squad member only

Drew Strojny (born June 30, 1981) is an American former professional football player.

== Football career ==
Strojny was selected in the seventh round with the 203rd pick of the 2004 NFL draft by the New York Giants. He played for the Philadelphia Eagles in 2004 and the St. Louis Rams between 2005 and 2007.

Strojny played in 46 career games for the Duke Blue Devils football team with 43 starting assignments between 2000 and 2004. He was a two-year team captain and twice Duke's Outstanding Offensive Lineman. In addition, Strojny was twice named to the Academic All-ACC Football Team.

Strojny was a two-year two-time letter winner for the Xaverian Hawks football team in 1998 and 1999. He was a member of the 1998 Massachusetts Division 1 Super Bowl team. As a senior, he was an All-State selection after recording 87 tackles, 8.5 sacks and 12 tackles for loss.

== Business career ==
Strojny is the founder and principal of Jestro, a company building products for the web. In 2008, Strojny founded The Theme Foundry, which sells professional templates for WordPress, and in 2013, he founded Memberful, which creates subscription-based membership websites.

== Education ==
Strojny graduated from Xaverian Brothers High School in Westwood, Massachusetts and was National Football Foundation and Hall of Fame Scholar-Athlete in 1999. He then graduated with a bachelor's degree in philosophy from Duke University in 2004.

== Personal ==
Strojny is a native of Wrentham, Massachusetts and currently resides in Boise, Idaho with his wife, Jennifer.
