= William Sullivan (cricketer) =

Australian cricketer

Personal information
- Born: 19 August 1877; Hotham, Victoria, Australia
- Died: 29 August 1924 (aged 47); Albury, New South Wales, Australia
- Source: Cricinfo, 6 October 2020

William Sullivan (19 August 1877 – 29 August 1924) was an Australian cricketer. He played in one first-class match for Queensland in 1908/09.

== See also ==
- List of Queensland first-class cricketers
