= GoFundMe Pro =

Software company and online fundraising platform

GoFundMe Pro (formerly Classy)

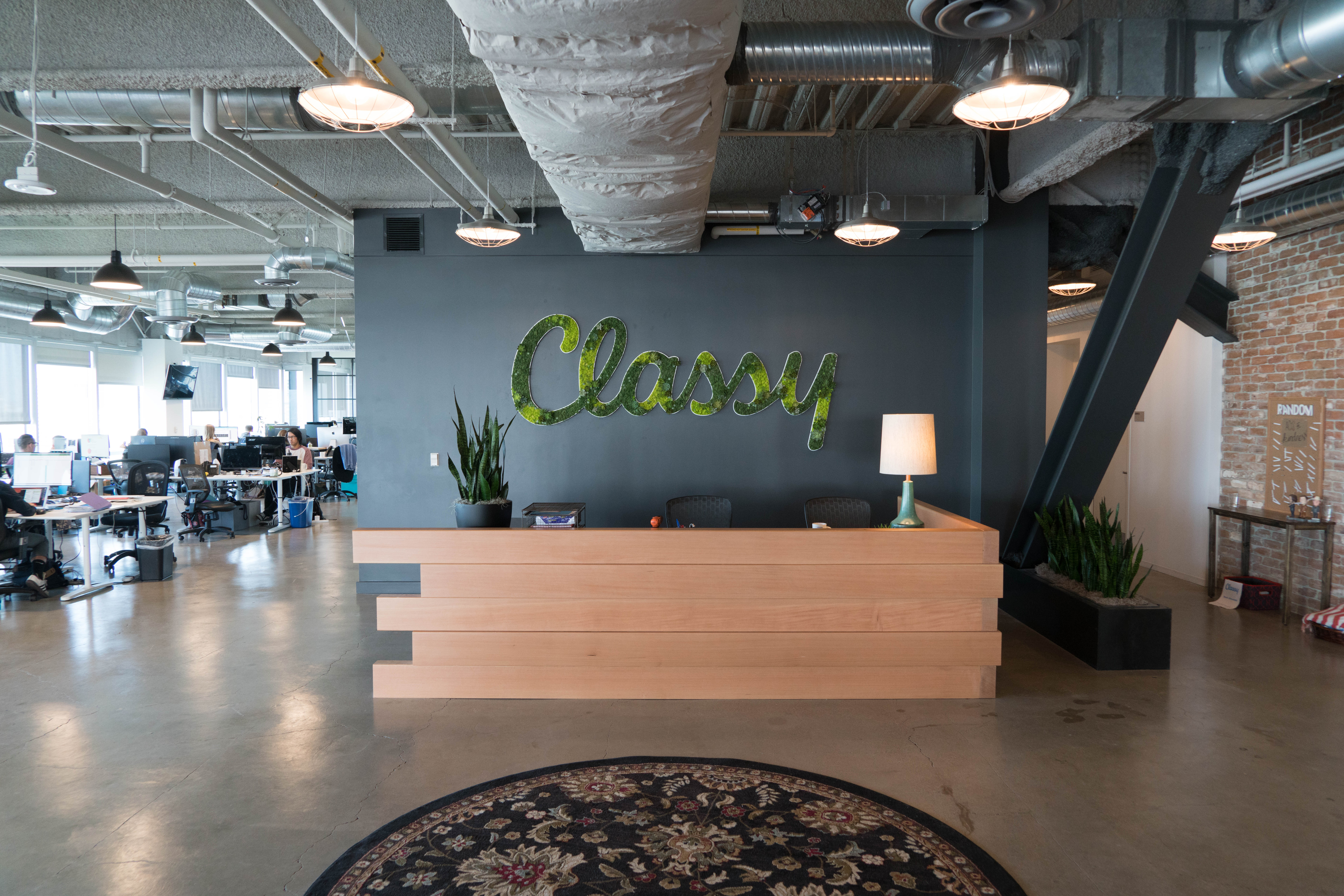
- The Classy office in San Diego, California
- Formerly: StayClassy; Classy
- Type: Subsidiary
- Industry: Crowdfunding
- Founded: 2006
- Founders: Scot Chisholm, Pat Walsh, Marshall Peden and Joe Callahan
- Headquarters: San Diego, California, United States
- Number of employees: 200 (2018)
- Parent: GoFundMe
- Website: classy.org (Note: The Classy brand was retired in 2025; the service now operates as GoFundMe Pro.)

GoFundMe Pro (formerly Classy) is a software company and online fundraising platform designed for nonprofit organizations. It was acquired by GoFundMe in 2022 and its products were merged into the parent company's nonprofit offering under the GoFundMe Pro name in 2025, when the Classy brand was retired.

Headquartered in San Diego, California, Classy was founded by CEO Scot Chisholm, Pat Walsh, and Marshall Peden in 2006, originally to host fundraising events that benefit charities. The firm transitioned to a software and services company in 2010. Its software as a service products launched in 2011 and focus on peer-to-peer fundraising, crowdfunding, events, supporter management and marketing automation. In September 2016, Classy closed $30 million in Series C funding from JMI Equity, Peter Thiel's Mithril Capital, Salesforce Ventures, and Bullpen Capital. In April 2021, it raised $118 million in series D funding, making Classy a Public Benefit Corporation.

== History ==
Founder Scot Chisholm graduated from college with a degree in mechanical and industrial engineering and moved to San Diego the next day, eventually going to work for Booz Allen Hamilton. Because his mother had had cancer when he was a child, and a number of his friends had similar family experiences, they organized a charity pub crawl to raise money for the American Cancer Society. The event raised $1,000.

Chisholm has said that at one of the planning sessions for the pub crawl, the movie Anchorman was on in the background, and that the sign-off of Will Ferrell's character, Ron Burgundy, "You stay classy, San Diego", inspired the name for the pub crawl and continued as the company name.

Chisholm continued organizing events for a variety of organizations. He became frustrated with offline methods so in 2006 he cobbled together a system that was "a combination of Evite, PayPal, and Myspace." This system could not meet performance requirements as the pace and size of events grew to include a 5,000 attendee music festival. Eventually Chisholm hired a local software developer through a Craigslist advertisement to build a customized application. In 2011 Chisholm relaunched Classy as a technology company, with original co-founders Pat Walsh and Marshall Peden, and newly added software developer Peter Nystrom and designer Joe Callahan.

To continue its development, Classy worked with CONNECT incubator. In June 2015 Classy secured its Series B round of venture capital funding from Mithril Capital Management and Salesforce Ventures. At that time the company had 80 employees. The main purpose for the funding was to triple the size of its 15-person engineering team and expand its international functionality. The round was reported at $18 million and was led by Mithril.

In September 2016, Classy closed $30 million in Series C funding from JMI Equity, Mithril Capital, Salesforce Ventures, and Bullpen Capital.

Its clients have included Shriners Hospitals for Children, City of Hope National Medical Center, the Leukemia & Lymphoma Society, Teach for America, Girls Who Code, Ushahidi, Oxfam, World Food Programme and National Geographic.

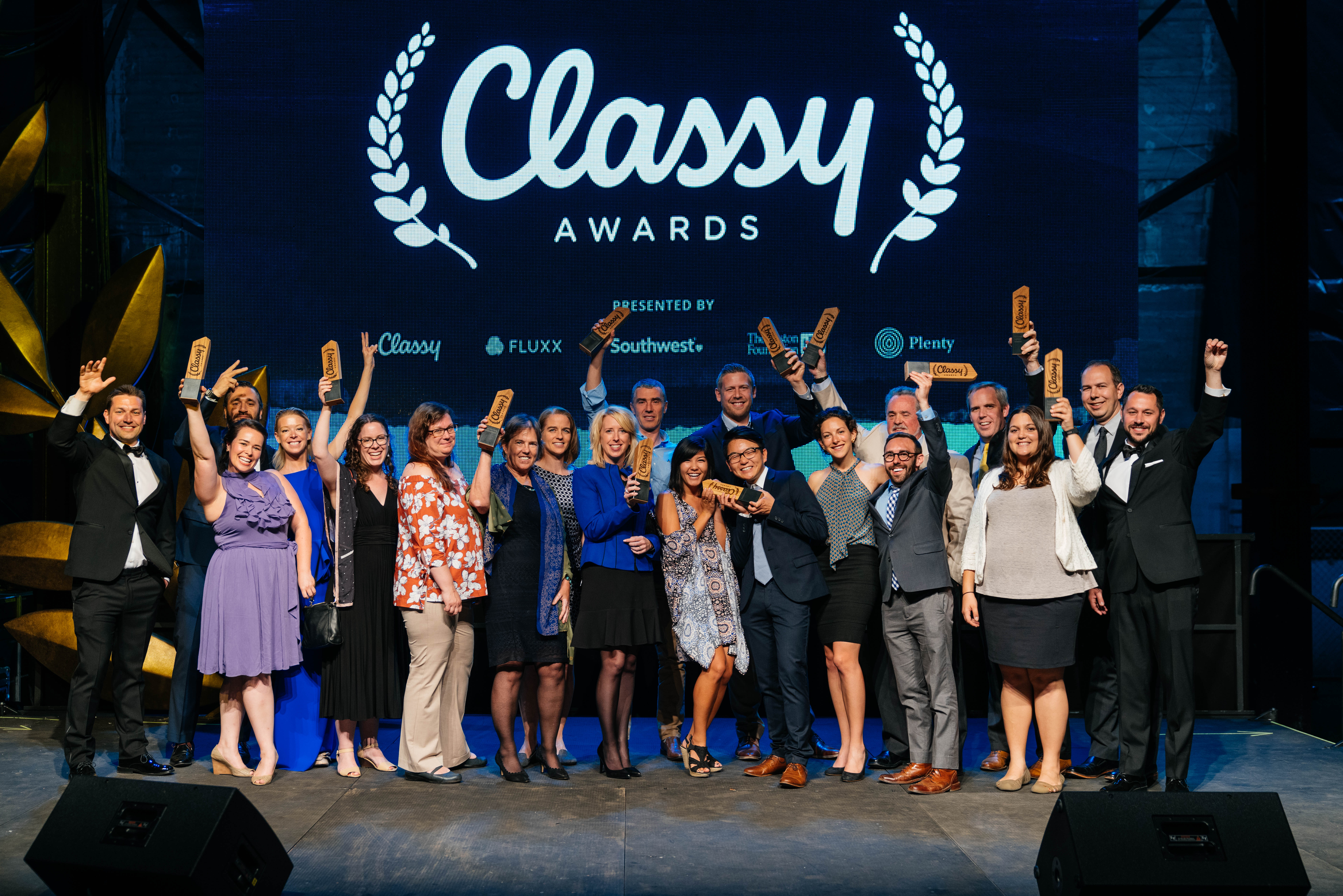
The Classy Awards 2017 winners at The Collaborative, Cruiseport, Boston, Massachusetts, 15 June 2017

In 2010, the company established the Classy Awards to recognize innovative nonprofits addressing significant challenges. It will hold its eighth annual Classy Awards in June 2018.

=== Acquisition by GoFundMe ===
GoFundMe, founded in 2010, acquired Classy in 2022 in an all-equity transaction whose terms were not disclosed. Classy had by then raised almost $184 million from investors. Both companies were based in San Diego.

In 2025 the two were combined under the name GoFundMe Pro and the Classy brand was retired, leaving GoFundMe as the consumer-facing service and GoFundMe Pro as the offering for nonprofit organizations. Margaret L. Richardson, GoFundMe's chief marketing and corporate affairs officer, said that the company's earlier GoFundMe Charity product had been shut down because a more robust system was wanted, and that this had contributed to the decision to buy Classy; the integration announced in 2025 was, she said, the realization of that plan. Tim Cadogan, GoFundMe's chief executive, framed the rebrand as a long-term commitment to the nonprofit sector.

== Bibliography ==
- Bigelow, Bruce V. (1 July 2015). "Classy Raises $18M in Round Led by Peter Thiel's Mithril Capital". Xconomy. Cambridge, Massachusetts: Xconomy, Inc.
- Chisholm, Scot (n.d.). "Our Story". Classy.org.
- Chisholm, Scot (11 March 2016). "How Classy Is Helping Nonprofits To Attract and Retain Supporters". SocialTech (Interview). Interviewed by Benjamin F. Kuo. Westlake Village, Calif.: SocialTech, LLC.
- Gauss, Allison (16 June 2017). "Announcing the 2017 Classy Awards Winners". Classy.org blog.
- Harel, Terri (n.d.). "The Malala Fund – Two Women, Under 30 and Changing the World". Classy.org.
- Hughes-Gorup, Star (15 August 2017). "Spaces We Love: Classy's Cutting-Edge Office". Millennial View. San Jose, Calif.: Hughes Marino.
- Kolodny, Lora (30 June 2015). "Classy Raises $18M to Help Social Enterprises Do More Than Crowdfunding". The Wall Street Journal. New York: Dow Jones & Company, Inc.
- Kolodny, Lora (1 November 2016). "Classy Raises $30 Million to Help Nonprofits Raise Donations, Make a Greater Impact". TechCrunch. San Francisco, Calif.: Oath Inc.
- Magee, Christine (30 June 2015). "Making Nonprofits SaaS-Savvy, Classy Raises $18 Million". TechCrunch. San Francisco, Calif.: Oath Inc.
- Parr, Shawn (20 September 2012). "StayClassy's 3 Pillars For Powerful Nonprofit Fundraising". Fast Company. New York: Fast Company, Inc.
- Thorpe, Devin (24 August 2017). "10 Problems. 10 Solutions. 10 Awards. Classy". Forbes. Jersey City, N.J.
