= Trinity Tigers =

Athletics program of Trinity University in San Antonio, Texas

- University: Trinity University
- Nickname: Tigers
- NCAA: Division III
- Conferences: Southern Athletic Association (SAA)
- Athletic director: Bob King
- Location: San Antonio, Texas
- Varsity teams: 18
- Football stadium: Trinity Football Stadium
- Basketball arena: Ron and Genie Calgaard Gymnasium
- Baseball stadium: Trinity Baseball Field
- Colors: Maroon and white
- Mascot: LeeRoy
- Fight song: "Go You Tigers"
- Website: trinitytigers.com
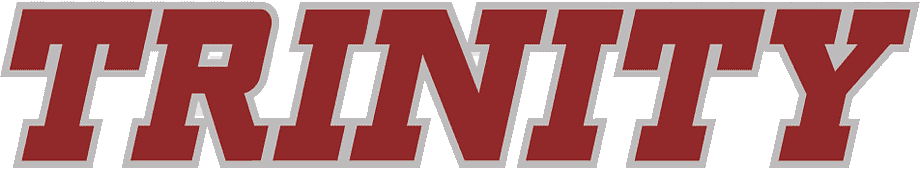

The Trinity Tigers is the nickname for the sports teams of Trinity University in San Antonio, Texas. They participate in the NCAA's Division III and the Southern Athletic Association (SAA). The school mascot is LeeRoy, a Bengal tiger. In the 1950s, LeeRoy was an actual tiger who was brought to sporting events, but today LeeRoy is portrayed by a student wearing a tiger suit. Early in its history, the school participated in Division I and Division II athletics, but by 1991 the entire program made the move to Division III, at which time it joined the SCAC. Trinity athletics was a former member of the Southern Collegiate Athletic Conference until joining the Southern Athletic Association in 2025.

Trinity fields strong teams, evidenced by its finishes in the National Association of Collegiate Directors of Athletics (NACDA) Learfield Directors' Cup, which recognizes the strength of athletic programs by division. Since the Directors' Cup inception in 1995, Trinity has finished in the top 10 on five occasions out of over 400 Division III programs; it finished 20th in 2021–22.

In recent years, Trinity has reached the national Division III playoffs in several sports, including football (national runners-up, 2002), women's basketball (2003 national champions), volleyball (second place in 2022 and 1999; third place in 2019), baseball (national champion in 2016), women's cross country, men's and women's track and field, and men's and women's soccer (men's team won the national title in 2003 and placed second in 2007; women placed second in 2013). In 2011–12, the Trinity sports program reclaimed Southern Collegiate Athletic Conference "President's Trophy," awarded to the school in the conference that has the best overall sports record for the year. as of 2022, Trinity has won the President's Trophy every year since. Prior to that, the Tigers had won the award eleven out of the preceding twelve seasons.

In addition to team success, individual Trinity student-athletes have won a number of championships over the years which are detailed below.

Club sports include men's and women's Lacrosse, Water Polo, and Trap and Skeet.

== Varsity teams ==
Men's sports	Women's sports
Baseball	Basketball
Basketball	Cross country
Cross country	Golf
Football	Soccer
Golf	Softball
Soccer	Swimming
Swimming	Tennis
Tennis	Track and field
Track and field	Volleyball

=== Baseball ===
The Trinity University baseball program has a motto - "the tradition continues". The Trinity Baseball Stadium was refurbished in 2022 with a turf field, new netting, updated batting cages and new dugouts.

In May 2015, Trinity baseball qualified for the Division III College World Series for the first time, falling one game short of the championship round and placing third overall.

In 2016, Trinity won the NCAA Division III College World Series and became national champions. In a best-of-three format, Trinity defeated Keystone College 14-6 in game 1 and 10-7 in game 2. Trinity defeated the 2015 champion, SUNY Cortland, twice in the bracket rounds of the tournament en route to the national championship.

Jeremy Wolf was playing in the outfield when the Trinity baseball team won the 2016 NCAA Division III Baseball Championship. In 2016, Wolf hit .408/.508/.741 with 60 runs, 28 doubles (leading the NCAA, and establishing new Trinity and SCAC single-season records), 149 total bases (third in the nation), 11 home runs, and 70 RBIs (4th in the nation). He was named All-American First Team of both the American Baseball Coaches Association (ABCA) and D3baseball.com, was named the West Region Player of the Year by the ABCA and D3baseball.com, and was named Southern Collegiate Athletic Conference Player of the Year. In his college career Wolf hit 72 doubles, a Trinity record, over 189 games.

The 2021 Trinity baseball team was ranked #1 in the country during the regular season and was selected for the NCAA Regional Tournament in St. Paul, Minnesota. Trinity won SCAC conference championships in 1995, 1999, 2004, 2006, 2008, 2010, 2011, 2013, 2014, 2015, 2016, and 2019. In addition to 2015 and 2016, the Trinity Tigers made it to the NCAA College World Series in 2022.

A number of former Trinity baseball players have made names for themselves in the ranks of professional baseball teams around the country.

Tim Scannell is in his 26th season as the head baseball coach. After serving as an assistant coach for two seasons, Coach Scannell took the Tigers' reins prior to the 1999 campaign. Since that time, the Tigers have amassed an impressive 775 victories (.728) over 25 seasons with Coach Scannell at the helm. Coach Scannell is ranked in the top 10 among active NCAA Division III coaches by winning percentage. The other Trinity baseball coaches are both former Trinity baseball players — David Smith is the pitching coach.

=== Basketball ===
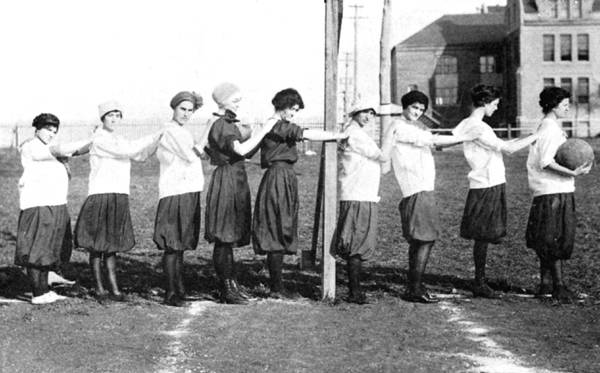
Women's basketball team, 1915

The Tigers had a successful men's basketball program under Bob Polk from 1965 to 1968; Polk, an Indiana native, had compiled a record of 197–106 at Vanderbilt, but poor health led to his resignation on the advice of his doctors. However, he was out of basketball for only 18 months as his health rapidly improved. As both the head basketball coach and athletics director, Polk became Southland Conference Coach-of-the-Year in 1967. He was also the NCAA National Coach of the Year for the NCAA College Division (the predecessor of today's NCAA Division II and NCAA Division III) in 1968. In his three years at Trinity, Polk compiled a 69–28 record and led the Tigers to the 1968 NCAA Men's Division II Basketball Tournament, where they finished third overall.

Trinity's women's teams, however, have had considerably more success. The 2002–03 edition went 28–5 and won the national championship under the leadership of coach Becky Geyer, despite never previously having won an NCAA playoff game in school history. While under the leadership of coach Cameron Hill, the team has become a perennial playoff participant, making it to the Elite 8 in 2022 and the Sweet 16 in 2023. In 12 seasons, Hill's teams have earned a record of 249–49 (0.835).

=== Tennis ===
Trinity has historically had a strong tennis program, once a Division I tennis power, under tennis coach Clarency Mabry, winning the men's NCAA championship in 1972, as well as being runners up in 1970, 1971, 1977 and 1979. The women's team captured the first USLTA women's collegiate championship in 1968 and won several more titles. In the early 1960s the program was home to arguably some of the best tennis players in the world, and bypassed the NCAA tournament to enter Wimbledon. In 1963, Chuck McKinley of Trinity won the Wimbledon Men's Singles Championship. He was also the runner up in 1961. In 1970, as a freshman at Trinity, Brian Gottfried won the USTA boys 18s singles championship, as well as the doubles championship with Alexander Mayer.

Other famous tennis players to attend Trinity included Butch Newman, Bob McKinley, Frank Froehling, Dick Stockton, Bill Scanlon and Gretchen Magers. The school's men's and women's programs both claimed national championships in 2000.

==== Tennis Team championships (Division I era) ====
- 1968 USTA National Women's Collegiate Championship
- 1969 USTA National Women's Collegiate Championship
- 1972 NCAA Division I Men's Tennis Championship
- 1973 USTA National Women's Collegiate Championship
- 1975 USTA National Women's Collegiate Championship
- 1975 National Collegiate Team Champions – Trap and Skeet
- 1976 USTA National Women's Collegiate Championship
- 1976 National Collegiate Team Champions – Trap and Skeet
- 1977 National Collegiate Team Champions – Trap and Skeet
- 1980 National Collegiate Team Champions – Trap and Skeet

==== NCAA Team championships (Division III era) ====
- 2000 NCAA Division III Men's Tennis Championship
- 2000 NCAA Division III Women's Tennis Championship
- 2003 NCAA Division III Women's Basketball Championship
- 2003 NCAA Division III Men's Soccer Championship
- 2015 ITA Men's Tennis Indoor National Championship
- 2016 NCAA Division III Men's Baseball Championship

==== Tennis Individual championships (Division I/II era) ====
- 1966 NCAA Division II Men's Outdoor 100yd Dash (Clyde Glosson)
- 1968 USTA National Women's Singles Championship (Emilie Burrer)
- 1968 USTA National Women's Doubles Championship (Emilie Burrer & Becky Vest)
- 1968 NCAA Division II Men's Outdoor 200yd Dash (Clyde Glosson)
- 1969 USTA National Women's Singles Championship (Emilie Burrer)
- 1969 USTA National Women's Doubles Championship (Emilie Burrer & Becky Vest)
- 1972 NCAA Division I Men's Singles Championship (Dick Stockton)
- 1975 USTA National Women's Singles Championship (Stephanie Tolleson)
- 1975 USTA National Women's Doubles Championship (JoAnne Russell & Donna Stockton)
- 1976 NCAA Division I Men's Singles Championship (Bill Scanlon)
- 1979 NCAA Division I Men's Doubles Championship (Erick Iskersky & Ben McCown)
- 1983 NCAA Division I Women's Doubles Championship (Louise Allen & Gretchen Rush)

==== NCAA/ITA Individual championships (Division III era) ====
- 1997 ITA Men's National Singles Championship (Jamie Broach)
- 1997 ITA Men's National Doubles Championship (Jamie Broach & Michael Slutzky)
- 1998 ITA Women's National Singles Championship (Lola Taylor)
- 1998 ITA Women's National Doubles Championship (Lola Taylor & Lizzie Yasser)
- 1999 ITA Women's National Singles Championship (Lizzie Yasser)
- 1999 ITA Women's National Doubles Championship (Lizzie Yasser & Amanda Browne)
- 2003 ITA Men's National Doubles Championship (Sean Fifield & Stefan Parker)
- 2003 ITA Women's National Doubles Championship (Heather McGowan & Hayley Dittus)
- 2004 NCAA Division III Women's Outdoor High Jump (Christyn Schumann)
- 2004 NCAA Division III Women's Indoor High Jump (Christyn Schumann)
- 2005 NCAA Division III Women's Outdoor High Jump (Christyn Schumann)
- 2006 NCAA Division III Women's Outdoor High Jump (Christyn Schumann)
- 2009 NCAA Division III Men's Indoor Pentathlon (Todd Wildman)
- 2010 NCAA Division III Women's 1-Meter Diving (Lindsay Martin)
- 2010 NCAA Division III Women's 3-Meter Diving (Hayley Emerick)
- 2010 NCAA Division III Men's Indoor Pentathlon (Todd Wildman)
- 2010 ITA Men's National Doubles Championship (Bobby Cocanougher & Cory Kowal)
- 2012 NCAA Division III Women's 3-Meter Diving (Ruth Hahn)
- 2012 ITA Men's National Singles Championship (Aaron Skinner)
- 2014 NCAA Division III Men's 100 Yard Freestyle (Stephen Culberson)
- 2014 ITA Men's National Doubles Championship (Jordan Mayer & Aaron Skinner)
