= Camp Rising Sun (Connecticut) =

Camp for children with cancer in Connecticut

Coordinates: 42.020°N 73.108°W

Camp Rising Sun in Colebrook, Connecticut, is a non-profit overnight camp for children with cancer that is held for one week during the summer and one weekend in the winter.

The camp, which is staffed by volunteer counselors, does not charge campers to attend. It is staffed by a volunteer medical staff, including Dr. Joe McNamara, a pediatric oncologist and an associate clinical professor of pediatrics at the Yale University School of Medicine.

== History ==
Camp Rising Sun was founded in 1983 in Hebron, Connecticut. As participation grew, it moved to a larger site at Camp Jewell YMCA in Colebrook, Connecticut. There are now more than 100 campers that attend the camp each summer.

== Funding ==
Camp Rising Sun is funded through public and private donations. Volunteers hold an annual summer benefit at the Owenego Inn in Branford, Connecticut, to aid in fund raising.
