= Killing of the Clancy children =

2023 triple filicide in Massachusetts, United States

- Cora (left), Callan (middle), and Dawson Clancy (right)
- Location: Duxbury, Massachusetts, U.S.
- Date: January 24, 2023; 3 years ago
- Attack type: Filicide by strangulation, attempted murder-suicide
- Weapon: Exercise bands
- Deaths: 3
- Injuries: 1 (self-inflicted)
- Accused: Lindsay Clancy
- Charges: First-degree murder (3 counts)
- Verdict: Mistrial due to a hung jury

On January 24, 2023, Lindsay Clancy fatally strangled her three children—five-year-old Cora, three-year-old Dawson, and eight-month-old Callan—at the family's home in Duxbury, Massachusetts, United States. She then cut her wrists and neck and jumped from a second-story window, sustaining injuries that left her paralyzed from the waist down. Lindsay later said she heard an auditory hallucination commanding her to commit the acts and felt unable to resist.

Lindsay was prosecuted for three counts of murder in a criminal trial that began on July 20, 2026. She pleaded not guilty; her defense argued that she had been suffering from postpartum psychosis and bipolar disorder and therefore lacked criminal responsibility for her actions. Much of the trial focused on her mental health in the months prior, during which she repeatedly sought treatment for symptoms including insomnia, intrusive thoughts, and suicidal ideation. Prosecutors argued that Lindsay was mentally aware at the time of the killings and that her actions beforehand, including sending her husband out on an errand, demonstrated methodical planning. They emphasized that she reported hearing the commanding voice only on the day of the killings and that none of her clinicians reported observing psychosis.

After nearly seven weeks of trial, the jury reported that it was deadlocked. The jury foreperson informed judge William F. Sullivan that a single holdout juror might be disregarding his instructions on reasonable doubt. After defense attorney Kevin Reddington tried and failed to have the juror removed, Sullivan formally declared a mistrial on September 4, 2026. In November, Sullivan set a retrial date for March 29, 2027.

The case attracted significant media attention and wide discussion of postpartum mental illness and criminal responsibility. Both Lindsay and her former husband, Patrick Clancy, filed civil lawsuits against her former healthcare providers, alleging that medical malpractice and negligence had contributed to the deaths of their children.

== Background ==
Clancy appearing at a court hearing in September 2026

Lindsay Marie Musgrove was born on August 11, 1990. She grew up in Wallingford, Connecticut, and studied at Quinnipiac University. She met her future husband, Patrick Clancy, in 2013 through her college roommate. The couple married on December 3, 2016, and later settled in Duxbury, where Lindsay worked as a labor and delivery nurse at Massachusetts General Hospital.

The Clancys' first child, Cora, was born on December 4, 2017, after which Lindsay began working part-time. Their second child, Dawson, was born on September 30, 2019. Lindsay reported experiencing postpartum anxiety after the births of her first two children. Following the birth of her second child, she briefly participated in talk therapy and was prescribed the antidepressant Zoloft, though accounts vary on whether she took it.

The family's youngest child, Callan, was born on May 26, 2022. Following Callan's birth, Lindsay took 18 weeks of maternity leave, while Patrick took 12 weeks of paternity leave before returning to his work-from-home job in the technology sector. In anticipation of Lindsay returning to work in November, the family hired a nanny who worked three days a week from September to early December 2022.

=== Events preceding the killings ===
Lindsay said her anxiety returned and worsened after the birth of her third child in May 2022, particularly toward the end of her maternity leave. Patrick testified that she planned to ask for Zoloft to help manage her anxiety and transition back to work.

In September 2022, Lindsay began seeing psychiatrist Jennifer Tufts, virtually via telehealth. Tufts diagnosed her with generalized anxiety disorder, prescribed Zoloft, and completed paperwork to extend Lindsay's maternity leave. Lindsay delayed starting the medication until mid-October, and soon reported adverse effects. Tufts prescribed Ativan for her on October 21. On October 26, Lindsay reported that Ativan reduced her anxiety but not her insomnia and said she was using Benadryl as a sleep aid. Tufts prescribed Buspar, but Lindsay was afraid to try a new medication and did not take it. Tufts warned her that Ativan could be addictive and reduced her dosage on November 2.

According to Patrick, Lindsay's condition worsened in November 2022. He testified that she lost her appetite, withdrew socially, and experienced episodes of intense fear. On November 8, Lindsay posted in a Facebook support group for postpartum depression and anxiety. She said that although Ativan had helped her feel normal again, she was concerned about becoming addicted and asked for alternatives. On November 15, she sought treatment at an emergency room after reportedly going two days without sleep. A physician prescribed trazodone, but Lindsay found it ineffective. By mid-November, Lindsay's parents had begun visiting for days at a time to help with childcare.

On November 20, Lindsay's mother-in-law, a nurse, contacted Julie Paul, a psychiatric nurse practitioner at her hospital's perinatal clinic. Paul called Lindsay later that day. Paul prescribed Prozac but, a few days later, Lindsay said she could not tolerate it. On November 25, Paul asked her to discontinue both Prozac and Ativan, offered a one-time dose of Ambien to help her sleep, and prescribed Remeron and Klonopin. When Paul left the hospital in December 2022, Lindsay's case was transferred to nurse practitioner Rebecca Jollotta. Jollotta prescribed Seroquel, an anti-psychotic and off-label sleep aid, on November 30.

=== December 2022 ===
During the first week of December, Lindsay told both Tufts and Jollotta that she believed Remeron was causing intrusive thoughts. In messages to Jollotta, she described "horribly intrusive thoughts wanting it to be all over" and feeling "no emotion whatsoever". Jollotta believed Lindsay's symptoms were more consistent with postpartum depression than medication side effects. Tufts testified that Lindsay was "feeling very hopeless" and was approaching suicidal ideation. In her lawsuit, Lindsay claims she also reported hallucinations to two suicide hotlines at around the same time. Neither hotline intervened because she did not have a plan to harm herself. She also began seeing therapist Latiesha Dukes, who said she referred her to Women & Infants Hospital of Rhode Island after Lindsay reported intrusive suicidal thoughts.

At a December 6 meeting with both Lindsay and Patrick, Jollotta suggested Lindsay had bipolar disorder. Jollotta testified that Patrick responded: "My wife is not bipolar." Jollotta increased the Seroquel dosage and recommended hospitalization. On December 15, Lindsay visited an emergency room due to suicidal thoughts but declined inpatient treatment. Tufts prescribed Lamictal, a mood stabilizer, the following day.

On December 20, Lindsay joined a day program for postpartum depression at Women & Infants. The hospital discharged her after one day. According to Lindsay's legal filings, the clinical team believed her symptoms were "more pharmacologically induced than purely depressive". The hospital advised her to discontinue Seroquel. Although the recommendation concerned Jollotta, she agreed to help Lindsay taper off the medication.

Both Patrick and Lindsay's mother testified that Lindsay disclosed thoughts of harming the children to them at some point in December. Patrick testified that he asked whether she needed to be separated from them, but that she said no. He said he found the disclosure confusing, as she continued to care for the children normally and he never saw her mistreat them.

=== January 2023 ===
On December 31, 2022, Lindsay returned to the emergency room because of persistent suicidal ideation. The next morning, she voluntarily began inpatient treatment at McLean Hospital. Psychiatrist Alia Goodheart testified that Lindsay was diagnosed with "major depressive disorder, severe, without psychotic features". Her treatment goals included tapering off of Seroquel and attempting to sleep without relying on it. After several nights of sleep, Lindsay asked to be discharged a day early to attend a birthday party for Cora. Goodheart described her as future-oriented, invested in her children, and having substantial family support. Lindsay left McLean on January 5, 2023, with prescriptions for Ativan and trazodone.

At a virtual appointment the following day, Tufts described Lindsay as "deteriorating" and discussed further medication changes. Tufts saw her again on January 9, and prescribed amitriptyline on January 16. During the month before the killings, Lindsay's phone was used to search for information about her medications, bipolar disorder, hallucinations, and insomnia. Other searches included "Where is the carotid artery", "How to slit your throat to die", "Can you turn airbags off on Kia Sorento", and "Can you treat a sociopath?"

At an appointment on January 23, the day before the killings, Tufts testified that Lindsay appeared depressed and said she had to force herself to get out of bed. Lindsay denied having suicidal or homicidal thoughts, and Tufts observed no signs of psychosis.

== Killings ==
=== January 24, 2023 ===
According to Patrick, on the morning of January 24, 2023, Lindsay told him that she had slept "pretty well" and was feeling good. She had become preoccupied with their daughter Cora's stomachache and took her to a pediatrician appointment. In the afternoon, Lindsay built a snowman and did art projects with the children. Throughout the day, she exchanged routine texts with Patrick, who was working from home.

At 4:02 p.m., Lindsay used her phone to search "kids Miralax". Eleven minutes later, she searched for a restaurant in Plymouth, Massachusetts, and used Apple Maps to check how long it would take to drive to there. At 4:47 p.m., she called a drugstore and spoke with a manager, who told her they did not have Miralax but had similar medications. Lindsay texted Patrick to ask if he wanted to order takeout from the restaurant and called the restaurant to place the order at 5:10 p.m.

At Lindsay's request, Patrick left their residence to pick up the food and medication around 5:15 p.m. Lindsay texted him, "Pedia-Lax liquid stool softener" shortly after. At 5:32 p.m., he stopped at the drugstore. Surveillance video showed him calling Lindsay about which medication to buy. Lindsay did not pick up immediately but called back a minute later. This call lasted only 14 seconds and was made while Lindsay's phone was locked. Patrick later testified that she seemed busy. He arrived at the restaurant at 5:54 p.m. and returned home shortly after 6:00 p.m.

While her husband was gone, Lindsay strangled their three children one by one with exercise bands in the basement. She then cut her wrists and neck and jumped from a second-story window in an apparent suicide attempt. Lindsay sustained spinal cord injuries from the fall, paralyzing her from the waist down.

In subsequent legal filings, Lindsay alleged that she heard a male voice directing her to commit the acts. She claimed that she woke up that morning with suicidal thoughts and in the afternoon, a voice began to tell her to harm the children. After Patrick left to pick up the food, she said the voice became loud, demanding, and repeatedly told her, "This is your last chance. You have to kill the kids so you can kill yourself." Lindsay claimed that a force took over her and that she "felt an overwhelming, irresistible compulsion to comply".

=== Emergency response ===
Patrick testified that when he returned home, the house was "unusually quiet". While looking for his family, he placed an unanswered call to Lindsay's phone at 6:09 p.m. He discovered blood in an upstairs bedroom, the window of which was open. He ran outside and found Lindsay lying on the ground, injured and semi-conscious. He called 911 and police responded at 6:11 p.m.

While still on the phone with 911, Patrick entered the house to look for the children. He found all three in the basement; each was unconscious and in medical distress, with exercise bands still wrapped around their necks. Cora (age five) and Callan (eight months) were on the floor of the basement's den, while Dawson (age three) was found alone on the floor of Patrick's basement home office. Responders attempted resuscitation. The children were taken to Beth Israel Deaconess Hospital – Plymouth, where Cora and Dawson were pronounced dead. Callan arrived at the hospital in cardiac arrest. He was flown by medical helicopter to Boston Children's Hospital, where doctors determined that he had suffered a severe brain injury due to lack of oxygen. Callan was declared brain dead and removed from life support on January 27.

Lindsay was taken to South Shore Hospital before being transferred to Brigham and Women's Hospital. In the early morning of January 25, she went into cardiac arrest. She was revived after CPR and multiple blood transfusions. Eitan Negri, a physician assistant, testified that while lacerations on her left and right wrists were severe enough to require stitches, the cuts on her neck were "superficial".

On January 26, while still intubated, Lindsay was interviewed by forensic psychiatrist Jhilam Biswas. Lindsay was unable to speak but could communicate by writing. Among the questions she asked Biswas were, "Do I have an attorney?", "Is my body broken?", and "Are my legs straight?" She also asked if she could have visitors and where her family was. Biswas testified that Lindsay demonstrated sufficient mental competency to consent to surgery. On January 29, Lindsay was deemed competent enough to change her healthcare proxy from Patrick to her parents. Lindsay also asked to sign a do not resuscitate order, but doctors did not allow it due to her mental health and apparent suicide attempt.

== Investigation ==
The basement room where first responders found the bodies of Clancy's children on January 24, 2023

Duxbury Police officers responded to the Clancy residence on January 24, 2023. They contacted the Massachusetts State Police Detective Unit and began an investigation. Investigators reviewed surveillance footage, cellphone records, internet search history, and communications between Lindsay and Patrick in an effort to reconstruct the events leading up to the deaths.

The Office of the Chief Medical Examiner determined that Cora and Dawson died from asphyxia and that Callan died from complications of asphyxia.

The police executed 11 search warrants and collected physical, biological, and digital evidence from the Clancys' residence, including cameras, laptops, prescription medications, and blood stain DNA. Police also recovered several notebooks in which Lindsay documented her mental state and medical treatment. Although investigators attempted to recover fingerprints from exercise bands and a bloody knife collected from the home, they were unable to obtain useful impressions.

The Massachusetts State Police Crime Lab tested swabs taken from the handle and middle portions of the exercise bands. DNA analysis identified genetic material from all five members of the Clancy family on the end of a blue exercise band found with Callan. Cora's DNA was found in a "red-brown stain" on the basement floor, and Lindsay's DNA was found on bloodstained roof shingles from the back of the house.

Blood samples were taken from Lindsay at the hospital on January 24. According to the prosecution, toxicology analysis identified seven prescription medications in her system. Prosecutors said the concentrations of two medications, Remeron and Seroquel, indicated that they had been consumed about two hours prior. Forensic psychiatrist Gregory Saathoff stated during the trial that Lindsay told him she took pills in lemonade in an attempted overdose. Evidence revealed during the trial showed a wine tumbler on the bedside table alongside the bloody knife that contained white residue. This tumbler was never tested in a laboratory.

== Criminal trial ==
=== Pre-trial proceedings ===
On January 25, 2023, authorities obtained an arrest warrant charging Lindsay with three counts of strangulation, three counts of assault and battery with a dangerous weapon, and two counts of murder in connection with the deaths of Cora and Dawson. After Callan died on January 27, prosecutors added a third murder charge. On February 7, Lindsay was arraigned in Plymouth District Court via Zoom from her hospital bed and pleaded not guilty. She was later transferred to Tewksbury Hospital, where she remained in state custody while awaiting trial.

On September 15, 2023, a Plymouth County grand jury indicted Lindsay on three counts each of first-degree murder and strangulation, moving her case to Plymouth Superior Court. Lindsay was arraigned on October 26 from Tewksbury Hospital and again pleaded not guilty.

Over the following years, prosecutors and defense attorneys litigated issues relating to expert testimony, medical records, and other evidence concerning Lindsay's mental condition. The defense indicated that it would pursue a lack-of-criminal-responsibility defense based on postpartum psychosis and other mental illnesses. In July 2026, prosecutors dismissed the strangulation charges, describing them as redundant with the murder counts.

The trial's start date was postponed three times, with both prosecution and defense attorneys agreeing that it was a "discovery-intensive case" requiring extensive preparatory time. The proceedings attracted significant media attention, and in November 2025 defense attorneys filed a motion to change venues from Plymouth Superior Court to Suffolk Superior Court in Boston. They argued that media coverage in the area had been prejudicial and that it would be impossible to find unbiased jurors in Plymouth. The prosecution rebutted that the local community was large enough to provide a sufficient jury pool and that people in Boston would have heard about the case as well. Judge William Sullivan denied the venue change.

==== Offer to stipulate to the deaths ====
Lindsay's defense was led by veteran criminal defense attorney Kevin Reddington. In December 2025, Reddington filed notice that he planned to pursue the insanity defense and, in January 2026, Lindsay acknowledged in a medical malpractice lawsuit filing that she had killed the children.

In March 2026, Reddington requested a "bifurcated trial". He proposed that the first phase of the trial would determine whether Lindsay was guilty and, if she was found guilty, that the second phase would determine whether she was mentally aware and criminally responsible. He argued that trying both topics simultaneously would endanger Lindsay's Fifth Amendment rights because she would be forced to admit to her involvement in the crime while explaining her lack of responsibility. Prosecutors countered that by initiating an insanity defense, Lindsay had essentially already waived her right against self-incrimination. Sullivan denied the bifurcation request on March 31 due to overlapping evidence and witnesses.

Reddington filed a motion for reconsideration a week later. This time, he offered that Lindsay was willing to "stipulate formally in writing to her involvement in the underlying conduct resulting in the death of the three young children". Such a stipulation would relieve prosecutors of their burden to prove the proffered facts beyond a reasonable doubt. Prosecutors responded that they would "not agree to any stipulations of fact regarding the violent and painful murders", choosing to present evidence to a jury instead of accepting Lindsay's admission of guilt. Sullivan rejected Reddington's request once again on April 22.

=== Trial ===
Commonwealth v. Lindsay Clancy
- Court: Plymouth Superior Court
- Started: July 20, 2026
- Decided: September 4, 2026; 2 months ago
- Verdict: Mistrial due to a hung jury
- Charge: Three counts of first-degree murder; Three counts of strangulation or suffocation (dismissed)

Case history
- Appealed to: Massachusetts Supreme Judicial Court (denied)

Court membership
- Judge sitting: William Sullivan

The trial began with jury selection on July 20, 2026. Judge Sullivan announced he would seat 18 jurors, including six alternates. Opening arguments were held July 27. The proceedings lasted nearly six weeks and included testimony from more than 80 witnesses and over 300 exhibits. Jurors were also taken to visit the home where the killings occurred. Closing arguments were heard on August 27, 2026.

During the trial, Reddington offered a new stipulation of facts related to the DNA evidence. On August 4, Sullivan asked Lindsay if she understood the implications of her stipulation. Lindsay responded affirmatively, the first time that she spoke during her trial. Reddington reiterated that Lindsay was not contesting that she killed her children and said the stipulation was meant to relieve the government of "having to bring in dozens, if not more, witnesses to prove chain of custody of blood, fluids, the bands, DNA, all of that."

Patrick testified during the first week of the trial about Lindsay's mental health in the months preceding the killings and the events of January 24, 2023. The jury was played the 911 call he made after returning home and discovering her outside the house and the children in the basement. Patrick testified that Lindsay had appeared to be doing well on the day of the killings and that he had not been concerned about leaving her alone with the children.

==== Defense case ====
Defense attorneys argued that Lindsay was a loving mother who suffered a psychotic break after months of deteriorating mental health. While not disputing that she killed her children, the defense contended that she had been experiencing postpartum psychosis and bipolar disorder and was unable to understand the nature of her actions at the time of the killings.

Reddington argued that Lindsay had been misdiagnosed and improperly medicated, and that her healthcare providers had missed warning signs by failing to coordinate her treatment. He emphasized that Lindsay's providers did not seek complete medical records and did not speak to each other. During cross-examination, both medical providers Tufts and Jollotta testified that they relied on Lindsay to provide updates about her treatment, even after her condition worsened and she began seeking emergency care and hospitalization. Jollotta testified that she was unaware Tufts had continued treating Lindsay after September 2022.

Lindsay's journals were presented as documentation of her declining mental health in the months before the killings. Her journal entries described insomnia, intrusive thoughts, a persistent "brain fog", and concerns about her ability to care for her children, while also tracking her medications and treatment. A note on her phone from November 2022 read, "I will get through this. I will overcome postpartum anxiety and depression. I am a great mom. I love my kids." Reddington also highlighted how the quality of Lindsay's journal entries deteriorated over time, becoming progressively less detailed and almost illegible in the weeks leading up to the killings. "Look at this as she runs into January. There's nothing other than little chicken scratches because her mind was gone in January as she's on these drugs, and she's suffering from what you've heard as postpartum depression, that can lead to postpartum psychosis," he told the jurors.

The defense's expert witnesses attributed the killings to severe mental illness. Forensic psychiatrist Phillip Resnick testified that Lindsay had been suffering from postpartum psychosis and was "clearly psychotic" on the day of the killings. He told the court, "It was almost like she was a puppet and someone else was pulling the strings." Psychologist Paul Zeizel similarly concluded that Lindsay lacked criminal responsibility and testified that she "had no appreciation for the wrongfulness of her act."

Lindsay's mother, Paula, and sister, Allison, testified for the defense about changes they had observed in her mental health during the months before the killings. Her mother said that Lindsay had become increasingly anxious and fearful and had expressed suicidal thoughts. At one point, Lindsay became so fearful that she asked Paula to sleep beside her. Her sister recounted conversations in which Lindsay discussed suicidal ideation and concerns about her mental health. Patrick's mother, Susan, testified that Lindsay had repeatedly sought help as her condition worsened and had become fearful about taking her prescribed medications. She recalled Lindsay telling her shortly before the killings that she needed help and was concerned about her mental state. The family's nanny, Elaine Rossi, described Lindsay as a "wonderful mom" and testified that she had never been concerned about her interactions with the children.

The defense also criticized the police investigation, arguing that investigators prematurely concluded that Lindsay had intentionally killed her children and failed to fully explore evidence. The day before closing arguments, Reddington asked Sullivan to instruct jurors that if they believed the police investigation contained gaps or other flaws, a faulty investigation could be a reason to acquit Lindsay. Reddington said investigators had "basically accepted the fact that she strangled the kids, the kids were in the basement, she's guilty, and we can move on. They didn't investigate anything." Sullivan declined to give the requested instruction but told the defense it could raise the issue during closing arguments.

==== Prosecution case ====
Assistant District Attorneys Jennifer Sprague and Shanan Buckingham of the Plymouth County District Attorney's office represented the Commonwealth of Massachusetts in prosecuting the case against Lindsay. While acknowledging that she had struggled with mental illness, the prosecutors alleged that Lindsay's actions before the killings showed planning and rational thought. "This was not a woman in the throes of psychosis on January 24, 2023," said Buckingham during opening arguments. "This was a woman who acted intentionally, rationally, and swiftly to accomplish a very specific goal—to kill."

The Commonwealth emphasized testimony from Lindsay's treating clinicians, none of whom reported observing psychosis during their interactions with her. Jurors were told that Lindsay repeatedly denied experiencing homicidal thoughts and that, during a virtual appointment with Tufts the day before the killings, denied both suicidal and homicidal ideation. The prosecution also called psychiatrist Gregory Saathoff and psychologist Kirk Heilbrun, both of whom had interviewed Lindsay about the commanding voice she claimed to have heard. Saathoff and Heilbrun said it was unusual that Lindsay claimed to have heard the voice only once and did not report hearing it again after the killings.

Prosecutors also argued that Lindsay made multiple deliberate decisions before and during the killings that were inconsistent with an uncontrollable psychotic episode. They noted that the voice Lindsay claimed to have heard was vague: "She had to choose where—the basement. She had to choose how—strangulation. She had to choose with what—exercise band," said Sprague. The prosecution alleged that Lindsay plotted to be alone with the children by sending Patrick on errands, and that she had looked up how long the drive would be to estimate how much time she would have. After Saathoff testified that Lindsay said she killed Dawson first, they alleged this was because she considered Dawson a "handful" and more likely to struggle.

During the trial, prosecutors implied that Lindsay had faked her suicide attempt. Sprague alleged that Lindsay had climbed out of the second-story window and either dropped or slid down rather than jumping or hurling herself out. Prosecutors highlighted testimony from first responders and emergency department clinicians who said the cuts to Lindsay's neck and wrists were superficial and not bleeding, though the defense argued that the lack of bleeding may have been due to the cold temperature outside that night. The prosecution also called a forensic toxicologist who testified that the concentrations of medications in Lindsay's blood were "not consistent" with an attempted overdose. However, at other points of the trial prosecutors alleged that the suicide attempt was sincere and that Lindsay had killed the children first because she did not trust anyone else to care for them. "There's no dispute that Lindsay Clancy was suffering from mental illness and that she tried to kill herself," said Sprague during closing arguments.

=== Jury deliberations ===
The jury began deliberations on August 27, 2026. Following closing arguments, 12 of the 18 jurors selected for the trial were randomly chosen to deliberate, while the remaining six were designated as alternates. The deliberating jury consisted of three men and nine women. Reporter Sue O'Connell described the foreperson as a woman appearing to be in her 70s who was an attentive listener and took notes throughout the trial.

During deliberations, jurors considered five possible verdicts: guilty of first-degree murder, guilty of second-degree murder, guilty of manslaughter, not guilty, or not guilty by reason of lack of criminal responsibility. On the second day of deliberations, the jury asked to view the knife Lindsay had used in her attempted suicide and two ziploc bags containing pill bottles—the only exhibits to which they had not been given access.

On September 1, at the start of the fourth day of deliberations, the jury informed Judge Sullivan that it was unable to reach a unanimous verdict. Sullivan instructed jurors to continue deliberating. At the end of the day, a woman was arrested outside the courthouse and charged with "aggravated intimidation of a juror". Authorities said she had been caught filming the jurors as they left for the day. She pleaded not guilty and said that she had been trying to record a video of Lindsay.

Before deliberations resumed on September 2, Sullivan individually questioned the jurors about the incident involving the woman who had been filming and found no issues. Later that day, the jury reported that it remained deadlocked. Sullivan asked them to resume deliberations and read the Tuey–Rodriguez charge, also known as the Allen charge, or "dynamite charge", urging jurors to reexamine their positions without surrendering conscientiously held beliefs. Under Massachusetts law, a judge can only ask a jury to resume deliberations twice, unless it consents to continue deliberating.

==== Holdout juror and mistrial ====
On September 3, the sixth day of deliberations, the jury's foreperson sent a note alleging that a holdout juror was preventing a unanimous verdict by not following instructions on reasonable doubt of guilt. According to the defense, the remaining 11 jurors intended to acquit Lindsay. Judge Sullivan privately questioned each juror and reminded them that proof beyond a reasonable doubt does not mean proof beyond all possible doubt. After the jury left the room, defense attorney Reddington petitioned to remove the holdout juror, who he said was refusing to follow the law. Sullivan, citing a desire to remain neutral, declined to remove the juror.

In a heated exchange with Sullivan on September 4, Reddington reiterated his request to remove the juror. Sullivan refused and said, "The note indicates that the juror has acknowledged doubt but refuses to apply it. That note does not indicate that the juror refuses to follow the law." Later that day, the jury sent a third note stating that it remained deadlocked.

After 38 hours of deliberations, Sullivan initially declared a mistrial but then granted a one-hour stay for Reddington to seek emergency interlocutory appeal with the Massachusetts Supreme Judicial Court. Arguing before Dalila Argaez Wendlandt, Reddington asked for the holdout juror to be either questioned or removed. His filing alleged that the juror was exhibiting bias against Lindsay's mental illness, which would be cause for removal. After Wendlandt denied the defense's motion, Sullivan officially declared a mistrial. Following the mistrial declaration, the parties scheduled a status hearing for September 29.

== Trial aftermath ==
Three jurors publicly discussed the deliberations during an interview with NBC10 Boston. Jury foreperson Ronni Carlson claimed that the holdout juror acknowledged having reasonable doubt but nevertheless declined to return a verdict of not guilty by reason of lack of criminal responsibility. Carlson and juror Paula Devlin criticized the holdout's participation, and a third juror, Kellie Farina, criticized the prosecution's presentation of the case. An anonymous juror separately told WBZ-TV that the holdout juror had not been the only juror unwilling to reconsider their position during the deliberations. The holdout juror denied that he had doubts, saying that: "As I tried to explain different possible theories during deliberation, I kept getting cut off as if I had doubts based on the evidence presented. Based on all the physical evidence, key witnesses, and what the prosecution presented, I thought it was enough proof that she [Clancy] knew exactly what she was doing and planned."

United States President Donald Trump condemned Lindsay's actions and stated: "Look, she did a horrible, horrible thing. Can't be worse, but you'll find out what the price to pay is. There'll be a price. It's going to be mental institution or jail or something, but I guess they're going to go through another trial. It's too bad." On September 8, during an interview with Good Morning America, Reddington asked President Trump to pardon Lindsay, although presidential pardon powers do not extend to state criminal charges. Reddington later said that he knew Trump could not pardon Lindsay and that his goal was instead to seek the president's help and influence regarding the prosecution.

At the status hearing on September 29, Reddington argued that there was "no evidence" that Lindsay killed the children, which according to CBS News "appeared to conflict with arguments he made repeatedly before and during the trial". Prosecutors did not state whether they intended to retry Lindsay, and a new hearing was set for November 2. On November 2, prosecuters announced their intentions to retry Lindsay. Sullivan set a hearing for November 16, at which prosecutors will announce the charges they intend to pursue against Lindsay. On November 9, Sullivan denied Reddington's request to dismiss the charges. At the status hearing on November 16, Sullivan set a retrial date for March 29, 2027.

== Civil litigation ==
In January 2026, Lindsay and Patrick filed separate civil lawsuits in Norfolk Superior Court against the healthcare providers who had treated Lindsay before the killings. The lawsuits remain open and active as of August 2026.

Patrick's lawsuit, filed on behalf of himself and the estates of Cora, Dawson, and Callan, alleged wrongful death and medical negligence. It named psychiatrist Jennifer Tufts, psychiatric nurse practitioner Rebecca Jollotta, and their employers, Aster Mental Health and South Shore Health System. The suit alleged that the defendants failed to recognize Lindsay's deteriorating mental health and improperly prescribed and monitored psychiatric medications. A hearing in the case was held on October 28, 2026.

Lindsay's lawsuit alleged medical malpractice and negligence against 11 defendants. In addition to the defendants in Patrick's suit, Lindsay also sued five other individual providers, Women & Infants Hospital of Rhode Island, and McLean Hospital. The suit alleged that inadequate treatment and medication management contributed to the deterioration of her mental health. It seeks damages including "past and future medical expenses, past and future lost wages, pain and suffering, emotional distress, including the knowledge that she killed her children, loss of enjoyment of life, permanent disability, and other damages in an amount to be determined at trial."

== Public response ==
=== Local community ===
The deaths prompted widespread grief in Duxbury and surrounding communities. Residents held vigils for the children and left flowers and stuffed animals near the family's home. Responding police officers were given time off to process the crime. They received an outpouring of support from the Duxbury community, which sent food, cards, gifts, and emails to the police department. Duxbury Public Schools released a statement describing the incident as a heartbreaking tragedy and offered resources to students, staff, and families who may have been affected. On the one-year anniversary of the deaths, the nonprofit "With Love, From Duxbury" hosted a memorial service at a local church.

Days after the deaths, Patrick posted a public statement in which he described the children as "the essence of my life". He also urged the public to forgive Lindsay, whom he characterized as mentally ill rather than malicious. Patrick put the Duxbury home up for sale and relocated to New York City in spring 2023. He filed for divorce from Lindsay in February 2024 and moved in with a new girlfriend in 2025, whom he married in April 2026.

=== Public interest and media coverage ===
The trial attracted extensive public and media attention and became one of the most closely followed criminal proceedings in the United States at the time. National news organizations provided daily coverage of courtroom testimony, and proceedings were livestreamed to large online audiences. The case also generated substantial discussion on social media platforms, podcasts, online forums, and cable news programs. Kathryn Coduto, a professor of media science at Boston University, said, "The case has permeated across digital and social media, traditional media, 24-hour news, newspapers. It's everywhere, and there's been a much wider variety of content than you typically see in true crime cases." Commentators attributed the trial's prominence to the complex questions it raised about the mental healthcare system, postpartum mental illness, and criminal responsibility.

At the courthouse, journalists and members of the public arrived hours before sessions began in hopes of securing seats in the gallery. Lindsay's defense case drew supporters who attended throughout the trial. The largest showing occurred in late August, when hundreds of supporters rallied outside Plymouth Superior Court. Participants, many of whom wore pink, said the case resonated with their own experiences of postpartum illness or other psychiatric conditions. Other spectators arrived to support the prosecution, arguing that Lindsay had murdered her children and that public attention had shifted away from them.

The scale of public engagement led news outlets to compare the trial to other high-profile criminal proceedings that attracted national audiences and intense public interest. The case has been compared to that of Andrea Yates, who drowned her children in 2001 and was later found not guilty due to postpartum psychosis. It also drew comparisons to professional wrestler Chris Benoit, who murdered his wife and son in a 2007 double-murder and suicide and was later found to have severe chronic traumatic encephalopathy (CTE). The Clancy trial was also the subject of TikTok conspiracy theories alleging that Patrick killed the children and framed Lindsay.

The identity of the juror who held out was subjected to media scrutiny, with NBC10 Boston reportedly digging into the still anonymous juror on September 11, 2026. The judge decided to indefinitely impound the juror list on September 14, 2026, when the identity of the juror was exposed on social media, citing jurors' privacy concerns.

=== Fundraisers ===
A GoFundMe campaign created to assist Patrick with "medical bills, funeral services, and legal help" raised more than $1 million from over 13,000 donors. In May 2023, Reddington, Lindsay's criminal defense attorney, told The Boston Globe that Lindsay's parents had paid for her defense and that "not one cent" from the GoFundMe had gone toward it. "I am not going to comment about Patrick, but every nickel that's been spent on her defense has come from her parents", Reddington said.

In 2026, Lindsay's supporters launched a new GoFundMe benefiting her parents. The fundraiser, created to help cover costs the couple had incurred over the previous three years, also raised more than $1 million.

After the trial, a GiveSendGo fundraiser was created for the holdout juror to help cover security expenses, attorney fees, and lost wages; it has raised more than $300,000 as of September 18, 2026.

== See also ==
- Constance Fisher
- Khoua Her
