= William F. Sullivan =

American jurist and lawyer (born 1957)

Associate Justice of the Massachusetts Superior Court
- Incumbent
- Assumed office May 21, 2014
- Appointed by: Deval Patrick
- Preceded by: D. Lloyd MacDonald

Personal details
- Born: William Francis Sullivan; June 15, 1957 (age 69) Boston, Massachusetts, U.S.
- Spouse: Mary Lou
- Children: 3
- Education: University of Notre Dame (BA); Boston College (JD)

William Francis Sullivan (born June 15, 1957) is an American jurist and lawyer. He is an associate justice for the Massachusetts Superior Court.

== Early life and education ==
William Sullivan was born on June 15, 1957. He graduated from Xaverian Brothers High School in Westwood, Massachusetts. He then received his undergraduate degree from the University of Notre Dame and his J.D. from the Boston College Law School.

== Career ==
Prior to his judicial career, Sullivan was a partner at his firm of Sullivan and Sweeney, LLP in Quincy, Massachusetts. He also previously served as a special assistant city solicitor for Quincy from 2006 to 2008 and as a prosecutor for the Norfolk County, Massachusetts, District Attorney’s Office from 1982 to 1984. He was nominated to the state superior court by former governor Deval Patrick in April 2014, and his nomination was confirmed by the Governor's Council on May 21, 2014. Sullivan may serve on the court until he reaches the mandatory retirement age of 70. In 2026, he presided over the trial of Lindsay Clancy, who was accused of first-degree murder by the Commonwealth of Massachusetts in relation to the strangling of her three children in 2023.

== Personal life ==
He and his wife, Mary Lou, have three children: Will, Conor and Brennan Sullivan.
