= Pat Walsh (social entrepreneur) =

American social entrepreneur (born 1979)

- Born: October 14, 1979
- Education: Xaverian Brothers High School; UMass Amherst, B.S.
- Years active: 2006
- Employer: Classy
- Title: Chief Impact Officer

Pat Walsh is an American social entrepreneur who is the co-founder and chief impact officer of Classy, an online fundraising platform for nonprofits and social enterprises.

== Career ==
Walsh co-founded Classy with Scot Chisholm in 2006. Since launching its online fundraising platform in 2011, Classy has helped more than 1,800 nonprofits and social enterprises including Oxfam, The World Food Programme and National Geographic Society to raise hundreds of millions of dollars. Walsh leads the annual Collaborative and Classy Awards event. The Collaborative convenes an array of thought leaders and experts in the social sector, including top NGOs, international agencies, institutional investors, social entrepreneurs, philanthropists and academics. The Classy Awards recognize excellence in social innovation and is the largest philanthropic awards ceremony in the U.S.

Walsh and Classy were selected by Bloomberg Businessweek as one of the Top 5 Most Promising Social Entrepreneurs in America in 2011. He has spoken at Clinton Global Initiative University, Harvard Social Innovation Collaborative, the UN High Commissioner of Refugees Innovation conference and is a guest speaker at UCSD Rady School of Management.

Prior to Classy, Walsh worked for General Dynamics in Program Management and the Advanced Nuclear Plant Studies group.

== Education ==
Walsh graduated from Xaverian Brothers High School in Westwood, Massachusetts in 1998 and received a bachelor of science degree in mechanical engineering with a minor focus in economics from the University of Massachusetts at Amherst 2003.
