= Tillys =

American retail clothing company

Tillys, Inc.

- Tillys store at the Southern Park Mall in Boardman, Ohio. Store opened in 2014.
- Formerly: World of Jeans and Tops (1982–1985)
- Type: Public
- Traded as: NYSE: TLYS (Class A); Russell 2000 Component
- Industry: Retail
- Founded: 1982; 44 years ago
- Founders: Hezy Shaked
- Headquarters: Irvine, California, U.S.
- Number of locations: 230 (2025)
- Area served: United States
- Key people: Hezy Shaked (Founder); Nate Smith (President and CEO); Mike Henry (CFO)
- Products: Athletic footwear & apparel; Athletic & recreational products
- Revenue: ▲US$ 775.8 million (2021)
- Operating income: ▲US$87.6 million (2021)
- Net income: ▲US$64.2 million (2021)
- Total assets: ▲US$505 million (2021)
- Number of employees: 4,000 (2021)
- Website: tillys.com

Tillys (originally known as World of Jeans and Tops and Tilly's) is an American retail clothing company that sells an assortment of branded apparel, accessories, shoes, and more. Tillys is headquartered and operated from Irvine, California.

== History ==
Hezy Shaked, a former Israel Navy officer, and his wife, Tilly Levine, opened "World of Jeans and Tops" in Los Alamitos, California in 1982. Shaked later renamed the store "Tilly’s" after his wife. The couple divorced in 1989, but Levine continued to work for the company as director of vendor relations. The company went public in May 2012, raising $124 million through its initial public offering of stock.

Tilly's underwent a significant operational turnaround through strategic store optimization, closing 28 underperforming locations gradually over a two-year period spanning from early 2024 through the first half of 2026, to reduce its brick-and-mortar footprint by 11%. Despite operating fewer storefronts, the retailer reported improved financial performance for the first quarter of fiscal 2026, with total net sales rising 15.9% to $124.7 million. This growth was driven by a 12.1% increase in physical store revenue and a 30.9% surge in e-commerce sales, which grew to represent 22.8% of the company's total business.

== Stores ==
Tillys stores are located in both traditional outdoor shopping centers and in shopping malls. The average store size is 7,900 square feet (734 m^{2}). Due to their size, Tillys locations in malls usually take up two or three store spaces. As of 2021, Tillys operates 240 stores in 33 states.

== Brands ==
Tillys primarily sells clothing, shoes, and accessories for various active lifestyles including surfing, skateboarding, and snowboarding along with sports such as motocross. Among the brands sold are Adidas, Billabong, DC Shoes, Element, Fox, Famous Stars and Straps, Elwood, Hurley, Nike SB, O'Neill, Quiksilver, RVCA, Vans, and Volcom, as well as an extensive selection of Levi's. They also sell store brands such as Blue Crown, RSQ, Micros, and West of Melrose.
