= Billy O'Sullivan (footballer) =

English footballer (born 1959)

William O'Sullivan
Personal information
- Full name: William Finbar O'Sullivan
- Date of birth: 5 October 1959 (age 67)
- Place of birth: Lambeth, England
- Position: Midfielder

Senior career*
Years	Team	Apps	(Gls)
1976–1978	Charlton Athletic	2	(0)
1978–1982	Dartford		
1984–1985	Gravesend & Northfleet		
- * Club domestic league appearances and goals

William Finbar O'Sullivan (born 5 October 1959) is an English former professional footballer who played in the Football League as a midfielder. He also played non-league football for clubs including Dartford, Gravesend & Northfleet, Fisher Athletic, Dover Athletic, Crawley Town, Dulwich Hamlet, Bromley and Margate. He represented the Republic of Ireland at youth level.

His son Callum John O’sullivan followed in his footsteps in regards to a football career, and played for Crystal Palace, Dartford, Erith town, Cray valley, and Lewisham borough
