= Black Mass (disambiguation) =

A Black Mass is a Satanic ritual.

Black Mass may also refer to:

== Arts and entertainment ==
=== Literature ===
- Black Mass: Apocalyptic Religion and the Death of Utopia, a 2007 book by John N. Gray
- Black Mass, a 2000 book by Dick Lehr and Gerard O'Neill

=== Music ===
- Black Mass Sonata, a 1913 composition by Alexander Scriabin
- Black Mass (album), a 2011 album by This Is Hell
- Black Mass Krakow 2004, a 2008 video by Gorgoroth
- "Black Mass" (song), a 2016 song by Creeper
- "Black Mass", a song by Danzig from their 2002 album I Luciferi

=== Other uses in arts and entertainment ===
- Black Mass (comics), a DC Comics character
- Black Mass (film), a 2015 American film
- A Black Mass, a 1966 play by Amiri Baraka
- The Black Mass, an American radio program

== Other uses ==
- Black mass (battery recycling), a common inactivated inorganic compound output from lithium-ion battery recycling
- Black body, an idealized physical body that absorbs all incident electromagnetic radiation
- Shadow person, a paranormal phenomenon also known as a "black mass"
