= Robert A. Fisher =

Robert A. Fisher (born 1975) is an American attorney and legal commentator based in Boston, Massachusetts. He is well known for his work on the Isabella Stewart Gardner Museum heist while at the U.S. Attorney's Office for the District of Massachusetts and his representation of MIT professor Gang Chen in one of the most prominent prosecutions under the Department of Justice's China Initiative. Charges against Chen were dismissed in January 2022 and the Initiative was ended shortly thereafter.

== Early life and education ==
Fisher was born in Revere, Massachusetts, and earned his undergraduate degree from Northeastern University and his Juris Doctor from Boston University School of Law in 2001.

== Career ==
Fisher began his career as an assistant district attorney for Middlesex County and then was an Assistant Attorney General for the Commonwealth of Massachusetts.

=== Federal prosecutor ===
Fisher joined the Massachusetts U.S. Attorney's Office in 2007. He and AUSA Fred Wyshak prosecuted the wife of Congressman John F. Tierney as part of an offshore gambling case against the congressman's brother-in-law, Robert Eremian. He also was part of the trial team that secured convictions against John O'Brien and his top deputies for patronage hiring at the Massachusetts Probation Service. However, the First Circuit overturned the conviction finding that the prosecution "overstepped its bounds in using federal criminal statutes to police the hiring practices."

As a prosecutor, Fisher is principally known for investigating the Isabella Stewart Gardner Museum heist while at the Office. During his tenure, he found a video tape of Museum guard Rick Abath letting someone into the museum the night before. The Office eventually released the video to the public. The grainy footage raised questions about how Abath could have known the individuals were police officers when he let them into the museum the following night. Fisher has been publicly skeptical that the heist was the work of organized crime or that the paintings were broken up or have ever been reliably seen since the night of the robbery, both of which are positions that have been publicly stated by the FBI.

=== Private practice ===
Fisher joined law firm Nixon Peabody in 2017, where he serves in firm leadership. He is known most prominently for his defense of MIT Professor Gang Chen and Georgia Tech Professor G.K. Chang on charges brought under the China Initiative.

==== China Initiative cases ====
In January 2021, MIT mechanical engineering professor Gang Chen was arrested on federal charges alleging that he had concealed ties to the People's Republic of China while receiving federal grant funding, as part of the DOJ's China Initiative. Upon his arrest, Fisher stated “Since Gang moved to this country over 30 years ago, his life has been the epitome of the American dream. He has dedicated his life to scientific advancement in mechanical engineering. He loves the United States and looks forward to vigorously defending these allegations.”

Over the next year, the case began to fall appear as witnesses told the DOJ that Chen's disclosures were either accurate or any omissions were not material. According to Chen, "a witness saying that I never was in a talent program...which was one of the government’s key allegations — was withheld for months until demanded by my lawyers." Almost a year later, the Government dropped the charges against Chen because, according to U.S. Attorney Rachael Rollins, "After a careful assessment of this new information in the context of all the evidence, our office has concluded that we can no longer meet our burden of proof at trial." The China Initiative was ended the next month.

Fisher represented Georgia Tech Professor Gee-Kung Chang when he was charged with wire and visa fraud related to his students working for ZTE which being Georgia Tech employees. A federal judge threw out nine of the 10 charges as improperly pled and the government agreed to dismiss the final charge after Chang completed a pretrial diversion program.

==== Other notable matters ====
Fisher represented John Vandemoer, Stanford University's former head sailing coach, who pleaded guilty in connection with the nationwide college admissions bribery scandal known as "Operation Varsity Blues". Vandemoer was one of only a few defendant who did not receive jail time, which The Wall Street Journal described as a setback for prosecutors. Judge Rya Zobel found that he was the least culpable of all defendants. He also represented Father Andrew Bushell in his case when he was charged with fraud related to PPP loans. That case was dismissed by the Government before trial.

== Media appearances ==
Fisher has been featured prominently in multiple documentaries and media programs mostly about the Gardner Museum theft:

- This Is a Robbery: The World's Biggest Art Heist (2021), Netflix
- Gardner Art Heist: Stealing Beauty (2024), CNN
- History's Greatest Heists with Pierce Brosnan (2023), History Channel

He was also prominently featured in the Netflix production of Operation Varsity Blues: The College Admissions Scandal.
