= Special police =

Specialized law enforcement agency or unit

Special police usually describes a law enforcement agency or unit within such an agency whose duties and responsibilities are significantly different from other forces in the same nation, jurisdiction, or from other personnel within the same agency, although there is no consistent international definition. Generally, special police personnel hold some level of police powers; sometimes they hold the same powers and authority of other law enforcement officers within their jurisdiction, more rarely they will have no powers beyond that of the average citizen, but at a minimum they will typically possess enhanced detainment and arrest authority. 'Special police' may also be used to describe individuals who are granted police powers incidental to their primary duties, such as welfare fraud investigators, certain security guards, child welfare investigators, and agricultural inspectors, among others. Special police personnel may work for governmental, public, or private entities. Special police personnel may be armed or unarmed.

'Special police' is also occasionally used when referring to an 'elite' law enforcement agency or unit, such as special weapons and tactics (SWAT) units or other similar paramilitary forces who have some level of police powers.

== Canada ==
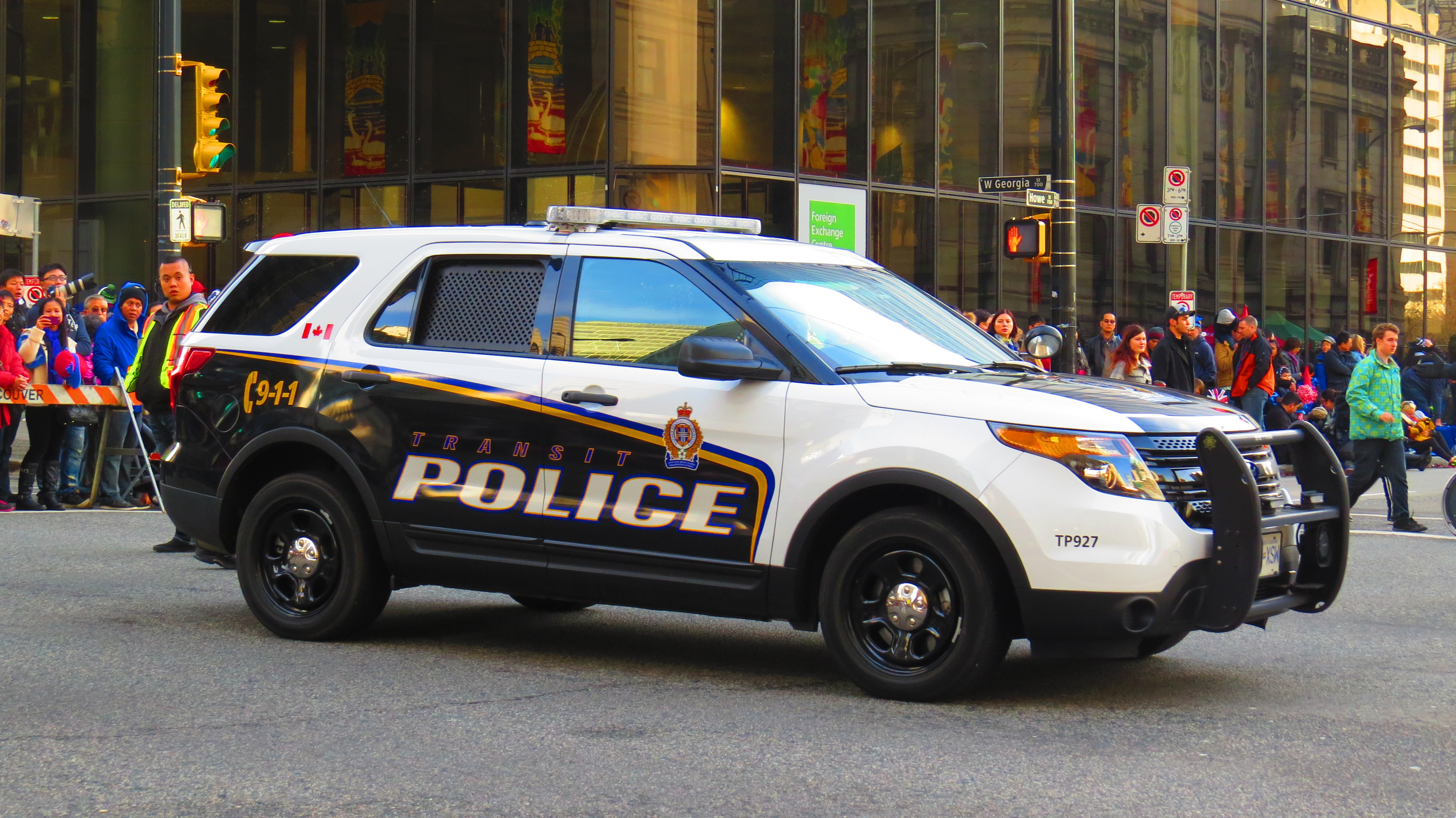
A Metro Vancouver Transit Police patrol car.

"Special police" is not a term used in Canada, but specialized police agencies exist in Alberta, British Columbia, Nova Scotia, and Ontario. Canada also makes use of special constables, a similar concept to "special police".

In Alberta, special police forces can be maintained by transit authorities and universities and are usually referred to as protective services. Protective services are staffed by unarmed community peace officers who have law enforcement powers but cannot enforce criminal legislation.

In British Columbia, any provincially-approved entity or First Nation can establish a designated policing unit (DPU) to supplement "the policing and law enforcement otherwise provided by the provincial police force or a municipal police department." Although officers of a DPU are armed police officers with the same authority as any other municipal police officer, designated policing units must comply with stricter regulations compared to municipal police services and are led by a Chief Officer, who has less authority over their staff than an ordinary police chief. As of 2022, there are three designated policing units in the province: the Metro Vancouver Transit Police, which provides police services to TransLink, the regional transit provider in the Vancouver metropolitan area; the Organized Crime Agency of British Columbia, which is responsible for investigating and prosecuting organized crime rings; and the Stlʼatlʼimx Tribal Police Service, which serves ten St'at'imc communities in the northern end of the Squamish-Lillooet Regional District.

There is one special police force in Nova Scotia, the Halifax-Dartmouth Bridge Commission Bridge Patrol. The Patrol is composed of special constables with limited police authority to enforce traffic violations on or near Bridge Commission property.

In Ontario, any organization can request the authority to raise a special constabulary from the local police services board. With some exceptions, officers employed by special constabularies do not carry guns and cannot refer to themselves as police. In general, special constables in Ontario employed by special constabularies have full police powers — including the ability to enforce the Criminal Code — but only on, between, or in relation to property owned by the organization that is responsible for the special constabulary. As of 2022, there is one special constabulary with armed employees, the Niagara Parks Police Service, which is responsible for providing police services to property owned or maintained by the Niagara Parks Commission. Special constabularies are also maintained by universities, transit systems, and public housing authorities.

== Former Yugoslavia ==
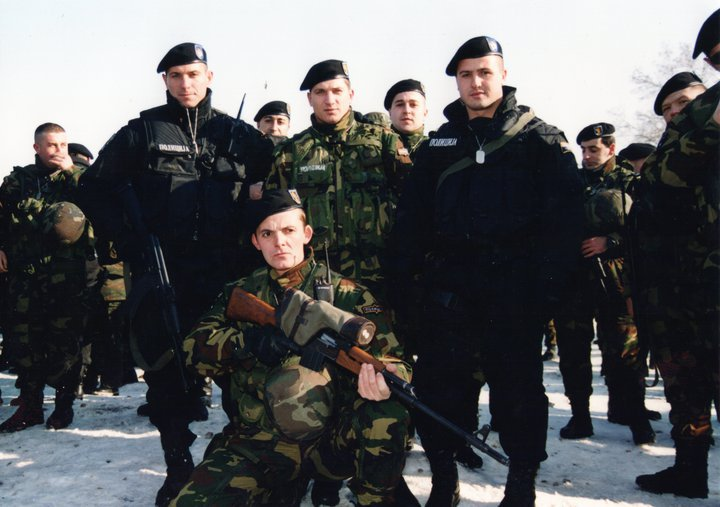
Special police of North Macedonia

The Special Police were a branch of the Regular Police who were used for restoring peace and stability if it had been heavily disturbed, counter-terrorism, countering violent groups, and repressing riots (especially in prisons). The Special Police also provided security and public peace, investigated and prevented organized crime, terrorism and other violent groups; protected state and private property; and helped and assisted civilians and other emergency forces in cases of emergency, natural disasters, civil unrest and armed conflicts.

== Greece ==
The term "Special (Police) Guards" (Greek: Ειδικοί φρουροί, romanized: Eidikoi frouroi) describes a special class of police personnel, employed on a 5-year contract to supplement regular police officers. The idea for the creation of the category is attributed to Michalis Chrisochoidis and Chief Ioannis Georgakopoulos and was realised in 1999. Special Guards number 2,000 out of the 65,000-strong force.

== Indonesia ==
Special police in Indonesia, locally known as Kepolisian Khusus, refer to law enforcement agencies outside the Indonesian National Police. These law enforcement agencies are under supervision and are trained by the National Police. They include the Agricultural and Animal Quarantine Police, Forestry Police, Municipal Police, Prison Police, Railroad Police and Special Police for Management of Marine, Coastal Region and Remote Islands.

The Indonesian National Police also have their own special police unit, the POLSUSPAS (Police Special Penitentiary). It is a Special Police Corps (Special Police) as well as ASN (Civil Servants) under the Ministry of Law and Human Rights. It is tasked with supervising, coaching, security and safety for convicts and detainees.

== New Zealand ==
Aside from the New Zealand Police, special powers are derived in legislation for customs officers, Fisheries Officers, and Fire Police. The Fire Police hold the full legal powers of a Police Constable when on official duty; Customs Officers, Fishery Officers, and Aviation Security Officers have limited powers (including the power to arrest or detain) in particular circumstances.

== Northern Cyprus ==
- TRNC Special Operation Department

== United Kingdom ==
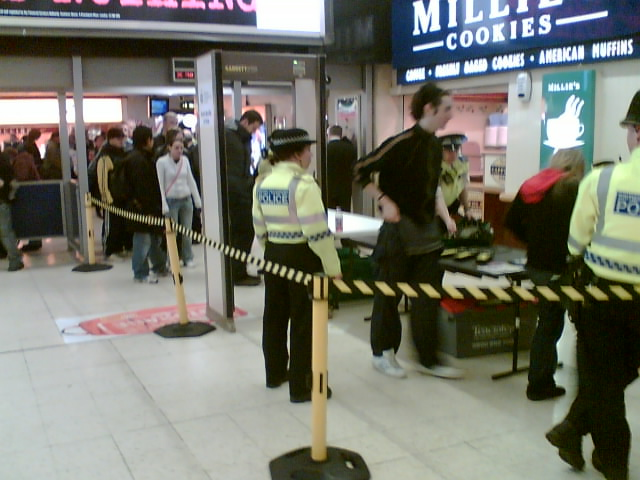
Police officers of the British Transport Police conducting proactive searches for knives and other weapons

In the United Kingdom, special police force has a special meaning in law and describes one of the forces defined as such in legislation including:

- Serious Organised Crime and Police Act 2005
- Police, Public Order and Criminal Justice (Scotland) Act 2006
- Police and Justice Act 2006

These are managed by government departments other than the Home Office, and have duties and responsibilities associated with particular legal or illegal activities rather than the geographical areas which are served by a single territorial police force.

There are three such forces:

- British Transport Police: Responsible for policing the rail network in Great Britain.
- Civil Nuclear Constabulary: Non-military nuclear installations and non-military nuclear material in transit.
- Ministry of Defence Police: Ministry of Defence property, personnel, other defence interests, UK nuclear weapons and special nuclear materials.

The National Crime Agency (whose full powers are limited to England and Wales) is not a police force but an agency responsible "to the Home Secretary and, through the Home Secretary, to Parliament." The NCA has the power to direct police forces within England and Wales, and the British Transport Police, to provide officers or undertake specific activities. Within Scotland and Northern Ireland, however, the power to direct assistance is limited to reflect the devolved administration of policing. The NCA enabling legislation does not allow the Home Secretary to give "directed tasking arrangements" to Scottish or Northern Irish police forces. NCA officers can be 'triple warranted' – with powers of a police officer, immigration officer and customs officer.

== United States ==
Within the United States, 'special police' may refer to:

- Auxiliary, reserve, or special police; members of volunteer, unpaid or paid, part-time unit of a larger, full-service law enforcement agency (such as the NYPD Auxiliary)
- Company or private police (see private policing in the United States)
- Fire police
- Security police or private security officers granted law enforcement authority
- State- or jurisdiction-specific variations of "special police officer", such as Massachusetts' "Special State Police Officer", or Kentucky and New Jersey's "Special Law Enforcement Officer"

While no single definition of "special police" prevails across the United States, it is typically understood to mean either a law enforcement agency working for a unique jurisdiction (such as a hospital or park) or a law enforcement officer whose authority, training, and experience may differ somewhat from a "regular" law enforcement officer (LEO).

The term can also refer to limited police power granted in some jurisdictions to lifeguards, SPCA personnel, teachers, and other public sector employees which is incidental to their main responsibilities.

The specific powers granted to special police officers vary widely from state to states and sometimes within a single state. Some states, such as Maryland, New York, and the District of Columbia, grant full police/peace officer authority to SPOs for use in whatever area they are employed to protect. They may make traffic stops in their jurisdiction if they have had accredited training. They are also permitted to conduct traffic control and investigations pertaining to the area protected by them.

In some jurisdictions, SPOs may be granted only limited arrest authority in specific circumstances, while in still other jurisdictions, SPOs are granted no more authority than an otherwise private citizen could exercise in effecting a citizen's arrest. Many jurisdictions permit SPOs to carry a firearm (some even while off-duty, with some SPOs being covered under LEOSA), but some are not permitted to do so. Even in the latter case, however, they are typically permitted to carry at least OC spray (pepper spray), a baton, and/or handcuffs.

Some SPOs are permitted to conduct traffic stops. In these cases, the SPOs typically (although not always) hold "full" police powers. SPOs that are primarily responsible for law enforcement in a given jurisdiction (such as hospital or campus police) are more likely to hold this authority than, for example, an SPO working for a municipality's law enforcement agency as an auxiliary law enforcement officer.

Uniforms of SPOs also vary widely. SPOs that hold no or limited police authority are typically uniformed in a manner that makes it immediately apparent that they are not "regular" law enforcement. This may range from distinctly different color uniforms than what local regular LEOs wear to some sort of patch or badge clearly identifying them as "special", "reserve", or "auxiliary" LEOs. SPOs whom hold "full" law enforcement authority typically wear uniforms that are similar to other local LEOs. While individual departments are usually given a wide latitude in the wear of their uniforms, some states have specific laws, codes, or regulations that require special police to be clearly identified as such.

=== California ===
The San Francisco Patrol Special Police is a neighborhood police force authorized in the City Charter, with officers appointed and regulated by the Police Commission after an initial security review by the San Francisco Police Department. Hourly rates for service are principally paid by private clients, with some cost to the city for general program administration concerning standards of professional performance, but not concerning day-to-day operations. Thus, the nature of this special police force is both quasi-private and quasi-public. The force has been in operation in the United States, city of San Francisco for over 162 years. By current City Code the force provides patrols on the streets of San Francisco as well as at fixed locations, and also provides a range of other safety services as requested by private clients.

=== Kentucky ===
In Kentucky, special police officers are Special Law Enforcement Officers (SLEO). They are sworn peace officers with limited jurisdiction. They have full legal police powers; explicitly including arrest authority, the ability to carry a weapon, and use emergency vehicles. However, their jurisdiction is specifically limited to public property that they have been hired to protect. While Kentucky law allows both the State and local governments to use SLEO's, most are used by the Kentucky State Police in the Facilities Security Branch.

=== Massachusetts ===
Within the Commonwealth of Massachusetts, "special police" usually refers to Special State Police Officers (SSPOs) whom are law enforcement officers typically employed by a college, university, or hospital police force. SSPOs must attend and graduate any of the 20-week Recruit Officer Courses (the same academies attended by municipal LEOs across the commonwealth) approved by the Municipal Police Training Council (MPTC). SSPOs typically have the same police powers as "regular" police officers within the commonwealth, although they may only exercise it pursuant to their duties and usually only while on their employer's property.

Massachusetts law provides that campus police officers of the University of Massachusetts be accorded the powers and status of a "regular" police officer when duly-appointed.

Massachusetts law also provides the apparatus for appointment as "regular" police officers for campus police officers of other state universities and colleges as well as community colleges. This is covered under two statutes; MGL, Part I, Title XII, Chapter 73, Section 18 and MGL, Part I, Title II, Chapter 15A, Section 22. However, it has become nearly universal practice for such institutions' law enforcement agencies to obtain SSPO commissions for their officers, in addition to the powers statutorily granted to them. This practice is only statutorily required of campus police officers employed by private institutions, as outlined by MGL, Part I, Title II, Chapter 22C, Section 63. This practice does not accord such officers any additional authority - nor does it serve to limit to it - and it is unclear why this practice has become commonplace.

Officers and investigators of the Massachusetts Department of Correction (MADOC) and parole officers of the Massachusetts Parole Board (MPB) are also authorized to be sworn as SSPOs upon recommendation by the MADOC commissioner or chairman of the Massachusetts Parole Board, respectively, given they meet SSPO training requirements. Like other SSPOs, they may only exercise their police powers while on-duty and pursuant to their specific duties. MADOC SSPOs are permitted to exercise their police powers in and around Massachusetts penal institutions, while transporting prisoners, and in order to prevent a prisoner from escaping. Both MADOC and MPB SSPOs are permitted to serve warrants issued by the governor, the MADOC commissioner or by the MPB chairman. MPB SSPOs may also execute warrants issued by Massachusetts courts. MPB SSPOs may also arrest parolees that have violated their parole conditions or have committed a crime before the parole officer, and have full police powers when assisting a "regular" police officer. Probation officers of the Massachusetts Probation Service are, unlike parole officers, not sworn as SSPOs. Instead, Massachusetts General Law specifically empowers them as "regular" police officers whom may exercise such authority throughout the commonwealth, and are required to attend a Probation Service academy.

There were e also a plethora of "special police officers" who worked in the city of Boston; these officers either work directly for the city (Boston School Police, (Note: As of 2021, with the passage of the Massachusetts Police Reform Act, the Boston School Police has been eliminated. In its place, Boston Public Schools stood-up the Office of Safety Services (OSS), a purely security guard-centric force. It is unclear if the OSS will pursue City of Boston special police officer commissions for any OSS personnel under the new requirements set-forth by the aforementioned Police Reform Act.) Boston Municipal Protective Services, Boston Public Health Commission Police, Boston Housing Authority Police, or Boston Fire Department arson investigators) or for private security and armored car companies. The city of Boston required these agencies to attend a Boston Police Department-approved academy which was a minimum of 160 training hours. However, as of 1 July 2021, most Boston special police officers were stripped of their police powers and the automatic right to carry a firearm on-duty, due to the passage of Massachusetts bill S.2963. The bill requires anyone exercising police powers, including Boston special police officers, to have graduated from an MPTC-approved academy or the MSP-sponsored SSPO Academy; The city of Boston is still permitted to issue special police officer licenses, but prospective officers must meet the aforementioned requirements. As of September 2021, only 6 licenses had been re-issued, all to Boston Housing Authority special police officers.

Special police officers and SSPOs whom work for a "public agency", (i.e. any state or municipal agency, school, or hospital) and are authorized to carry firearms on-duty, qualify to carry a firearm concealed, off-duty, anywhere in the United States, as per the Law Enforcement Officers Safety Act. This act does not grant any additional police authority to individuals that fall under it. Individuals employed by private agencies, i.e. security companies, private schools, or private hospitals, do not qualify for LEOSA protections, even if they are sworn SSPOs whom are authorized to carry a firearm on-duty.

=== New Jersey ===
In New Jersey, the term special police generally refers to Special Law Enforcement Officers (SLEOs) appointed pursuant to the Special Law Enforcement Officers' Act, N.J.S.A. 40A:14-146.8 et seq. SLEOs are law enforcement officers appointed by municipalities and other authorized local units to supplement their regular police forces and perform duties authorized by state law and the employing agency. New Jersey recognizes three classifications of SLEOs: "Class One", "Class Two", and "Class Three".

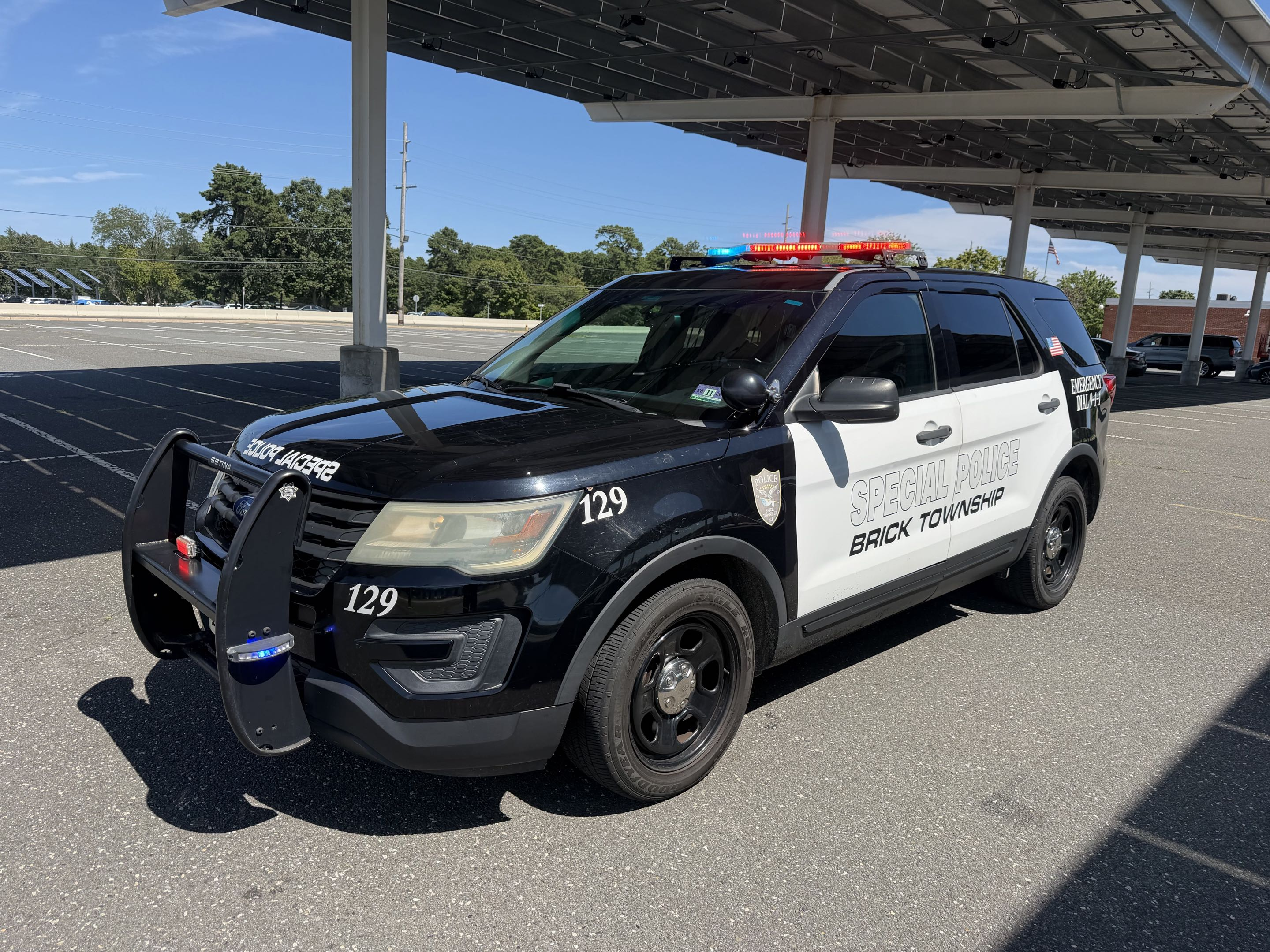
A marked Brick Township Special Police Ford Police Interceptor Utility equipped with emergency lighting.

Special law enforcement officers are subject to training and certification requirements established by the New Jersey Police Training Commission (PTC). A person generally may not begin serving as an SLEO until successfully completing a PTC-approved training course or receiving an authorized exemption based upon substantially equivalent prior police training. Upon completion of the applicable training requirements, the PTC issues a certificate identifying the officer's classification.

Municipalities are not required to employ SLEOs and may utilize some, all, or none of the available classifications depending on local staffing needs, operational priorities, and available funding. The number and classifications of SLEOs employed therefore vary by department.

Class One Special Law Enforcement Officers (SLEO I)

- Class One officers are limited-duty law enforcement officers prohibited from carrying firearms (and are prohibited by law from being assigned duties that would require the carrying or use of one), though they may carry less-lethal equipment such as expandable batons or OC spray. State law expressly authorizes them to perform routine traffic details, spectator control, and similar duties.
- When authorized by ordinance or resolution of the employing local unit, Class One officers may issue summonses for disorderly persons and petty disorderly persons offenses, violations of municipal ordinances, and motor vehicle violations under Title 39 of the New Jersey Revised Statutes. They may also detain persons and use force, including deadly force, when legally justified, although in practice, more serious incidents, arrests, and investigations are generally handled by a Class Two or regularly appointed (full-time) police officer. Class One officers may exercise their police authority only while on duty and ordinarily only within the jurisdiction of the employing local unit, except where otherwise authorized by law, such as during fresh pursuit or pursuant to a mutual aid agreement.
- Class One officers may perform a variety of supplemental police duties, including foot, bicycle, boardwalk, or beach patrols; responding to calls for service; booking arrestees; providing security at municipal courts, buildings, parks, and community events; enforcing traffic laws, municipal ordinances, and disorderly persons offenses; and assisting regular officers.
- Class One officers may be utilized by municipalities throughout New Jersey, but are especially common in shore communities experiencing seasonal increases in population or demand for police services, including the Ocean County municipalities of Seaside Heights, Point Pleasant Beach, and Brick Township.
- Class One positions also commonly serve as an entry point into the law enforcement profession, with some departments specifically recruiting individuals seeking to begin a police career or gain experience before advancing to Class Two or full-time police positions; however, Class One service is not generally a prerequisite for either.

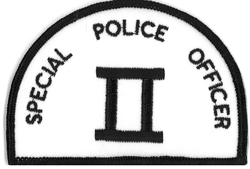
Class II SLEO patch, worn on the right shoulder of the uniform.

Class Two Special Law Enforcement Officers (SLEO II)

- Class Two officers are authorized to exercise full powers and duties similar to those of permanent, regularly appointed full-time police officers, including making arrests, conducting traffic stops, enforcing criminal and motor vehicle laws, conducting investigations, and using force when legally justified. They may carry firearms after successfully completing the training and firearms qualification requirements prescribed by the New Jersey Police Training Commission.
- Class Two officers, like Class One officers, may exercise their police authority only while on duty and ordinarily only within the jurisdiction of the employing local unit, except where otherwise authorized by law, such as during fresh pursuit or pursuant to a mutual aid agreement.
- Class Two officers are commonly used to supplement regular police forces, particularly in shore and resort communities experiencing seasonal increases in population or demand for police services, and such positions may also serve as an entry point into full-service policing, with some officers gaining experience as SLEO IIs before later receiving permanent full-time police appointments.

Class Three Special Law Enforcement Officers (SLEO III)

- Class Three officers are retired law enforcement officers appointed on a part-time basis to provide armed police security at public or private schools and county colleges. They possess powers and duties similar to regular full-time police officers while performing those duties on school or college property while the institution is in session or occupied. While on duty within their employing jurisdiction, they may also respond to an offense or emergency occurring in their presence while traveling to a school or college facility, but may not otherwise be dispatched to off-campus assignments.
- Unlike Class One and Class Two positions, Class Three service is reserved for experienced retired officers rather than those beginning a law enforcement career. Applicants generally must be under 65, have previously served as a fully trained full-time law enforcement officer and separated in good standing, remain physically capable of serving, possess qualifying police training certification, and complete the State's safe schools resource officer training course.
- Class Three officers are intended to supplement, rather than replace, existing law enforcement personnel. State law prohibits their use to replace or reduce the number of full-time regular police officers, and they may not supplant an existing school resource officer or safe schools resource officer. Assignments to extracurricular or after-school functions must first be made available to eligible full-time officers.

=== New Orleans, Louisiana ===
The Superintendent of the New Orleans Police Department in accordance with New Orleans Home Rule Charter section 4-502 (2) (a) (b) and New Orleans Municipal Code 17271 MCS 90–86, may deputize private Security Guards, within the city limits, with limited Police Power as New Orleans Police Special Officers. Louisiana R.S. 40:1379.1 (b) states the Special Officer, when performing those tasks requiring a Special Officer's commission, shall have the same powers and duties as a Peace Officer, however, that when not performing these tasks directly related to the special officer's commission, he shall be regarded as a private citizen and his commission shall not be in effect. Special Officers may make arrest for felony or misdemeanor offenses on the property or area they are to protect, patrol, or in relation to their direct assignment. However, Special Officers still may make an arrest, as a private person, for a felony, whether in or out of his presence, under Louisiana Law CCRP Art.214 Arrest by private person; when lawful.

=== North Carolina ===
In North Carolina, some private companies have their own special police forces. These include hospitals, hotels, race tracks, and shopping malls and are more properly referred to as "Company Police". There are also companies that offer contract special police services for a fee to anyone who has property they wish to protect. In the state of North Carolina, special police differ greatly from security companies. North Carolina Special police officers have full arrest powers on any property they are hired to protect within the state as granted by the North Carolina Attorney General. Special police officers must also attend and pass the Basic Law Enforcement Training program like all other police officers. Security officers do not have arrest powers as their job is to mainly observe and report.

=== Oregon ===
Historically, Oregon had many more special police officers than the state does presently, beginning in the 19th century. While the roles they served have largely been replaced by more conventional law enforcement officers, some special police officers and the authorities for commissioning them remain. For instance, under Oregon law, mayors or similar officials who oversee a municipal water supply system are permitted to appoint special police officers which possess police powers for the purposes of maintaining the purity of drinking water. The regional government Metro appoints special police for the purposes of enforcing parking laws and codes. The city of Portland also commissions special police officers for this purpose.

=== Smithsonian Museum Special Police in NY, Virginia, & DC ===
The Smithsonian museum utilizes federal employees designated as "special police" under the United States Code (Title 10, Chapter 63, §6306). These officers patrol Smithsonian property in New York, Virginia, and the District of Columbia. Smithsonian Special Police Officers carry firearms, mace and handcuffs and have arrest authority on federal Smithsonian property.

=== Tennessee ===
Tennessee code annotated 3-18-118 & T.C.A. 4-3-1106 defines the laws of the commissioning of special police officers/deputies in the state of Tennessee. Tennessee requires all special police officers to hold an active armed security license and possess equivalent military or civilian law enforcement training. These officers traditionally work for private companies as company police or in hospitals or private universities and their jurisdiction is limited to the property to which they are employed. While on duty these officers have full arrest powers and are able to act in law enforcement capacity.

The Department of Safety and Homeland Security maintains a unit of special police officers known as Facility Protection Officers who were created by the Tennessee General Assembly in T.C.A. 4-3-2019. These F.PO.s are managed by the Protective Services Division of the Tennessee Highway Patrol's Facility Protection Unit and provide police services to state facilities. F.P.O.s are granted the authority to make arrests for public offenses committed against state officials or employees or committed upon, about, or against property owned or leased by the state or on public roads or rights-of-way passing through such owned or leased property.

=== Texas ===
The Texas Special Police were formed along with the Texas State Police during the administration of Texas Governor Edmund J. Davis on July 22, 1870, to combat crime statewide in Texas. There were thirty special policemen assigned as auxiliary officers throughout the state. On April 22, 1873, the law authorizing the state police was repealed by the newly elected Democratic-controlled state legislature.

Texas state law authorizes mayors to appoint special police officers to enforce the municipality's laws, avert danger, or protect life or property; because of riot, outbreak, calamity, or public disturbance; or because of threat of serious violation of law or order, of outbreak, or of other danger to the municipality or its inhabitants.

Municipal special police officers are distinct and separate from municipal Marshals and their deputies, as special police derive their authority from the office of the mayor, while Marshals and their deputies derive their authority from the municipal council, and are generally permitted to perform a wider scope of duties such as issuing and executing warrants for arrest.

=== Virginia ===
Virginia possesses special police officers employed, typically, in the private police field. These officers are regulated by the Virginia Department of Criminal Justice Services and are termed special conservators of the peace (SCOP). These officers must meet specific training requirements and be sworn in by the district court judge or magistrate in the area where they request a commission. These officers, when so sworn and certified, are permitted to utilize the term "police" (this was removed by the state legislature in 2018 and they may no longer use the term) and are permitted to operate emergency vehicles equipped with red flashing/strobing lights (municipal law enforcement operates either blue or combinations of blue and red).

This class of officers should not be confused with armed security officers who in Virginia possess arrest authority on the property they are employed to protect. Armed security officers do not have fresh pursuit authority (off of their grounds/property) whereas SCOP officers do.

=== Washington, D.C. ===
Washington utilizes special police in both the public and private security sectors. Most work for private security companies although many security officers in the Washington, D.C., area also have special police status. Special police are required to be licensed and are appointed by the Mayor.

== Vietnam ==
The Ministry of Public Security has a High Command of Mobile Police Force. It includes six regiments of mobile police and three battalions of special police.

== See also ==
- Auxiliary police
- Constable
- Marshal
- Security police
- Special constable
- Special constabulary
- Specialist law enforcement agency
