= Fred Wyshak =

American federal prosecutor

Fred M. Wyshak Jr. (born November 22, 1952) is an American retired federal prosecutor who served as an Assistant United States Attorney in the District of Massachusetts for over three decades. Wyshak became one of the most prominent organized crime prosecutors in the United States, leading efforts that dismantled the Winter Hill Gang and exposed systemic corruption within the Federal Bureau of Investigation's Boston field office. He is best known for his role in the prosecution of James "Whitey" Bulger, the notorious Boston crime boss who evaded capture for sixteen years after Wyshak's 1995 racketeering indictment, before ultimately being convicted of racketeering and murder in 2013. Wyshak also successfully prosecuted Bulger's associates Stephen "The Rifleman" Flemmi and Francis "Cadillac Frank" Salemme, as well as corrupt FBI agent John Connolly. Later in his career, Wyshak served as chief of the Public Corruption and Special Prosecutions Unit and led the landmark prosecution of Insys Therapeutics, securing the first convictions of top pharmaceutical executives for crimes related to the opioid crisis. He retired from the U.S. Attorney's Office in February 2021.

== Early life and education ==
Wyshak was born in 1952. He attended New York University for his undergraduate degree and St. John's University for law school graduating in 1978. He began his career as an Assistant District Attorney in New York City. After serving as an Assistant United States Attorney in New Jersey, he transitioned to Boston in 1989, where he would work until his retirement in 2021.

== Career ==
Wyshak's 32 years in the Massachusetts U.S. Attorney's Office were divided between mobster-related cases (most notably Bulger) during the first portion of his career and then public corruption related cases during the second portion.

=== Winter Hill Gang ===
When Wyshak began working at the Office, the Boston Organized Crime Task Force had recently struck a significant victory against La Cosa Nostra in Boston and Rhode Island by recording a mafia initiation ceremony. Over 20 members were arrested. However, the Office had not made nearly as much progress prosecuting the Boston Irish Mafia, led by Bulger and his Winter Hill Gang. This was due in large part to corruption within the Boston FBI, in particular FBI agent John Connolly's close relationship with Bulger. Wyshak placed a significant focus on the Winter Hill Gang and spent six years investigating and prosecuting various members and associates of that organization, which ultimately culminated in indictments of Bulger, Flemmi, and Salemme in 1995. Bulger fled, Salemme accepted a plea deal in exchange for cooperation, and Flemmi was eventually sentenced to life in prison.

=== John Connolly prosecution ===
In 2005, Connolly was indicted in Florida for the 1980s murders of John B. Callahan and Roger Wheeler by Bulger associates. Connolly stood trial in 2008 in state court in Miami, Florida. Connolly was prosecuted in part by Wyshak. This unusual arrangement required Wyshak to be cross designated as a states attorney for Florida. Callahan was actually murdered by John Martorano, who left the corpse in the trunk of a Cadillac in a Miami International Airport parking lot, but the jury found it was done based on information provided by Connolly. Connelly was convicted and sentenced to 40 years in prison.

=== Whitey Bulger prosecution ===
Bulger was found in 2011 and prosecuted in 2013 by Wyshak, AUSA Brian Kelly, and AUSA Zachery Hafer. He received a life sentence. Boston Globe reporter Dick Lehr, who chronicled much of this entire saga in his book Black Mass, stated regarding Wyshak, "He has steamrolled organized crime, the Italian and the Irish mob - with help, but he was the centrifugal force. Who knows if not for him what it would look like today, the landscape." Wyshak reported that at times he had to have police protection due to threats on his life.

=== Public corruption prosecutions ===
Wyshak focused in later years on public corruption in Boston. He prosecuted cases arising out of the Big Dig construction project. He prosecuted the wife of Congressman John Tierney as part of a larger prosecution related to offshore gambling. He led the prosecution of John O'Brien who was Commissioner of the Massachusetts Probation Service for corruption related to hiring employees. The First Circuit overturned the convictions. Finally, Wyshak led the prosecution of Insys Therapeutics' executives for racketeering conspiracy for bribing doctors to prescribe opioids either at unnecessarily high dosages or to patients that did not need it.

When Wyshak retired, he told the Boston Globe, "I'm so sick of being a lawyer. I have no desire to practice law, and I could never be a defense attorney. I want to enjoy life. I'm going to sit on the beach and drink martinis."

== Popular culture ==
Wyshak is portrayed in the 2015 major motion picture Black Mass, in which he is played by Corey Stoll.
