= John Connolly (FBI agent) =

American FBI agent and convicted felon (born 1940)

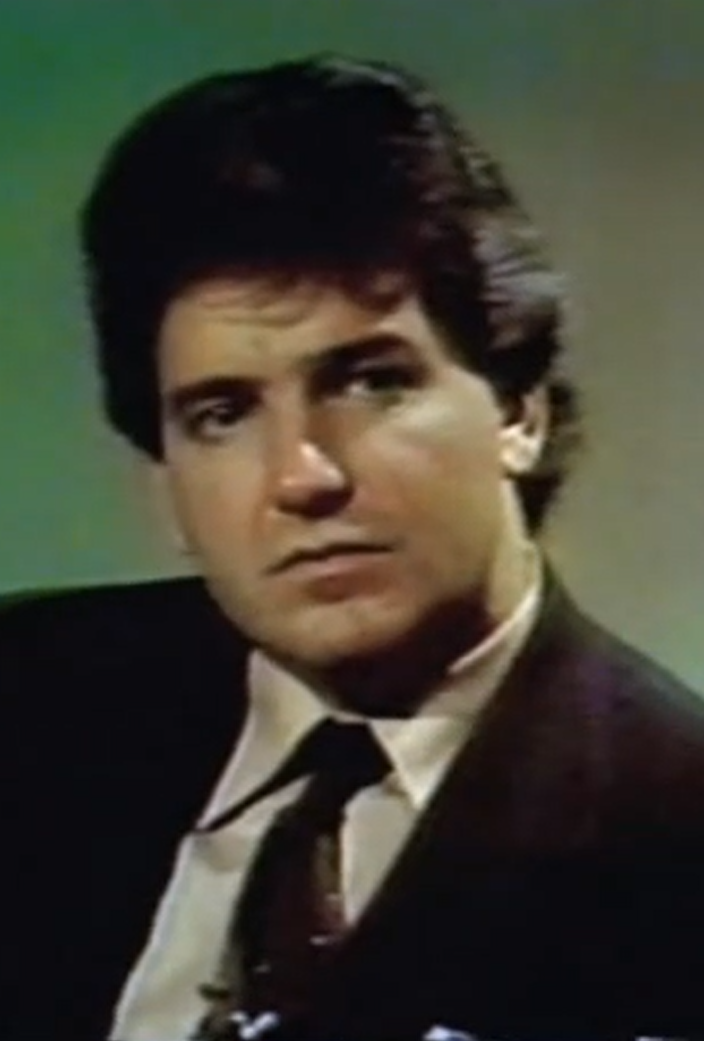
- Connolly in 1983
- Born: John Joseph Connolly Jr. August 1, 1940 (age 86); Boston, Massachusetts, U.S.
- Occupations: Former FBI agent, former private security
- Spouses: Marianne Lockary (m. 1970; div. 1982) Elizabeth L. Moore (m. 1988)
- Children: 3 (with Moore)
- Status: Paroled in February 2021 on medical grounds
- Convictions: Federal: 2002; State: November 6, 2008
- Criminal charges: Federal: racketeering State: second-degree murder
- Penalty: Federal: 10 years in prison State: 40 years in prison

John Joseph Connolly Jr. (born August 1, 1940) is an American former Federal Bureau of Investigation (FBI) agent who was convicted of racketeering, obstruction of justice and murder charges stemming from his relationship with Boston mobsters James "Whitey" Bulger, Steve Flemmi and the Winter Hill Gang.

State and federal authorities had been trying to imprison Bulger for years, but he evaded capture until 2011. As the FBI handler for Bulger and Flemmi, Connolly (who was previously neighbors with Bulger's family in the Old Harbor Housing Project) had been protecting them from prosecution by supplying Bulger with information about possible attempts to catch them. Connolly was indicted on December 22, 1999, on charges of alerting Bulger and Flemmi to investigations, falsifying FBI reports to cover their crimes and accepting bribes.

In 2000, Connolly was charged with additional racketeering-related offenses. He was convicted in 2002 and sentenced to ten years in federal prison. In 2008, he was convicted on state charges of second-degree murder in Florida and sentenced to forty years in prison. He was released from federal prison on June 28, 2011, and transferred to the Florida State Prison to serve the remainder of his sentence for his 2008 conviction.

In April 2020, Connolly asked to be allowed to serve the remainder of his sentence on home confinement due to fears of contracting COVID-19, citing a 2018 federal law allowing for compassionate release under "extraordinary" circumstances, such as age, health and other critical factors. A Florida judge initially declined to order his release, but Connolly was later granted a medical release on February 17, 2021.

== Early life ==
John Joseph Connolly Jr. is the namesake and son of an Irish immigrant, John Connolly Sr. of Maigh Cuilinn in County Galway, a Gillette employee for fifty years. His mother, Bridget T. Connolly (née Kelly), was a housewife. The Connolly family lived in the Old Harbor Housing Project in Boston, Massachusetts, the first public housing project in New England, until John Jr. was twelve years old. The Bulger family, residing a few doors down, had lived in the project since its New Deal creation in 1938; other residents included future U.S. Representative Joseph Moakley, and Francis "Buddy" Leonard, who would later be allegedly murdered by Bulger in 1975 during his violent takeover of Boston's underworld.

Connolly admired his neighbor William "Billy" Bulger, six years his senior; he did not meet Billy's older brother, James "Whitey" Bulger, until he was eight years old. The nineteen-year-old Whitey, who was already notorious as the leader of the Mercer Street gang, bought the other neighborhood boys ice cream and convinced an awestruck Connolly to accept the treat. Later that same year, Connolly found himself outnumbered in a skirmish over a ball with some older boys. According to Connolly, Bulger came along and chased the bullies away.

In 1952, Connolly's family moved to the City Point neighborhood of South Boston. John Jr. was able to attend Columbus High School, a Catholic high school in the Italian North End neighborhood. His younger brother, James, who also later sought a career in law enforcement, joined the Drug Enforcement Administration's New England Division based in Boston.

== Education ==
Connolly attended Boston College with the encouragement of Billy Bulger, and after graduation took classes at Suffolk University Law School. He later earned a graduate degree in Public Administration from Harvard University's John F. Kennedy School of Government. After completing his studies, Connolly worked as a teacher at South Boston High School and at Dorchester High School.

Acting again on the advice of Billy Bulger, by now a member of the Massachusetts House of Representatives, Connolly sought out career opportunities in law enforcement. In 1968 he met with H. Paul Rico's FBI partner, Special Agent Dennis Condon, and Boston Police Department Detective Edward Walsh, an old friend of the Connolly family. Both Condon and Walsh would later brag that they had "recruited" Connolly. Ironically, Condon, who was Connolly's FBI supervisor, had approached Whitey Bulger in the early 1970s, with little result. Because of their neighborhood ties, Connolly would prove to have the inside track with Bulger that Condon did not.

== FBI career ==
On August 1, 1968, U.S. House Speaker John W. McCormack wrote a personal note to J. Edgar Hoover on behalf of a constituent. The letter began, "Dear Edgar, It has come to my attention that the son of a lifelong personal friend has applied to become a special agent of the Federal Bureau of Investigation ..." Connolly was appointed to the FBI in October 1968. FBI Supervisor John M. Morris, who would also later face charges of corruption, was Connolly's supervisor during much of Connolly's time working for the FBI.

Connolly began his FBI career in the Baltimore and San Francisco field offices before being transferred to New York City. He wanted to return to Boston to be closer to his ailing father. A year after he arrested Mafioso Frank Salemme, the FBI transferred Connolly to its Boston field office in the John F. Kennedy Federal Building in 1973.

In 1980, he moved to Thomas Park in the Dorchester Heights neighborhood, across the street from South Boston High School. During his career in the FBI, Connolly investigated organized crime. He was one of the primary agents involved in developing the Top Echelon Criminal Informants Program in New England. Over the span of his career he received eight commendations from every Director of the Federal Bureau of Investigation, from J. Edgar Hoover through L. Patrick Gray, William Ruckelshaus, Clarence M. Kelley, James B. Adams, William H. Webster, John Otto, and William S. Sessions. Through his second marriage, he was the brother-in-law of Arthur Gianelli, a racketeer who was later indicted with Joe "Joey Y" Yerardi, who oversaw Johnny Martorano's criminal operations when Martorano was a federal fugitive in Florida between 1978 and 1995.

In 1989, the DEA was probing the Winter Hill Gang for suspected drug trafficking. The DEA was aware that a former roommate and John's brother James both worked for the DEA. As an FBI supervisor later noted in a memo, the head of the DEA's Boston office "quietly changed the duties of both these DEA special agents so they would not become aware of this matter."

Boston FBI Special Agent Robert Fitzpatrick said:

Connolly just became a force unto himself, a vortex in a constantly changing system. He stayed put as new agents in charge came and went. And he could take care of other agents. He became the guy who could get you sports tickets. He could help you get a day off through the secretaries. He made no secret that he could help you get a job after retirement through Billy Bulger. But he wasn't that much of an agent. He couldn't write a report. He was no administrator. He was just this brassy bullshit artist. We enabled him to some extent. No one had the stomach for examining what he was up to. We just never came to grips with that guy.

Connolly's dapper, even flashy, appearance meant he stood out as an FBI agent. Bulger poked fun at his foppishness; referring to Connolly as "Elvis" because of his perfectly combed hair.

Before he was brought up on criminal charges, Connolly was mentioned in Gerard O'Neill and Dick Lehr's true crime book, The Underboss: The Rise & Fall of a Mafia Family (1989), which followed the FBI's campaign against Gennaro Angiulo with Connolly, John Morris, and a team of fellow FBI agents.

=== Meeting Flemmi and Bulger ===
Connolly first met with FBI informants Stephen Flemmi and Whitey Bulger at a coffee shop in Newton, Massachusetts. Louis Litif, one of the top bookmakers and a Winter Hill Gang mob associate, was one of Connolly's handball partners at the Boston Athletic Club. Bulger nicknamed Connolly "Zip" because the lawman shared the same South Boston ZIP Code as the Bulger clan.

He occasionally lectured FBI agents at the FBI Academy in Quantico, Virginia on informant development tactics and techniques, and was a member of the Boston FBI's Organized Crime Squad. Retired FBI Special Agent Joseph D. Pistone wrote in the book, The Ceremony, "The reign of the Patriarca Family is virtually ended. A substantial amount of the credit for the demise of that mob Family must be given to one man, Special Agent John Connolly." Connolly retired from the FBI honorably in 1990 and accepted the position of Director of Security/Public affairs for Boston Edison, from former Boston FBI Special Agent John Kehoe. Even after his retirement, Connolly remained in contact with his former colleagues on the Organized Crime squad in the Boston office of the FBI.

Prior to his retirement, Connolly disseminated a memo falsely stating that Bulger and Flemmi had retired from organized crime and gone into legitimate business.

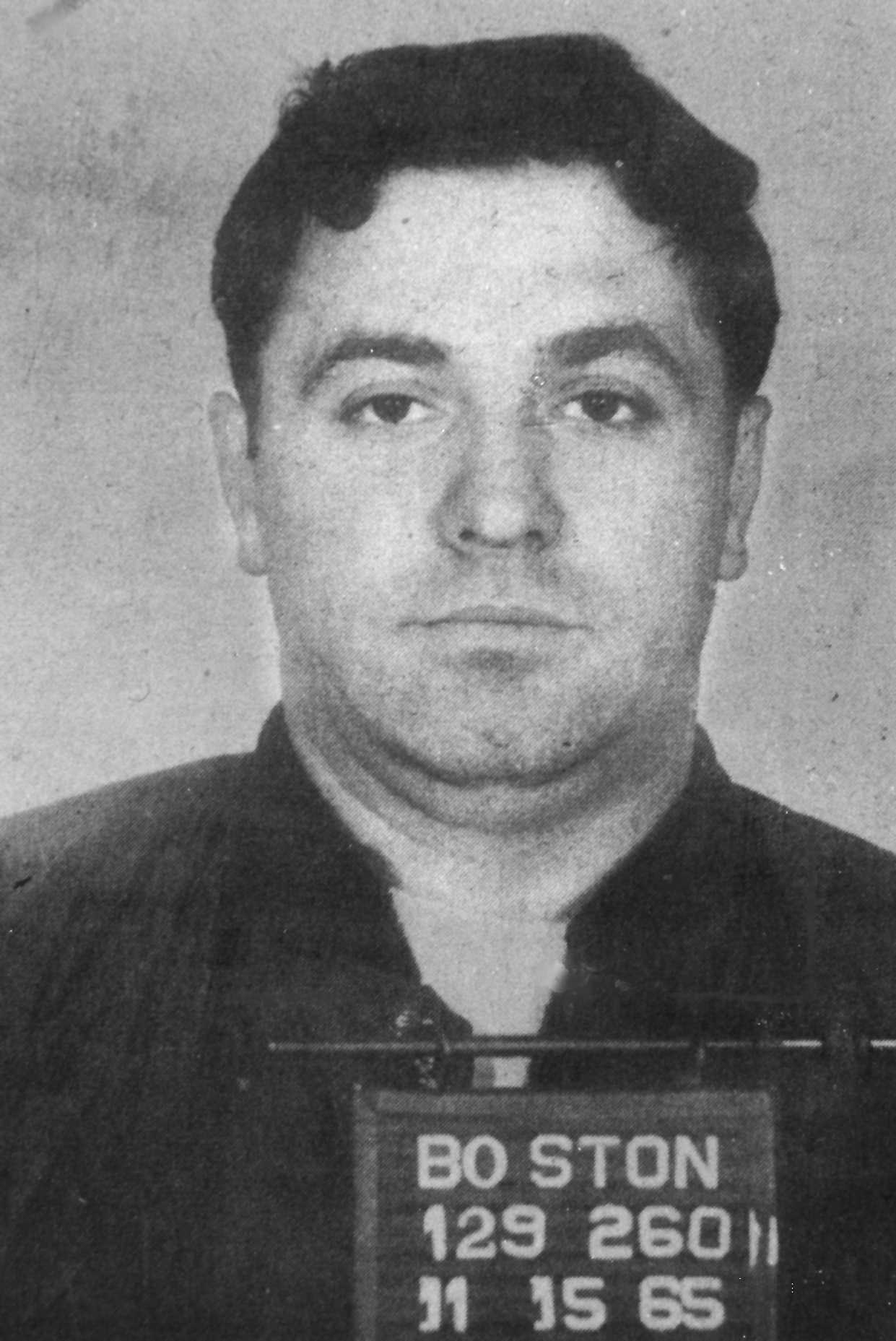
Stephen Flemmi

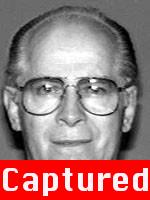
Whitey Bulger

== Murder trial, conviction, and sentencing ==
In 2005, Connolly was indicted on murder and conspiracy to commit murder charges in the 1982 slaying of John B. Callahan and the 1981 murder of Roger Wheeler, owner of the World Jai Alai sporting corporation. Connolly stood trial in 2008 in state court in Miami, Florida. Connolly was prosecuted in part by Boston Assistant United States Attorney Fred Wyshak, the attorney who investigated and ultimately prosecuted Bulger. This unusual arrangement required Wyshak to be cross designated as a states attorney for Florida. Callahan was murdered by John Martorano, who left the corpse in the trunk of a Cadillac in a Miami International Airport parking lot.

Prosecutors alleged that Callahan was killed on the orders of Whitey Bulger and Stephen Flemmi, after Connolly told them that the FBI was investigating Callahan's ties to the Winter Hill Gang in their ongoing investigation into Wheeler's death. Martorano had killed Wheeler in Tulsa, Oklahoma, in May 1981.

During the trial, Bulger associates Flemmi, Martorano, and Kevin Weeks testified for the prosecution detailing Connolly's ties to Bulger and Flemmi. Flemmi testified that he and Bulger paid Connolly $235,000 over the years, but started cutting his payments in the late 1980s after he started attracting attention through too many luxury purchases, including a boat. IRS special agent Sandra Lemansky testified that during the 1980s Connolly bought a 27-foot Sea Ray for $46,567; a South Boston condo for $63,000, with a $12,000 down payment; a Brewster condo for $80,000, with a $15,000 down payment; land in Chatham for $98,000; and then built a house on the Chatham property for $132,000. During the 1980s, Connolly's annual FBI salary started at $45,000 and gradually increased to $65,000, she said. Denise Taiste, an FBI employee who worked as an assistant to Connolly in 1988 testified that on one occasion when he was not in the office, Connolly instructed her to leave his paycheck in his desk. Taiste admitted that she looked at the check, which was for $2,078.61, then opened the middle drawer of his desk and saw about 10 more uncashed checks inside.

Bulger's former girlfriend, Theresa Stanley, testified for the defense about her travels with Bulger. Flemmi testified that Connolly warned them that the FBI wanted to question Callahan in the death of Wheeler, and that Callahan "wouldn't hold up" and would probably implicate them. Also testifying against Connolly was his former FBI superior, John Morris, who admitted that he had accepted $7,000 in bribes from Bulger and Flemmi. Morris stated that he began leaking information to them after Connolly delivered a case of wine and an envelope stuffed with $1,000 cash from the pair.

Former U.S. Attorney and U.S. District Senior Judge Edward F. Harrington testified for the defense, stating that Connolly was a star agent who was credited with using informants to help weaken the New England Mafia.

On November 6, 2008, a jury convicted Connolly of second-degree murder. According to the prosecutors, Connolly faced a possible sentence of 30 years to life in prison. Sentencing was postponed until January 2009, while Circuit Judge Stanford Blake considered a motion by the defense to dismiss the case. The defense argued that in Florida, when Connolly was convicted, the statute of limitations had expired for second-degree murder.

On January 15, 2009, Judge Blake sentenced Connolly to 40 years in prison, saying that Connolly "crossed over to the dark side." The judge agreed with the defense's argument involving the statute of limitations but noted that their motion was past the deadline for such motions. The judge accepted the prosecutors' argument that Connolly abused his badge and deserved more than the 30-year minimum. The 40-year state sentence runs consecutively with the 10-year federal sentence.

Connolly served his time in FCI Butner Low facility at the Federal Correctional Complex, Butner, North Carolina. He was released from federal custody on June 28, 2011, and was transferred to a Florida state prison to serve his 40-year state sentence. Connolly has stated that he had nothing to do with the Callahan murder. With Bulger's capture on June 24, 2011, Connolly's attorney said his client would appeal if Bulger corroborated Connolly's claim of innocence.

On May 28, 2014, Connolly's murder conviction was overturned by a panel of Florida's Third District Court of Appeal by a vote of 2–1. The panel held that since Connolly did not "carry or discharge the gun that was used to kill John Callahan in South Florida", it was not appropriate to convict him of murder. On July 29, 2015, the full court en banc reinstated Connolly's murder conviction by a vote of 6–4, finding that the conviction was legally proper, even though he was on Cape Cod when Martorano killed Callahan. Judge Leslie B. Rothenberg, who had been the lone vote for conviction in the earlier hearing, wrote, "It now no longer matters whether the defendant hired (procured) a hit man, turned to his mob friends to murder Callahan, served as a lookout, provided the gun, or pulled the trigger himself, he is a principal in the first degree." Under Florida sentencing guidelines, Connolly was required to serve at least one-third of his sentence before becoming eligible for parole.

Connolly was paroled from prison in Florida in 2021 without objection from Callahan's widow after prison officials learned he was gravely ill with melanoma and diabetes and possibly had only another year to live. He returned to Massachusetts, but will remain under supervision until 2047. Despite his convictions, Connolly retained and continues to receive pension benefits, since federal employees only lose their pension if convicted of espionage or treason.

== Personal life ==
Connolly's first wife, Marianne Lockary, was his childhood sweetheart whom he married as he neared graduation from Suffolk University Law School. In January 1982, he and Lockary, who cited an "irretrievable breakdown" of their marriage after a four-year separation, divorced. In 1988, Connolly married Elizabeth L. Moore, a court stenographer who worked at the FBI headquarters at Government Center, Boston.

Connolly had no children with his first wife but fathered three sons with his second wife, Elizabeth. His sister-in-law Mary Ann Moore is married to Arthur Gianelli. Gianelli and Connolly purchased adjoining properties in Lynnfield, Massachusetts. Their adjacent homes were built by Thomas F. Tuffo, the real estate partner of Kevin P. O'Neil, who the FBI claimed was a long-time money launderer and enforcer for Bulger and Flemmi.

== See also ==
- Black Mass
- The Departed
