= Fire police =

Type of police auxiliary with limited police powers

Fire police are fire department members who, based upon their jurisdictional authority, receive sworn police powers, special training, and support firefighting efforts at emergency incidents. In addition to securing firefighting equipment, incident and fire scenes, and the station itself, fire police perform traffic and crowd control. In some jurisdictions, fire police are exterior firefighters and may be called upon at fire scenes to perform any of the duties of an interior firefighter except those that require a self-contained breathing apparatus. On occasion, fire police also assist regular police: they perform road closures, traffic control, crowd control at public events, missing persons searches, parade details, salvage, security, and other miscellaneous tasks as requested.

== Duties ==
Fire police are a fire department resource and answer to the officer in charge (OIC) of the fire brigade in attendance. However, special fire police officers in Pennsylvania, USA, are under the direction of the state or local police. Where no other fire brigade resources are present, fire police will usually assist police under the direction of the police's OIC or, depending on local regulations, act autonomously.

While the exact role of fire police may vary between brigades and between countries, the general themes are constant throughout:

=== Traffic control at emergency scenes ===
Traffic control consists of managing the flow of vehicles around or through the immediate vicinity of an emergency. This may entail road closures, diversions, full 'points' control at intersections, or '1-way-shunts', in which the road is reduced to one lane and its direction is alternated in a controlled fashion.

=== Scene safety ===
Fire police assist in ensuring that the scene of an incident remains safe for firefighters, emergency service workers, and members of the public working in its vicinity.

=== Crowd control and liaison ===
Residents, owners, occupants, relatives, transients, spectators, and the media are among those who may approach the scene of an incident, and fire police prevent them from being harmed or hampering the work of emergency services personnel working at the scene. Since fire police are often the public's first point of contact with the fire department, they must be skilled in public relations.

=== Scene security ===
Fire police may be asked to provide a scene guard in order to prevent looting or theft and monitor unattended fire brigade equipment.

=== Police assistance ===
Fire police are often called upon by police and other law enforcement agencies to provide additional manpower. Many of the tasks listed above also fall within the area of responsibility of the police, but fire police when on the scene may allow the police to concentrate on other more specific areas of expertise.

=== Logistics ===
Fire police may provide a logistics resource - vehicle movements, communications or similar. This would particularly be the case at a scene controlled by the fire brigade but they may be called upon by other services.

== Fire police around the world ==
=== Brazil ===
In Brazil, the Military Firefighters Corps (Portuguese: Corpo de Bombeiros Militar) are military public security forces, responsible for civil defense, firefighting and search and rescue inside the federative units. Since 1915, it has been a military reserve force and an auxiliary force of the Brazilian Army, also composing the Single System of Public Security (Brazilian Portuguese: Sistema Único de Segurança Pública). Members of the Military Firefighters Corps, such as the members of the Military Police, are designated as being part of the military of the Federative Units by the Federal Constitution.

=== China ===
Prior to the 2018 formation of China Fire and Rescue, the People's Armed Police was responsible for wildfire suppression.

=== Cyprus ===
The Cyprus Fire Service previously formed part of the Police.

=== Indonesia ===
In Indonesia, the term "fire police car" refers to two different things depending on the context: operational vehicles of the Indonesian National Police (Polri) modified to help extinguish forest and land fires (Indonesian: Kebakaran Hutan dan Lahan), as well as special electric vehicle variants exhibited at the national automotive market.

=== New Zealand ===
In New Zealand, fire police formerly existed by virtue of Section 33 of the Fire Service Act 1975. The Fire Service Act allowed for the formation of volunteer fire police units (based on the approval of the district chief of police) and bestowed upon them the legal powers of a police constable. Several fire police units existed around New Zealand, some attached to volunteer fire brigades, and others acting as individual units and/or brigades in their own right.

Fire police in New Zealand engaged in all of the above listed roles. In areas where fire police did not exist, operational support members of the fire service carried out the same tasks (using the powers of a firefighter gained through Section 28 of the Fire Service Act). Firefighters (including operational support members) gained all the powers required to conduct their operations through Section 28; fire police wielded both these and the powers of a constable gained through Section 33. Operationally, fire police units and operational support units were generally considered to be equivalent, and were well valued by both the operational firefighters and the New Zealand Police.

==== Future prospects ====
A review of the Fire Service Act was announced in the late 2000s but a change of government placed this on hold. However, in the aftermath of the review of the Policing Act 2008 the NZ Fire Service announced its intention to have Section 33 of the Fire Service Act (allowing for fire police) repealed. With this in mind, fire police units across New Zealand have become operational support units, with a largely unchanged role, but without the powers of police. The powers of a constable are considered unnecessary, as all the functions of fire police were able to be legally carried out under Section 28 of the Act (powers of a chief fire officer) under delegation, except for the power of arrest.

==== Dissolution of Fire Police ====
In 2017, the Fire Services Act 1975 was repealed, and replaced with the Fire And Emergency New Zealand Act 2017. Under this new Act, Fire Police in New Zealand no longer exist in law.

=== India ===
The Central Industrial Security Force (CISF) and Home Guard have fire wings.

=== Japan ===
Firefighting in Japan was primarily the responsibility of the municipal police departments between the Meiji Restoration and the end of World War II.

=== Philippines ===
The Integrated National Police provided firefighting services until its 1991 dissolution, and the creation of the separate Bureau of Fire Protection.

=== Ancient Rome ===
The Vigiles had dual firefighting and policing duties.

=== Taiwan ===
The National Police Agency controlled the fire brigades until their 1995 separation into the National Fire Agency.

=== United Kingdom ===
Prior to the creation of the wartime National Fire Service, some police forces had their own Fire Brigades.

=== United States ===
Fire police exist in thirteen states of the United States including Connecticut, Delaware, Florida, Maryland, Massachusetts, New Jersey, New York, North Carolina, Maine, Ohio, and Pennsylvania. They must take an oath of office and be sworn in by a municipal clerk or official, mayor, magistrate, judge, sheriff or justice of the peace - depending upon jurisdiction and local authorizing laws. At fire service incidents, fire police assume either the full or necessary powers of a police constable.

Some texts list Burlington County, New Jersey as forming one of the first fire police units. Laws in New Jersey State code as early as the 1850s supported fire police in their duties.

==== Connecticut ====
Unlike many other fire police departments, those in Connecticut do not necessarily have police powers or acts as sworn agents of a body of government. Instead, their authority flows directly from the fire chief of their parent fire department; however, this authority relates only to fire drills, emergencies within the fire district, and mutual aid situations. Nevertheless, the mayor or first selectman of some towns may give fire police constable status despite this worldwide custom.

The state of Connecticut requires that fire police officers are officially appointed by the fire chief, and it provides them with, among other things, distinctive badges of office, headgear, reflective equipment.

All Connecticut fire police are certified by the Connecticut Fire Police Association under the standards of the Connecticut Fire Academy, and many fire departments have specialized or modified their apparatus for traffic control. For instance, the Hebron volunteer fire company (Hebron, CT) has Service 310, a modified retired ambulance. Colchester Fire & EMS has Service 328, an old dump truck with flat bed that has been modified specifically for traffic control by equipping it with a crash attenuator unit and cones, signs, etc.

This is spelled out in Connecticut statute under Chapter 104, Section 7-313a.

==== Maine ====
Although Maine fire police are not peace officers and do not have any police powers, they may be sworn in as special police in some towns, albeit rarely. Special police are police officers appointed for one-year terms and given very limited authority by their township to carry out specified duties. For example, under Maine law, only a police officer may actually shut down a roadway, while fire police cannot.

However, in 2005, emergency workers in Maine received the authority to "redirect traffic" at emergency scenes as public safety traffic flaggers (PSTF's). This new authority improved upon the previous custom of fire police doing so by citing the state law that allows them to use reasonable force to protect a fire scene. Moreover, the law requires anyone acting as a PSTF to be properly trained and wear appropriate safety gear. Furthermore, while PSTF duties are generally carried out by fire police, other department members with proper PSTF training may be pressed into duty at busy scenes.

See Maine Revised Statutes, Title 29-A, Chapter 2091 - "Control of vehicular traffic at emergency scenes".

==== New York ====
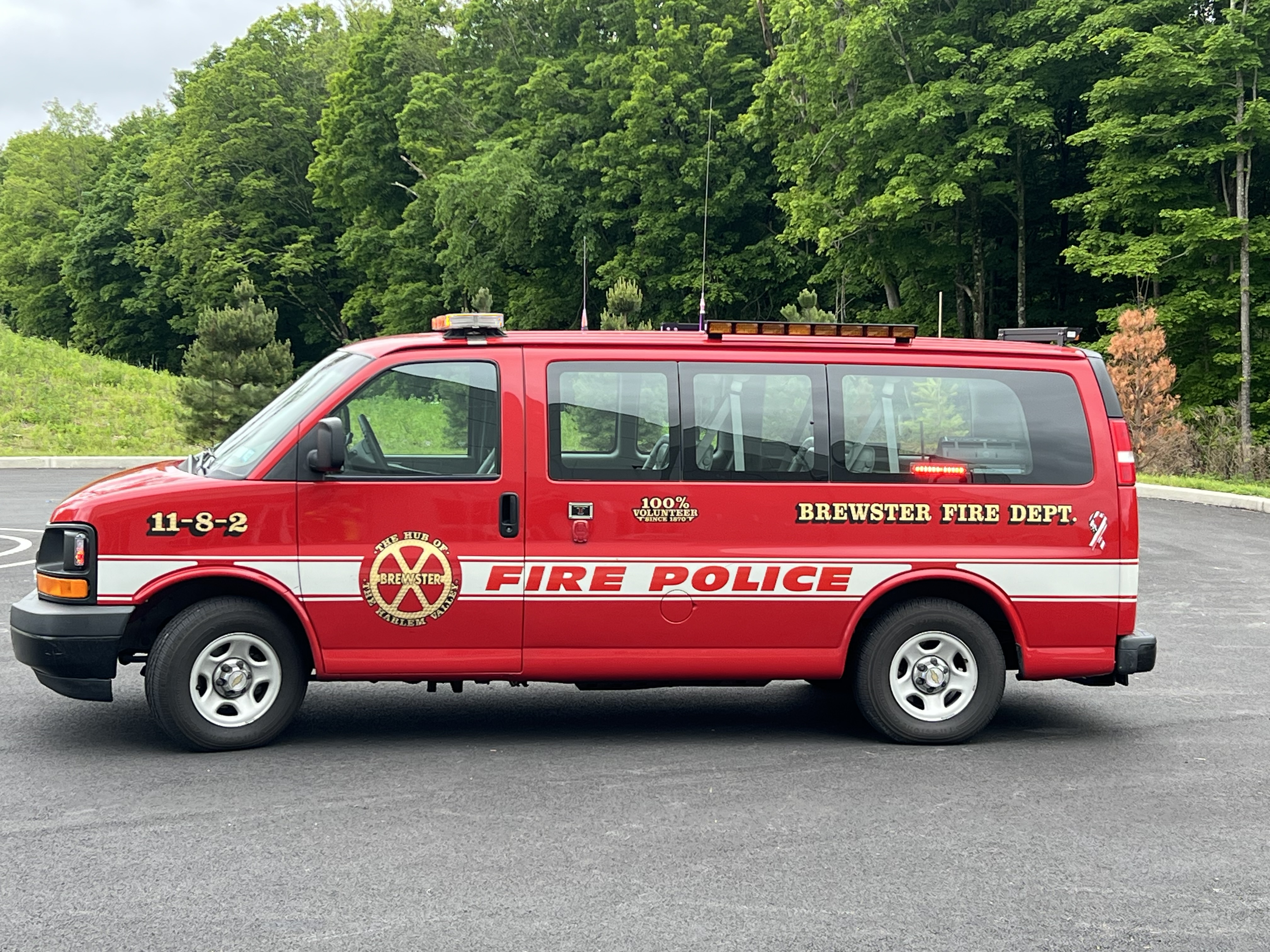
Brewster NY Fire Department 11-8-2 (Fire Police) van.

Under New York State law, Fire Police must complete a Fire Police certification course outlined by the New York State Division of Criminal Justice (NYS DCJS). After which, each fire police member is required to take an oath of office by either the AHJ (Chief/Assistant Chief) of the supporting fire company or the town, county or city clerks office and a copy of which must be kept on file in the town, county, city clerk's office in the municipality in which they serve. The training coordinator must fill out and submit all paperwork concerning the course study and attendance to DCJS for each individual fire company. At that time, each individual person is now registered and certified as a Peace Officer by the State of New York. Fire police in New York State are peace officers as per Article 2.10 Subsection 41 of the states Criminal Procedure Law. When acting pursuant to their special duties and allowed by the fire agency, fire police have the powers of peace officers which are listed in Article 2.20 of the states Criminal Procedure Law. Peace officer status does grant fire police arrest powers however, they may not carry a firearm without additional licensing

These duties are granted under Section 209 (c) of the General Municipal Law. As New York State peace officers, they are required to take an oath, a copy of which must be kept on file in the town clerk's office in the municipality in which they serve. As mandated by Executive Law, Section 845 (Chapter 482, Laws of 1979 and Chapter 843 Laws of 1980), they are also listed with the Central Registry of Police and Peace Officers at the New York State, Division of Criminal Justice Services, Office of Public Safety in Albany, NY.

Their duties are as follows:

- To regulate traffic at emergency scenes. - In order to protect firefighters from outside interference, each New York State fire police detachment regulates traffic at the scene of any emergency to which its respective department has been called until relieved by the arrival of a fire chief or the regular police agency.
- To protect the general public at the scene of a fire. - Residents, owners, occupants, relatives, transients, spectators, and even the news media may hamper firefighting operations; therefore, New York State fire police use tact and courtesy to prevent them from being harmed or obstructing firefighting operations.
- To keep fire areas clear for fire fighting purpose. - New York State fire police provide room for apparatus, emergency vehicles, service vehicles, and firefighters' vehicles to, among other things, park, operate, turn around, perform tanker operations, and lay hose lines for firefighters.
- To protect the equipment of a fire company. - New York State fire police keep all non-firefighters away from (and especially off) department vehicles and equipment in order to prevent damage and looting.
- To enforce the laws of New York State relating to firematic activities and firefighting techniques. - The reckless disregard for safe driving within an emergency area, driving over fire hoses, spectators' disrespect for fire lines, and non-emergency vehicles intrusions, comprise just some of the situations that New York fire police must prevent.
- To cooperate with all regular police agencies. - Owing to their common causes of protection, safety, and order, New York fire police cooperate with regular police agencies.
- To protect the property at the scene of a fire until the chief releases the fire police from duty and turns the responsibility over to other police agencies or to the owner.
- To preserve the crime scene until the proper authority arrives on the scene. - Although New York fire police prevent unauthorized entry into the scene, they remain alert to the fact that bystanders may possess critical information. In addition, they protect the scene's evidence and report unusual events or happenings.
- To carry out the orders of the chief who is in supreme command at all fires and emergencies.

==== North Carolina ====
Uniformed regular and volunteer firemen and uniformed regular and volunteer members of a rescue squad in North Carolina may direct traffic and enforce traffic laws and ordinances at the scene of or in connection with fires, accidents, or other hazards in connection with their duties as firemen or rescue squad members. These members are not, however, considered law enforcement officers.

==== Pennsylvania ====
Fire police in Pennsylvania are volunteer fire company members and are sworn in by the mayor, borough council president, township supervisor, or the local district justice of the peace. While they are usually under the direct control of the local police, they are under the Pennsylvania State Police if no local department is available. The first fire police officers in the Commonwealth of Pennsylvania were appointed in Meadville, Crawford County in 1896 and until the passage of Title 35 in 1941, had no greater authority than that which could be provided by their respective fire company and municipality.

However, the passage of the aforementioned bill granted Pennsylvania's special fire police officers the police power to provide protection. In addition, fire police were legally created to assist their fire department during emergency situations. Moreover, Title 35 was amended in 1949, 1959, and again in 1980 (Act 74, 388, 209, 122) to broaden the scope of authority of the fire police. In 1949, the law was amended (Act 388) to give fire police the power to act without fire company involvement if requested to do so by their municipality. In 1959, (Act 209) the law was again amended to allow fire police to use their police powers in any non-emergency public function conducted by or under the auspices of any volunteer fire company and the requirement of the request of the municipality was later removed from the law.

Furthermore, the provision that allows fire police to use their police power in non-emergency events was later amended to authorize these officers to provide police services for organizations other than volunteer fire companies if requested to do so by their respective municipality. In 1980 (Act 122 - current law), the Fire Police Act was amended to, among other things, make it clear that the act does not (in and of itself) grant fire police officers the right or power to use firearms or other weapons. Conversely, nothing in the law prohibits Pennsylvania Fire Police, with a permit to carry a weapon, from carrying such while performing their duties.

In conclusion, these amendments widened the scope of authority of fire police in Pennsylvania to have limited police powers, and although they have no authority to make arrests, they do have the right to detain someone within reason.

Fire police may control the flow of traffic to ensure emergency vehicles have a quick, safe entrance and egress to an incident. They may halt traffic or detour traffic because of the situation and the dangers involved. They take orders from the police authority in charge.

All fire police officers are sworn officers of the law and when on duty shall display a badge of authority and shall be subject to control of the chief of police of the city, borough, town or township in which they are serving, or if none, of a member of the Pennsylvania state police. Disobeying a fire police officer is the same as disobeying a police officer, sheriff's deputy, state constable or state trooper and assaulting one is a felony.

Current Pennsylvania fire police law is found in Title 35, Chapter 74, subchapters 7431 to 7437.

=== Vietnam ===
In Vietnam, Vietnam Fire and Rescue Police Department (FRPD) is under command of Ministry of Public Security.

=== Germany ===
During the Third Reich the Feuerschutzpolizei (lit. 'Fire Protection Police') was a national firefighter unit formed by former municipal career fire departments and a part of the Ordnungspolizei. Every career firefighter was a police officer. In 1945 the fire departments came under municipal administration again, strictly separated from police jurisdictions.

== See also ==
- Emergency service unit
- Fire marshal
- Women in firefighting
