= Adelaide Hills Tarmac Rally =

Adelaide Hills Tarmac Rally is an annual event held around Willunga, south of Adelaide, South Australia. The event is run under CAMS regulations and is open to a variety of Tarmac vehicles.

2009 Adelaide Hills Tarmac Rally will be its 4th year, and will expand to a full two-day event over at least 17 stages.

Proposed Event Summary for 2009 will be based on 2008.

== Past Events ==
2008 was held on Sunday 29 June over 10 stages with 57 km competitive. A total of 53 vehicles took part including the Lamborghini Gallardo Superleggera of Kevin Weeks and Bec Crunkhorne, and the Ferrari 360 Challenge of Brenton Griguol and Simon Fitzpatrick.

Stages were held the Old Willunga Hill, Wickhams Hill, Hindmarsh Tiers, Tooperang and Yundi Roads - each stage run twice.

=== 2008 Event Summary ===
The event will be held under the International Sporting Code of the FIA, the National Competition Rules of CAMS, the National Rally Code, the 2008 Conditions of Rallying for South Australia, the 2008 SA Rally Championship Series Regulations, 2008 Tarmac Standing Regulations with the approval of ARCom, these Event Supplementary Regulations, Further Regulations and any Bulletins or Instructions to competitors that may be issued.

Where there is any divergence between THE 2008 CAMS MANUAL, the 2008 CAMS TARMAC STANDING REGULATIONS, THE 2008 SA RALLY SERIES REGULATIONS, THE 2008 CONDITIONS OF RALLYING FOR SOUTH AUSTRALIA and these Event Supplementary Regulations, The Event Supplementary Regulations will take precedence.

Will be a Special Stage Rally using A to A timing – as per National Rally Code 1.33.

Will be a Tarmac Rally using A to A timing – as per National Rally Code 1.33.

Is approved to run by CAMS and ARCOM.

The event is for specialized race for the South Australian Tarmac Rally Championship. It also is officially the third round of the broader SA Rally Championship season.

Is open to Classic – Category 1 to 6 as per CAMS Classic Tarmac Rally Technical Regulations and Modern – M1, M2, M3 and M4 as per CAMS Modern Tarmac Technical Regulations, including PRC and Group N Rally Cars

== Previous winners ==
2009 Andrew Burnard / Brian Virgo - Mitsubishi Lancer Evo 8

2008 Steve Glenney / Bernie Webb - Subaru WRX Sti

2007 Nick Streckeinsen / Mike Dale - Mitsubishi Lancer Evo 9

2006 Declan Dwyer / Craig Adams - Mitsubishi Lancer Evo 3
