= John Augustus =

Prison reform campaigner (1785–1859)

John Augustus (c. 1785 – June 21, 1859) was an American boot maker and penal reformer. He is credited with coining the English term "probation" and is called the "Father of Probation" in the United States because of his pioneering efforts to campaign for more lenient sentences for convicted criminals based on their backgrounds.

== Life ==
Augustus was born in Woburn, Massachusetts. His interest in prisoner rehabilitation began in 1841, when he was touched by the case of a man arrested for public intoxication and paid his bail, moving the judge to set the man free. Thus began Augustus' practice of paying peoples' bail. Augustus' success rate could rival - and possibly surpass - the success rate of any rehabilitation program available today. His work brought him the devotion and aid of many Boston philanthropists and organizations. Augustus' success started him on an 18-year run as the first probation officer. At his death, it was noted that of the 1,946 people he helped, only ten proved unworthy (for which he forfeited bail).

Augustus died on June 21, 1859, in Boston, Massachusetts.

== See also ==
- Matthew Davenport Hill
- Alexander Maconochie (penal reformer)
- Massachusetts Probation Service
