= Erica McDermott =

American actress (born 1973)

- Born: Erica Gedziun; 26 April 1973 (age 53); Cambridge, Massachusetts, U.S.
- Other name: E McD
- Occupation: Actress
- Spouse: Bob McDermott
- Website: www.ericamcdermott.com

Erica McDermott (born April 26, 1973) is an American actress, perhaps known best for her supporting role as Cindy "Tar" Eklund, the sister of the lead character, in the David O. Russell film The Fighter (2010).

== Life and career ==
On April 26, 1973, McDermott was born in Cambridge, Massachusetts, United States. While in grade school, she acted in school plays. Having trained as a registered nurse, however, she initially focused on her career in the medical profession and raising her family.

In 2008, McDermott decided to launch her acting career, starting with an appearance in The MOMologues for a school fundraiser. She continued to develop her skills by taking acting classes at the Rock Educational Cooperative and Plymouth Rock Studios, as well as appearing in various Boston stage productions.

In 2009, McDermott began her film career with a supporting role in the film short Mama Raised a Hellraiser (2010). She was soon cast, at the age of 36, as Mark Wahlberg's character's sister in the David O. Russell film The Fighter (2010). McDermott later appeared in two more Russell films, American Hustle (2013) and Joy (2015).

In 2015, McDermott played Benedict Cumberbatch's wife in the critically acclaimed crime drama film Black Mass (2015).

== Filmography ==
=== Film ===
Year	Title	Role	Notes
2010	Knight and Day	Bridesmaid	
2010	Mama Raised a Hellraiser	Saul's Mother	
2010	The Fighter	Cindy "Tar" Eklund	Nominated—MTV Movie Award for Best Fight
2011	The Rude, the Mad, and the Funny	Frederica Robashaw	
2012	Last Hours in Suburbia	Mrs. Daniels	
2012	Irish Whisper	Renee	Short film
2013	American Hustle	Carl Elway's Assistant	
2015	Black Mass	Mary Bulger	
2015	Joy	Parking Lot Woman	
2016	Manchester by the Sea	Sue	
2016	Patriots Day	Jimmy's Girlfriend	
2020	Allagash	Jane	
2021	CODA	Angela	
2022	Confess, Fletch	Detective *3	
2025	Ella McCay	Hugging Woman	

=== Television ===
Year	Title	Role	Notes
2011	Body of Proof	Officer West	Episode: "Buried Secrets"
2019	Castle Rock	Nurse	Episode: "New Jerusalem"
2023	Julia	Shirley Bambach	Episode: "Bûche De Noël"
