= Feuerschutzpolizei =

Fire service in Nazi-run Germany

- Polizeiadler

Operational area
- Country: Nazi Germany
- City fire departments: 86
- Mobile regiments (1939-1943): 5
- Mobile battalions (1943-1945): 9

Agency overview
- Established: 24 October 1939
- Dissolved: 17 July 1945
- Employees: 12,217 (1941) within the Germany of 1937
- Commissioner: SS-Brigadeführer und Generalmajor der Polizei Hans Rumpf

Feuerschutzpolizei (lit. 'Fire Protection Police') was a fire police unit in Nazi Germany and a branch of Nazi Germany's Ordnungspolizei, formed in 1938 when the German municipal professional fire brigades were transferred to the national police. The previously red fire vehicles, blue uniforms and fire service ranks were replaced by green fire vehicles, green uniforms and police ranks.

== Mission ==
The Feuerschutzpolizei had several distinct missions: to extinguish fires; to cooperate in civil defense policy; to carry out prevention missions by ensuring, for example, that building construction uses non-combustible materials; prescribe regulations for the handling and storage of highly flammable materials; and finally, provide a fire inspection service.

== History ==
In Germany, the growing importance of the fire service and civil defence policy led to a reform of the peacetime organization of the firefighting services. Thus, the German law of December 15, 1933, regulating firefighting, placed volunteer, compulsory, and professional firefighters under the administration of the police supervisory authorities (Polizeiaufsichtsbehörden). This gave rise to the concept of a firefighting police force (Feuerlöschpolizei). The law of 1933 was supplemented by a second law dated November 23, 1938, which established the new principles of the fire service. This latter law facilitated the implementation of a rigid and uniform organization for the entire Germany. Alongside the various fire brigade organizations, it created a fire protection police force, the Feuerschutzpolizei, by transferering the professional fire brigades to the police. As a technical police force and an organization of national interest, the Feuerschutzpolizei was placed under the control of the Ministry of the Interior and became a branch of the Ordnungspolizei.

== Organization ==
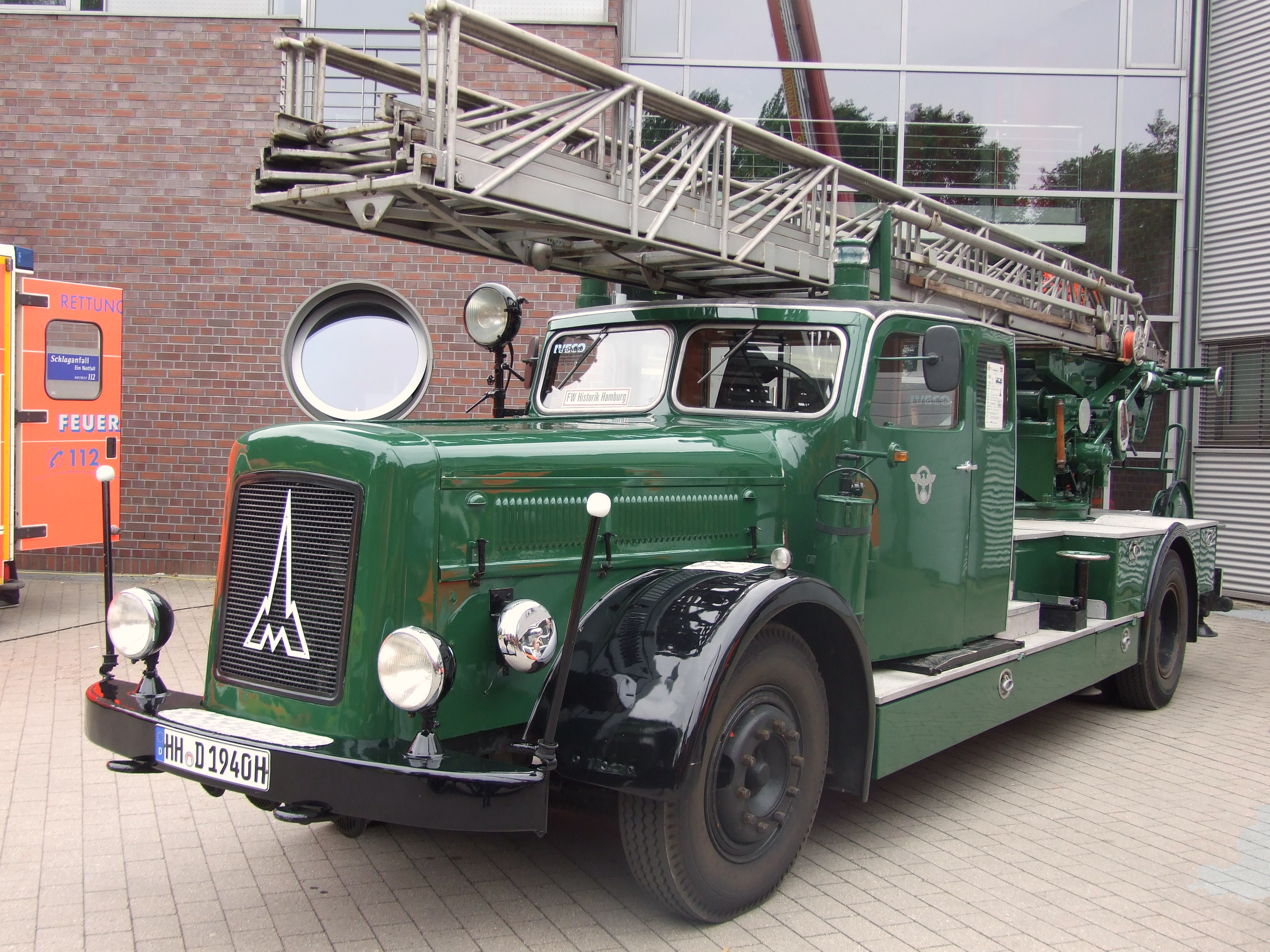
Green fire vehicle.

The 1938 Law on Firefighting defined the Feuerschutzpolizei as a tightly organized auxiliary police force under state supervision, guided by the Führerprinzip, uniformly structured throughout the Reich, and led by trained personnel. The Reich Minister of the Interior was to determine which cities were to establish a fire protection police force and in which cities an existing professional fire brigade was to be converted into a fire protection police force. Paragraph 2 of the aforementioned law stated that the officers of the fire protection police were sworn police officers and, according to paragraph 4, the general civil service regulations also applied to them. Paragraph 3 of the aforementioned law set the age limit for fire protection police officers at the completed age of 60.

The uniform of the fire protection police was green, similar to that of the regular police, with a few organization-specific nuances that were barely distinguishable to the public. Police rank titles and insignia were adopted. Existing vehicles and trailers were to be repainted "police green" and marked with Feuerschutzpolizei. Police insignia and place names initially remained unchanged. Standard training regulations for all fire services were introduced for all fire service branches; these were published as police service regulations.

In 1941 there were Fire Protection Police units in 86 cities in Germany, in Ostmark (occupied Austria) and in General Government (occupied Poland). Outside these cities, the German fire services consisted of volunteer fire brigades, in cooperation with compulsory fire brigades (Pflichtfeuerwehr) and industrial fire brigades (Werkfeuerwehr). In spite of being a branch of the Ordnungspolizei, the Fire Protection Police was a municipal institution; respective cities having the budgetary responsibility for staff and equipment. Administratively and operationally the Fire Protection Police were, however, subordinated to the Ordnungspolizei.

== Field Units ==
During the war, the Feuerschutzpolizei organized six motorized firefighting regiments. Their mission was to follow the German army's advance and have the main responsibility for the occupied territories fire protection and civil defense. Each regiment consisted of some 1000 firefighters.

In 1943 the regimental organization was abolished, the battalions becoming independent units. The fourth regiment was stood down, while nine battalions were formed from the rest. Each battalion consisted of about 400 fire fighters in three companies. A fourth company of non-citizens (Volksdeutsche, Ukrainians and Poles), were later added.

- Feuerschutzpolizei-Regiment 1 Sachsen, 1939–1943
- Feuerschutzpolizei-Regiment 2 Hannover, 1941–1943
- Feuerschutzpolizei-Regiment 3 Ostpreussen, 1941–1943
- Feuerschutzpolizei-Regiment 4 Ukraine, 1941–1943
- Feuerschutzpolizei-Regiment 5 Böhmen-Mähren, 1942–1943
- Feuerschutzpolizei-Regiment 6 Niederlande, 1942–1943

== Ranks ==
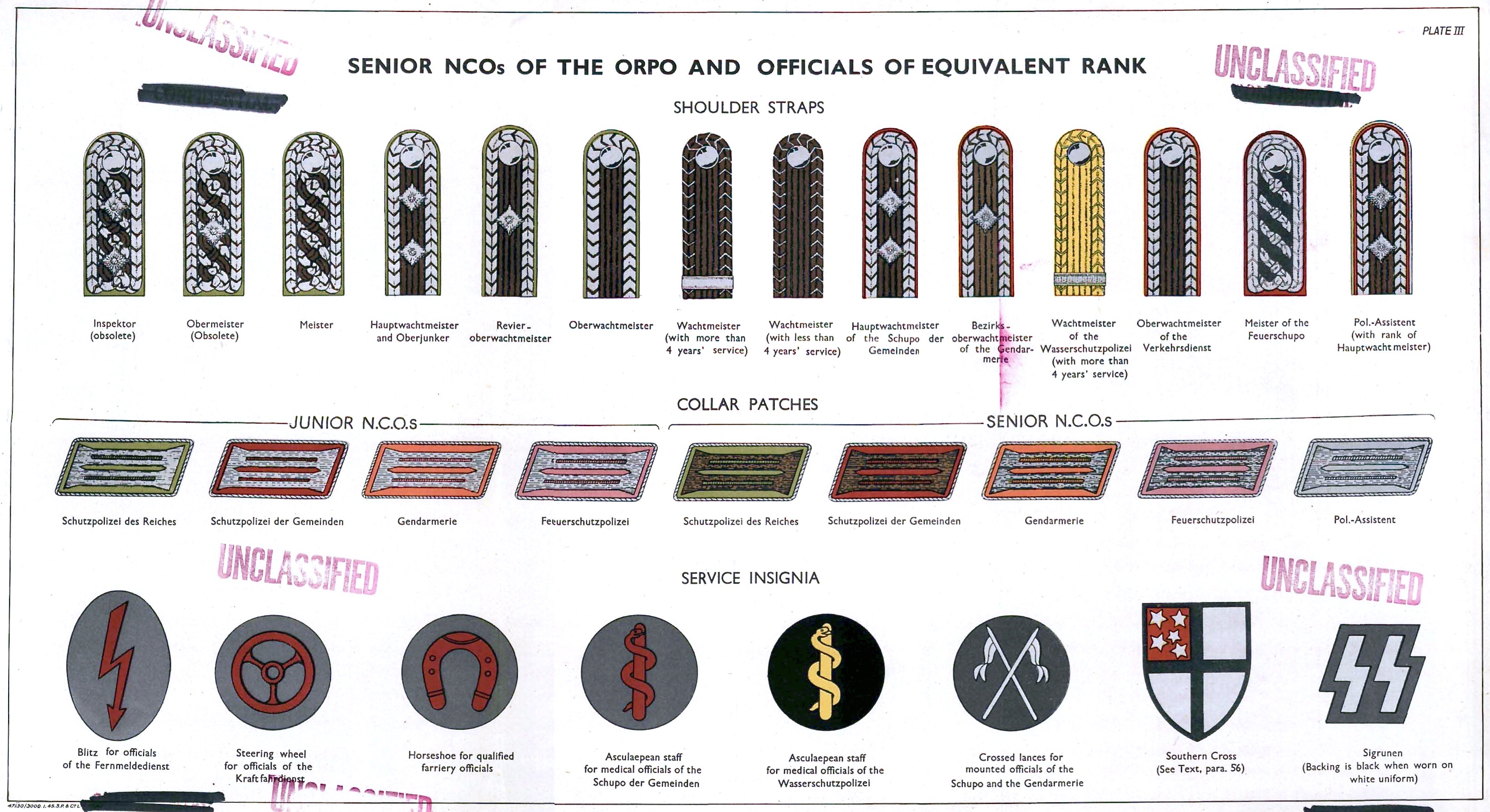
Ordnungspolizei rank insignia, including the Feuerschutzpolizei.

Professional Fire Departments (1935–1938)	Feuerschutzpolizei (1938–1941)	Feuerschutzpolizei (1941–1945)	Insignia	Corresponding rank in the SS (Wehrmacht)
–	–	Generalleutnant		SS-Gruppenführer (Generalleutnant)
Oberbranddirektor (Note: The fire chief of Berlin.)	Generalmajor	Generalmajor		SS-Brigadeführer (Generalmajor)
Oberbranddirektor; Branddirektor	Oberst	Oberst		SS-Standartenführer (Oberst)
Oberbaurat	Oberstleutnant	Oberstleutnant		SS-Obersturmbannführer (Oberstleutnant)
Baurat	Major	Major		SS-Sturmbannführer (Major)
Brandingenieur; Brandoberingenieur; Baurat (Note: With less than three years in the rank.)	Hauptmann	Hauptmann		SS-Hauptsturmführer (Hauptmann)
–	–	Bezirkshauptmann		SS-Hauptsturmführer (Hauptmann)
–	Inspektor	Bezirksoberleutnant		SS-Obersturmführer (Oberleutnant)
Oberbrandmeister	Obermeister	Leutnant		SS-Untersturmführer (Leutnant)
–	–	Bezirksleutnant		SS-Untersturmführer (Leutnant)
Brandmeister	Meister	Meister		SS-Sturmscharführer (Stabsfeldwebel)
Löschmeister	Hauptwachtmeister	Hauptwachtmeister		SS-Hauptscharführer (Oberfeldwebel)
Oberfeuerwehrmann	Bezirksoberwachtmeister	Bezirksoberwachtmeister		SS-Oberscharführer (Feldwebel)
–	Oberwachtmeister	Oberwachtmeister		SS-Scharführer (Unterfeldwebel)
Feuerwehrmann	Wachtmeister	Wachtmeister		SS-Unterscharführer (Unteroffizier)
–	–	Rottwachtmeister		SS-Rottenführer (Obergefreiter)
–	–	Unterwachtmeister (Note: Only in the field units)		SS-Sturmmann (Gefreiter)
–	–	Anwärter (Note: With more than six months in the rank.)	No insignia	SS-Mann (Oberschütze)
–	–	Anwärter	No insignia	SS-Anwärter (Schütze)
