= Special meaning =

Special meaning when used formally refers to the fixed or restricted interpretation of certain words or phrases allowed in certain matters.

== United Kingdom ==
In the jurisdictions of the United Kingdom, certain words or phrases are interpreted in their particular context as having only the meaning or meanings allowed by relevant statute, regulation or case law:

'In these Guidelines a number of terms are used which are intended to have a special meaning for the purpose of the Guidelines.'

[Guidelines on the Meaning of Research and Development for Tax Purposes - issued by the United Kingdom Secretary of State for Trade and Industry for the purposes of Section 837A Income and Corporation Taxes Act 1988.]
