= Dick Lehr =

American journalist (born 1954)

- Born: May 3, 1954 (age 72); Connecticut, United States
- Education: Harvard University; University of Connecticut
- Occupations: Author, journalist, professor of journalism
- Writing career
- Genres: Nonfiction, crime, history
- Notable awards: Edgar Award 2001; Gerald Loeb Award 1992
- Website: dicklehr.com

Dick Lehr (born May 3, 1954) is an American author, journalist and a professor of journalism at Boston University. He is known for co-authoring The New York Times bestseller and Edgar Award winner Black Mass: Whitey Bulger, the FBI and a Devil's Deal, and its sequel, Whitey: The Life of America's Most Notorious Mob Boss with fellow journalist Gerard O'Neill.

== Life and career ==
Lehr grew up in Connecticut. He attended The Gunnery School, in Washington, Connecticut, and later attended Harvard University, graduating in 1976. While working for the Hartford Courant, Lehr received a Juris Doctor degree from the University of Connecticut School of Law in 1984.

Lehr was a John S. Knight Journalism Fellowships at Stanford in 1991–1992. From 1985 to 2003, he was a reporter at The Boston Globe, where he was the Globe's legal affairs reporter, magazine and feature writer, and a longtime member of the Spotlight Team, an investigative reporting unit. He was a Pulitzer Prize finalist in investigative reporting. He was a Visiting Journalist-in-Residence at The Schuster Institute for Investigative Journalism at Brandeis University in 2007.

Lehr left the Globe in 2003 and became a professor of journalism at Boston University College of Communication.

== Published works ==
In January 1989, he co-authored his first book, The Underboss: The Rise and Fall of a Mafia Family, with Gerard O'Neill published first by St. Martin's Press and later editions by PublicAffairs.

In May 2000, Black Mass was released, which he also co-authored with O'Neill. Pulling from their investigations on the Spotlight Team, Black Mass detailed the illicit relationship between Boston crime boss James "Whitey" Bulger and FBI special agent John Connolly. The book became a New York Times bestseller and won the 2001 Edgar Award for best fact crime. In 2015 the film adaptation of Black Mass premiered, with Johnny Depp playing the role of Whitey Bulger and Benedict Cumberbatch playing Whitey's brother Bill Bulger. In the movie, Lehr makes a cameo as a patron in a restaurant.

Judgment Ridge: The True Story Behind the Dartmouth Murders was published in September 2003 by HarperCollins, co-authored with fellow Globe reporter Mitchell Zuckoff.

In June, 2009, Lehr published his first solo project, The Fence: A Police Cover-up Along Boston's Racial Divide published by HarperCollins, a non-fiction narrative about the police beating of Michael Cox, an officer working in plainclothes who was mistaken for a fleeing murder suspect. It was the worst known case of police brutality in Boston history. The Fence was an Edgar Award finalist for best non-fiction. Lionsgate Television is developing a limited dramatic series based on the book.

In 2011, James "Whitey" Bulger was arrested in Santa Monica, California after successfully evading law enforcement for nearly two decades. After his capture, Lehr co-wrote with O'Neill the definitive biography of Bulger, Whitey: The Life of America's Most Notorious Mob Boss, which was published by Crown in February 2013.

In 2014, Lehr authored The Birth of a Movement: How Birth of a Nation Ignited the Battle for Civil Rights published by PublicAffairs. In the book, Lehr recaptures the firestorm that ensued after the 1915 release of The Birth of a Nation, zeroing in on the parallel narratives of two men entrenched in the controversy: an African-American journalist and agitator William Monroe Trotter and D.W. Griffith who created the film. In February 2017, Lehr was featured in a PBS documentary titled The Birth of a Movement as part of its Independent Lens documentary series.

In 2014, Lehr began penning his first young adult novel, Trell, inspired by a series of articles he wrote from the Globe about the questionable conviction for first-degree murder (later overturned) of a young drug dealer, Shawn Drumgold. The novel was published by Candlewick Press in September 2017. In it, a Boston teen named Trell teams up with a Globe reporter to try to uncover the evidence to show her father was wrongfully convicted for murder. Feature film rights were acquired by Tonik Productions.

In 2020, Lehr completed his first World War II nonfiction narrative for HarperCollins, Dead Reckoning: The Story of How Johnny Mitchell and His Fighter Pilots Took on Admiral Yamamoto and Avenged Pearl Harbor. The epic true story chronicles the high-stakes operation undertaken in April 1943 to shoot down the iconic Japanese commander and architect of the deadly Pearl Harbor attack – a longshot mission hatched hastily at the U.S. base on Guadalcanal.

In 2021, HarperCollins' Mariner Books published Lehr's riveting account of a secret plot by white nationalists in 2016 to bomb Somali refugees living in Kansas that was averted when a local man infiltrated the militia group for the FBI. White Hot Hate: A True Story of Domestic Terrorism in America's Heartland foreshadowed the growing far-right militia movement in the U.S. that culminated in the January 6, 2021 insurrection at the U.S. Capitol. In November 2021, Lehr was featured in documentary about the bomb plot produced by George Stephanopoulos Productions and ABC News. The Informant: Fear and Faith in America's Heartland debuted on Hulu on November 1, 2021.

== Honors ==
- 1992 Gerald Loeb Award for Large Newspapers for "Coverage of Massachusetts' Public Pension Scandal"
- 2001 Edgar Award for best fact crime.
- The Hill School's writer-in-residence

== Books ==
- Lehr, Dick; O'Neill, Gerard (August 6, 2008). The Underboss: The Rise and Fall of a Mafia Family. PublicAffairs. ISBN 978-0-7867-2550-2.
- The Fence: A Police Cover-up Along Boston's Racial Divide (2009)
- Judgment Ridge: The True Story Behind the Dartmouth Murders (2009)
- Lehr, Dick; O'Neill, Gerard (May 22, 2012). Black Mass: Whitey Bulger, the FBI, and a Devil's Deal. PublicAffairs. ISBN 978-1-61039-168-9.
- Lehr, Dick; O'Neill, Gerard (August 27, 2013). Whitey: The Life of America's Most Notorious Mob Boss. Crown. ISBN 978-0-307-98655-9.
- Black Mass: Der verhängnisvolle Pakt zwischen dem FBI und Whitey Bulger, einem der gefährlichsten Gangster der US-Geschichte (German Edition) (2015)
- The Birth of a Movement: How Birth of a Nation Ignited the Battle for Civil Rights (2017)
- Trell (2017)
- Dead Reckoning: The Story of How Johnny Mitchell and His Fighter Pilots Took on Admiral Yamamoto and Avenged Pearl Harbor (2020)
- White Hot Hate: A True Story of Domestic Terrorism in America's Heartland (2021)
