= Black Mass (film) =

2015 film by Scott Cooper

- Theatrical release poster
- Directed by: Scott Cooper
- Screenplay by: Mark Mallouk; Jez Butterworth
- Based on: Black Mass: Whitey Bulger, the FBI, and a Devil's Deal by Dick Lehr and Gerard O'Neill
- Produced by: John Lesher; Brian Oliver; Scott Cooper; Patrick McCormick; Tyler Thompson
- Starring: Johnny Depp; Joel Edgerton; Benedict Cumberbatch; Rory Cochrane; Jesse Plemons; Kevin Bacon
- Cinematography: Masanobu Takayanagi
- Edited by: David Rosenbloom
- Music by: Tom Holkenborg
- Production companies: Cross Creek Pictures; RatPac-Dune Entertainment; Le Grisbi Productions; Head Gear Films; Vendian Entertainment
- Distributed by: Warner Bros. Pictures
- Release dates: September 4, 2015 (Venice); September 18, 2015 (United States)
- Running time: 123 minutes
- Country: United States
- Language: English
- Budget: $53 million
- Box office: $100 million

Black Mass is a 2015 American biographical crime drama film about American mobster Whitey Bulger. Directed by Scott Cooper and written by Mark Mallouk and Jez Butterworth, it is based on Dick Lehr and Gerard O'Neill's 2000 book Black Mass: The True Story of an Unholy Alliance Between the FBI and the Irish Mob. The film features an ensemble cast led by Johnny Depp as Bulger, alongside Joel Edgerton, Benedict Cumberbatch, Kevin Bacon, Jesse Plemons, Peter Sarsgaard, Dakota Johnson, and Corey Stoll.

Principal photography of the film took place in Boston between May and August 2014. The film had its world premiere at the 72nd Venice International Film Festival and was released by Warner Bros. Pictures worldwide on September 18, 2015. It received generally positive reviews and grossed $100 million on a $53 million budget.

== Plot ==
In 1975, James "Whitey" Bulger, leader of the Winter Hill Gang, controls most organized crime within South Boston, along with his right-hand man Stephen Flemmi, newcomer Kevin Weeks, and callous hitman Johnny Martorano. Bulger's supremacy is challenged by the North End-based Angiulo Brothers, a rival gang that is part of the New England Mafia family. FBI agent John Connolly returns to the area, having grown up in South Boston as a friend of Whitey and his brother, Massachusetts Senate president William "Billy" Bulger.

After the Angiulo Brothers murder a Winter Hill soldier, Whitey becomes an informant for Connolly who wants to infiltrate the Angiulo Brothers' organization. Whitey hates the idea of being a rat, but understands what the resultant protection would afford him, his gang, and his family. Bulger lives with his longtime girlfriend, Lindsey Cyr, and their young son who suffers from Reye syndrome.

Whitey increasingly exploits his status as an informant, using the "protection" offered by Connolly and his partner John Morris, as cover for their crimes. When Connolly demands information on the Angiulos' racketeering locations, Whitey gets pictures of the rival gang's hideouts, allowing the FBI to plant wiretaps. The resulting arrests by the FBI effectively consoldiate Whitey's power in the underworld. Nostalgia blinds Connolly to his growing corruption as he becomes increasingly close to Whitey and his gang, even hosting them at his home. His wife, Marianne, grows alarmed as he begins accepting money and expensive gifts from the criminals.

When Brian Halloran, an associate, fears for his own life and reports Whitey's involvement to the FBI, Connoly reveals the accusation to Whitey and Halloran is murdered. Whitey's behavior becomes increasingly violent and unpredictable after his mother's death. Whitey murders an informant within the Winter Hill Gang after a smuggled weapons shipment for the IRA is seized. When "bulldog" prosecutor Fred Wyshak becomes assistant U.S. Attorney in Boston, Connolly is unsuccessful in diverting attention from Whitey and Wyshak demands Whitey's arrest. Wyshak and FBI leadership investigate Connolly's relationship to Whitey and realize most of the tips credited to Whitey were actually obtained from other informants. Morris, fearing prosecution, divulges Connolly's and Whitey's relationship to The Boston Globe, and a front-page story exposes the FBI's links to organized crime. Connolly and Winter Hill gangsters are arrested, but Whitey escapes Boston.

Epilogue: Weeks and Martorano served reduced prison sentences and returned to the streets of Boston. Flemmi received a life sentence after pleading guilty to ten murders. Morris was granted immunity for testifying against Connolly. Billy left the state senate but his contacts with Whitey forced him to resign his post as Chancellor of the University of Massachusetts. Opting not to testify against Bulger, Connolly received a forty-year sentence for the second-degree murder of John Callahan. After Whitey's escape in 1995, he spent twelve years on the FBI's most wanted list. An anonymous tip led to his arrest in Santa Monica, California in 2011 and he received two consecutive life sentences plus five years for the deaths of at least eleven people.

== Cast ==
- Johnny Depp as James "Whitey" Bulger
- Joel Edgerton as John Connolly
- Benedict Cumberbatch as William "Billy" Bulger
- Rory Cochrane as Stephen Flemmi
- Jesse Plemons as Kevin Weeks
- W. Earl Brown as Johnny Martorano
- David Harbour as John Morris
- Dakota Johnson as Lindsey Cyr
- Julianne Nicholson as Marianne Connolly (née Lockary)
- Kevin Bacon as Charles McGuire
- Corey Stoll as Fred Wyshak
- Peter Sarsgaard as Brian Halloran
- Adam Scott as Robert Fitzpatrick
- Juno Temple as Deborah Hussey
- Bill Camp as John Callahan
- Brad Carter as John McIntyre
- Mark Mahoney as Mickey Maloney
- Scott Anderson as Tommy King
- Erica McDermott as Mary Bulger
- Jamie Donnelly as Ms. Cody
- David DeBeck as Roger Wheeler
- Patrick M. Walsh Jr as Michael Donahue
- Jeremy Strong as Josh Bond (uncredited)
- James Russo as Scott Garriola (uncredited)

== Production ==
=== Development ===
An idea for a film adaptation of Black Mass: The True Story of an Unholy Alliance Between the FBI and the Irish Mob garnered interest intermittently since 2000. Even before its published release, the book's film rights had already been sold to Miramax, when Harvey Weinstein was still part of the company. According to co-author Dick Lehr, Weinstein had never exercised the film option for unknown reasons, and the rights expired. At one point afterwards, in 2002, filmmaker Robert Greenwald had planned to adapt Black Mass into a 4-hour miniseries for USA Network, but the project was never developed. Eventually in 2006, film producer Brian Oliver acquired the film rights for Black Mass, and was set to produce the adaptation with CP Production partners Michael Cerenzie and Christine Peters.

After Oliver's acquisition, Jim Sheridan was attached to direct the film. In 2009, Sheridan had finished writing a draft of the adapted screenplay with Nye Heron, and principal photography was reportedly scheduled to begin in April 2010. However, in December 2010, while discussing the troubled production of his 2011 film Dream House, Sheridan hinted at his detachment from the Black Mass project. Oliver's then-newly founded Cross Creek Pictures film production company took over financing for Black Mass, and Sheridan's exit was confirmed when Russell Gewirtz was hired in 2011 to write another draft for the adaptation, and Barry Levinson was attached to direct instead. The finished version of Black Mass was scripted by Mark Mallouk and Jez Butterworth, and has been billed as the "true story of Whitey Bulger, FBI agent John Connolly and the FBI's witness protection program that was created by J. Edgar Hoover."

Later in January 2014, Scott Cooper was attached to re-write and direct the film. On February 27, 2014, Warner Bros. picked up the film's worldwide distribution rights, eyeing an October 2015 release, and the studio co-financed the film with Cross Creek.

=== Casting ===
Johnny Depp's involvement with Black Mass dates back to February 2013, when he was attached to star in the film, while Barry Levinson was still slated to direct and principal photography was scheduled to begin in May 2013. Depp briefly exited the project shortly after its sale at the 66th annual Cannes Film Festival, because of a salary dispute with Cross Creek Pictures. He later rejoined at around the same time Scott Cooper was attached to replace Levinson as director, and his signing for the film was made official in February 2014. Jesse Plemons and Juno Temple joined the cast to play as Kevin Weeks and Deborah Hussey, one of Bulger's victims, respectively, around April 2014. Plemons reportedly prepared for his role by hiring a dialect coach and studying video of the actual Kevin Weeks.

Benedict Cumberbatch replaced Guy Pearce as William "Billy" Bulger on May 22, 2014. On June 10, it was announced that Jeremy Strong would co-star in the film. On June 14, James Russo joined the cast of the film to play Scott Garriola, one of the FBI agents who took down Bulger. On June 26, Kevin Bacon was added to the cast to play Charles McGuire, the FBI Special Agent in charge of the Boston field office and John Connolly's boss. On July 1, David Harbour was added to the cast of the film to star as John Morris, a corrupt FBI agent.

Cooper chose Nicholson after her performance as Sally in Sam Shepard's off-Broadway play Heartless (before Claire van der Boom succeeded her for the play's two-week extension). Edgerton developed his portrayal of Connolly by studying past footage of the FBI agent before his imprisonment, some of which include his appearances on talk shows and in courtrooms. In an interview with The Wall Street Journal, Edgerton stated that he declined trying to meet with the actual Connolly, reasoning that Connolly "has one version of events and the film has a different version". Edgerton originally dropped out of the project when Depp agreed to return, and Tom Hardy was in early talks for the role. However, Edgerton returned in the role.

In preparing for his role, Depp similarly studied surveillance and police audio footage involving Bulger. The actor was adamant in depicting the Boston gang leader's criminal and personal life as would be ultimately portrayed in the film. To achieve that, Depp attempted to meet with Bulger himself, but was declined a meeting and instead consulted Jay Carney, Bulger's attorney. Carney appeared on set a few times, to provide feedback on Depp's performance.

=== Filming ===
Principal photography commenced on May 19, 2014, in Boston; actors were seen filming scenes in Dorchester. On May 23, some scenes were also filmed at Polish American Club (altered to recreate West Broadway's Triple O's Lounge, Whitey's infamous South Boston hangout), on Cambridge Street in Cambridge. On May 27, filming was taking place in East Boston, where Johnny Depp and Jesse Plemons were seen together on the set. Next day on May 28, Joel Edgerton was seen during filming of a scene on Silver Street in South Boston. On June 4, Depp was spotted in Lynn during a recreation of the 1982 murders of Brian Halloran and Michael Donahue by Bulger. From June 6 to 7, Depp was seen filming scenes at Copley Square in Boston.

On June 9, Depp's 51st birthday, he was filming scenes on location in Quincy, while Dakota Johnson was in Back Bay, playing Whitey Bulger's longtime former girlfriend, Lindsey Cyr. On June 11, shooting was underway in Lynn, where the crew was filming scenes in which Bulger and Stephen Flemmi pick up a prostitute named Deborah Hussey (played by Juno Temple) from the police station. Temple was seen on the set. On June 16, Depp and Plemons were spotted on the set of the film in South Boston.

On June 20, news posted some photos from the set of the film, which features classic cars from the film set in South Boston. On June 23, Cumberbatch and Depp were spotted during a re-creation of Saint Patrick's Day parade scenes in Lynn. On June 24, scenes were shot at the Harvard Club in Boston. On June 26, Cumberbatch was spotted with crew while filming around Ashmont Grill in Dorchester. On June 29, the pavement outside South Boston High School had graffiti readings of "Stop Forced Busing" and "Press Print the Truth."

On July 2, Depp and Cumberbatch were together filming some scenes in Boston. On July 7–8, filming was set to take place on Gilson Road in Quincy. A four-story building on 6 Gilson Road was transformed to resemble the Princess Eugenia apartments in Santa Monica, California, where FBI agents arrested Bulger on June 22, 2011. Arrest scenes were filmed there on July 7 and 8, and Sienna Miller was spotted dressed as Catherine Greig. From July 8–10, scenes were filmed on Revere Beach, so that a portion of Revere Beach remained closed. Between July 11–12, Revere Beach Boulevard remained closed for shooting. Revere Beach was transformed into Miami Beach, Florida, as live palm trees had been planted in the sand and a pizza restaurant was transformed into a Cuban cafe on Revere Beach Boulevard across the street from Beach. Depp as Whitey Bulger and Miller as Catherine Greig were spotted on the Black Mass set on the Revere Beach on July 10, 2014.

On July 15, Cumberbatch wrapped filming for his part in Boston. On July 21, Depp filmed some scenes at the former Anthony's Hawthorne restaurant, located at Oxford Street and Central Avenue in Lynn, which wrapped up filming for his role.

In July, director Cooper told The Boston Globe that filming had to take place for two more weeks in Boston, focusing on the FBI's role in the Bulger story. On July 25, Kevin Bacon was in Boston, filming some remaining scenes for the film. According to The Boston Globe, filming for Black Mass wrapped up on August 1, 2014, in Boston.

=== Post-production ===
Sienna Miller was cast and filmed scenes as Catherine Greig, Bulger's companion while a fugitive, but her scenes ended up getting cut from the film due to "narrative choices". Erica McDermott was cast as Mary Bulger, wife of Billy Bulger, but the majority of her scenes were cut out.

== Release ==
On June 30, 2014, Warner Bros. Pictures set the film for a September 18, 2015 worldwide release. It was selected to be shown in the "Fuori Concorso" section of the Venice Film Festival. It was also shown at the Telluride Film Festival the next day, and in the Special Presentation section of the 2015 Toronto International Film Festival.

=== Marketing ===
On April 23, 2015, the first trailer for the film was released, followed by a second trailer on May 22. A third trailer was released on July 30.

=== Home media ===
Black Mass was released on DVD and Blu-ray on February 16, 2016.

== Reception ==
=== Box office ===
Black Mass grossed $62.6 million in the United States and Canada, and $37.2 million in other territories, for a worldwide total of $99.8 million, against a production budget of $53 million.

In the United States and Canada, the film was released alongside Maze Runner: The Scorch Trials and Captive, and was projected to earn around $26 million from 3,188 theaters in its opening weekend. It grossed $8.8 million on its first day, including $1.4 million from its early Thursday showings. It ended up debuting to $22.6 million, finishing second at the box office behind fellow newcomer Maze Runner: The Scorch Trials ($30.3 million). It dropped 51% in its second weekend, making $11 million and finishing 5th.

=== Critical response ===
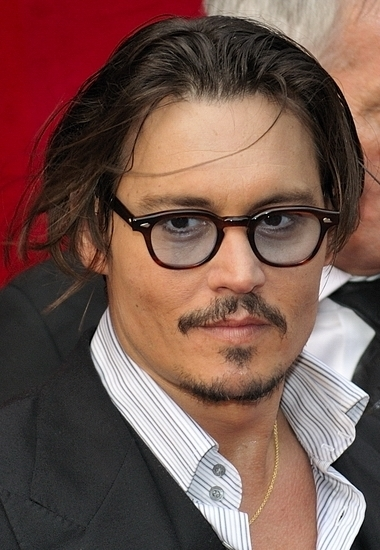
Johnny Depp's performance as James "Whitey" Bulger received critical acclaim.

On Rotten Tomatoes, the film has an approval rating of 74% based on 289 reviews and an average rating of 6.7/10. The site's critical consensus reads, "Black Mass spins a gripping yarn out of its fact-based story – and leaves audiences with one of Johnny Depp's most compelling performances in years." On Metacritic, the film has a rating of 68 out of 100, based on 43 critics, indicating "generally favorable" reviews. Audiences polled by CinemaScore gave the film an average grade of "B" on an A+ to F scale.

Depp's portrayal of Bulger received critical acclaim with many calling it a return to form. Critics from The Hollywood Reporter, Variety, and TheWrap called it one of his best performances to date. The Hollywood Reporter's Todd McCarthy, in addition to praising the film, called Depp's performance "fully convincing and frightening", saying it is "very welcome at this point in his career and one of his best."

Similarly, Indie Wire's Eric Kohn praised the cast and highlighted Depp's performance and Cooper's directorial efforts to depict "the haunting legacy of Bulger's criminal deeds, and the lingering sense that no justice can erase their impact." Admiring Black Mass as an "elegantly understated crime drama", Variety's Scott Foundas positively compared Depp's performance in the film to his earlier roles with Tim Burton.

TheWrap's Alonso Duralde praised Depp's performance, but was less positive towards the film's pacing and short onscreen appearances of some supporting characters. BBC Culture's Nicolas Barber found some of the subplots to be unnecessary (specifically mentioning Benedict Cumberbatch as Billy Bulger), and argued that "the film is never bad, but, given the gob-smacking true story, it's disappointing that it's not great".

In a negative review, CraveOnline's Fred Topel labeled Black Mass as a "black mess". He criticized the screenwriting and argued that the film borrows too heavily from Goodfellas, writing: "...it's clear that the filmmakers wanted to turn this into Goodfellas and tried to shoehorn this story into a similar kind of seductive, funny, shocking gangster tale. ...Several scenes seem to want to be like the 'how am I funny?' scene in Goodfellas, but it's blatant".

=== Response by the subjects ===
Whitey Bulger himself disapproved of the film and refused to see it; his associate Kevin Weeks, while admitting the killings took place, otherwise called the movie "pure fiction", comprehensively disputing most of the film's depiction of events. Most crucially he also disavowed the characterisations of the key figures:

The only resemblance to Whitey's character was the hairline. [...] The mannerisms—the way that Whitey talked to us—he never swore at us. In all the years I was with that man, he never swore at me once. We never yelled at each other. [...] The language is all wrong [...] and Whitey never would've berated Stevie, either. Stevie was a psychopath. Stevie would've killed him. [...] Stevie wasn't all sympathetic, mourning, and sorrowful like he is in the movie. Stevie enjoyed murder.

Weeks also disagrees completely with his portrayal in the film— for instance, the suggestion the loss of his son had any impact on his behavior, or that Bulger ever once discussed business at home or with his brother.

=== Accolades ===
Award	Category	Recipient	Result
Indiana Film Journalists Association Awards	Best Actor	Johnny Depp	Nominated
Santa Barbara International Film Festival	Maltin Modern Master Award	Johnny Depp	Won
Satellite Awards	Best Film	Black Mass	Nominated
Satellite Awards	Best Actor – Motion Picture	Johnny Depp	Nominated
Satellite Awards	Best Adapted Screenplay	Jez Butterworth, Mark Mallouk	Nominated
Saturn Awards	Best Thriller Film	Black Mass	Nominated
Saturn Awards	Best Make-Up	Joel Harlow, Kenny Niederbaumer	Nominated
Screen Actors Guild Award	Outstanding Performance by a Male Actor in a Leading Role	Johnny Depp	Nominated
Washington D.C. Area Film Critics Association	Best Actor	Johnny Depp	Nominated
Palm Springs International Film Festival	Desert Palm Achievement Award (actor)	Johnny Depp	Won
Critics' Choice Movie Award	Best Actor	Johnny Depp	Nominated
Critics' Choice Movie Award	Best Makeup		Nominated

Lindsay Kimble of People believed Depp deserved an Academy Award nomination for his performance as Bulger and was surprised when his name was excluded from the list of nominees.

== Soundtrack ==
The film's soundtrack is written and composed by Tom Holkenborg. It was released by WaterTower Music on September 11, 2015.
