= Gerard O'Neill =

American journalist (1942–2019)

- Born: Gerard Michael O'Neill; September 1, 1942; Boston, Massachusetts, U.S.
- Died: August 22, 2019 (aged 76); Boston, Massachusetts, U.S.
- Occupations: Journalist, editor
- Spouse: Janet Reardon (m. 1968)
- Children: 2

Gerard Michael O'Neill (September 1, 1942 – August 22, 2019) was an American journalist, newspaper editor, and writer. A long time investigative reporter for The Boston Globe, he was awarded the Pulitzer Prize for Investigative Reporting three times.

== Life and career ==
Born in Boston, O'Neill graduated from Stoughton High School and Stonehill College; earning a degree in English at the latter institution in 1964. He attended George Washington University Law School before earning a master's degree in journalism from Boston University in 1970. For 35 years he was an investigative reporter and editor for The Boston Globe, and was notably one of the three original reporters on the Globe's " Spotlight" team. He was first awarded the Pulitzer Prize for Investigative Reporting in 1972 for a major investigation of corruption in Somerville, Massachusetts; an award he would receive two more times during his career.

O'Neill's most notable piece of investigative reporting was in 1988 when he and journalist Dick Lehr published a story revealing that mobster Whitey Bulger was an FBI informant while still actively committing crimes. The two men would go on to write three books together, including two about Black Mass: The Irish Mob, the FBI, and a Devil’s Deal (2000) and Whitey: The Life of America’s Most Notorious Mob Boss (2013). The former book was an Edgar Award winner, and was made into a 2015 movie starring Johnny Depp as Bulger.

O'Neill died on August 22, 2019, from interstitial lung disease at his home in Needham, Massachusetts.

== Works ==
- Lehr, Dick; O'Neill, Gerard (August 6, 2008). The Underboss: The Rise and Fall of a Mafia Family. PublicAffairs. ISBN 978-0-7867-2550-2.
- Lehr, Dick; O'Neill, Gerard (May 22, 2012). Black Mass: Whitey Bulger, the FBI, and a Devil's Deal. PublicAffairs. ISBN 978-1-61039-168-9.
- Lehr, Dick; O'Neill, Gerard (August 27, 2013). Whitey: The Life of America's Most Notorious Mob Boss. Crown. ISBN 978-0-307-98655-9.
- Lehr, Dick; O'Neill, Gerard (2015). Black Mass: Der verhängnisvolle Pakt zwischen dem FBI und Whitey Bulger, einem der gefährlichsten Gangster der US-Geschichte (German Edition)
