= John J. O'Brien (commissioner) =

American commissioner

John J. O'Brien is a former commissioner of the Massachusetts Probation Service. He was convicted of four counts of mail fraud, and one count of racketeering, and one count of conspiracy. The verdict was pronounced on July 24, 2014, by a 12-member federal jury of the U.S. District Court in Boston, Massachusetts. US District Court Judge William G. Young was the presiding judge. The jury deliberated for seven days and the case lasted two months.

The case centered on patronage hiring at the Massachusetts Probation Department during Mr. O'Brien's tenure as commissioner.

On December 19, 2016, the United States Court of Appeals for the First Circuit reversed the conviction of O'Brien and ordered acquittals on all counts due to insufficiency of evidence. The Court of Appeals also admonished the lower court for the allowance of a high number of juror questions at trial.
