= Massachusetts Probation Service =

- Massachusetts Probation Service seal.
- Abbreviation: MPS

Agency overview
- Formed: 1878

Jurisdictional structure
- Operations jurisdiction: Massachusetts, USA
- Area: 10,565 square miles (27,360 km^{2})
- Population: 6,811,779 (2016 est.)
- Legal jurisdiction: Commonwealth of Massachusetts
- Governing body: Commonwealth of Massachusetts

Operational structure
- Headquarters: Boston, Massachusetts
- Agency executives: Pamerson Ifill, Commissioner; Brian Mirasolo, First Deputy Commissioner
- Parent agency: Trial Court of the Commonwealth

Website
- https://www.mass.gov/orgs/massachusetts-probation-service

The Massachusetts Trial Court Probation Service, more commonly referred to as the Massachusetts Probation Service (MPS), is the Commonwealth's primary supervisory law enforcement agency. Created in 1878, the probation service supervises probationers who have been convicted of crimes.

== History ==
Created in 1878, it is the first Probation agency established in the United States. The service was created based on the work of John Augustus, the Boston area bootmaker who is credited as the "Father of Probation".

== Training and duties ==
Probation Officers are trained to carry out a wide variety of supervisory assignments at locations across the state's 70 District Courts and 12 Superior Courts. Officers are trained to supervise probationers and address a variety of offenses including drug offenses, violent crimes, and sexual offenders. Probation Officers in the District and Superior Courts Probation Departments supervise criminal cases. Felony level cases are handled by the Superior Court Probation.

The state's 12 Probate and Family Court Probation Departments provide a different service addressing domestic relations issues like divorce dispute resolution, child support litigation and enforcement, visitation issues, adoption searches, guardianship suitability and other investigative functions as needed.

There are 11 division of the Juvenile Court Probation Department in Barnstable, Berkshire, Bristol, Essex, Franklin/Hampshire, Hampden, Middlesex, Norfolk, Plymouth, Suffolk and Worcester counties. The Probation Service has several forward leaning programs to attack probation issues, including the Fatherhood Program, Nightlight, Life 101: A Lesson in Reality, and others. The Probation Service has several forward leaning programs to attack probation issues, including the Fatherhood Program, Nightlight, Life 101: A Lesson in Reality, and others.

== Authority and administration ==
Probation Officers are state level law enforcement officers, who frequently coordinate with other Massachusetts governmental agencies like the Massachusetts State Police and other local police departments, Massachusetts Department of Children and Families (DCF), and other private medical and social and human service agencies. Massachusetts Probation Officers are authorized "police powers" by statute. Massachusetts General Laws (MGL), Chapter 276, Section 90, "Powers of probation officers; reports; records; inspection", reads:

"A probation officer shall not be an active member of the regular police force, but so far as necessary in the performance of his official duties shall, except as otherwise provided, have all the powers of a police officer, and if appointed by the superior court may, by its direction, act in any part of the commonwealth. He shall report to the court, and his records may at all times be inspected by police officials of the towns of the commonwealth; provided, that his records in cases arising under sections fifty-two to fifty-nine, inclusive, of chapter one hundred and nineteen shall not be open to inspection without the consent of a justice of his court."

The Office of the Commissioner of Probation (OCP), located in Boston, MA, serves as the central administrative office for the MPS. Appointed by the Chief Justice for Administration and Management (CJAM), the Commissioner establishes standards for probation practice, provides training to probation personnel, and qualifies individuals for appointment as probation officers. The Commissioner's Office also conducts research on statewide crime and delinquency trends.

== Badge ==
The Probation Officer badge is the standard law enforcement badge of the Commonwealth of Massachusetts, similar to that of Massachusetts State Police, Parole Officers, Correctional Officers and Special State Police.

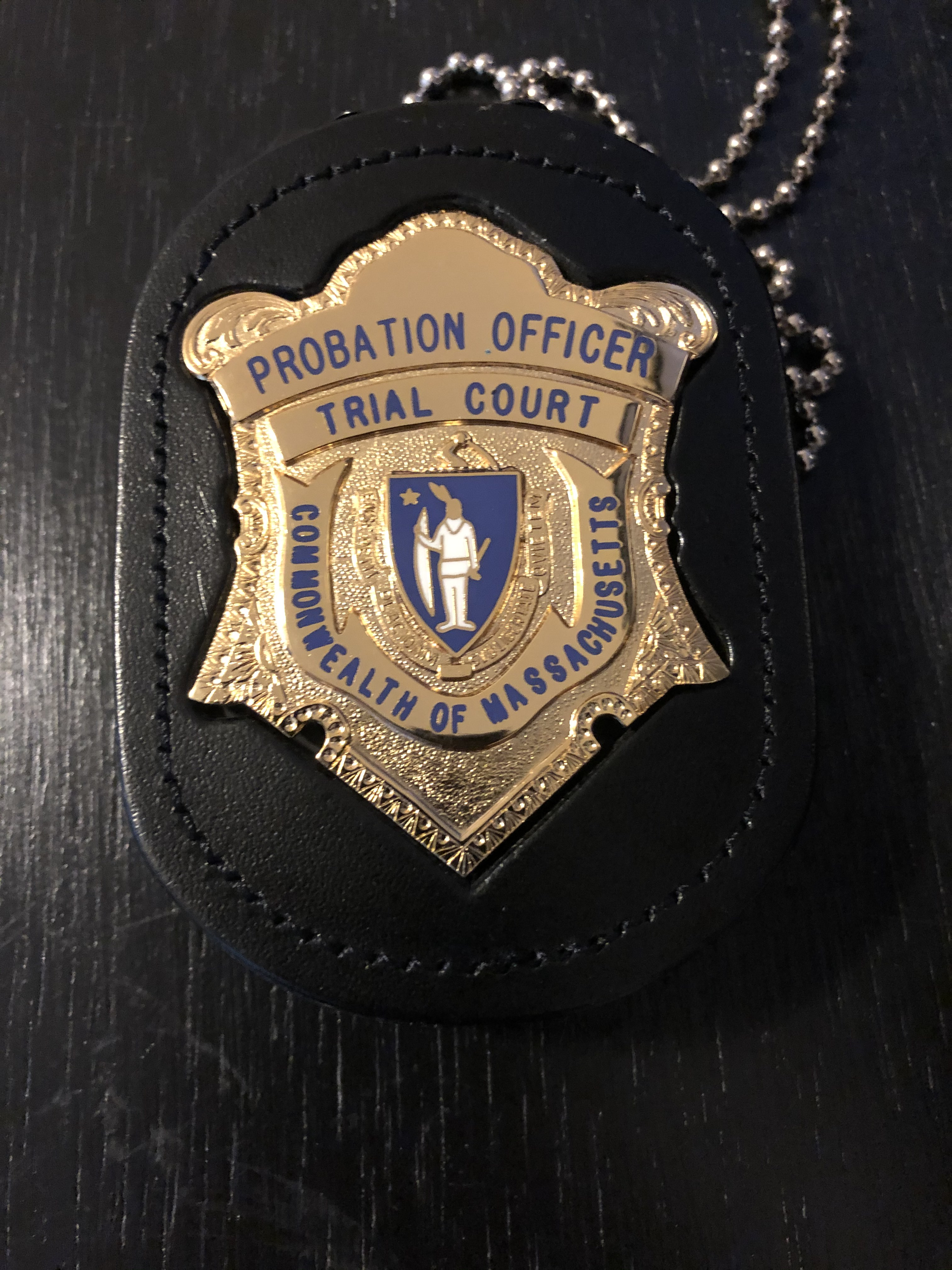

== Scandal ==
In 2009, Commissioner of Probation John J. O'Brien was alleged in published reports of bribing members of the Massachusetts Legislature by giving jobs to their supporters, friends, and relatives. He was convicted of four counts of mail fraud, and one count each for racketeering, and racketeering conspiracy. The verdict was pronounced on July 24, 2014.

On December 19, 2016 the United States Court of Appeals for the First Circuit reversed the conviction of O'Brien and ordered the entry of acquittals on all counts citing insufficiency of evidence. The Court of Appeals also admonished the lower court for the allowance of a high number of juror questions at trial.

In May 2013, Edward Dolan was named the new Commissioner of Probation in the wake of the scandal.
