= Bewell's Cross =

Lost medieval stone cross and boundary marker in Bristol

Bewell's Cross, Bristol
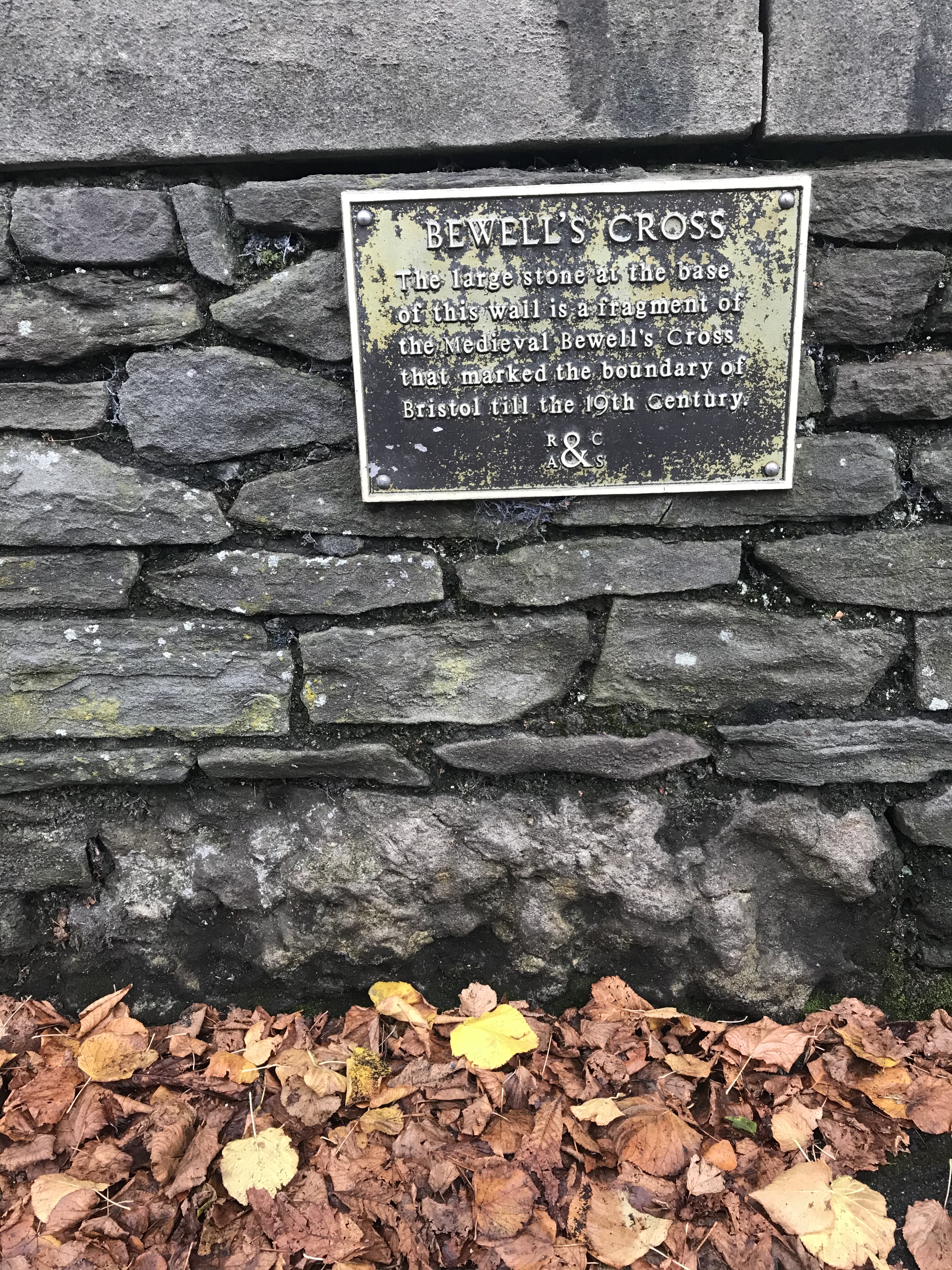
- Reputed fragment of the base of Bewell's Cross.
- Interactive map of Bewell's Cross, Bristol
- 51.462296°N 2.603273°W
- Location: Cotham Road, Bristol

History
- Built: pre 1373
- Demolished: 1829

Site notes
- Area: UK
- Owner: Bristol Corporation

Bewell's Cross was a large medieval stone cross and boundary marker on the northern edge of the County of Bristol. It was also the site of the city gallows from at least the fifteenth century till 1820. The surviving stump of the Cross was dug up in 1829.

== Medieval Origins ==
The name 'Bewel' goes back at least as far as the late twelfth century, when it is referred to in a charter of Count John (later King) as one of four points marking the limits of Bristol. The placenames specialist, Richard Coates, suggests that 'Bewell' is probably derived from the Old English for 'bee well' - i.e. a spring or well associated with bees. However, he notes that is just possible that the name represents a pruning of 'Beowolf's Well', given that a Bristolian called Elias or Elys recorded in about 1270 with the surname Beowolf.

Bewell's Cross itself is first recorded in September 1373, during the perambulation of the boundaries set down to define the newly established county of Bristol. The survey mentions the Cross twice, noting that those perambulating the boundary should go up the highway to Henbury 'as far as a certain cross called Bewellescrosse' (quandam crucem vocatam Bewellescross), and from thence further northwards as far as a stone fixed hard by the spring of Bewelle.' It then goes on to say that the boundary returned back south along 'the same king’s highway as far as another stone fixed hard by (lit. 'prope' = close to) the aforesaid cross on the eastern part of the same cross'. The exact location of the Bewell's Cross was fixed by Dr Evan Jones of the University of Bristol in 2024, based on two depictions of the Cross base on plans of the area conducted in 1792 and 1829. He puts it at the edge of the mini-roundabout by Cotham Church.

Bewell's Cross and the associated gallows and boundary stone are mentioned in William Worcester's 1480 topographical survey of Bristol. This includes a section on the road going up from 'the parish church of St Michael, as far as the tall stone appointed as the boundary of the franchise of the town of Bristol, near the cross and the site of the gallows for the legal punishment, by hanging and putting to death, for traitors and thieves'. Those convicted of capital crimes in medieval and early modern Bristol were imprisoned in Newgate Gaol. On the day of execution they were forced to walk to the gallows through the centre of town and up St Michael's Hill in a form that seemingly reflected Christ's Via Dolorosa. The route, as described by Prof Peter Fleming (UWE), has been mapped and can still be followed today. As with Christ's place of execution, figured by medieval people as Mount Calvary, Bristol's gallows was on top of a hill, on the edge of the town/county. For the condemned, Bewell's Cross itself offered a final reminder of the possibility of Christian redemption. Fifteenth-century 'jail deliveries' for Bristol suggest that about 8 executions took place each year at that time. This is much higher in both absolute numbers and, even more, relative to the population, than the c.2 executions per year of the later eighteenth century.

== Early Modern Period ==
In 1525 the head of the Cross was remade or replaced, it being recorded in the official town chronicle that the Mayor, John Hutton, ‘commaunded that the heddes of the crosses at the galowes and markett place shuld be made of the newe, as they nowe be.’

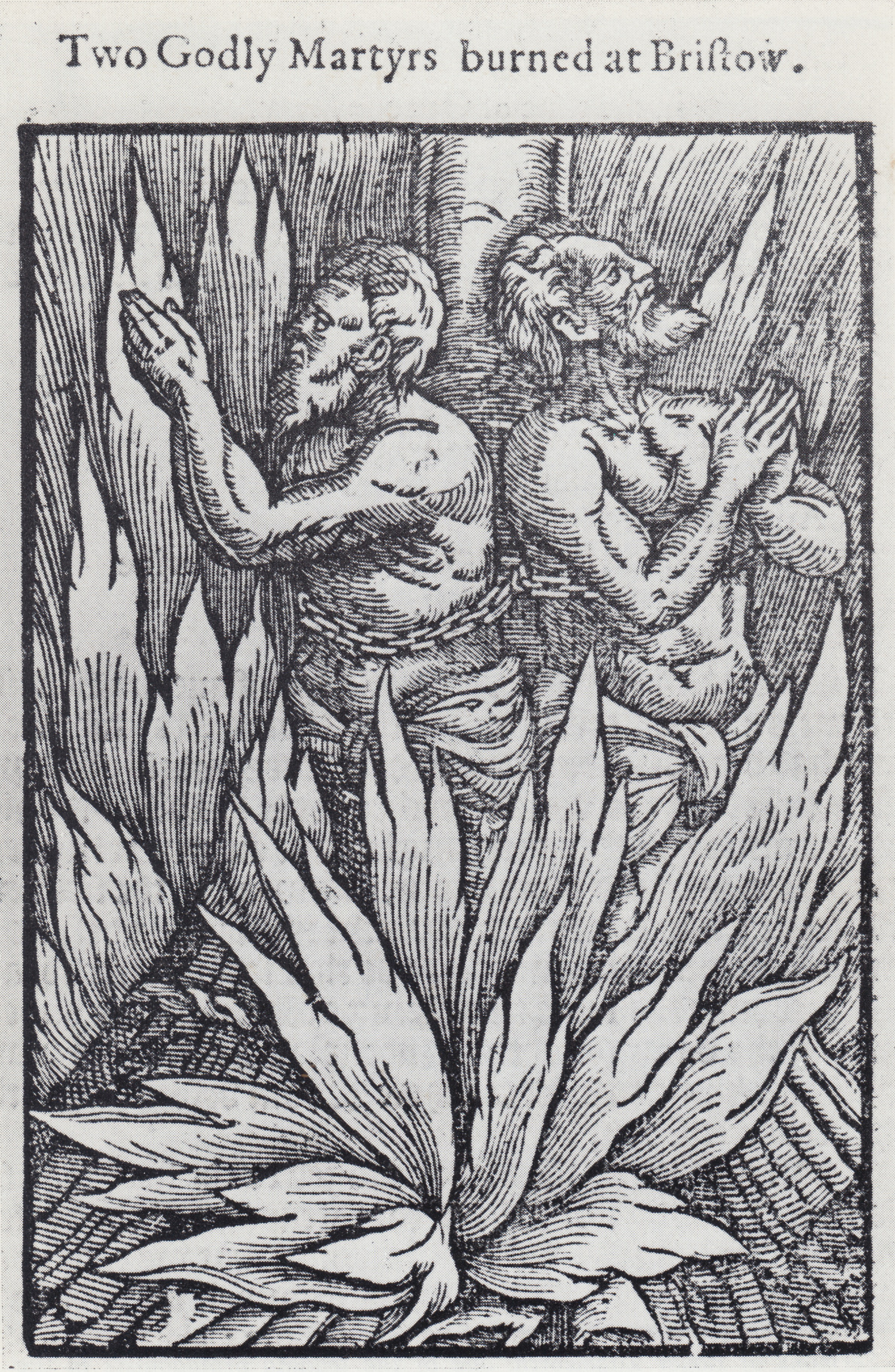
Two Godly Martyrs burned at Bristow (1557)

The cross stood in what became known as Gallow's Field at the top of St Michael's Hill, the former principal road from Bristol to Westbury-on-Trym, Henbury and Wales via the Severn ferry at Aust. This is where the Bristol's 'Marian Martyrs' were burnt in 1556-7, events described in John Foxe's Book of Martyrs (1563). The executions are memorialised in what is now Cotham Church.

Seventeenth-century references in Bristol's financial accounts include payments for 'a new double-ladder for the gallows' in 1625. This allowed the hangman to climb one ladder, while the condemned climbed the other, removing the need for a cart. In Bristol, convicts were required to walk to their execution until 1723.

On the night of 7 March 1643, during the English Civil War, the gallows was the rendezvous for the advance guard of a force directed by Prince Rupert during a plan to capture Bristol by surprise. The plan failed, however, when the Royalists in the city, who had planned to open the gates to the attackers, were betrayed.

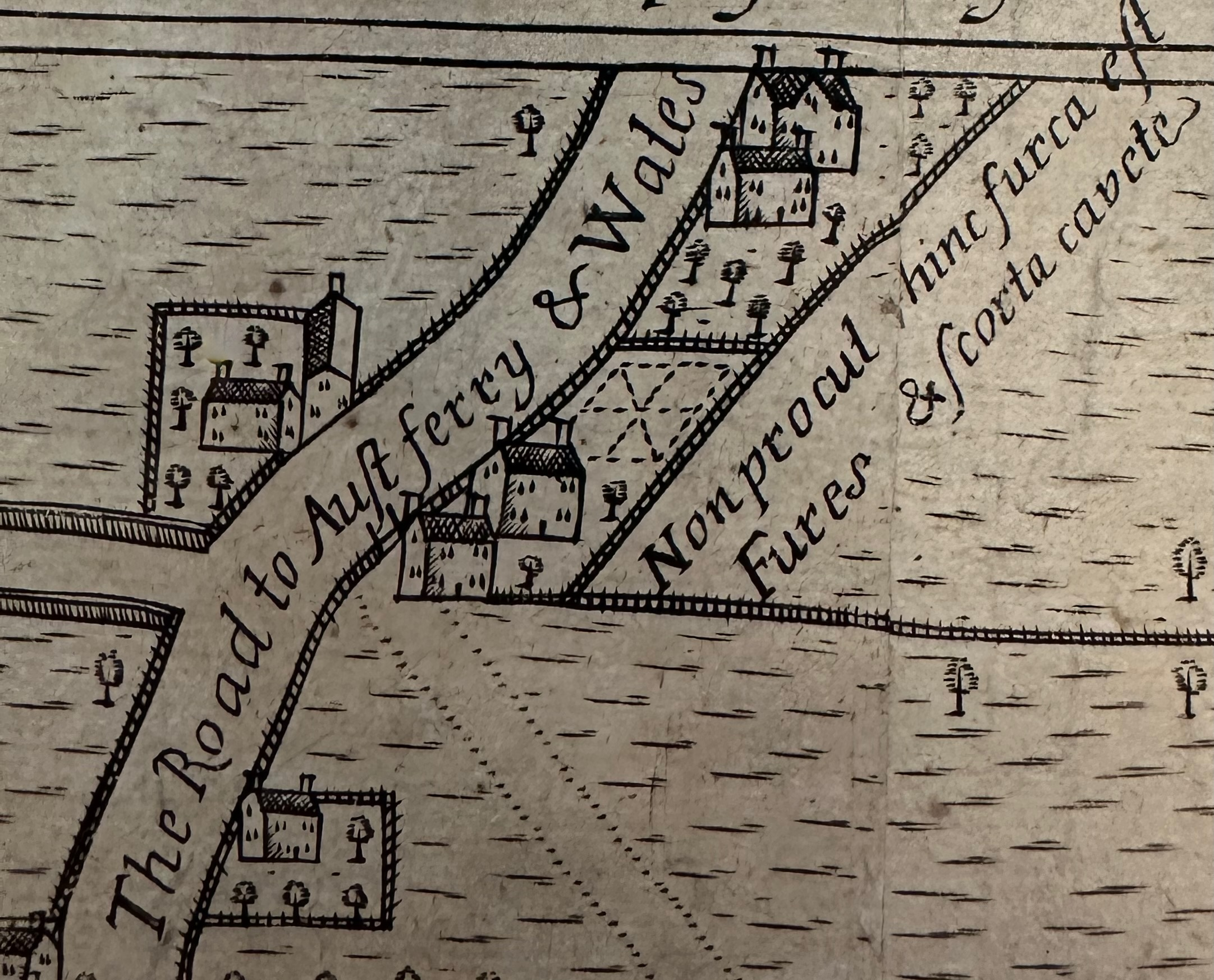
Detail from Millerd's 1673 map of the road leading up to St Michael's Hill

The fork and gallows at the top of St Michaels Hill, next to the Cross, is referred to on James Millerd's 1673 map of Bristol. St Michael's Hill is described as 'The Road to Aust Ferry and Wales'. It is accompanied by a humorous warning in Latin : 'Non procul hinc furca est. Fures & Scorta cavete'. In medieval Latin 'furca' can refer to both a fork and a gallows. This could thus be read as either a warning to travellers: 'Not far from here is a fork. Beware thieves and prostitutes!' or a warning to criminals: 'Not far from here is a gallows. Thieves and prostitutes beware!'

== Eighteenth Century ==
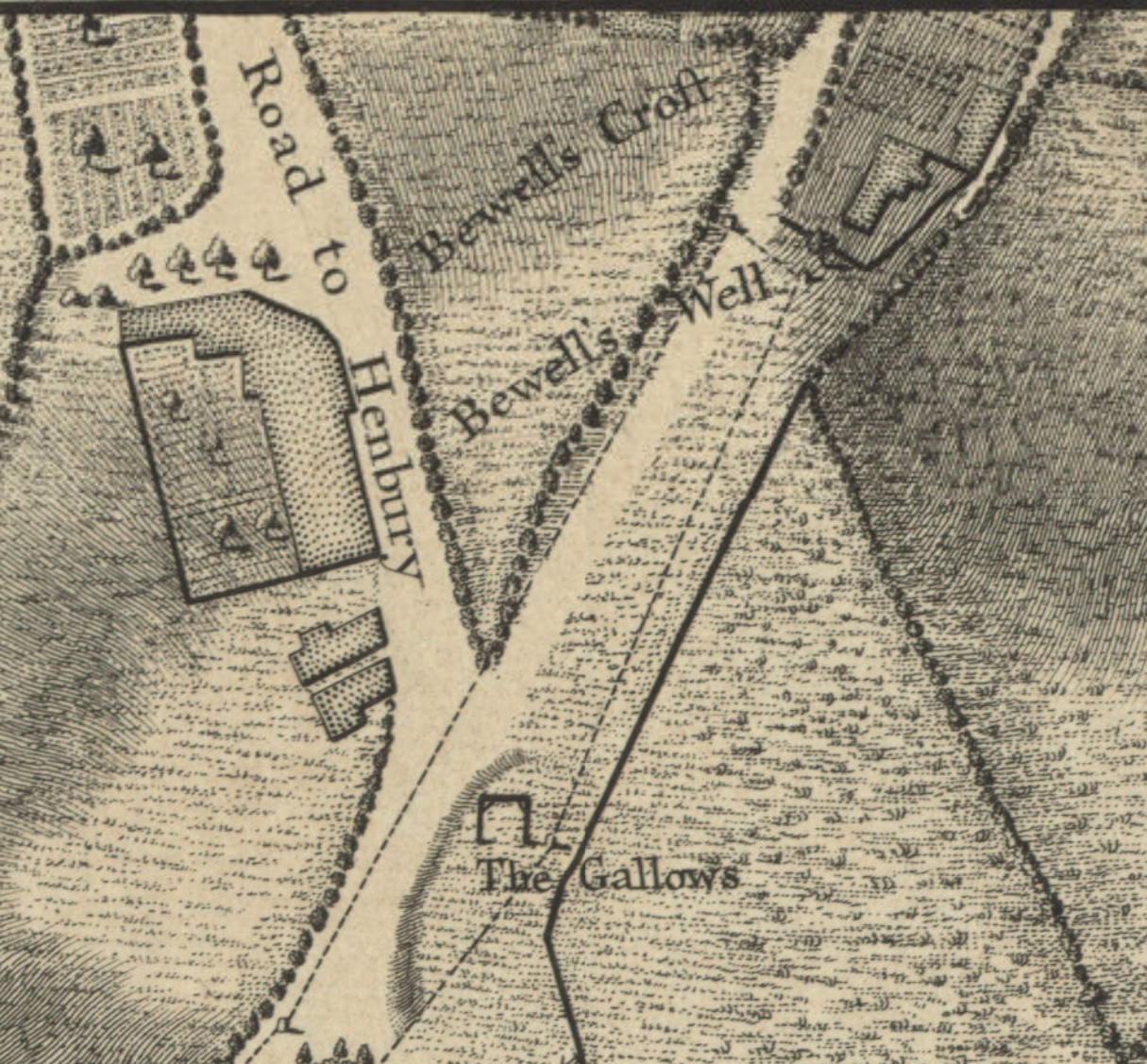
Location of the Bristol Gallows and its relationship to Bewell's Croft and Bewell's Well as depicted on Rocque's map (1743)

A 1736 survey of the county boundaries suggests the Bewell's Cross was still extant, in that it mentions a boundary stone (no. 23) 'on the High Bank, over-against the Cross'. The cross is not depicted on the 1743 map by John Rocque. However, the boundary stone is, both on Rocque's 1743 map and on early nineteenth century maps, including Ashmead's maps of 1828 and 1855. These indicate that boundary stone 23 was located in the middle of what is now Cotham Road, about fifteen metres from the junction with St Michael's Hill.

Writing in 1789, the historian, William Barrett, noted that 'Bewell or Bewell's Cross then called is that where the criminals now usually pray before their execution at St. Michael's-hill gallows.' At another point, he refers to 'Bewell in the highway to Henbury where was an old cross called Bewell's cross near St. Michael's hill'. Barrett's use of the past tense suggests that the cross had been removed, or was broken, by his time. The destruction or removal of crosses in England was very common during the seventeenth and eighteenth centuries, because they were associated with Catholicism. Even Bristol's High Cross was taken down in 1733, in response to a petition from a local that 'we are protestants, and that popery ought effectually to be guarded against in this Nation'.

Executions at this site remained common during the eighteenth century, the historian John Latimer recording the details of 138 people who were hanged there over the course of the century. He figured his list as a corrective for an earlier, less complete list, published by George Pryce. Yet Latimer did not regard his list as a full record of the executions. Latimer also observed that most of the condemned were buried in St Michael's churchyard, being recorded in the parish burial register for the church.

Public Execution was justified on the grounds that it would have a deterrent effect. However, its efficacy in this regard was unclear, with criminality occurring in the vicinity of the gallows. On 16 December 1749 the Bristol Weekly Intelligencer reported that:

We hear from Westbury on Trim near this City, that for some Time past a great Number of dissolute and disorderly Persons have been entertain'd at about seven or eight unruly Publick Houses, near the Gallows on St Michaels’ Hill; and many dangerous Insults and Robberies have been committed on the Market People, and others travelling thereabout (as suspected) by the Persons harbour’d in those Houses; — But the Gentlemen of that Parish, with a noble Resolution having bravely prosecuted and caused several Penalties to be levied on the Keepers of the Houses, so that they are all routed away, dispers'd, and gone from thence, and the Neighbourhood on that Side of the City quite freed from such unwelcome Neighbours.

== Nineteenth Century Destruction ==
The contemporary Bristol chronicler, Daniel Vickery, reported that the base of Bewell's Cross was dug up in 1829 when Cotham New Road (now Cotham Road) was laid out, cutting through the former Gallows Field.

Vickery's entry, appears to be based on a letter written by the Bristol newspaper editor and antiquarian, William Tyson. His letter is nearly identical to Vickery's chronicle, other than that Tyson goes on to say that:

'Thus associated with religious and historical events, I am quite sure, for the regard that has been recently shewn, by the constituted authorities, to the antiquities of our city, that, on their attention being called to the subject, this interesting object will be carefully preserved, and again placed as near as possible to the spot on which it has hitherto stood.'

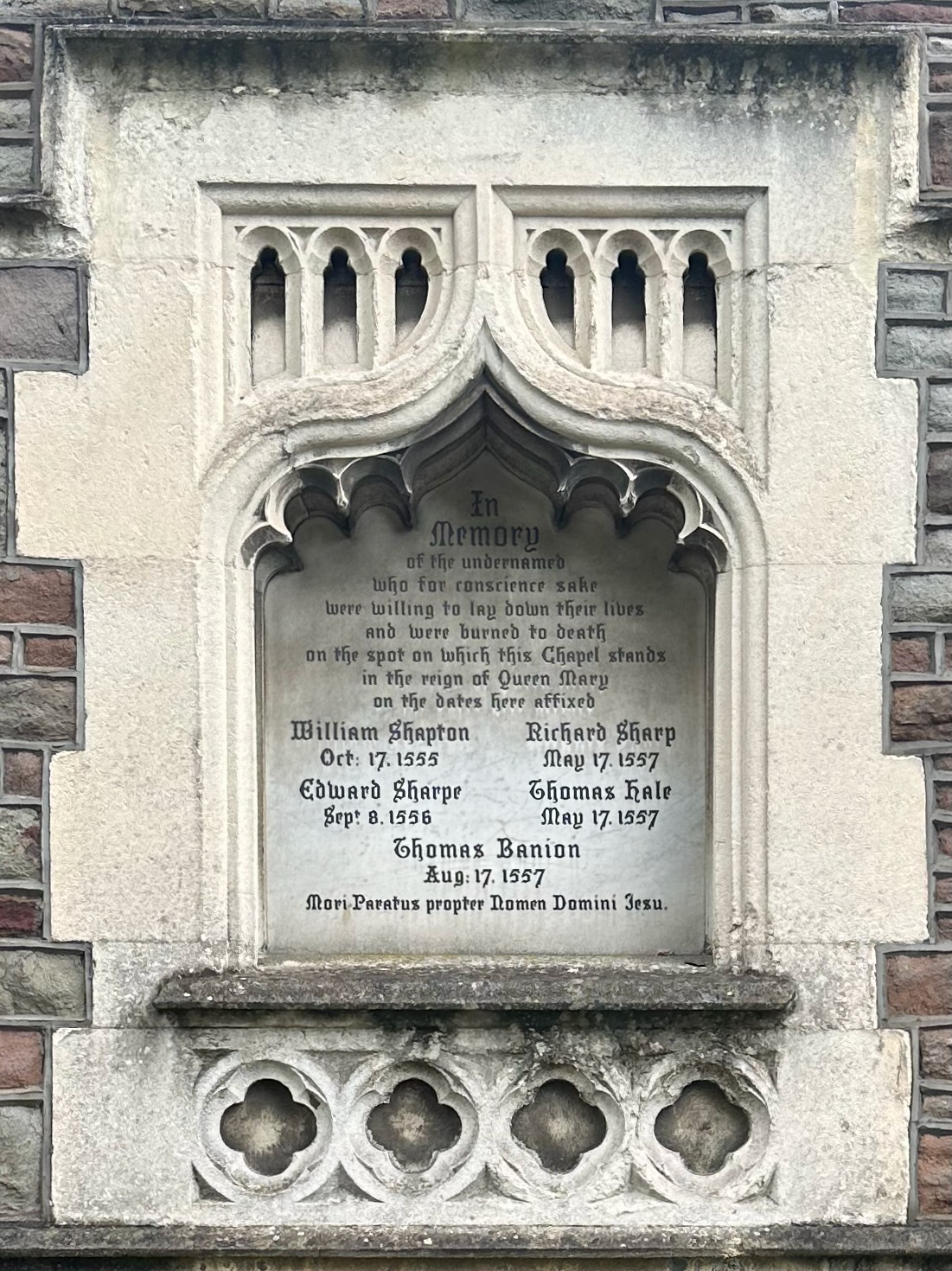
Marian martyrs memorial (exterior). Cotham Church (1892)

In the event the Cross base was not set up again. However, Vickery later recorded that stones from the cross were incorporated into the wall running along the south side of the new road. This then became part of the wall enclosing Highbury Congregational Chapel (now Cotham Church), built in 1842-3. The historian John Latimer noted Vickery's claim but was sceptical about the provenance of the stone because 'Roque's large map of the city, dated 1741, shows the cross to have stood nearly one hundred yards farther to the north-west.' This appears to be a misreading by Latimer of 'Bewell's Croft' on Rocque's map, which was the name of a field lying north west of the gallows.

The stone itself still forms part of the wall, accompanied by a late-20th century plaque claiming it to be 'a fragment of the Medieval Bewell's Cross'.

Cotham Church has two memorials to the Marian martyrs who were burnt next to the Cross. One was set up inside the chapel within a few years of it being built, while another was added to the exterior wall in 1892.
