= David Thomas (Congregationalist minister) =

Rev David Thomas
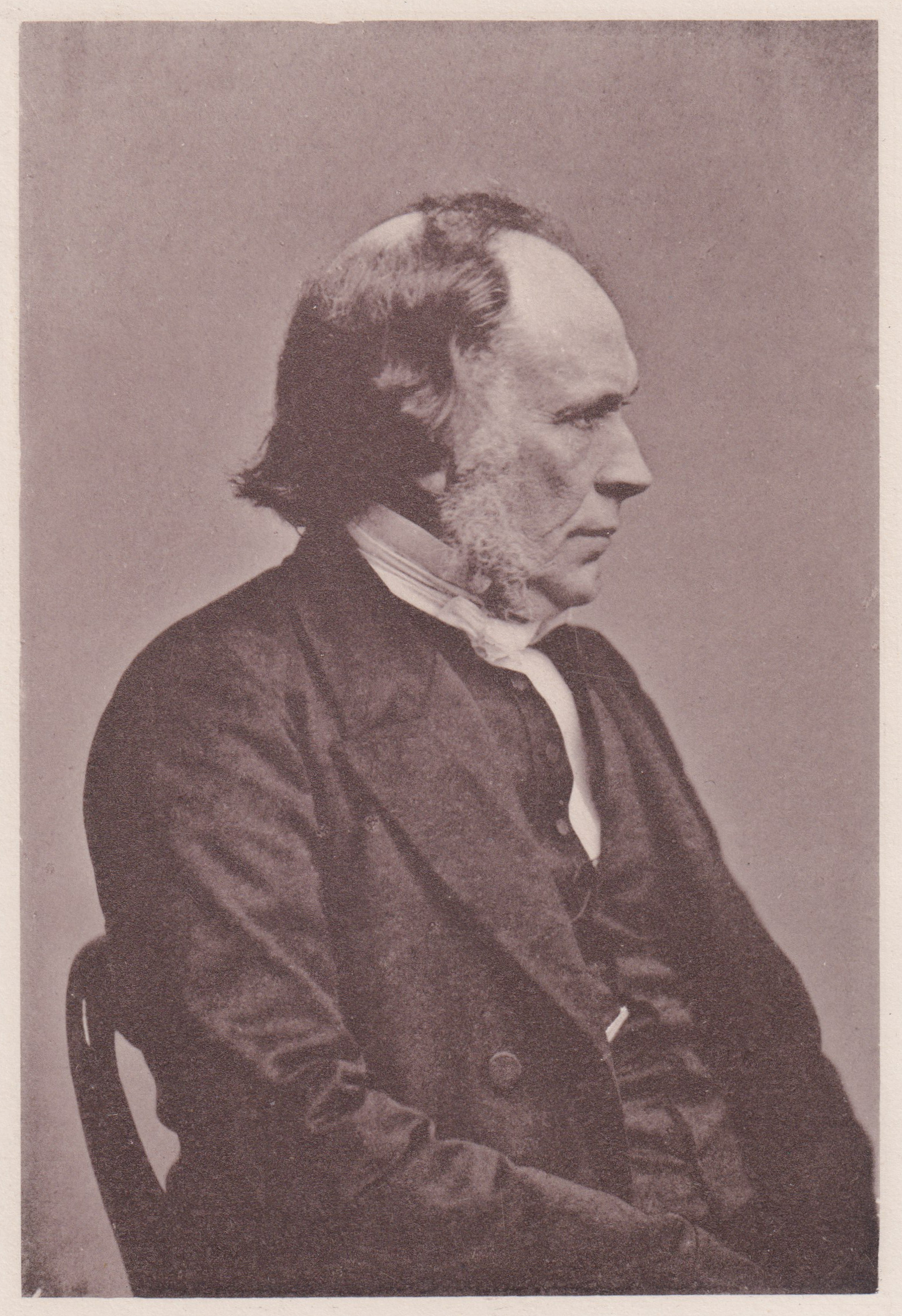
- Born: 16 August 1811; Merthyr Tydfil
- Died: 7 November 1875 (aged 64); Bristol
- Burial place: Arnos Vale Cemetery
- Monuments: David Thomas Memorial Congregational Church, Bristol
- Education: Highbury College, London; University of Glasgow
- Occupation: Congregationalist minister
- Employer(s): Highbury Chapel, Cotham, Bristol

David Thomas (1811-1876) was a Victorian Congregationalist minister, who was minister at Highbury Chapel in Cotham, Bristol from 1844 to 1875.

== Early life ==
David Thomas was born 16 August 1811, the youngest child of a haulier in Methyr Tydfil, who died when Thomas was an infant. His mother was a devout Calvinist Methodist, who took him to prayer meetings three or four times a week, inspiring in him an early interest in religion.

Thomas was educated in Methyr at a school kept by the Welsh poet and author, Taliesin Williams. He left school aged sixteen and went to work as a clerk at the headquarters of Barclays Bank in Lombard Street, London, where he stayed three years.

== Career ==
Thomas had long wished to be a minister and went to study at Highbury College, London, which was the leading nonconformist theological college in the country. After two years he proceeded to the University of Glasgow, where he obtained prizes for Logic and Moral Philosophy, before passing his BA. In January 1836, aged 24, he became minister of Zion Chapel in Bristol. In July 1836 he married Charlotte Saunders, who died of consumption within a year. Following that he lived for a time with the publisher and writer, Joseph Cottle.

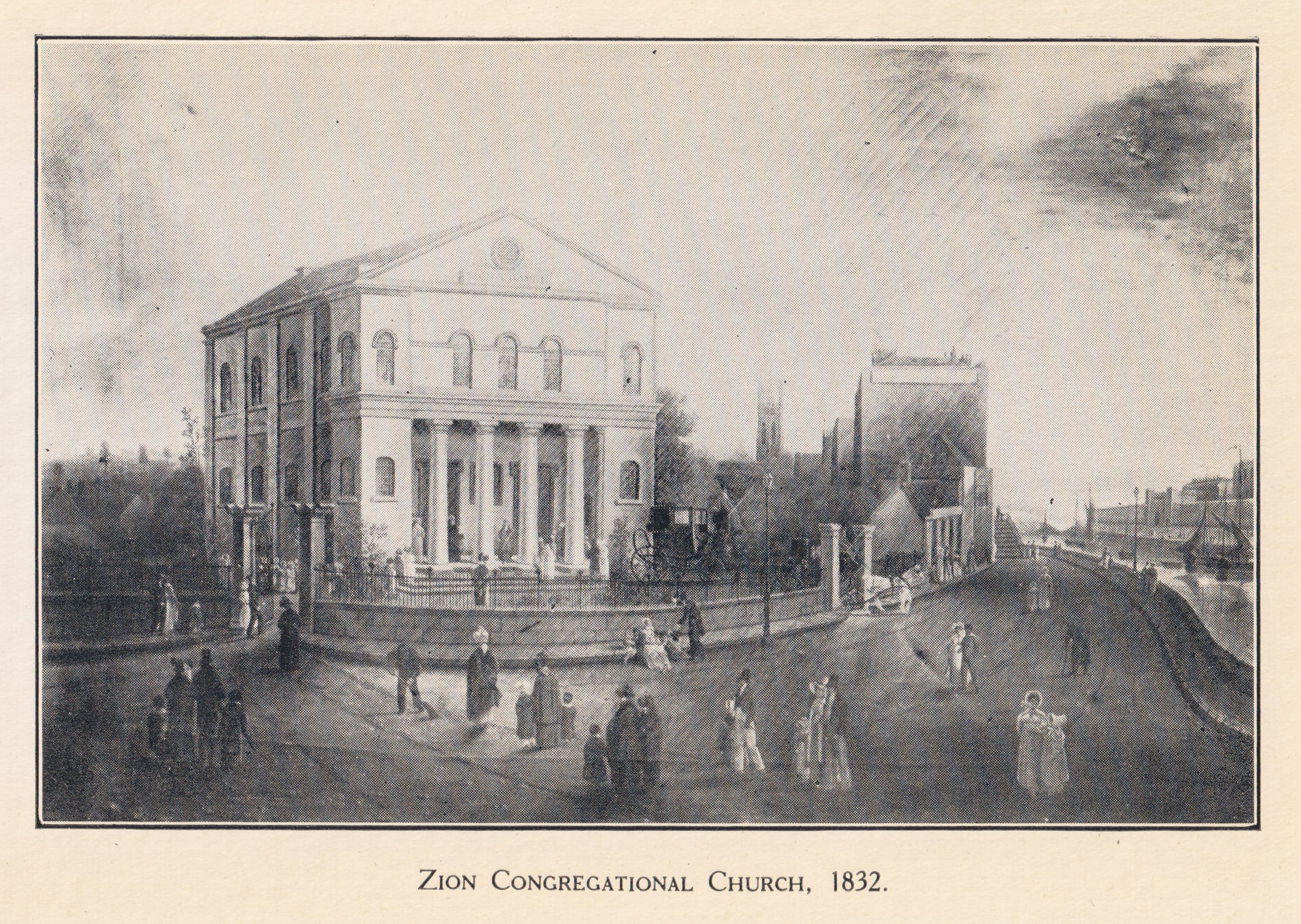
Zion Chapel, Bristol, 1832

David Thomas continued at Zion Chapel for six years, during which time he developed a considerable reputation as a preacher. In 1839 he married Eliza Leonard, their first child being born in 1841. Following a period of ill health he went with his family to Madeira in 1842-3, convalescing further in Torbay and Burnham in Somerset.

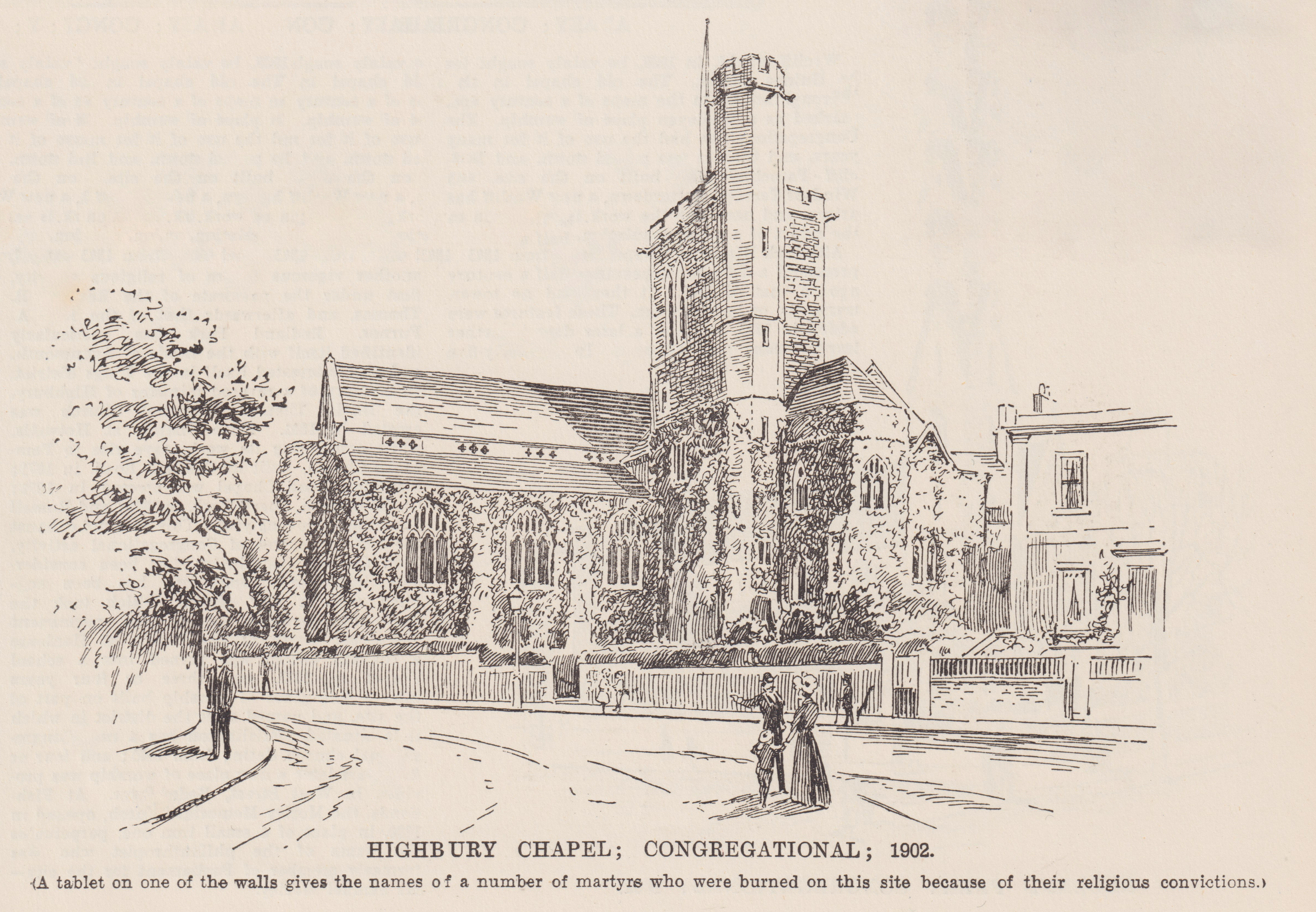
Highbury Chapel, 1902

During Thomas' absence from Bristol, Highbury Chapel in Cotham was built. He was asked to become its first minister in July 1844. He served there for the next thirty years, during which time the chapel grew in size and developed a strong reputation. At the same time he helped establish additional congregational chapels in Cotham and Redland to serve the rapidly growing population. His congregation established a chapel and school near Durdham Down in autumn 1849 and a mission chapel on Salmon Street, Kingsdown in 1860. Thomas also helped establish Redland Park Congregational Church in 1861.

In addition to his religious work, Thomas was closely involved as a liberal in the social and political life of the city, including the Women's suffrage movement.

By 1865 Thomas was regarded as 'one of the most powerful preachers of the present day.' That year he was asked to serve as Chairman of the Congregationalist Union of England and Wales. From then on he was recognised as one of the leaders of his denomination, preaching often at national meetings. His obituary in the Western Daily Press suggested that, by the time of his death, he was regarded as the Bristol's leading nonconformist minister. Thomas died on 7 November 1875, aged 64, apparently of a heart attack. His death followed bouts of ill health and a spate of family bereavements.

== Memorialisation ==
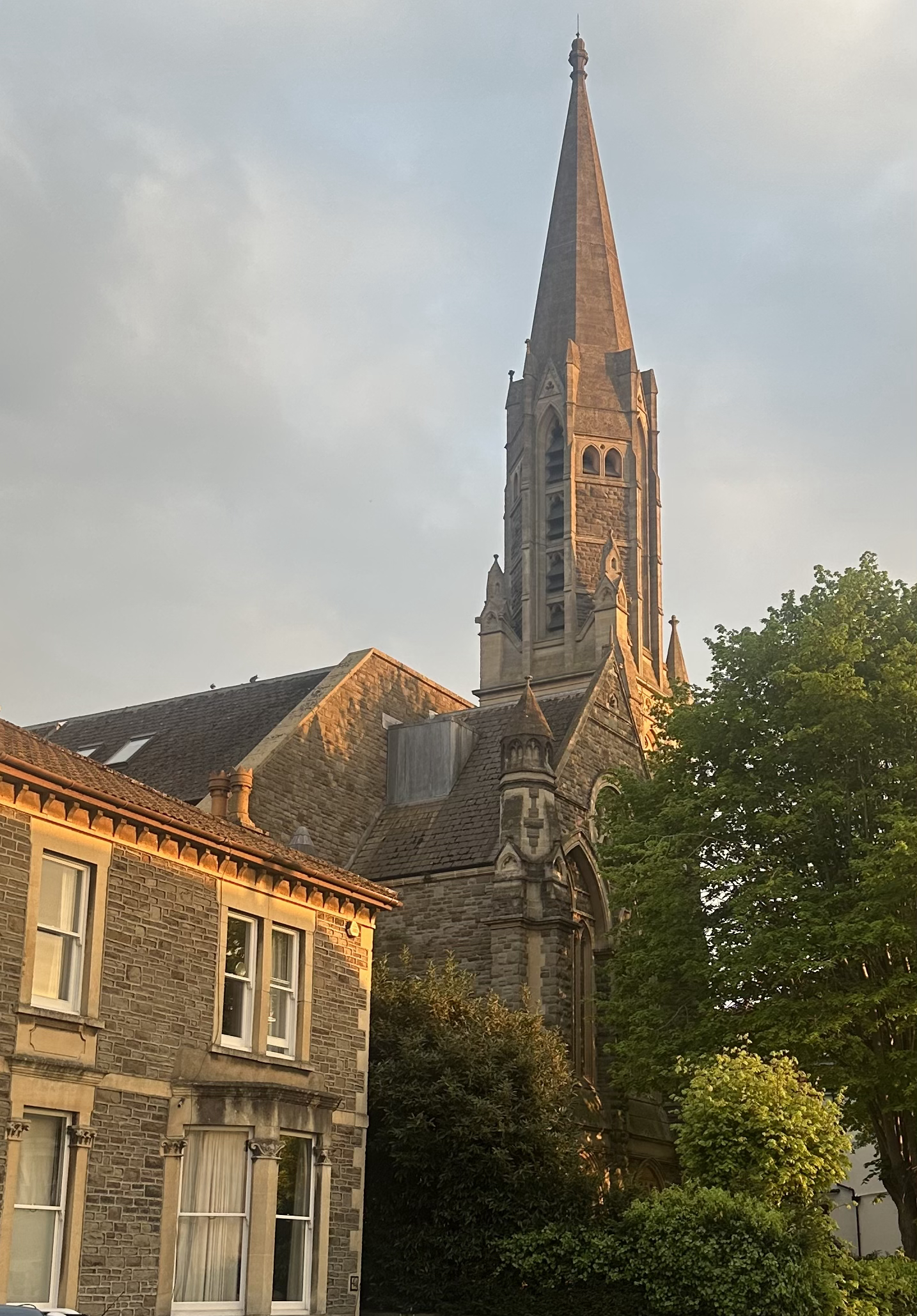
David Thomas House, Bristol incorporating David Thomas Congregational Memorial Church

After his death, Thomas' son, Arnold Thomas, published an 80-page biography of his father, followed by ten of his sermons and an appendix of obituary notices. Arnold Thomas later took on the ministry of Highbury Chapel.

On 30 March 1878 the David Thomas Memorial Congregational Church was opened in St Andrews, Bristol, in memory of the 'distinguished minister of Highbury Chapel'. Nearly the full cost of £6,300 was contributed before the opening service.

Following the closure of the church in 1988, most of the building was demolished, leaving only the tower, the facade and a small chapel intact. Behind this, a sheltered accommodation apartment block for older people, 'David Thomas House', was constructed. The church's records were deposited at Bristol Archives.

The public footpath next to the church, connecting Belmont Rd and Effingham Rd, is called 'David Thomas Lane'.
