= Newgate, Bristol =

Medieval gate in Bristol

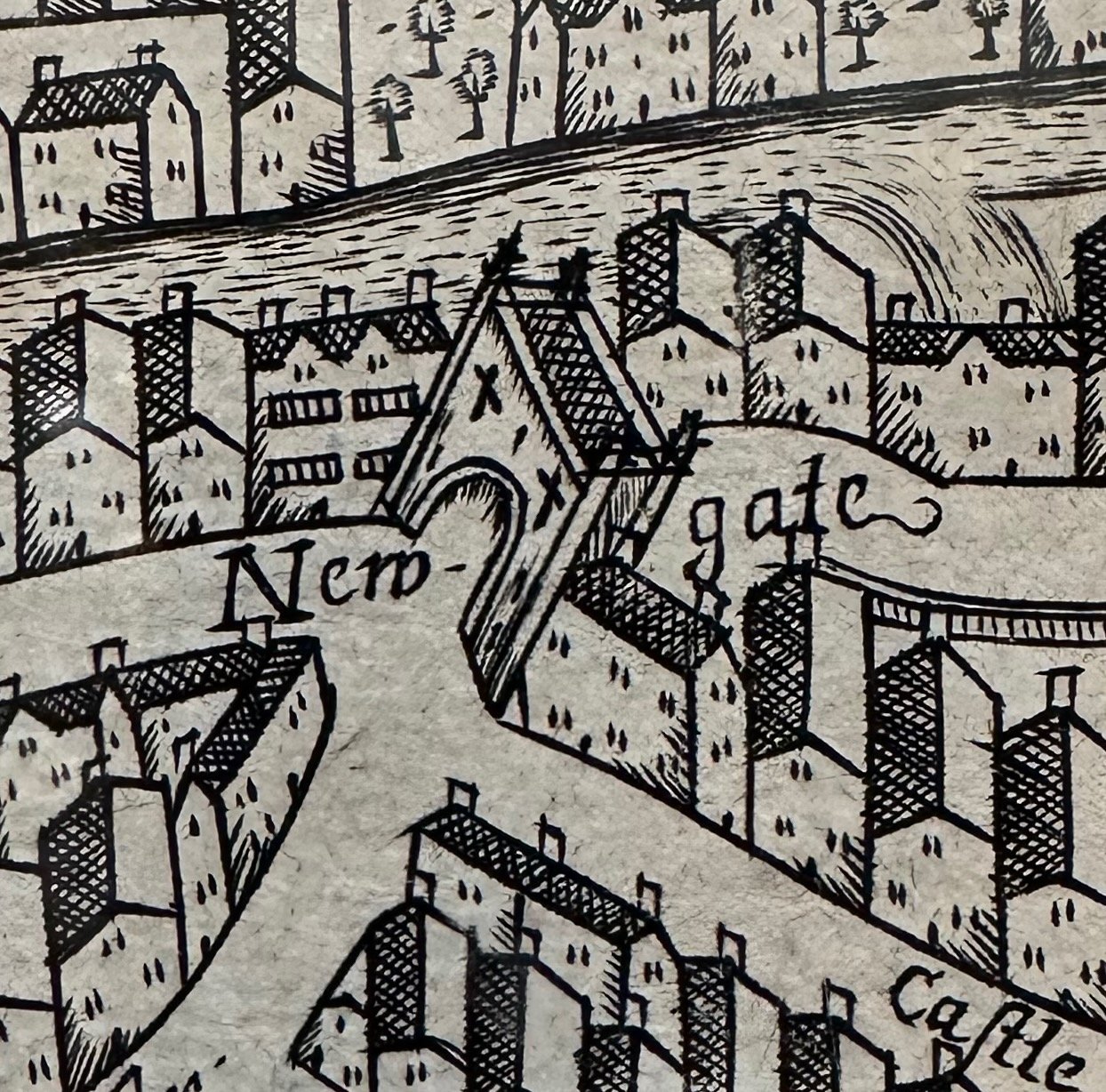
- Newgate on Millerd's 1673 map of Bristol. The large building behind the gate was the gaol.
- Interactive map of Newgate, Bristol
- 51.456057°N 2.589201°W
- Location: Newgate, Bristol

History
- Built: c.1240
- Demolished: 1820

Site notes
- Area: UK
- Owner: Bristol Corporation

Newgate in Bristol was one of the four main gates of the medieval town, demolished 1766. The name was also used to refer to the associated 'Newgate Gaol', demolished 1820. Newgate is still used as the name for the road that once ran through the gate.

== Medieval origins ==
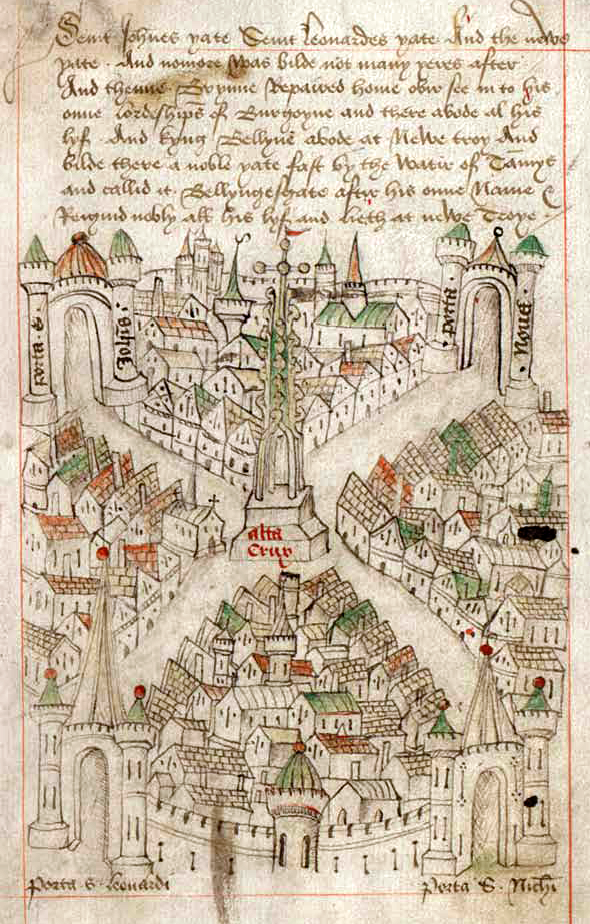
New Gate (Porta Nova), displayed top right on Ricart's 1478 map of Bristol

The earliest reference to Newgate (Novam Portam) is from the early 13th century. When Bristol was made a county in 1373, the 'gate of the same town called Neweyate' was mentioned in the perambulation that defined its boundaries. 'Neweyate' is also mentioned in an undated 14th century town ordinance intended to stop pigs wandering the streets.

In William Worcester's topographical survey of Bristol in 1480 he suggests that the Newgate was a replacement for an old gate that had now been thrown down. He reported that there was 'an extremely deep vault or strong cellar under the gate [of] Newgate'. This was presumably what was described later as 'the pit': an underground dungeon used primarily for condemned prisoners.

Newgate served as the town gaol for felons from at least the fifteenth century. It was where suspects were imprisoned prior to trial at the Guildhall and it was where those convicted of capital offences were imprisoned again prior to execution on the town gallows by Bewell's Cross on St Michael's Hill. The prison included buildings north of the gateway.

In 1461, one of Bristol's former customs officers, John Heysaunt, was charged with plotting the death of Edward IV, who had seized the throne the previous year. Heysaunt was convicted of treason, hanged and beheaded at St Michael's Hill. His head was then 'placed on Bristol’s Newgate, in full view of those travelling to and from the town, to strike terror into the hearts of all those delinquents tempted to resist the new king'. Newgate is depicted on Robert Ricart's 1478 map of the town, labeled 'Porta Nova'.

== Early Modern period ==
In 1517 a scandal arose in Bristol when it was discovered that money customarily donated for the relief of the prisoners at Newgate was being embezzled by the jailers. To ensure the prisoners were provided for, the mayor 'purchased a maintenance' (an endowment) to provide them with victuals, firewood and straw. Yet the gaol itself continued to be run as a semi-private enterprise. In 1519, Newgate gaol was 'farmed' (leased as a business) by the corporation to the 'Gaolor of Newgate' for £13 6s. 8d. per year.

When the antiquary John Leland visited Bristol c. 1540 he noted that 'Newgate (as me thinketh) is in the outer wall by the castle, and a chapel over it. It is the prison of the city.'

In the 16th century, Newgate Gaol included a den styled 'Little Ease' as a punishment cell. Prisoners were sometimes released on mass by the monarch as an act of clemency. For example, nine condemned prisoners were released during Elizabeth I's visit to Bristol in 1574.

Between the Restoration of the monarchy in 1660 and 1687 large numbers of religious dissenters, including Quakers, Baptists, Independents and Presbyterians, were imprisoned in Newgate for refusing to take an oath of loyalty to the king.

In 1688, the poor condition of Newgate Gaol led Bristol's Corporation to build a new gaol at Newgate, at a cost of £1,600. Prisoners at Newgate had to pay for their own food and drink. In the 18th century there was even a 'tap-house' or bar inside the gaol, which served both prisoners and visitors.

== 18th century ==
From 1723 the walk from Newgate to the gallows on St Michael's Hill was replaced by a ride in a cart or coach. The condemned were taken in a slow procession, 'with halters around their necks and leaning on their own coffins'. Although the gallows was only a mile away, newspaper accounts indicate the procession could take over an hour. Other forms of corporal punishment, such as whippings at the tail of a cart, could begin or end at Newgate.

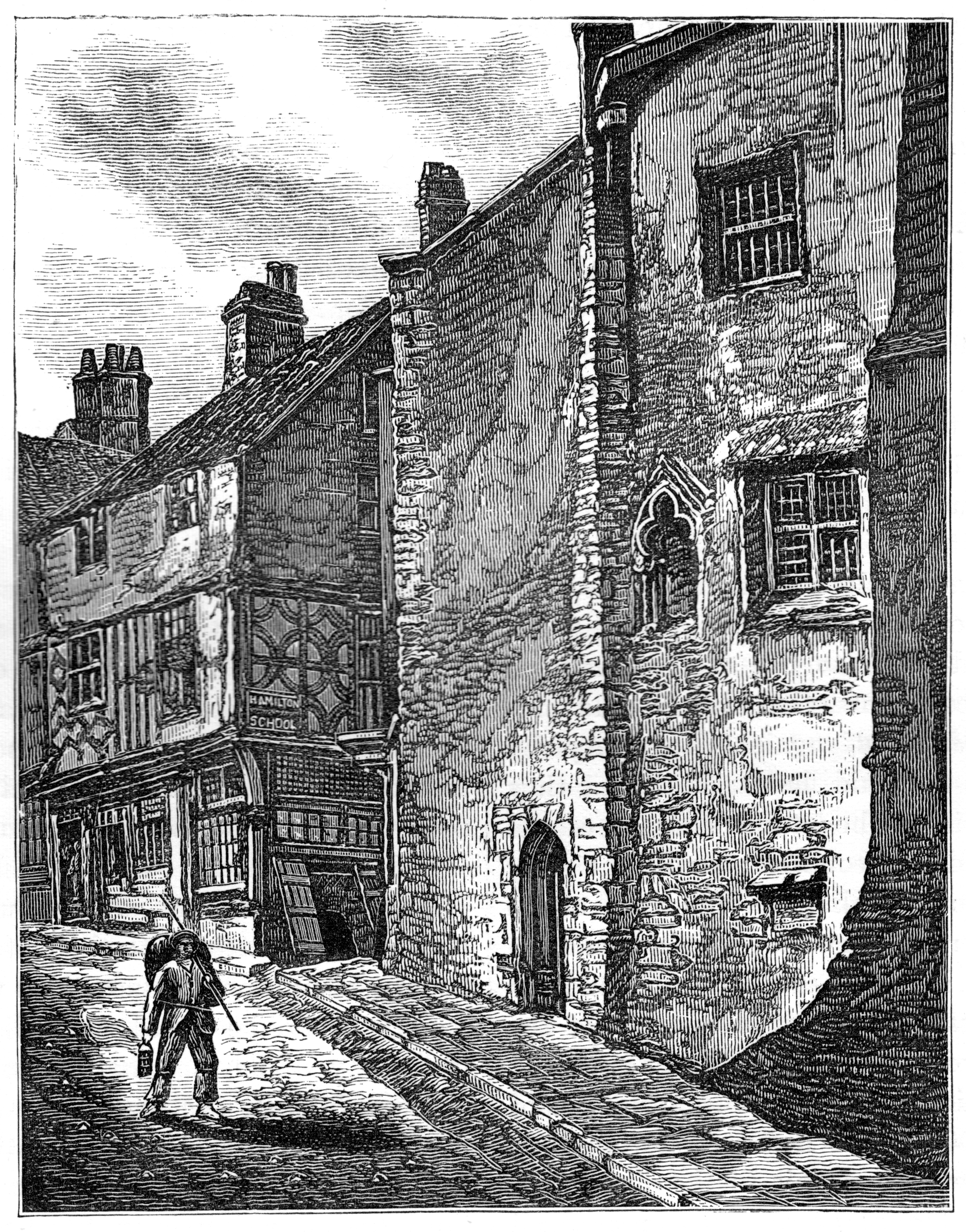
Newgate at the end of the 18th century

In July 1766, the gateway at Newgate was partially demolished to widen the road. The gate itself and two medieval statues that flanked it were removed. The statues were acquired by the Bristol brass manufacturer, William Reeve, who placed them on the inner side of the Arno's Court Triumphal Arch, which stood in front of his folly, the Black Castle. The two statues were returned to the city in 1898.

In 1770, improvements were undertaken in and around Newgate prison, in line with powers granted in the Bristol Improvement Act 1766. Despite this, when the prison reformer, John Howard, visited Bristol in 1774 he reported that Newgate prison was severely overcrowded. He noted that the "dungeon", or night room for male felons, was eighteen steps underground and only 17 feet in diameter. There were 38 felons and 58 debtors in the gaol at the time he visited, with no bedding, no employment and insufficient water.

There were some improvements as a result of Howard's campaign. However, these were largely superficial. When Howard inspected the gaol in 1787 he reported that it was 'white without and foul within; the dungeon and several rooms very dirty. The allowance still to felons only a penny loaf before trial, and a twopenny loaf (1 1/2 lb.) after conviction.'

In 1792, an act of Parliament, the Bristol Gaol Act 1792 (32 Geo. 3. c. 82) was passed to allow for the building of a new gaol. However, local opposition to the costs involved meant nothing was done.

== 19th century demolition ==
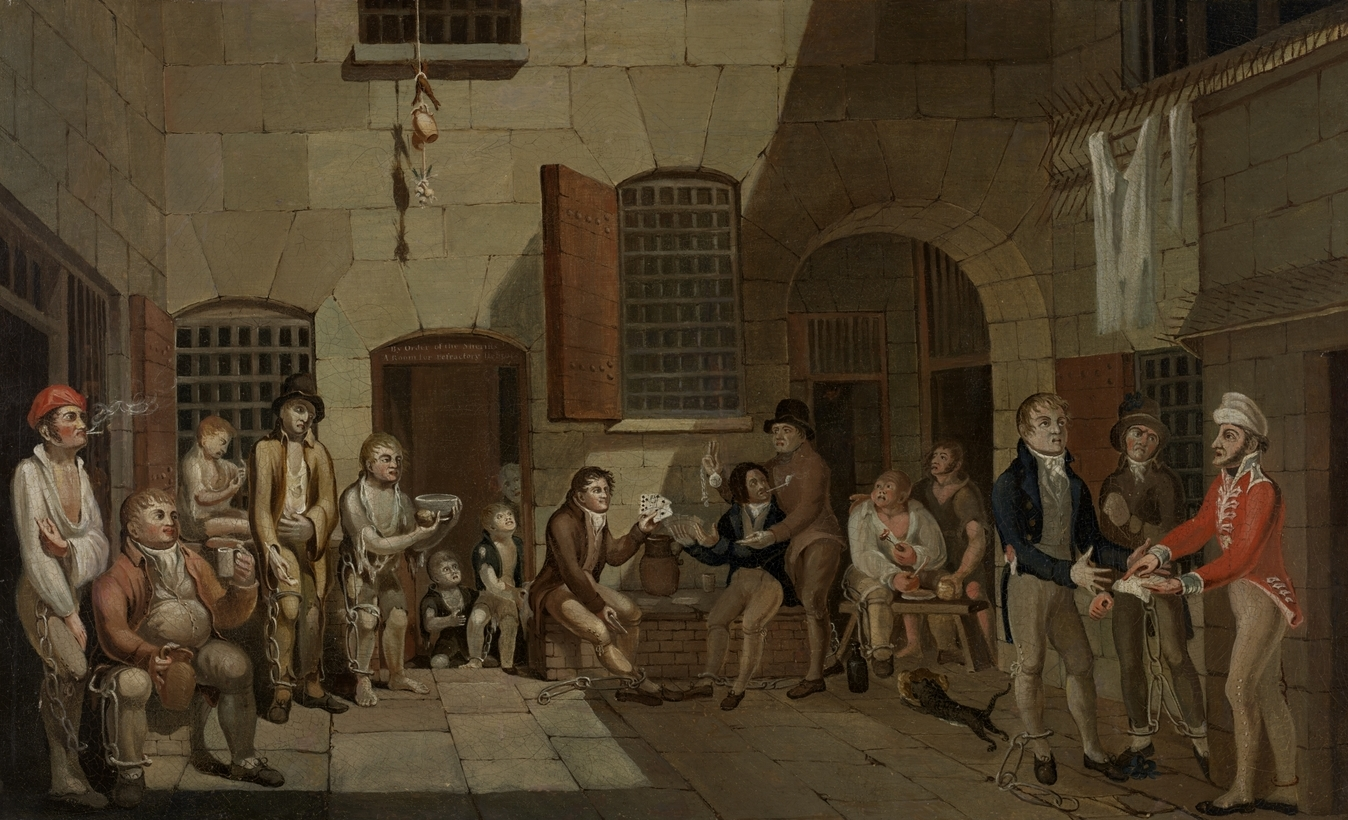
Interior of Newgate Gaol, Bristol (1812) by Francis Greenway

In June 1816, the 'shocking state' of Newgate Gaol, resulted in an act of Parliament, the Bristol Gaol Act 1816 (56 Geo. 3. c. lix) to facilitate the building of a New Gaol in Bedminster, at a cost of £60,000. This was completed in 1820, following which Newgate Gaol was demolished and the land sold off.

== 21st century reception ==
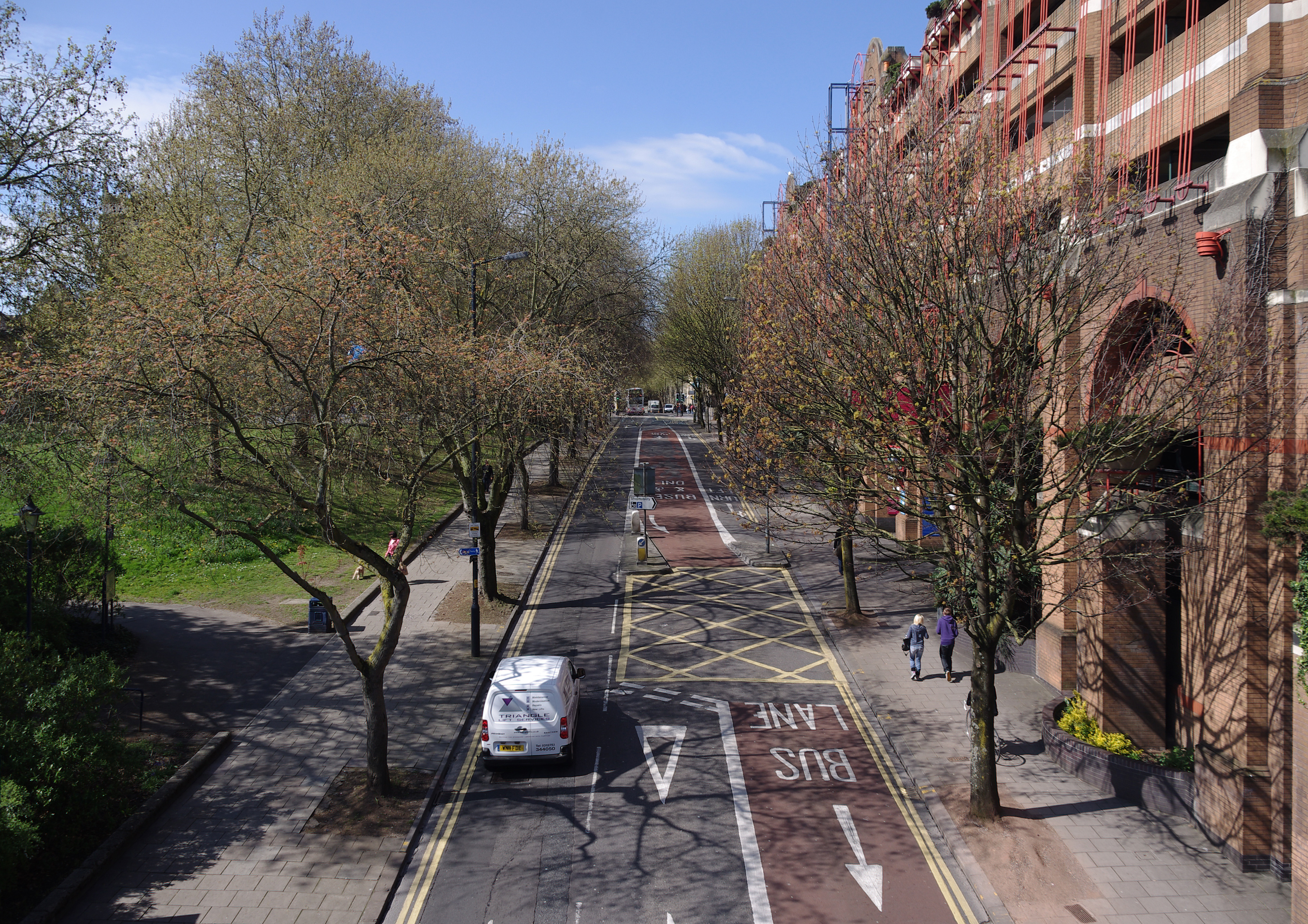
The Newgate road in April 2012, with The Galleries car park on the right

A plaque on The Galleries shopping centre, commemorates Newgate Gaol and, in particular, Francis Greenway, who was imprisoned there in 1812 and the poet, Richard Savage, who died there in 1743.

Newgate Gaol has featured in theatrical productions such as 'From Bristol to Botany Bay'.
