= St Michael on the Mount Without =

Former church, now arts venue, in Bristol, England

The Mount Without
- St Michael on the Mount Without
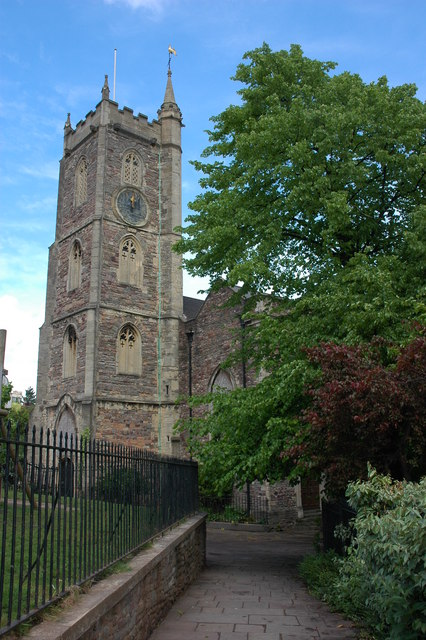

General information
- Architectural style: Perpendicular Gothic (tower); Georgian Gothic Revival (body)
- Location: Bristol, England
- Coordinates: 51.457199°N 2.598424°W
- Completed: 15th century (tower); 1777 (body)
- Cost: £3,100 (1777)

Height
- Height: 90 feet (27 m) (tower)

Design and construction
- Architect: Thomas Paty (1775 rebuild)
- Architecture firm: Quentin Alder Architects (2019 restoration)
- Designations

Listed Building – Grade II*
- Official name: Church of St Michael and attached railings
- Designated: 8 January 1958
- Reference no.: 1282109

Website
- www.themountwithout.co.uk

The Mount Without, formerly the Church of St Michael on the Mount Without, is a former church, now a creative space, on St Michael's Hill in Kingsdown, Bristol, England, near the University of Bristol. It is designated as a Grade II* listed building, and was previously placed on the Heritage at Risk Register as recently as 2021. The tower dates from the mid-15th century, while the body of the church was rebuilt in a Georgian Gothic Revival style between 1775 and 1777 to designs by Thomas Paty.

After being made redundant and closing in 1999 due to declining congregation numbers, the building fell into disrepair and was severely damaged by an arson attack in 2016 which destroyed the roof. Following a change of ownership in 2019, the church underwent extensive restoration, including the installation of a roof and the conversion of the crypt. It reopened as an events venue and creative space in 2021. The building occupies a prominent position within the St Michael's Hill and Christmas Steps Conservation Area, with the church being a principal landmark on the hillside streetscape.

== History ==
=== Early history ===
The site has been occupied by a church since the Norman era, with the original structure founded in 1147, the year Matilda ended her contest for the throne with King Stephen. As it was located outside the city walls on a hillside, it acquired the suffix "on the Mount Without". During the Middle Ages, the surrounding area on St Michael's Hill was primarily pasture and rough grazing known as Cantockescroft, with sparse settlement consisting of a few tenements and shops. Although much of the fabric was later rebuilt, the church is noted as one of only eight parish churches in Bristol to survive in its original location from the medieval period. 19th-century antiquarian sources regarded Robert Fitzhamon, founder of Tewkesbury Abbey, as the probable founder of the church. The earliest documentary reference to St Michael's occurs in 1174, when it was recorded as forming part of the fee of William FitzRobert, 2nd Earl of Gloucester, Fitzhamon's grandson. In 1193, Richard Cumblain was presented to the rectory by the abbots and convent of Tewkesbury Abbey, appearing to serve under the patronage of the Benedictine Abbot. By 1291 the church had been annexed to the Archdeaconry of Gloucester and the Deanery of Bristol.

Following the Dissolution of the Monasteries between 1536 and 1539, lands around the church that had belonged to St Mark's Hospital (see St Mark's Church) and the nearby nunnery of St Mary Magdalen were confiscated by the Crown and subsequently sold to the Bristol Corporation or granted to the newly established Bristol Cathedral. During the Marian persecutions in the mid-16th century, the top of St Michael's Hill, near the church, was used as a site for executing those accused of heresy. Tradition also holds that a 13th-century anchoress resided in an anchorage within the churchyard, the site of which was reportedly rediscovered during the 1939–1945 war. Patronage later passed to the Corporation of Bristol, which acquired the advowson by purchase in 1627.

=== Modern history ===
By the mid-18th century, Bristol's population and prosperity had grown significantly, necessitating the expansion of the church. Prior to the eventual reconstruction, the parish made several abortive attempts to expand the building to accommodate a growing congregation. In 1729, the vestry paid architect John Strahan five guineas for a proposal to add a new aisle, though this was never realised. A subsequent fundraising campaign in 1758 failed to reach its target, and a 1766 design for a north aisle by local architect James Paty was also abandoned. A survey by the architect Thomas Paty declared the old fabric "ruinous". Consequently, between May 1775 and 1777, the medieval structure was demolished and rebuilt at a cost of £3,100. The 15th-century tower, having been thoroughly repaired in 1739 was the only part retained. Construction was enabled by a subscription fund totaling £2,400, which included donations of £300 from the Bristol Corporation and £150 from the Society of Merchant Venturers. The new design featured an aisled nave, chancel, and porches to the north and south.

During the Second World War, the crypt was utilised as an air-raid shelter for local families, subdivided for different households with a capacity of 400. Following the evacuation of nearby residents due to unexploded ordnance, the church also served as a canteen for Allied forces. During the Bristol Blitz in 1941, the church was damaged by incendiary bombs. The resulting fire destroyed much of the roof, but the building was deemed safe and repairable with some services taking place while the building still lacked a roof. After the installation of a temporary roof, the church officially reopened for regular services on 13 July 1941. War damage compensation covered £9,000 of the estimated £15,000 repair bill, though work stalled in 1953 due to funding shortages. A grant of £400 from the Historic Churches Preservation Trust in 1954 helped the parish, which had already raised £3,800, to continue the work. From 1954 until 1999, the crypt was used by the Bristol Musical Comedy Club for scenery construction and storage.

==== Traditions ====
Medieval civic customs associated with the church included an annual ceremonial visit by the city authorities. In 1376 it was ordered that the mayor, sheriffs and bailiffs, following their oaths at the Guildhall and dining together on Michaelmas, should proceed in procession to St Michael's and make an offering to the patron saint.

Throughout the 20th century, the church maintained several distinct traditions. The annual distribution of Colston buns or "Tuppenny Starvers" on Easter Tuesday was based on a bequest intended to provide poor children and those residing in the nearby Colstons Almshouses with a "luxury" made of white flour, rather than the standard black bread. Conditions of the custom required the sermon to address the Deity of Christ. These buns were described as sticky and the size of dinner plates. Following the church's closure, this custom was maintained by the local primary school.

Another long-standing custom was the candlelit service on St David's Day, funded by a mid-18th century bequest from Welsh merchant Peter Davies. The service featured Welsh hymns, a practice that continued until the church's closure. Another tradition was the Patronal Festival that emulated a 14th-century procession to the church from the Bristol High Cross.

==== Dereliction and 2016 fire ====
The church faced threats of closure as early as 1968 when the Bishop's Commission on Historic Churches named it as a candidate for redundancy. In 1994, an attempt to revitalise the parish involved joining forces with St Paul's, Clifton, to form a new chaplaincy benefice for the University of Bristol. However, by 1997, the building required £30,000 in immediate repairs and had suffered from vandalism, including smashed windows. A draft pastoral scheme for redundancy was formally issued by the Church Commissioners in November 1998.

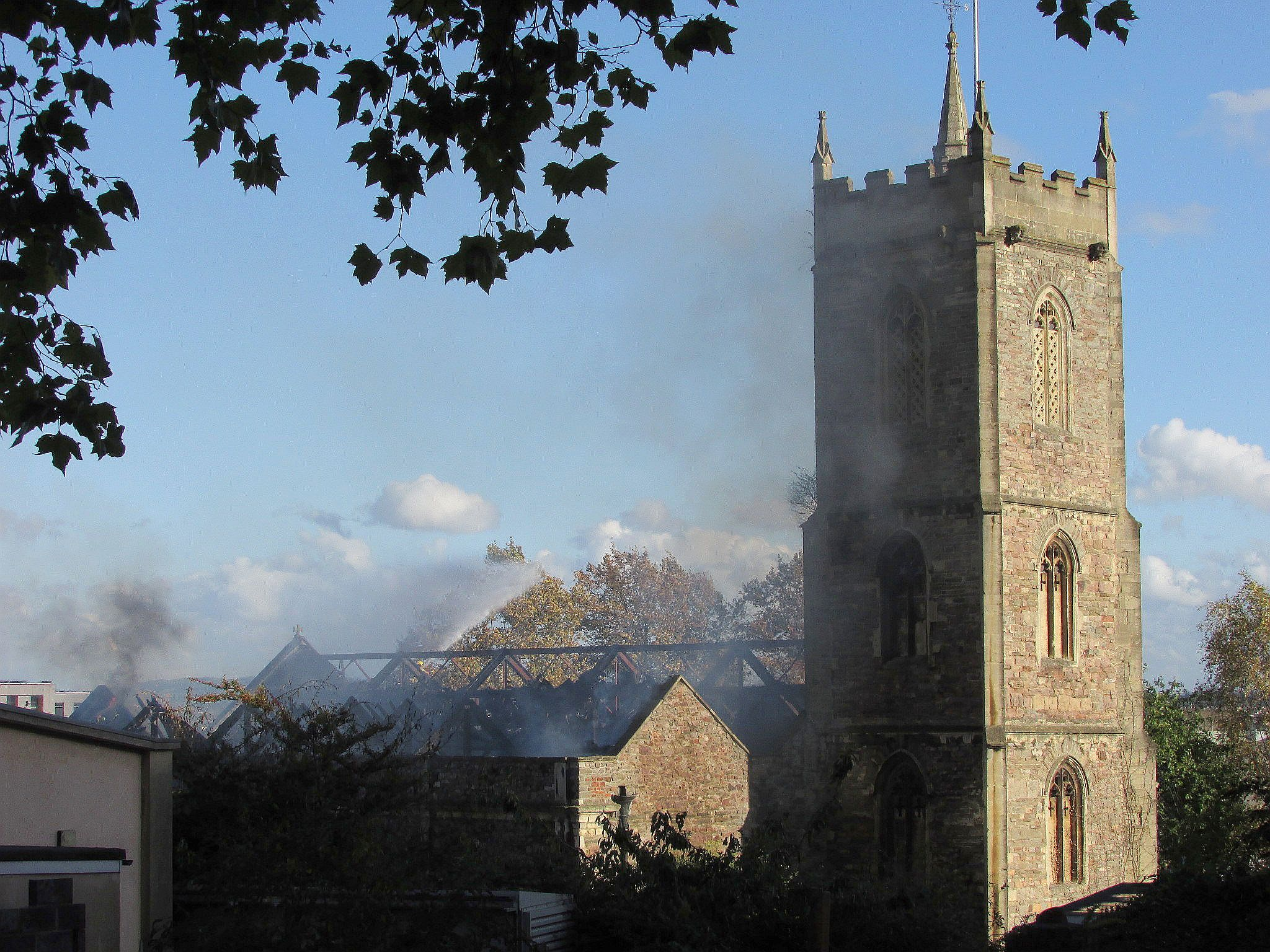
The church on fire on 16 October 2016, with the roof by this point almost completely destroyed

The church closed in 1999 due to declining attendance. For nearly two decades, the building was boarded up, with vegetation overgrowing the walls and blocking light. The Bristol Civic Society raised concerns regarding the building's deterioration and security, working with the Diocese of Bristol to find a sustainable future for the site.

A quinquennial inspection in 2013 described the redundant church as being in poor condition after prolonged under-maintenance, while noting no overriding structural concerns. It recommended priority works including clearing rainwater goods and drainage, and anticipated that bringing the building back into use would require wholesale renewal of services, including heating and electrical systems, as well as replacement of outdated toilet facilities. By 2016, scaffolding had been erected for essential maintenance on the roof and guttering.

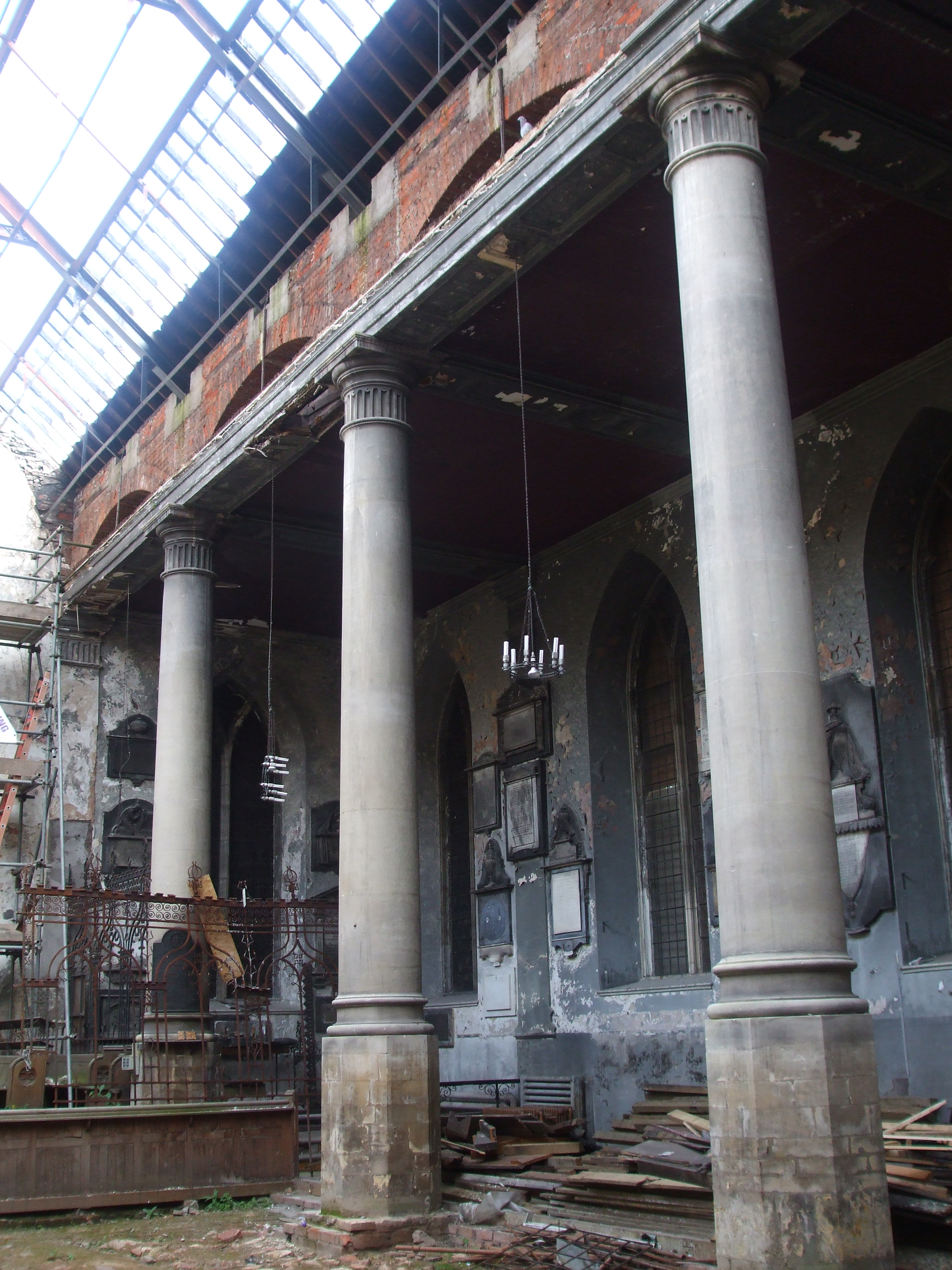
The interior of the church building during the post-fire repair work in 2019

On 16 October 2016, the building caught fire, leading to the collapse of the roof. Fifteen fire engines from Avon Fire and Rescue Service attended the blaze. The fire service determined the fire was started deliberately; later reports indicated it had been set by squatters that had entered the building by digging tunnels. The fire destroyed the main roof structure and caused significant internal damage, although monuments survived. Following the fire, the Bristol Civic Society and local residents formed an action group to save the building. In late 2017, the Diocese put the freehold up for sale. The Civic Society submitted a nominal bid of £1 but was unsuccessful in their acquisition.

Later project documentation stated that, after the 2016 fire, three years of exposure compounded the damage and contributed to extensive dry rot affecting surviving internal timber and finishes.

==== Redevelopment ====
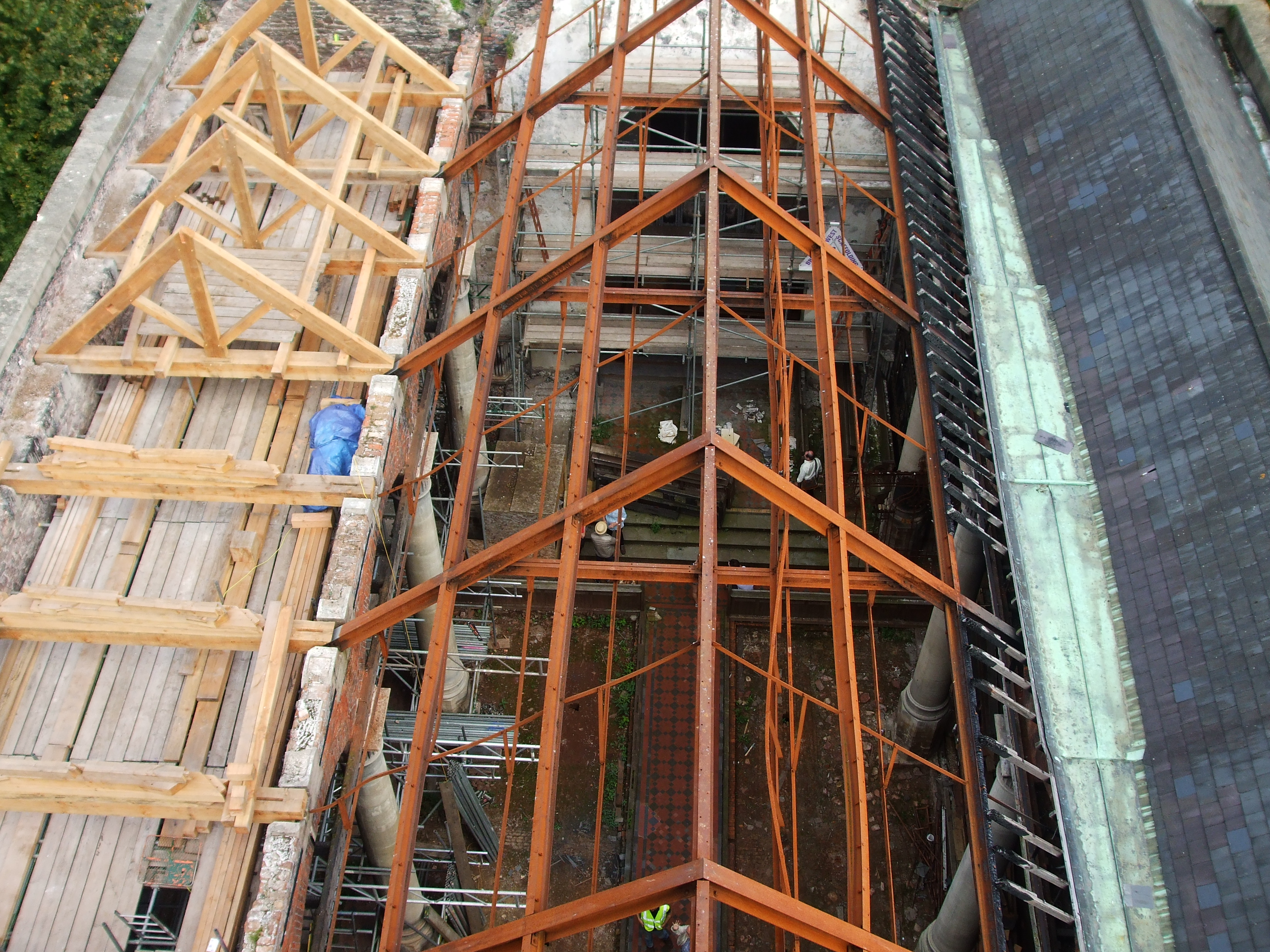
Reconstruction of the roof in September 2019

The building was acquired in 2018 by entrepreneur Ian Johnson, who proposed converting the crypt into a museum and the nave into an events space, though this specific project did not come to fruition.

In 2019, the church changed hands again and was acquired by Norman Routledge, a local businessman who had previously restored Kings Weston House. Working with conservation architecture firm Quentin Alder, Routledge began a restoration project to convert the church into a performance, weddings and events space. The approach involved direct employment of specialist tradespeople rather than a large commercial tender. This included the reconstruction of the roof using Douglas fir in a traditional king post truss design.

The renovation included the installation of a new sprung floor to accommodate dance and theatre. The crypt floor was lowered by 0.5 m (1 ft 8 in) to increase headroom, allowing for the installation of toilets, bar, office & storage. The eighteen large leaded windows were also restored on-site. As part of adaptations for performance use, proposals also included internal secondary acoustic glazing designed to follow the pattern of the existing window tracery, intended to limit disturbance from and to neighbouring buildings.

Under the directorship of Michele Midwinter (Norman Routledge business partner) the event business opened for a wedding in July 2021. It continues to operate with a licence for events, dance performances, art exhibitions, filming, shoots, dinners and weddings with a strong focus on supporting local businesses & hosting creative led events. In 2022, the restoration project was recognised with a Bristol Civic Society Design Award.

==== Theatre ====
The church is also used by the Bristol-based dance company Impermanence, co-directed by Josh Ben-Tovim and Roseanna Anderson. The Mount Without Events continues to host weddings and private events at the venue to help subsidise Impermanences programme.

In January 2025, Impermanence launched a dedicated 200-seat theatre within the nave, featuring raked seating and a sprung dance floor funded by a £165,000 fundraising campaign. The actor Mark Rylance serves as the theatre's patron.

=== Notable parishioners ===
Anne Cassteels, the great-grandmother of the author Charles Dickens, was a resident of the parish in the mid-18th century. Archives record that she was living in the parish at the time of her marriage to William Barrow on 22 May 1758, and several other members of the Cassteels (or Castell) family appear in the church's baptismal and burial registers between 1742 and 1764. The church was also the location of the marriage of Francis Greenway, the architect who would later become famous for his work in colonial Australia after being transported as a convict. He married Mary Moore at St Michael's when he was 31 years old. The church also counts the 15th-century scholar John Free among its former rectors, who was appointed in 1464 and a celebrated humanist who taught at universities abroad. H was named Bishop of Bath by Pope Paul II but died in Rome before he could be consecrated.

== Architecture and fittings ==
=== Exterior ===
The church stands on a terraced plot at the junction of St Michael's Hill and Church Lane, aligned roughly north-east to south-west. The site is level within its boundary but sits within the steep topography of St Michael's Hill, which rises sharply from Lewin's Mead; a benchmark at the north-west corner of the building records a height of 45.07 m above Ordnance Datum.

The building consists of a medieval tower attached to a Georgian Gothic Revival body. The four-stage tower, constructed in the mid-15th century, is built of Pennant rubble with diagonal buttresses and a crenellated parapet. It features a southeast stair turret topped by a spirelet, on which there is a gilded weather vane. According to 19th-century descriptions, the tower was probably added after the construction of the original church. It was suggested that corbels within the belfry were intended to represent Edward III and his queen, Philippa, although their features were already heavily eroded by the early 19th century. These details went on to be cited as evidence for a 14th-century date for the tower. After a gargoyle fell from the tower and damaged the roof in 1966, restoration work included the installation of two new stone heads depicted as likenesses of the incumbent vicar, Frederick C. Vyvyan-Jones, and his predecessor, John Clay.

The main body of the church, rebuilt between 1775 and 1777, is constructed of Pennant rubble with limestone dressings. The nave roof, which sits below a low parapet, historically used clay double-Roman tiles, while the north and south aisles, chancel and vestry were slate-roofed. The building forms a rectangle measuring approximately 77 feet (23 m) in length by 62 feet (19 m) in width, with an aisled nave and chancel with north and south porches. The exterior bays are defined by windows featuring two-centred arches with hood mouldings, each divided into two trefoil-headed lights. On the west front, the windows are combined with doorways topped by an ogee head. During the repairs of the church after damage in the Bristol Blitz, work undertaken included replacing the nave roof structure with steel members, and reinstating the barrel-vaulted ceiling using plaster on expanded metal lath formed to the curve of the vault; the nave roof covering was also changed to double-Roman tiles during this post-war reconstruction. As part of the 2016 redevelopment, the churchyard was landscaped by landscape designer Flavia Goldsworthy to include three new gardens that incorporate existing tombstones and materials.

=== Interior ===
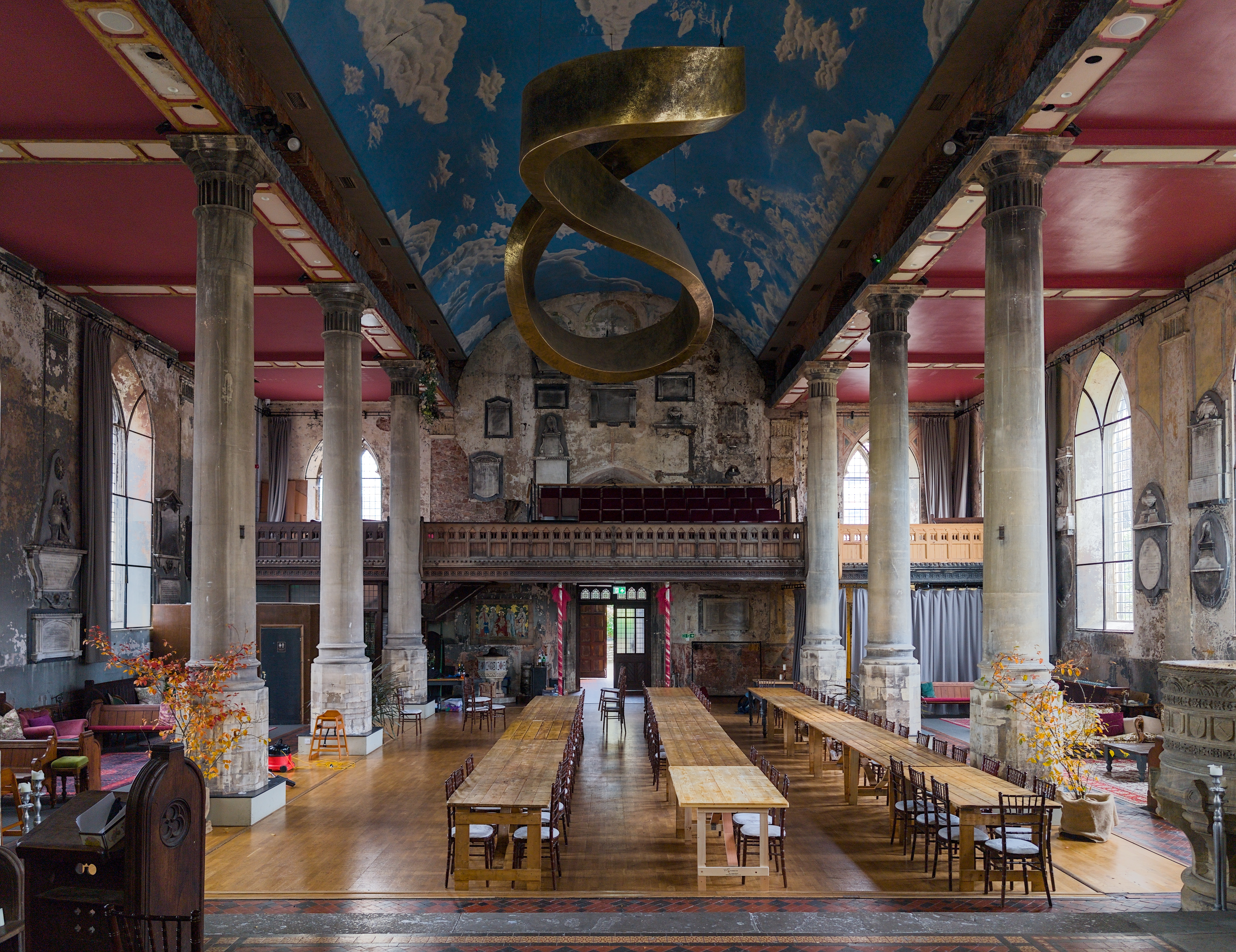
Interior of the building after redevelopment, looking east-to-west from the chancel

The interior of the church had been described by Gomme as a "Georgian preaching room". The five-bay nave arcade consists of columns with fluted capitals, separating the nave from the flat-ceilinged aisles. The five-bay nave arcade consists of stone columns raised on octagonal pedestals that were originally the height of the box pews. These columns support a longitudinal trabeation (beam) rather than arches; the soffits of these beams are decorated with sunk Gothic panels. The nave itself is covered by a plaster wagon roof; originally plain, the ceiling of the nave was repainted during the renovation to depict a sky with swirling clouds. The church housed an organ built in 1939 by W. G. Vowles. After deconsecration, it was moved to St Mary's Collegiate Church, Youghal.

Many other internal fittings were stripped out following deconsecration, leaving a reduced set of furnishings on site by the early 2010s. A 2013 inspection recorded that most nave pews had been removed, while a smaller number of pews and frontals remained, along with two sets of choir stalls, a wrought-iron lectern, a stone pulpit and altar tables. The raised chancel, or dais, has steps with York-stone treads and decorative tiled risers, with the stone pulpit historically set on the dais steps beside the easternmost column.

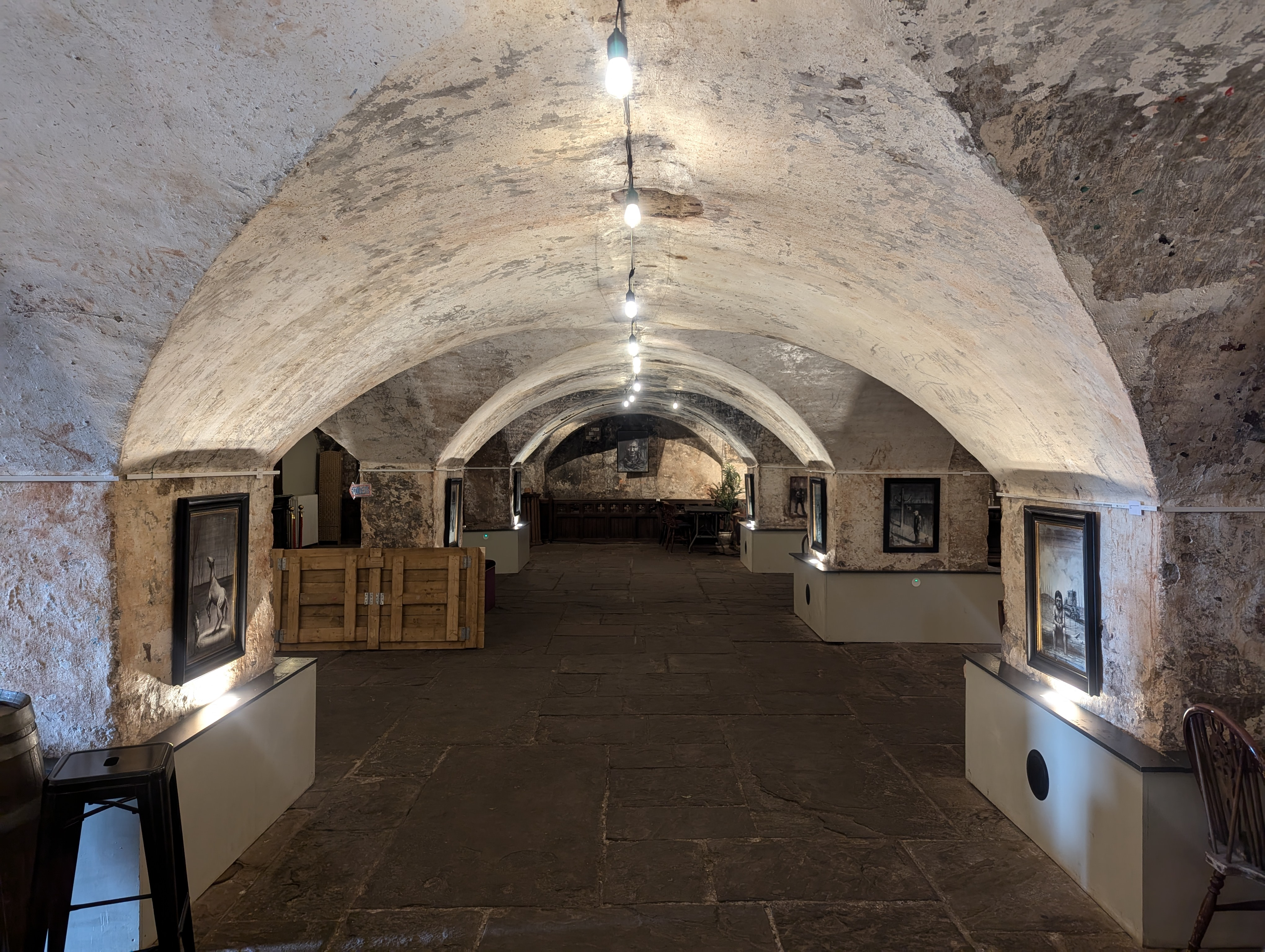
The crypt of the building, shown here being used as a temporary art gallery

A large aluminium sculpture, shaped as a lemniscate, currently hangs from this ceiling and was produced Backwell Designs. The crypt has been converted into a bar and event space. During lowering of its floor, stonemasons and archaeologists had to lift and relay the existing tombs in their original relative positions. There is a mezzanine on the west side of the building, with a height of 3.5 m (11 ft 6 in), paved with Hawksley's Patent Step of Joseph Westwood & Co.

==== Monuments and fittings ====
Numerous medieval monuments, inscriptions, and painted glass were removed or destroyed prior to the late 18th-century rebuilding. These included figures in stained glass and inscriptions formerly located in the east window above the communion table, which had already disappeared by the time of later surveys. Today, the church retains several historical fittings of later date, including a 17th-century sword rest (partly dated to 1683) and a 19th-century circular carved-stone pulpit. In 2024, listed-building proposals were brought forward to improve the usability of the stage area, including repositioning the pulpit to its present location and modifying the timber choir pews and platforms to create a clearer level performance surface; other pews were proposed to be adapted as freestanding to allow more flexible layouts for events. The octagonal font, featuring marble shafts, was installed in 1886, replacing an earlier 1775 urn by Paty. The church also houses significant memorials to the 6th Battalion, Gloucestershire Regiment. In 1949, First World War memorial boards with names of 842 soldiers of the 6th Battalion were moved to the church from the Old Market Street drill hall after bombing. These were rediscovered in the crypt following the 2016 fire, whereupon they were rededicated in 2021. Other memorials include: a wall monument to Joseph Percivall (died 1764), signed by J. Walsh, featuring three classical female figures; a monument to Mary Stretton by William Paty; a mosaic by James Powell of London depicting Christ blessing children, installed in 1905 as a memorial to Mary Caroline Tyndall of the nearby Royal Fort.

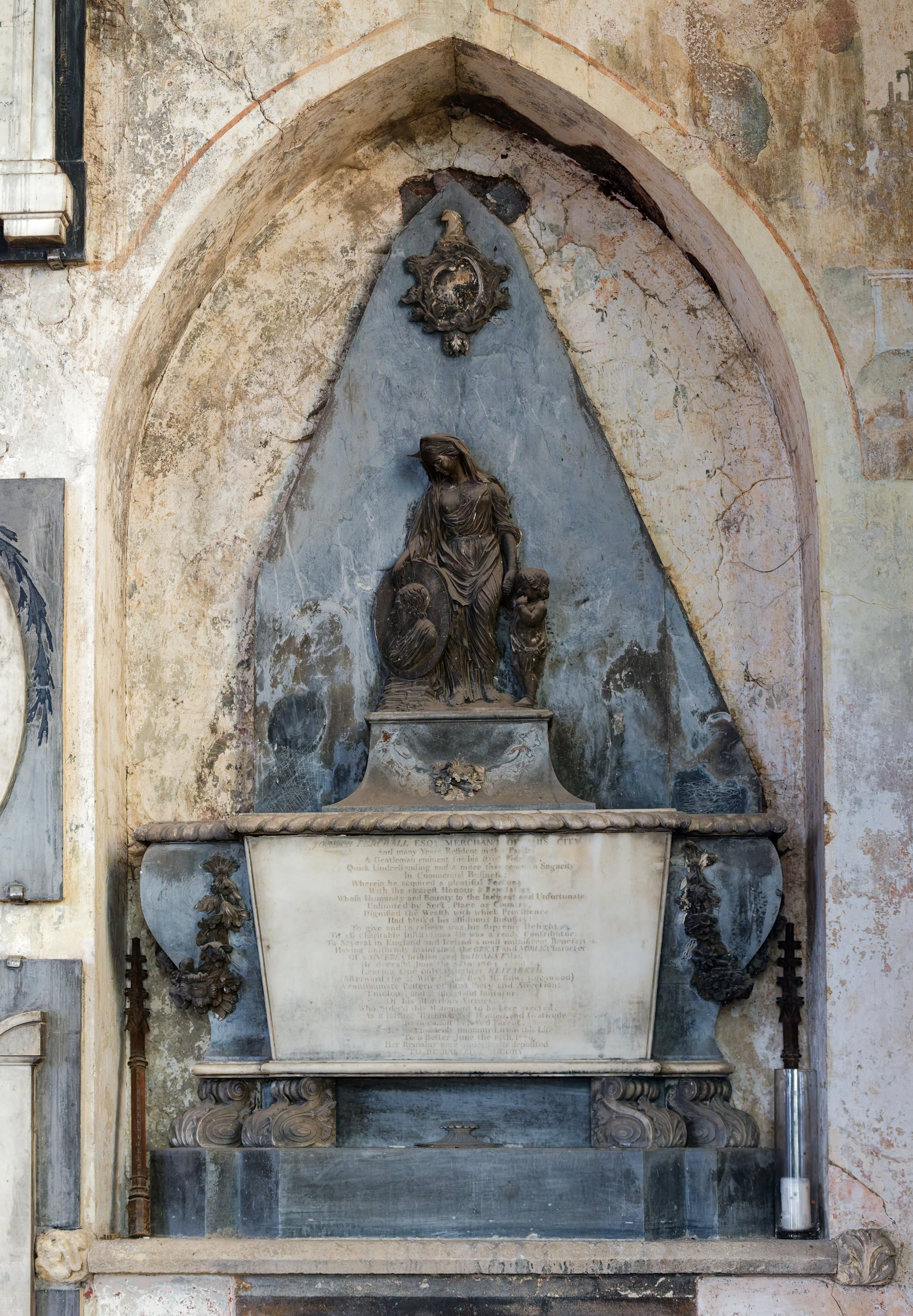
Monument to Joseph Percivall, J. Walsh

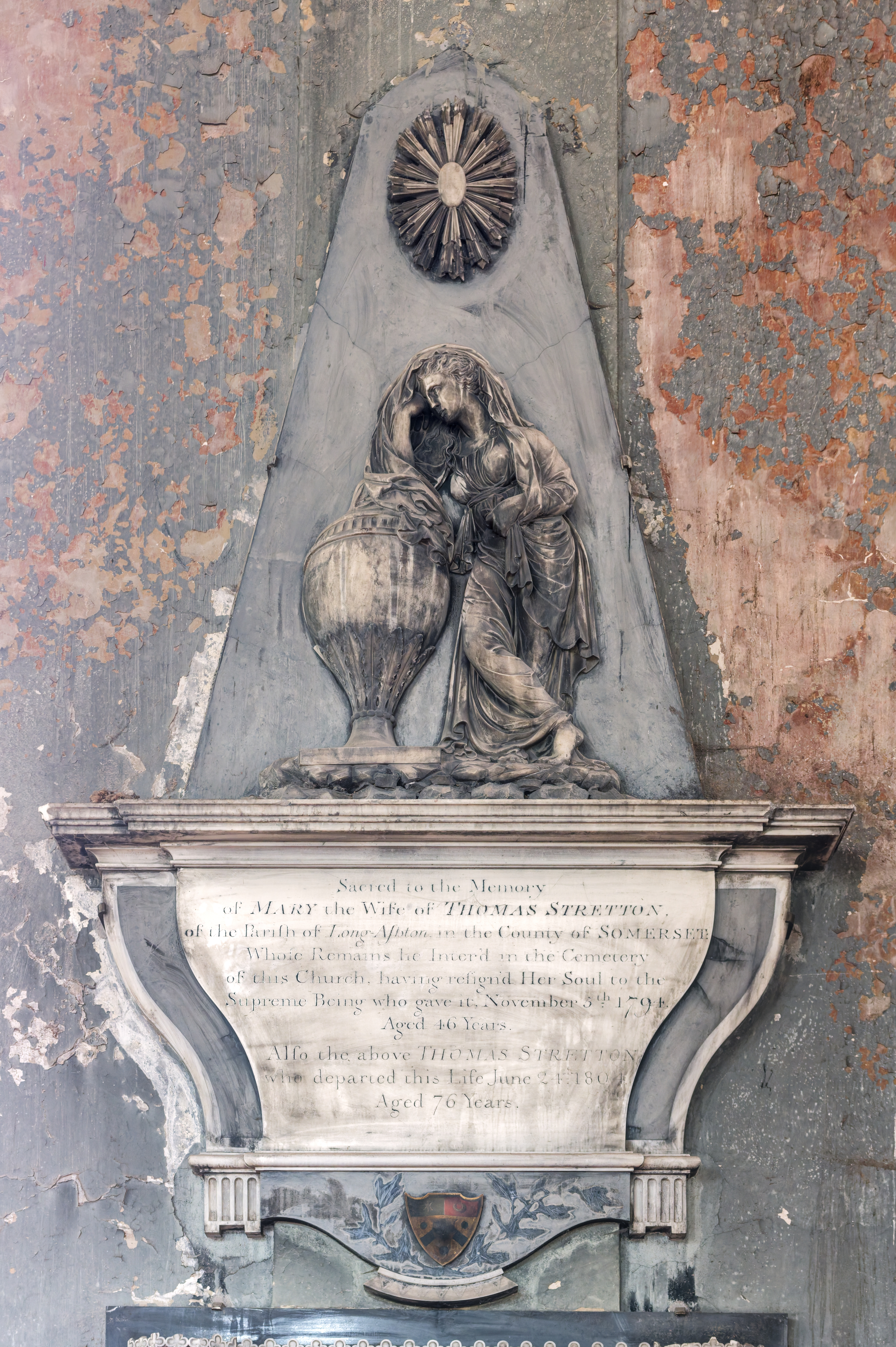
Monument to Mary Stretton, William Paty

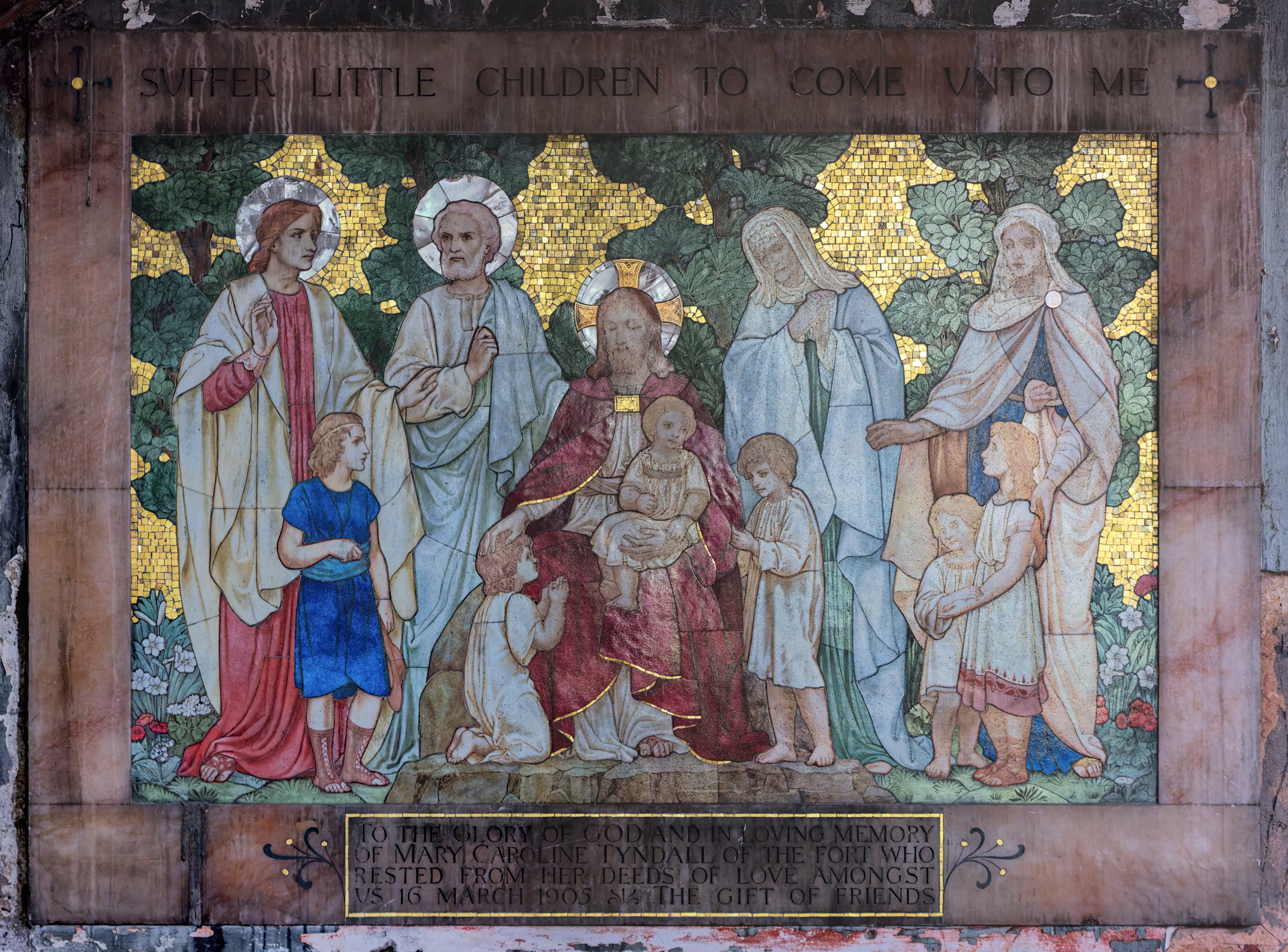
Mary Caroline Tyndall memorial mosaic, J. C. Powell, 1905

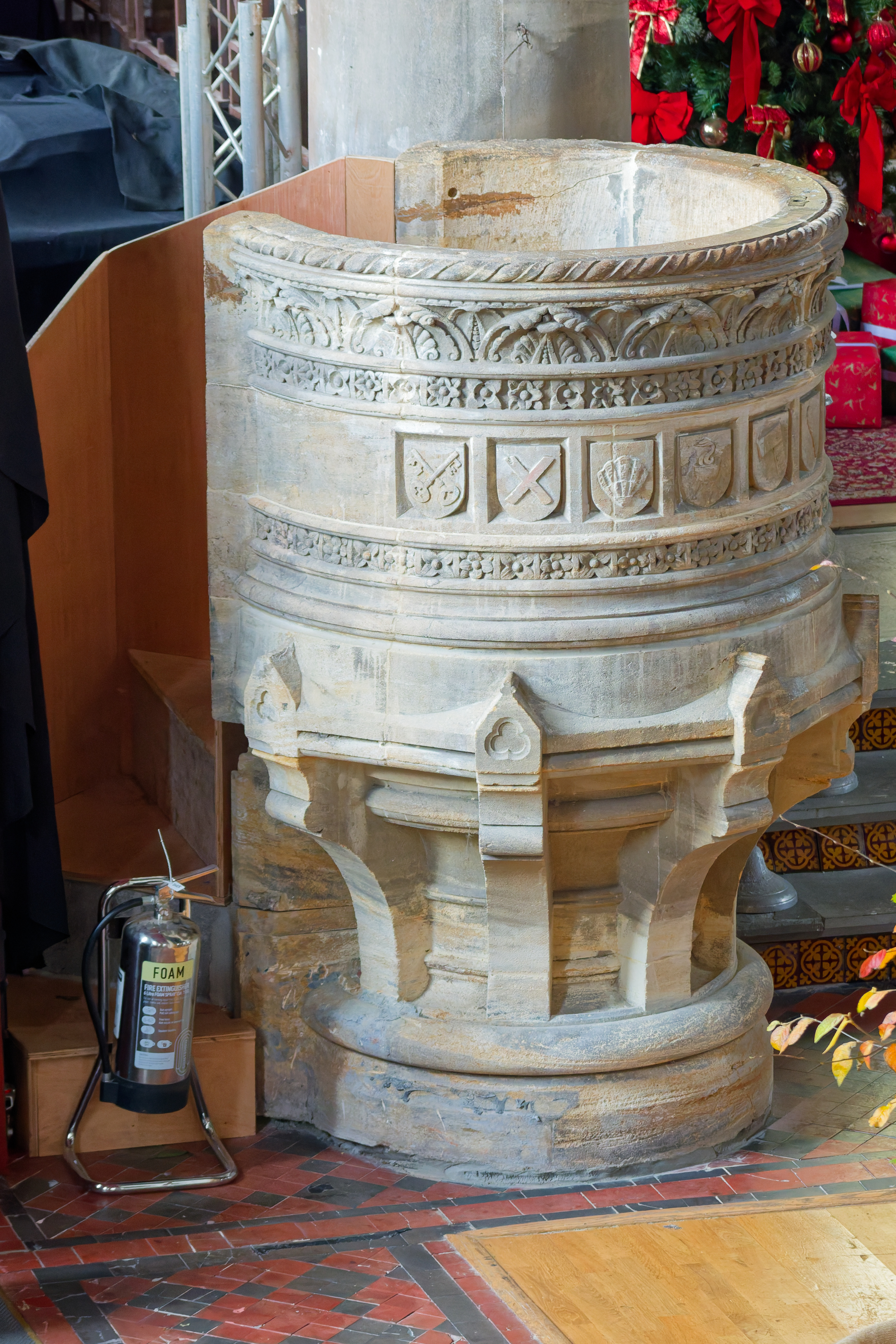
Carved-stone pulpit, 19th century

==== Stained-glass windows ====
Much of the church's glass was destroyed during World War II and subsequently replaced. A window dedicated to the 6th Glosters, designed by Edward Croney of Messrs Croney and Christmas, depicts Saint George and Saint Michael in armour. An earlier version of this window from 1949 depicted a soldier kneeling before an angel holding a crown, with the inscription "Victor Mortis—Victory in Death," but was unrealised. A stained glass window depicting the biblical figures David and Jonathan, designed by Arnold Wathen Robinson, was unveiled on 4 July 1954 as a memorial to the battalion's dead of both World Wars. The east window, depicting Christ in Glory flanked by Saint Michael fighting a dragon, was designed by Harry Stammers and dedicated on 3 May 1964. Before its destruction, the east window depicted the figures of its donors, John Burlington and his wife, alongside an inscription requesting prayers for their souls.

Two-light window on south wall of south aisle, Edward Croney, 1949

Two-light window on east wall of south aisle, Arnold Wathen Robinson, 1954

Three-light window on east-chancel wall, Harry Stammers, 1964

== List of rectors ==
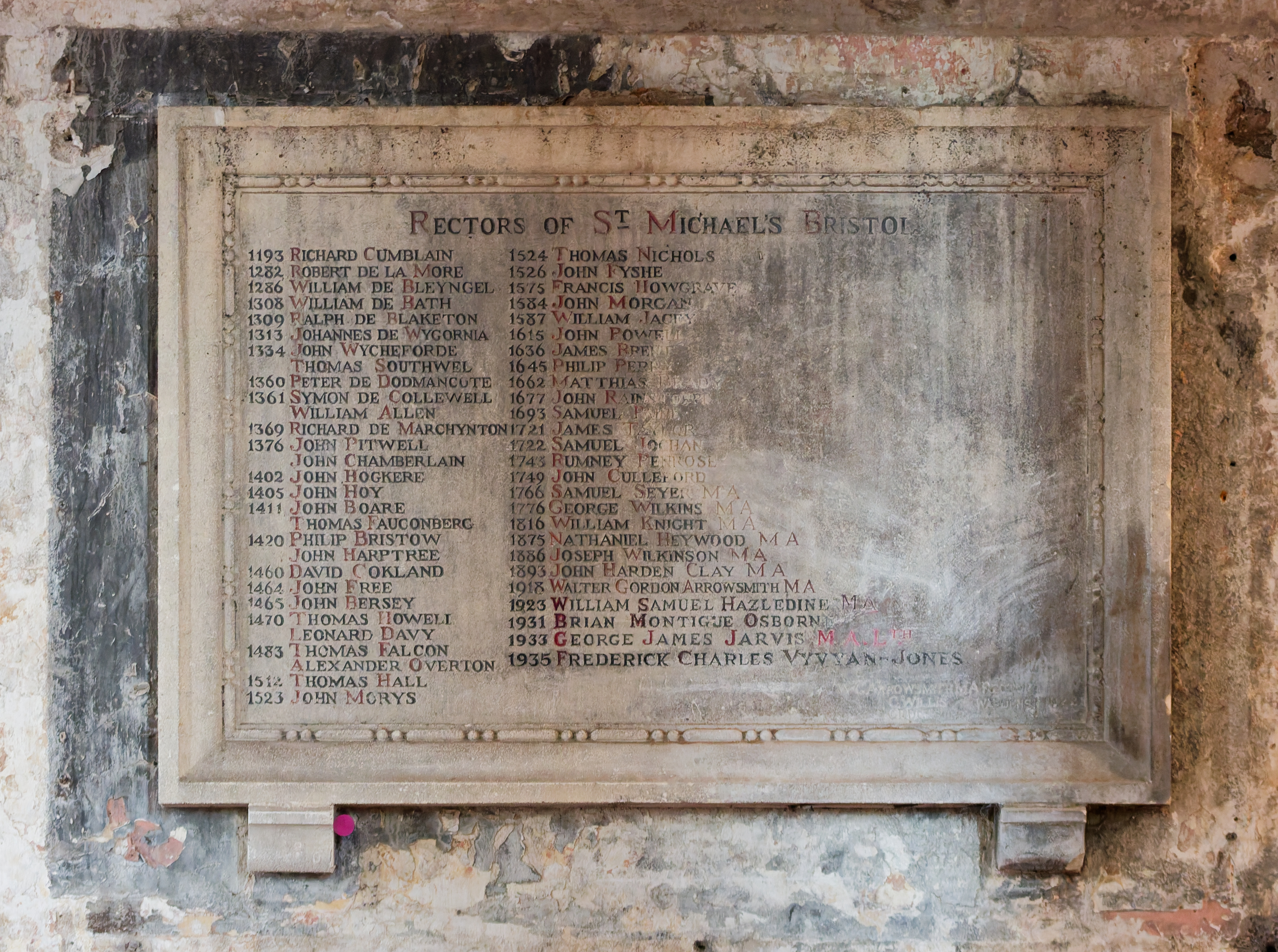
Stone tablet entitled "Rectors of St Michael's Bristol"

The following is a list of rectors of St Michael's on the Mount Without, recorded on a tablet within the church:

| Year | Name | Notes |
|---|---|---|
| 1193 | Richard Cumblain | |
| 1282 | Robert de la More | |
| 1286 | William de Bleyngel | |
| 1308 | William de Bath | |
| 1309 | Ralph de Blaketon | |
| 1313 | Johannes de Wygornia | |
| 1334 | John Wycheforde | |
| (nd) | Thomas Southwel | |
| 1360 | Peter de Bodmancote | |
| 1361 | Symon de Collewell | |
| (nd) | William Allen | |
| 1369 | Richard de Marchynton | |
| 1376 | John Pitwell | |
| (nd) | John Chamberlain | |
| 1402 | John Hogkere | |
| 1405 | John Hoy | |
| 1411 | John Boare | |
| (nd) | Thomas Fauconberg | |
| 1420 | Philip Bristow | |
| (nd) | John Harptree | |
| 1460 | David Cokland | |
| 1464 | John Free | Humanist scholar and Bishop-designate of Bath and Wells |
| 1465 | John Bersey | |
| 1470 | Thomas Howell | |
| (nd) | Leonard Davy | |
| 1483 | Thomas Falcon | |
| (nd) | Alexander Overton | |
| 1512 | Thomas Hall | |
| 1523 | John Morys | |
| 1524 | Thomas Nichols | |
| 1526 | John Fyshe | |
| 1575 | Francis Howgrave | |
| 1584 | John Morgan | |
| 1587 | William Jacey | |
| 1615 | John Powell | |
| 1636 | James Brewer | |
| 1645 | Philip Perry | |
| 1662 | Matthias Brady | |
| 1677 | John Rainstorp | Published author of sermons |
| 1693 | Samuel Paine | |
| 1721 | James Taylor | Headmaster of Bristol Grammar School (1717–1722) |
| 1722 | Samuel Jocham | |
| 1745 | Rumney Penrose | |
| 1749 | John Culleford | |
| 1766 | Samuel Seyer | Headmaster of Bristol Grammar School and father of the historian Samuel Seyer |
| 1776 | George Wilkins M.A. | |
| 1816 | William Knight M.A. | |
| 1875 | Nathaniel Heywood M.A. | |
| 1886 | Joseph Wilkinson M.A. | |
| 1893 | John Harden Clay M.A. | |
| 1918 | Walter Gordon Arrowsmith M.A. | |
| 1923 | William Samuel Hazledine M.A. | |
| 1931 | Brian Montigue Osborn | |
| 1933 | George James Jarvis M.A. | |
| 1935 | Frederick Charles Vyvyan-Jones | Served as Lord Mayor of Bristol (1967–68) |

== See also ==
- Churches in Bristol
- Grade II* listed buildings in Bristol
- St Werburgh's Church and Trinity Centre, two other redundant churches in Bristol that are now in secular use
