= Cotham Church =

Cotham Parish Church
- Church of St Saviour with St Mary, Cotham
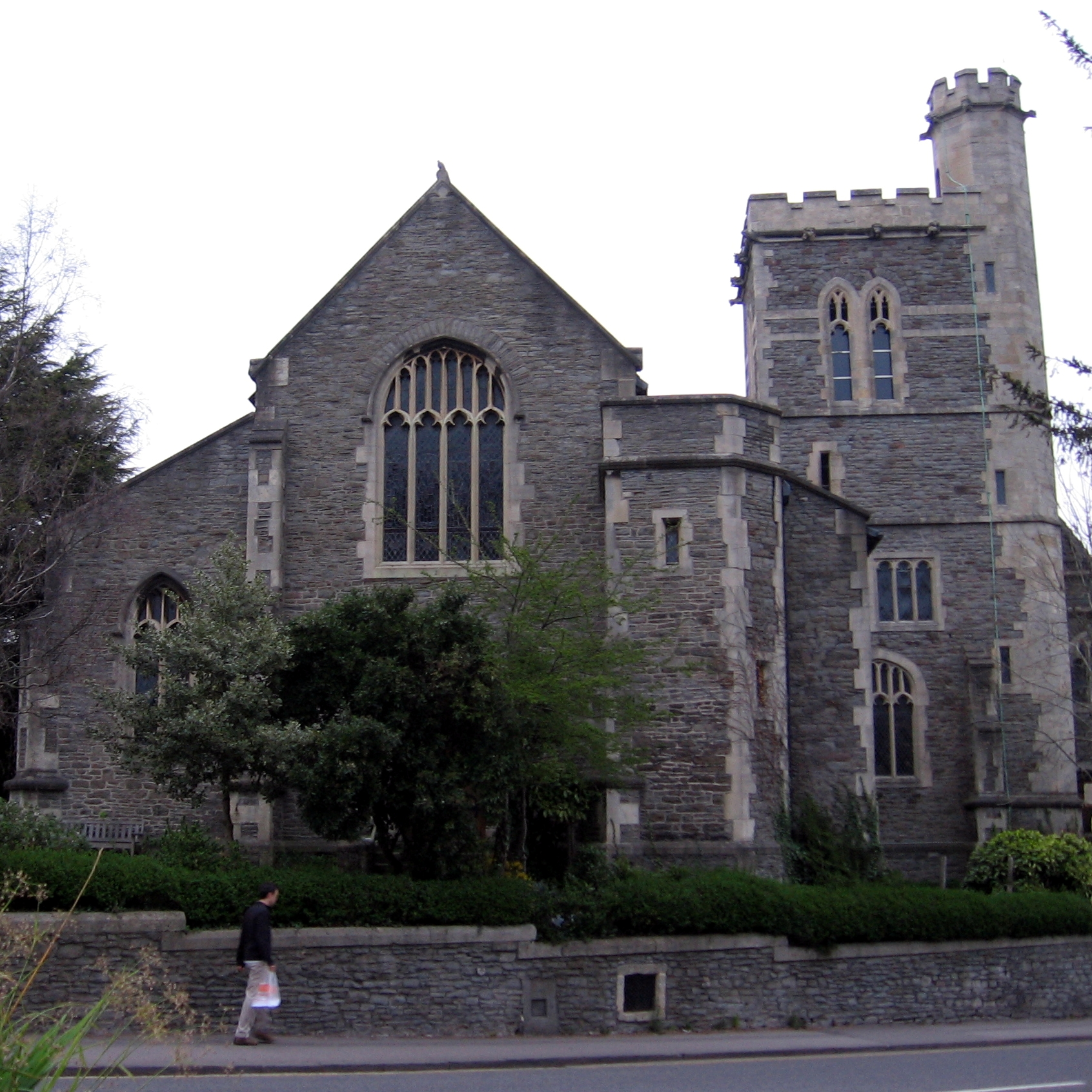

- Location within Bristol
- 51.4625°N 2.6002°W
- Location: Cotham Road, Cotham, Bristol,
- Country: England
- Denomination: Church of England
- Previous denomination: Congregational
- Churchmanship: Liberal Catholic
- Website: Church website

History
- Status: Active

Architecture
- Functional status: Parish church
- Architect: William Butterfield
- Style: Gothic Revival
- Years built: 1842–1843

Administration
- Diocese: Diocese of Bristol
- Archdeaconry: Archdeaconry of Bristol
- Parish: Cotham St Saviour with St Mary

Clergy
- Vicar: The Revd David Stephenson

Cotham Church is a Gothic Revival style church in Cotham, Bristol, England. Since 1975, it has been a Church of England parish church known as the Church of St Saviour with St Mary or simply as Cotham Parish Church.

== History ==
=== Highbury Chapel ===
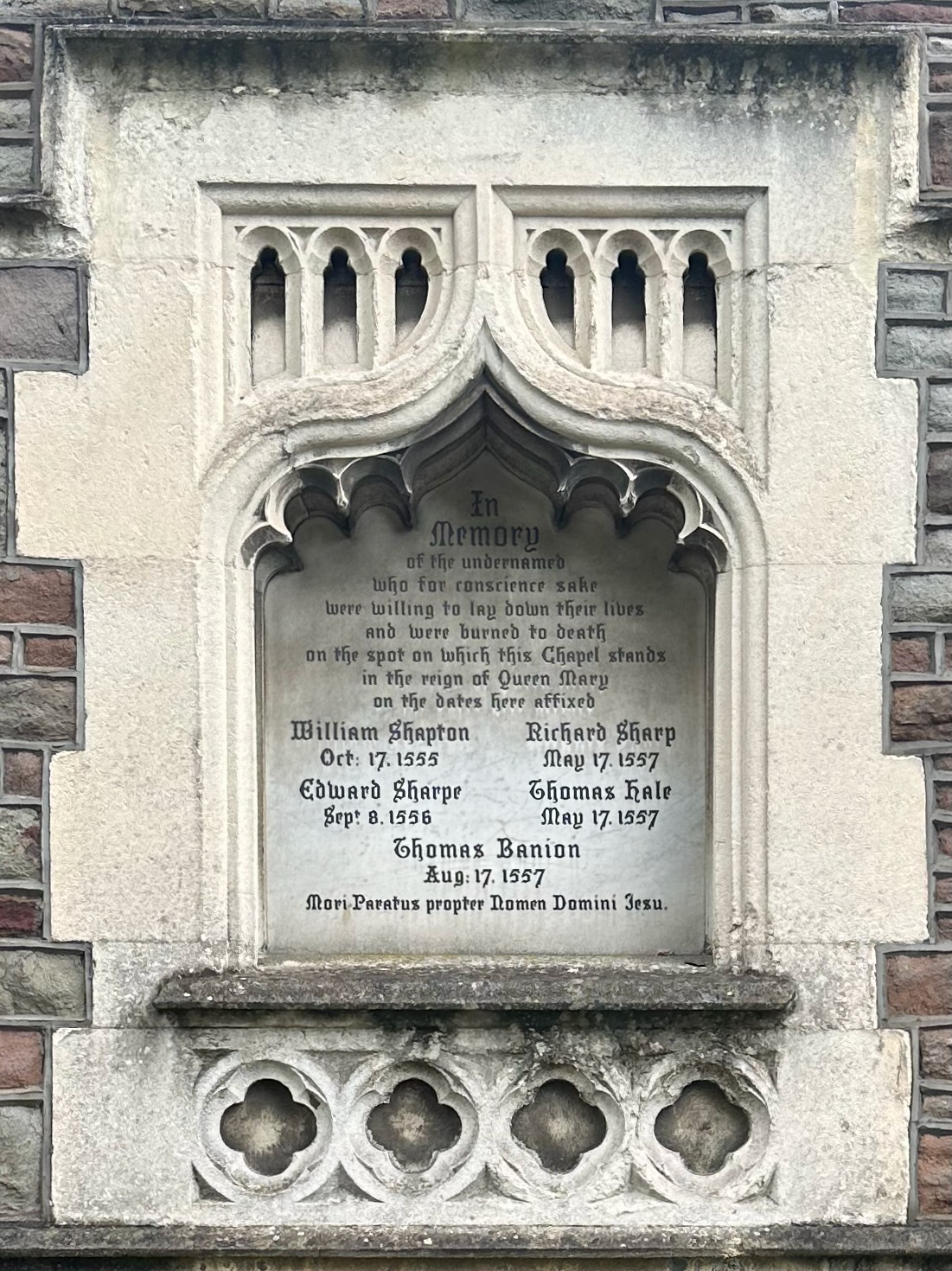
Marian martyrs' memorial Cotham Church

Cotham Church was originally Highbury Congregational Chapel, built in 1842 and opened on 6 July 1843, on land donated by Richard Ash. The architect was William Butterfield and this was his first commission, obtained through his family's connection with William Day Wills of the tobacco firm W. D. & H. O. Wills. Henry Overton Wills II, was Principal Deacon of the chapel during the mid-19th century. The exact location seems to have been chosen in part because its association with the 'Marian Martyrs' who were burned to death for heresy near the site during the 1550s. There is a memorial to them on the exterior north wall of the church and another inside.

The chapel was built in what had been known as 'Gallows Field'. The gallows itself was situated over what is now the crossing point at the start of Cotham Road, between Bewell's Cross and one of the boundary stones of the county of Bristol. The gallows was moved to the New Gaol in 1820 and the cross base was dug up in 1829 when Cotham Road was laid out. A stone said to be from Bewell's Cross is embedded in what is now the boundary wall of the church, with a plaque above it.

The name 'Highbury Chapel' had been chosen by the time the foundation stone was laid, in honour of the nonconformist theological college, Highbury College in London. This was the 'largest and most prestigious' dissenting academy in England at that time. Highbury College was also where the chapel's first minister studied. The name 'Highbury' was soon adopted by various properties and houses built in the area, so that it became a general name for the district. These still feature in local names such as Highbury Villas, Highbury Parade and the pub, Highbury Vaults.

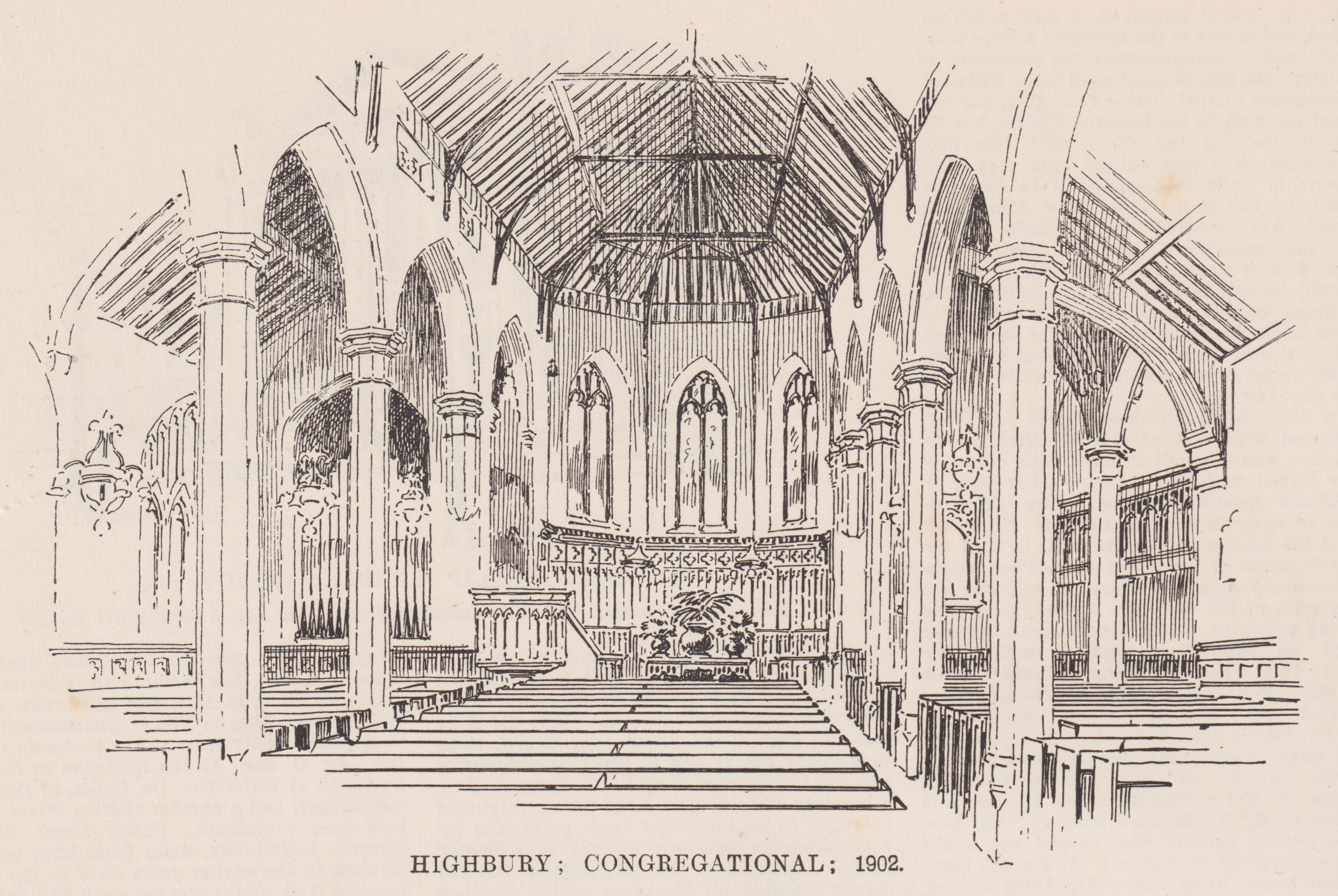
Highbury Chapel interior, 1902

The chapel opened to worship in July 1843 and a church was formed, with an initial congregation of twenty-one people, who were ministered to by visiting preachers. In July 1844, the Rev. David Thomas was appointed as minister, remaining in post till 1875. He became a prominent member of the Congregational Union of England and Wales, serving as its chairman in 1865. The chapel grew during this period, partly because of the Rev Thomas' reputation as a preacher and partly as a result of the residential and commercial development of the area. Architectural developments include the construction of the chapel's apse, tower, transepts and vestries, as well as a school that included a lecture room and three classrooms. These were all added in 1863 by Edward William Godwin, raising the seating capacity to 700.

When the Rev David Thomas died in 1875, his son, Arnold Thomas, was appointed minister. Arnold Thomas's reputation also went well beyond Bristol. Like his father, he served as Chairman of the Congregational Union of England and Wales. At one time he was apparently offered a professorship at Mansfield College, which was Oxford University's first nonconformist college. Despite being a member of the 'free churches', Arnold Thomas maintained good relations with the Bishop and Dean of Bristol. In 1918 they invited him to lead the prayers at the Cathedral, on behalf of the city's nonconformists, at the thanksgiving service to celebrate the Armistice that ended the Great War.

=== Anglican church ===
In 1972 the Congregational Union of England and Wales broke up, with parts of it merging into the United Reform Church, while other parts formed alternative unions, or disaffiliated. In 1975, the Church of England purchased Highbury Chapel, converting it into an Anglican church. It is now known as the Church of St Saviour with St Mary or simply as Cotham Parish Church. The parish of "Cotham: St Saviour with St Mary" is part of a united benefice with St Paul's Church, Clifton, Bristol in the Archdeaconry of Bristol in the Diocese of Bristol. The church stands in the Liberal Catholic tradition of the Church of England.

The church has been designated by English Heritage as a Grade II* listed building.

== See also ==
- Churches in Bristol
- Grade II* listed buildings in Bristol
