= St Paul's Church, Clifton, Bristol =

Church in Bristol, England

Coordinates: 51.4591°N 2.6113°W

St Paul's Church, Clifton
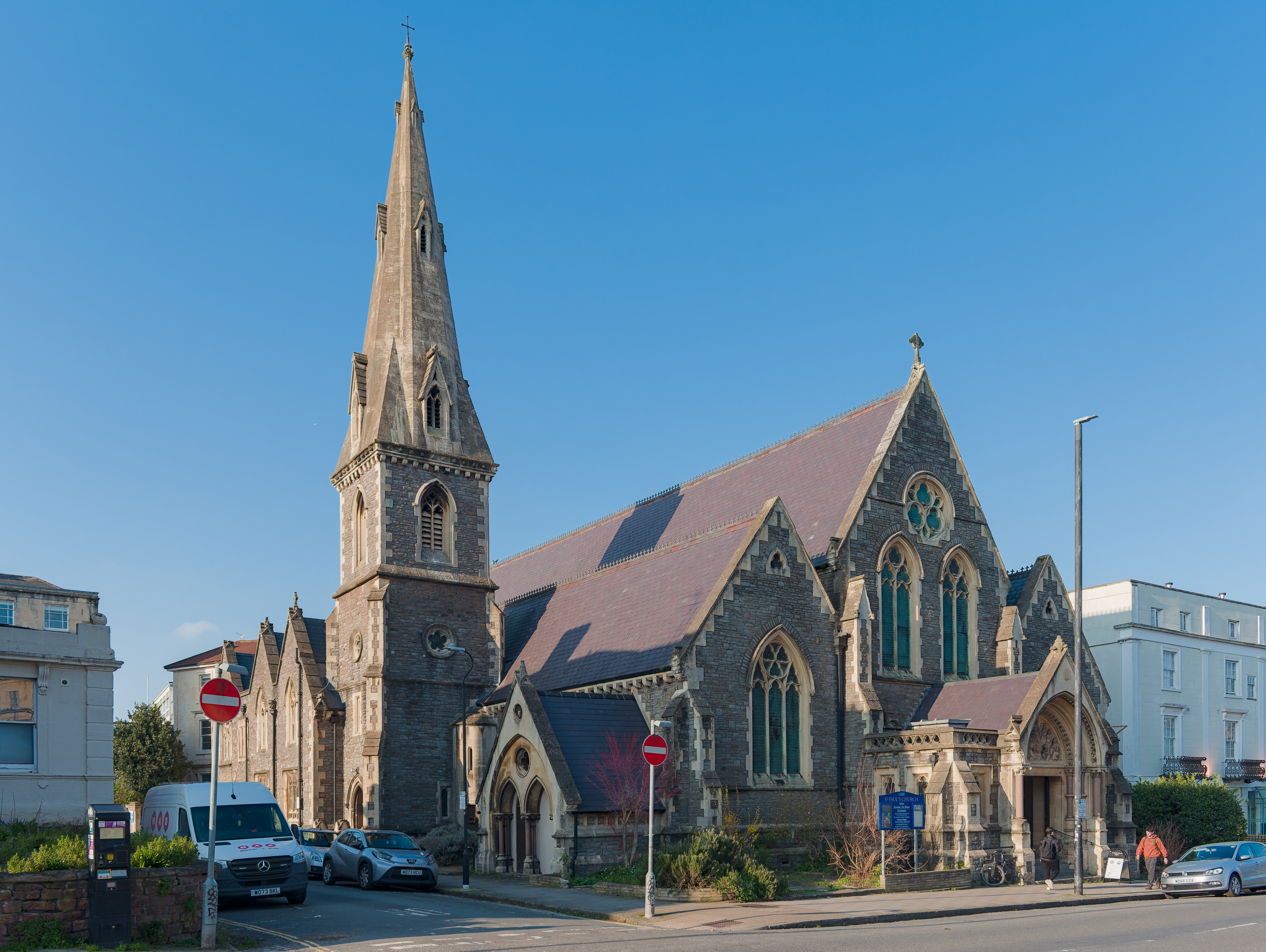
- St Paul's from the southwest
- St Paul's Church, Clifton
- Location: St Paul's Road, Clifton, Bristol BS8 1LP
- Country: England
- Denomination: Church of England
- Churchmanship: Liberal Catholic
- Website: Parish website

History
- Status: Active
- Consecrated: 1868

Architecture
- Functional status: Parish church

Administration
- Diocese: Diocese of Bristol
- Archdeaconry: Archdeaconry of Bristol
- Deanery: City Deanery
- Parish: Clifton, St. Paul

Clergy
- Vicar: The Revd David Stephenson

St Paul's Church, on St Paul's Road, Clifton, is an Anglican parish church and was formerly the University of Bristol Church, in the City Deanery of the Diocese of Bristol. The church is one of two in the Benefice of St Paul's and Cotham, David Stephenson, inducted as vicar of the Benefice in 2018, is the current incumbent.

The congregation is liberal Anglo-Catholic in churchmanship. St. Paul's is part of Inclusive Church, offers Fair Trade items, and participates in a local Christians in Science group.

The current building largely dates from 1867, when it was rebuilt following a fire, using a variety of stones. The architect was Charles Hansom, who lived locally at the time, following his work on Clifton College. Hansom was able to retain the tower and spire by Manners and Gill from the original building. The church is listed Grade II and is notable for its stained glass windows and mosaics lining the walls, and especially the reredos.

In March 2012 the church was awarded a grant from English Heritage to repair the roof. A major factor in this, according to English Heritage, is that the mosaics and windows are of national importance.

== Stained glass ==
The windows in St Paul's were produced by Hardman & Co. of Birmingham in the 1860s. Details of the correspondence between the firm and Hansom, and the prices paid for the windows, are taken from Hardman's records, now held in the Birmingham City Archives.

=== East window ===
The date of the East Window is not known, but Julian Small presumes that it was made at the same time as the rebuilding of the church, in 1868, as it is above the altar and would have been, as now, part of the focus of attention of the congregation. As some of the details of the construction of the window differ from the other later windows, this is quite likely.

In a letter dated 12 October 1868, Hansom wrote to Hardman's requesting that a sketch was made and an estimate of price:

£175 is about the limit we are authorised to spend on the glass, but your estimate must also include in addition all expenses of carriage & fixing, wire guard, removing old glass (which must be left here) & commission

Apparently the glass removed remains in the crypt of St Paul's today. This letter was the start of a lengthy correspondence. The east window shows the story of the Conversion of St Paul, taken from the Acts of the Apostles, including the Stoning of Stephen; Saul struck down on the road to Damascus; and Ananias curing Paul's blindness.

=== South aisle windows ===
The windows along the south side of the church are believed to have been the next to be glazed. While each window was commissioned and paid for individually, they were conceived as a set. These windows depict the life of Christ, from Nativity to Ascension, but unusually there is no Crucifixion scene; it is possible that one was intended elsewhere. The nativity is shown in the westernmost window, and the Ascension in the window now in the Julian Chapel. The windows contain at the bottom the reference to the Gospel from which the story was taken and the dedication. [detail to be added] All four Gospels are represented.

=== North aisle windows ===
The windows on the North side of the church are the most recent depicting the Raising of Lazarus, from 1887, and Christ walking on water. Though these were produced by Hardman's, the design is somewhat different from those in the South Aisle, in that a single episode flows from one light to another. This is a rare thing in English 19th Century stained glass.

=== West Window ===
The West Window, above the main entrance to the Church, was donated by a Major General Fitzgerald, HM Indian Army. A brass plaque on the pillar on the north side of the door reads

The three windows at the West end of the Nave are the gift of Major General Fitz-Gerald H.M. Indian Army in affectionate memory of his beloved wife, Anne Evered, who died at Clifton 17 August 1869 and was buried at Arnos Vale.

The records held in the Birmingham Archive show that Hardman's were not always punctual in delivery, and General Fitzgerald refused to pay the bill for the windows until alterations had been made and he had been supplied with a drawing of the design.

== Mosaics ==
The mosaics of St Paul's are a collection of 11 opus sectile works, lining the nave and in the reredos, produced by James Powell & Sons of Whitefriars, London. The earliest of these, in the reredos, were installed in 1903, a gift to the church from Sir George White following his daughter's wedding. The most recent is from the late 1920s. As such, these eleven mosaics cover virtually the whole period of opus sectile work by Powell's. As Powell's order and cash books are now in the Victoria and Albert Museum we have access to information about the mosaics. The Good Shepard was installed in 1919 at a cost of £240 while the smaller Angel of Victory installed in the same year cost £115.

=== Details of selected mosaics ===
==== Purity with Lily ====
Opus sectile panel to the right of the tower porch door. Donated to the church to commemorate Catharine Cole, who died on 4 July 1902. Powells cash book records this on 16 May 1903, designed by Hardwick and costing £15.

==== St David with His Harp ====
Opus sectile panel, to the left of the tower porch door. Donated to commemorate RHF Farrar Lambeert, who sang in the choir for 30 years and died on 28 April 1903. The cash books date the panel on 23 November 1903, designed by Penwarden, and costing £23.

== Music ==
=== Choir ===
St Paul's is home to the University of Bristol Church Choir, a choir of university students who sing weekly choral services during term time under the direction of two Organ Scholars, usually undergraduate students from the University of Bristol. The choir largely sings music of the Anglican choral tradition.

The choir is affiliated to the University of Bristol Students' Union as a student society and thus welcomes undergraduates and postgraduates from the University to sing in the choir.

=== Organ ===
St Paul's houses a two-manual organ built by F. Rothwell in 1905. The organ incorporates some earlier pipework, but was substantially reconstructed in 1975 by Percy Daniel & Co. in a more eclectic style. It has 29 speaking stops over 2 manuals and pedals, with electric action. A full specification can be found on the NPOR.

=== One Equal Music ===
In 2021, St Paul's launched a new music project called One Equal Music. One Equal Music seeks to widen access to musical opportunities, in order to improve wellbeing, foster community, raise confidence, and encourage talent. Through the project, St Paul's has established a Choral Scholarship Programme, Children's Choir in East Bristol, Singing for the Brain group, Lunchtime Concert Series, and a number of community focused music events.
