= List of clock manufacturers =

The following is a list of notable companies that produced, or currently produce clocks. Where known, the location of the company and the dates of clock manufacture follow the name. In some instances the "company" consisted of a single person.

== Australian clockmakers ==
- ADINA, Woolloongabba (1971–present)
- COBB & Co., (1853–present)
- Ingrams Time Systems, (late 1800s-present)

== Austrian clockmakers ==
- L. Hainz, Prague (1813 - 1873) Fine inlaid Vienna Regulators, Dwarf Vienna Regulator
- Carl Saboy, Vienna (1875-1890)
- Karl Suchy & Sohne, Vienna (1870–1890 (?))
- Mikulas of Kadan, Prague
- M.Miller & Sohn, Vienna (1800-?)
- Wilhelm Bauer, Vienna (active 1884) President of Vienna Clockmakers Society 1881, and active Clockmaker until late 1920s. Produced Post Office/Official Government Vienna Regulators. Some clocks signed "Kreutz & Bauer in Wein".
- Gebr. Resch, Ebensee, Austria. Used trademark "REMEMBER". Factory began 1862 in Vienna, moved to Ebensee 1871. Produced up to 15,000 clocks in 1885. Factory sold to Junghans 1901 & renamed "Uhrenfabrik Ebensee Austria".
- Johann Mold, (c. 1870) Vienna. Example known: Serpentine Dwarf Case Vienna Regulator. No record found of this maker.

== Canadian clockmakers ==
- The Arthur Pequegnat Clock Company

== Chinese clockmakers ==
- Twemco

== Danish clockmakers ==
- Peter Mathiesen, Copenhagen (1725–1768)
- Mette Magrete Tvistman (1741-1827)
- Henrik Kyhl, Copenhagen (1818–1866)
- Bertram Larsen, Køge/Copenhagen (1827-1970s)

== English clockmakers ==
- Mayfair
- Joseph Antram (clockmaker/watchmaker) to King George I. (Fleet St. London) Active 1691 - 1723. Bracket clock examples exist.
- Sir John Bennett; 65 Cheapside, London, watch, clock and jewellery manufacturer (15 October 1814- 3 July 1897), was a watchmaker and local politician. He was the eldest son of John Bennett, watchmaker, of Greenwich.
- Edward East, clockmaker to King Charles I.
- Chas Goodall (Clockmaker)1793-1818 26 Bridges St, Covent Garden.
- George Graham (7 July 1673 – 20 November 1751) a partner of Thomas Tompion
- Frank Hope-Jones (1867-1950)
- Joseph Johnson; Liverpool (1795–1827)
- Thomas Kefford (fl. 1710–1750).
- Joseph Knibb - Born 1640 Claydon, Oxfordshire Died 1711
- George Littlewort; London (fl. 1826–48)
- Metamec (1947-1984)
- Newgate Clocks; Shropshire (1991–present)
- Bartholomew Newsam; London (died 1593)
- William Hamilton Shortt (1881-1971)
- Thwaites & Reed Clockmakers Ltd.; East Sussex (1740–present)
- Thomas Tompion (1639–1713)
- John Alker, Wigan (1775-1850)
- Benjamin Ward; London (1799–1808)
- Eardley Norton, a most highly esteemed member of the Clockmakers' Company, was working between 1762 and 1794. There are clocks by him in the Royal Collection and many museums worldwide. Norton made an astronomical clock for George III which still stands in Buckingham Palace.

== French clockmakers ==
- Antoine Thiout the elder (Paris, 1692–1767)
- Abraham-Louis Breguet; Paris (1775–1823)
- Louis-Gabriel Brocot; Paris (1791–1872)
- Achille Brocot; Paris (1817–1878)
- Antoine Brocot; Paris (1814–1874)
- Jean-Baptiste Delettrez; Paris (1816–1887)
- Japy Freres; Beaucourt (1776–1910 (?))
- Auguste Amiet; Strasbourg (1774–1814)

== German clockmakers ==
- Johann Baptist Beha (1815–1898)
- Gustav Becker Clock Company; Freiburg in Schlesien, Silesia (1850–1938)
- Florn
- Thomas Haller (Thomas Haller AG), Schwenningen (1880-1900) then merged with Junghans
- Thomas Ernst Haller (Haller AG), Schwenningen (1902-1928) then merged with Kienzle
- Haller Uhrenfabrik GmbH, Simonswald (1874–present)
- Hamburg-Amerikanische Uhrenfabrik, Schramberg (HAU, HAC in English markets) (1883-1930) then absorbed by Junghans
- Hermle Clocks (1922–present)
- Junghans, Schramberg (1861–present)
- Kieninger Clock Company, initially in Mönchweiler, 1921 new factory in Aldingen (1912–present)
- Kieninger & Obergfell Uhrenfabrik (KUNDO trademark), Sankt Georgen (1918 - recent)
- Kienzle Uhren, Schwenningen - Schlenker and Keinzle until c1897 (1883-1996)
- Franz Ketterer
- Lenzkirch Clock Co (Aktiengessellschaft fur Ukrenfabrikation) (1851-1929) factory operated by Junghans 1929-1932
- Mauthe Clock Company (c1870 - 1976)
- Helmut Mayr Uhren GmbH ( - present)
- Erwin Sattler GmbH & Co. Kg (1958–present)
- Jakob Schlenker Grusen, Schwenningen (JSGUS/ISGUS) (1888–present)
- Johannes Schlenker, Schwenningen (1822-1883) then Schlenker and Kienzle (1883-1897) then Kienzle
- Sigmund Riefler of the firm Clemens Riefler, Nesselwang and Munich (1890–1965)
- Carl Werner Uhrenfabrik, Villingen (1870-1912) taken over by Kienzle
- Winterhalder & Hofmeier (clocks)

== Korean ==
- Sinix
- Lions
- "Sam Sung"
- Jeonggwang
- EXPOS

== Russian clockmakers ==
- Egor Grigorievich Kuznetzov-Zhepinskiy (1775–1805); Nijniy Tagil
- Ivan Mezgin (1855–1900 (?)); Cherniy Yar, Siberia
- Lev Isidorovich Nechaev (1825–1861); Yaroslavl

== Scottish clockmakers ==
- James Ivory and son (active 1729–1800)

== Swedish clockmakers ==
- Betty Linderoth (1822-1900)
- Hilda Petrini (1838-1895)
- Johann Zehr (1841-1892); Arvika

== Swiss clockmakers ==
- Gallet & Co. (1466–present); Geneva
- Jaeger-LeCoultre (1833–present); Vaud
- Zenith (watchmaker) (1863–present); Neuchâtel
- Azura clocks ( 1914 to present); Moutier

== Ukrainian clockmakers ==
- Johann Kroeger (1804–1823); Rosental
- Kroeger & Co (1804–1938); Rosental
- Peter Lepp (ca. 1850); Chortitza

== See also ==
- List of watch manufacturers
