= Newgate (disambiguation) =

Newgate was one of the historic seven gates of the London Wall around the City of London.

Newgate may also refer to:

- Newgate, Bristol, a gateway and gaol in Bristol
- Newgate, Chester, an arch bridge in Chester
- Newgate (company), a British designer and manufacturer of clocks and watches
- Newgate Education Center, a school in Minneapolis, Minnesota
- Newgate Mall, a shopping mall in Ogden, Utah
- Newgate novel, a novel about criminals published in England from the 1820s until the 1840s
- Newgate (York), a street in York

== See also ==
- New Gate, a gate in the Old City of Jerusalem
- The New Gate, a Japanese light novel series
- Newgate Prison (disambiguation)
- Newgate Street (disambiguation)
