= Crosnier =

Crosnier is a surname of French origin. People with this surname include:

- Antoine Cronier, or Crosnier (1732–c. 1806), French clockmaker
- Éric Crosnier (born 1972), French footballer
- François-Louis Crosnier (1792–1867), French politician and playwright
