= Joseph Kaspar Bollermann =

German clockmaker

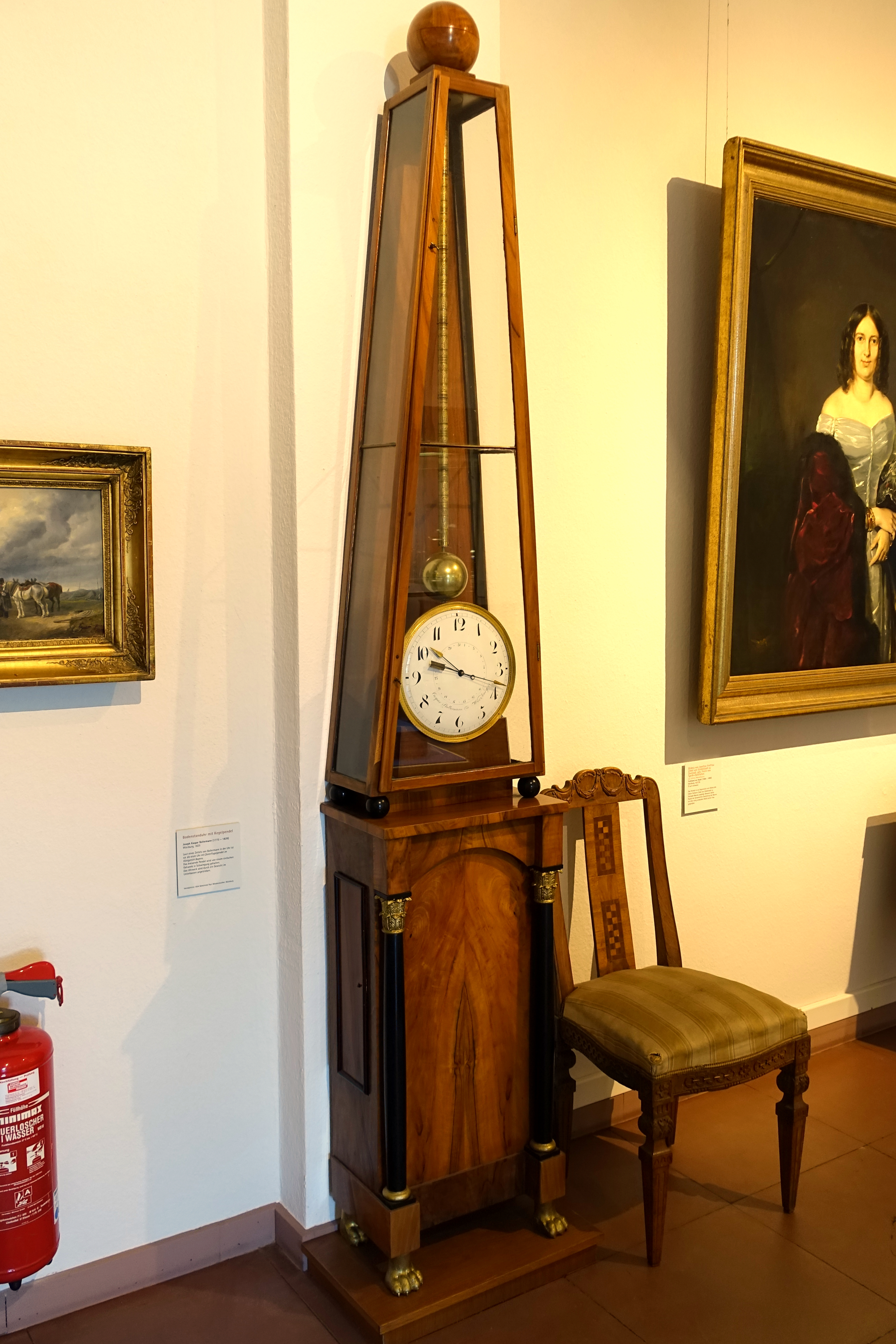
Longcase clock with a cone pendulum, by Joseph Kaspar Bollermann, Würzburg, 1825

Joseph Kaspar Bollermann (1773 - 21 December 1839) was a German clockmaker active in Würzburg. He performed his apprenticeship with a cousin from 1785-1790, and on 26 February 1796 was admitted to the guild as a watch maker, acquiring Würzburg civil rights a few days later on 3 March. On 30 January 1797 he married Margaretha Dörfler, daughter of the deceased Würzburg court goldsmith Johann Baptist Dörffer, and sister of goldsmith Georg Stephan Dörffer. From 1806-1822 Bollermann served as a juror of his guild. He had three apprentices.
