= Semicircle law =

The semicircle law may refer to:

- The Wigner semicircle distribution, which describes the eigenvalues of a random matrix, or
- The Semicircle law (quantum Hall effect), which describes a relationship between components of the macroscopic conductivity tensor.
