= Charles Haros =

French geometer

- Born: 1700s
- Died: 1800s
- Scientific career
- Fields: Mathematics

Charles Haros was a geometer (mathematician) in the French Bureau du Cadastre at the end of the eighteenth century and the beginning of the nineteenth century.

== Haros' conversion table ==
One of the primary tasks of the Bureau du Cadastre was the accurate mapping of France for the purpose of taxation but from time to time the bureau also provided computational services to other parts of the government.

One of the changes instituted by the French Revolution was to convert France to the metric system and this necessitated changing from a fractional to a decimal representation of rational numbers. While Haros was involved many computation projects at the Bureau du Cadastre including the computation of de Prony’s tables of logarithms and the preparation of the French ephemeris, Connaissance des Temps, he is best known for a small table he prepared to convert fractions to their decimal equivalents.

Haros’ conversion table appeared in a tract, Instruction Abrégée sur les nouvelles Mesures qui dovient étre introduites dans toute république, au vendémiaire an 10; avec tables de rapports et reductions, that was presented to the Mathematics Section of the Institut de France and subsequently abstracted in Journal de l'École Polytechnique under the title "Tables pour évaluer une fraction ordinaire avec autant de decimals qu’on voudra; et pour trouver la fraction ordinaire la plus simple, et qui approche sensiblement d’une fraction décimale."

In preparing his table, Haros needed to create the list of all 3,003 irreducible (vulgar) fractions with denominators less than 100. In order to make sure he got them all he harnessed an algorithm elucidated by Nicolas Chuquet some one-hundred and fifty years earlier. Chuquet called it his "règle des nombres moyens". Today, we call it the mediant. The mediant is the fraction between two fractions a/c and b/d whose numerator is the sum of the numerators, a+b, and whose denominator is the sum of the denominators, c+d. That is, the mediant of the fractions a/c and b/d is the fraction (a+b)/(c+d).

In his paper Haros demonstrated that the mediant is always irreducible and, more importantly for this purposes, if one starts with the sequence of fractions

1/99, 1/98, 1/97, ..., 1/4, 1/3, 1/2, 2/3, 3/4, 5/6, ..., 96/97, 97/98, 98/99

and just keeps applying the rule, only keeping the result if the denominator is less than one-hundred, then they generate all 3,003.

== A curious property ==
Roughly fifteen years later in England, Henry Goodwyn set out to create a much more ambitious version of Haros’ table. In particular, Goodwyn wanted to tabulate the decimal values for all irreducible fractions with denominators less than or equal to 1,024. There are 318,963 such fractions. As a warm up and a test of the commercial market for such a table in 1816 he published for private circulation The First Centenary of a Series of Concise and Useful Tables of all the Complete Decimal Quotients, which can arise from dividing a unit, or any whole Number less than each Divisor by all Integers from 1 to 1024.

John Farey observed the mediant property in this table and mused in a letter to The Philosophical Magazine and Journal as follows:

"I am not acquainted, whether this curious property of vulgar fractions has been before pointed out?; or whether it may admit of any easy or general demonstration ?; which are points on which I should be glad to learn the sentiments of some of your mathematical readers; ..."

== (Mis)naming of the Farey sequence ==
Augustin Cauchy read Farey’s letter and published a paper "Démonstration d’un Théorème Curieux sur les Nombres" reproving Haros’ results without acknowledgement. In his paper Cauchy referred to the mediant as "a remarkable property of ordinary fractions observed by M. J. Farey." Thus, an ordered sequence of all vulgar fractions with denominators less than a given value became known as a Farey sequence rather than perhaps more rightfully as either a Chuquet sequence or a Haros sequence.

== Publications ==
- Cauchy, Augustin Louis. "Démonstration d'un Théorème Curieux sur Les Nombres". Bulletin des Sciences, par la Société Philomatique de Paris, Vol. 3, No. 3 (1816), pp. 133–135.
- Farey, John. "On a Curious Property of Vulgar Fractions". The Philosophical Magazine and Journal, Vol. 47, No. 3 (1816), pp. 385–386.
- Goodwyn, Henry. The First Centenary of a Series of Concise and Useful Tables of all the Complete Decimal Quotients, which can arise from dividing a unit, or any whole Number less than each Divisor by all Integers from 1 to 1024, Private Distribution, 18p, 1816.
- Haros, Charles. Comptes faits à la manière de Darême, sur les nouveaux poids et measures, aves les pris proportionnels, à l’usage et autres. Paris:Frimin Didot, 1806.
- Haros, Charles. "Tables pour évaluer une fraction ordinaire avec autant de decimals qu’on voudra; et pour trouver la fraction ordinaire la plus simple, et qui approche sensiblement d’une fraction décimale". Journal de École Polytechnique, Vol. 6, No. 11 (1801), pp. 364–368.
- Haros, Charles. Instruction Abrégée sur les nouvelles Mesures qui dovient étre introduites dans toute république, au vendémiaire an 10; avec tables de rapports et reductions. Paris:Firmin Didot, 1801.

== See also ==
- Ivor Grattan-Guinness has written a number of books and papers on mathematics in France in the eighteenth and nineteenth centuries.
- Gaspard De Prony set up the Bureau du Cadastre and lead the project to compute the great logarithmic and trigonometric tables, the Tables du cadastre
