= Sant Blanc =

- Product type: Wristwatches, accessories, Gourmet Chocolate
- Country: France
- Introduced: Paris, France(1779)
- Markets: Jewelers, Watchmaking
- Previous owners: Gaston Sant Blanc
- Ambassador: Jon Todd (CEO)
- Tagline: A World of Luxury
- Website: www.santblanc.com

Sant Blanc is a family owned watch and jewelry company founded in 1779 by Gaston Sant Blanc. Sant Blanc sells jewelry and luxury wristwatches to an international market.

== History ==
In 1779, a self-educated French clockmaker and mathematician Gaston Sant Blanc crafted a complicated clock movement in Paris, France. Sant Blanc continued his work in Paris where he crafted innovative micro movements and complicated pocket watches. In 1895 his grandson Herschel Gaston Sant Blanc, a master watchmaker, continued development of complications in period micro sized movement pocket watches, always endeavoring to craft smaller, more accurate time keepers. In 1899, Sant Blanc introduced a wristwatch for ladies. The all gold, ladies time keeper on a bracelet was designed and made entirely by the Sant Blanc family. While most French watchmakers relocated to Switzerland, the Sant Blanc family remained in Paris a family owned firm. Sant Blanc continued to develop timepieces, complicated movement wristwatches, clocks, and fine, luxury jewelry. In 1999, Sant Blanc began to offer Swiss made watches and timepieces on the internet. Today, Sant Blanc is headquartered in the United States and led by Sant Blanc's great-grandson Mr. Jon Todd.
