= Newgate Prison (disambiguation) =

Newgate Prison was a prison in the City of London, in use between 1188 and 1902. Newgate Prison may also refer to:

- Newgate Prison, Dublin, a prison in use between 1783 and 1893
- Newgate Prison, the first penitentiary in New York state, in use between 1797 and 1829
- Old Newgate Prison, a colonial prison in Connecticut, now a historic landmark

== See also ==
- Newgate (disambiguation)
