= Farey sequence =

Increasing sequence of reduced fractions

Farey diagram to F_{9} represented with circular arcs. In the SVG image, hover over a curve to highlight it and its terms.

Farey diagram to F_{9}.

Symmetrical pattern made by the denominators of the Farey sequence, F_{9}.

Symmetrical pattern made by the denominators of the Farey sequence, F_{25}.

In mathematics, the Farey sequence of order $n$ is the sequence of completely reduced fractions which have denominators less than or equal to $n$, arranged in order of increasing size. Some authors restrict the fractions to the interval between 0 and 1.

A Farey sequence is sometimes called a Farey series, although the terms are not summed.

== Examples ==
The first eight Farey sequences are:

$$\begin{align}
F_1 &= \Big\{\frac{0}{1}, \frac{1}{1}\Big\}, \\[5pt]
F_2 &= \Big\{\frac{0}{1}, \frac{1}{2}, \frac{1}{1}\Big\}, \\[5pt]
F_3 &= \Big\{\frac{0}{1}, \frac{1}{3}, \frac{1}{2}, \frac{2}{3}, \frac{1}{1}\Big\}, \\[5pt]
F_4 &= \Big\{\frac{0}{1}, \frac{1}{4}, \frac{1}{3}, \frac{1}{2}, \frac{2}{3}, \frac{3}{4}, \frac{1}{1}\Big\}, \\[5pt]
F_5 &= \Big\{\frac{0}{1}, \frac{1}{5}, \frac{1}{4}, \frac{1}{3}, \frac{2}{5}, \frac{1}{2}, \frac{3}{5}, \frac{2}{3}, \frac{3}{4}, \frac{4}{5}, \frac{1}{1}\Big\}, \\[5pt]
F_6 &= \Big\{\frac{0}{1}, \frac{1}{6}, \frac{1}{5}, \frac{1}{4}, \frac{1}{3}, \frac{2}{5}, \frac{1}{2}, \frac{3}{5}, \frac{2}{3}, \frac{3}{4}, \frac{4}{5}, \frac{5}{6}, \frac{1}{1}\Big\}, \\[5pt]
F_7 &= \Big\{\frac{0}{1}, \frac{1}{7}, \frac{1}{6}, \frac{1}{5}, \frac{1}{4}, \frac{2}{7}, \frac{1}{3}, \frac{2}{5}, \frac{3}{7}, \frac{1}{2}, \frac{4}{7}, \frac{3}{5}, \frac{2}{3}, \frac{5}{7}, \frac{3}{4}, \frac{4}{5}, \frac{5}{6}, \frac{6}{7}, \frac{1}{1}\Big\}, \\[5pt]
F_8 &= \Big\{\frac{0}{1}, \frac{1}{8}, \frac{1}{7}, \frac{1}{6}, \frac{1}{5}, \frac{1}{4}, \frac{2}{7}, \frac{1}{3}, \frac{3}{8}, \frac{2}{5}, \frac{3}{7}, \frac{1}{2}, \frac{4}{7}, \frac{3}{5}, \frac{5}{8}, \frac{2}{3}, \frac{5}{7}, \frac{3}{4}, \frac{4}{5}, \frac{5}{6}, \frac{6}{7}, \frac{7}{8}, \frac{1}{1}\Big\}.
\end{align}$$

Sorted

 F1 = {0/1,                                                                                                          1/1}
 F2 = {0/1,                                                   1/2,                                                   1/1}
 F3 = {0/1,                               1/3,                1/2,                2/3,                               1/1}
 F4 = {0/1,                     1/4,      1/3,                1/2,                2/3,      3/4,                     1/1}
 F5 = {0/1,                1/5, 1/4,      1/3,      2/5,      1/2,      3/5,      2/3,      3/4, 4/5,                1/1}
 F6 = {0/1,           1/6, 1/5, 1/4,      1/3,      2/5,      1/2,      3/5,      2/3,      3/4, 4/5, 5/6,           1/1}
 F7 = {0/1,      1/7, 1/6, 1/5, 1/4, 2/7, 1/3,      2/5, 3/7, 1/2, 4/7, 3/5,      2/3, 5/7, 3/4, 4/5, 5/6, 6/7,      1/1}
 F8 = {0/1, 1/8, 1/7, 1/6, 1/5, 1/4, 2/7, 1/3, 3/8, 2/5, 3/7, 1/2, 4/7, 3/5, 5/8, 2/3, 5/7, 3/4, 4/5, 5/6, 6/7, 7/8, 1/1}

=== Farey sunburst ===
Plotting F_{6} numerators vs denominators

Starbursts of iterations 1–10 superimposed

Plotting the numerators versus the denominators of a Farey sequence gives a shape like the one to the right, shown for $F_6$.

Reflecting this shape around the diagonal and main axes generates the Farey sunburst, shown below. The Farey sunburst of order n connects the visible integer grid points from the origin in the square of side $2n$, centered at the origin. By Pick's theorem, the area of the sunburst is $4|F_n|-4$, where $|F_n|$ is the number of fractions in F_{n}.

Farey sunburst of order 6, with 1 interior (red) and 96 boundary (green) points giving an area of 1 + 96/2 − 1 = 48, according to Pick's theorem

== History ==
The history of 'Farey series' is very curious — Hardy & Wright (1979)

... once again the man whose name was given to a mathematical relation was not the original discoverer so far as the records go. — Beiler (1964)

Farey sequences are named after the British geologist John Farey, Sr., whose letter about these sequences was published in the Philosophical Magazine in 1816. Farey conjectured, without offering proof, that each new term in a Farey sequence expansion is the mediant of its neighbours. Farey's letter was read by Cauchy, who provided a proof in his Exercices de mathématique, and attributed this result to Farey. In fact, another mathematician, Charles Haros, had published similar results in 1802 which were not known either to Farey or to Cauchy. Thus it was a historical accident that linked Farey's name with these sequences.

== Properties ==
=== Sequence length and index of a fraction ===
The Farey sequence of order $n$ contains all of the members of the Farey sequences of lower orders. In particular, $F_n$ contains all of the members of $F_{n-1}$ and also contains an additional fraction for each number that is less than $n$ and coprime to $n$. For example, $F_6$ consists of $F_5$ together with the fractions $\textstyle\frac{1}{6}$ and $\textstyle\frac{5}{6}$.

The middle term of a Farey sequence $F_n$ is always $\textstyle\frac{1}{2}$ for $n>1$. From this, we can relate the lengths of $F_n$ and $F_{n-1}$ using Euler's totient function $\varphi$:

$$|F_n| = |F_{n-1}| + \varphi(n).$$

Using the fact that $|F_1|=2$, we can derive an expression for the length of $F_n$:

$$|F_n| = 1 + \sum_{m=1}^n \varphi(m) = 1 + \Phi(n),$$
where $\Phi$ is the summatory totient. We also have

$$|F_n| = \frac{1}{2}\bigg(3+\sum_{d=1}^n \mu(d) \left\lfloor \frac{n}{d} \right\rfloor^2 \bigg),$$

where $\mu$ is the Möbius function. Hence, by a Möbius inversion formula,

$$|F_n| = \frac{1}{2} (n+3)n - \sum_{d=2}^n|F_{\lfloor n/d \rfloor}|.$$

The asymptotic behaviour of $F_n$ is

$$|F_n| \sim \frac {3n^2}{\pi^2}.$$

The number of Farey fractions with denominators equal to k in F_{n} is given by φ(k) when k ≤ n and zero otherwise. Concerning the numerators one can define the function $\mathcal{N}_n(h)$ that returns the number of Farey fractions with numerators equal to h in F_{n}. This function has some interesting properties as

$$\mathcal{N}_n(1)=n$$,
$\mathcal{N}_n(p^m)=\left\lceil(n-p^m) \left(1- 1/p \right)\right\rceil$ for any prime number $p$,
$\mathcal{N}_{n+mh}(h)=\mathcal{N}_{n}(h) + m\varphi(h)$ for any integer m ≥ 0,
$$\mathcal{N}_{n}(4h)=\mathcal{N}_{n}(2h) - \varphi(2h).$$

In particular, the property in the third line above implies $\mathcal{N}_{mh}(h)=(m-1)\varphi(h)$ and, further, $\mathcal{N}_{2h}(h)=\varphi(h).$ The latter means that, for Farey sequences of even order n, the number of fractions with numerators equal to n/2 is the same as the number of fractions with denominators equal to n/2, that is $\mathcal{N}_{n}(n/2) = \varphi(n/2)$.

The index $I_n(a_{k,n}) = k$ of a fraction $a_{k,n}$ in the Farey sequence $F_n=\{a_{k,n} : k = 0, 1, \ldots, m_n\}$ is simply the position that $a_{k,n}$ occupies in the sequence. This is of special relevance as it is used in an alternative formulation of the Riemann hypothesis, see below. Various useful properties follow:
$$\begin{align}
I_n(0/1) &= 0, \\[6pt]
I_n(1/n) &= 1, \\[2pt]
I_n(1/2) &= \frac{|F_n|-1}{2}, \\[2pt]
I_n(1/1) &= |F_n|-1 , \\[2pt]
I_n(h/k) &= |F_n|-1 - I_n\left(\frac{k-h}{k}\right).
\end{align}$$

The index of 1/k where n/(i+1) < k ≤ n/i and n is the least common multiple of the first i numbers, n = lcm([2, i]), is given by:
$$I_n(1/k) = 1 + n \sum_{j=1}^{i} \frac{\varphi(j)}{j} - k\Phi(i).$$

A similar expression was used as an approximation of $I_n(x)$ for low values of $x$ in the classical paper by F. Dress. A general expression for $I_n(h/k)$ for any Farey fraction $h/k$ is given in.

=== Farey neighbours ===
Fractions which are neighbouring terms in any Farey sequence are known as a Farey pair and have the following properties.

If a/b and c/d are neighbours in a Farey sequence, with a/b < c/d, then their difference c/d − a/b is equal to 1/bd. Since
$$\frac{c}{d} - \frac{a}{b} = \frac{bc - ad}{bd},$$

this is equivalent to saying that
$$bc - ad = 1.$$

Thus 1/3 and 2/5 are neighbours in F_{5}, and their difference is 1/15.

The converse is also true. If
$$bc - ad = 1$$

for positive integers a, b, c, d with a < b and c < d, then a/b and c/d will be neighbours in the Farey sequence of order max(b,d).

If p/q has neighbours a/b and c/d in some Farey sequence, with a/b < p/q < c/d, then p/q is the mediant of a/b and c/d – in other words,
$$\frac{p}{q} = \frac{a + c}{b + d}.$$

This follows easily from the previous property, since if
$$\begin{align}
&& bp - aq &= qc - pd = 1, \\[4pt]
\implies && bp + pd &= qc + aq, \\[4pt]
\implies && p(b + d) &= q(a + c), \\
\implies && \frac{p}{q} &= \frac{a+c}{b+d}.
\end{align}$$

It follows that if a/b and c/d are neighbours in a Farey sequence then the first term that appears between them as the order of the Farey sequence is incremented is
$$\frac{a+c}{b+d},$$

which first appears in the Farey sequence of order b + d.

Thus the first term to appear between 1/3 and 2/5 is 3/8, which appears in F_{8}.

The total number of Farey neighbour pairs in F_{n} is 2|F_{n}| − 3.

The Stern–Brocot tree is a data structure showing how the sequence is built up from 0 (= 0/1) and 1 (= 1/1), by taking successive mediants. Note, however, that at the nth step of the construction of the Stern–Brocot tree all mediants are included, not only the ones with denominator equal to n.

==== Equivalent-area interpretation ====
Every consecutive pair of Farey rationals have an equivalent area of 1. See this by interpreting consecutive rationals
$$r_1 = \frac{p}{q} \qquad r_2 = \frac{p'}{q'}$$
as vectors (p, q) in the xy-plane. The area is given by
$$A \left(\frac{p}{q}, \frac{p'}{q'} \right) = qp' - q'p.$$
As any added fraction in between two previous consecutive Farey sequence fractions is calculated as the mediant (⊕), then
$$\begin{align}
A(r_1, r_1 \oplus r_2) &= A(r_1, r_1) + A(r_1, r_2) \\
&= A(r_1, r_2) \\
&= 1
\end{align}$$
(since r_{1} = 1/0 and r_{2} = 0/1, its area must be 1).

=== Farey neighbours and continued fractions ===
Fractions that appear as neighbours in a Farey sequence have closely related continued fraction expansions. Every fraction has two continued fraction expansions — in one the final term is 1; in the other the final term is greater by 1. If p/q, which first appears in Farey sequence F_{q}, has the continued fraction expansions
$$\begin{align}
&[0;\ a_1,\ a_2,\ \ldots,\ a_{n-1},\ a_n,\ 1] \\{}
&[0;\ a_1,\ a_2,\ \ldots,\ a_{n-1},\ a_n + 1]
\end{align}$$

then the nearest neighbour of p/q in F_{q} (which will be its neighbour with the larger denominator) has a continued fraction expansion
$$[0;\ a_1,\ a_2,\ \ldots,\ a_n]$$

and its other neighbour has a continued fraction expansion
$$[0;\ a_1,\ a_2,\ \ldots,\ a_{n-1}]$$

For example, 3/8 has the two continued fraction expansions [0; 2, 1, 1, 1] and [0; 2, 1, 2], and its neighbours in F_{8} are 2/5, which can be expanded as [0; 2, 1, 1]; and 1/3, which can be expanded as [0; 2, 1].

=== Farey fractions and the least common multiple ===
The lcm can be expressed as the products of Farey fractions as
$$\text{lcm}[1,2,...,N] = e^{\psi(N)} = \frac{1}{2} \left( \prod_{r \in F_N, 0<r \le 1/2} 2 \sin(\pi r) \right)^2$$

where ψ(N) is the second Chebyshev function.

=== Farey fractions and the greatest common divisor ===
Since the Euler's totient function is directly connected to the gcd so is the number of elements in F_{n},
$$|F_n| = 1 + \sum_{m=1}^n \varphi(m) = 1+ \sum\limits_{m=1}^{n} \sum\limits_{k=1}^m \gcd(k,m) \cos {2\pi\frac{k}{m}} .$$

For any 3 Farey fractions a/b, c/d, e/f the following identity between the gcd's of the 2×2 matrix determinants in absolute value holds:

$$\gcd\left(\begin{Vmatrix} a & c\\b & d \end{Vmatrix}, \begin{Vmatrix} a & e\\b & f \end{Vmatrix} \right)
= \gcd\left(\begin{Vmatrix} a & c\\b & d \end{Vmatrix}, \begin{Vmatrix} c & e\\d & f \end{Vmatrix} \right)
= \gcd\left(\begin{Vmatrix} a & e\\b & f \end{Vmatrix}, \begin{Vmatrix} c & e\\d & f \end{Vmatrix} \right)$$

=== Applications ===
Farey sequences are very useful to find rational approximations of irrational numbers. For example, the construction by Eliahou of a lower bound on the length of non-trivial cycles in the 3x+1 process uses Farey sequences to calculate a continued fraction expansion of the number log_{2}(3).

In physical systems with resonance phenomena, Farey sequences provide an efficient method to compute resonance locations in 1D and 2D.

Farey sequences are prominent in studies of any-angle path planning on square-celled grids, for example in characterizing their computational complexity or optimality. The connection can be considered in terms of r-constrained paths, namely paths made up of line segments that each traverse at most r rows and at most r columns of cells. Let Q be the set of vectors (q, p) such that $1 \leq q \leq r$, $0 \leq p \leq q$, and p, q are coprime. Let Q* be the result of reflecting Q in the line y = x. Let $S = \{ (\pm x, \pm y) : (x, y) \in Q \cup Q* \}$. Then any r-constrained path can be described as a sequence of vectors from S. There is a bijection between Q and the Farey sequence of order r given by (q, p) mapping to $\tfrac{p}{q}$.

=== Ford circles ===
Comparison of Ford circles and a Farey diagram with circular arcs for n from 1 to 9. Each arc intersects its corresponding circles at right angles. In the SVG image, hover over a circle or curve to highlight it and its terms.

There is a connection between Farey sequence and Ford circles.

For every fraction p/q (in its lowest terms) there is a Ford circle C[p/q], which is the circle with radius $\tfrac{1}{2q^2}$ and centre at $\bigl(\tfrac{p}{q}, \tfrac{1}{2q^2}\bigr).$ Two Ford circles for different fractions are either disjoint or they are tangent to one another—two Ford circles never intersect. If 0 < p/q < 1 then the Ford circles that are tangent to C[p/q] are precisely the Ford circles for fractions that are neighbours of p/q in some Farey sequence.

Thus C[2/5] is tangent to C[1/2], C[1/3], C[3/7], C[3/8], etc.

Ford circles appear also in the Apollonian gasket (0,0,1,1). The picture below illustrates this together with Farey resonance lines.

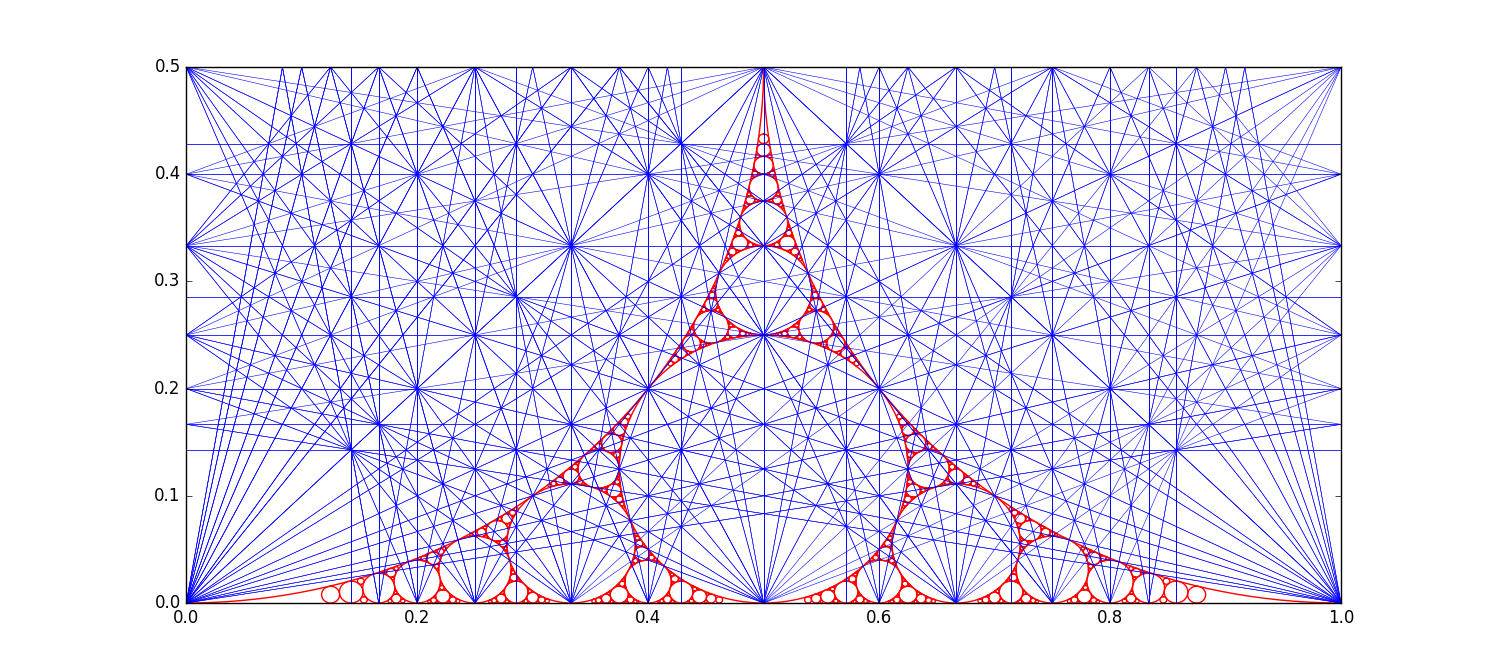
Apollonian gasket (0,0,1,1) and the Farey resonance diagram.

=== Riemann hypothesis ===
Farey sequences are used in two equivalent formulations of the Riemann hypothesis. Suppose the terms of F_{n} are $\{a_{k,n} : k = 0, 1, \ldots, m_n\}.$ Define $d_{k,n} = a_{k,n} - \tfrac{k}{m_n},$ in other words $d_{k,n}$ is the difference between the kth term of the nth Farey sequence, and the kth member of a set of the same number of points, distributed evenly on the unit interval. In 1924 Jérôme Franel proved that the statement

$$\sum_{k=1}^{m_n} d_{k,n}^2 = O (n^r) \quad \forall r > -1$$

is equivalent to the Riemann hypothesis, and then Edmund Landau remarked (just after Franel's paper) that the statement
$$\sum_{k=1}^{m_n} |d_{k,n}| = O (n^r) \quad \forall r > \frac{1}{2}$$

is also equivalent to the Riemann hypothesis. An unconditional upper bound of this sum is directly established from the fact that $|d_{k,n}|\leq 1/n$ as

$$\sum_{k=1}^{m_n} |d_{k,n}| \leq \frac{3}{\pi^2}  n  + O(\log n).$$

An unconditional lower bound is established using the known gap distribution of the Farey sequence as

$$\sum_{k=1}^{m_n} |d_{k,n}| \geq
\frac{9}{\pi^2(\pi^2-3)}\left( \log \left(\frac{3n}{\pi^2}\right) + \gamma - \frac{\zeta'(2)}{\zeta(2)} - \frac{6}{\pi^2}+\frac{9}{2\pi^4}\right) +  O\!\left(\frac{\log n}{n}\right)
,$$

where $\zeta(x)$ is the Riemann zeta function and $\gamma$ is Euler's constant.

=== Other sums involving Farey fractions ===
The sum of all Farey fractions of order n is half the number of elements:
$$\sum_{r\in F_n} r = \frac{1}{2} |F_n| .$$

The sum of the denominators in the Farey sequence is twice the sum of the numerators and relates to Euler's totient function:

$$\sum_{a/b \in F_n} b = 2 \sum_{a/b \in F_n} a = 1 + \sum_{i=1}^{n} i\varphi(i) ,$$

which was conjectured by Harold L. Aaron in 1962 and demonstrated by Jean A. Blake in 1966. A one line proof of the Harold L. Aaron conjecture is as follows. The sum of the numerators is
$$1 + \sum_{2 \le b \le n} \ \sum_{(a,b)=1} a = 1 + \sum_{2 \le b \le n} b\frac{\varphi(b)}{2}.$$
The sum of denominators is
$$2 + \sum_{2 \le b \le n} \ \sum_{(a,b)=1} b  = 2 + \sum_{2 \le b \le n} b\varphi(b).$$
The quotient of the first sum by the second sum is 1/2.

Let b_{j} be the ordered denominators of F_{n}, then:

$$\sum_{j=0}^{|F_n|-1} \frac{b_j}{b_{j+1}} = \frac{3|F_n|-4}{2}$$
and
$$\sum_{j=0}^{|F_n|-1} \frac{1}{b_{j+1}b_{j}} = 1.$$

Let $\tfrac{a_j}{b_j}$ be the jth Farey fraction in F_{n}, then
$$\sum_{j=1}^{|F_n|-1} (a_{j-1}b_{j+1} - a_{j+1}b_{j-1})
= \sum_{j=1}^{|F_n|-1} \begin{Vmatrix}
a_{j-1} & a_{j+1} \\
b_{j-1} & b_{j+1}
\end{Vmatrix} = 3(|F_n|-1) - 2n - 1,$$

which is demonstrated in. Also according to this reference the term inside the sum can be expressed in many different ways:
$$a_{j-1} b_{j+1} - a_{j+1} b_{j-1} = \frac{b_{j-1}+b_{j+1}}{b_{j}} = \frac{a_{j-1}+a_{j+1}}{a_{j}} = \left\lfloor\frac{n+ b_{j-1}}{b_{j}} \right\rfloor,$$

obtaining thus many different sums over the Farey elements with same result. Using the symmetry around 1/2 the former sum can be limited to half of the sequence as

$$\sum_{j=1}^{\left\lfloor \frac{|F_n|}{2} \right\rfloor} (a_{j-1} b_{j+1} - a_{j+1} b_{j-1}) = \frac{3(|F_n|-1)}{2} - n - \left\lceil \frac{n}{2} \right\rceil ,$$

The Mertens function can be expressed as a sum over Farey fractions as
$$M(n)= -1+ \sum_{a\in \mathcal{F}_n} e^{2\pi i a}$$
where $\mathcal{F}_n$ is the Farey sequence of order n.

This formula is used in the proof of the Franel–Landau theorem.

== Next term ==
A surprisingly simple algorithm exists to generate the terms of F_{n} in either traditional order (ascending) or non-traditional order (descending). The algorithm computes each successive entry in terms of the previous two entries using the mediant property given above. If a/b and c/d are the two given entries, and p/q is the unknown next entry, then c/d = (a + p)/(b + q). Since c/d is in lowest terms, there must be an integer k such that kc = a + p and kd = b + q, giving p = kc − a and q = kd − b. If we consider p and q to be functions of k, then

$$\frac{p(k)}{q(k)}- \frac{c}{d} = \frac{cb - da}{d(kd - b)}$$

so the larger k gets, the closer p/q gets to c/d.

To give the next term in the sequence k must be as large as possible, subject to kd − b ≤ n (as we are only considering numbers with denominators not greater than n), so k is the greatest integer ≤ (n + b)/d. Putting this value of k back into the equations for p and q gives

$$p = \left\lfloor\frac{n+b}{d}\right\rfloor c - a$$
$$q = \left\lfloor\frac{n+b}{d}\right\rfloor d - b$$

This is implemented in Python as follows:

from fractions import Fraction
from collections.abc import Generator

def farey_sequence(n: int, descending: bool = False) -> Generator[Fraction]:
    """
    Print the n'th Farey sequence. Allow for either ascending or descending.

    >>> print(*farey_sequence(5), sep=' ')
    0 1/5 1/4 1/3 2/5 1/2 3/5 2/3 3/4 4/5 1
    """
    a, b, c, d = 0, 1, 1, n
    if descending:
        a, c = 1, n - 1
    yield Fraction(a, b)
    while 0 <= c <= n:
        k = (n + b) // d
        a, b, c, d = c, d, k * c - a, k * d - b
        yield Fraction(a, b)

Brute-force searches for solutions to Diophantine equations in rationals can often take advantage of the Farey series (to search only reduced forms). While this code uses the first two terms of the sequence to initialize a, b, c, and d, one could substitute any pair of adjacent terms in order to exclude those less than (or greater than) a particular threshold.

== See also ==
- ABACABA pattern
- Stern–Brocot tree
- Euler's totient function
- Calkin–Wilf tree
