= Semicircle law (quantum Hall effect) =

The semicircle law, in condensed matter physics, is a mathematical relationship that occurs between quantities measured in the quantum Hall effect. It describes a relationship between the anisotropic and isotropic components of the macroscopic conductivity tensor σ, and, when plotted, appears as a semicircle.

The semicircle law was first described theoretically in Dykhne and Ruzin's analysis of the quantum Hall effect as a mixture of 2 phases: a free electron gas, and a free hole gas. Mathematically, it states that
$$\sigma_{xx}^2+(\sigma_{xy}-\sigma_{xy}^0)^2=(\sigma_{xx}^0)^2$$
where σ is the mean-field Hall conductivity, and σ^{0} is a parameter that encodes the classical conductivity of each phase. A similar law also holds for the resistivity.

A convenient reformulation of the law mixes conductivity and resistivity:
$$\sigma_{xy}^0=\frac{\rho_{xy}^0}{(\rho_{xy}^0)^2+(\rho_{xx}^0)^2}=\frac{e^2}{h}\left(n+\frac{1}{2}\right)$$
where n is an integer, the Hall divisor.

Although Dykhne and Ruzin's original analysis assumed little scattering, an assumption that proved empirically unsound, the law holds in the coherent-transport limits commonly observed in experiment.

Theoretically, the semicircle law originates from a representation of the modular group Γ_{0}(2), which describes a symmetry between different Hall phases. (Note that this is not a symmetry in the conventional sense; there is no conserved current.) That group's strong connections to number theory also appear: Hall phase transitions (in a single layer) exhibit a selection rule
$$|pq'-p'q|=1$$
that also governs the Farey sequence. Indeed, plots of the semicircle law are also Farey diagrams.

In striped quantum Hall phases, the relationship is slightly more complex, because of the broken symmetry:
$$\begin{cases}
\sigma_1 \sigma_2 +(\sigma_h - \sigma^0_h)^2=(e^2/(2h))^2 \\
\sigma^0_h = (N + 1/2) e^2 / h
\end{cases}$$
Here σ_{1} and σ_{2} describe the macroscopic conductivity in directions aligned with and perpendicular to the stripes.
