= Achille Brocot =

French clockmaker and amateur mathematician (1817–1878)

Louis Achille Brocot (pronounced "broco") (11 July 1817 – 19 January 1878) was a French clockmaker and amateur mathematician.

He is known for his discovery (contemporaneously with, but independently of, German number theorist Moritz Stern) of the Stern–Brocot tree, a mathematical structure useful in approximating real numbers by rational numbers; this sort of approximation is an important part of the design of gear ratios for clocks.

Several improvements in clock design were attributed to Brocot. He invented the "Brocot Suspension", which enabled time keeping to be regulated by altering the length of the pendulum suspension spring by a key turned in the dial.

He also made many practical horological innovations including refinement of his father Louis-Gabriel's Brocot escapement and the development of clocks with perpetual calendar mechanisms. In order to commercially exploit his original designs, together with Jean-Baptiste Delettrez he established the clockmaking company "Brocot & Delettrez" in Paris on 20 October 1851, a partnership that would continue until his death.
