= Gaston Sant Blanc =

French watchmaker

Gaston Sant Blanc (1759–1820) was a self-educated French watchmaker, the founder of the Sant Blanc watch and jewelry company.
