= Newgate Street =

Newgate Street refers to:

- Newgate and Newgate Street in London
- Newgate Street, Hertfordshire, a village in Hertfordshire
- Newgate Street, Newcastle, a shopping and entertainment street in Newcastle upon Tyne

== See also ==
- Newgate (disambiguation)
