= Neil J. Calkin =

English mathematician

Neil Calkin
- Born: Neil James Calkin; 29 March 1961 (age 65); Hartford, Connecticut, US
- Education: Trinity College, Cambridge; University of Waterloo (PhD in 1988)
- Known for: Calkin–Wilf tree Electronic Journal of Combinatorics
- Scientific career
- Workplaces: Clemson University; Georgia Tech; Carnegie Mellon University
- Doctoral advisor: Ian Goulden

Neil J. Calkin (born 29 March 1961) is a professor at Clemson University in the Algebra and Discrete Mathematics group of the School of Mathematical and Statistical Sciences. His interests are in combinatorial and probabilistic methods, mainly as applied to number theory.

Together with Herbert Wilf he founded The Electronic Journal of Combinatorics in 1994. He and Wilf developed the Calkin–Wilf tree and the associated Calkin–Wilf sequence.

== Biography ==
Neil Calkin was born 29 March 1961, in Hartford, Connecticut and moved to the UK around the age of 3. He grew up there and studied mathematics at Trinity College Cambridge before moving to Canada in 1984 to study in the Department of Combinatorics and Optimization at the University of Waterloo where he was awarded a PhD (1988) for his thesis "Sum-Free Sets and Measure Spaces" written under the supervision of Ian Peter Goulden.

He was the Zeev Nehari Visiting Assistant Professor of Mathematics at Carnegie Mellon University (1988—1991), an assistant professor at Georgia Tech (1991—1997), and joined the Algebra and Discrete Mathematics group of the School of Mathematical and Statistical Sciences at Clemson University in 1997.

Calkin has an Erdős number of 1. He was one of the last people to collaborate with Erdős and once said of him, "One of my greatest regrets is that I didn't know him when he was a million times faster than most people. When I knew him he was only hundreds of times faster."

== Selected papers ==
- Calkin, Neil J.; Wilf, Herbert S. (1998). "The Number of Independent Sets in a Grid Graph". SIAM Journal on Discrete Mathematics. 11 (1). Society for Industrial & Applied Mathematics (SIAM): 54–60. doi:10.1137/s089548019528993x. hdl:1853/31277. ISSN 0895-4801.
- Calkin, Neil; Wilf, Herbert S. (2000). "Recounting the Rationals". The American Mathematical Monthly. 107 (4). Informa UK Limited: 360–363. doi:10.1080/00029890.2000.12005205. ISSN 0002-9890. S2CID 38140675.
- Calkin, Neil J.; Davis, Killian; Haithcock, Evan; Kenyon, Catherine M.; Wu, Sylvia (21 October 2021). "What Newton Might Have Known: Experimental Mathematics in the Classroom". The American Mathematical Monthly. 128 (9). Informa UK Limited: 845–855. doi:10.1080/00029890.2021.1964274. ISSN 0002-9890. S2CID 243765436.
- Neil j. Calkin; Beth Novick; Hayato Ushijima-Mwesigwa (2016). "What Moser Could Have Asked: Counting Hamilton Cycles in Tournaments". The American Mathematical Monthly. 123 (4). Informa UK Limited: 382. arXiv:1506.00699. doi:10.4169/amer.math.monthly.123.4.382. ISSN 0002-9890. S2CID 119324841.

== Books ==
- Bailey, David H. (2007). Experimental mathematics in action. Wellesley, Mass.: A.K. Peters. ISBN 978-1-56881-271-7. OCLC 70823291.
