= Jean-Baptiste Delettrez =

French clockmaker

(Antoine) Jean-Baptiste Delettrez (1 May 1816 – 25 May 1887) was a 19th-century French clockmaker.

Delettrez and Achille Brocot, son of the respected clockmaker Louis-Gabriel Brocot, established the clockmaking company "Brocot et Delettrez" in Paris on 20 October 1851, with premises at 62 Rue Charlot. Delettrez worked alongside Achille Brocot for several years and their clock movements are considered to be the most effective made during the late 19th century. Their specialty was a range of clocks based on the innovations of Brocot père and his other son Antoine, but generally of Achille's greatly advanced original design, some having a unique single-arm double-wheel escapement, some having a temperature-compensated pendulum, some having two dials, one of which showed the time and the other which showed a calendar and often other information such as phases of the moon, times of sunrise & sunset in Paris, etc. The firm was awarded a 1st class prize at the Paris World Exposition of 1857 for a commercial clock of this type.

This innovative and fruitful partnership continued until the death of Brocot fils in 1878, after which event Delettrez continued on his own. His typical later product was a conventional 8-day mantle clock that struck the hours and half-hours, still based on the standard Brocot escapement and suspension that he had helped to refine. These elegant and much-admired timepieces were typically made to order for retailers, including several in Britain, with dials carrying the name of the retailer rather than that of their maker, but whose mechanism was stamped with the cartouche (JBD).

He married his cousin Caroline Delettrez in Paris on 2 April 1845. They had two sons, Louis and Jules, both of whom later carried on the family tradition of metalworking, the former as a manufacturer of bronze objets d'art and the latter as a goldsmith.
