= Moritz Abraham Stern =

German mathematician (1807–1894)

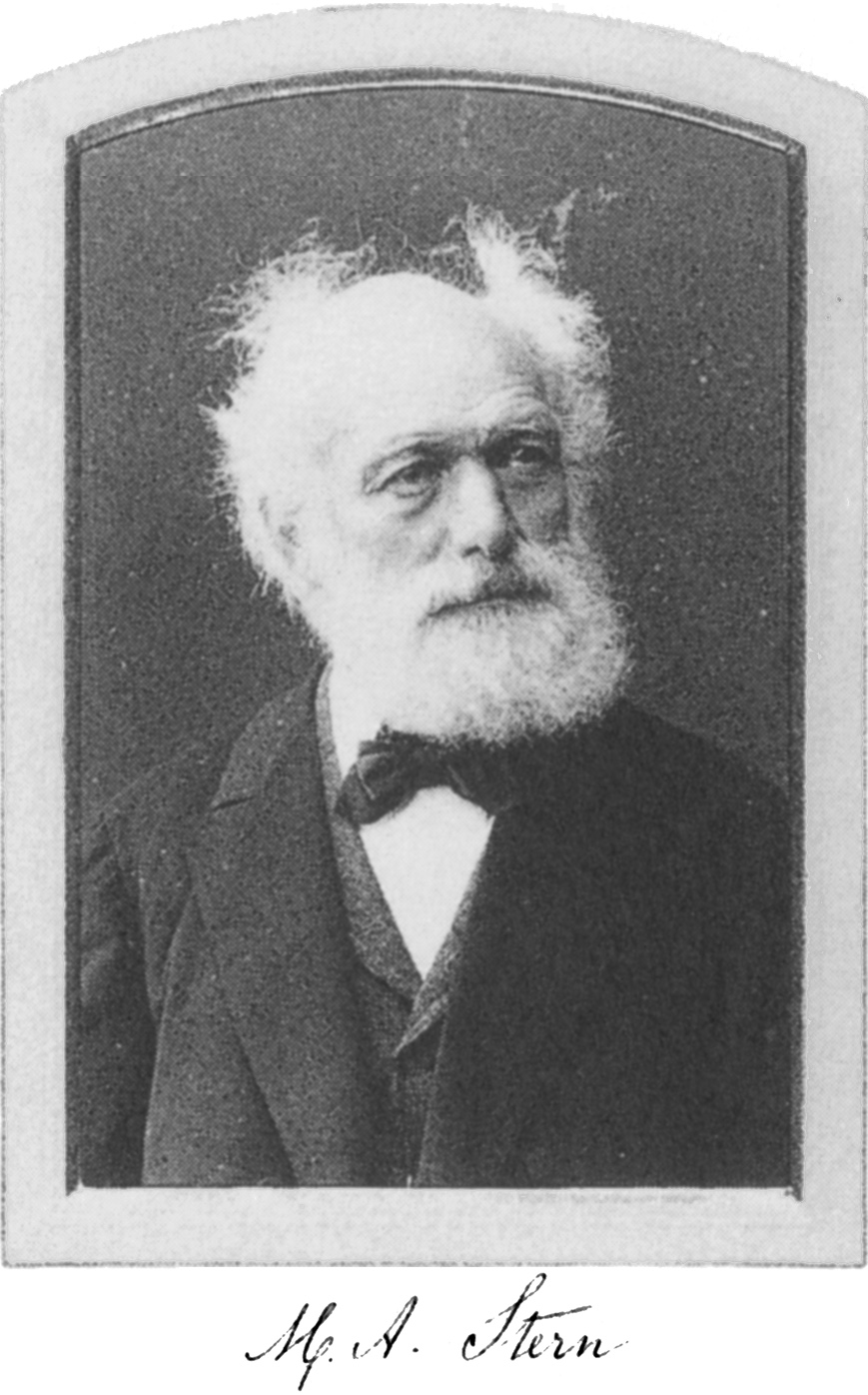
- Born: 29 June 1807; Frankfurt
- Died: 30 January 1894 (aged 86); Zurich
- Known for: Stern's diatomic sequence Stern primes Stern–Brocot tree
- Scientific career
- Fields: Mathematics
- Institutions: University of Göttingen
- Doctoral advisor: Bernhard Friedrich Thibaut; Carl Friedrich Gauss
- Notable students: Bernhard Riemann; Ferdinand Eisenstein

Moritz Abraham Stern (29 June 1807 – 30 January 1894) was a German mathematician. Stern became Ordinarius (full professor) at Göttingen University in 1858, succeeding Carl Friedrich Gauss. Stern was the first Jewish full professor at a German university who attained the position without changing his Jewish religion. Although Carl Gustav Jacobi preceded him (by three decades) as the first Jew to obtain a math professorial chair in Germany, Jacobi's family had converted to Christianity long before then.

As a professor, Stern taught Gauss's student Bernhard Riemann. Stern was very helpful to Gotthold Eisenstein in formulating a proof of the quadratic reciprocity theorem. Stern was interested in primes that cannot be expressed as the sum of a prime and twice a square (now known as Stern primes).

He is known for formulating Stern's diatomic series

1, 1, 2, 1, 3, 2, 3, 1, 4, … (sequence A002487 in the OEIS)

that counts the number of ways to write a number as a sum of powers of two with no power used more than twice.

He is also known for the Stern–Brocot tree, which he wrote about in 1858 and which Brocot independently discovered in 1861.
