= Antoine Cronier =

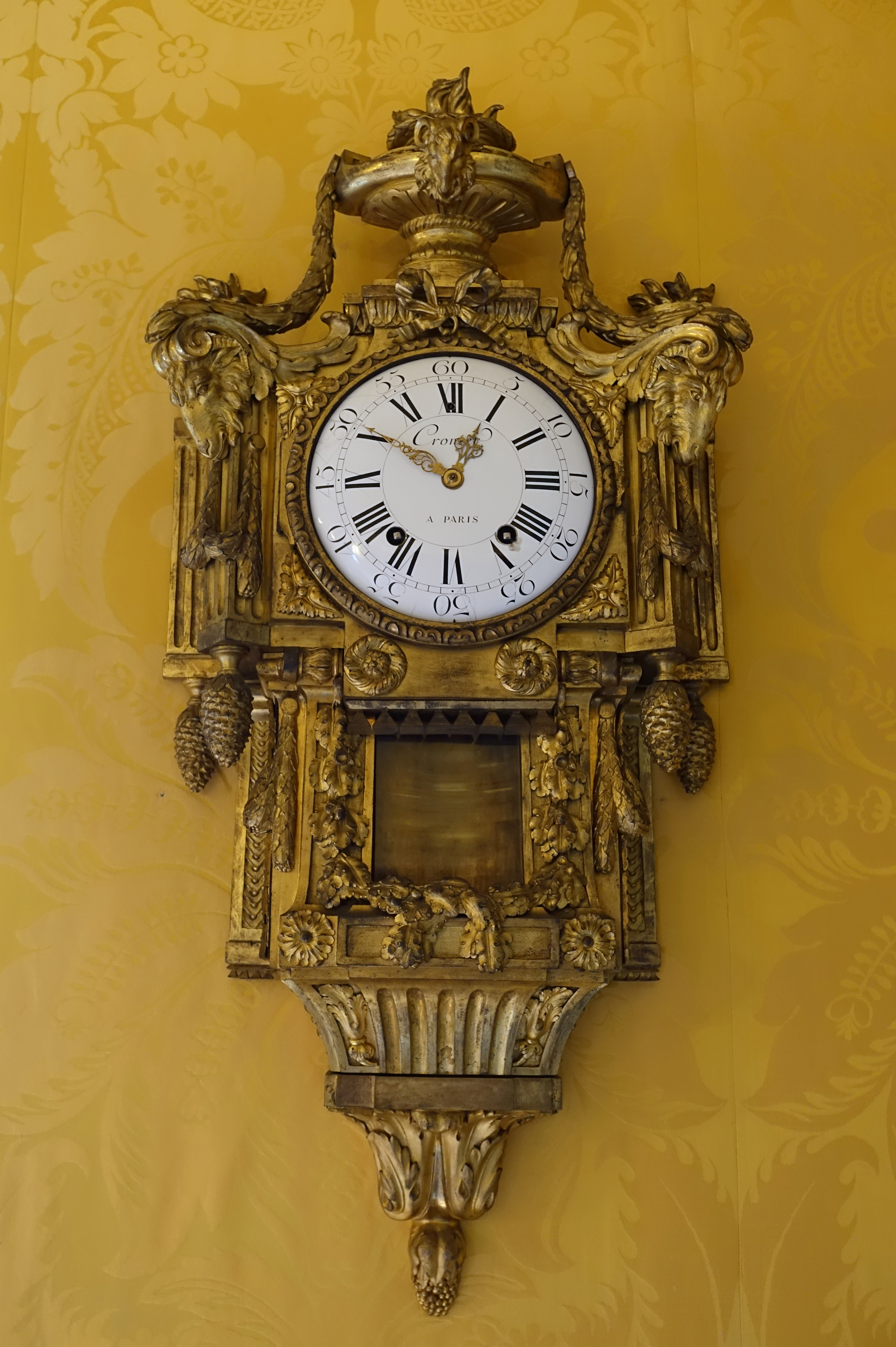
Clock by Antoine Cronier in Harewood House

Antoine Cronier, or Crosnier, (13 January 1732 - after 1806) was a noted clockmaker active during the second half of the 18th century in Paris, France.

Cronier was born in Paris to Françoise née Boulard and Charles Crosnier. He began his apprenticeship under Nicolas Pierre Thuillier in 1745, and by 1753 was working independently, with his workshop opening by 1759 at rue Saint-Honoré, 140. In 1763, he was recognized as a maître-horloger. His clocks used bronzes by Robert and Jean-Baptiste Osmond, Edmé Roy, René François Morlay, Nicolas Bonnet, and François Vion, and cases by cabinetmakers Jean-Pierre Latz, Balthazar Lieutaud, and François Goyer. He also worked with gilder Honoré Noël and tapissier Nicolas Leclerc.

Today his clocks are in museum collections including the Royal Collection of the United Kingdom, Musée Nissim de Camondo, Waddesdon Manor, Harewood House, the Residenzmuseum in Munich, the Neue Residenz Bamberg, the Royal Palace of Turin, the Royal Museums of Art and History in Brussels, the Nationalmuseet in Stockholm, the Huntington Library, the Pavlovsk Palace the Boston Museum of Fine Arts, and the Detroit Institute of Arts Museum.
