= Florn =

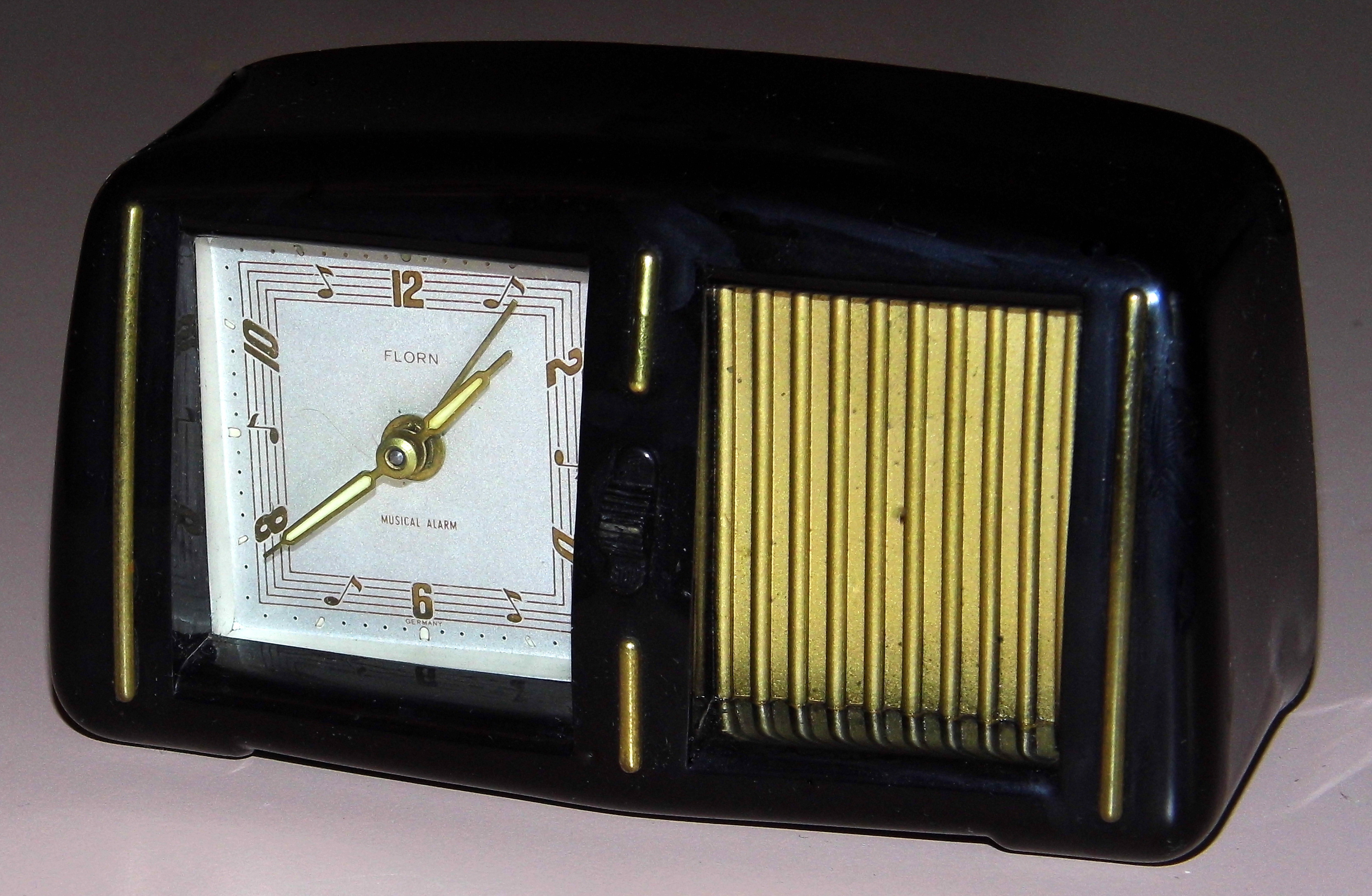
A Florn musical alarm clock

Florn was a German company which made small manual travel and desk alarm clocks. Most examples are “clam” or “oyster” compact styles for travel. The clocks were made beginning from at least 1936.
