= Newgate Education Center =

Coordinates: 44.990989°N 93.211968°W

Newgate School

Location
- 2900 East Hennepin Avenue; Minneapolis, MN 55413

Information
- School type: non-profit, vocational-technical
- Phone: 612 378-0177
- Website: newgateschool.org

Newgate School is a post-secondary non-profit automotive technical school providing tuition-free automotive technical training and career placement support for underserved young adults in the Twin Cities and surrounding areas. It offers professional automotive technical certification in both Auto Body repair and Auto Mechanics. Graduates are qualified to work as career apprentices in the auto services industry. Newgate’s practical, hands-on approach to teaching technical skills is highly successful with students who struggle in traditional educational settings or for whom English is a second language. In 1981, Newgate pioneered the concept of using the sales of car donations as the single funding source for the school, thereby eliminating the dependence on tax-based government funding for support. Newgate began its Wheels for Women Program in 1996. Donated cars are repaired by the students and provided at no cost to single moms who qualify for the program. Newgate provides approximately 35 cars per year through the Wheels program. In 2004, with bonds financed by the City of Minneapolis, the school constructed a new modern training facility and expanded its Auto Mechanics Training program.

== History ==
Newgate School was created in the early 1970s in partnership with the University of Minnesota. In 1975 it was incorporated as a separate non-profit school. In 1979, assisted by the Northwest Area Foundation, Newgate purchased a mechanics garage at 90 North Dale St in St Paul and established the Auto Body Training Center, serving young adults who had dropped out of school. Twelve years later, Newgate purchased its current property at 2900 East Hennepin Minneapolis, MN 55413. Ron Severson, the school founder and director expressed the school’s admission policy: "If you don't have a high school diploma, some places won't take you as a student. We don't care about that. We're looking at ability and attitude.” Newgate also welcomed Hmong Americans, immigrants for whom the Twin Cities was becoming one of the top two settlement areas in the US. Now almost all of Newgate’s cash-flow financing – educational materials, building operations and supplies, marketing and staff salaries – is provided by the sale of donated vehicles, many of which are repaired by the students in training.
