= Charles Cabrier II =

Notable London clock and scientific instrument maker

Charles Cabrier II (eighteenth century) was a notable London clock and scientific instrument maker.

== Biography ==
Charles Cabrier II, son of Charles I and father of Charles III, was the most prominent clockmaker of the three namesakes. The Cabriers were a celebrated dynasty of Huguenot clockmakers who settled in London after the Revocation of the Edict of Nantes (1685). A relatively large number of their clocks - built over a period of half a century - have survived.

Apprenticed in 1719, Charles Cabrier II joined the Clockmakers' Company in 1726; he was Master from 1757 to 1772. Many examples of his work, including table clocks, carriage clocks, and pocket watches, are preserved in collections and museums in Britain and America, Germany, Sweden, and Russia.

== Gallery ==
Clocks and watches by Charles Cabrier II

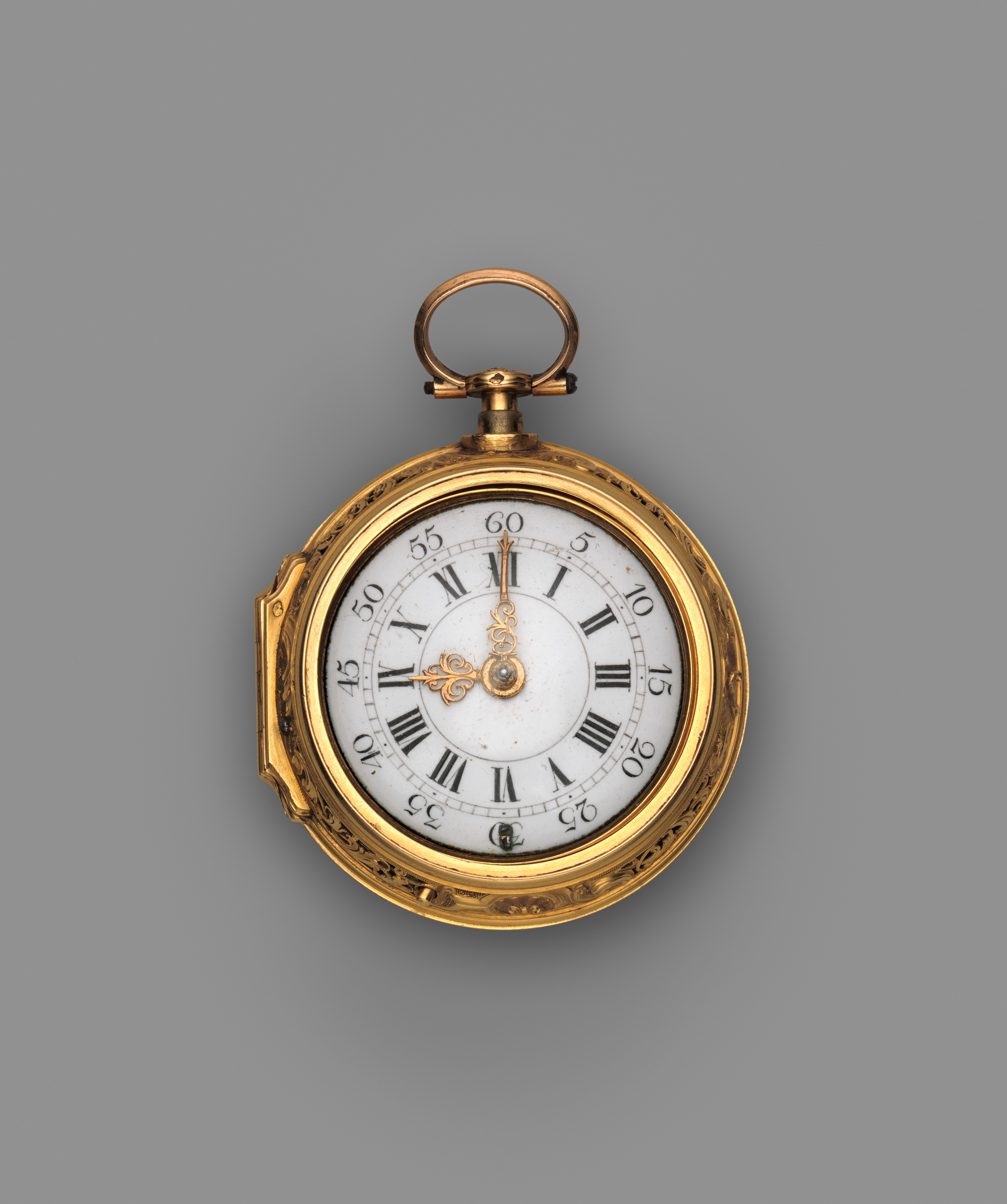

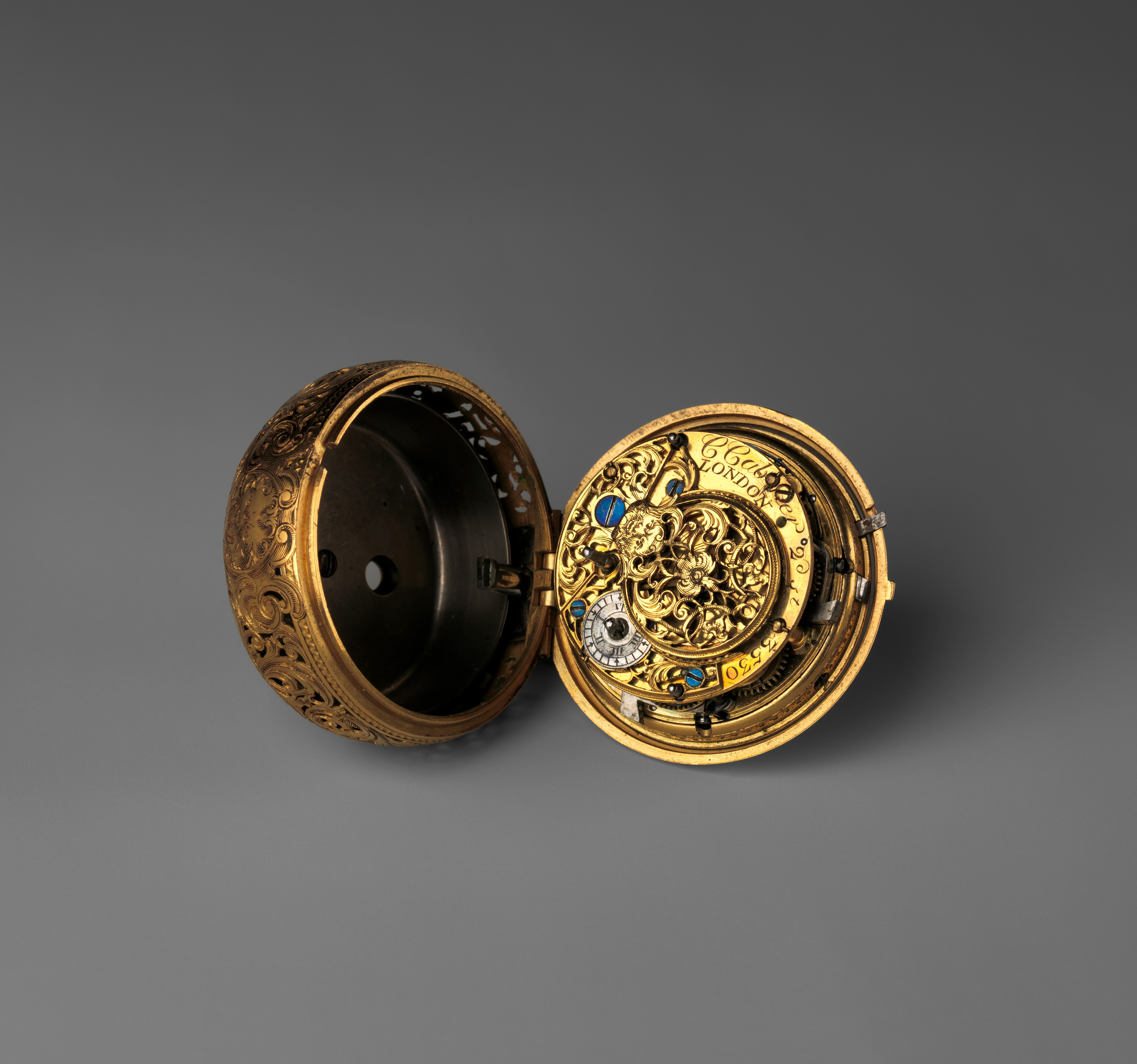

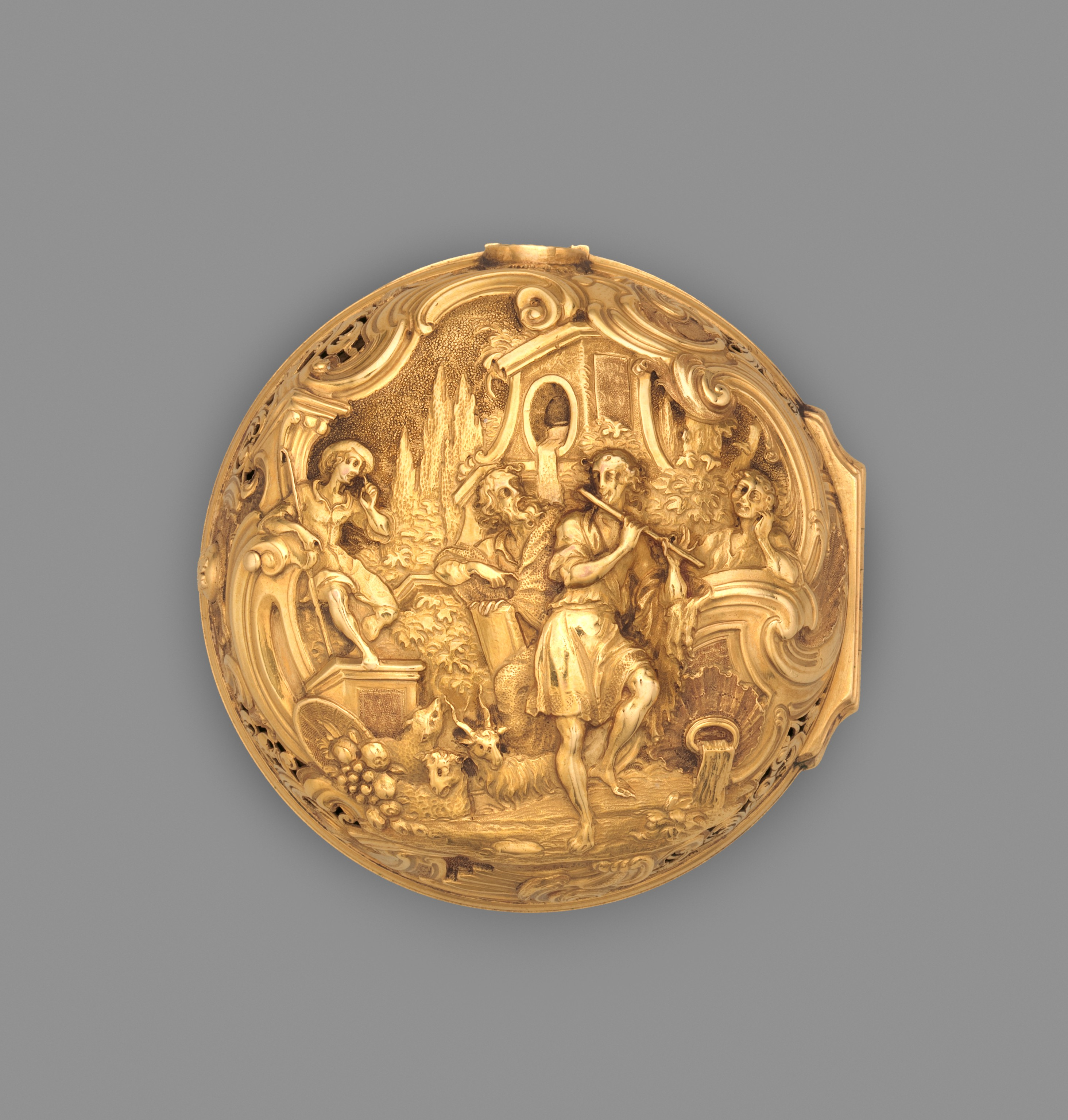

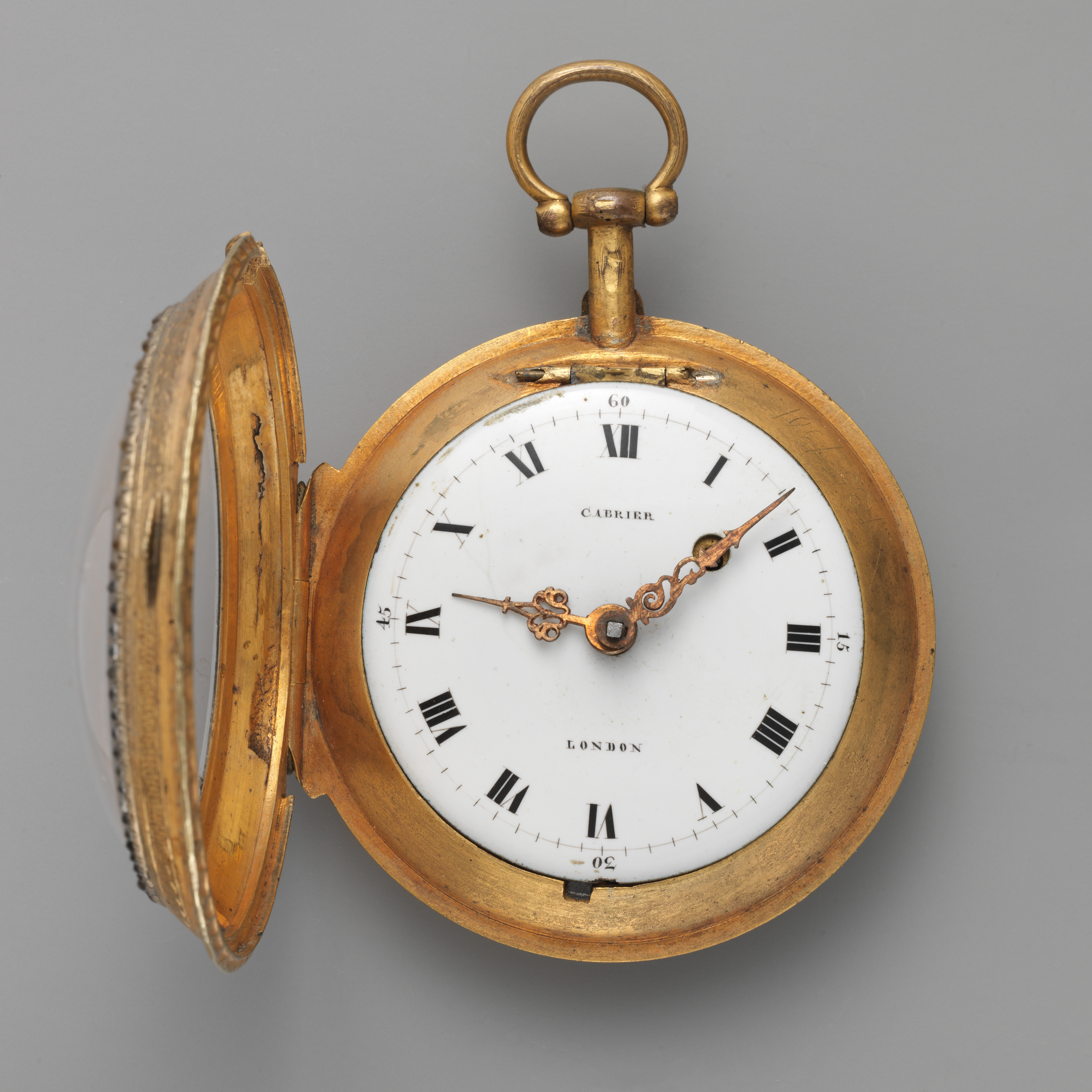

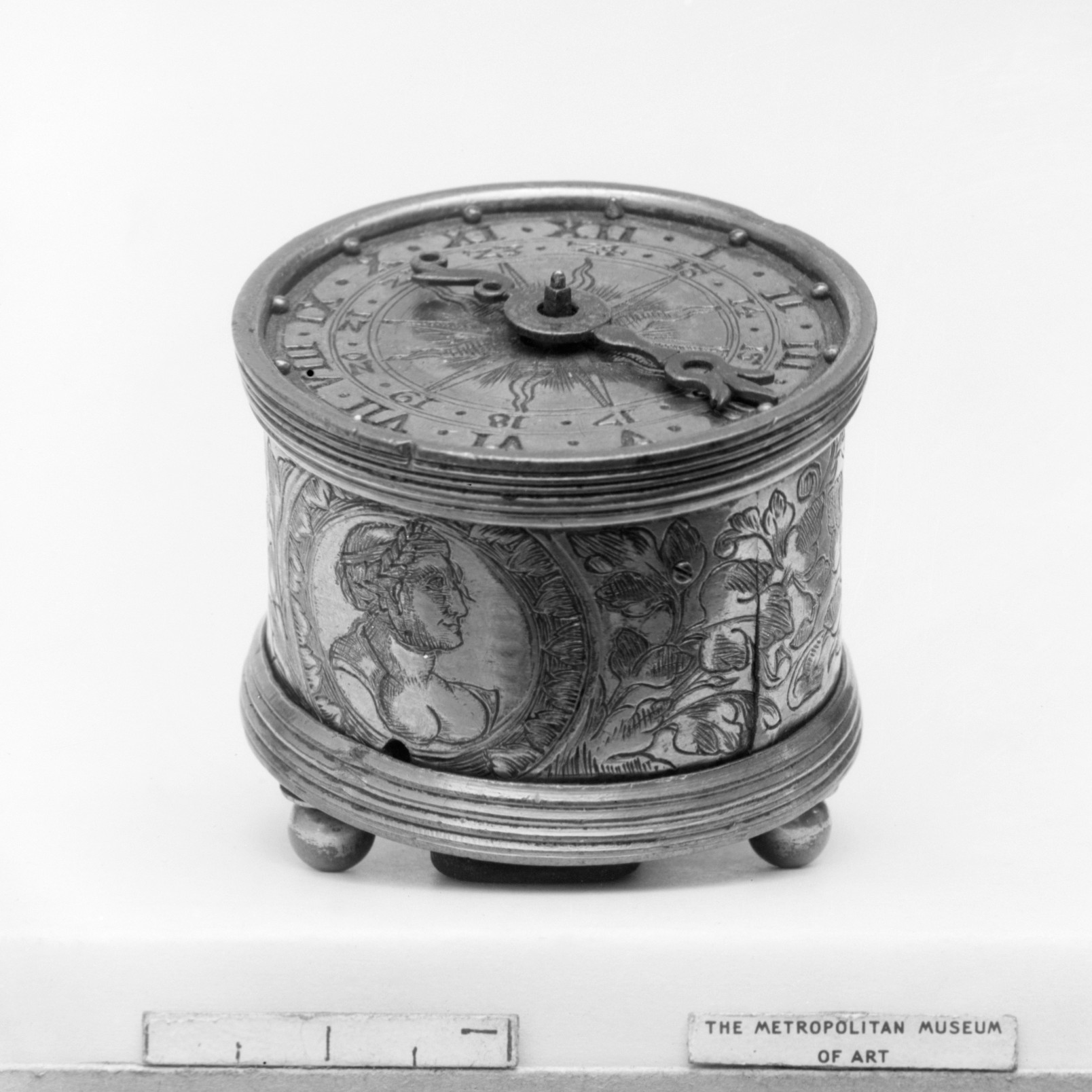

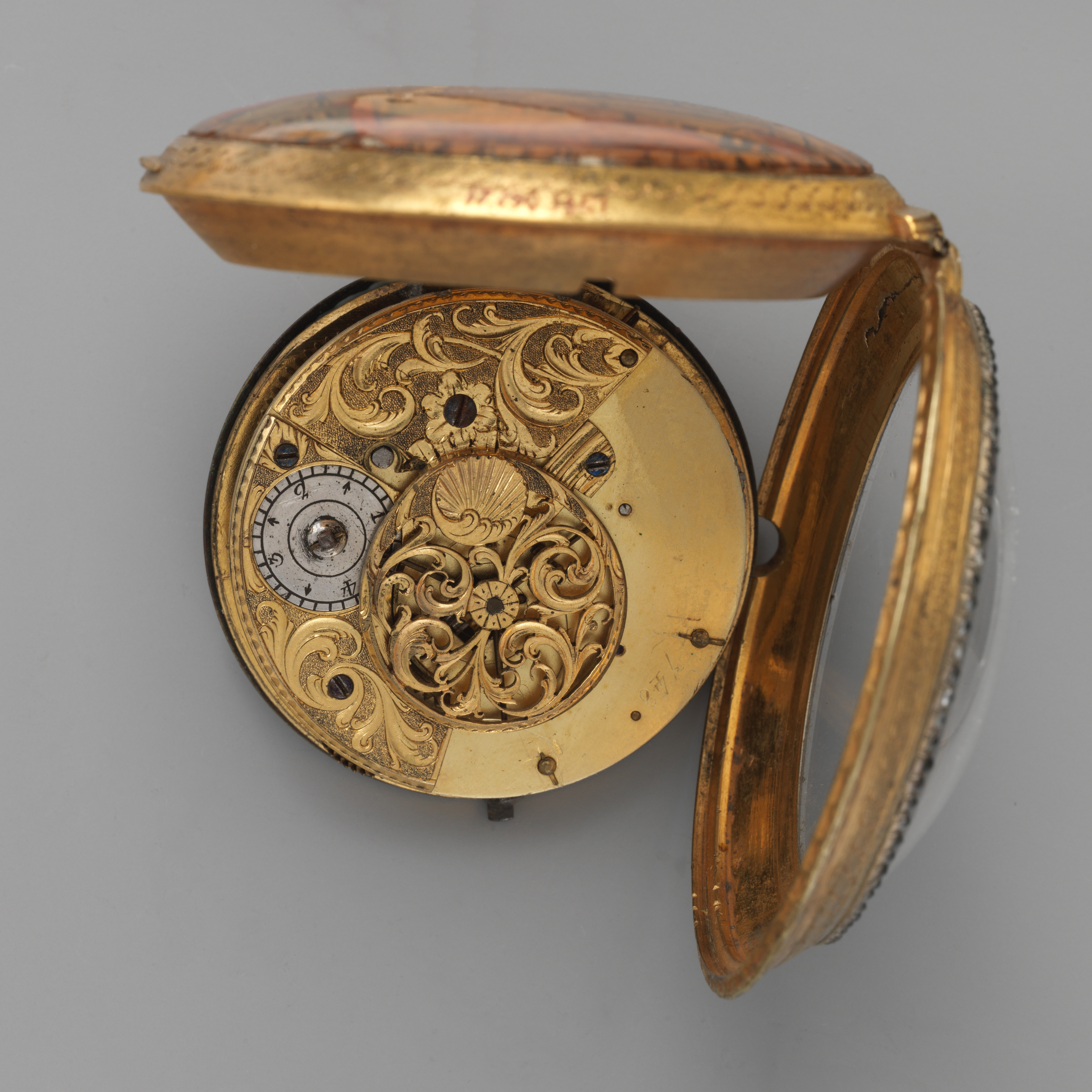
