= George Littlewort =

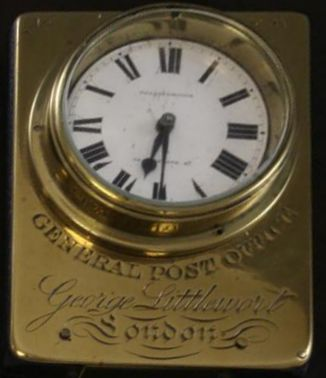
Early 19th century mail coachman's pocket watch, 10 cm.

George Littlewort (fl. 1826–48), was a chronometer and instrument maker operating from London, Bristol and Stroud. 17 Bridgewater Square and 4 Wilderness Row Goswell Rd., Middlesex.
