= Newgate (company) =

British clock and watch manufacturing company

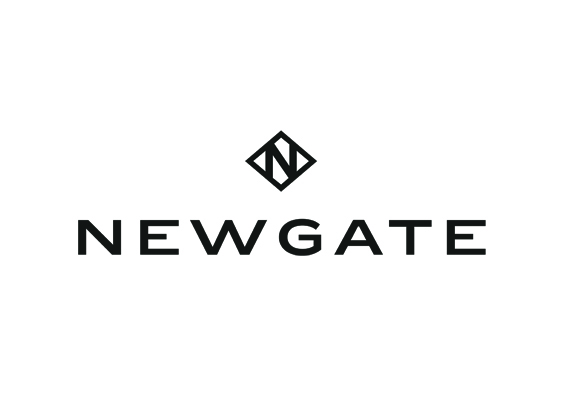
- Type: Private
- Industry: Retail
- Founded: 1991
- Headquarters: Oswestry, Shropshire, UK
- Key people: Jim Read (Managing director); Chloe Read (Managing director)
- Products: Clocks, watches
- Number of employees: 50
- Website: https://www.newgateworld.com/

Newgate clock

Newgate is a British clock manufacturing company headquartered in Oswestry, Shropshire. It produces a range of clocks as well as designing and producing eyewear under sister brand London Mole.

== Background ==
Newgate was founded in 1991 by Jim and Chloe Read. The name was inspired by the old New Gate Toll near their apartment and first home in Oswestry.

Following a trade exhibition at London's Alexandra Palace, the company began supplying retailers including Harrods and various European distributors.

In the 1990s, 75% of the clocks produced were exported around the world. Manufacturing moved from Oswestry to Asia in 2003.

In 2009, the company moved its headquarters and design studios to a refurbished factory in Oswestry.

== Jones Clocks ==
Sister brand Jones Clocks was launched in 2005, and is a fashion clock brand. Its products are sold to supermarkets and large home and DIY centres, and direct to consumer.

== Newgate Watches ==
In 2012, work started on a range of watches. The company launched a line of fifty watches at the 2015 Spring Fair in Birmingham. In 2016, the founders were included in the WatchPro Hot 100 list.

Newgate watches are sold worldwide through distributors like iWorld.

== London Mole ==
In 2019, the company launched the London Mole brand, which produces eyewear.
