= Clockmaker =

Artisan who makes and repairs clocks

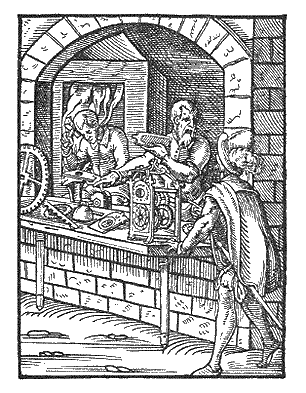
Woodcut of medieval clockmaker, 1568

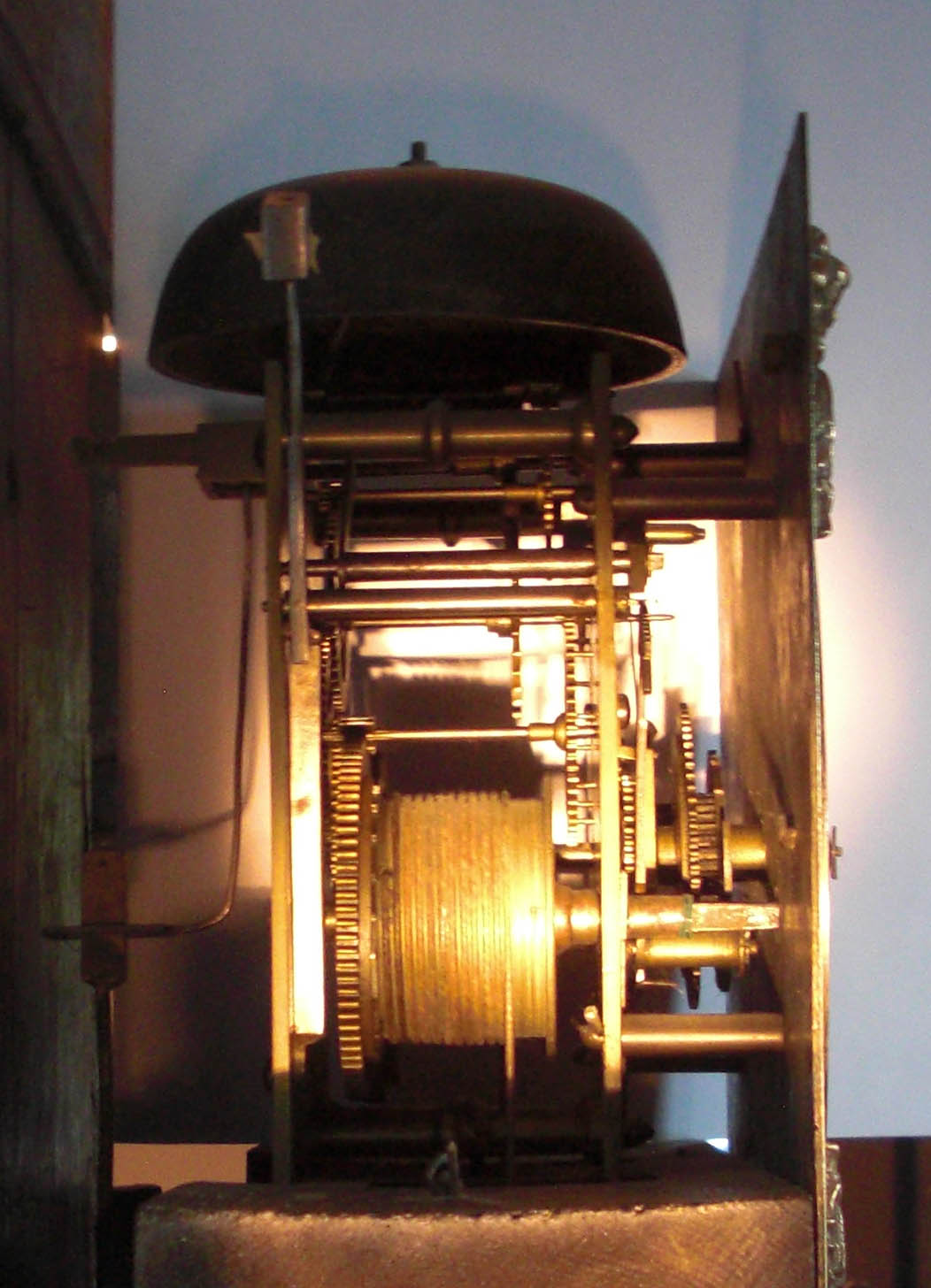
Lateral view of a Timothy Mason longcase clock movement with striking mechanism, c. 1730

A clockmaker is an artisan who makes and/or repairs clocks. Since almost all clocks are now factory-made, most modern clockmakers only repair clocks. Modern clockmakers may be employed by jewellers, antique shops, and places devoted strictly to repairing clocks and watches. Clockmakers must be able to read blueprints and instructions for numerous types of clocks and time pieces that vary from antique clocks to modern time pieces in order to fix and make clocks or watches. The trade requires fine motor coordination as clockmakers must frequently work on devices with small gears and fine machinery.

Originally, clockmakers were master craftsmen who designed and built clocks by hand. Since modern clockmakers are required to repair antique, handmade or one-of-a-kind clocks for which parts are not available, they must have some of the design and fabrication abilities of the original craftsmen. A qualified clockmaker can typically design and make a missing piece for a clock without access to the original component.

Clockmakers generally do not work on watches; the skills and tools required are different enough that watchmaking is a separate field, handled by another specialist, the watchmaker.

== Origins and specialities ==
The earliest use of the term clokkemaker is said to date from 1390, about a century after the first mechanical clocks appeared. From the beginning in the 15th century through the 17th century, clockmaking was considered the "leading edge", most technically advanced trade existing. Historically, the best clockmakers often also built scientific instruments, as for a long time they were the only craftsmen around trained in designing precision mechanical apparatus. In one example, the harmonica was invented by a young German clockmaker, which was then mass-produced by another clockmaker, Matthias Hohner.

Prior to 1800 clocks were entirely handmade, including all their parts, in a single shop under a master clockmaker. Examples of these complex movements can be seen in the many longcase clocks constructed in the 16th and 17th centuries. By the 19th century, clock parts were beginning to be made in small factories, but the skilled work of designing, assembling, and adjusting the clock was still done by clockmaking shops. By the 20th century, interchangeable parts and standardized designs allowed the entire clock to be assembled in factories, and clockmakers specialized in repair of clocks.

In Germany, Nuremberg and Augsburg were the early clockmaking centers, and the Black Forest came to specialize in wooden cuckoo clocks.

== Guilds ==
As the art of making clocks became more widespread and distinguished, guilds specifically for this trade emerged around the sixteenth century. One of the first guilds developed in London, England, known as the Worshipful Company of Clockmakers; the group formed after a small number of foreign-trained clockmakers spent time working in London. A requirement of joining the guild was to practise their craft and gain as much experience as possible, along with joining one of many other trade guilds, such as the Blacksmiths, Stationers, or Drapers Company. There are many guilds where clockmakers meet to buy, sell and get clocks to repair from customers, the IWJG is one of the most prominent in the world.

Quality control and standards were imposed on clockmakers by the Worshipful Company of Clockmakers, a guild which licensed clockmakers for doing business. By the rise of consumerism in the late 18th century, clocks, especially pocket watches, became regarded as fashion accessories and were made in increasingly decorative styles. By 1796, the industry reached a high point with almost 200,000 clocks being produced annually in London. However, by the mid-19th century the industry had gone into steep decline from Swiss competition. Switzerland established itself as a clockmaking center following the influx of Huguenot craftsmen, and in the 19th century the Swiss industry "gained worldwide supremacy in high-quality machine-made watches". The leading firm of the day was Patek Philippe founded by Antoni Patek of Warsaw and Adrien Philippe of Bern.

== Tools ==
Early clockmakers fashioned all the intricate parts and wheelwork of clocks by hand, using hand tools. They developed specialized tools to help them.

- Balance Truing Caliper: This device was used in fashioning the wheels and gearwork of the clock, to make sure the wheel, particularly the balance wheel was balanced and circular. The pivots of the wheel were mounted in the caliper. An index arm was moved next to the edge and the wheel was spun to see if the edge was true.
- Die/Screw Plate: The die plate was used to cut threads on small screws. It had a number of threaded die holes of different sizes for making different threads. A piece of wire was inserted in a hole and turned to cut a thread on the end. Then a head would be formed on the other end of the wire to make a screw.
- File: Hardened steel files were used to shape the metal before it was used to make and fit wheels or plates. There were many variations of files.
- Rivet Extracting Pliers: Made of brass or steel, rivet extracting pliers were used to remove rivets from assorted clock parts.
- Jeweler’s Piercing Saw: The blade of the saw was released by undoing the thumbscrew adjacent to the handle. To start an interior cut, a hole was drilled and the blade was inserted and reattached to the saw. This device was popular among clockmakers to repair the ends of clock hands.
- Staking tool: An iron vertical plunger was used with an array of stakes for placing rollers and balanced wheels on staffs.
- Turns: The "turns" was a small bow-operated lathe used for furbishing parts and for working gear blanks to size. During use, the device was clamped in a vise and the worker held a cutting or polishing tool on a tee-shaped tool rest with one hand, and shifted the bow back and forth to spin the part.
- Cross Peen Riveting Hammer: The flat end of the tool was for general use, whereas the radiused peen end was used for flattening rivet heads. This tool was used for forging, riveting, striking steel, etc.

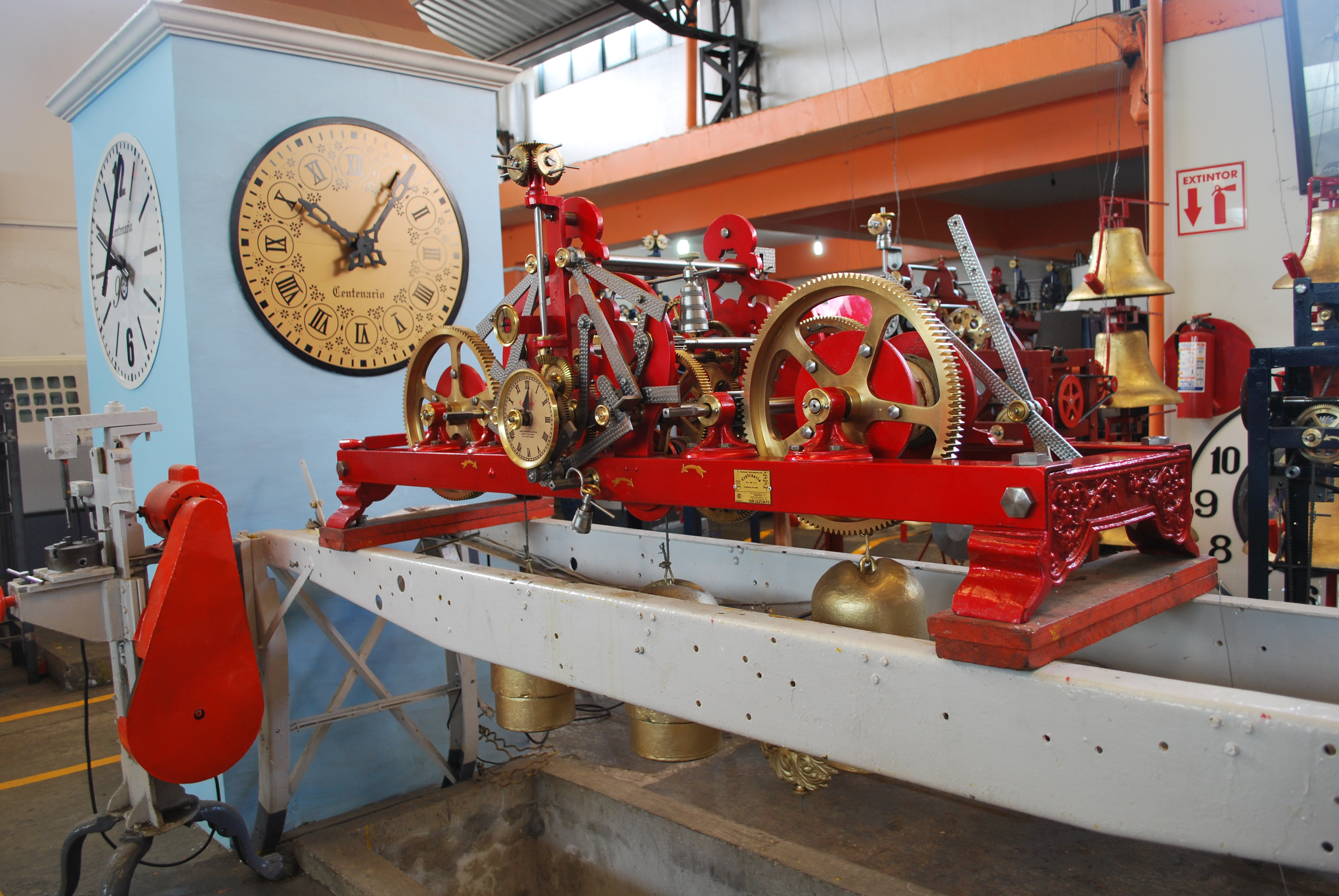
View inside the Relojes Centenario factory in Zacatlán, Puebla Mexico

== Other uses ==
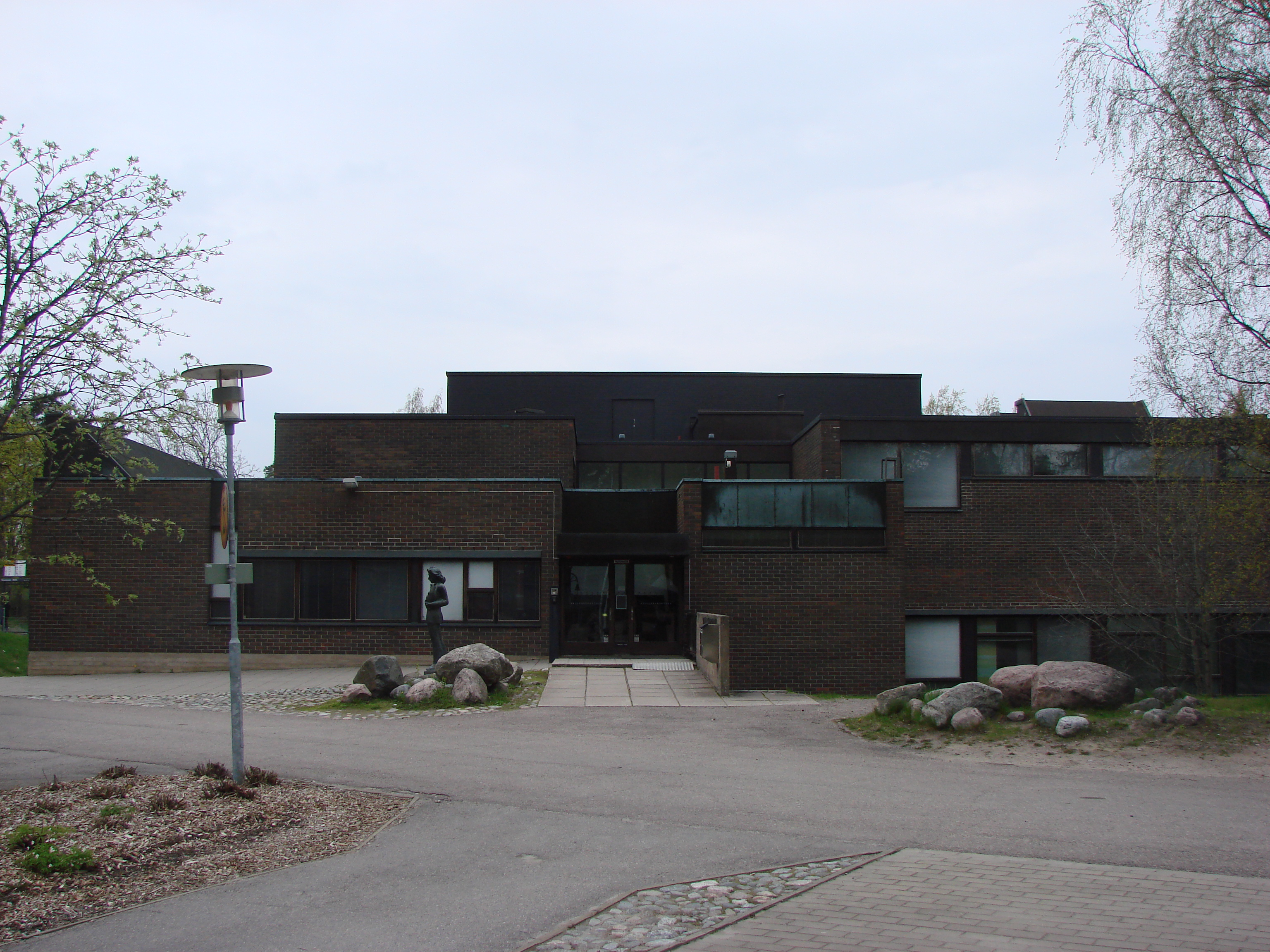
Finnish School of Watchmaking, Leppävaara, Espoo

Clockmaker is also the name of several movies.

Anglican clergymen like William Paley, John Ray, Thomas Burnet and William Derham all referred to God as or likened God to a clockmaker. The Temple of the Great Clockmaker, in the novel The Case Of The Dead Certainty by Kel Richards, is a temple which represents deism.

The Clock Maker Theory and the watchmaker analogy describe by way of analogy religious, philosophical, and theological opinions about the existence of god(s) that have been expressed over the years.

During the 1800s and 1900s, clocks or watches were carried around as a form of flaunting social status. They were also a way of instilling a sense of time regulation for work in the budding industrial market.

In 2004, Jim Krueger wrote a comic book entitled The Clock Maker, published by German publisher Image Publishing, that focuses on the life of a clockmaker.

Artist Tony Troy creates the Illustration titled "The Clockmaker" in 2003 for his Broadway musical "The Fluteplayer's Song".

== Historical clockmakers ==
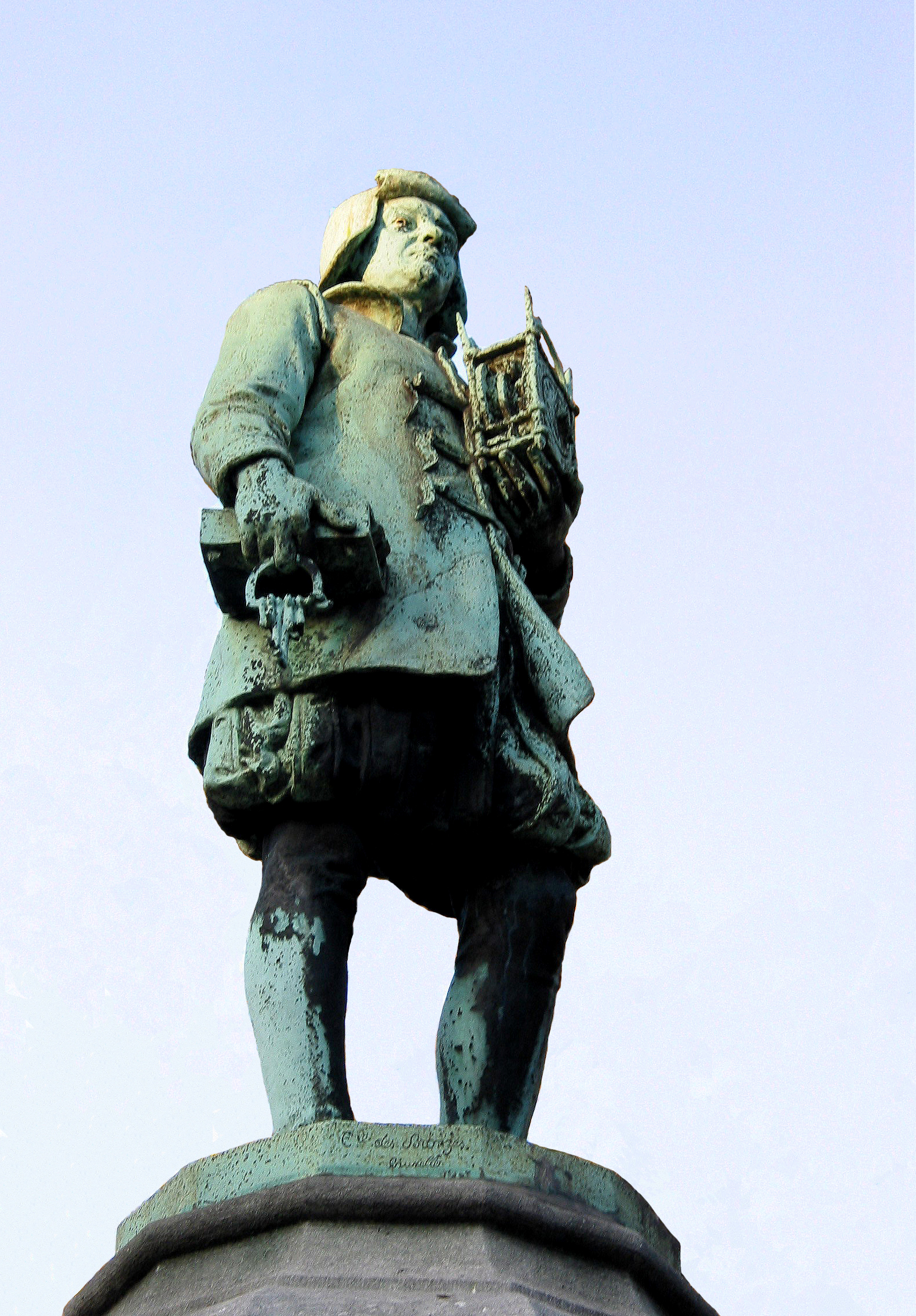
The statue of the clockmaker-locksmith (by Jean Cuypers – 19th century) – Brussels

- Aaron Lufkin Dennison, United Kingdom
- Abraham Louis Breguet, France and Switzerland
- Achille Brocot, France
- Adolf Scheibe, Germany
- Antide Janvier, France
- Antoine Cronier, Paris
- Benjamin Vulliamy, United Kingdom
- Charles Cabrier II, England
- Christiaan Huygens, Netherlands
- David Hare, Scottish philanthropist and pioneer of modern European Education in India
- David Rittenhouse, United States
- Eli Terry, United States
- Eugène Farcot, France
- Ferdinand Berthoud, France and Switzerland
- Franz Ketterer, Germany
- G Bernard Ramsdale, United Kingdom
- George Graham, United Kingdom
- Giovanni de Dondi, Italy
- Hans Düringer, Germany
- Humbertus Gallet, Switzerland
- J. B. Joyce & Company, United Kingdom
- James Ivory, United Kingdom
- Jean-Antoine Lépine, Franc
- Jens Olsen, Denmark
- Johann Andreas Klindworth, Germany
- Johann Baptist Beha, Germany
- John Alker, United Kingdom
- John Arnold, United Kingdom
- John Ellicott, United Kingdom
- John Harrison, United Kingdom
- John Tolson, United Kingdom
- John Whitehurst, United Kingdom
- Joost Bürgi, Switzerland
- Joseph Knibb, United Kingdom
- Konstantin Chaykin, Russia
- Lazar the Hilandarian, late 14th- and early 15th-century Serbia and Russia
- Martin Burgess, United Kingdom
- Michelangelo Sapiano, Malta
- Mikulas of Kadan
- Peter Henlein, Germany
- Peter Hill (1767-1820), African-American clockmaker.
- Pierre Le Roy, France
- Rasmus Sørnes, Norway
- Richard Donisthorp, United Kingdom
- Richard of Wallingford, United Kingdom
- Salomon Coster, Netherlands
- Sigmund Riefler, Germany
- Simon Willard, United States
- Smith of Derby Group, United Kingdom
- Su Song, China
- Thomas Tompion, United Kingdom
- Thwaites & Reed, United Kingdom
- Tim Hunkin (made the London Zoo Clock and the Southwold Water Clock) United Kingdom
- Timothy Mason, United Kingdom
- William Potts & Sons, United Kingdom

== Clockmaking organizations ==
- AWCI
- British Horological Institute
- Federation of the Swiss Watch Industry FH
- Petrodvorets watch factory
- Worshipful Company of Clockmakers

== See also ==
- Chronometer watch
- Clockkeeper
- Horology
- List of clock manufacturers
- Marine chronometer
- National Association of Watch and Clock Collectors
- Timepiece
- Watchmaker

== Sources ==
- Davies, Norman (1996). Europe: A History. Oxford: Oxford University Press. ISBN 978-01982-0-171-7.
- Shull, Thelma (1963). Victorian Antiques. Rutland, Vermont: C. E. Tuttle Co. OCLC 1079787454.
