= List of United States clock companies =

The following is a list of American companies that produced, or currently produce clocks. Where known, the location of the company and the dates of clock manufacture follow the name.

- Samuel Abbott; Montpelier, Vermont (1830–1861)
- Ansonia Clock Company; Ansonia, Connecticut, and Brooklyn, New York (1851–1929)
- Attleboro Clock Company; Attleboro, Massachusetts (1890–1915)
- Bailey Banks & Biddle; Philadelphia, Pennsylvania (1832–1846)
- Birge, Gilbert & Co; Bristol, Connecticut (1835)
- Birge, Mallory & Co; Bristol, Connecticut (1837–1843)
- Birge, Peck & Co; Bristol, Connecticut (1830)
- Boardman & Dunbar; Bristol, Connecticut (1811)
- Boardman & Wells; Bristol, Connecticut (1832–1843)
- Brewster & Ingrahams; Bristol, Connecticut (1843–1852)
- Bridgeport Clock Company (? - 1853)
- Chauncey Boardman; Bristol, Connecticut (1813–1823)
- Chauncey Jerome; Bristol, Connecticut (1816–1853)
- Chelsea Clock Company; Boston, Massachusetts (1887–Present)
- Chicago Clock Manufacturing Company; Chicago, Illinois (ca. 1860–?)
- Colonial of Zeeland Clock Company; Zeeland, Michigan (1899–1986)
- David Wood; Newburyport, Massachusetts (1766–1824)
- Dyer, Wadsworth & Company; Augusta, Georgia (1838–1843)
- E. Howard & Co.; Boston, Massachusetts (1842–Present)
- E & A Ingrahams; Bristol, Connecticut (1852–1856)
- Elgin Watch Company; Illinois (1864-1968)
- Elias Ingraham; Bristol, Connecticut (1831–1841)
- Elias Ingraham & Company; Bristol, Connecticut (1857–1860)
- E Ingraham Company; Bristol, Connecticut (1884–1958)
- Eli Terry; Northbury, Connecticut (1795–1852)
- E N Welch Company; Bristol, Connecticut (1864–1903)
- F Kroeber; New York, New York (1870–1887)
- F Kroeber Clock Company; New York, New York (1887–1904)
- Franklin Clock Company; Philadelphia, Pa (1931-1962)
- General Electric
- General Time; Stamford, Connecticut (1930–2001)
- H.C. Thompson Clock Company; Bristol, Connecticut (1903-?)
- Harris & Mallow, Lakewood, NJ
- Heman Clark; Plymouth Hollow, Connecticut (1783–1813)
- Heman Clark; Salem Bridge, Connecticut (1738–1838)
- Herschede Clock Company; Cincinnati, Ohio and Starkville, Mississippi (1885-1984)
- Hotchkiss and Benedict; Auburn, New York (ca. 1835)
- Howard Miller Clock Company; Zeeland, Michigan (1926–Present)
- Ingraham Company; Bristol, Connecticut (1958–1967)
- Ithaca Calendar Clock Company; Ithaca, New York (late 1800s)
- Jennings Brothers Manufacturing Corporation Bridgeport, Connecticut (? - ?)
- Joyce Bros. & Co.; Boston, Massachusetts, Providence, Rhode Island, and Portland, Maine (? - ?)
- Lawson Clock Company, Los Angeles, California
- Luman Watson; Cincinnati, Ohio (1809–1834)
- Masterclock Inc.; St. Charles, MO (1994–Present)
- Munger and Benedict; Auburn, New York (ca. 1825)
- National Time & Signal; Wixom, Michigan (1877–present) Introduces the world's first pneumatically controlled master clock system.
- New England Clock Company; New Haven, Connecticut (1959–2000)
- New Haven Clock Company; New Haven, Connecticut (1853–1959)
- Parker & Whipple; Meriden, Connecticut (1795–1868)
- Parker & Whipple Manufacturing Company; Meriden, Connecticut (1868–1893)
- Parker Clock Company; Meriden, Connecticut (1893–1934)
- Pomeroy, Noah; Bristol, Connecticut (1847-1878)
- Ray and Ingraham; Bristol, Connecticut (1841–1844)
- Reeves & Company; (1820 - ?)
- Rempe Manufacturing Company; Danville Pennsylvania (1903--1905)
- Ridgeway Clocks; Ridgeway, Virginia
- Riley Whiting; Winchester, Connecticut and Winstead, Connecticut (1808–1835)
- Samuel Whiting; Concord, Massachusetts (1808–1817)
- Salem Clock Company; Hartford, Connecticut
- Sangamo Electric Company; Springfield, Illinois (1899–1931)
- Self Winding Clock Company; New York City, New York (1886-1970)
- Sempire Clock Company; St.Louis, Missouri (1897-1908)
- Seth Thomas Clock Company (1807–Present)
- Sessions Clock Company; Bristol, Connecticut (1903–1969)
- Spartus Corporation; Chicago, Illinois, and Louisville, Mississippi (1934–2001)
- Standard Electric Time Company; Waterbury, Connecticut, Springfield, Massachusetts, and Tecumseh, Michigan (1887–Present)
- Sternreiter; Berea, Ohio, (2003-Present)
- Telechron; Ashland, Massachusetts (1916-1992)
- Time Telegraph Company (1883–1887)
- United Clock Company; Peru, Illinois (1853–1887)
- Waltham Aircraft Clock Corporation; since 1994 in Ozark, Alabama, continuation of Waltham Precision Instruments Company
- Warren Clock Company, Ashland, Massachusetts; 1912-1946
- Waterbury Clock Company; Waterbury, Connecticut (1857–1967)
- Western Clock Company or Westclox; (1885–2001)
- William L Gilbert; Winsted, Connecticut (1841–1871)
- William L Gilbert Clock Company; Winsted, Connecticut (1871–1934)
- William L. Gilbert Clock Corporation; Winstead, Connecticut (1934–1964)
- Williams, David (clockmaker); Newport, Rhode Island and Providence, Rhode Island (c.1800-1823)
- Williams, Orton & Preston; Farmington, Connecticut (1830–1840)
- Wood Art for Living; Severn, Maryland (2009–Present)
  - Wuersch; Fall River, Massachusetts (1961-1995)
  - Elderhorst Bells, Inc., Palm, Pa. (1964–Present)

== See also ==
- List of clock manufacturers
