= Grandfather clock =

Tall, freestanding, weight-driven pendulum clock

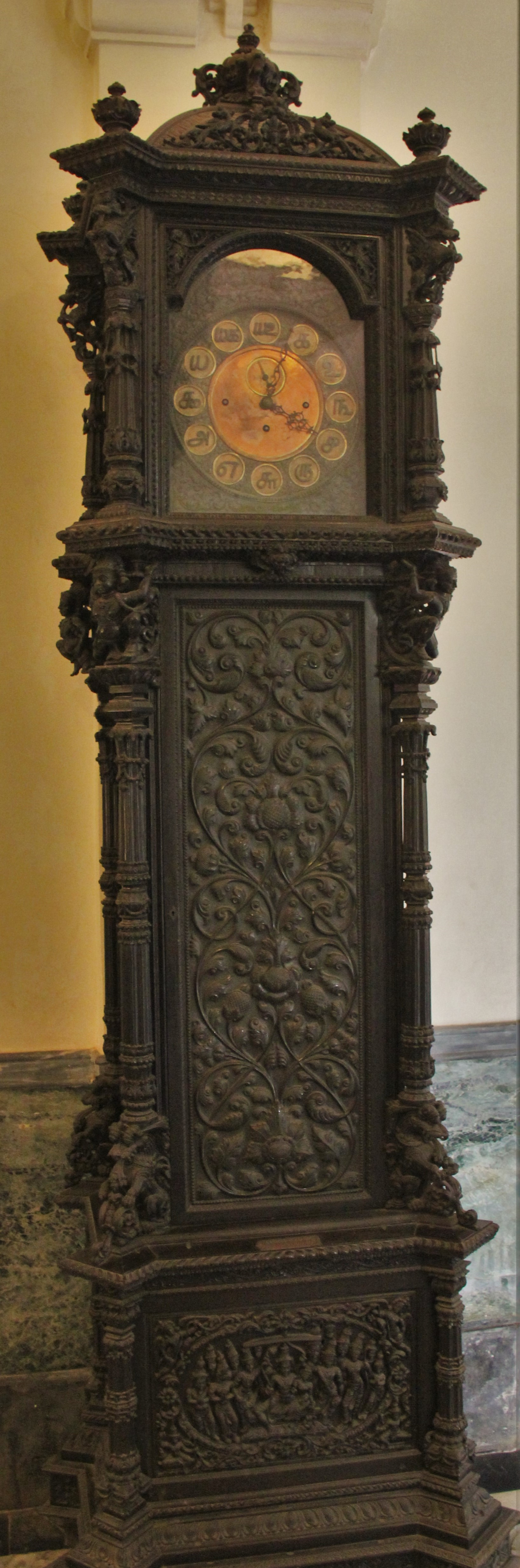
8-day longcase clock. This example dates back to 1700 and the case to late 19th – early 20th century. The original dial of this clock was replaced by a brass dial with Tamil numerals, perhaps around the same time as the case. The original long-case was also replaced by a mandapa-shaped wooden carved case done in South Indian style. The front and the side panels are done in metal repoussé work with floral meanders. The lower part of the case depicts mythological scenes and the case was manufactured at the Madras School of Arts. This clock is on display in The Prince of Wales Museum in Mumbai and was donated by Dorab Tata.

A grandfather clock (also a longcase clock, tall-case clock, grandfather's clock, hall clock or floor clock) is a tall, freestanding, weight-driven pendulum clock, with the pendulum held inside the tower or waist of the case. Clocks of this style are commonly 1.8–2.4 meters (5.9–7.9 ft) tall with an enclosed pendulum and weights, suspended by either cables or chains, that have to be occasionally calibrated to keep the proper time. The case often features elaborately carved ornamentation on the hood (or bonnet), which surrounds and frames the dial, or clock face.

The English clockmaker William Clement is credited with developing the form in 1670. Pendulum clocks were the world's most accurate timekeeping technology until the early 20th century. Furthermore, longcase clocks, due to their superior accuracy, served as time standards for households and businesses. Today, they are kept mainly for their decorative and antique value, having been superseded by analog and digital timekeepers.

== Naming ==
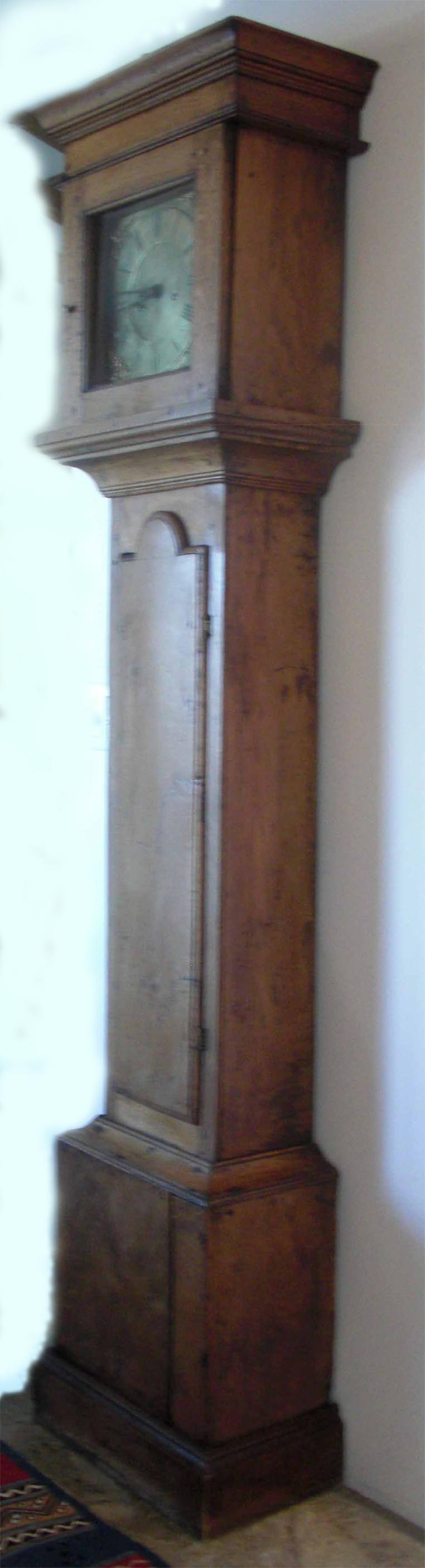
Longcase clock circa 1730 by Timothy Mason (clockmaker) of Gainsborough, Lincolnshire

The Oxford English Dictionary states that the popular 1876 song "My Grandfather's Clock" is responsible for the common name "grandfather clock" being applied to the longcase clock.

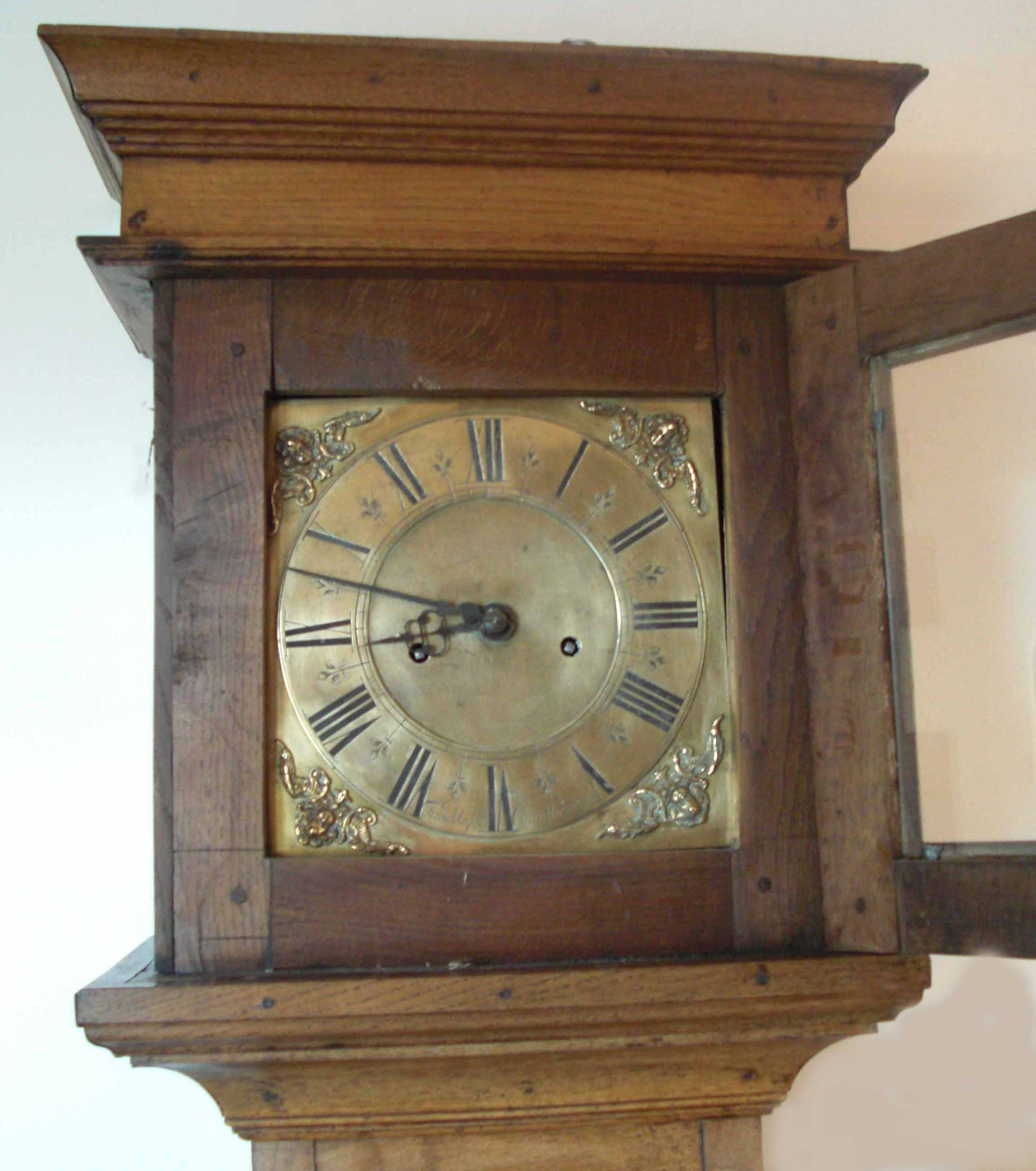
Clock face circa 1730 Timothy Mason (clockmaker) of Gainsborough

The song was composed by the American songwriter Henry Clay Work, who discovered a longcase clock in The George Hotel in Piercebridge, County Durham, England. When he asked about the clock, he was informed that it had two owners. After the first owner died, the clock became inaccurate, and when the second owner died, the clock stopped working altogether. The story inspired Henry to create the song.

Grandfather clocks are of a certain height, generally at least 1.9 metres (6 ft 3 in). There are also so-called "grandmother" and "granddaughter" clocks, which are slightly shorter.

== Origin ==
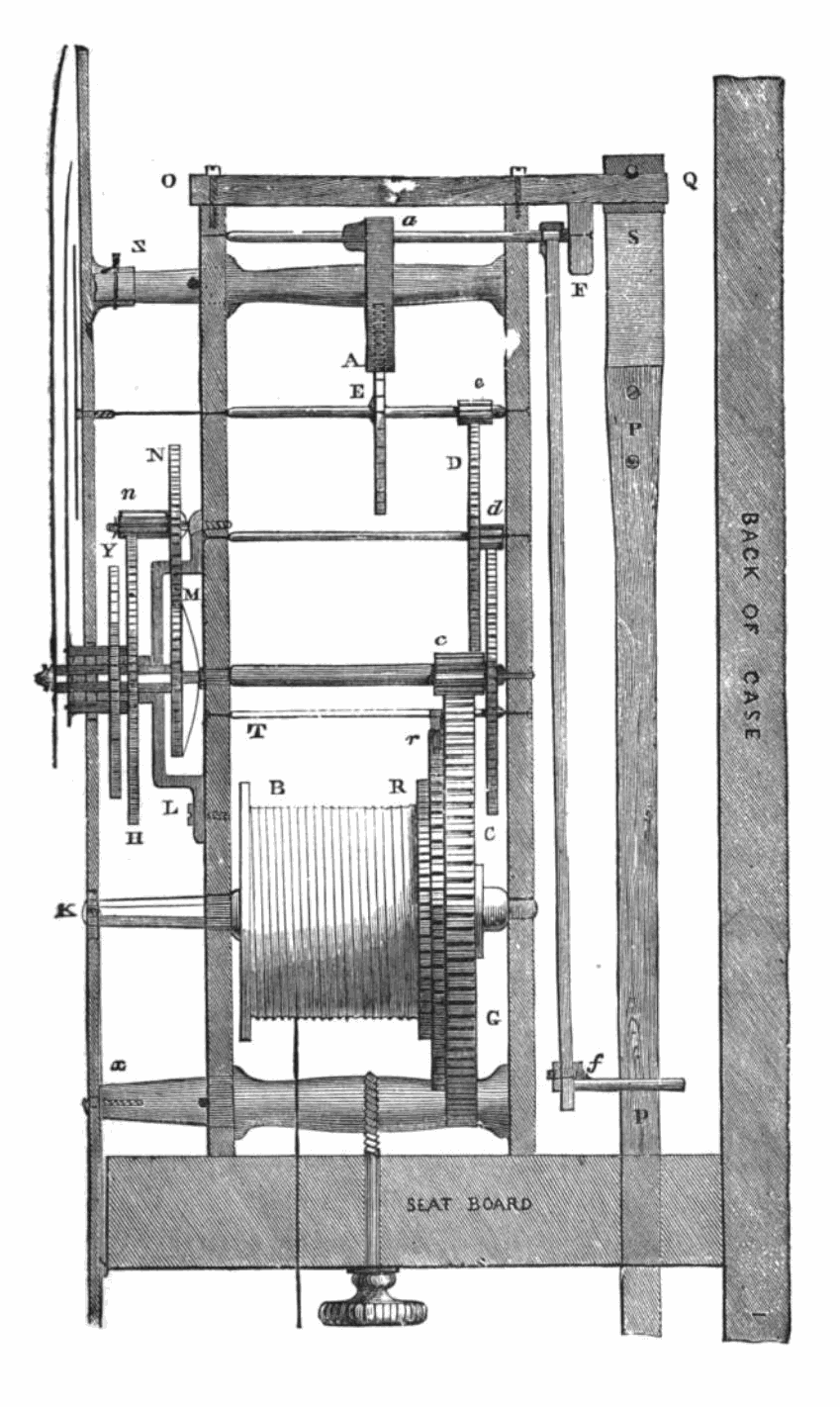
Lateral view of a longcase clock movement without striking mechanism, mid-1800s

The advent of the longcase clock was due to the invention of the anchor escapement mechanism by Robert Hooke in about 1658. Before adopting the anchor mechanism, pendulum clock movements used an older verge escapement mechanism, which required very wide pendulum swings of about 80–100 degrees. Long pendulums with such wide swings could not be fitted within a case, so most free-standing clocks had short pendulums.

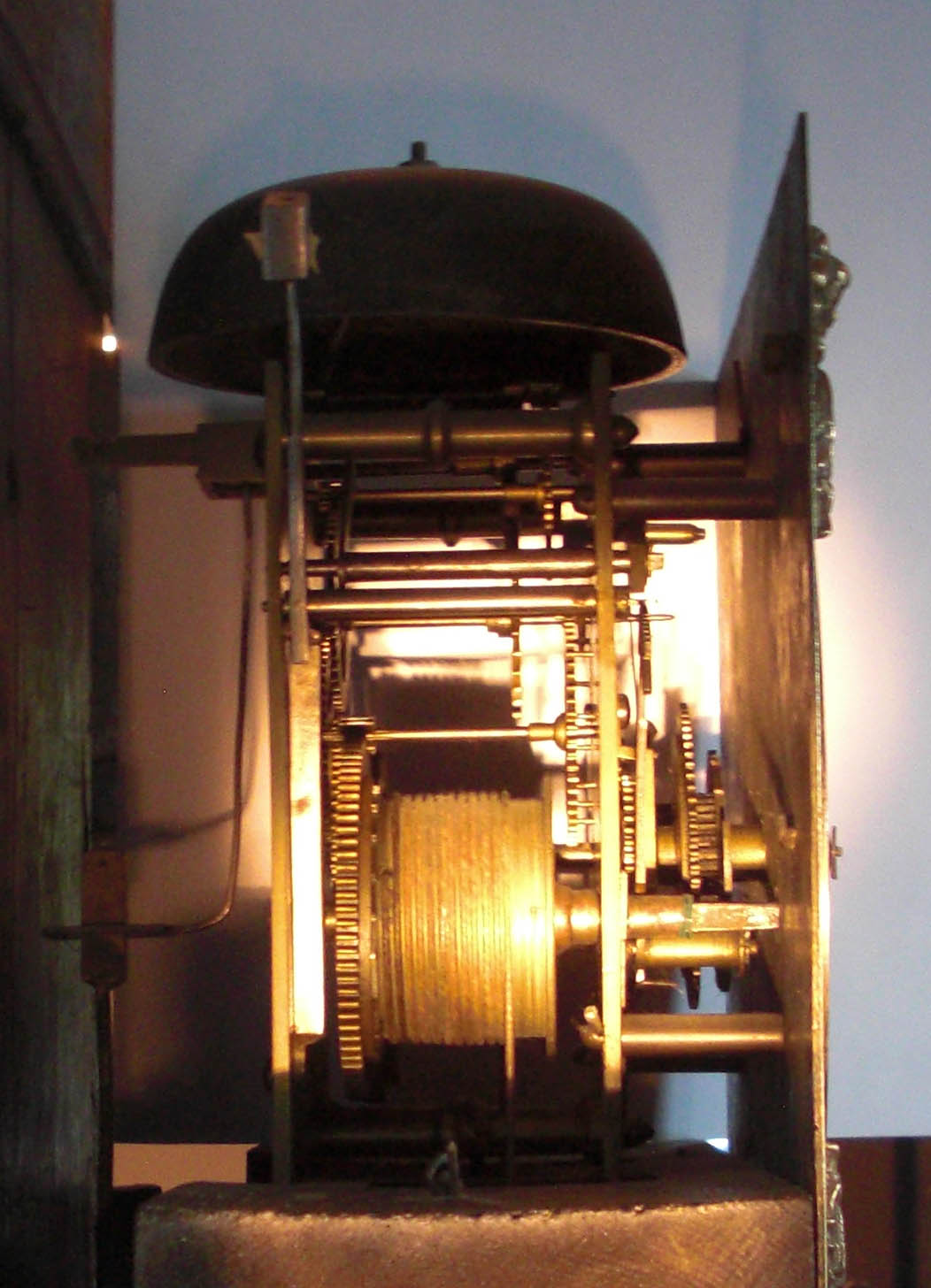
Lateral view of a Timothy Mason longcase clock movement with striking mechanism, circa 1730

The "tick-tock" of a grandfather clock

The anchor mechanism reduced the pendulum's swing to around 4 to 6 degrees, allowing clockmakers to use longer pendulums, which had slower "beats". They consumed less power, allowing clocks to run longer between windings, caused less friction and wear in the movement, and were more accurate. Almost all longcase clocks use a seconds pendulum (also called a "Royal" pendulum) meaning each swing (or half-period) takes one second. They are about 1 metre (3 ft 3 in) long (to the centre of the bob), requiring a long, narrow case. The case pre-dated the anchor clock by a few decades, appearing in clocks in 1660, to allow a long drop for the powering weights. However, once the seconds pendulum began to be used, the long case proved perfect for housing it as well.

British clockmaker William Clement, who disputed credit for the anchor escapement with Robert Hooke, had made the first longcase clocks by 1680. Later the same year, Thomas Tompion, the most prominent British clockmaker, was making them too. Longcase clocks spread rapidly from England to other European countries and Asia.

The first longcase clocks, like all clocks prior to the anchor escapement, had only one hand; an hour hand. The increased accuracy made possible by the anchor motivated the addition of the minute hand to clock faces in the next few decades.

Between 1680 and 1800, the average price of a grandfather clock in England remained steady at £1 10s. In 1680, that was the amount paid by an average working family for a year's rent, so the purchase of clocks was confined to the wealthy. By 1800, wages had increased enough to let many lower middle-class households own grandfather clocks.

Modern longcase clocks use a more accurate variation of the anchor escapement called the deadbeat escapement.

== Description ==
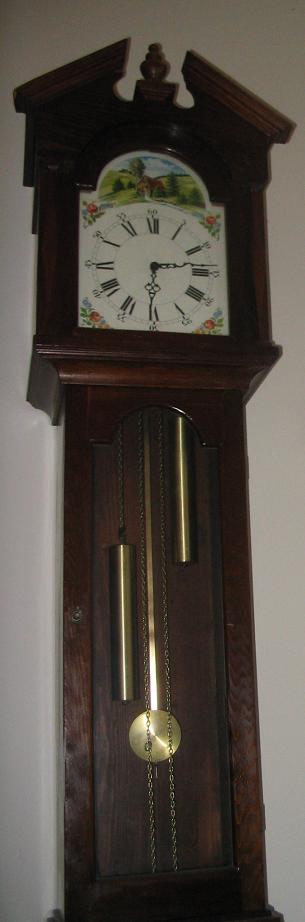
Most of a longcase clock's height is used to hold the long pendulum and weights. The two chains attached to the weights and the lack of winding holes in the dial show this to be a 30-hour clock.

Longcase clocks were traditionally made with two types of movement: eight-day and one-day (30-hour) movements. A clock with an eight-day movement required winding only once a week, while generally less-expensive 30-hour clocks had to be wound daily. Eight-day clocks are often driven by two weights – one driving the pendulum and the other the striking mechanism, which typically consisted of a bell or chimes. Such movements usually have two keyholes, one on every side of the dial, to wind each weight.

By contrast, 30-hour clocks often had a single weight to drive the timekeeping and striking mechanisms. Some 30-hour clocks were made with false keyholes for customers who wanted guests to think that the household was able to afford the more expensive eight-day clock. All modern striking longcase clocks have eight-day mechanical quarter chiming and full hour striking movements. Most longcase clocks are cable-driven, meaning that cables suspend the weights. If the cable was attached directly to the weight, the load would cause rotation and untwist the cable strands, so the cable wraps around a pulley mounted to the top of each weight. The mechanical advantage of that arrangement also doubles the running time allowed by a given weight drop.

Cable clocks are wound by inserting a special crank (called a "key") into holes in the clock's face and turning it. Others are chain-driven, meaning that the weights are suspended by chains which wrap around gears in the clock's mechanism, with the opposite end of the chain hanging down next to the weight. To wind a chain-driven longcase clock, one pulls on the end of each chain, lifting the weights until they are just under the clock's face.

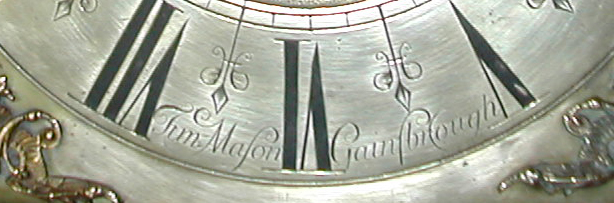
Clock-face signature of Tim Mason

The world's tallest grandfather clock is 35 feet 10 inches (10.92 m) tall and is fully operational, with chimes on each quarter hour. It was made by Svoboda Industries in 1976 as a Bicentennial project and is located in Kewaunee, Wisconsin.

== Elaborate striking sequences ==
In the early 20th century, quarter-hour chime sequences were added to longcase clocks. A full chime sequence sounds at the top of each hour, immediately followed by the hour strike. At 15 minutes after each hour, 1/4 of the chime sequence plays. Proceeding that, at the bottom of each hour, 1/2 of the chime sequence plays. Then finally, at 15 minutes before each hour, 3/4 of the chime sequence plays. The chime tune used in almost all longcase clocks is Westminster Quarters. Many also offer the option of Whittington chimes or St. Michael's chimes, selectable by a switch mounted on the right side of the dial, allowing one to silence the chimes if desired. As a result of adding chime sequences, all modern mechanical longcase clocks have three weights instead of two. The left weight provides power for the hour strike, the middle-weight provides power for the clock's pendulum and general timekeeping functions, and the right weight provides power for the quarter-hour chime sequences.

== Types ==
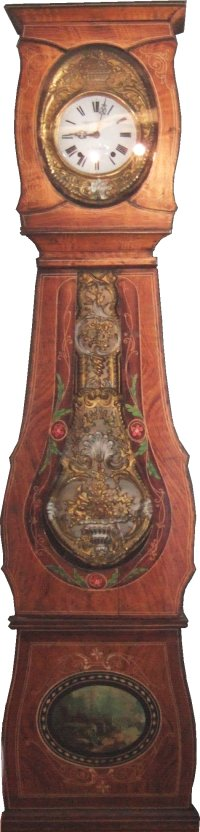
Comtoise clock

=== Comtoise ===
Comtoise clocks, also called Morbier clocks or Morez clocks, are a style of longcase clock made in the French region Franche-Comté (hence their name). Features distinguishing this style are a curving "potbellied" case and a greater use of curved lines. A heavy, elongated, ornamented pendulum bob often extends up the case (see photo).

Production of these clocks began in 1680 and continued for about 230 years. During the peak production years (1850–1890), over 60,000 clocks were made each year. These clocks were very fashionable across generations; they kept the time on farms throughout France. Many Comtoise clocks can be found in France, but they are also frequently found in Spain, Germany, and other parts of Europe, less in the United States. Many Comtoise clocks were also exported to other countries in Europe and even further, to the Ottoman Empire and as far as Thailand. A wooden sheath usually protected the metal mechanisms during transport.

=== Bornholm and Mora ===
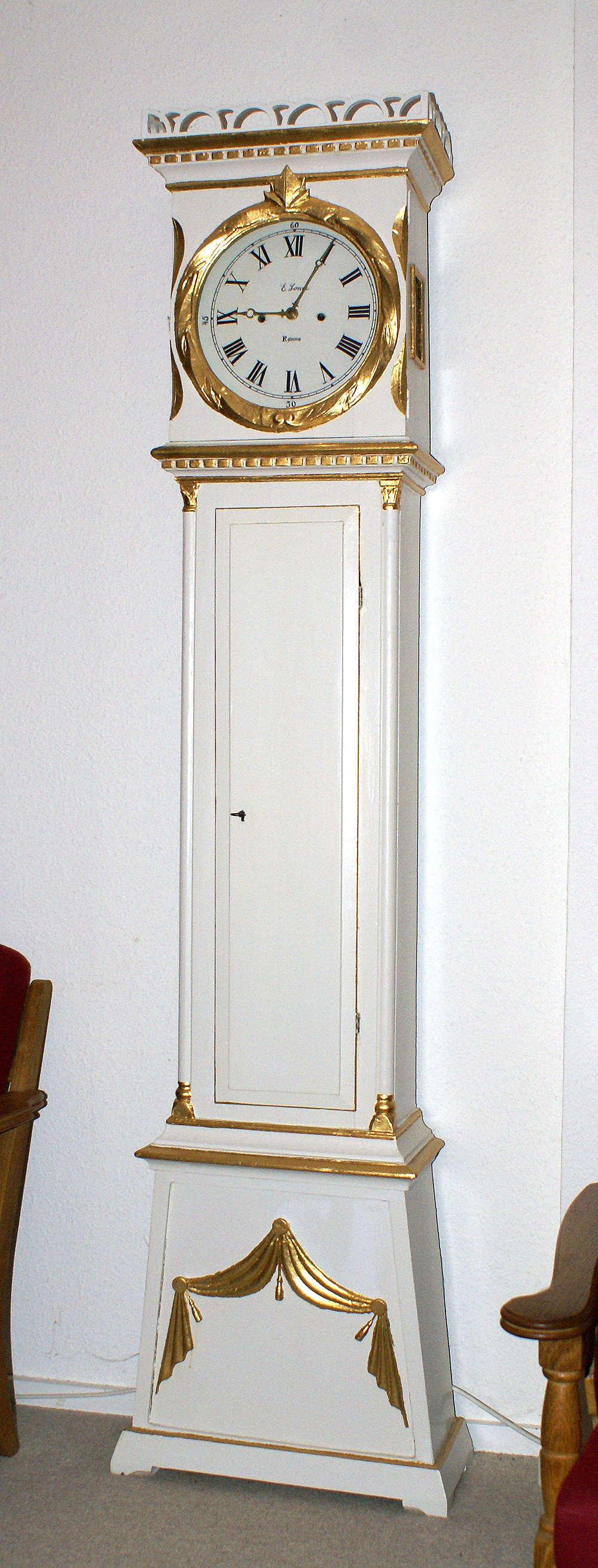
Bornholm clock made by Edvart Sonne, from Rønne, Bornholm in the late 1700s

Bornholm clocks are Danish longcase clocks and were made on Bornholm from 1745 to 1900. In Sweden, a special type of longcase clocks was made in Mora, called Mora clocks.

Bornholm clock-making began in the 1740s when an English ship, which had longcase clocks in its hold, was stranded. They were sent for repair to a turner named Poul Ottesen Arboe in Rønne. As a result of his repair of them, he learned enough about clocks to begin making his own.

== Historical manufacturers ==
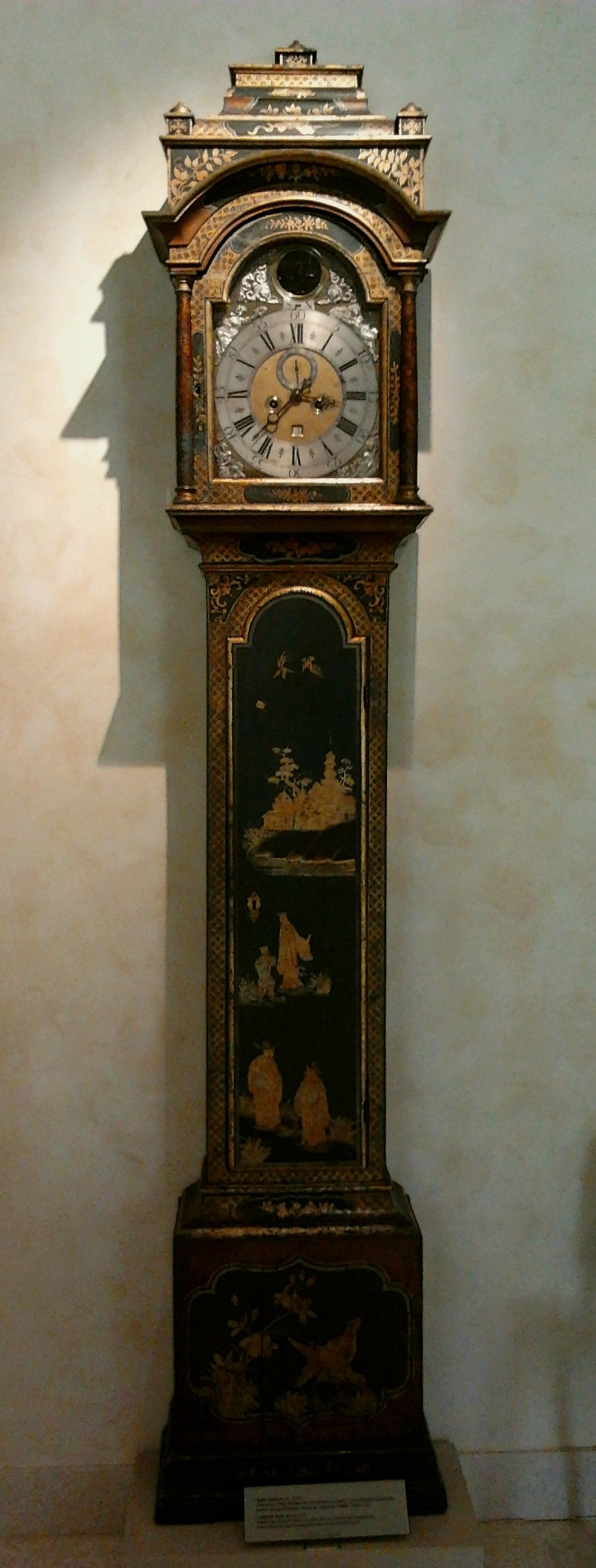
Longcase clock from about 1750 in the District Museum in Tarnów in Poland, mounted with use of imported components marked Wiliam Jourdain London and adorned with chinoiserie motifs

British

- John Alker or Alker of Wigan, Lancashire
- Allam & Clements
- Samuel Ashton, Ashbourne
- William Barrow, London
- Bilbie family, Somerset
- Thomas Birchall Nantwich, Cheshire
- Peter Bower, Redlynch, Wiltshire
- Joseph Bowles, Winbourne (i.e.: Wimbourne), Dorset; active 1791
- Samuel Bowles, Wimbourne, Dorset
- Robert Bryson, Edinburgh
- William Bucknall, Burslem (Stoke-on-Trent)
- Thomas Bullock, Bath, Somerset
- Samuel Buxton, Diss, Norfolk
- John Calver, Woodbridge, Suffolk
- Thomas Cartwright
- John Clement & Son (Tring, Hertfordshire)
- Thomas Dobbie, Gorbals, Glasgow
- Richard Donisthorp (fl. 1797), of Loughborough
- Matthew & Thomas Dutton
- Peter Fearnley, Wigan
- John Fernhill, Wrexham
- Thomas Hackney, London, c. 1700–1750
- Edward Harrison, Warrington
- John Harrison, Wakefield/Barrow upon Humber/London
- Enoch Hawksey (d. 1799) of Nantwich, Cheshire, active c. 1779 – 1799
- Nathaniel Hedge, Colchester, Essex
- Holmes
- Edward Houlgrave (1739–1789), b. Liverpool, active in London c. 1780s
- Ellis Houlgrave (1759–1793), son of Edward Houlgrave, b. Liverpool, active in London c. 1778 – 1789
- James Howden, Edinburgh
- Thomas Husband, Hull
- Thomas Johnson
- John Knibb, Oxford and London
- Joseph Knibb, Oxford and London
- William Lassell (1758–1790), Toxteth Park, Liverpool
- Timothy Mason, Gainsborough, Lincolnshire
- Alexander Miller, Montrose
- Peddie, Stirling, Scotland
- Daniel Quare
- Thomas Ross, Hull
- John Snelling, Alton
- John Trubshaw, London
- Warry, Bristol
- James Woolley Codnor
- Thomas Worswick, Lancaster
- Thomas Wright
- Henry Young, Swaffham, Norfolk
- John Wyld, Nottingham
- Stephen Harris, Tonbridge
- Watkin Owen, Llanrwst

Irish

- W Egan & Sons, Cork
- James Mangan, Cork
- Ezekiel Bullock, Lurgan
- Alexander Gordon, Dublin

Finnish

- Masters of Könni Könnin mestarit (1757–1865), Ilmajoki
- Finnish Museum of Horology is master of Jaakko Könni manufactured table clocks and pocket watches
- Ilmajoki Museum is Masters of Könni manufactured horse vehicles, clocks, looms, locks, tools, machine of gear "keervärkki"

Americans

- Ansonia Clock Company (1851–2006), Ansonia, Connecticut and Brooklyn, New York
- Benjamin Bagnall (1689–1773), Boston
- Aaron Brokaw (1768–1853), Bridge Town, New Jersey
- Isaac Brokaw (1746–1826), Bridge Town, New Jersey
- Silas Merriman (1733–1805), New Haven, Connecticut
- Aaron Miller (d. 1778), Elizabeth Township, New Jersey
- Luman Watson (1790–1834), Cincinnati
- Simon Willard (1753–1848), Roxbury, Massachusetts
- Zachariah Grandfather Clocks (1975–1987), Chicago, Illinois
- Daniel White Griswold (1767–1844), Harwinton, Connecticut

Australian casemaker

- Harry Williams – Oxford Cabinet Company Pty Ltd (1946–1961), Granville, New South Wales, Australia

Pendulum swinging on a grandfather clock in Japan

== Current manufacturers ==
- Hermle Clocks – Amherst VA
- Howard Miller Clock Company – Zeeland MI
- Ridgeway Clocks (owned now by Howard Miller Clock Co.)
- Seth Thomas Clock Company – (reopened under the Colibri Group)
