= 2025 Xfinity 500 =

NASCAR Cup Series race

Race details
- Race 35 of 36 in the 2025 NASCAR Cup Series
- 2025 Xfinity 500 official program
- Date: October 26, 2025
- Location: Martinsville Speedway in Ridgeway, Virginia
- Course: Permanent racing facility
- Course length: 0.526 miles (0.847 km)
- Distance: 500 laps, 263 mi (423.5 km)
- Average speed: 73.744 miles per hour (118.679 km/h)

Pole position
Driver	William Byron	Hendrick Motorsports
- Time: 19.286

Most laps led
Driver	William Byron	Hendrick Motorsports
- Laps: 304

Fastest lap
Driver	William Byron	Hendrick Motorsports
- Time: 19.75

Winner
No. 24	William Byron	Hendrick Motorsports

Television in the United States
- Network: NBC
- Announcers: Leigh Diffey, Jeff Burton, and Steve Letarte.

Radio in the United States
- Radio: MRN
- Booth announcers: Alex Hayden, Kyle Rickey, and Todd Gordon
- Turn announcers: Dave Moody (Backstretch)

The 2025 Xfinity 500 was a NASCAR Cup Series race that was held on October 26, 2025, at Martinsville Speedway in Ridgeway, Virginia. Contested over 500 laps on the 0.526 mile (0.847 km) paperclip-shaped short track, it was the 35th race of the 2025 NASCAR Cup Series season, the ninth race of the Playoffs, and final race of the Round of 8.

William Byron won the race. Ryan Blaney finished 2nd, and Chase Elliott finished 3rd. Ross Chastain and Kyle Larson rounded out the top five, and Ryan Preece, Christopher Bell, Joey Logano, Todd Gilliland, and Josh Berry rounded out the top ten.

Following the race, Christopher Bell, Joey Logano, Chase Elliott, and Ryan Blaney were all eliminated from the playoffs.

== Report ==
=== Background ===
Martinsville Speedway, the track where the race was held.

Martinsville Speedway is a NASCAR-owned stock car racing track located in Henry County, in Ridgeway, Virginia, just to the south of Martinsville. At 0.526 miles (0.847 km) in length, it is the shortest track in the NASCAR Cup Series. The track was also one of the first paved oval tracks in NASCAR, being built in 1947 by H. Clay Earles. It is also the only remaining race track on the NASCAR circuit since its beginning in 1948.

During the weekend, the track announced following the closure of Howard Miller, which included Ridgeway Clocks, that HUM Uhrenmanufaktur GmbH & Co. KG, which has North American headquarters in Amherst, 105 miles from the track in Lynchburg, will provide the trophies for race winners.

==== Entry list ====
- (R) denotes rookie driver.
- (P) denotes playoff driver.
- (i) denotes driver who is ineligible for series driver points.

No.	Driver	Team	Manufacturer
1	Ross Chastain	Trackhouse Racing	Chevrolet
2	Austin Cindric	Team Penske	Ford
3	Austin Dillon	Richard Childress Racing	Chevrolet
4	Noah Gragson	Front Row Motorsports	Ford
5	Kyle Larson (P)	Hendrick Motorsports	Chevrolet
6	Brad Keselowski	RFK Racing	Ford
7	Justin Haley	Spire Motorsports	Chevrolet
8	Kyle Busch	Richard Childress Racing	Chevrolet
9	Chase Elliott (P)	Hendrick Motorsports	Chevrolet
10	Ty Dillon	Kaulig Racing	Chevrolet
11	Denny Hamlin (P)	Joe Gibbs Racing	Toyota
12	Ryan Blaney (P)	Team Penske	Ford
16	A. J. Allmendinger	Kaulig Racing	Chevrolet
17	Chris Buescher	RFK Racing	Ford
19	Chase Briscoe (P)	Joe Gibbs Racing	Toyota
20	Christopher Bell (P)	Joe Gibbs Racing	Toyota
21	Josh Berry	Wood Brothers Racing	Ford
22	Joey Logano (P)	Team Penske	Ford
23	Bubba Wallace	23XI Racing	Toyota
24	William Byron (P)	Hendrick Motorsports	Chevrolet
34	Todd Gilliland	Front Row Motorsports	Ford
35	Riley Herbst (R)	23XI Racing	Toyota
38	Zane Smith	Front Row Motorsports	Ford
41	Cole Custer	Haas Factory Team	Ford
42	John Hunter Nemechek	Legacy Motor Club	Toyota
43	Erik Jones	Legacy Motor Club	Toyota
45	Tyler Reddick	23XI Racing	Toyota
47	Ricky Stenhouse Jr.	Hyak Motorsports	Chevrolet
48	Alex Bowman	Hendrick Motorsports	Chevrolet
51	Cody Ware	Rick Ware Racing	Ford
54	Ty Gibbs	Joe Gibbs Racing	Toyota
60	Ryan Preece	RFK Racing	Ford
66	Casey Mears (i)	Garage 66	Chevrolet
71	Michael McDowell	Spire Motorsports	Chevrolet
77	Carson Hocevar	Spire Motorsports	Chevrolet
88	Shane van Gisbergen (R)	Trackhouse Racing	Chevrolet
99	Daniel Suárez	Trackhouse Racing	Chevrolet
Official entry list

== Practice ==
Chase Elliott was the fastest in the practice session with a time of 19.676 seconds and a speed of 95.796 mph (154.169 km/h).

=== Practice results ===
Pos	No.	Driver	Team	Manufacturer	Time	Speed
1	9	Chase Elliott (P)	Hendrick Motorsports	Chevrolet	19.767	95.796
2	11	Denny Hamlin (P)	Joe Gibbs Racing	Toyota	19.768	95.791
3	54	Ty Gibbs	Joe Gibbs Racing	Toyota	19.770	95.782
Official practice results

== Qualifying ==
William Byron scored the pole for the race with a time of 19.286 and a speed of 98.185 mph (158.013 km/h).

=== Qualifying results ===
Pos	No.	Driver	Team	Manufacturer	Time	Speed
1	24	William Byron (P)	Hendrick Motorsports	Chevrolet	19.286	98.185
2	54	Ty Gibbs	Joe Gibbs Racing	Toyota	19.288	98.175
3	5	Kyle Larson (P)	Hendrick Motorsports	Chevrolet	19.315	98.038
4	22	Joey Logano (P)	Team Penske	Ford	19.322	98.002
5	11	Denny Hamlin (P)	Joe Gibbs Racing	Toyota	19.347	97.876
6	41	Cole Custer	Haas Factory Team	Ford	19.348	97.871
7	8	Kyle Busch	Richard Childress Racing	Chevrolet	19.352	97.850
8	9	Chase Elliott (P)	Hendrick Motorsports	Chevrolet	19.353	97.845
9	19	Chase Briscoe (P)	Joe Gibbs Racing	Ford	19.376	97.729
10	2	Austin Cindric	Team Penske	Ford	19.393	97.643
11	71	Michael McDowell	Spire Motorsports	Chevrolet	19.399	97.613
12	20	Christopher Bell (P)	Joe Gibbs Racing	Toyota	19.401	97.603
13	1	Ross Chastain	Trackhouse Racing	Chevrolet	19.408	97.568
14	45	Tyler Reddick	23XI Racing	Toyota	19.411	97.553
15	77	Carson Hocevar	Spire Motorsports	Chevrolet	19.417	97.523
16	34	Todd Gilliland	Front Row Motorsports	Ford	19.433	97.442
17	48	Alex Bowman	Hendrick Motorsports	Chevrolet	19.437	97.422
18	60	Ryan Preece	RFK Racing	Ford	19.438	97.417
19	6	Brad Keselowski	RFK Racing	Ford	19.453	97.342
20	3	Austin Dillon	Richard Childress Racing	Chevrolet	19.455	97.332
21	23	Bubba Wallace	23XI Racing	Toyota	19.459	97.312
22	88	Shane Van Gisbergen (R)	Trackhouse Racing	Chevrolet	19.462	97.297
23	38	Zane Smith	Front Row Motorsports	Ford	19.505	97.083
24	42	John Hunter Nemechek	Legacy Motor Club	Toyota	19.511	97.053
25	35	Riley Herbst (R)	23XI Racing	Toyota	19.520	97.008
26	10	Ty Dillon	Kaulig Racing	Chevrolet	19.526	96.978
27	21	Josh Berry	Wood Brothers Racing	Ford	19.530	96.959
28	43	Erik Jones	Legacy Motor Club	Toyota	19.530	96.959
29	17	Chris Buescher	RFK Racing	Ford	19.559	96.815
30	99	Daniel Suárez	Trackhouse Racing	Chevrolet	19.560	96.810
31	12	Ryan Blaney (P)	Team Penske	Ford	19.606	96.583
32	47	Ricky Stenhouse Jr.	Hyak Motorsports	Chevrolet	19.629	96.470
33	16	A. J. Allmendinger	Kaulig Racing	Chevrolet	19.648	96.376
34	7	Justin Haley	Spire Motorsports	Chevrolet	19.670	96.268
35	4	Noah Gragson	Front Row Motorsports	Ford	19.704	96.102
36	51	Cody Ware	Rick Ware Racing	Ford	19.832	95.482
37	66	Casey Mears (i)	Garage 66	Ford	19.895	95.180
Official qualifying results

== Race ==
=== Race results ===
==== Stage results ====
Stage One Laps: 130

Pos	No	Driver	Team	Manufacturer	Points
1	24	William Byron (P)	Hendrick Motorsports	Chevrolet	10
2	22	Joey Logano (P)	Team Penske	Ford	9
3	5	Kyle Larson (P)	Hendrick Motorsports	Chevrolet	8
4	9	Chase Elliott (P)	Hendrick Motorsports	Chevrolet	7
5	54	Ty Gibbs	Joe Gibbs Racing	Toyota	6
6	11	Denny Hamlin (P)	Joe Gibbs Racing	Toyota	5
7	12	Ryan Blaney (P)	Team Penske	Ford	4
8	20	Christopher Bell (P)	Joe Gibbs Racing	Toyota	3
9	34	Todd Gilliland	Front Row Motorsports	Ford	2
10	2	Austin Cindric	Team Penske	Ford	1
Official stage one results

Stage Two Laps: 130

Pos	No	Driver	Team	Manufacturer	Points
1	24	William Byron (P)	Hendrick Motorpsorts	Chevrolet	10
2	5	Kyle Larson (P)	Hendrick Motorsports	Chevrolet	9
3	20	Christopher Bell (P)	Joe Gibbs Racing	Toyota	8
4	9	Chase Elliott (P)	Hendrick Motorsports	Chevrolet	7
5	34	Todd Gilliland	Front Row Motorsports	Ford	6
6	19	Chase Briscoe (P)	Joe Gibbs Racing	Toyota	5
7	60	Ryan Preece	RFK Racing	Ford	4
8	88	Shane van Gisbergen (R)	Trackhouse Racing	Chevrolet	3
9	45	Tyler Reddick	23XI Racing	Toyota	2
10	43	Erik Jones	Legacy Motor Club	Toyota	1
Official stage two results

=== Final Stage results ===
Stage Three Laps: 240

Pos	Grid	No	Driver	Team	Manufacturer	Laps	Points
1	1	24	William Byron (P)	Hendrick Motorsports	Chevrolet	500	61
2	31	12	Ryan Blaney (P)	Team Penske	Ford	500	39
3	8	9	Chase Elliott (P)	Hendrick Motorsports	Chevrolet	500	48
4	13	1	Ross Chastain	Trackhouse Racing	Chevrolet	500	33
5	3	5	Kyle Larson (P)	Hendrick Motorsports	Chevrolet	500	49
6	18	60	Ryan Preece	RFK Racing	Ford	500	35
7	12	20	Christopher Bell (P)	Joe Gibbs Racing	Toyota	500	41
8	4	22	Joey Logano (P)	Team Penske	Ford	500	38
9	16	34	Todd Gilliland	Front Row Motorsports	Ford	500	36
10	27	21	Josh Berry	Wood Brothers Racing	Ford	500	27
11	14	45	Tyler Reddick	23XI Racing	Toyota	500	28
12	2	54	Ty Gibbs	Joe Gibbs Racing	Toyota	500	31
13	7	8	Kyle Busch	Richard Childress Racing	Chevrolet	500	24
14	22	88	Shane van Gisbergen (R)	Trackhouse Racing	Chevrolet	500	26
15	10	2	Austin Cindric	Team Penske	Ford	500	23
16	20	3	Austin Dillon	Richard Childress Racing	Chevrolet	500	21
17	6	41	Cole Custer	Haas Factory Team	Ford	500	20
18	21	23	Bubba Wallace	23XI Racing	Toyota	500	19
19	34	7	Justin Haley	Spire Motorsports	Chevrolet	499	18
20	19	6	Brad Keselowski	RFK Racing	Ford	499	17
21	24	42	John Hunter Nemechek	Legacy Motor Club	Toyota	499	16
22	30	99	Daniel Suárez	Trackhouse Racing	Chevrolet	499	15
23	17	48	Alex Bowman	Hendrick Motorsports	Chevrolet	499	14
24	11	71	Michael McDowell	Spire Motorsports	Chevrolet	499	13
25	23	38	Zane Smith	Front Row Motorsports	Ford	498	12
26	26	10	Ty Dillon	Kaulig Racing	Chevrolet	498	11
27	32	47	Ricky Stenhouse Jr.	Hyak Motorsports	Chevrolet	498	10
28	33	16	A. J. Allmendinger	Kaulig Racing	Chevrolet	497	9
29	29	17	Chris Buescher	RFK Racing	Ford	497	8
30	35	4	Noah Gragson	Front Row Motorsports	Ford	497	7
31	15	77	Carson Hocevar	Spire Motorsports	Chevrolet	497	6
32	36	51	Cody Ware	Rick Ware Racing	Ford	488	5
33	37	66	Casey Mears (i)	Garage 66	Ford	478	0
34	28	43	Erik Jones	Legacy Motor Club	Toyota	406	4
35	5	11	Denny Hamlin (P)	Joe Gibbs Racing	Toyota	334	7
36	25	35	Riley Herbst (R)	23XI Racing	Toyota	323	1
37	9	19	Chase Briscoe (P)	Joe Gibbs Racing	Toyota	295	6
Official race results

=== Race statistics ===
- Lead changes: 7 among 5 different drivers
- Cautions/Laps: 10 for 78
- Red flags: 0
- Time of race: 3 hours, 33 minutes, and 59 seconds
- Average speed: 73.744 miles per hour (118.679 km/h)

== Media ==
=== Television ===
NBC covered the race on the television side. Leigh Diffey, 1997 race winner Jeff Burton, and Steve Letarte called the race from the broadcast booth. Dave Burns, Kim Coon, Parker Kligerman and Marty Snider handled the pit road duties from pit lane.

NBC
Booth announcers	Pit reporters
Lap-by-lap: Leigh Diffey; Color-commentator: Jeff Burton; Color-commentator: Steve Letarte	Dave Burns; Kim Coon; Parker Kligerman; Marty Snider

=== Radio ===
MRN had the radio call for the race, which was also simulcast on Sirius XM NASCAR Radio. Alex Hayden, Kyle Rickey and Todd Gordon had the call for MRN when the field raced down the front straightaway. Dave Moody covered the action for MRN when the field raced down the backstraightway into turn 3. MRN Lead Pit Reporter Steve Post, PRN Radio's Wendy Venturini, and Chris Wilner covered the action for MRN from pit lane.

MRN
Booth announcers	Turn announcers	Pit reporters
Lead announcer: Alex Hayden; Announcer: Kyle Rickey; Announcer: Todd Gordon	Backstretch: Dave Moody	Steve Post; Wendy Venturini; Chris Wilner

== Standings after the race ==
Drivers' Championship standings

	Pos	Driver	Points
	1	Chase Briscoe	5,000
2	2	Denny Hamlin	5,000 (–0)
2	3	William Byron	5,000 (–0)
1	4	Kyle Larson	5,000 (–0)
3	5	Christopher Bell	2,371 (–2,629)
1	6	Ryan Blaney	2,315 (–2,685)
2	7	Tyler Reddick	2,298 (–2,702)
2	8	Joey Logano	2,291 (–2,709)
1	9	Chase Elliott	2,282 (–2,718)
	10	Bubba Wallace	2,255 (–2,245)
	11	Ross Chastain	2,243 (–2,757)
	12	Shane van Gisbergen	2,198 (–2,802)
	13	Alex Bowman	2,166 (–2,834)
	14	Austin Cindric	2,146 (–2,854)
	15	Austin Dillon	2,135 (–2,865)
	16	Josh Berry	2,120 (–2,880)
Official driver's standings

Manufacturers' Championship standings

Pos	Manufacturer	Points
1	Chevrolet	1,276
2	Toyota	1,250 (–26)
3	Ford	1,170 (–106)

- Note: Only the first 16 positions are included for the driver standings.

Previous race: 2025 YellaWood 500	NASCAR Cup Series; 2025 season	Next race: 2025 NASCAR Cup Series Championship Race
