= Calver (disambiguation) =

Calver is a village in Derbyshire, England.

Calver may also refer to:

- Calver (surname)
- Calver Hill, a fell in the Yorkshire Dales National Park in North Yorkshire, England
- Calver Island, an archaeological site in Swatara Township, Dauphin County, Pennsylvania
- CalVer, a type of date-based versioning for software.
