= Taidepoliisi =

Coordinates: 60°10.73′N 24°47.92′E

Taidepoliisi (Finnish for "arts police") (Swedish: Konstpolisen) is a statue designed by Pekka Kauhanen, located in Espoo, Finland, in the roundabout between Pohjantie and Ahertajantie. The statue directs the public to the Espoo Museum of Modern Art (Emma), located in the WeeGee house.

The statue was revealed 4 October 2006, shortly before Emma's opening. It is cast from bronze and stands on a pedestal made of stainless steel. With the pedestal, the height of the statue is about five metres. It is part of the arts collection of the city of Espoo.

The policeman in the statue has three arms, but only ten fingers in total. According to Kauhanen, "the rhythmic of Taidepoliisi's arms just requires three arms".
