= Clock chime =

Melody played to mark the passage of time

A clock chime is a melody or a set of melodies played at intervals upon a set of bells to mark the passage of time. It is also the name of the installed set of bells, when they are not part of a larger bell instrument such as a carillon. Bells that play clock chimes are commonly placed in bell towers and elaborate floor clocks, but may be found any place where a large clock is installed.

The chime is distinct from the striking of the hour on a single bell, although a clock that plays a chime normally plays the associated hour strike as well, while the bell stuck on the hour may or may not have a part in the melodies. A variety of chime melodies exist, many associated with a particular location or bell tower that originated or popularized them.

== History ==
The practice of using bells to mark time dates at least to the time of the early Christian church, which used bells to mark the "canonical hours". An 8th-century Archbishop of York gave his priests instructions to sound church bells at certain times, and by the 10th century Saint Dunstan had written an extensive guide to bell-ringing to mark the canonical hours. Henry Beauchamp Walters' Church Bells of England features an entire chapter devoted to the regional variation in what bells were rung, how often, and what events they signaled throughout medieval England.

It is from these practices that clock chimes seem to have eventually emerged. Clock towers that chimed on the hour appeared in Italy by the 13th century. They were common enough by the 15th century that, in 1463, Englishman John Baret willed funds to the sexton of St. Mary's Church so that he would "keep the clock, take heed to the chimes, [and] wind up the pegs and the plummets as often as need".

== Quarter bells ==
Quarter bells are the bells that the clock mechanism strikes on each passing quarter of the hour. Often, as in the case of Big Ben, a different tune is played for each quarter. This enables people to be able to tell the time, without actually having to be within sight of the clock face.

== See also ==
- Ave Maria chimes
- St. Michaels chimes
- Westminster quarters
- Whittington chimes
