= Calver (surname) =

Calver is a surname. Notable people with the surname include:

- Aaron Calver (born 1996), Australian soccer player
- Bronwyn Calver (born 1969), Australian cricketer
- Clive Calver (born 1949), British-born American Evangelical Christian leader
- Craig Calver (born 1991), English football player
- Edward Calver (fl. 1649), English poet
- Edward Killwick Calver (1813–1892), Royal Navy officer and hydrographic surveyor
- Homer Calver (1892–1970), American health educator
- John Calver (c. 1695–1751), English clockmaker
- Stu Calver (died 2000), British singer
