= Sessions Clock =

Former American clock manufacturer

The Sessions Clock Company ("Sessions") was one of several notable American clock companies centered in Connecticut. Sessions and its predecessor (E.N. Welch Company), along with the E. Ingraham Company, the Ansonia Clock Company, the New Haven Clock Company, the Seth Thomas Clock Company, the William L. Gilbert Clock Company, and the Waterbury Clock Company collectively produced most of the mechanical clocks made in America between the mid-19th century and 1950. In 1942, Sessions ended its production of wind up mechanical clocks and produced electrical clocks exclusively.

== History ==
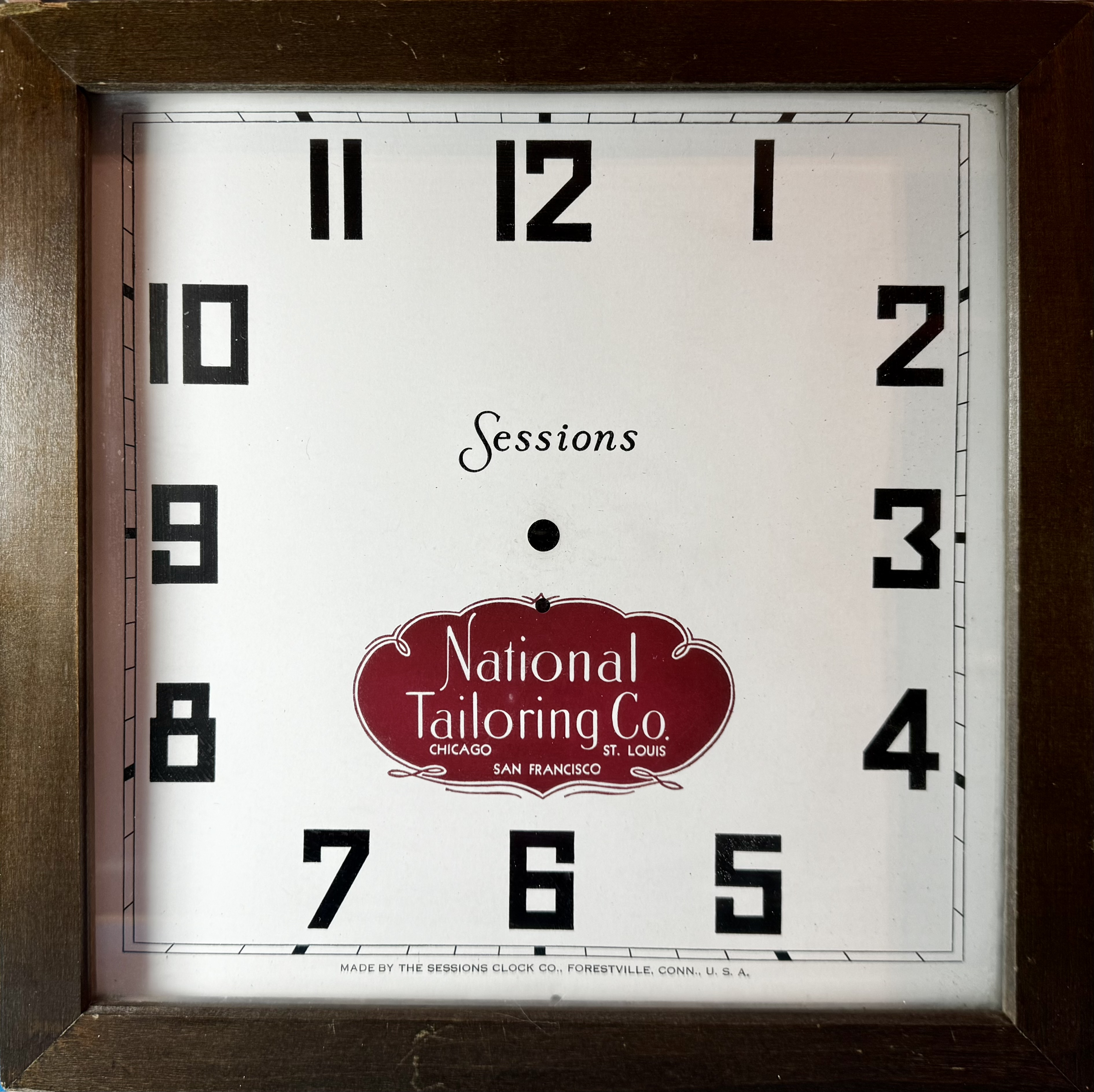
Early 1950s electric model

In 1902, William E Sessions and other family members purchased a controlling interest in the E.N. Welch Company, a clock manufacturer located in Forestville, Connecticut. Sessions' father owned a foundry located in Bristol, Connecticut, that produced cases for E.N Welch Co. On January 9, 1903, the company was reorganized as The Sessions Clock Company.

Within a few years the Sessions Clock Company was producing clock movements, cases, dials, artwork and castings for their line of mechanical clocks. Between 1903 and 1933 Sessions produced 52 models of mechanical clocks, ranging from Advertisers, large and small clocks with logos of various businesses, to wall, or regulator clocks, and shelf or mantel clocks, designed for the home. Many of the Session clocks from this period are prized by collectors.

In 1930, the company expanded to produce electric clocks and timers for radios, while continuing to produce traditional brass mechanical movements. Beginning at the end of World War II Sessions W Model (electric) was widely used by various casting companies for their clocks. The dial of the W Model read Movement by Sessions. In the early 1950s Sessions begin to produce timers for television.

In 1956, Sessions was absorbed by a company interested mainly in their timing devices. In 1959, William K. Sessions, grandson of William E. Sessions, left the Sessions Clock Company and formed the New England Clock Company. In 1960, one of the Sessions Clock buildings was sold to the Bristol Instrument Gears Company.

Kept as the Sessions Company, the new owners ran the operation until 1969 when changes in the market forced the Sessions Company into liquidation. In 1970, the remaining buildings were sold to Dabko Industries, a machine parts manufacturer.

Sessions Clock Company Mechanical Clock Models

Adair; Advertising No. 4; Aquarius; Asia; Assortment No. 3; Clinton; Concord; Cottage No. 1; Cottage No. 3-1921; Dickory, Dickory, Dock Model 5; Dover; Drop Octagon, 12 Inch; Drop Octagon, 8 Inch; Drop Octagon, 9 Inch; Duet No. 1-1927; Duke; Eclipse; Eiffiel; Elite No. 37-38; Elsa; Elton; Foyer; Gothic No. 201; Grand No. 2; Grand No. 2-1915; Halifax; Home Assortment; Home No. 1; Home No. 3; Hyannis; Juanita; Jewel; Kitchlok (2); Model 2W; Model 463-W; No. 9224; Office No. 150, 10 Inch; Plymouth; Preferences No. TK53; Puritan; Ramona; Regulator E; Regulator H; Regulator No. 2; Regulator No. 3; Regulator No. 4; Regulator No. 5; Regulator No. 6; Reta; Spice No. 1TK54; St. Clair; Star Pointer; Superior No. 3-1915; Unique 1; Unique No. 1; Verdi; Washington; Weldon; Westminster 416 WC; Westminster Chime C
