= Whittington chimes =

Clock chime melody

Whittington chimes, also called St. Mary's, are a family of clock chime melodies associated with St Mary-le-Bow church in London, which is related to the historical figure of Whittington by legend. Whittington is usually the secondary chime selection for most chiming clocks, the first being the Westminster. It is also one of two clock chime melodies with multiple variations, the other being the Ave Maria chimes.

Before the name Whittington became common, the melody used to be referred to as “chimes on eight bells”. However, evidence suggests it was originally a chime on six bells – a melody that has not been in use at St Mary-le-Bow since 1666. In 1905, based on what was known about the six-bell version, Sir Charles Villiers Stanford composed a new melody (still called Whittington chimes) that uses 11 out of the 12 bells in the tower of St Mary-le-Bow; this 11-bell version is the one now used at that church.

== Dick Whittington story ==
The customary English theatre story, adapted from the life of the real Richard Whittington, is that the young boy Dick Whittington was an unhappy apprentice running away from his master, and heard the tune ringing from the bell tower of the church of St Mary-le-Bow in London in 1392. The penniless boy heard the bells seemingly saying to him "Turn again Dick Whittington". Dick returned to London upon hearing the bells, where he went on to find his fortune and became the Lord Mayor of London four times.

According to tradition, Whittington used the tune as a campaign song for his three returns to the office of mayor. A short version of the campaign song goes:

Turn again Dick Whittington,
Right Lord Mayor of London Town.

== Chimes of St Mary-le-Bow ==
The twelve bells in the tower of St Mary-le-Bow, cast in 1956, all have inscriptions on them; the first letters of each inscription spell out:

D W H I T T I N G T O N

== Chimes on domestic clocks ==
One version of the Whittington Chimes.

The Whittington chimes are less well known than the Westminster (Cambridge) chimes, despite being much older. The chimes are found in many early English bracket and longcase clocks. The melody was not given the name "Whittington Chimes" on domestic clocks until the late Victorian period onwards.

Whittington chimes found on domestic clocks are variations on the eight-bell melody, and there are at least four variations of this chime sequence. Currently the Whittington chime is often available on grandfather clock movements that have selectable chimes and some quartz clocks.

=== Bawo & Dotter Chimes ===
One of the Whittington chime variations is also known as the Bawo & Dotter chimes, and is usually found on many older German movements such as early models of Junghans grandfather clocks. This version of the chimes is remarkably different and unique from the other three variations; only the first-quarter melody remains the same with the other variations.
