= Timothy Mason (clockmaker) =

English clockmaker (1695–1734)

Timothy Mason (1695–1734) was a clockmaker based in Gainsborough, Lincolnshire, England.

Mason was known for constructing longcase clocks with eight-day movements, with two keyholes on either side of the dial. They were driven by two weights; one driving the pendulum and the other the striking mechanism. His clock faces were always signed Tim Mason.

He was known to be working at an address given as Lords Street in Gainsborough. A copy of Tim Mason’s inventory and personal estate dated 22 January 1734 does not contain any items of trade listed and the certified value of his assets is £9.13.6. From this it appears that he was retired when he died in 1734 having disposed of his stock, work in progress and tools of his trade.

From the records held by the Derbyshire Record Office, Reference D37 M/T693-694: “The Crossells Farm, Stretton: Lease and release by Timothy Mason of Gainsborough (co. Lincoln) clock-maker and Elizabeth his wife, and John Clay of Hartsloft in the parish of Ault Hucknall yeoman to Hannah Holland o Ford widow of the Overclose in Stretton, Consideration £42. Dated 3–4 December 1714.”

== Gallery ==
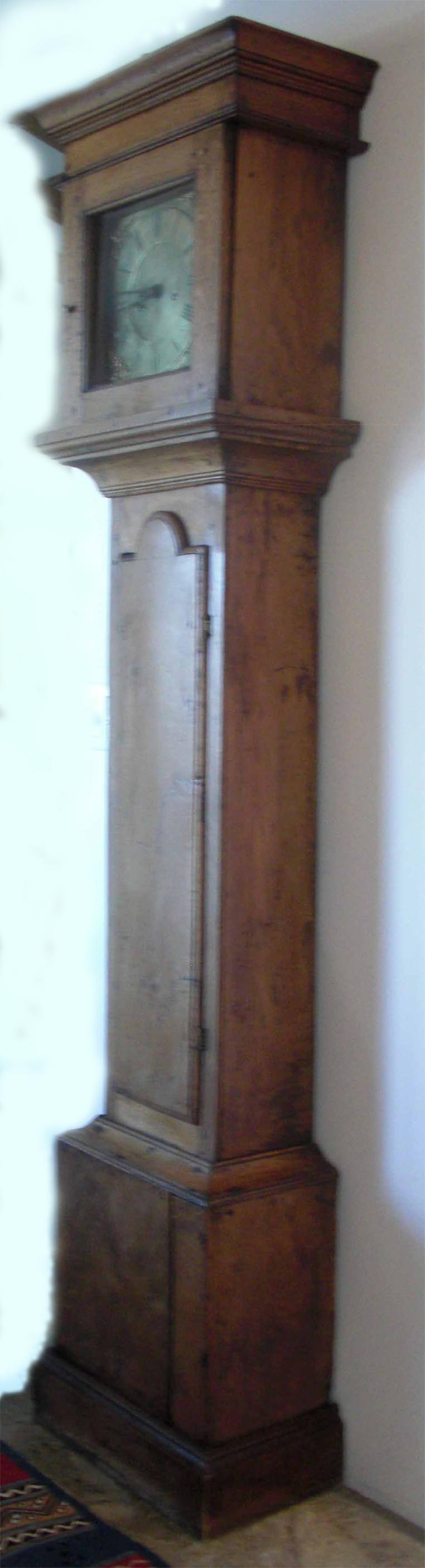
Longcase clock c. 1730 by Timothy Mason of Gainsborough

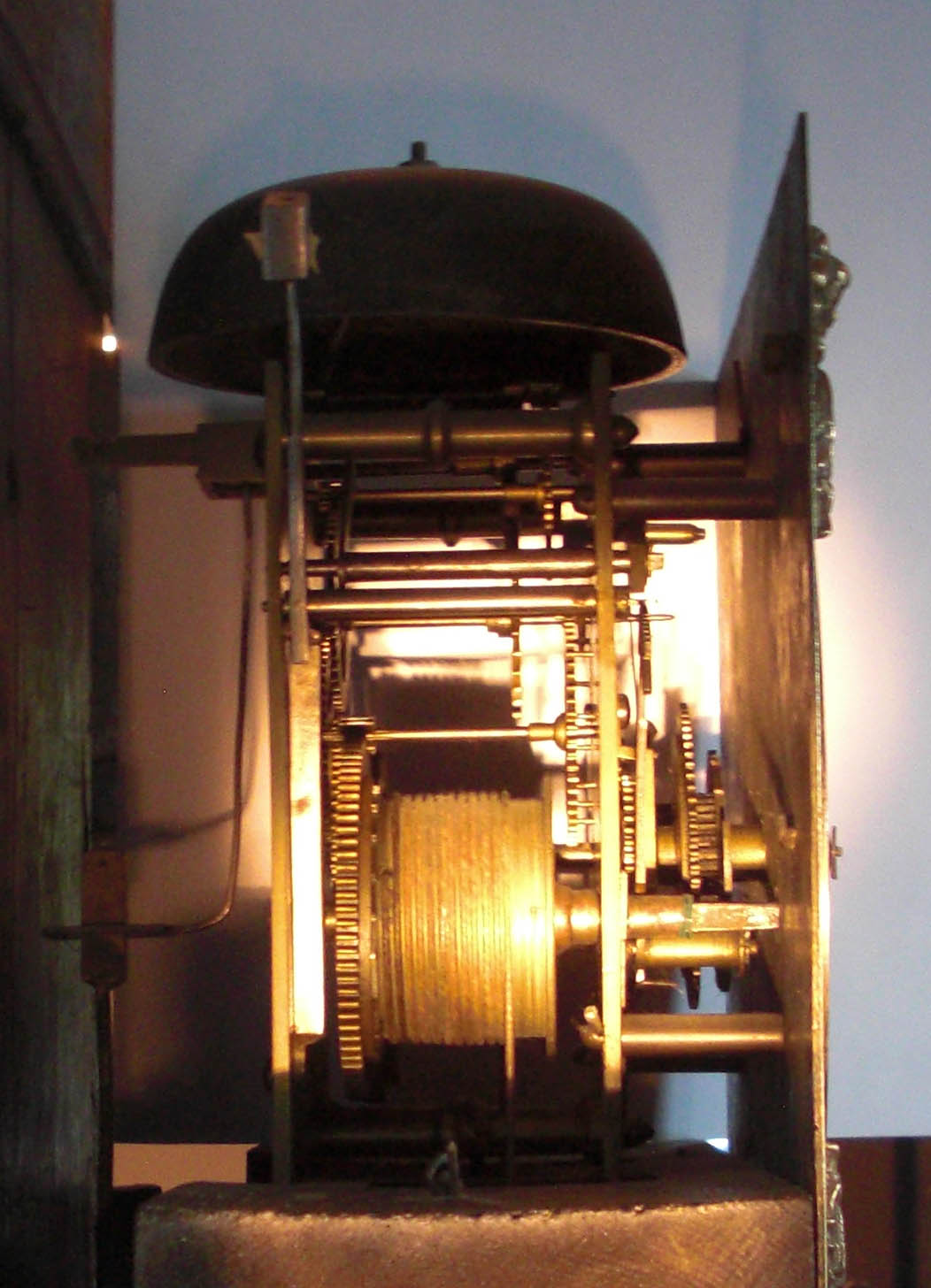
Lateral view of a Timothy Mason longcase clock movement with striking mechanism, c. 1730

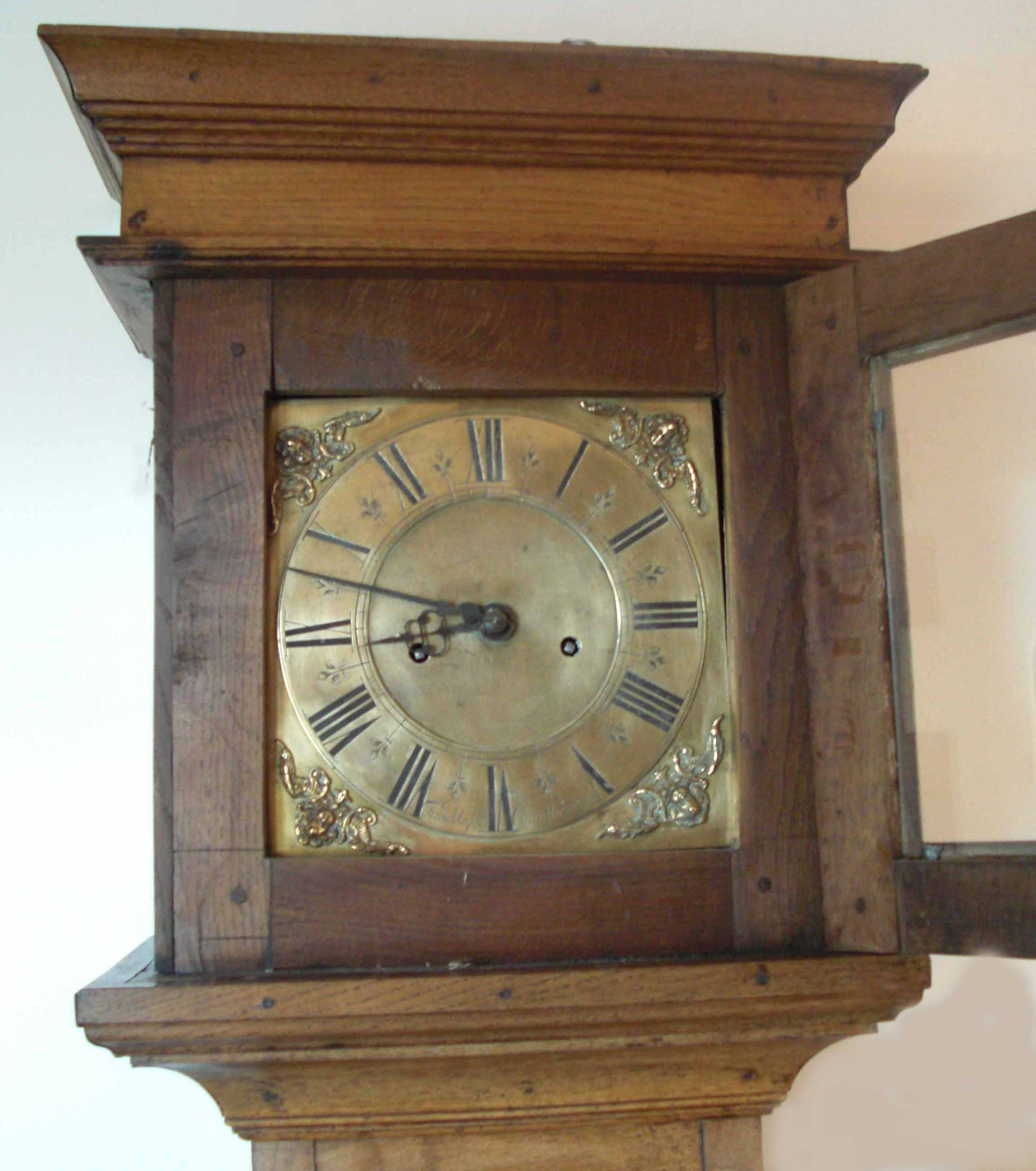
Clock face c. 1730 clockmaker Tim Mason of Gainsborough

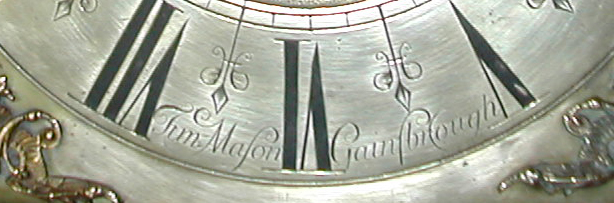
Clock face signature of Tim Mason
