= 2025 NASCAR Cup Series Championship Race =

NASCAR Cup Series Championship race

Race details
- Race 36 of 36 in the 2025 NASCAR Cup Series
- Date: November 2, 2025
- Location: Phoenix Raceway in Avondale, Arizona
- Course: Permanent racing facility
- Course length: 1.022 miles (1.645 km)
- Distance: 319 laps, 319 mi (524.755 km)
- Scheduled distance: 312 laps, 312 mi (502.115 km)
- Average speed: 97.711 miles per hour (157.251 km/h)

Pole position
Driver	Denny Hamlin	Joe Gibbs Racing
- Time: 26.914

Most laps led
Driver	Denny Hamlin	Joe Gibbs Racing
- Laps: 208

Fastest lap
Driver	Denny Hamlin	Joe Gibbs Racing
- Time: 27.566

Winner
No. 12	Ryan Blaney	Team Penske

Television in the United States
- Network: NBC
- Announcers: Leigh Diffey, Jeff Burton, and Steve Letarte

Radio in the United States
- Radio: MRN
- Booth announcers: Alex Hayden, Mike Bagley, and Todd Gordon
- Turn announcers: Dave Moody (1 & 2) and Tim Catafalmo (3 & 4)

The 2025 NASCAR Cup Series Championship Race was a NASCAR Cup Series race held on November 2, 2025, at Phoenix Raceway in Avondale, Arizona. Contested over 319 laps, extended from 312 laps due to an overtime finish, on the one-mile (1.6 km) oval, it was the 36th and final race of the 2025 NASCAR Cup Series season.

Ryan Blaney won the race. Brad Keselowski finished 2nd, and Kyle Larson finished 3rd to claim his second Cup Series championship. Joey Logano and Kyle Busch rounded out the top five, and Denny Hamlin, having led 208 laps, finished second in the championship standings, Josh Berry, Michael McDowell, Ryan Preece, and Chase Elliott rounded out the top ten.

This was the final championship race held at Phoenix as the event will move to Homestead–Miami Speedway. Phoenix will host the championship race, but will be on a "rotating" schedule. It was also the final championship race as part of the playoff system used since 2014, as it would be scrapped in favor of a return to the "Chase" format from 2026.

== Report ==
=== Background ===
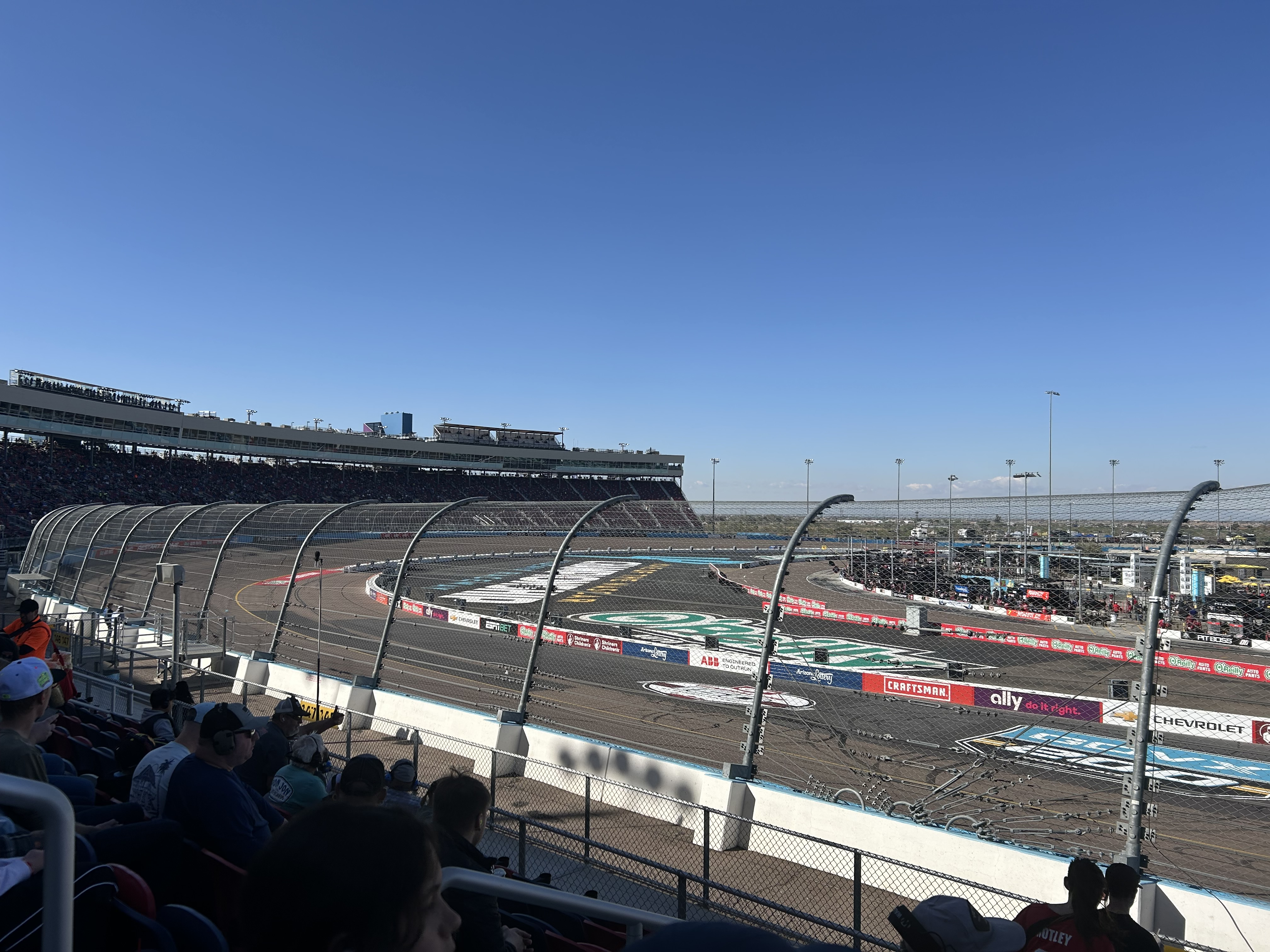
Phoenix Raceway, the track where the race was held.

Phoenix Raceway – also known as PIR – is a one-mile, low-banked tri-oval race track located in Avondale, Arizona. It is named after the nearby metropolitan area of Phoenix. The motorsport track opened in 1964 and currently hosts two NASCAR race weekends annually. PIR has also hosted the IndyCar Series, CART, USAC and the Rolex Sports Car Series. The raceway is currently owned and operated by International Speedway Corporation.

The raceway was originally constructed with a 2.5 mi (4.0 km) road course that ran both inside and outside of the main tri-oval. In 1991, the track was reconfigured with the current 1.51 mi (2.43 km) interior layout. PIR has an estimated grandstand seating capacity of around 67,000. Lights were installed around the track in 2004 following the addition of a second annual NASCAR race weekend.

Phoenix Raceway is home to two annual NASCAR race weekends, one of 13 facilities on the NASCAR schedule to host more than one race weekend a year. The track is both the first and last stop in the western United States, as well as the fourth, and hosts the championship race on the schedule. In 2026, Homestead-Miami would host the championship race, while Phoenix would retain its second date, initially in the Round of 8. On January 12, 2026, NASCAR announced that the Playoffs system would be removed in favor of a 10-race "Chase" format similar to the one used from 2004 to 2013.

==== Championship drivers ====
- Denny Hamlin was the first of four drivers to clinch a spot in the Championship 4, winning at Las Vegas.
- Chase Briscoe clinched the second spot in the Championship 4, winning at Talladega.
- William Byron clinched the third spot in the Championship 4, winning at Martinsville.
- Kyle Larson clinched the final spot in the Championship 4 at Martinsville.

==== Entry list ====
- (R) denotes rookie driver.
- (i) denotes driver who is ineligible for series driver points.
- (CC) denotes championship contender.

No.	Driver	Team	Manufacturer
1	Ross Chastain	Trackhouse Racing	Chevrolet
2	Austin Cindric	Team Penske	Ford
3	Austin Dillon	Richard Childress Racing	Chevrolet
4	Noah Gragson	Front Row Motorsports	Ford
5	Kyle Larson (CC)	Hendrick Motorsports	Chevrolet
6	Brad Keselowski	RFK Racing	Ford
7	Justin Haley	Spire Motorsports	Chevrolet
8	Kyle Busch	Richard Childress Racing	Chevrolet
9	Chase Elliott	Hendrick Motorsports	Chevrolet
10	Ty Dillon	Kaulig Racing	Chevrolet
11	Denny Hamlin (CC)	Joe Gibbs Racing	Toyota
12	Ryan Blaney	Team Penske	Ford
16	A. J. Allmendinger	Kaulig Racing	Chevrolet
17	Chris Buescher	RFK Racing	Ford
19	Chase Briscoe (CC)	Joe Gibbs Racing	Toyota
20	Christopher Bell	Joe Gibbs Racing	Toyota
21	Josh Berry	Wood Brothers Racing	Ford
22	Joey Logano	Team Penske	Ford
23	Bubba Wallace	23XI Racing	Toyota
24	William Byron (CC)	Hendrick Motorsports	Chevrolet
34	Todd Gilliland	Front Row Motorsports	Ford
35	Riley Herbst (R)	23XI Racing	Toyota
38	Zane Smith	Front Row Motorsports	Ford
41	Cole Custer	Haas Factory Team	Ford
42	John Hunter Nemechek	Legacy Motor Club	Toyota
43	Erik Jones	Legacy Motor Club	Toyota
44	J. J. Yeley (i)	NY Racing Team	Chevrolet
45	Tyler Reddick	23XI Racing	Toyota
47	Ricky Stenhouse Jr.	Hyak Motorsports	Chevrolet
48	Alex Bowman	Hendrick Motorsports	Chevrolet
51	Cody Ware	Rick Ware Racing	Ford
54	Ty Gibbs	Joe Gibbs Racing	Toyota
60	Ryan Preece	RFK Racing	Ford
66	Casey Mears (i)	Garage 66	Chevrolet
71	Michael McDowell	Spire Motorsports	Chevrolet
77	Carson Hocevar	Spire Motorsports	Chevrolet
88	Shane van Gisbergen (R)	Trackhouse Racing	Chevrolet
99	Daniel Suárez	Trackhouse Racing	Chevrolet
Official entry list

== Practice ==
Ty Gibbs was the fastest in the practice session with a time of 27.300 seconds and a speed of 131.868 mph (212.221 km/h).

=== Practice results ===
Pos	No.	Driver	Team	Manufacturer	Time	Speed
1	54	Ty Gibbs	Joe Gibbs Racing	Toyota	27.300	131.868
2	12	Ryan Blaney	Team Penske	Ford	27.396	131.406
3	2	Austin Cindric	Team Penske	Ford	27.402	131.377
Official practice results

== Qualifying ==
Denny Hamlin scored the pole for the race with a time of 26.914 and a speed of 133.759 mph (215.264 km/h).

=== Qualifying results ===
Pos	No.	Driver	Team	Manufacturer	Time	Speed
1	11	Denny Hamlin (CC)	Joe Gibbs Racing	Toyota	26.914	133.759
2	24	William Byron (CC)	Hendrick Motorsports	Chevrolet	26.956	133.551
3	5	Kyle Larson (CC)	Hendrick Motorsports	Chevrolet	26.979	133.437
4	2	Austin Cindric	Team Penske	Ford	27.017	133.249
5	12	Ryan Blaney	Team Penske	Ford	27.029	133.190
6	77	Carson Hocevar	Spire Motorsports	Chevrolet	27.039	133.141
7	21	Josh Berry	Wood Brothers Racing	Ford	27.093	132.876
8	48	Alex Bowman	Hendrick Motorsports	Chevrolet	27.094	132.871
9	17	Chris Buescher	RFK Racing	Ford	27.111	132.787
10	22	Joey Logano	Team Penske	Ford	27.119	132.748
11	8	Kyle Busch	Richard Childress Racing	Chevrolet	27.129	132.699
12	19	Chase Briscoe (CC)	Joe Gibbs Racing	Toyota	27.133	132.680
13	1	Ross Chastain	Trackhouse Racing	Chevrolet	27.137	132.660
14	99	Daniel Suárez	Trackhouse Racing	Chevrolet	27.143	132.631
15	43	Erik Jones	Legacy Motor Club	Toyota	27.154	132.577
16	47	Ricky Stenhouse Jr.	Hyak Motorsports	Chevrolet	27.172	132.489
17	9	Chase Elliott	Hendrick Motorsports	Chevrolet	27.176	132.470
18	4	Noah Gragson	Front Row Motorsports	Ford	27.184	132.431
19	6	Brad Keselowski	RFK Racing	Ford	27.189	132.406
20	20	Christopher Bell	Joe Gibbs Racing	Toyota	27.196	132.372
21	60	Ryan Preece	RFK Racing	Ford	27.197	132.368
22	38	Zane Smith	Front Row Motorsports	Ford	27.218	132.265
23	23	Bubba Wallace	23XI Racing	Toyota	27.219	132.261
24	45	Tyler Reddick	23XI Racing	Toyota	27.220	132.256
25	54	Ty Gibbs	Joe Gibbs Racing	Toyota	27.238	132.168
26	3	Austin Dillon	Richard Childress Racing	Chevrolet	27.243	132.144
27	41	Cole Custer	Haas Factory Team	Ford	27.244	132.139
28	42	John Hunter Nemechek	Legacy Motor Club	Toyota	27.251	132.105
29	7	Justin Haley	Spire Motorsports	Chevrolet	27.300	131.868
30	34	Todd Gilliland	Front Row Motorsports	Ford	27.306	131.839
31	88	Shane Van Gisbergen (R)	Trackhouse Racing	Chevrolet	27.316	131.791
32	35	Riley Herbst (R)	23XI Racing	Toyota	27.359	131.584
33	51	Cody Ware	Rick Ware Racing	Ford	27.445	131.171
34	10	Ty Dillon	Kaulig Racing	Chevrolet	27.522	130.804
35	44	J. J. Yeley (i)	NY Racing Team	Chevrolet	27.720	129.870
36	66	Casey Mears (i)	Garage 66	Ford	27.765	129.660
37	71	Michael McDowell	Spire Motorsports	Chevrolet	27.959	128.760
38	16	A. J. Allmendinger	Kaulig Racing	Chevrolet	0.000	0.000
Official qualifying results

== Race ==
- Note: Denny Hamlin, William Byron, Kyle Larson, and Chase Briscoe were not eligible for stage points because of their participation in the Championship 4.

=== Race results ===
==== Stage results ====
Stage One Laps: 60

Pos	No	Driver	Team	Manufacturer	Points
1	24	William Byron (CC)	Hendrick Motorsports	Chevrolet	0
2	12	Ryan Blaney	Team Penske	Ford	9
3	11	Denny Hamlin (CC)	Joe Gibbs Racing	Toyota	0
4	2	Austin Cindric	Team Penske	Ford	7
5	5	Kyle Larson (CC)	Hendrick Motorsports	Chevrolet	0
6	77	Carson Hocevar	Spire Motorsports	Chevrolet	5
7	48	Alex Bowman	Hendrick Motorsports	Chevrolet	4
8	22	Joey Logano	Team Penske	Ford	3
9	17	Chris Buescher	RFK Racing	Ford	2
10	19	Chase Briscoe (CC)	Joe Gibbs Racing	Toyota	0
Official stage one results

Stage Two Laps: 125

Pos	No	Driver	Team	Manufacturer	Points
1	11	Denny Hamlin (CC)	Joe Gibbs Racing	Toyota	0
2	12	Ryan Blaney	Team Penske	Ford	9
3	24	William Byron (CC)	Hendrick Motorsports	Chevrolet	0
4	5	Kyle Larson (CC)	Hendrick Motorsports	Chevrolet	0
5	20	Christopher Bell	Joe Gibbs Racing	Toyota	6
6	1	Ross Chastain	Trackhouse Racing	Chevrolet	5
7	19	Chase Briscoe (CC)	Joe Gibbs Racing	Toyota	0
8	22	Joey Logano	Team Penske	Ford	3
9	77	Carson Hocevar	Spire Motorsports	Chevrolet	2
10	9	Chase Elliott	Hendrick Motorsports	Chevrolet	1
Official stage two results

=== Final Stage results ===
Stage Three Laps: 127

Pos	Grid	No	Driver	Team	Manufacturer	Laps	Points
1	5	12	Ryan Blaney	Team Penske	Ford	319	58
2	19	6	Brad Keselowski	RFK Racing	Ford	319	35
3	3	5	Kyle Larson (CC)	Hendrick Motorsports	Chevrolet	319	34
4	10	22	Joey Logano	Team Penske	Ford	319	39
5	11	8	Kyle Busch	Richard Childress Racing	Chevrolet	319	32
6	1	11	Denny Hamlin (CC)	Joe Gibbs Racing	Toyota	319	31
7	7	21	Josh Berry	Wood Brothers Racing	Ford	319	30
8	37	71	Michael McDowell	Spire Motorsports	Chevrolet	319	29
9	21	60	Ryan Preece	RFK Racing	Ford	319	28
10	17	9	Chase Elliott	Hendrick Motorsports	Chevrolet	319	28
11	20	20	Christopher Bell	Joe Gibbs Racing	Toyota	319	32
12	9	17	Chris Buescher	RFK Racing	Ford	319	27
13	13	1	Ross Chastain	Trackhouse Racing	Chevrolet	319	29
14	29	7	Justin Haley	Spire Motorsports	Chevrolet	319	23
15	8	48	Alex Bowman	Hendrick Motorsports	Chevrolet	319	26
16	15	43	Erik Jones	Legacy Motor Club	Toyota	319	21
17	16	47	Ricky Stenhouse Jr.	Hyak Motorsports	Chevrolet	319	20
18	12	19	Chase Briscoe (CC)	Joe Gibbs Racing	Toyota	319	19
19	14	99	Daniel Suárez	Trackhouse Racing	Chevrolet	319	18
20	26	3	Austin Dillon	Richard Childress Racing	Chevrolet	319	17
21	25	54	Ty Gibbs	Joe Gibbs Racing	Toyota	319	16
22	30	34	Todd Gilliland	Front Row Motorsports	Ford	319	15
23	32	35	Riley Herbst (R)	23XI Racing	Toyota	319	14
24	31	88	Shane van Gisbergen (R)	Trackhouse Racing	Chevrolet	319	13
25	27	41	Cole Custer	Haas Factory Team	Ford	319	12
26	24	45	Tyler Reddick	23XI Racing	Toyota	319	11
27	18	4	Noah Gragson	Front Row Motorsports	Ford	319	10
28	6	77	Carson Hocevar	Spire Motorsports	Chevrolet	319	16
29	22	38	Zane Smith	Front Row Motorsports	Ford	319	8
30	33	51	Cody Ware	Rick Ware Racing	Ford	319	7
31	28	42	John Hunter Nemechek	Legacy Motor Club	Toyota	319	6
32	35	44	J. J. Yeley (i)	NY Racing Team	Chevrolet	317	0
33	2	24	William Byron (CC)	Hendrick Motorsports	Chevrolet	317	4
34	4	2	Austin Cindric	Team Penske	Ford	301	10
35	34	10	Ty Dillon	Kaulig Racing	Chevrolet	296	2
36	36	66	Casey Mears (i)	Garage 66	Ford	284	0
37	23	23	Bubba Wallace	23XI Racing	Toyota	165	1
38	38	16	A. J. Allmendinger	Kaulig Racing	Chevrolet	146	1
Official race results

=== Race statistics ===
- Lead changes: 16 among 6 different drivers
- Cautions/Laps: 9 for 65
- Red flags: 0
- Time of race: 3 hours, 15 minutes, and 53 seconds
- Average speed: 97.711 miles per hour (157.251 km/h)

== Media ==
=== Television ===
NBC covered the race on the television side. Leigh Diffey, two–time Phoenix winner Jeff Burton, and Steve Letarte called the race from the broadcast booth. Dave Burns, Kim Coon, Parker Kligerman, and Marty Snider handled the pit road duties from pit lane. Although NBC would continue to broadcast NASCAR races in 2026 and beyond, this was the last race to be produced by NBC Sports, as all NBC NASCAR broadcasts would now be produced by USA Sports following USA's move from NBCUniversal to Versant.

NBC
Booth announcers	Pit reporters
Lap-by-lap: Leigh Diffey; Color-commentator: Jeff Burton; Color-commentator: Steve Letarte	Dave Burns; Kim Coon; Parker Kligerman; Marty Snider

=== Radio ===
The race was broadcast on radio by the Motor Racing Network and simulcast on Sirius XM NASCAR Radio. Alex Hayden, Mike Bagley and Todd Gordon called the action from the broadcast booth when the field races down the front straightaway. Dave Moody called the action from turns 1 & 2 and Tim Catafalmo called the action from turns 3 & 4. MRN Radio Lead Pit Reporter Steve Post, Jacklyn Drake, PRN Radio's Brad Gillie, and Chris Wilner covered the action for MRN from pit lane.

MRN Radio
Booth announcers	Turn announcers	Pit reporters
Lead announcer: Alex Hayden; Announcer: Mike Bagley; Announcer: Todd Gordon	Turns 1 & 2: Dave Moody; Turns 3 & 4: Tim Catafalmo	Steve Post; Jacklyn Drake; Brad Gillie; Chris Wilner

== Standings after the race ==
Drivers' Championship standings

	Pos	Driver	Points
3	1	Kyle Larson	5,034
	2	Denny Hamlin	5,031 (–3)
2	3	Chase Briscoe	5,019 (–15)
1	4	William Byron	5,004 (–30)
	5	Christopher Bell	2,403 (–2,631)
	6	Ryan Blaney	2,373 (–2,661)
1	7	Joey Logano	2,330 (–2,704)
1	8	Chase Elliott	2,310 (–2,724)
2	9	Tyler Reddick	2,309 (–2,725)
1	10	Ross Chastain	2,272 (–2,762)
1	11	Bubba Wallace	2,256 (–2,778)
	12	Shane van Gisbergen	2,211 (–2,823)
	13	Alex Bowman	2,192 (–2,842)
	14	Austin Cindric	2,156 (–2,878)
	15	Austin Dillon	2,152 (–2,882)
	16	Josh Berry	2,150 (–2,884)
Official driver's standings

Manufacturers' Championship standings

Pos	Manufacturer	Points
1	Chevrolet	1,310
2	Toyota	1,281 (–29)
3	Ford	1,210 (–100)

- Note: Only the first 16 positions are included for the driver standings.

Previous race: 2025 Xfinity 500	NASCAR Cup Series; 2025 season	Next race: 2026 Cook Out Clash (exhibition); 2026 Daytona 500 (points)
