= Richard Donisthorp =

English clockmaker

- Occupation: Clockmaker
- Years active: circa 1780–1800

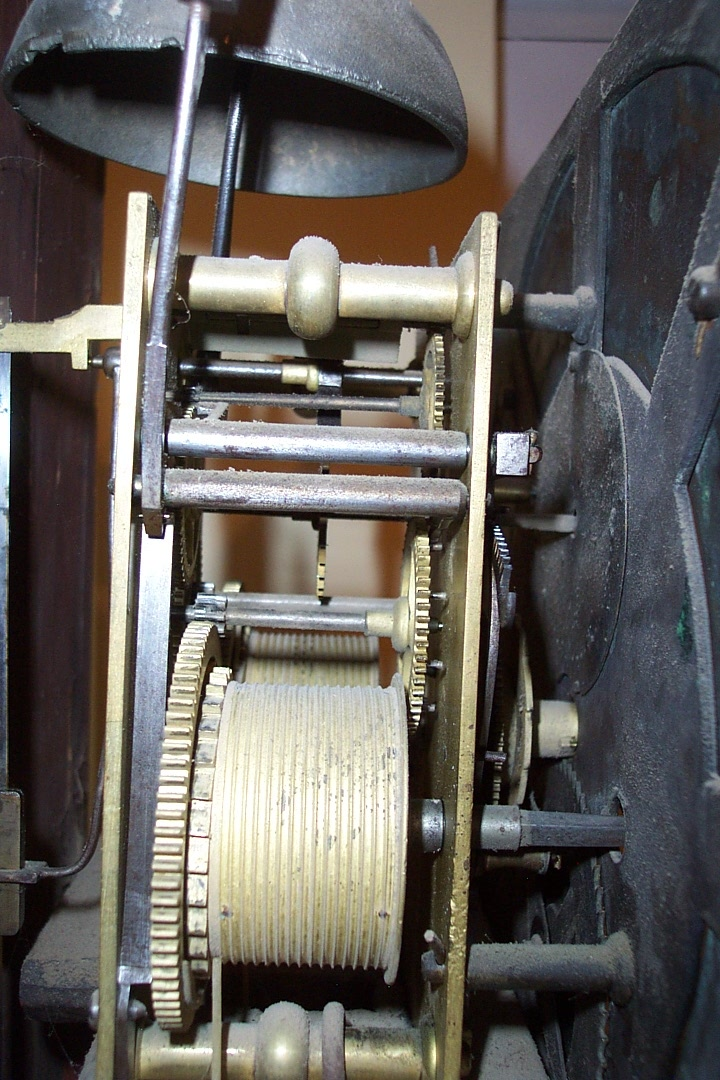
A Richard Donisthorp 8-day weight-driven long case movement, with date dial

Richard Donisthorp (fl. 1797) was an English clockmaker in Loughborough. He used the surname (spelt Donisthorp) as an engraved signature on the clock faces he made, and was a member of the Donisthorp family, who were Leicestershire clockmakers. The name of Donisthorp appears in records also as Donisthorpe.

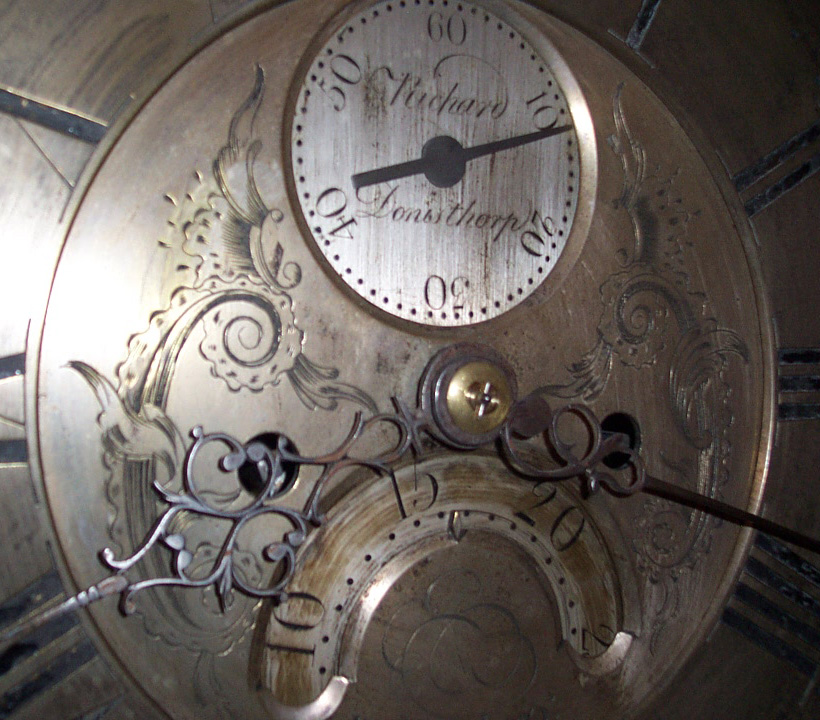
Detail from the face of the same clock, showing the spelling as 'Donisthorp'
