= Howard Miller Clock Company =

American clock and furnishing manufacturer

Howard Miller Company
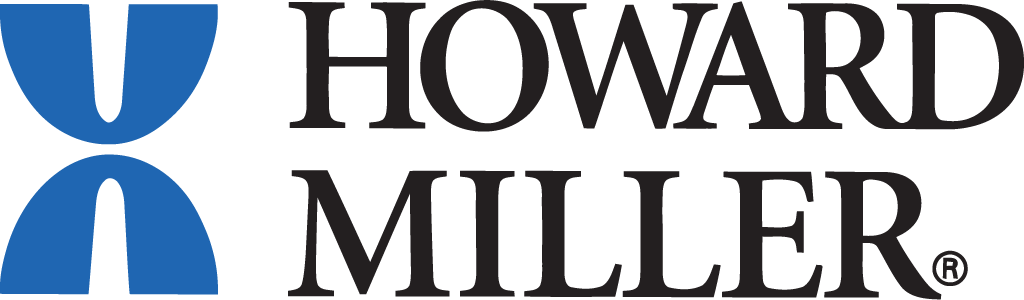
- Type: Private
- Industry: Clocks; Furniture
- Founded: 1926
- Headquarters: Zeeland, Michigan, U.S.
- Key people: Howard "Buzz" Miller, President; Jim O'Keefe Vice President
- Products: Longcase clocks Curio Cabinets, Wall Clocks Mantle Clocks Wine and Spirits Furnishings
- Owner: Huizenga Group
- Website: www.howardmiller.com

The Howard Miller Company is an American manufacturer of clocks and home furnishings, based in Zeeland, Michigan. It is the world's largest manufacturer of grandfather clocks.

== History ==
Howard Miller Clock Company was founded in 1926, as the Herman Miller Clock Company division of office furniture manufacturer Herman Miller, specializing in chiming wall and mantle clocks. It was spun off in 1937 and renamed, under the leadership of co-founder Herman Miller's son Howard C. Miller (1905–1995). Today, there is no connection between the two companies, although their headquarters are across the street from one another.

Starting in 1947, the Howard Miller Clock Company produced scores of modern wall clocks and table clocks designed by George Nelson Associates. (At that time, Nelson was Director of Design at Herman Miller Furniture Company.) They also produced Nelson's "Bubble Lighting" through the late 1970s, selling the business in the early 1980s. (Using the original manufacturing equipment developed by Nelson Associates with Howard Miller, the California furniture company Modernica reintroduced the Bubble Lamps in the 1990s and has been the exclusive manufacturer and worldwide distributor of the lamps since that time). Howard Miller Clock Company also produced other Nelson Associates products; spice cabinets, pull-down wall mounted vanities and desks, a vertical hanging vinyl strip system called "Ribbon Wall" (which was available in many different variations from 12 inches to 84" wide and 12" to 144" high), a complete line of fireplace tools, and other hanging lighting (Metalites, Net Lights, Bubbles, and Lanterns)

A number of Nelson's clocks became icons of the era; the Ball, Spike, Block, Spindle, and others were good sellers and have been reissued by Vitra, as well as most of the Zoo Timers clocks, and a select group of table models.

In the 1960s, a line of ceramic wall clocks called "Meridian" was produced using ceramic wall plates designed in Italy and using the Nelson clock hands. This line, as well as the other Nelson clocks and other pieces, was distributed by Richards Morganthau, Inc. (also known as Raymor).

One of the last series of modern clocks were the "Swing Timers", a group of at least 18 inexpensive all plastic clocks produced in the late 1960s, and designed by Arthur Umanoff Associates. Umanoff also designed Plexiglas floor and wall clocks, a series of wood clocks called "Natural Classics", and "Day Timers" (plastic wall clocks with day and dates). Nathan George Horwitt designed the "Museum Clock" in the 1970s (both wall and table model). The final George Nelson Associates series of clocks were the 1984 post-modern "Tempo '21 Series".

The modern Nelson and Umanoff clocks were discontinued and these days, the company has little to no interest in that period of modern design.

=== Expansion ===
Originally the company only made mantel clocks. Grandfather clocks did not become a part of the product line until the 1960s. The company began making curio cabinets in 1989.

The company acquired Ridgeway Clocks by 2004.

In 1983, the company acquired Hekman Furniture and Alexis Manufacturing. In 1993, the company acquired Woodmark Upholstery, and Kieninger, a German manufacturer of clock movements.

In 2008, the company began producing a line of furniture in collaboration with Ty Pennington, then-host of ABC's Extreme Makeover: Home Edition.

As of 2025, the company's CEO is Howard "Buzz" Miller, grandson of the company's namesake founder.

=== Reversed closure and acquisition by J.C. Huizenga ===
In July 2025, Howard Miller announced that it would cease all of its operations, citing poor housing market conditions and the impact of tariffs in the second Trump administration on its supply chain. The company said that it had been unable to find a buyer to continue operations, and plans to wind down production by the end of 2025 and finish selling its remaining inventory by 2026. The closures will result in the loss of 195 jobs between its Michigan headquarters, a plant near Traverse City, Michigan, and two facilities in North Carolina. A clearance sale of outstanding inventory was planned at the company's headquarters and scheduled to run from November 1–8, 2025.

On May 7, 2026, Howard Miller was acquired by the Huizenga Group, an investment firm owned by National Heritage Academies founder J.C. Huizenga. It was announced that the company's memorial products division, which made urns, keepsakes, and memorial medallions, was acquired by longtime Howard Miller executives Andrew Christmann and Eric Greenberg and would operate separately as Howard Miller Memorial LLC.
