= Hermle Clocks =

Luxury clock maker

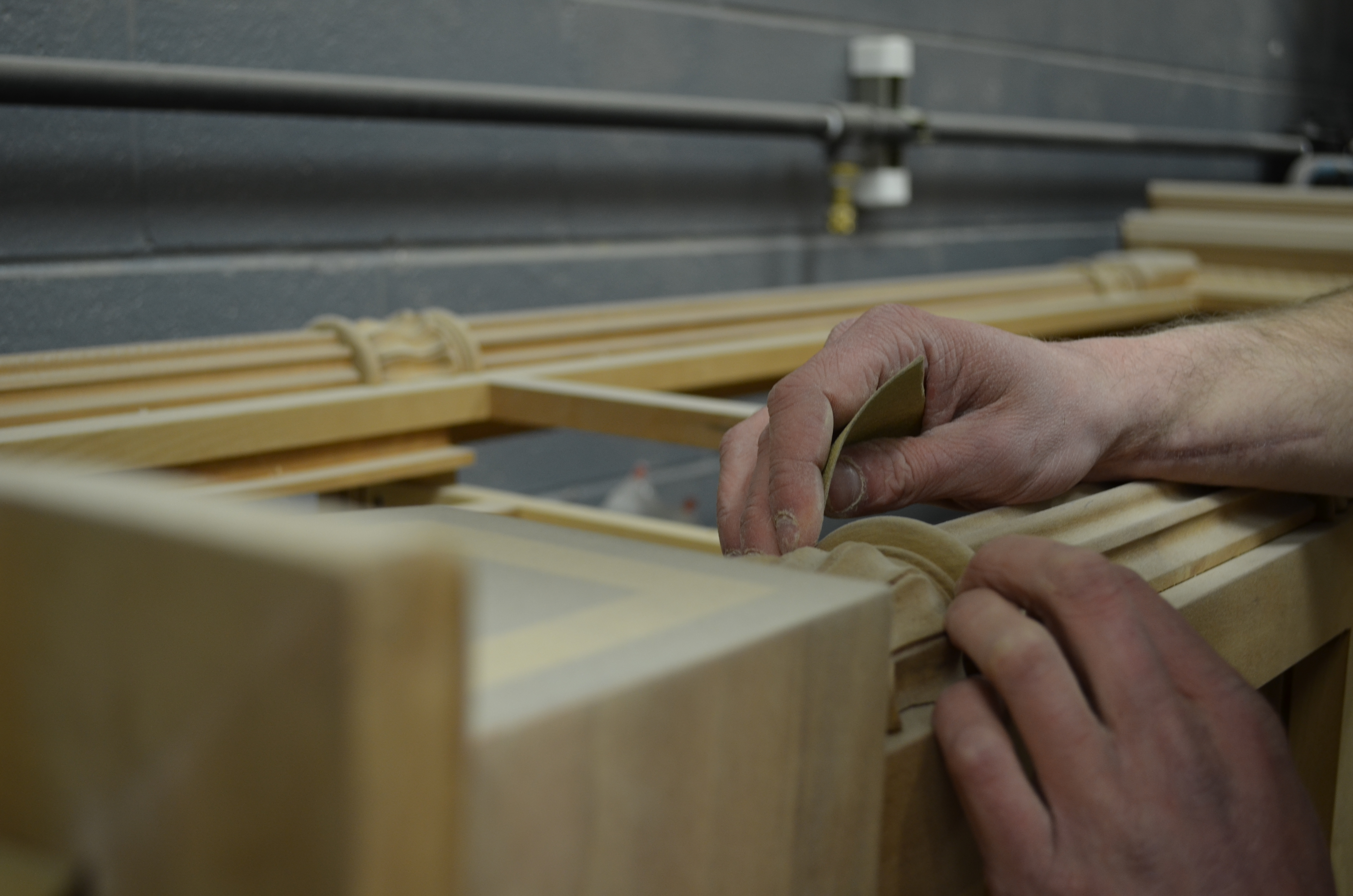
A craftsmen sands a grandfather clock

Hermle Clocks (HUM Uhrenmanufaktur GmbH & Co. KG) was founded in 1922 in the Gosheim, Swabian Alb region of Southern Germany by Franz Hermle & Sons. By 1930, Hermle was leading in manufacturing and advanced operations. Even after the war, Hermle was still producing high standard clocks, along with producing clocks for other companies. The overall focus at the beginning of Hermle's life was precision, multiple times in their product line they touch on the idea of precision. In the 1970 they expanded to engineering and quartz movement clocks. Hermle Clocks is a German family owned and operated company in its third generation, Rolf Hermle joined the board in 1978. Hermle manufactures mechanical mechanisms, battery operated mechanisms, accessories such as dial, pendulums, weight shells, and do-it-yourself clock kits as well as finished clocks. Hermle is a manufacturer that sells to the wholesale industry and operates in over 80 countries with offices in Germany and the United States, since 1977, as Hermle North America (changed from Hermle Black Forest clocks in January 2011).

== Hermle North America ==
The North America branch of Germany's clock manufacturing facility is known for creating the cases, known as carcasses, to house the movements that arrive from Germany. The current president of Hermle North America is Chad Eby.

After expansion in the North America region of the Hermle department, Hermle stepped into a direct retail market in 2002. Before this Hermle only sold to other clock shops and distributors. The direct retail market allowed for Hermle to have buyers purchase their clocks from home and without a middle man. Emperor was the name of the new direct retail market, still having the Hermle side of the business selling to shops while the Emperor sold directly to customers.

On 24 October 2025, Hermle Reichenbach was named the provider of trophies for Martinsville Speedway following the closure of Howard Miller, owner of Ridgeway Clocks, which had provided the trophies for NASCAR events since September 1964, when H. Clay Earles began awarding longcase clocks to feature division (Cup Series and the Late Model and Modified doubleaders) race winners, which expanded in the 2010s to all races.
