= Ridgeway Clocks =

Clock manufacturer in the United States

Ridgeway Clocks is a division of Howard Miller Company, and is a producer of longcase clocks, mantle clocks, and wall clocks. The company's facilities are located in Zeeland Michigan. According to Furniture Today magazine, Howard Miller is one of only three major manufacturers of floor clocks in the U.S.

== History ==
Ridgeway began as The Gravely Furniture Company in 1926 and started producing grandfather clocks exclusively in 1960. This makes Ridgeway the oldest continuously produced grandfather clock brand in the United States.

Pulaski Furniture Corporation acquired Gravely Furniture Company in 1985, renaming it Ridgeway Clocks, though the name "Ridgeway" appears on some clocks prior the acquisition.

Zeeland, Michigan based Howard Miller Clock Company acquired Ridgeway Clocks in November 2004 from Pulaski Furniture Corporation. Miller also owns Germany based Kieninger, which manufactures the movements that are built into each Ridgeway clock. The clock-making work moved to Zeeland in the spring of 2005.

The Ridgeway plant's production focus became curio cabinets and wine cabinets, product lines more vulnerable to import competition than grandfather and mantel clocks. In December 2007, Howard Miller Clock Co. closed its subsidiary Ridgeway Furniture, resulting in about 70 job losses.

A Ridgeway Grandfather Clock is presented to the winners of NASCAR Cup Series, NASCAR Xfinity Series and NASCAR Craftsman Truck Series races at the Martinsville Speedway. It is also presented to the winners of the ValleyStar Credit Union 300 late model stock car race.
