= Könni (family) =

Finnish clockmaker family

Könni is a Finnish clockmaker family in Ilmajoki, Ostrobothnia. The Könnis were a family of blacksmith-clockmakers from roughly the 1750s to 1865.

The first ancestor is Jaakko Jaakonpoika Ranto (1721–94), who bought the estate Könni in 1757 in the little village of Peltoniemi. His son Juho Jaakonpoika Könni (1754-1815) began making pocket-watches and clocks. He fathered Jaakko Juhonpoika Könni (1774-1830) and Juho Juhonpoika Könni (1782-1855), the clockmaker family's most outstanding performers in variety. Tower-clocks in Ekenäs, Hämeenlinna, Pori, Oulu and in Helsinki Juho Jaakonpoika Könni (1798-1865) developed the production of clocks on an industrial scale.

At the end of 18th century the Könni family could not successfully compete with German and Swiss factories.
