= Homer Calver =

American health educator (1892–1970)

Homer Northrup Calver
- Born: 1892; New York City
- Died: 1970 (age 77); New York City
- Education: Massachusetts Institute of Technology
- Known for: Work in health education
- Spouse: Elizabeth Lappe
- Children: 2 daughters
- Scientific career
- Fields: Public health Health education

Homer Northup Calver (1892 in New York City–1970 in Memorial Hospital in New York City) was an American health educator.

== Biography ==
Calver was born in 1892 in New York City, as the only son of William Louis Calver and Mary Ella Northrup. He received a degree in sanitary engineering from the Massachusetts Institute of Technology, after which he volunteered to serve in the American Ambulance Service in France during World War I. He then returned home after developing pneumonia and worked as a health administrator in Winston-Salem, North Carolina for one year (1916–17), where he helped fight diphtheria, launched a milk and food ordinance, and educated the public about health. In 1921, he began working on inventory projects for the American Public Health Association (APHA), and became the APHA's executive secretary in 1923, and held this position until he resigned in 1931. From 1925 to 1930, he was the editor of the American Journal of Public Health, and from 1925 to 1932, he was an assistant professor of hygiene at New York University School of Medicine. He founded the APHA's Scientific Exhibits Committee, and served as its head for ten years; he also became the director of the New Museum of Health when it was formed in 1937. He directed the health exhibit at the 1939 New York World's Fair, and became the director of the Bankers Federal Savings and Loan Association in 1945.

== Recognition ==
The APHA awards the Homer N. Calver Award in Calver's honor each year. The recipients of the award are distinguished experts on environmental health.
