= Finnish Museum of Horology and Jewellery Kruunu =

Museum in Finland

Coordinates: 60.1786°N 24.7942°E

The Finnish Museum of Horology and Jewellery Kruunu (Finnish: Suomen kello- ja korumuseo Kruunu, Swedish: Finlands Urmuseum) is a museum located at Ahertajantie 3 in Espoo, Finland. The museum specialises in watchmaking and jewellery. It opened in 1981, and moved to its current location in 2021.

== History ==
The collection originally belonged to the Finnish School of Watchmaking, originating in 1947, when the school was based in Lahti. The collection moved to Espoo with the school when they relocated in the 1950s. The museum itself was founded in 1981 by the Finnish Watchmaker's Association, and was initially named the Finnish Watch Museum. The new museum was located next to the watch school's buildings.

In 2006, the museum moved to WeeGee house exhibition centre, operating here until 2020. The museum moved once more in 2021, to their current location at Ahertajantie 3, and at that point, they began accepting jewellery into their collections. To reflect this, the museum changed their name to Finnish Museum of Horology and Jewellery Kruunu.

The museum welcomes around 50,000 visitors per year, displaying a collection that has been gathered over around 80 years. They hold a collection of 6,000 watches, and watchmaking tools, dating back as far as the 17th century.

As well as both temporary and permanent exhibitions, a cafe and gift shop, the museum offers a watch identification service and hands on watch making workshops.
