= WeeGee house =

Art museum building in Espoo, Finland

Coordinates: 60°10′43″N 24°47′39″E

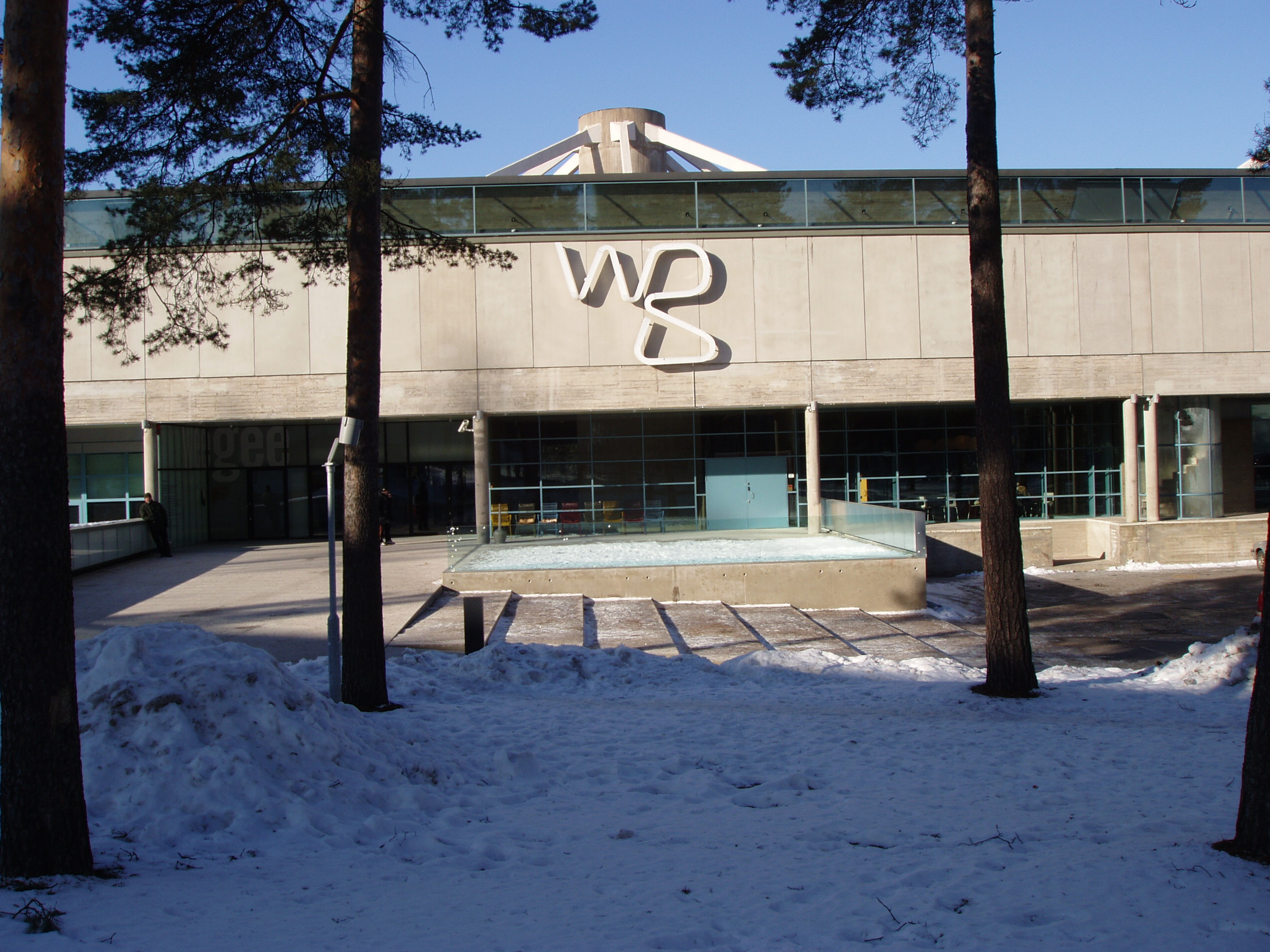
WeeGee Museum of Modern Art, Espoo, designed by Aarno Ruusuvuori, 1964

The WeeGee house (Finnish: WeeGee-talo, Swedish: WeeGee-huset), officially The WeeGee Exhibition Centre, is the former printing house of the Weilin+Göös publishing house situated on Ahertajantie in Tapiola, Espoo, Finland. The first two phases of the building were designed by architect Aarno Ruusuvuori and completed in 1964 and 1967. Nowadays, the protected building serves as the largest exhibition centre in Finland. The entirety of the exhibition centre was opened for the public in October 2006.

The WeeGee house hosts the Espoo Museum of Modern Art (EMMA), the Espoo City Museum, the Finnish Museum of Horology, the Finnish Toy Museum, The Futuro-House, Studio Suuronen and other cultural institutions. The museums share a common café and museum store. The exhibition centre is visited by 300 thousand people every year. At the other end of the building is the Etelä-Tapiola gymnasium.
