= E. Ingraham Company =

American clockmaking company

- Industry: Clock and watch manufacturing
- Founded: 1831
- Founder: Elias Ingraham
- Defunct: 1967
- Headquarters: Bristol, Connecticut

The E. Ingraham Company was one of the premier American clock and watch manufacturers during the 19th and 20th centuries. Headquartered in Bristol, Connecticut, the firm was founded in 1831 by Elias Ingraham and controlled by members of the Ingraham family until 1956.

== History ==
Elias Ingraham (1805–1885) opened his own shop in Bristol in 1831 as a cabinetmaker and designer of clock cases. While on a voyage to Caracas, Venezuela in the 1840s, Elias designed the four-column Sharp Gothic steeple clock, which was widely copied by other clock makers and sold so extensively around the world that it is believed to have been the best-seller of any distinctively American design for clocks. Elias died at his summer home on Martha’s Vineyard in August 1885. By this time, the E. Ingraham Company operated five factories and employed more than 500 people who manufactured 250,000 clocks annually.

Edward Ingraham I, the only child of Elias and his wife Julia Hale Sparks, succeeded his father as president of the E. Ingraham Company from 1885 to 1892. He was a pioneer in the American clock industry and conceived the idea of the black enameled wood cases which for years were the standard finish for high grade mantle clocks. When Edward died in 1892, his three sons assumed management of the firm: Walter A. Ingraham as president; Irving E. Ingraham as vice-president; and William S. Ingraham as secretary and treasurer. By this time, the company was engaged exclusively in the manufacture of eight-day wooden case pendulum clocks and nickel alarm clocks. In 1913 the company began producing wrist watches, followed by eight day alarm clocks in 1915.

Following Walter's retirement in 1927, management continued with William's sons Edward Ingraham II (president from 1927-1954) and Dudley Ingraham (president from 1954-1956).

During World War II, the company temporarily ceased manufacturing clocks and began producing mechanical time-fuse parts and anti-aircraft artillery for the U.S. military. For their excellence in war production, the E. Ingraham Company received the Army-Navy "E" Award.
