= John Calver =

English clockmaker (1695-1751)

- Born: 1695
- Died: 1751 (aged 55–56)
- Occupation: Clockmaker

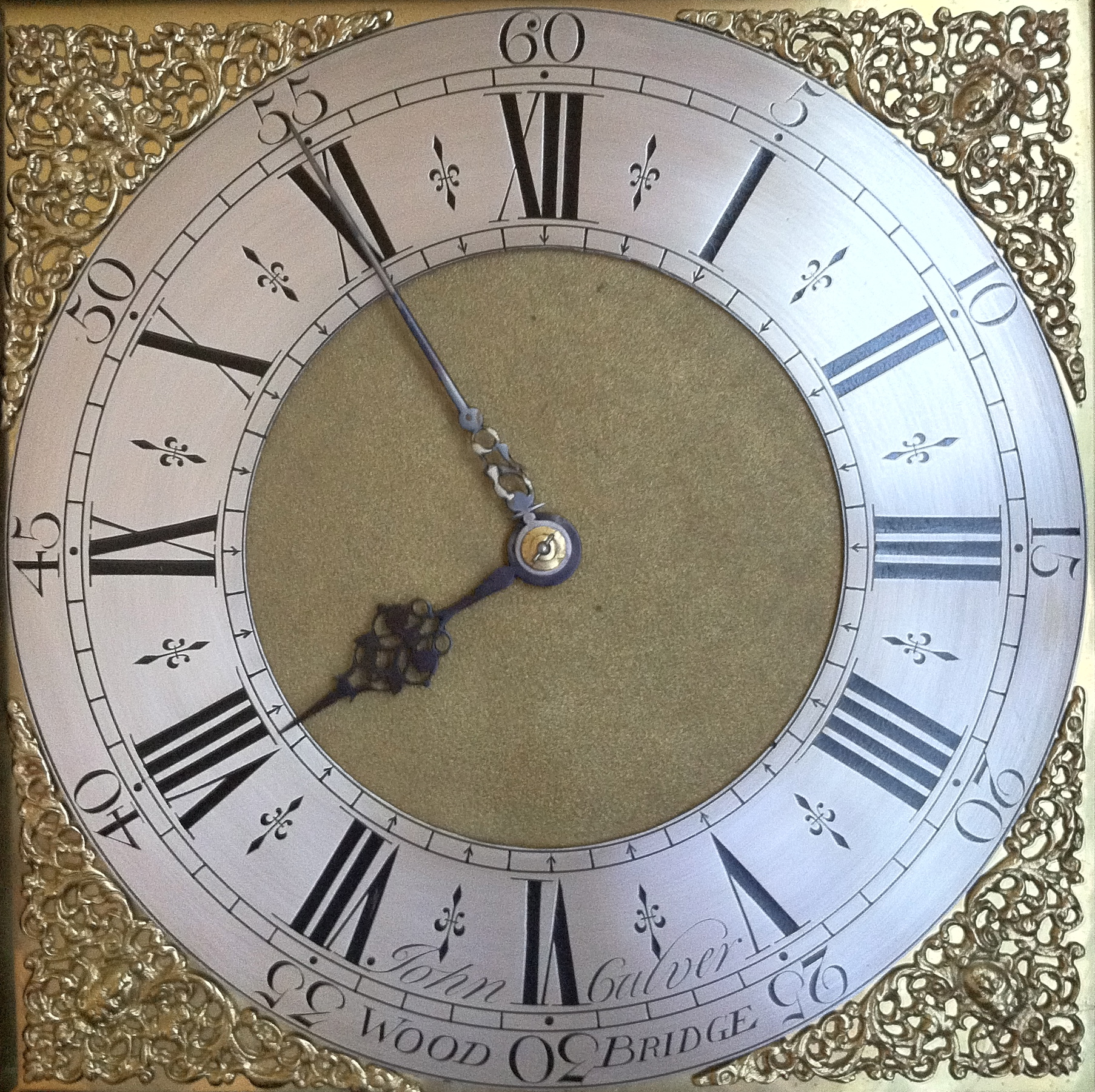
30-hour brass dial longcase clock face by John Calver

John Calver (ca. 1695 – 12 April 1751) was an English clockmaker based in Woodbridge, Suffolk.

== History ==
He was born around 1695, the son of John Calver of Wittlesham. He married Mary Trott on 3 October 1738 in St John the Baptist’s Church, Wantisden, Suffolk.

On 28 May 1718, he was apprenticed to Thomas Moore (or Moor), clockmaker, in Ipswich. He set up business in Woodbridge in Suffolk making longcase and lantern clocks, and is regarded as one of the best makers in Suffolk at this period.

In the Ipswich Journal on 24 November 1739 he is referred to as a Watch-maker.

On 5 September 1741, he took on William Mayhew as an apprentice. On the death of John Calver in 1751 his business was taken over by William Mayhew.
