= Langworthy (surname) =

Langworthy is a surname and may refer to:

- Audrey Langworthy (born 1934), American politician
- B. F. Langworthy (1822–1907), American politician
- Edward Langworthy (Founding Father) (1738–1802), delegate in the Continental Congress from the state of Georgia
- Edward Ryley Langworthy (1797–1874), British businessman and Liberal politician
- George Langworthy, American film director, producer and writer
- Helen Langworthy (1899–1991), American theater director, academic and journalist
- Isaac Pendleton Langworthy (1806–1888), American Congregational minister
- Joseph Langworthy (died 1871), American farmer and politician
- Leslie P. Langworthy (1848–1919), American architect
- Lucius H. Langworthy (1807–1865), American lead miner, banker and local politician
- Mary L. Langworthy (1872-1949), American teacher, writer, lecturer, and executive
- Nick Langworthy (born 1981), American politician
- Speed Langworthy (1901–1999), American lyricist and newspaper magnate
- T. V. John Langworthy (born 1947), American songwriter singer, composer and television personality
- William Fitzgerald Langworthy (1867–1951), Canadian politician

== See also ==
- Langworth (surname)
- Longworth (surname)
