= Intervale Street-Blue Hill Avenue Historic District =

Historic district in Massachusetts, United States

- U.S. National Register of Historic Places
- U.S. Historic district
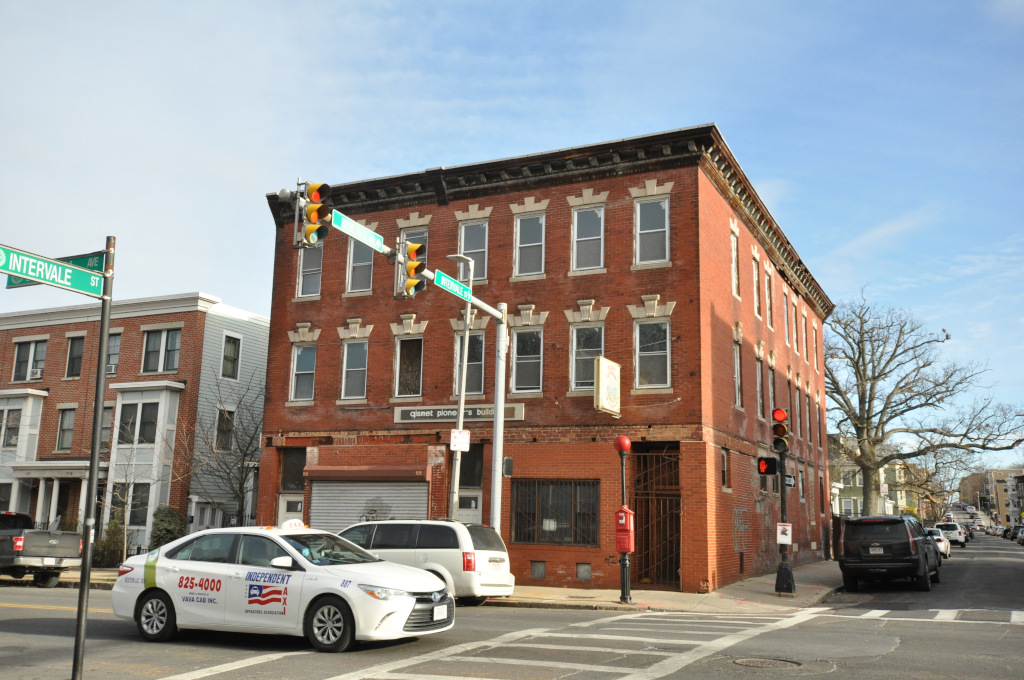

- Location within Massachusetts Location within the United States
- Location: Blue Hill Ave. and Intervale St., Boston, Massachusetts
- Coordinates: 42°18′42″N 71°4′48″W
- Area: 3 acres (1.2 ha)
- Built: 1894
- Architect: Multiple
- Architectural style: Colonial Revival; Classical Revival
- NRHP reference No.: 100005783
- Added to NRHP: November 13, 2020

The Intervale Street-Blue Hill Avenue Historic District is a historic district encompassing a densely built residential area in the Dorchester neighborhood of Boston, Massachusetts. Centered on a stretch of Intervale Street near Blue Hill Avenue, the area was developed in the late 19th and early 20th centuries during a major Jewish migration, and includes a fine sample of Colonial Revival architecture. The district was listed on the National Register of Historic Places in 2020.

== Description and history ==
Intervale Street is located in the central Dorchester area known as Grove Hall, extending roughly westward from Columbia Road toward Blue Hill Avenue. It is lined almost entirely with residential construction, particularly the stretch just east of Blue Hill Avenue which is the location of this district. The district is anchored by a mixed-use residential-commercial building at the corner of the two streets, a three-story five-bay Classical Revival brick building. Other buildings in the district are typically either brick Colonial Revival apartment houses, or wood frame single and multi-family structures, also with Colonial Revival styling. One building notable for its residents is 37 Intervale Street, which was home to Louis Farrakhan in the late 1950s. Farrakhan took over the Masjid Al-Quran mosque of the Nation of Islam, located next door at 35 Intervale Street, in 1957, taking over from its founder, Malcolm X.

The Intervale Street area had originally been developed in the 19th century with a series of wood-frame residences. Beginning about 1910, a major migration of Jews from Boston's North End and the adjacent city of Chelsea began, spurred by the extension of electrified streetcar service, and a major 1908 fire in Chelsea which left more than 15,000 Jews homeless. This area was walking distance to a synagogue built at Crawford Street in Roxbury in 1915, which became one of the major centers of Jewish life in Boston from the 1890s through the first half of the 20th century. The area suffered from urban flight and disinvestment in the 1960s and 1970s, and became the subject of urban renewal efforts in that time by the local African-American community.

== See also ==
- National Register of Historic Places listings in southern Boston, Massachusetts
