= Langworth (surname) =

Langworth is a surname, and may refer to:

- James Langworth (born 1973), Welsh cricketer
- Joe Langworth (born 1966), American theater director, singer and dancer
- John Langworth, English Anglican priest
- Richard M. Langworth (1941–2025), American author

== See also ==
- Langworthy (surname)
- Longworth (surname)
