= Humboldt Avenue Historic District =

Historic district in Massachusetts, United States

- U.S. National Register of Historic Places
- U.S. Historic district
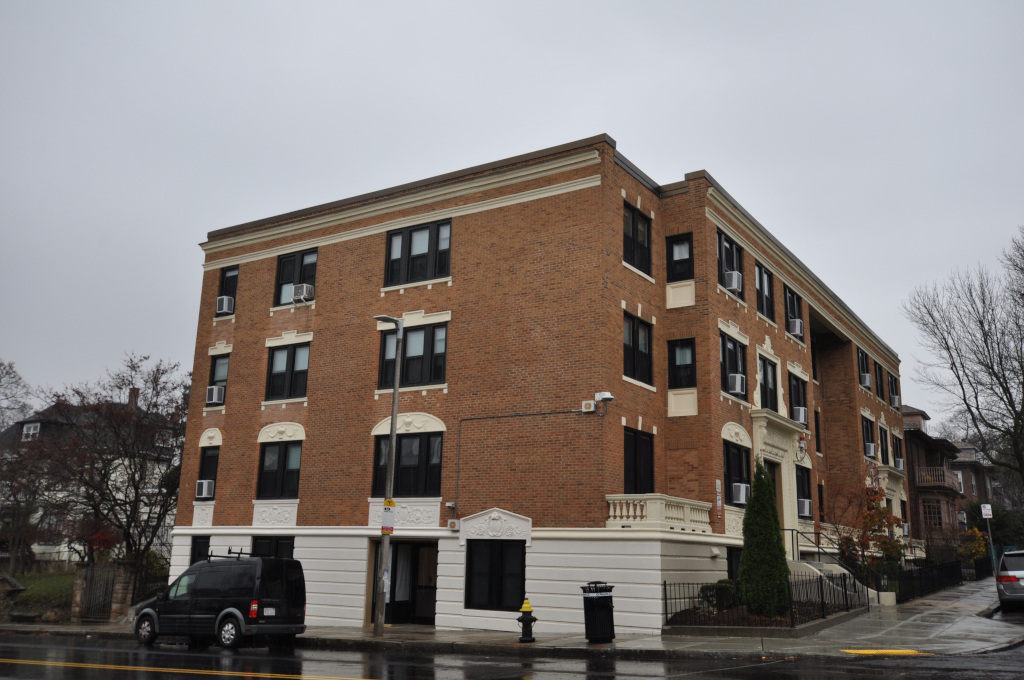

- Location within Massachusetts Location within the United States
- Location: 249, 257, 259 Humboldt Ave. and 79-83, 94 Hutchings St., Boston, Massachusetts
- Coordinates: 42°18′40″N 71°5′28″W
- Area: 3 acres (1.2 ha)
- Built: 1915
- Architect: Multiple
- Architectural style: Colonial Revival
- NRHP reference No.: 100007147
- Added to NRHP: November 22, 2021

The Humboldt Avenue Historic District is a historic district encompassing a cluster of multifamily brick buildings in the Dorchester neighborhood of Boston, Massachusetts. Centered on the junction of Humboldt Avenue and Hutchings Street, the area was developed in 1915-16 during a major Jewish migration, and includes a fine sample of Colonial Revival architecture. The district was listed on the National Register of Historic Places in 2021.

== Description and history ==
Humboldt Avenue and Hutchings Street run through a residential area northeast of Boston's Franklin Park and west of Blue Hill Avenue. The historic district includes six buildings clustered at their junction, which are differentiated from the surrounding residences by their construction. All six are multistory brick apartment houses, while the surrounding buildings are wood frame single and multifamily structures. All exhibit Colonial Revival styling, and generally feature brick walls with stone trim features; some of the buildings have a stucco finish laid over the brickwork.

The Humboldt Avenue area had originally been developed around 1900 with a series of wood-frame residences. Beginning about 1910, a major migration of Jews from Boston's North End and the adjacent city of Chelsea began, spurred by the extension of electrified streetcar service, and a major 1908 fire in Chelsea which left more than 15,000 Jews homeless. The first of the six buildings in the district to be built was 79-83 Hutchings Street, which was completed in 1915. The others were built soon after, with all six completed by then end of 1916.

== See also ==
- National Register of Historic Places listings in southern Boston, Massachusetts
