= Langworthy =

Langworthy may refer to:

== People ==
- Langworthy (surname)

== Places ==
- Langworthy, Iowa, an unincorporated community in north-central Jones County, Iowa, United States
- Langworthy, Salford, a small area of Pendleton, Greater Manchester, England
  - Langworthy (ward), an electoral ward of the Salford City Council

== Other ==
- Langworthy House, an historic octagon house in Dubuque, Iowa
- Langworthy Metrolink station, a light rail station serving Langworthy, Salford
- Langworthy Professor, an endowed chair in the School of Physics and Astronomy, University of Manchester
- Langworthy Brook, a tributary of the River Lemon in Devon, England.
