= John Longworth =

John Longworth may refer to:

- John Longworth (lawyer) (1814–1885), Canadian lawyer, judge and politician
- John Longworth (businessman) (born 1958), British business consultant and politician
