= Longworth (surname) =

Longworth is a surname. Notable people with the surname include:

- Alice Roosevelt Longworth (1884–1980), American writer, socialite, daughter of Theodore Roosevelt, and wife of Nicholas Longworth III
- Bill Longworth (rugby league) (1884–?), English rugby league footballer
- Clara Longworth de Chambrun (1873–1954), American arts patron, Shakespeare scholar, daughter of Nicholas Longworth II, and sister of Nicholas Longworth III
- Ephraim Longworth (1887–1968), English footballer
- Eric Longworth (1918–2008), British actor
- Francis Longworth Sr. (1766–1843), Irish-born Canadian businessman and politician
- Francis Longworth (1807–1883), Canadian merchant, ship builder, and politician
- Helen Longworth (born 1976), British actress
- Isabel Longworth (1881–1961), Australian dentist and peace activist
- John Longworth (businessman) (born 1958), British business consultant
- John Longworth (lawyer) (1814–1885), Canadian lawyer
- Joseph Longworth (1813–1883), American real estate magnate and philanthropist, son of the winemaker Nicholas Longworth and father of Nicholas Longworth II
- Karina Longworth (born 1980), Los Angeles-based film critic, and author
- Kate Longworth, American sports reporter
- Nicholas Longworth II (1844–1890), American lawyer and Ohio Supreme Court justice
- Nicholas Longworth III (1869–1931), American politician, son of Nicholas Longworth II
- Nicholas Longworth (winemaker) (1783–1863), Ohio banker, winemaker, and great-grandfather of Nicholas Longworth III
- Norman Longworth (born 1936), British professor in the field of lifelong learning
- Richard Longworth (academic) (died 1579), English churchman and academic; Master of St John's College, Cambridge; and Dean of Chester
- Richard Longworth (murderer) (1968–2005), American murderer
- Richard C. Longworth, American author and journalist
- Shelley Longworth (born 1976), English comedy actress and voice-over artist
- Tom Longworth (1891–1977), Anglican bishop
- William Longworth (1892–1969), Australian Olympian freestyle swimmer

== See also ==
- Longworth family
