= Benjamin Silverman Apartments =

- U.S. National Register of Historic Places
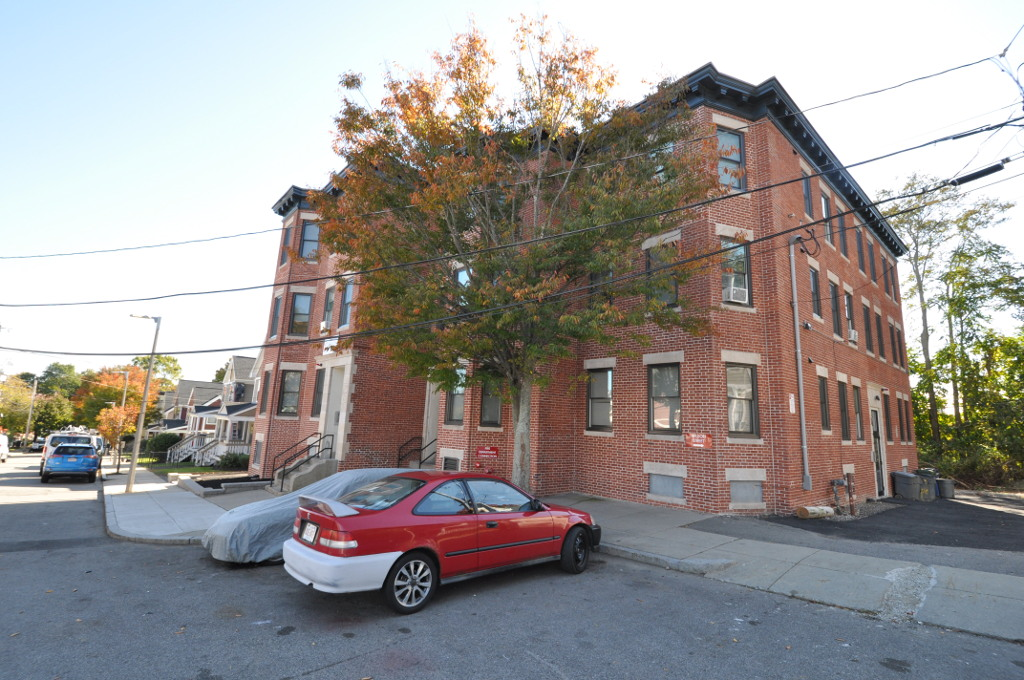

- Location within Massachusetts Location within the United States
- Location: 50-52 Lorne & 4 Wilson Sts., Boston, Massachusetts
- Coordinates: 42°17′38″N 71°5′29″W
- Area: less than one acre
- Built: 1915
- Architect: Hutch, William P.
- Architectural style: Colonial Revival
- NRHP reference No.: 100002790
- Added to NRHP: August 24, 2018

The Benjamin Silverman Apartments are a historic multifamily residential building at 50-52 Lorne Street and 4 Wilson Street in the Dorchester neighborhood of Boston, Massachusetts. Built in 1915, it is a good example of period Colonial Revival architecture, built during a major period of Jewish migration to the neighborhood. The building was listed on the National Register of Historic Places in 2018.

== Description and history ==
The Benjamin Silverman Apartments are located at the southwest corner of Lorne and Wilson Street, two residential dead-end streets off Harvard Street south of Franklin Park. It is a three-story masonry structure, built out of red brick, with wood and stone trim. Its main elevations are crowned by a projecting cornice with modillion blocks, and windows are set in rectangular openings with stone sills and lintels. The Lorne Street facade is organized similar to a pair of attached triple decker houses, one set back slightly, with mirror-image organization. Each section has two bays, one housing the entrance for that section, and the other a projecting polygonal window bay. The Wilson Street facade functions as an extension of the rightmost section, with seven bays and an entrance at their center.

The apartment house was built in 1915 to a design by William P. Hutch, with "A. Silverman" as its first owner. At the time the neighborhood in which it stood would have been built up with similar buildings; it is now the only one remaining. Its early occupants were mostly Russian Jewish immigrants, part of a second wave of Jewish migration to various Boston neighborhoods, particularly in the aftermath of the devastating Great Chelsea fire of 1908, which displaced thousands of Jews.

== See also ==
- National Register of Historic Places listings in southern Boston, Massachusetts
