= Belle Yeaton Renfrew =

American musician

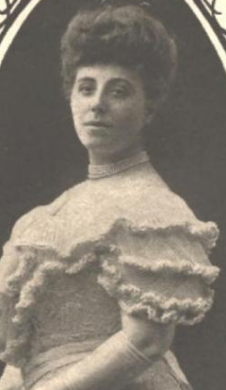
- Belle Yeaton Renfrew, from a 1908 brochure for the Bostonia Orchestra.
- Born: Augusta Belle Yeaton; December 11, 1872; Chelsea, Massachusetts
- Died: November 22, 1963; Brookline, Massachusetts
- Other names: Belle Renfrew Mahn
- Occupation(s): Musician, conductor
- Years active: 1900-1930

Belle Yeaton Renfrew (born December 11, 1872 – November 22, 1963) was an American musician, and conductor of the all-woman Bostonia Orchestra.

== Early life ==
Augusta Belle Yeaton was born in Chelsea, Massachusetts, the daughter of Charles B. Yeaton and Mary Augusta Yeaton. Her father was a Union Army veteran of the American Civil War.

== Career ==
Belle Yeaton Renfrew was conductor of the all-woman Bostonia Orchestra, which played in Boston and toured in the United States and Canada between 1904 and 1924. She also played trombone in the Bostonia Brass Quartet, with sisters Grace Mae Morse and Alice Florence Morse on first and second horns, and various women on cornet, including a third Morse sister, Ella. A reviewer in New Jersey in 1911 commented that "the conducting of Belle Yeaton Renfrew was a revelation to many who attended. She was graceful in attitude but at the same time brought out charming effects with the greatest of precision."

== Personal life ==
Belle Yeaton married jeweler William Renfrew in 1892. They lived in Watertown, Massachusetts, and had a son, Howard William Renfrew (1893-1982). By 1929 she was remarried to a fellow musician, violinist Frederick Louis Mahn. She died in 1963, aged 90 years, in Brookline, Massachusetts.
