= Chelsea, Massachusetts =

- City
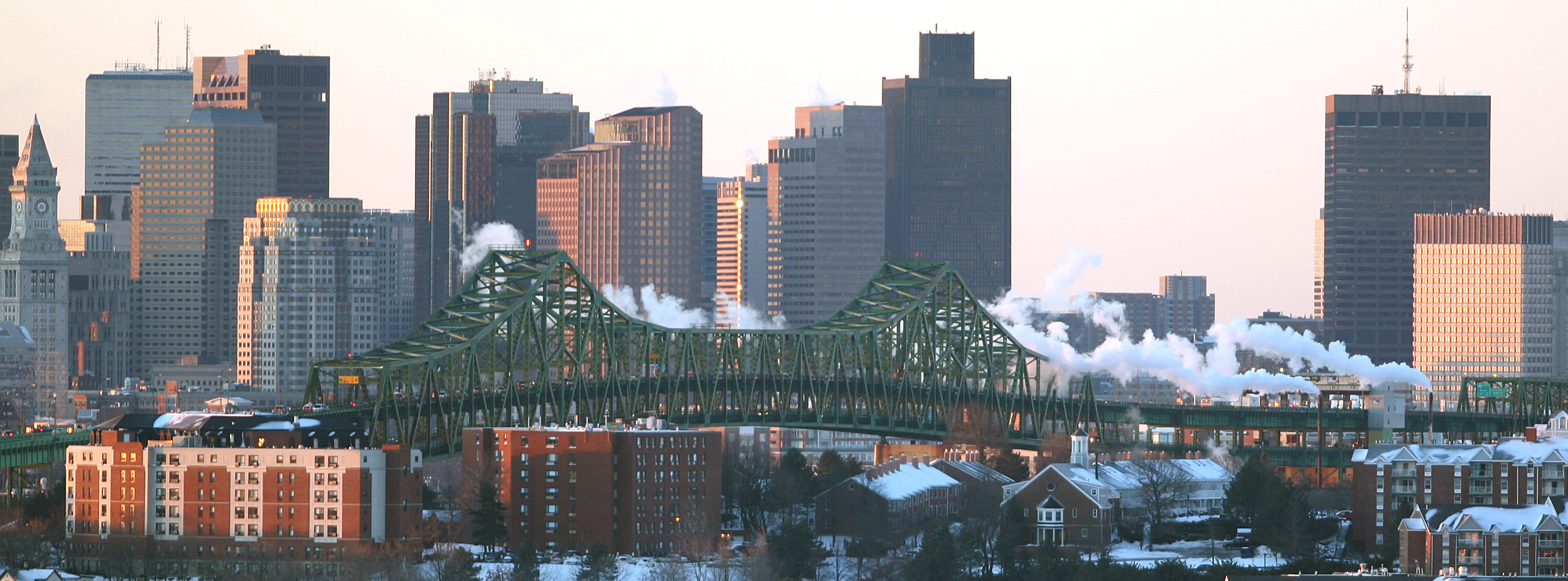
- The Tobin Bridge, linking Chelsea and Boston

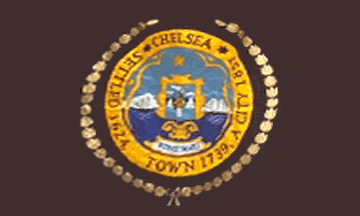
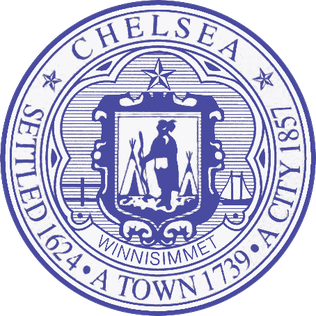
- Flag Seal

- Location in Suffolk County and the state of Massachusetts

- Location within Greater Boston area Location within Massachusetts Location within the United States
- Coordinates: 42°23′30″N 71°02′00″W
- Country: United States
- State: Massachusetts
- County: Suffolk
- Settled: 1624
- Incorporated (town): 1739
- Incorporated (city): 1857

Government
  - Type: Council–manager
  - City manager: Fidel Maltez

Area
  - Total: 2.47 sq mi (6.39 km^{2})
  - Land: 2.22 sq mi (5.75 km^{2})
  - Water: 0.25 sq mi (0.64 km^{2})
- Elevation: 9.8 ft (3 m)

Population (2020)
  - Total: 40,787
  - Density: 18,383.4/sq mi (7,097.87/km^{2})
- Time zone: UTC−5 (Eastern)
  - Summer (DST): UTC−4 (Eastern)
- ZIP Code: 02150
- Area code: 617/857
- FIPS code: 25-13205
- GNIS feature ID: 0612723
- Website: www.chelseama.gov

Chelsea is a city in Suffolk County, Massachusetts, United States. It is located along the Mystic River and connected to Boston by the Tobin Bridge. As of 2026, Chelsea has a population of 40,245 and a total area of 2.2 square miles (5.7 km^{2}). It is the smallest city in Massachusetts by land area, and the third-most-densely populated.

== History ==
=== Prehistory ===
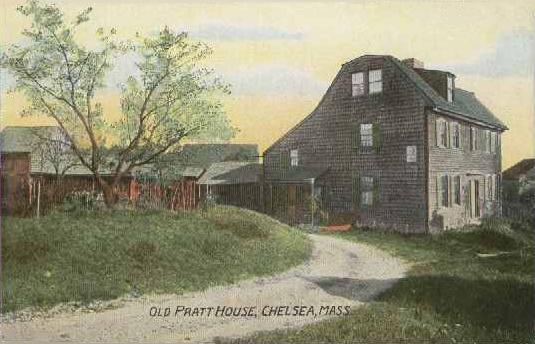
Old Pratt House in 1908

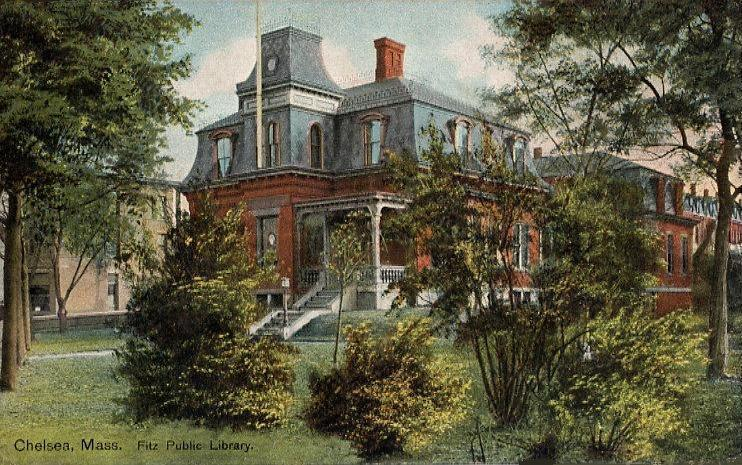
The Fitz Public Library in 1905

The area of Chelsea was first called Winnisimmet, meaning "swamp hill", by the Naumkeag tribe, which had lived there for thousands of years.

=== 17th and 18th centuries ===
Samuel Maverick became the first European to settle permanently in Winnisimmet in 1624. His palisaded trading post is considered the first permanent settlement in Boston Harbor. In 1635, Maverick sold all of Winnisimmet except for his house and farm, to Richard Bellingham. The community remained part of Boston until it was incorporated in 1739 and named after Chelsea, a neighborhood in London, England.

In 1775, the Battle of Chelsea Creek was fought in the area as the second battle of the American Revolution. During the battle, American forces captured the armed schooner Diana. Part of George Washington's army was stationed in Chelsea during the Siege of Boston.

=== 19th century ===
==== Changes to town boundaries and government ====
On 22 February 1841, part of Chelsea became part of the town of Saugus. On 19 March 1846, North Chelsea, which includes what are now Revere and Winthrop, became a separate town. Chelsea became a city in 1857.

By the middle of the 19th century, Chelsea had evolved into an industrial city and had become an essential center for the construction of wooden sailing ships.

==== Industry and local institutions ====
As steam power became more common, local industry shifted toward factory production. New factories made rubber and elastic goods, boots and shoes, stoves, and adhesives. Many of these factories were located along Boston Harbor.

The Chelsea Naval Hospital was built during this period. Designed in 1836 by Alexander Parris, it became a local landmark.

==== Jewish settlement and immigration ====
Local historical records state that Nathan Morse, the first Jewish resident of Chelsea, arrived in 1864. By 1890, the city had 82 Jewish residents.

After 1890, Chelsea became a major destination for immigrants from Russia and Eastern Europe, particularly Jewish immigrants. By 1910, the Jewish population had grown to 11,225, making up nearly one-third of the city's population.

By the 1930s, Chelsea had about 20,000 Jewish residents from a total population of nearly 46,000. Because Chelsea covers a small area, it may have had more Jewish residents per square mile than any U.S. city outside New York City.

=== 20th century ===
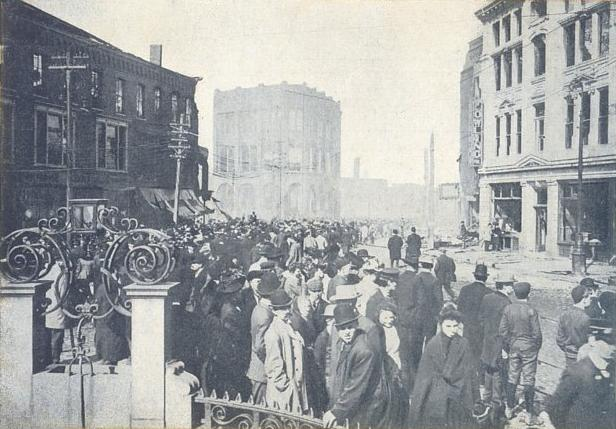
Chelsea Square after the Great Fire of 1908

==== The Great Chelsea Fire of 1908 ====
On April 12, 1908, nearly half the city was destroyed in the first Great Chelsea Fire, which left 18,000 people, 56% of the population, homeless. Many residents were taken in by those whose homes had survived, while others sought refuge in nearby Revere. The city took about two and a half years to rebuild and five years to surpass the scale of its pre-1908 infrastructure. Following the fire, the city was redesigned with wider streets and better access for emergency vehicles.

==== Population growth and industrial expansion ====
By 1919, Chelsea's population had reached 52,662, with foreign-born residents making up 46% of the total. The transition from a suburb to an industrial city saw the expansion of the local industrial sector, with shipbuilding, lumberyards, metalworks, and paint manufacturers operating along the waterfront. However, between 1940 and 1980, the population declined by 38%. Chelsea lost more residents after the 1950s due to the construction of the elevated Northeast Expressway, built to connect the North Shore suburbs to Boston via the Mystic River Bridge (later renamed for Boston Mayor Maurice J. Tobin).

==== The Second Great Chelsea Fire ====
In 1973, the Second Great Chelsea Fire destroyed 18 city blocks and affected nearly one-fifth of the city. The fire originated in Chelsea's "rag shop district", an area where streets contained many small businesses dealing in scrap materials and metal goods. Similar to the city's earlier major fire, the presence of flammable materials in this area contributed to the severity of the blaze. The fire spread rapidly through nearby areas with a high concentration of wood-frame buildings and closely spaced multifamily housing.

==== Fiscal crisis and state intervention ====
The following decades saw a decline in the city's economic and fiscal health, accompanied by a developing reputation for corruption, crime, and poverty. Chelsea's bond rating became so poor that it was unable to borrow money, forcing it to rely on state grants to stay afloat. By 1991, the city was running an estimated budget deficit around $9.5 million against an overall budget of $40 million.

==== Receivership and government reform ====
In 1991, the Massachusetts state government declined to provide further financial assistance to Chelsea. In response, then-Mayor John "Butchie" Brennan asked the state to step in. The state passed a law that placed Chelsea under receivership. Local elected officials no longer had decision-making authority, and a state-appointed official took responsibility for running the city. This was the first time since the Great Depression that a city in Massachusetts had been placed under state control.

Governor William Weld appointed James Carlin as the first receiver. Lewis "Harry" Spence later followed him. Under their leadership, 14 of the city's 17 department heads were dismissed, and steps were taken to reduce corruption within city offices. During the same period, Brennan and two former mayors were convicted of federal crimes.

The receiver appointed Susan Podziba to facilitate the development of a new city charter, a process that included public meetings and an 18-member committee tasked with drafting the document.

Voters approved the new city charter in a special election on 21 June 1994. The new charter eliminated the position of mayor, changing the city's management from a mayor–alderman to a council–manager system, where a city manager is selected by city council members.

==== Return to local control and recovery ====
In the summer of 1995, the state returned local governance to Chelsea. The receivership concluded in 1995 after the city's budget deficit was eliminated and its bond rating reached triple-A.

=== 21st century ===
In the early 2000s, Chelsea began a period of urban redevelopment. Several unused or underused areas were rebuilt as housing and mixed-use neighborhoods. One example is the Forbes Site along the Chelsea River, which was to be redeveloped into Forbes Park, covering about 17 acres (6.9 ha), including housing and small commercial spaces.

In 2018, the MBTA Silver Line was upgraded with new bus rapid transit stations, improving public transportation access in Chelsea.

== Geography ==
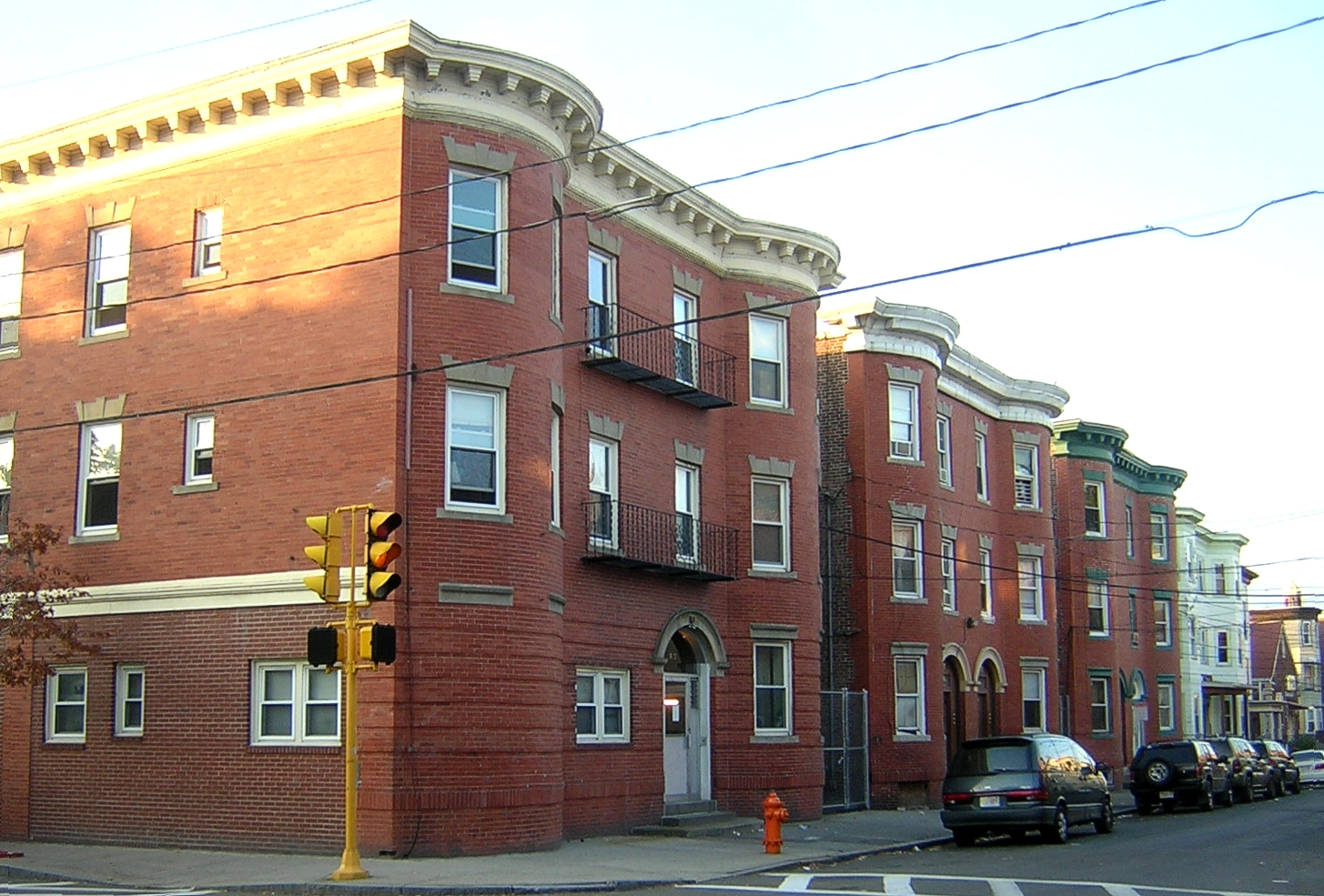
Downtown Chelsea

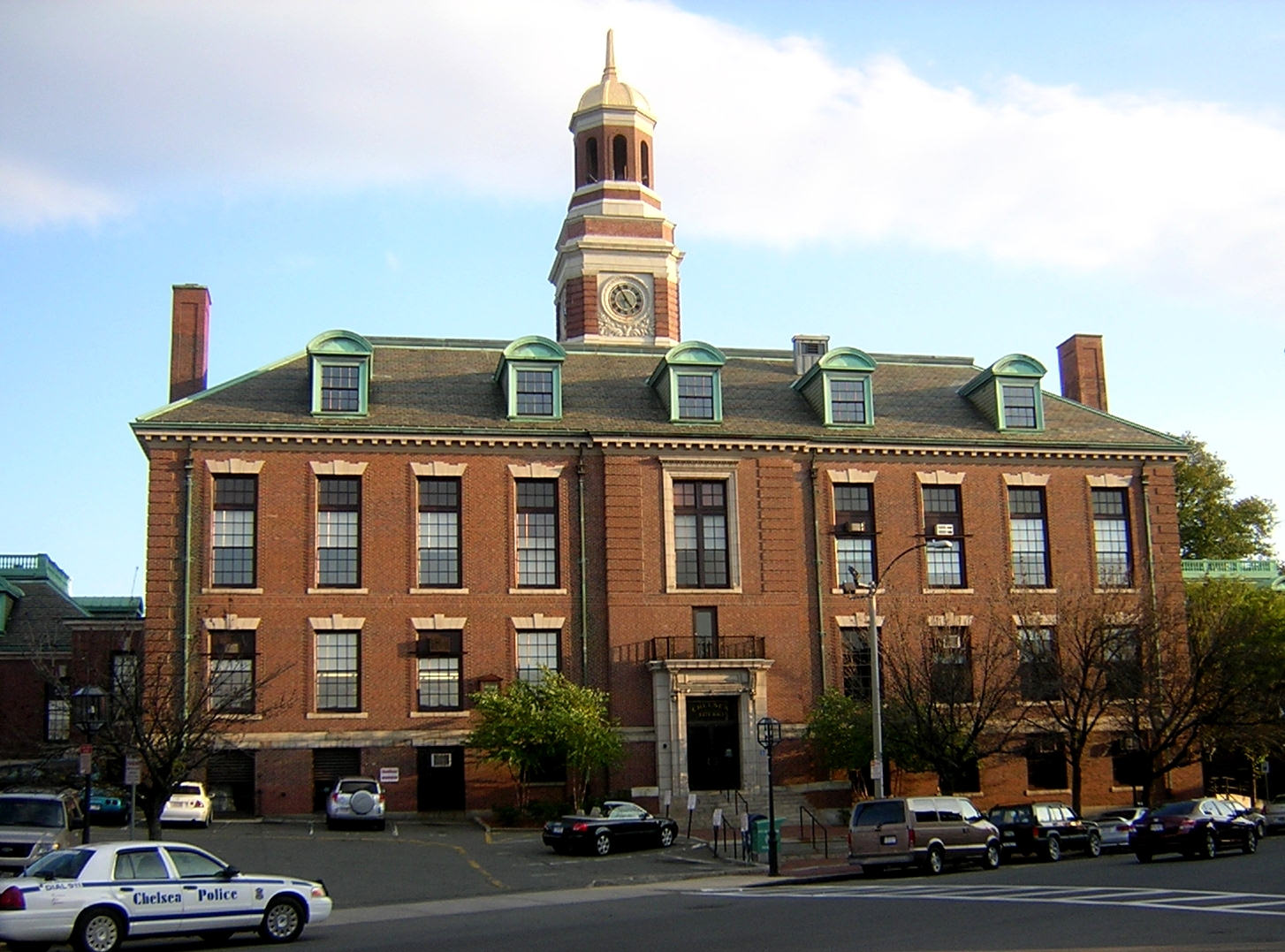
City Hall in Bellingham Square

Chelsea covers 2.21 square miles (6 km^{2}), making it the smallest city in Massachusetts by land area. It sits on a small peninsula in Boston Harbor, with water on three sides.

To the west, the Island End River separates Chelsea from Everett. To the south and east, the Mystic River and Chelsea Creek form the boundary with Boston. Along the northern edge, Mill Creek marks part of the border with Revere.

Most of the city lies low and close to sea level, but a series of small drumlins, or hills, rise in different areas. These hills, which formed long ago when glaciers shaped the landscape, are now known as Admirals Hill, Mount Bellingham, Powderhorn Hill, Mount Washington, and Mill Hill near Mill Creek. This sloped and hilly landscape helps to divide the city into discernible neighborhoods.

=== Neighborhoods and districts ===
Several distinct neighborhoods are in Chelsea:

- Admirals Hill sits atop a point of land between the Mystic River and Island End River. Containing the Naval Hospital Historic District, the area is mostly residential development. On the south slope of the hill is the site of the historic Chelsea Naval Hospital. Between the Naval Hospital and the shoreline is Mary O'Malley Park, the largest public park in Chelsea.
- Addison-Orange, adjacent to the north side of downtown, is a residential, flat, and densely populated neighborhood. Washington Avenue runs through it.
- The Bellingham Square historic district became the center of commerce and government after the 1908 fire. The design is the result of community planning after that fire. The district includes City Hall, modeled after Old Independence Hall in Philadelphia, the Public Library, and Phoenix Charter Academy's campus.
- Box District, just over a block from City Hall, gets its name from various box-manufacturing companies that operated in the area as early as 1903, when the Russell Box Company began operations at the foot of Gerrish Avenue. Abandoned in the 1960s, the area was rezoned for residential use in the 2000s.
- Carter Park—Wyndham Area, ehe neighborhood around Carter Park, is a small enclave of mostly single-family Queen Anne-style homes. Route 1 is above the southeastern edge of this tree-lined neighborhood, and Revere Beach Parkway winds along the northern edge. The Chelsea High School, Boston's FBI regional field office, MGH Healthcare Center, and Mystic Mall are located in this area. The historic Chelsea Clock Company was located in this area until 2015.
- The Chelsea Square historic district includes a waterfront district (South Broadway neighborhood). Third Street is also in the area, becoming Everett Avenue.
- Chelsea Commons, formerly known as Parkway Plaza, sits on a low, flat area near the end of Mill Creek, part of which was on a former landfill and clay pit. The plaza consists of big-box retail, fast-food restaurants, and two large apartment buildings. It is bordered by a strip of wetlands on both sides. Several notable landmarks include Webster Ave, Mill Creek Riverwalk, Creekside Common, and the Chelsea location for Beth Israel Deaconess Medical Center.
- Mill Hill, a largely residential area, consists mostly of two- and three-story, wood-frame detached buildings, covering the smallest of the city's drumlins. The Mill Hill neighborhood sits on a small neck of land bounded by Chelsea Creek and Mill Creek. This neighborhood is on the Revere line; Eastern Avenue goes through it.
- Prattville is the northwestern section of the city. It also borders Revere and Everett to the west. Washington Park and Voke Park are located in this area. A smaller Chelsea fire station is located here, as well. Garfield and Washington Avenues are in Prattville. Route 1 is on the east side of Prattville, and Route 16 is on the south side.
- The Soldiers Home neighborhood covers the steep slopes and the peak of Powderhorn Hill. This residential area contains Queen Anne-style architecture, and it is one of the least-dense neighborhoods in the city. At the peak sits the Soldiers Home, a state-run, long-term-care facility for veterans.
- The Waterfront District was established to promote water-oriented industrial uses at Forbes Industrial Park and the lower Chelsea Creek; waterfront use remains primarily industrial. Most of the waterfront from the Tobin Bridge to the mouth of Mill Creek is a designated port area.

== Demographics ==
=== Statistics ===
Historical population
Year	Pop.	±%
1790	472	—
1800	849	+79.9%
1810	594	−30.0%
1820	642	+8.1%
1830	771	+20.1%
1840	2,390	+210.0%
1850	6,701	+180.4%
1860	13,395	+99.9%
1870	18,547	+38.5%
1880	21,782	+17.4%
1890	27,909	+28.1%
1900	34,072	+22.1%
1910	32,452	−4.8%
1920	43,184	+33.1%
1930	45,816	+6.1%
1940	41,259	−9.9%
1950	38,912	−5.7%
1960	33,749	−13.3%
1970	30,625	−9.3%
1980	25,431	−17.0%
1990	28,710	+12.9%
2000	35,080	+22.2%
2010	35,177	+0.3%
2020	40,787	+15.9%
2024	40,245	−1.3%
U.S. Decennial Census

=== 2020 census ===
As of the 2020 census, Chelsea had a population of 40,787. The median age was 33.3 years; 23.9% of residents were under 18 and 10.2% were 65 or older. For every 100 females. there were 99.8 males, and for every 100 females 18 and over, there were 97.9 males age 18 and over.

All of the residents lived in urban areas, while 0.0% lived in rural areas.

Of the 13,795 households in Chelsea, 38.9% had children under 18 living in them, 33.4% were married-couple households, 23.0% were households with a male householder and no spouse or partner present, and 34.0% were households with a female householder and no spouse or partner present. About 28.0% of all households were made up of individuals, and 9.4% had someone living alone who was 65 or older.

The city had 14,554 housing units, of which 5.2% were vacant. The homeowner vacancy rate was 0.8% and the rental vacancy rate was 4.0%.

Racial composition as of the 2020 census
Race	Number	Percentage
White	11,183	27.4%
Black or African American	2,996	7.3%
American Indian and Alaska Native	576	1.4%
Asian	1,339	3.3%
Native Hawaiian and other Pacific Islander	16	0.0%
Some other race	18,189	44.6%
Two or more races	6,488	15.9%
Hispanics or Latinos (of any race)	26,826	65.8%

=== 2010 census ===
According to the 2010 United States census, 35,177 people, 11,888 households, and 7,614 families were residing in the city. The population density was 16,036.8 inhabitants per square mile (6,191.8/km^{2}), placing it among the highest in population density among U.S. cities. The 12,337 housing units had an average density of 5,639.9 per square mile (2,177.6/km^{2}). The racial makeup of the city was 47.8% White, 8.5% Black or African American, 3.1% Asian, 1.1% Native American, 0.09% Pacific Islander, 33.6% from other races, and 5.9% were multiracial. In addition, 62.1% of residents identified as Hispanic or Latino (of any race), which includes 18.2% Salvadoran, 12.7% Puerto Rican, 8.4% Honduran, 7.3% Guatemalan, 2.8% Mexican, 2.2% Dominican, 0.5% Cuban, 0.5% Costa Rican, 0.4% Nicaraguan, 0.4% Panamanian, 1.4% other Central American countries, 2.5% other South American countries, and 5.3% other Hispanic/Latino.

Of the 11,888 households, 36.4% had children under 18 living with them, 36.9% were married couples living together, 20.1% had a female householder with no husband present, and 36.0% were not families. Of all households, 28.8% were made up of individuals, and 10.8% had someone living alone who was 65 or older. The average household size was 2.87, and the average family size was 3.5.

The age distribution was 27.3% under 18, 10.6% from 18 to 24, 34.6% from 25 to 44, 16.3% from 45 to 64, and 11.2% who were 65 or older. The median age was 31 years. For every 100 females, there were 100.9 males. For every 100 females 18 and over, there were 99.7 males.

The median income in the city for a household was $30,161 and for a family was $32,130. Males had a median income of $27,280, versus $26,010 for females. The per capita income for the city was $14,628. About 20.6% of families and 23.3% of the population were below the poverty line, including 28.8% of those under 18 and 20.9% of those 65 or over.

=== Foreign-born population ===
In 2020, 46% of Chelsea residents were born outside of the United States, the highest percentage of foreign-born residents in the Commonwealth of Massachusetts. Its "Interfaith Alliance" brings members of the Jewish, Christian, and Muslim communities together to promote inclusiveness, diversity, and tolerance. The 2007 Sanctuary City Resolution aims to support all foreign-born residents.

=== Crime ===
Chelsea has been identified in several crime analyses as having one of the higher violent crime rates in Massachusetts. Estimates derived from crime datasets place violent crime levels at roughly 800 to 980 incidents per 100,000 residents, significantly exceeding both state and national averages, particularly in assault- and robbery-related offenses. However, homicide levels remain moderate rather than high, with murder rates typically at the national average. Safety rankings frequently place Chelsea among the less safe municipalities in Massachusetts and within lower safety percentiles nationally, with some analyses indicating the city is safer than only a limited share of comparable U.S. communities. Within the Greater Boston area, Chelsea is often cited as having higher violent crime rates relative to nearby cities, including Lynn, where violent crime levels are almost one-half as high despite the city's historically negative reputation regarding crime. Depending on the dataset and reporting year, Chelsea’s violent crime rate has been estimated as fluctuating around three times the national average on a per-capita basis.

== Economy ==
=== Top employers ===
According to Chelsea's 2024 Annual Comprehensive Financial Report, the top employers in the city are:

Number	Employer	Number of employees
1	City of Chelsea	1,650
2	Massachusetts Water Resources Authority	1,205
3	Massachusetts Information Technology Center	1,000
4	North Suffolk Mental Health	500-999
4	Chelsea Jewish Healthcare	500-999
4	DiMare Brother Inc.	500-999
7	Kayem Foods	250-499
7	Metropolitan Credit Union	250-499
7	Delta Management Services	250-499
7	Soldiers Home	250-499

== Arts and culture ==
Chelsea has eight places on the National Register of Historic Places.

== Government ==
=== Local ===
As of 1995, the City of Chelsea is run by a city manager and an 11-member city council. The current city manager, Fidel Maltez, was elected in 2024. The council is composed of three councilors-at-large and eight district councilors. It is currently led by president Roberto Jimenez-Rivera and vice president Norieliz DeJesus.

Voter Registration and Party Enrollment as of February 1, 2017
Party	Number of voters	Percentage
Democratic	8,370	52.24%
Republican	848	5.29%
Libertarian	19	0.12%
Unenrolled	6,597	41.18%
Total no. registered voters	16,021	100%

=== Presidential results ===
The city of Chelsea is a Democratic stronghold, having voted for every Democratic nominee for President since 1928. Before 1928, Chelsea, like many municipalities in Massachusetts, was a Republican stronghold.

Presidential election results

Chelsea, MA vote by party in presidential elections
Year	Republican	Democratic
2024	30.0% 2,539	66.6% 5,635
2020	21.0% 2,215	77.5% 8,155
2016	16.8% 1,587	79.5% 7,500
2012	18.0% 1,515	80.8% 6,802
2008	23.1% 1,820	75.2% 5,926
2004	26.1% 1,833	73.2% 5,145
2000	20.4% 1,307	73.9% 4,745
1996	16.8% 1,043	75.2% 4,676
1992	24.9% 1,957	56.2% 4,408
1988	34.2% 3,067	64.6% 5,790
1984	39.4% 3,809	60.2% 5,825
1980	33.2% 3,183	55.3% 5,292
1976	25.8% 2,824	70.6% 7,724
1972	31.1% 3,507	68.2% 7,681
1968	12.2% 1,500	83.6% 10,252
1964	8.7% 1,193	90.9% 12,465
1960	19.3% 2,989	80.4% 12,477
1956	32.9% 5,342	66.9% 10,875
1952	28.9% 5,322	70.5% 12,986
1948	16.8% 2,875	76.5% 13,048
1944	20.4% 3,245	79.4% 12,061
1940	19.7% 3,234	76.5% 13,025
1936	18.5% 2,725	75.6% 11,113
1932	26.4% 3,129	67.9% 8,061
1928	33.1% 3,908	64.7% 7,631
1924	49.9% 4,271	25.4% 2,169
1920	62.5% 4,539	27.6% 2,008
1916	44.1% 2,091	50.4% 2,390
1912	30.0% 1,302	34.3% 1,485
1908	58.9% 2,496	33.4% 1,417
1904	61.3% 3,242	33.2% 1,757
1900	60.1% 2,961	34.6% 1,704
1896	73.7% 3,808	23.4% 1,207
1892	58.2% 2,883	39.3% 1,948
1888	62.4% 2,721	35.3% 1,538
1884	52.0% 2,110	41.3% 1,677
1880	65.9% 2,456	33.4% 1,246
1876	64.3% 2,184	35.7% 1,215
1872	73.9% 1,907	26.1% 674
1868	75.7% 1,797	24.3% 577

== Education ==
Chelsea Public Schools has four elementary schools, three middle schools, and one high school, Chelsea High School. The Chelsea school system has historically been towards the bottom of the state's test score rankings. It has a high turnover among students. A high percentage of students move in or out over the course of the year, and the dropout rate is high. In 1988, the school board delegated its authority for control of the school district to Boston University. In June 2008, the partnership with BU ended, and the schools returned to complete local control. Chelsea has no private schools remaining, with St. Rose of Lima closing in June 2020. In addition, there are two public charter schools, the Excel Academy and Phoenix Charter Academy. Bunker Hill Community College has a satellite location of their school in Chelsea.

== Infrastructure ==
=== Transportation ===
==== Roads ====
The Route 1 North Expressway is a limited-access highway that cuts the City of Chelsea in half. The Tobin Bridge, a major regional transportation artery, carries Route 1 from Chelsea across the Mystic River to Charlestown.

==== Train ====
Chelsea is served by the Massachusetts Bay Transit Authority's Commuter Rail. The Commuter Rail provides service from Boston's North Station to the Chelsea station on its Newburyport/Rockport Line. Some MBTA Bus routes have a link to subway transit systems, including 111, 112, 114, 116, and 104.

==== Bus ====
Chelsea is served by many MBTA bus routes providing local service to East Boston, Revere, Everett, and other nearby cities, as well as bus rapid transit connections to Logan Airport and downtown Boston via the MBTA's Silver Line.

The Silver Line's SL3 route to Chelsea has been in operation since 2018. The new SL3 route begins at South Station and runs through the Waterfront Tunnel, along with the SL1 and SL2 routes, to Silver Line Way, continuing with the SL1 through the Ted Williams Tunnel. The new route diverges to meet the Blue Line at Airport Station, and follows the Coughlin Bypass Road (a half-mile commercial-use-only road that opened in 2012) to the Chelsea Street Bridge. The Silver Line stops at the four stations in Chelsea: Eastern Avenue, Box District, Downtown Chelsea, and Mystic Mall. A new $20 million Chelsea commuter rail station and "transit hub" was constructed at the Mystic Mall terminus of the new Silver Line route, so that trains no longer block Sixth Street. The new Silver Line and commuter rail stations are fully handicapped accessible.

Additionally, a multiuse, 0.75-mile (1.21 km) shared path 0.75-mile (1.21 km) linear park runs parallel to the Silver Line bus rapid transit busway, using the Boston & Albany Railroad's Grand Junction Branch right-of-way. Located within the Box District neighborhood, the path connects the Downtown Chelsea and Eastern Avenue stations.

=== Fire department ===
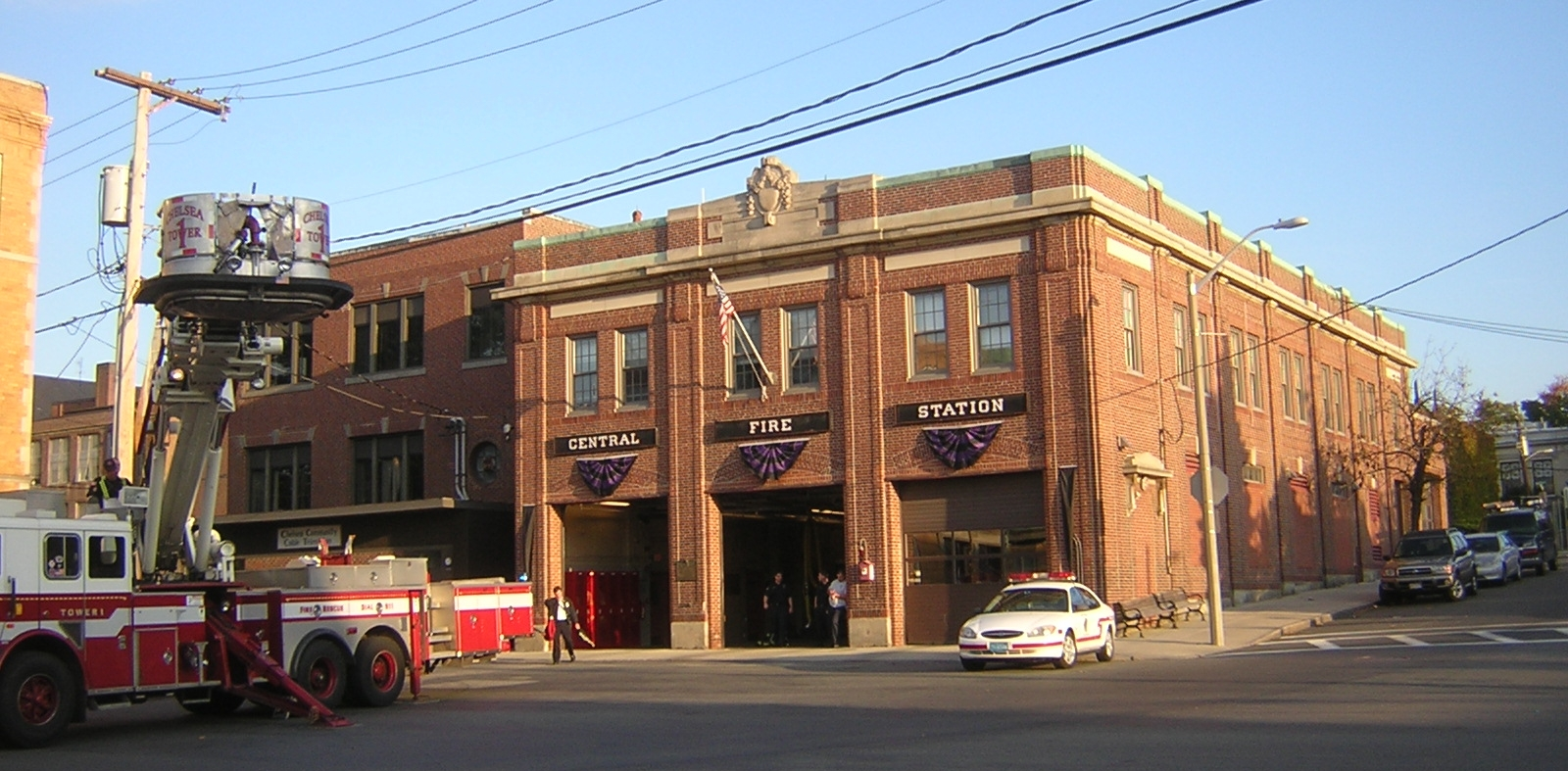
Chelsea Fire Headquarters

The Chelsea Fire Department operates from three fire stations across the city. The fire department operates a fleet of four engines, two ladders, two special operations units, a maintenance unit, a foam-tender unit, and several other special, support, and reserve units. They respond to about 11,000 emergency calls annually. The Chief of the Department is John Quatieri, who was sworn in on March 8, 2024.

Emergency Medical Services are contracted to private ambulance provider Cataldo Ambulance Service, which has serviced the city since 1982.

== Notable people ==
- Horatio Alger, author
- Miguel La Fay Bardi, Roman Catholic Prelate of the Territorial Prelature of Sicuani (1999–2013)
- Richard Bellingham, governor of the Massachusetts Bay Colony
- Tom Birmingham, former President of the Massachusetts Senate
- Selma Botman, President of the University of Southern Maine
- Ian Bremmer, political scientist and founder of Eurasia Group
- Alfred Winsor Brown, 31st Naval Governor of Guam
- William Bryden, U.S. Army major general
- Vannevar Bush, Raytheon Company Co-founder
- Chick Corea, jazz musician
- Norman Cota, United States Army general
- Albert DeSalvo, Boston Strangler
- Win Elliot, sportscaster and game show host
- Anna Christy Fall (1855–1930), lawyer
- David Sidney Feingold, biochemist, born in Chelsea in 1922
- Adeline Frances Fitz, composer and DAR president
- Jack Harvey, member of the Wisconsin State Assembly
- Ray Hyman, Professor Emeritus of Psychology at the University of Oregon, author, magician, and a noted critic of parapsychology
- Glenn Ivey, U.S. representative for Maryland
- Brian Kelly, LSU Tigers head football coach
- Isaac Pendleton Langworthy, American Congregational minister and librarian
- Lewis Howard Latimer, scientist and inventor
- Samuel Maverick, colonist
- Howard B. Meek, educator at Cornell University
- Charles E. Mitchell, banker
- Jim Mutrie, baseball pioneer
- Joseph C. O'Mahoney, United States Senator from Wyoming
- Marion Osgood, violinist, orchestra leader, composer
- Daniel Pratt, author and eccentric
- Belle Yeaton Renfrew, trombonist and conductor
- Harris S. Richardson, former President of the Massachusetts Senate
- Annette Rogers, sprinter and Olympic gold medalist
- John Ruiz, heavyweight boxing champion
- Joe Smith, music industry executive
- Arnold Stang, actor, known for films such as The Man with the Golden Arm and It's a Mad, Mad, Mad, Mad World
- Elizabeth Cady Stanton, American social activist, abolitionist, and leading figure of the early women's rights movement
- Michelle Tea, author, poet, and literary arts organizer, co-founder of lesbian-feminist performance art collective based in San Francisco
- Carl Voss, National Hockey League Hall of Famer
- Wenepoykin, last sachem of the Naumkeag people
- Maury Winetrobe, film and music editor
- John Raimondi, renowned American sculptor and art collector.

== See also ==
- List of mayors of Chelsea, Massachusetts
