= Adeline Frances Fitz =

American composer

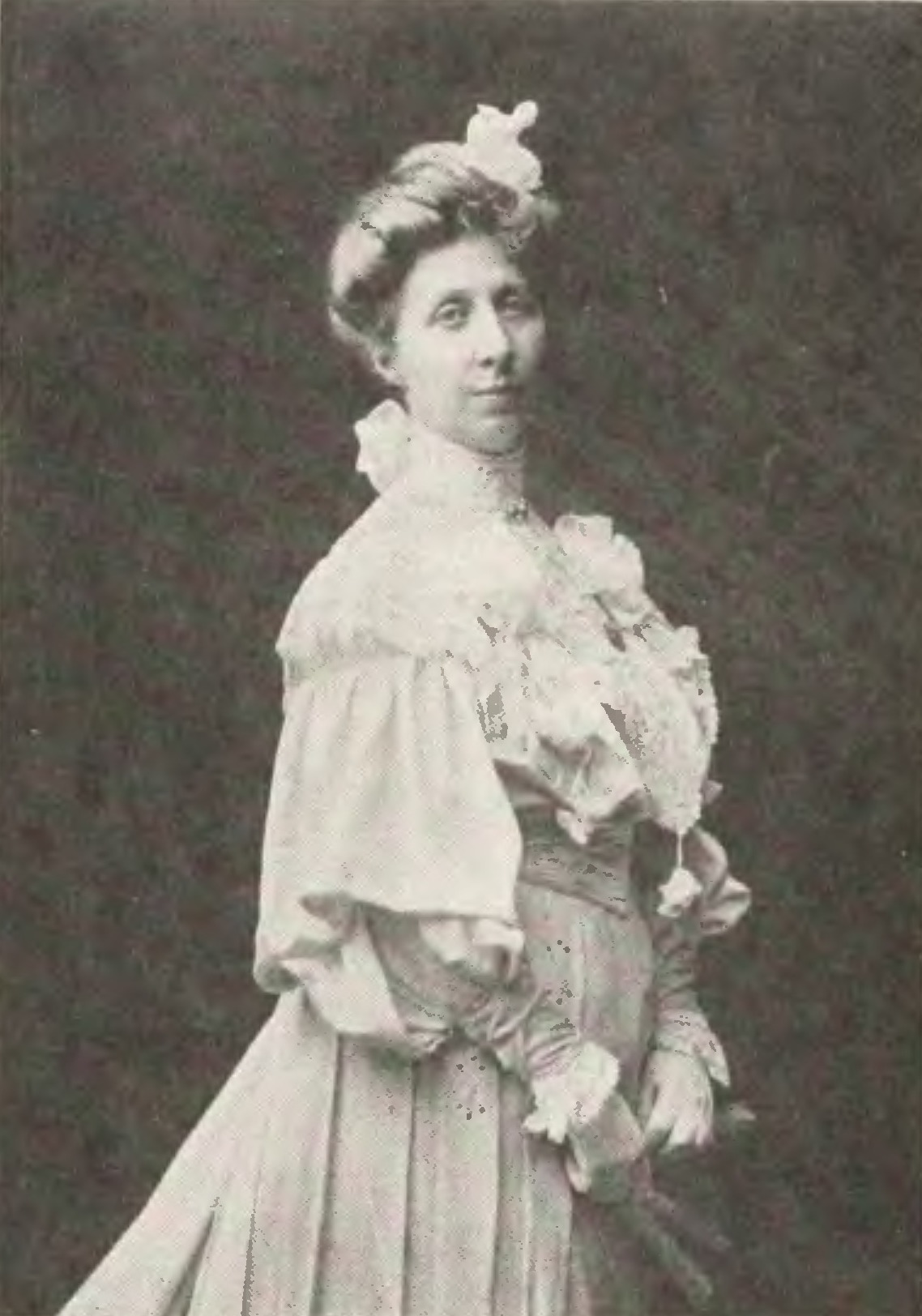
- Adeline F. Fitz, from a 1904 publication
- Born: Adeline Frances Slade; July 12, 1861; Chelsea, Massachusetts, U.S.
- Died: March 7, 1938 (aged 76); Melrose, Massachusetts, U.S.
- Other names: Fanny Slade Fitz
- Occupations: Composer, clubwoman
- Known for: Massachusetts president, Daughters of the American Revolution (1909–1912)

Adeline Frances "Fanny" Slade Fitz (July 12, 1861 – March 7, 1938) was an American composer and clubwoman, based in Boston. She was state president of the Daughters of the American Revolution (DAR), and also held national office in the organization.

== Early life and education ==
Slade was born in Chelsea, Massachusetts, the daughter of David Slade and Elizabeth Wilson Whitaker Slade. Her father was a spice importer; her mother was born in England. She was a student at Carolyn Johnson's School for Girls in Boston. She also studied voice with Mrs. L. P. Morrill.

== Career ==
Fitz was Massachusetts state regent of the Daughters of the American Revolution, and held national offices in the organization as well. She traveled the United States lecturing as a prominent DAR leader. She was also a founding member of the Society for the Preservation of New England Antiquities, and a member of the Chelsea Woman's Club, the Professional Woman's Club, and the Society of Colonial Dames. She was one of the directors of her father's company, D. & L. Slade.

== Compositions ==
Slade wrote music and songs for school and community use, including children's songs, patriotic songs, and hymns. She published an article, "Music of our Forefathers", in The New England Magazine (1908).

- "The Sweetest Flower that Blows" (lyrics by Frederick Peterson)
- "The Dandelion and the Daisy"
- "The Shepherd's Lullaby"
- "My Little Sweetheart" (1901)
- "The Siren of Old"
- "America, Columbia" (official song of the Massachusetts DAR)
- "Alouette"
- "Sailing Away to Slumberland" (lyrics by Grace Lawrence)
- "Christ the Lord is Risen Today" (lyrics by Frank E. Fitz)

== Personal life ==
Slade married lawyer Frank Eustace Fitz in 1884. They had sons David, Eustace, and Robert. They wintered in Inverness, Florida. Her husband died in 1913, and she died in 1938, at the age of 76, at a hospital in Melrose, Massachusetts.
