= Chelsea Clock Company =

American clock manufacturing company

Coordinates: 42°23′58.2″N 71°2′27.8″W

- Formerly: Harvard Clock Company; Boston Clock Company; Eastman Clock Company
- Founded: July 23, 1897; 129 years ago
- Founder: Charles Pearson
- Headquarters: Chelsea, Massachusetts, United States
- Website: www.chelseaclock.com

The Chelsea Clock Company is an American clock manufacturing company founded in 1897. Clocks produced by Chelsea Clock Company have been found in the White House, on US Naval Ships, and in homes and offices around the world. The company continues to build and repair clocks at their corporate headquarters in Chelsea, Massachusetts.

== History ==
=== Before Chelsea Clock (1800s) ===
Prior to 1880, Joseph Henry Eastman served as an apprentice watchmaker to Edward Howard, founder of E. Howard & Co. After serving his apprenticeship, Eastman would become one of the founders of Harvard Clock Company, which was granted a Massachusetts’ Certificate of Organization on November 20, 1880, starting as co-director alongside James H. Gerry. In the 1881 Boston City Directory however, Eastman was titled as General Manager. During this time, Harvard Clock Company produced 800 clocks of marine, carriage, banjo, and shelf types. The Harvard Clock Company would change its name to Boston Clock Company in 1884..

Boston Clock Company continued to produce clocks like they did when they were Harvard Clock Company. However, in 1886, they began producing striking clocks after the invention of the Boston tandem wind movement. They also began to produce ship's bell clocks, although they were limited and appear to be prototypes. Circumstantial evidence shows these ship's bell marked with “Boston Clock Co.” were assembled at the Vermont Clock Company circa 1900. Boston Clock Company produced approximately 150,000 clocks between 1884 and 1894. On January 31, 1894, the Jewelers’ Circular of Horological Review reported that the Ansonia Clock Company bought out the Boston Clock Company. On September 4, 1895, The Circular reported that the Boston Clock Company was transferred to Charles O. Warner on private terms. According to the report, the estate consisted of a large brick building and lots of land containing about 50,362 square feet, appraised for $5,000. The whole was assessed for $35,000. The Ansonia Clock Company continued to offer Boston Clock Company clocks in their catalogue until late 1907.

From 1894 to 1896, Joseph H. Eastman constructed a factory in Chelsea, Massachusetts, calling the new company Eastman Clock Company. Once completed, the Eastman Clock Company produced limited numbers of marine, regulator, and banjo clocks. However, shortly after the completion of the factory, Joseph Henry Eastman fell into bankruptcy. On May 1, 1896, a mechanic's lien was recorded in Land Court against Eastman by J.E. Gidden in the amount of $3,559.72. Another lien of $700 was recorded in Land Court by Joseph A. Ingalls on July 25, 1896. Eastman Clock Company was foreclosed and sold in mid 1896. Joseph Eastman retained movements marked Eastman Clock Co. after the foreclosure which was later sold to Fairhaven Manufacturing Company (later called Vermont Clock Company in 1898) in Fairhaven, Vermont.

On October 7, 1896, Harry W Bates, with a small group of investors formed a clock company called Boston Clock Company of Maine in Kittery, Maine. This was done to succeed the defunct firm of the same name. Shortly after on October 29, 1896, the Boston Clock Company of Maine would purchase the foreclosed property for $6,300. However, by using the name Boston Clock Company as well as Eastman's factory and clock design, it led to confusion as to the origin of the “Chelsea” Clock Company.

In 1897, Charles Pearson, a native Bostonian, acquired the property, tools, and machinery and, within days, began operating it as the Chelsea Clock Company. The tools and machinery however were jury-rigged and badly worn. Due to this, he set about expanding Chelsea's workforce and investing in major plant and equipment improvements. The first meeting of the Chelsea Clock Company Board of Directors occurred on July 28, 1897. On the board were Whipple N. Potter - President, Charles H. Pearson - Treasurer, Reginald Foster - Clerk and Allen L. Shepherd - Secretary.

=== The early years ===
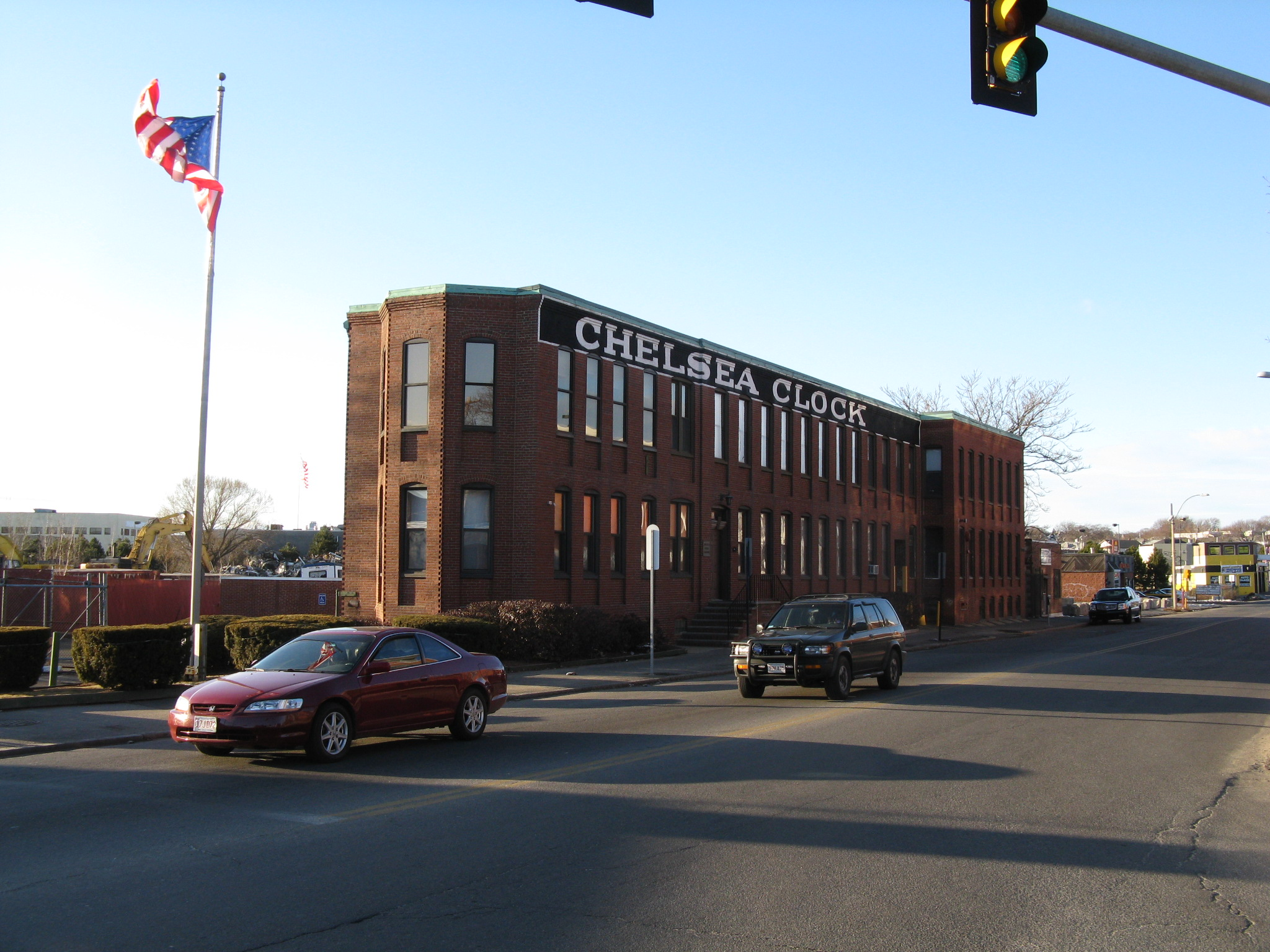
Chelsea Clock Company (1897 - 2015)

Early production centered on pendulum models and brass-plated, non-striking marine clocks. Pendulum clocks, with their fine mahogany cabinets, often took months to produce. The company produced its marine clocks entirely in-house, so these created revenue far more quickly.

Under Pearson's guidance, Chelsea made numerous product design improvements, many of which it patented. These included the design for a ship's bell clock having a fully encased chime and striking mechanism, patented in 1900. By 1903, the company also produced clocks for automobiles, soon counting Rolls-Royce, Packard, and Studebaker among its customers. It wasn't until 1906, however, that the company earned its first profit. The United States Navy was by then ordering Chelsea's marine clocks in increasing quantities, leading other military branches to follow their lead. In 1907 and 1908, the U.S. Treasury Department ordered more than 100 clocks for its offices throughout the country. This motivated Pearson to establish the Boston Clock Company, essentially a separate brand for clocks and related instruments—including an artillery time fuse—the company manufactured to meet government standards.

From 1906 until the late 1920s, Chelsea's business grew profitably under Pearson's guidance. In 1928, however, he died following a brief illness. He wanted William Neagle, who he had hired 26 years earlier, to have first option on buying the company, which Neagle soon did.

=== The mid 1900s ===
Neagle was quick to replace less popular models with new ones, including the Forecaster, Fulton, and Georgian. Shortly after he assumed ownership, however, the stock market crashed and the Great Depression set in. Through drastic inventory and cost reductions Neagle managed to keep Chelsea afloat. When World War II arrived, Chelsea's role as a government supplier helped offset declining consumer sales. Neagle retired in 1945, selling the company to longtime employees George King and Walter Mutz.

In postwar 1946, the United States Air Force created its Strategic Air Command (SAC) and equipped each if its bombers and nuclear missile silos with Chelsea clocks. Meanwhile, Mutz noted a growing demand for electric clocks and, in 1947, introduced Chelsea's Model VE. He also introduced consumer versions of its popular military clocks, the Type "A" (12-hour) and Type "B" (24-hour). Mutz and King eventually discontinued several models, including the Athena, Fulton, and Magellan, while adding others, among them Bookends, Comet, and Corvette. James Leone, Chelsea's director of engineering, also introduced several improvements to the company's Ship's Bell model, including the addition of a stop strike lever. The redesigned movement, called the Model 4L, remains largely the same to this day.

=== The late 1900s ===
In 1970, Mutz and King sold Chelsea Clock to Automation Industries, where Chelsea became part of the marine division. Soon thereafter, Chelsea's management noted the growing popularity of less expensive European movements, leading it to introduce a line of mid-priced clocks with German-made Hermle movements. To distinguish them from its premium clocks, Chelsea introduced its Boston Ship's Strike brand. In 1972, just two years after acquiring Chelsea Clock, Automation sold it to Bunker Ramo Corporation who, among many things, was the nation's largest producer of automotive clocks. In 1975, Chelsea began marketing its Ship's Bell and house strike (12-hour chime) movements with pendulum escapements in the popular banjo style. That same year, it also designed and introduced its first tide clock.

Bunker Ramo sold Chelsea in 1978 to Richard Leavitt, a native Bostonian, avid sailor, and former corporate auditor. Leavitt soon realized Chelsea could no longer rely largely on its government, marine, and Ship's Bell sales, so he revitalized its jewelry house line, introducing ten new clock models in 1981. He also resumed efforts to reserve the Chelsea brand name for the company's premium timepieces, and use the Boston brand for mid-line products—a practice he abandoned ten years later. By 1984, quartz and digital timekeeping technology were well established, leading Chelsea to introduce its Chronoquartz clock, named for its chronometer-like accuracy.

=== 2000s ===
In 2005, after leading Chelsea Clock for more than 25 years, Leavitt sold the company to JK Nicholas, an investor in Boston Scientific and a business consultant, entrepreneur, and longtime collector of Chelsea clocks. When Leavitt sold the company to Nicholas, he sold only the company. The old building which had been the company's home was sold to a real estate developer who owned a number of old and dilapidated properties. In 2015, Chelsea Clock moved out, remaining in Chelsea, Massachusetts and making way for the old building to be demolished so the site can become part of an urban renewal project which will include mixed use of retail, commercial and residential units. Much of Chelsea's production today follows the 18th Century model of "cottage industry" in which pieces are made in various locations and brought together under the main company roof for final assembly, so less space was needed to house the company workshops and offices.
