= Great Chelsea fire of 1973 =

Fire in Chelsea, Massachusetts, United States

Coordinates: 42°23′47.33″N 71°2′32.23″W

- The second Great Chelsea fire destroying 18 city blocks—note the fire hoses running down the center of the street.
- Date: October 14, 1973
- Time: 3:56 p.m. (ET)
- Location: Chelsea, Massachusetts, USA
- Also known as: Second Great Chelsea fire
- Type: Fire
- Cause: Undetermined
- Deaths: 0
- Property damage: 300 buildings burned down
- Displaced: 1,100

The Great Chelsea fire of 1973, also known as the second Great Chelsea fire, was a conflagration that occurred on October 14, 1973, in Chelsea, Massachusetts, a city directly across the Chelsea Creek from East Boston. The fire burned 18 acres (7.3 ha), and was spread by strong winds and a lack of adequate water supply in the neighborhood of the fire. The fire started 200 yards (180 m) away from the origin of the Great Chelsea fire of 1908.

== Chronology ==
The fire broke out in the "Rag Shop" District, made up of wood structured buildings and machine shops. By the time the first alarm had been raised at 3:56 p.m., the fire was well developed and by 4:01 p.m. it had jumped the street, rapidly engulfing six buildings that lay in its path. High winds made it impossible for the firefighters on scene to contain the fire as it grew in size to around two city blocks. Many fire engines and crews were forced to retreat at this time to avoid becoming trapped.

A new defense position was aimed to take place at the corner of Maple and Summer Street, but the rapidly expanding fire soon overtook that position. At 4:12 p.m. it had jumped Maple Street and at 4:15 p.m. it had leaped another two blocks which forced firefighters back in another retreat. Around this time, Chief Herbert C. Fothergill requested mutual aid from all surrounding areas. At 4:20 p.m., 24 minutes after the first alarm had been sounded, Chief Fothergill notified Chelsea Command that a conflagration was in progress. At 4:30 p.m., the fire was raging out of control and now encompassed five blocks. A new strategic firefighting defensive position was set up on Everett Avenue, the only street in the area wide enough to act as a firebreak. Strong winds again prevented water from getting to the flames. Before a proper defense was set up, however, the fire leaped 150 feet (46 m) over their heads and ignited the Emerald Autoworks facility.

Due to the fire's rapid size and growth, Chief Fothergill boarded a helicopter to direct operations from the sky. After crossing Vale Street, every one of its buildings was engulfed in 12 minutes. To avoid being trapped, firefighters from Medford, having responded through mutual aid, were forced to abandon one of their engines. A system of hoses and feeder lines from as far as one mile (1.6 km) away were set up to relay water to the main lines as the water supply was inadequate from the start. At 5:30 p.m., the fire had surrounded the Engine 5 Fire Station, and even though there was not a single firefighting apparatus available to them, the firefighters refused to abandon the station.

Heated columns of air rose hundreds of feet high creating massive amounts of fresh air the fire needed to sustain itself, which were drawn in at ground level and creating winds that at times reached 100 mph (160 km/h), drove heavy debris through the streets, and endangered the safety of firefighters and the public. Carried by that wind, embers fell behind the backs of firefighters creating brush and spot fires. Soon, the radiating heat of the area had preheated buildings hundreds of feet from the fire until they reached ignition temperatures and spontaneously exploded. Lacking a common radio frequency, the mutual aid fire companies were initially unable to get communications from Chelsea Command. In order to fix this issue, those in critical sections of the fire were given portable radios on the Chelsea Fire Command frequency and relayed the information and instructions to their individual companies.

In 120 minutes, the fire engulfed 18 city blocks, and the firefighters were successfully able to mount a defense in front of the Williams School. From the helicopter, Chief Fothergill ordered that an all out stand must be made from the school at 6:30 p.m., as it was their last chance to stop the fire. Deputy Chief William J. Capistran Jr. set up a heavy line and apparatus outside the school and firefighters with hand-lines manned the roof. Mobile teams of firemen operated behind the school to extinguish spot fires.

Within five hours, 1,200 firefighters and 111 fire departments had responded to the call for assistance. Even once the fire was successfully contained, many worked throughout the night to put out the spot fires throughout the city. It was three days before the fire was finally fully extinguished.

== Impact ==
On October 15, 1973, Governor of Massachusetts Francis Sargent wrote a letter to President Richard Nixon saying: "Dear Mr. President, I am requesting that the City of Chelsea immediately be declared a federal disaster area. The city of Chelsea was swept by a fire yesterday which consumed 18 city blocks including 200 buildings. Over 1,100 people have been left homeless and 600 left jobless by this disaster. Emergency federal assistance is urgently needed."

Later calculations revealed that over 300 buildings had burned down.
