= Francis Longworth Sr. =

Canadian politician

Francis Longworth (1766 – February 27, 1843) was an Irish-born businessman and political figure in Prince Edward Island.

He was born in County Westmeath, the son of Francis Longworth, and came to St. John's Island (later Prince Edward Island) around 1791. He had learned the trade of tanning leather and established a tannery at Charlottetown. In 1797, he married Agnes Auld. He was elected to represent Georgetown in the Legislative Assembly of Prince Edward Island in an 1803 by-election and served until 1806. Longworth was named a justice of the peace in 1814. He served three terms as high sheriff for Queens County, being named to this post by Governor Charles Douglass Smith. Smith had made enemies among the powerful landowners on the island and, as his loyal supporter, Longworth was also criticized. However, he was named high sheriff again in 1835 and his sons Francis and John went on to serve in the provincial assembly. Longworth also served as lieutenant-colonel in the militia. He helped establish the Benevolent Irish Society on the island in 1825 and served as its president. He died at Charlottetown in 1843.
