= Norman Longworth =

British educational theorist (born 1936)

Norman Longworth (born 1936) is a British educational theorist who was a professor of lifelong learning at several universities.

He is probably best known for the creation of the 'learning Ladder' a diagram describing the stages in human learning, and for his international reputation in the field of Lifelong Learning and, in particular, the development of Learning cities. In his writings 'Cities, Towns and Regions are where the development of human and social potential takes first priority' (Peter Finnegan, Foreword to Learning Cities, Learning Regions, Learning Communities – Lifelong Learning and Local Government Taylor and Francis, 2006). In the same book Longworth says ' A learning City, Town or Region goes beyond its statutory duty to provide education and training for those who require it, and instead creates a vibrant, participative, culturally aware and economically buoyant human environment through the provision, justification and active promotion of learning opportunities to enhance the potential of all its citizens (ibid Chapter 2 Page 23)

Norman Longworth was born in a working class district of Bolton, Lancashire in March 1936. He was educated at the Bolton School but did not immediately go to university, largely because of family poverty. After a period of national service teaching statistics in the Royal Air Force he trained as a school teacher specialising in Geography and French, and became Head of Geography in two secondary schools in the North of England. A change of career took him into the field of Private business, working for a multi-national company in the UK France and Belgium. Here he developed the UK's first schools-industry 'twinning' programme, in which companies and schools cooperated in the development of human and monetary resources for education. ('The Woodberry Down School/IBM Twinning project, in Longworth, Lifelong Learning in Action - Transforming Education in the 21st Century, PP47–48, Taylor and Francis 2003). He also chaired the UK Industrial Society's schools industry panel and sat on the Secretary of State's committee for microelectronics education development. A period in University researching for an M Phil degree in the 1970s saw him create a pioneering nine module course on information processing for children which was taught in schools in the UK, Australia and elsewhere. At the end of his industry career he was the manager of external education programmes for Europe, Middle East and Africa creating many links between education and industry at all levels and in particular helping to develop a satellite-based continuing professional development programme between leading edge researchers and scientists and managers in industry. (EUROpace).

He then commenced his more academic career as UNESCO-IBM Professor of Information Technology at Southampton University on secondment from IBM, a progression which led, on retirement from IBM, to a wider career as professor of lifelong learning in several European universities. He was an honorary Professor of Lifelong Learning at the University of Stirling in the UK when he developed the Learning Ladder, and has written several books on lifelong learning and learning cities and regions as templates for future development. His output also includes downloadable learning lessons on most aspects of learning city development.

During the 1990s he was President of the European Lifelong Learning Initiative, writing well-received books on Lifelong Learning (Lifelong Learning – Taylor and Francis/Routledge, 1996) and the burgeoning concept of Learning Cities (Making Lifelong Learning Work - Learning Cities for a Learning Century – Taylor and Francis, 1999 and 2003). As a result, he is regarded as one of the world's leading experts in these fields. His books have been translated into Spanish, Italian, Chinese, Lithuanian and other languages.

He has been a visiting professor of lifelong learning in several European universities – Sheffield Hallam, Napier Edinburgh, Stirling, ESC Toulouse – managing international developmental projects with Universities from several countries, and has delivered keynote and invited speeches at conferences in more than 30 countries world-wide. He has advised International Governmental Organisations – EC, OECD, UNESCO – and helped the latter to establish a Global Network of Learning Cities which it is hoped will transform the way in which cities perceive and manage a more prosperous, stable and sustainable future.

In 2001 he wrote the European Commission's policy document on the Local and Regional Dimension of Lifelong Learning (Learning Cities and Regions). He has also been active as a consultant in PASCAL, the global observatory on Place Management, Social Capital and Learning Regions. He continued to lead European projects and to speak at conferences until his retirement at the age of 80 in 2016. He now lives in the Pyrennees of France where he writes books (The Conflent Tales, Amazon 2016; Le Conflent Sublime, 2021, Amazon), poetry in English and French, some of it referencing his work in Learning Cities and Leaning Nations. Works of poetry include 'Poems for a Thinking Nation' Poems for a Safer Planet, and 'Notre Monde', Amazon 2017 and 2018, ' The Boy from the Back Streets of Bolton' Amazon, 2020,'Poems to help you think, smile and learn' Amazon, 2020 and 'Tales to Tickle the Intellect' Amazon, 2021. He also composes music, mostly in SATB for choirs. He still contributes op-eds and blogs to PASCAL.
