= Isaac Pendleton Langworthy =

American physician

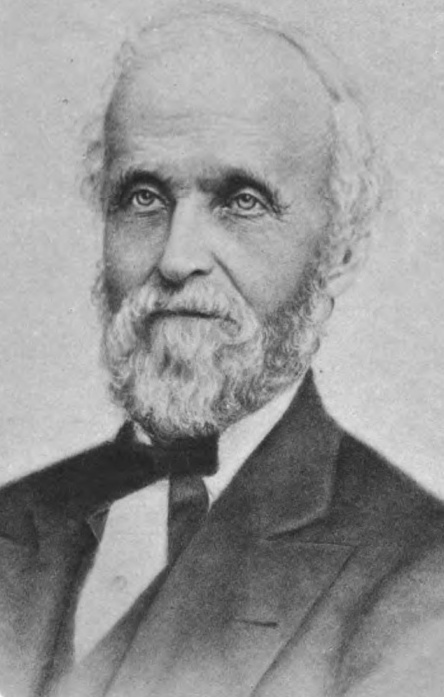
- Born: January 19, 1806
- Died: January 5, 1888 (aged 81)
- Education: Harvard Medical School, Yale University, Yale Divinity School
- Occupation: Medical doctor, librarian

Isaac Pendleton Langworthy (January 19, 1806 – January 5, 1888) was an American Congregational minister.

Langworthy was born in (North) Stonington, Connecticut, January 19, 1806, to John and Sarah (Pendleton) Langworthy. After working as a schoolteacher and in business, he studied medicine, attending one course of lectures at the Harvard Medical School, established a medical practice in his hometown at the age of 25. During a period of religious revival in his community, Langworthy decided to enter the ministry. At the age of 27 he began to prepare for College, supporting himself meantime by his medical practice and by teaching music. He graduated from Yale College in 1839. After graduation, he spent two years in the Yale Divinity School.

In 1841, Langworthy moved to Chelsea, Massachusetts, where he organized a new Congregational church, of which he was ordained pastor, November 10, 1841. He resigned this position on the seventeenth anniversary of his settlement. His residence continued in Chelsea until his death.

Shortly before his withdrawal from the pastorate, he had accepted the position of Corresponding Secretary of the American Congregational Union, in Boston, with the main work of building churches and parsonages for missionary congregations but after ten years, in 1867, he exchanged this duty for a corresponding relation to the American Congregational Association, and devoted himself thenceforth to the congenial task of securing and enlarging a Congregational House and Library, in Boston. By the time of his retirement from active service in 1887 he was responsible for the constructions of a denominational house, and a valuable library which had been increased by gifts procured through his efforts from around 3500 to over 33,000 volumes.

After a short period of feeble health, followed by a few weeks of more rapid failure, he died in Chelsea, on January 5, 1888, at the age of 82.

He married, on August 8, 1842, Sarah, daughter of Cyrus Williams, of New Haven. His children, three sons and a daughter, died before him.

Langworthy received the honorary degree of Doctor of Divinity from Iowa College in 1878. His papers were archived at the New York Public Library around 1934.

== Publications ==
- A Good Law: A Sermon on the Liquor Law of Massachusetts, delivered in the Chestnut Street Congregational Church, Chelsea, July 18, 1852.
