= T. V. John Langworthy =

American composer (born 1947)

T. V. John Langworthy (born John Alan Langworthy, August 20, 1947) is an American songwriter singer, composer, television personality, comedian and dream-reenactment music video producer. Not knowing how to play a musical instrument, he has recorded over 6,000 songs a cappella from his dreams. In his Maxern Records studio, he has subsequently recorded and released hundreds of dream songs with his Legendary Band.

Langworthy attributes the start of his career to a 1985 experience where God spoke to him in a dream, and, since then, he states his dreams have been filled with "heaven-sent" songs - despite his having no prior musical background.

== Career ==
Langworthy was born into a United States Air Force family in San Antonio, Texas. Consequently, he attended thirty-seven schools throughout the United States and Germany, before attending college at the University of Massachusetts where he earned a Bachelor of Arts in European History. He received a full scholarship in San Francisco's acting school at The American Conservatory Theater. He then traveled around the world from 1969 to 1972. in 1992, Langworthy quit his day job as a Yellow Pages advertising salesman, and he formed The Legendary Band.

His one-hour public-access television program The T.V. John Show showcases songwriters, where he opens and closes each show with dream songs. The internet provides worldwide distribution for his songs, music videos and television programs. TBD.com of ABC's Channel 8 News in Arlington, Virginia called Langworthy “the most interesting personality of our time”.

Langworthy is the sole proprietor of Maxern Records, the record company that records his dream songs and makes his music videos.

== Discography ==
- Dream Songs (1991)
- Dream Power (1993)
- Dream Maker (1993)
- Dream On (1994)
- T.V. John Live at Backstreets Café (2006)
- T.V. John Live at the Lone Star Grill (2007)
- Dreamzzz (2008)
- Sunrise Dreams (2008)
- Dream Realities (2009)
- T.V. John Live at Green Island Café (2010)
- Dream Album (2010)
- Vivid Dreams (2010)
- Dream Catcher (2011)
- In Your Dreams (2011)
- Dream Treasures (2012)
- Dream Horizons (2012)
- Dream Revelations (2012)
- Dream Tracks (2013)
- Dream Patterns (2013)
- Dream Tunes (2013)
- Best Dream Hits (2013)
- Dream Gifts (2014)
- Beyond Dreams (2014)
- Dreaming of You (2015)
- Dream Maestro (2015)
- Dream Harvest (2015)
- Dream Life (2015)
- Oh, Dream On, You Dream Dreaming Dreamer Dream Dream (2016)
- Dream Hopes (2016)
- Dream Until Your Dreams Come True (2016)
- Dreaming Dreamer (2016)
- Dream On Honey (ETA February 2017)
