= Helen Langworthy =

American theater director, professor and journalist

Helen Langworthy (Oct 11, 1899 – 15 May 1991) was an American theater director, professor and journalist. Most of her professional life was devoted to the Little Theatre of the Rockies in Greeley, Colorado.

== Early life and education ==
She was born in Massena, Iowa.

As a graduate student, she had devoted herself to directing university productions and studying American theater during the pioneer epoch. Helen Langworthy was named assistant director of the State University of Iowa theatre in 1924. Among other productions, she directed the Edna Ferber and George Kaufman comedy Minick in Iowa in the 1925–1926 season. In 1926, she submitted a master's thesis to the same university titled "The theatre in the lower valley of the Ohio, 1797–1860". She also did graduate studies at the Irvine studio, American Laboratory Theater, and the Theater of the New School for Social Research. She received her PhD from Iowa in 1952, having written her dissertation on "Theatre in The Pioneer Cities of Lexington, Kentucky and Cincinnati, Ohio."

== Career ==
Langworthy founded The Little Theatre of the Rockies in Greeley in 1934. It was, chronologically speaking the second of two theatres in the Denver area. Their first show was The First Mrs. Meeker. The theatre closed from 1941 to 1943 because of the war. Arson burned the theatre in Cranford Hall, and the company moved for five years to Greeley High School, where they performed in the auditorium.

The Little Theatre of the Rockies developed into a pre-professional theatre and engaged scores of Denver students as well as interns from across the nations.

Langworthy managed the Little Theatre's affairs and also directed very many of the productions staged there. She directed their performance of Seán O'Casey's Juno and the Paycock (1924) in 1941, as well as their 1959 production of Gogol's The Inspector General at Little Theatre of the Rockies. It was the Winter play at UNC that year.

=== Journalism ===
She worked as a journalist and short story writer for decades, publishing with The Christian Science Monitor and The Grail (published by the Benedictines of St. Meinrad's Abbey in Indiana), among many others.

== Death ==
She retired in 1965 and died in Denver, Colorado.

== Awards and honors ==
In the summer of 1965, she won the Tajiri Award. The Helen Langworthy Theatre, opened at UNC in the 1950s as the Frasier Theatrer, was named after her. The university distinguishes promising students of theatre with the Dr. Helen Langworthy Award.
