= Mosque No. 11 =

Coordinates: 42.311554°N 71.080141°W

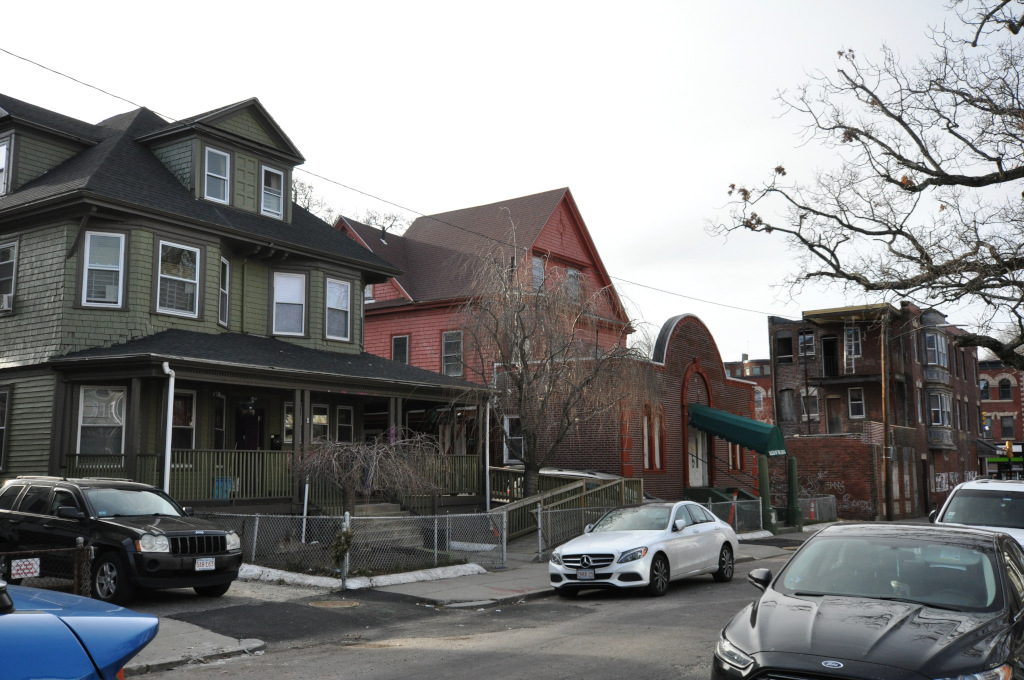
- Mosque No. 11 (right) and Farrakhan House (left)

Religion
- Affiliation: Islam

Location
- Location: 35 Intervale Street, Dorchester, Massachusetts, United States
- Interactive map of Mosque No. 11

Architecture
- Minaret: 0

Mosque No. 11, also known as Masjid Al-Quran, was a mosque in Boston, Massachusetts. The building came to prominence in the late 1950s when it was leased by the Nation of Islam and placed under the direction of Malcolm X, who was a minister there and at Mosques No. 7 and No. 12 until he left the religion for Sunni Islam in 1964.

== History ==
Previously used as a synagogue, 35 and 37 Intervale was purchased in 1957 as Temple No. 11 of the Nation of Islam in 1962 (all Nation of Islam sites were initially called Temples; the NOI later switched to the term mosque). The mosque was later moved to 2508 North Broad Street.

In 1952, Malcolm X became a minister at Mosque No. 11. Louis Farrakhan was also a minister at Mosque No. 11, and 37 Intervale Street became his living quarters. It was also considered a home of Malcolm X.

When Malcolm X left the Nation of Islam in 1964, he started a Sunni Muslim mosque named Muslim Mosque Inc.

== See also ==
- Wallace Fard Muhammad
- Bibliography of Malcolm X
- Bibliography of Martin Luther King Jr.
