= John Longworth (lawyer) =

Canadian politician

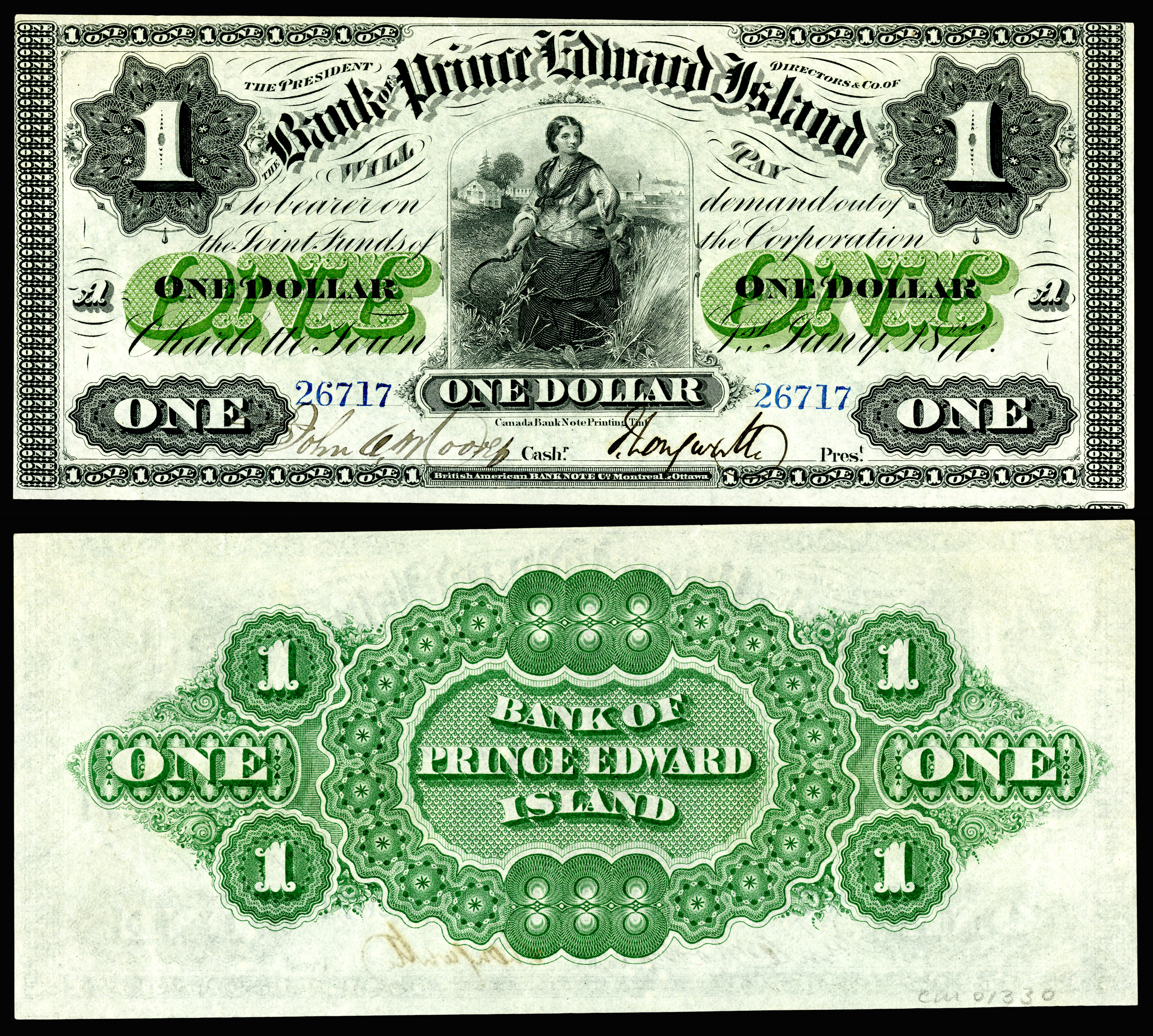
1877 $1 Bank of Prince Edward Island banknote signed by John Longworth as bank president.

John Longworth, QC (September 19, 1814 – April 11, 1885) was a lawyer, judge and political figure in Prince Edward Island. He represented 2nd Queens in the Legislative Assembly of Prince Edward Island from 1846 to 1850 and from 1858 to 1867 as a Conservative member.

== Biography ==
He was born in Charlottetown, the son of Francis Longworth, and educated there. Longworth studied law with Robert Hodgson, was admitted as an attorney to the Supreme Court of Prince Edward Island and set up practice as a lawyer and notary public in Charlottetown. In 1847, he married Elizabeth White Tremaine. Longworth served as a deputy judge in the colony's vice admiralty court. He was a founding director of the Bank of Prince Edward Island, later serving as its president, and was also agent for a number of insurance firms. Longworth served as a member of the colony's Executive Council from 1859 to 1867. He opposed Confederation and supported free trade with the United States. In 1863, he was named Queen's Counsel. Longworth was named to the Charlottetown Board of School Trustees in 1878. He died in Charlottetown in 1885.

His brother Francis served in the provincial assembly.
