= Great Chelsea fire of 1908 =

Fire in Chelsea, Massachusetts, United States

Coordinates: 42°23′49.32″N 71°2′38.78″W

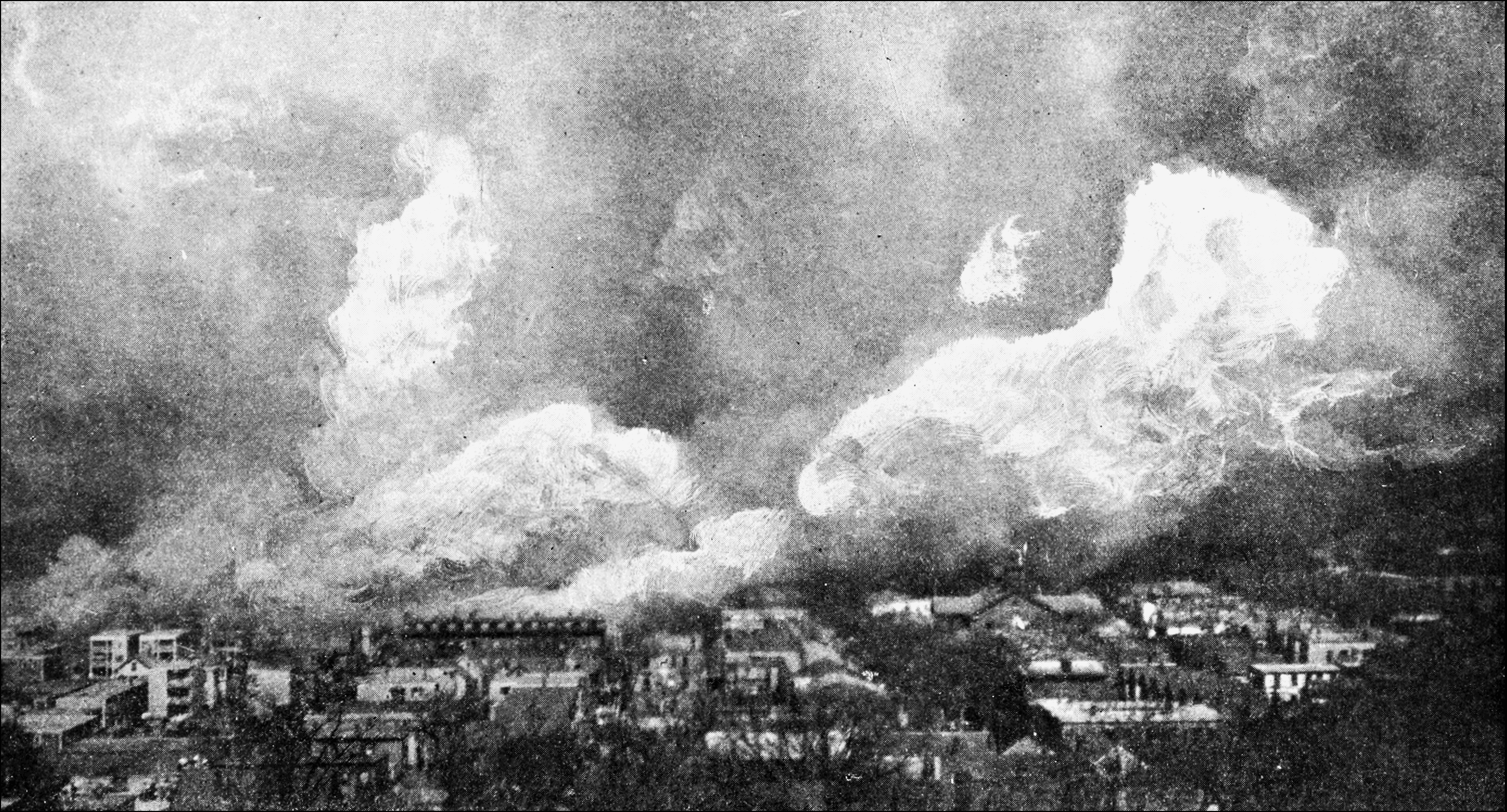
The fire, as viewed from the nearby Chelsea Naval Hospital

The Great Chelsea fire of 1908, also known as the first Great Chelsea fire, was a conflagration that occurred on April 12, 1908, in Chelsea, Massachusetts, a city directly across the Chelsea River from East Boston. Nineteen people were killed, 15,000 were left homeless, and 350 acres (140 ha) were burned in the fire. The fire started 200 yards (180 m) away from the Great Chelsea fire of 1973.

== Background ==
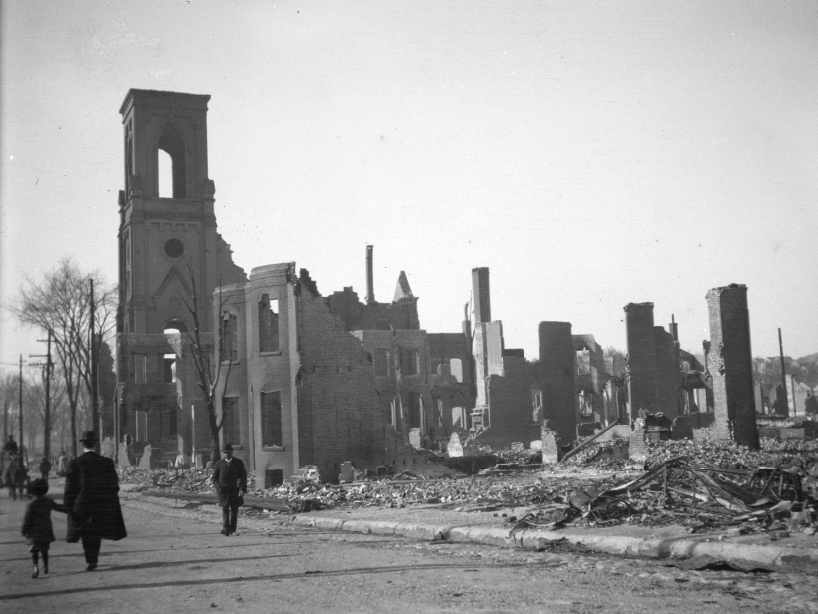
Congregational Church after Great Chelsea Fire

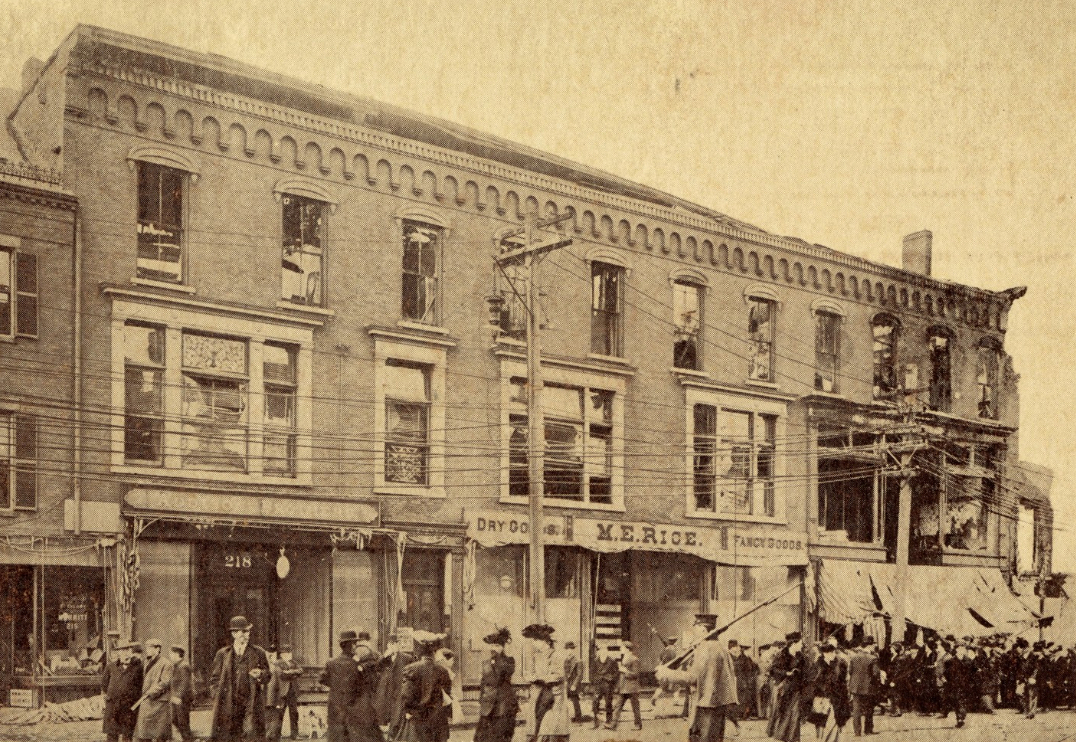
Knights of Columbus Block, Chelsea Square, 12 April 1908

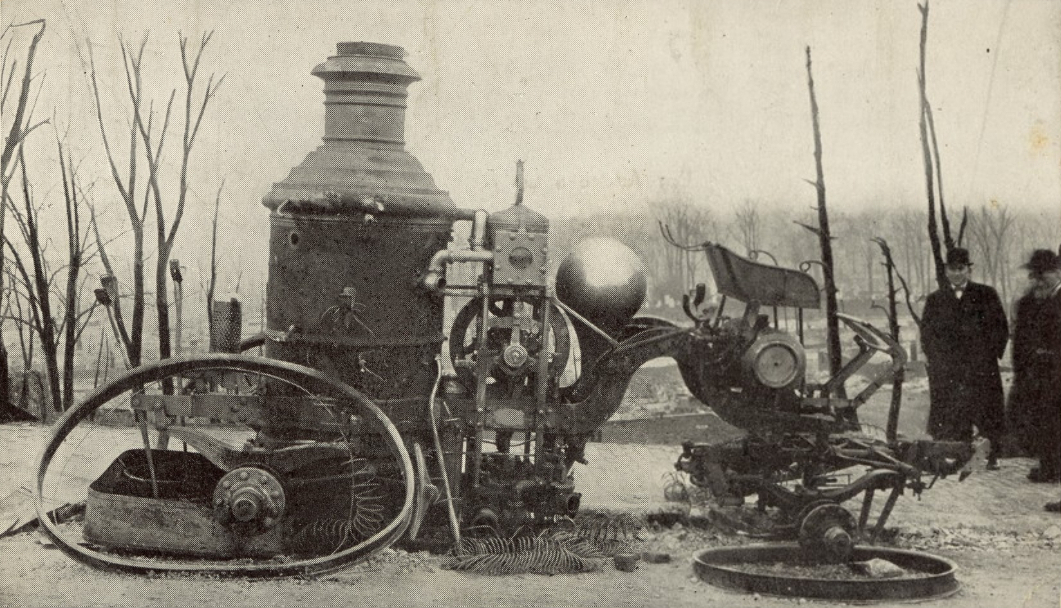
"Lynn Fire Engine No. 1" on 12 April 1908 after Chelsea Fire

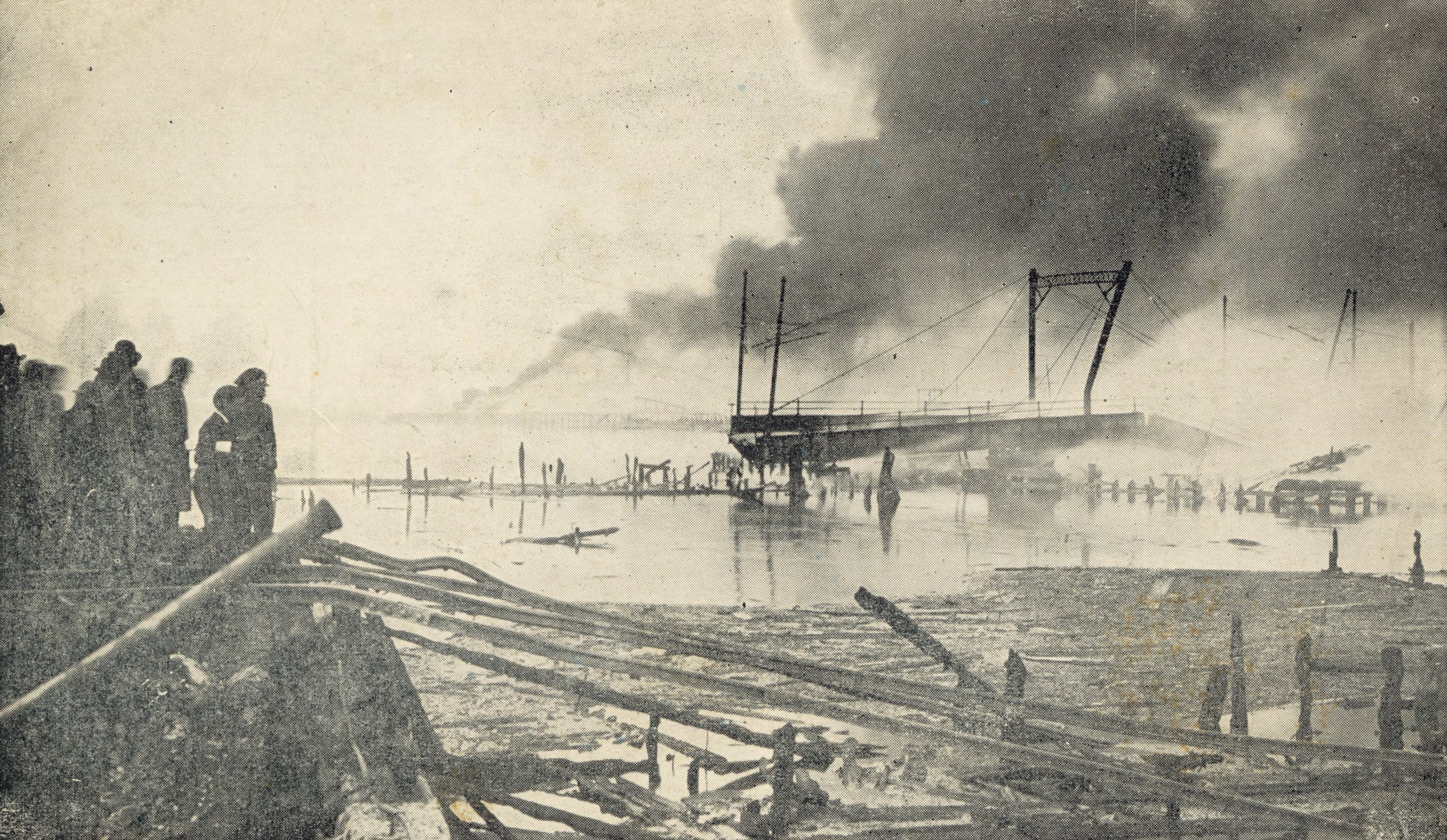
Grand Junction Railroad and Chelsea Street bridges after Chelsea Fire on 12 April 1908

According to a summary of the fire at the time:

On Sunday April 12 1908, at about 11 in the morning, an alarm was rung for a fire in the works of the Boston Blacking Company on West 3rd Street, near the Everett line. The fire department responded immediately, and quickly succeeded in putting the fire out with little damage, but the forty-mile gale that was blowing at the time carried sparks to nearby houses, and soon all the frame buildings in the vicinity were ablaze. The fire then traveled quickly in an easterly direction, and despite the best efforts of the department, was soon beyond control.

Aid was called-in from nearby cities, but even the much larger fighting force was unable to cope with the fire, and could only attempt to keep it within certain limits. So intense was the heat of the fire that buildings made of solid granite crumbled, and were entirely destroyed. The fire could not be checked in its easterly course, and in a short time traveled across the city and was stopped only by the (this had to be the Chelsea River (a.k.a. Chelsea Creek), as the Mystic River is on the Southwestern side of the city, closer to Everett. The Chelsea River/Creek separates Chelsea from East Boston, and the Meridian St. Bridge is essentially where the river opens to the harbor.) Mystic River at the East Boston line. Almost the entire business section along Broadway was destroyed by the fire, with the northern boundary being the Boston & Maine Railroad tracks, and the southern boundary being Chelsea Square.

Among the more prominent public buildings that were destroyed include the City Hall, YMCA, Odd Fellows, and Chelsea Savings Bank buildings. About eight schools and a dozen churches were burnt down. The total number of buildings destroyed was about 1500, and between 10,000 to 12,000 people were rendered homeless.

News about the fire spread quickly. Relief funds were generated from all over the country, with many of the cities and towns in Massachusetts giving substantial amounts for the stricken city. Within two weeks after the fire, the relief committee had received about $300,000, with many more thousands given directly by employers of the burnt-out families, and by fraternal organizations such as Knights of Columbus, Knights of Pythias, Odd Fellows, Elks, and Eagles. The committee immediately opened relief stations at the new High School building and at Lincoln Hall, and thousands were fed at these two places daily.

By Tuesday April 14th, great quantities of clothing had been received for distribution, and a receiving station was established at Boston where contributions of household goods could be gathered. On Wednesday, a large number of people were furnished with cooking utensils and mattresses, and by Saturday thousands of sets of bed-clothing had been distributed. In response to a call from the relief committee, hundreds of automobiles offered their services in delivering goods to the homeless, and the relief work was greatly aided by this means.

== See also ==
- List of disasters in Massachusetts by death toll
