= Clapp =

Clapp is an English surname, most commonly found in the West Country and in the United States. The word signifies rough ground, or a small hill.

Some men who brought the surname "Clapp" to America include:

Captain Roger Clapp, who came to the New World on the ship Mary and John, which landed at Nantasket (now Hull, Massachusetts), on May 30, 1630. He helped establish the town of Dorchester, Massachusetts, soon afterward. He worked for many years in important positions for the town and in the military organization, including a long period as commandant of Castle Island.

Deacon Edward Clapp, an older brother of Roger, arrived in Dorchester, Massachusetts, in 1633. It has mistakenly been reported that he had no children, but his last will and testament prove otherwise. Edward was married to Prudence, and their son Nehemiah married Sarah Leavitt, daughter of John Leavitt, one of the first settlers of Dorchester and later of Hingham, Massachusetts. Nehemiah Clapp lived in Hingham for a few years, but relocated to Dorchester, where he died at age 38 in 1684.

Thomas Clapp, a cousin of Roger and Edward, arrived in the same ship as Edward in 1633. He later moved to Weymouth, and then to Scituate, Massachusetts, where he was a Deputy of the Court.

Deacon Nicholas Clapp, brother of Thomas, arrived in Dorchester, Massachusetts, in 1633. He was an upstanding member of his community, occasionally mediating disputes.

George Gilson Clapp came to America in 1666, residing for a time in South Carolina before settling in Westchester County, New York.

== People with the surname ==
- Allen Clapp (born 1967), American singer, guitarist and songwriter, The Orange Peels
- Almon M. Clapp (1811–1899), American politician and first Public Printer of the United States
- Asa Clapp (merchant) (1762–1848), American merchant and politician
- Asa Clapp (politician) (1805–1891), American politician, son of the above
- Austin Clapp (1910–1971), American swimmer and water polo player
- Benjamin Clapp (born 1977), American musician
- Benjamin L. Clapp (1814–1865), American Mormon leader
- Cameron Clapp (born 1986), American disabled athlete and actor
- Chester B. Clapp (1883–?), American screenwriter
- Cornelia Clapp (1849–1934), American zoologist
- Dominic Clapp (born 1980), English cricketer
- George Hubbard Clapp (1858–1949), American pioneer in the aluminum industry
- Gordon Clapp (born 1948), American actor
- Harold Winthrop Clapp (1875–1952), Australian transport administrator
- Harvey Clapp (1817–1889), American farmer and politician
- Hilary Pit-a-pit Clapp (1894–1945), Igorot doctor and politician
- James Kilton Clapp (1897–1965), American electrical engineer and inventor
- John Clapp (artist), professor and children's book illustrator
- John Clapp (baseball) (1851–1904), American baseball player and manager
- Joseph Dorr Clapp (1811–1900), American businessman and politician
- Krissada Sukosol Clapp (born 1970), Thai singer and actor
- Louise Clapp (1934–1967), American baseball player
- Louise Brough Clapp (1923–2014), American tennis player in
- Margaret Clapp (1910–1974), American scholar, educator and Pulitzer Prize winner
- Mark R. Clapp (1803–1891), American politician and farmer
- Michael Clapp (born 1932), Royal Navy commodore, Amphibious Force commander in the Falklands War
- Moses E. Clapp (1851–1929), American lawyer and politician
- Nicholas Clapp (1936–2025), American writer and filmmaker
- Philip Greeley Clapp (1888–1954), American educator, conductor, pianist and composer
- Priscilla A. Clapp (born 1941), American diplomat
- Stubby Clapp (born 1973), Canadian baseball player
- Robert Edwin Clapp (1855–after 1908), Canadian physician and politician
- Susannah Clapp (born 1949), British theatre critic, writer and book editor
- Thomas Clap or Clapp (1703–1767), American academic and educator, President of Yale College
- Tom Clapp (1858–1933), English rugby player
- Verner Clapp (1901–1972), American librarian and writer
- Will Clapp (born 1995), American football player
- Philip John Clapp, aka Johnny Knoxville (born 1971), American actor
- Alice Louise Clapp 1992 Portsmouth uk

== See also ==
- Louise Amelia Knapp Smith Clappe, a.k.a. "Dame Shirley", an American writer (d. 1906)
- William Clapp House, in Dorchester, Massachusetts, built in 1806
- Captain Lemuel Clap House, also in Dorchester, MA, built in 1767
- Clapp oscillator, an oscillator invented in 1948 by James K. Clapp
- Clap (disambiguation)
- Klapp
