= Clapp House =

Clapp House may refer to:

- L.W. Clapp House, Wichita, Kansas, listed on the National Register of Historic Places (NRHP)
- R.D.W. Clapp House, Wichita, Kansas, listed on the NRHP
- Charles Q. Clapp House, Portland, Maine
- Clapp Houses, Boston, Massachusetts
- William Clapp House, Dorchester, Massachusetts
- George Clapp House, Grafton, Massachusetts
- Leverett and Amanda Clapp House, Centreville, Michigan
- Silas Clapp House, West Warwick, Rhode Island
