= Klappert =

Klappert is a surname. Notable people with the surname include:

- Peter Klappert (born 1942), American poet
- Marianne Klappert, German politician, see List of Social Democratic Party of Germany members

== See also ==
- Klapper
- Klapp
