= Asa Clapp =

Asa Clapp is the name of:

- Asa Clapp (merchant) (1762–1848), American merchant and politician
- Asa Clapp (politician) (1805–1891), American politician, son of the above
