= James H. Stark =

British-American printer, publisher, and writer (1847–1919)

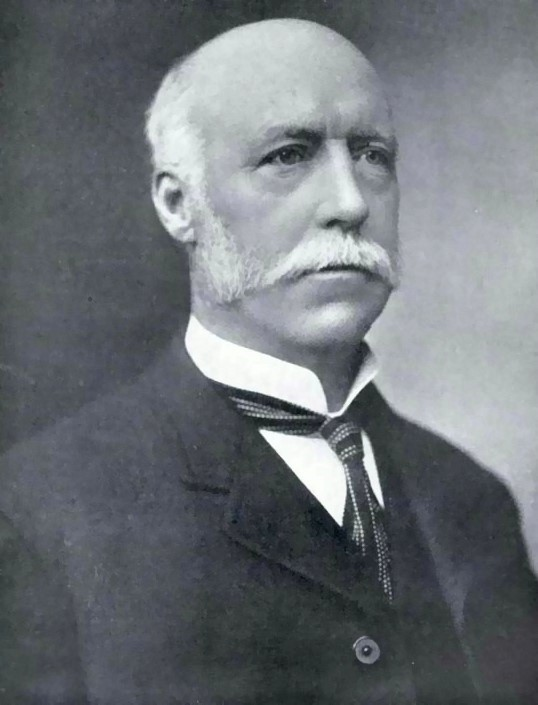
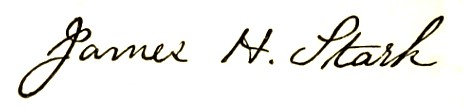
- James Henry Stark
- Born: 6 July 1847; Mitcham, England
- Died: 30 August 1919 (aged 72); Boston, Massachusetts, United States
- Occupations: Printer, publisher, and non-fiction writer
- Known for: Guidebooks to the British West Indies (1884–1903); The Loyalists of Massachusetts and the Other Side of the American Revolution (1910)

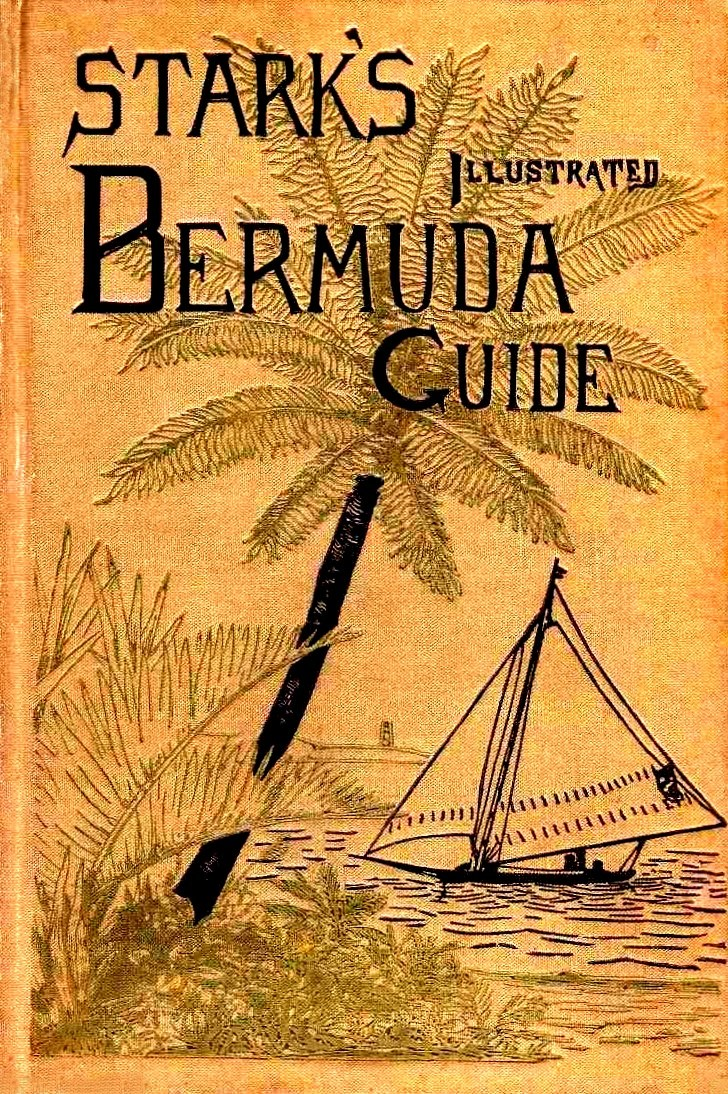
Stark's Illustrated Bermuda Guide, 1st edition, 1884

James Henry Stark (6 July 1847 – 30 August 1919) was a British-American printer, publisher, and non-fiction writer, known for his six guidebooks to the British West Indies and Bermuda, and for a controversial account of the Loyalists of Massachusetts during the American Revolution. He was vice-president of the Dorchester Historical Society, Boston, and gave his name to their Stark Collection of Antiquities and Curiosities.

== Early life and family ==
James Stark was born in Vine House, Mitcham, England, on 6 July 1847 to John Henry Stark, a language teacher, and his wife Mary Elizabeth Ann A'Court. He was raised by his maternal grandfather, Thomas Cook A'Court, at Shepton Mallet, England, until the age of nine. In 1856 his father travelled from his home in the United States and brought James to Boston where he was educated in public schools.

He married Katherine (Kate) Manton, who was of English descent, at Saint Matthew's Church in Boston in 1876. They had three daughters. He became an American citizen.

== Career ==
Stark entered the printing trade in 1864 to learn stereotyping and electrotyping and in 1870 started his own business which was destroyed in the Great Boston Fire of 1872. He then devoted himself to yachting for several years before establishing a stereotype and electrotype foundry business. In 1877 with William H. Mumler, he established the Photo-Electrotype Company in Boston of which he was president until his retirement in 1900 when he moved into real estate.

== Writing ==
He is best known for his six volumes of guidebooks to Bermuda and the British West Indies published from 1884 to 1903, the first of which was Stark's Illustrated Bermuda Guide for which he took the photographs himself in early 1884, being careful to note in the book the technical process by which they were reproduced using his firm's technology. The Bahamas followed in 1891, and British Guiana in the 1890s in collaboration with the noted Guyanese historian James Rodway. Later volumes covered Trinidad, Tobago, Grenada, St Vincent, Jamaica, and Barbados. He was described by The Spectator in 1898 as assuming "the role of a modern Hakluyt".

Stark also wrote on American history; his account of the loyalists of Massachusetts during the American Revolution drawing angry responses when it was published in 1910 for its questioning of the motives of the American revolutionaries in Boston, many of whom were the ancestors of prominent families in modern Boston. He was accused of "muck-raking" and criticized by a local historian for his account of scandals relating to Benjamin Franklin.

The William and Mary Quarterly took a more moderate tone, welcoming the book's fact-based narrative as an antidote to the partisan hero-worship of the leaders of the American Revolution that it felt had damaged American historical scholarship but feeling that perhaps Stark went too far in the other direction in his attempt to redress the balance. The reviewer noted, however, that despite the criticism of Samuel Adams, Benjamin Franklin, John Adams, and John Hancock, Stark still lionized them, seeing them as rascals but "our rascals" in fomenting the revolution.

== Personal life ==
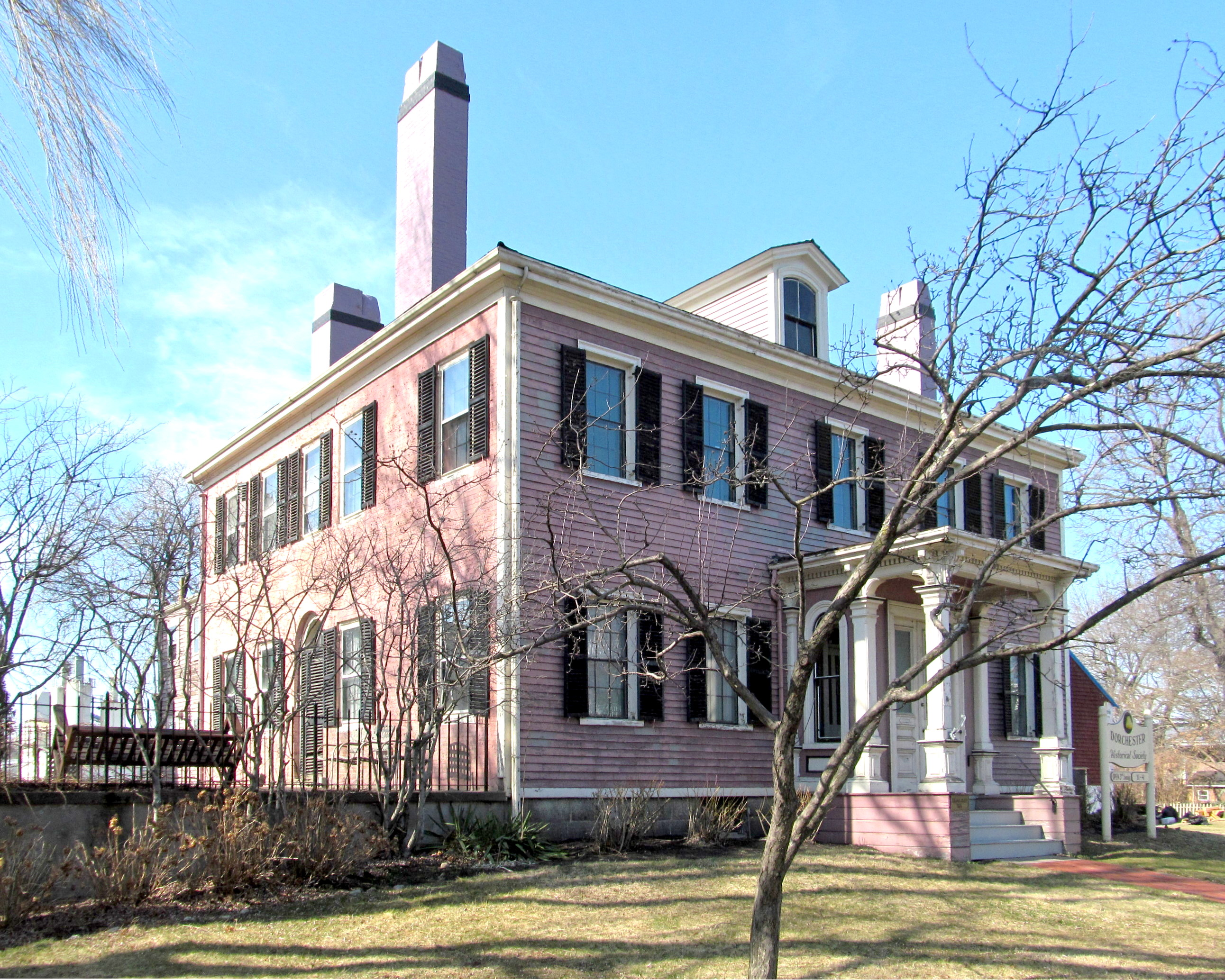
William Clapp House, current headquarters of the Dorchester Historical Society

Stark was vice-president of the Dorchester Historical Society and gave his name to their Stark Collection of Antiquities and Curiosities. He was the president of the British Charitable Society and a founder of the British-American Association through which he claimed to have obtained the naturalization of 35,000 British citizens as Americans. He was the vice-president of the Victorian Club and a freemason.

Politically, he was a Republican and a member of the United Empire Loyalists' Association of Canada.

A keen yachtsman, he was commodore of the Savin Hill Yacht Club, the Rock Hill Yacht Club, and the South Boston Yacht Club which he founded. Around 1874, he and two friends sailed a schooner to South America to prospect in French and Dutch Guiana for gold and it was said in his obituary that they discovered the first gold in Dutch Guiana. He made many yachting trips to the Caribbean and Central America and travelled in Great Britain and Europe. From 1884, he spent most winters in the British West Indies.

Stark died in Boston on 30 August 1919.

== Selected publications ==
=== Guidebooks ===
- Stark's Illustrated Bermuda Guide &c. Photo-Electrotype Co., Boston, 1884. (1890 edition)
- Stark's History and Guide to the Bahama Islands &c. James H. Stark, Boston, 1891.
- Stark's Guide-book and History of British Guiana &c. James H. Stark, Boston, c. 1895. (With James Rodway)
- Stark's Guide-book and History of Trinidad including Tobago, Granada, and St. Vincent; also a trip up the Orinoco and a description of the great Venezuelan pitch lake &c. James H. Stark, Boston, 1897.
- Stark's Jamaica Guide (Illustrated) &c. James H. Stark, Boston, 1898.
- Stark's History and Guide to Barbados and the Caribbee Islands &c. James H. Stark, Boston, 1903.

=== Other ===
- Illustrated History of Boston Harbor &c. Photo-Electrotype Engraving Co., Boston, 1880.
- Antique Views of ye Towne of Boston. Photo-Electrotype Engraving Co., Boston, 1882.
- The British and Dutch in South Africa. James H. Stark, Boston, 1900.
- History of the Old Blake House, and a Brief Sketch of the Dorchester Historical Society. 1907.
- Places in Dorchester to Visit During Old-home Week, July 28 to August 3, 1907. Boston, 1907.
- The Loyalists of Massachusetts and the Other Side of the American Revolution. W. B. Clarke, Boston, 1910.
