= Clap =

Clap may refer to:

- Clapping, the percussive sound made by striking together two flat surfaces, as in the body parts of humans or animals
- Gonorrhea, colloquially known as "the clap", a sexually transmitted infection caused by the bacterium Neisseria gonorrhoeae

== Music ==
- "Clap" (Hostyle Gospel song), 2016
- "Clap" (Seventeen song), 2017
- "Clap", an instrumental by Yes from The Yes Album
- "The Clap" (song), from High Risk Behaviour by the Chats

== People ==
- Margaret Clap or Mother Clap (died c. 1726), keeper of a homosexual brothel in London, England
- Thomas Clap or Thomas Clapp (1703–1767), president of Yale College

== Other uses ==
- Clap skate, a type of ice skate used in speed skating
- Clap (film), a 2022 Indian sports drama

== See also ==
- CLAP (disambiguation)
- Clap Clap (disambiguation)
- Clapp, a surname
- Clapper (disambiguation)
- Thunderclap (disambiguation)
