= Horatio N. Jose =

American businessman

- Born: March 18, 1819; Buxton, Maine, U.S.
- Died: October 23, 1892 (aged 73); Portland, Maine, U.S.
- Resting place: Evergreen Cemetery, Portland, Maine, U.S.
- Occupation: Businessman

Horatio Nelson Jose (March 18, 1819 – October 23, 1892) was an American businessman, active in the second half of the 19th century. The Jose Block, at 80 Exchange Street in Portland, Maine, is now named for him, his having been one of the city's richest and most prominent businessmen.

== Early life ==
Jose was born in Buxton, Maine, in 1819 to Alexander Jose and Sally Emery, their fourth son.

== Career ==
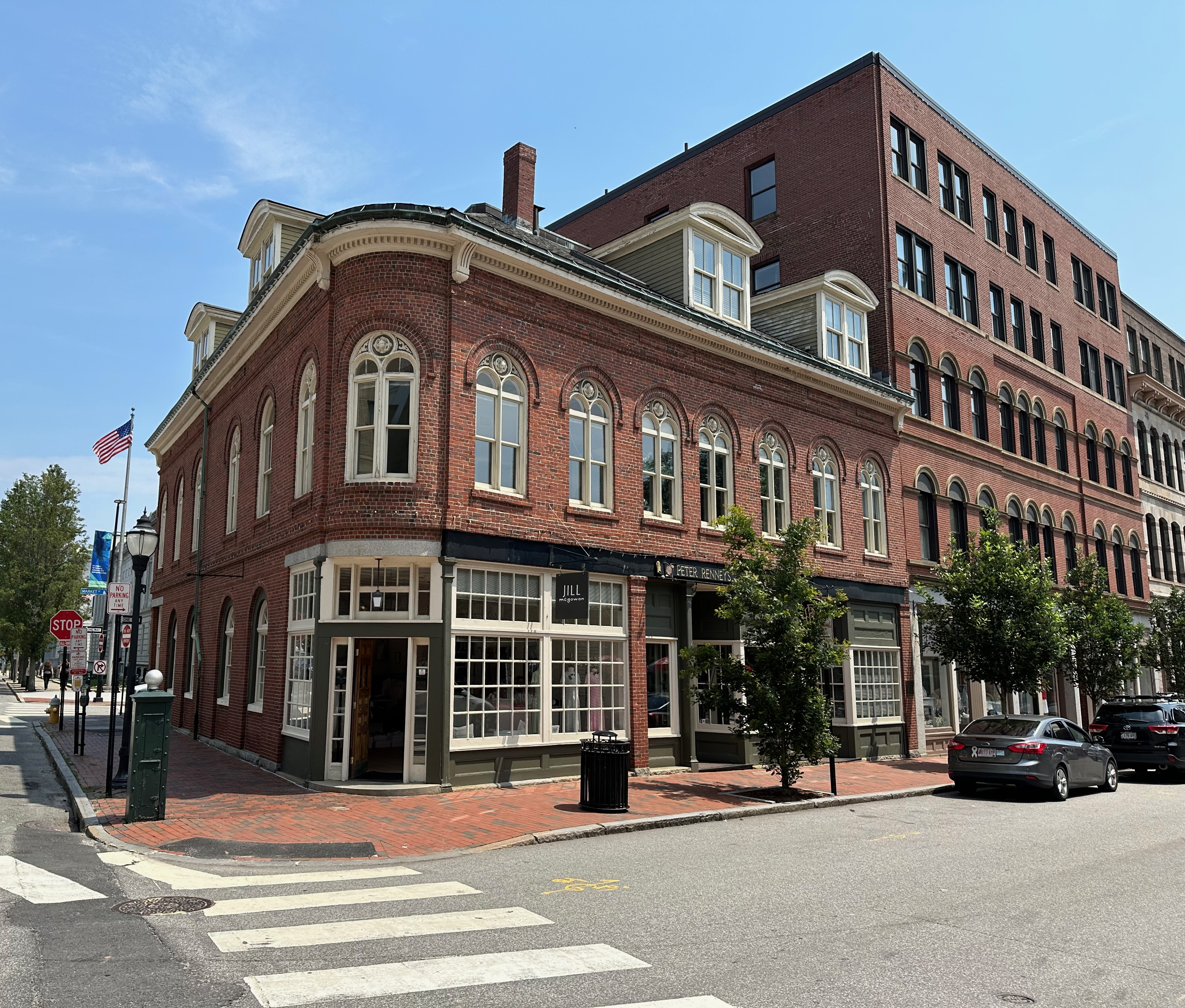
Printers' Exchange Block

With his partner, Joseph H. Poor, Jose operated a dry goods and carpet business between 1840 and 1860.

Jose was a co-founder of Maine General Hospital, an organizer of the Portland and Ogdensburg Railroad and a director of the Portland, Kennebec and Maine Central Railroads. He was also a quartermaster of the 12th Maine Regiment. He served as company treasurer for Portland Kerosene between 1864 and 1879. He then became its president.

In 1866, Jose had built the Printers' Exchange Block on Upper Exchange Street. It was designed by Charles Q. Clapp.

Shortly before his death in 1892, Jose opened Kotzschmar Hall as a convert venue in tribute to musician Hermann Kotzschmar. It is occupied by Geno's Rock Club as of 2025.

== Personal life ==
Jose was married twice: firstly, to Nancy Brown Hooper in 1843, then (upon her death) to Harriet Newell Cammett. He had four children: Horatio Jr. (born 1845), Carrie (1848), Helen (1853) and Jessie (1860).

== Death ==
Jose died in 1892, aged 73. He was interred in Portland's Evergreen Cemetery.
