= Clapper =

Clapper or Clappers may refer to:

== Arts and entertainment ==
- Clappers (record label), a New York-based reggae label
- "Clappers" (song), a 2013 song by Wale
- The Clapper (film), a 2017 American comedy film

== Places ==
- Clapper, Missouri, a community in the United States
- Clappers, Scottish Borders, a small village in Scottish Borders, United Kingdom
- The Clappers, a footbridge across Caversham Lock in Reading, United Kingdom

== People ==
- Billy Clapper (born 1982), American basketball coach
- Dit Clapper (1907–1978), Canadian ice hockey player
- James Clapper (born 1941), former Director of National Intelligence of the United States
- Clapper, a character in the video game Donkey Kong Country 2: Diddy's Kong Quest

== Other uses ==
- Clapper, part of a bell
- Clapper (musical instrument), consisting of two pieces of wood struck together
- Clapper bridge, an ancient form of bridge
- Clapper Post, urban postal service in 18th century Vienna
- Clapperboard, used in film production to aid synchronizing audio and video and to identify different shots
- The Clapper, a sound activated electrical switch
- Clapper (service), a social networking service

== See also ==
- ACLU v. Clapper, a lawsuit involving the American Civil Liberties Union
- Clapper v. Amnesty International USA, a United States Supreme Court case
