= Henry Rowe (architect) =

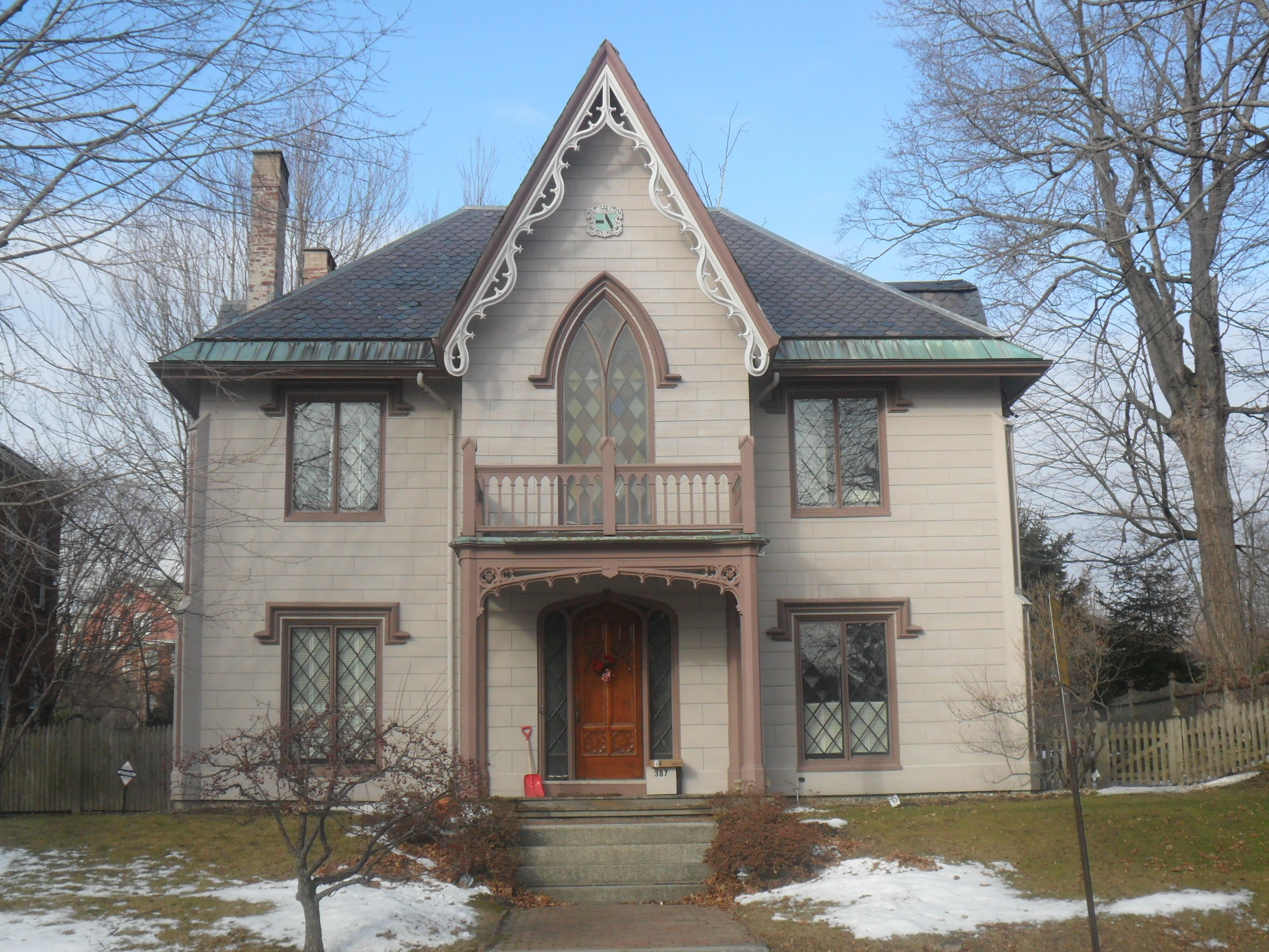
- The Gothic House, Portland, Maine
- Born: 1812; Kinsale, Ireland
- Died: 22 July 1870 (aged 57–58)
- Resting place: Evergreen Cemetery, Portland, Maine
- Occupation: Architect
- Design: The Gothic House

Henry Rowe (1812 – 22 July 1870) was an Irish architect who practiced in nineteenth-century Massachusetts, New York and Maine. One of his most noted designs is The Gothic House (also known as the John J. Brown House), in the Spring Street Historic District of Portland, Maine, which was built in 1845. It is believed to be Rowe's first commission in the state, and is described in city promotional materials as the finest example of Gothic Revival architecture in Maine.

Although it is virtually unaltered, the house was moved west along Spring Street to its current location in 1971 to avoid demolition. It was listed on the National Register of Historic Places in 1974. Today's 49 Main Street in Yarmouth, Maine, was built the same year as The Gothic House.

Rowe has sometimes been confused in literature with Henry Rowe, of Henry Rowe and Sons, who was based in Worcester, England.

== Early life ==
After studying under George Richard Pain in Cork, Ireland, Rowe emigrated to the United States around 1840.

== Career ==
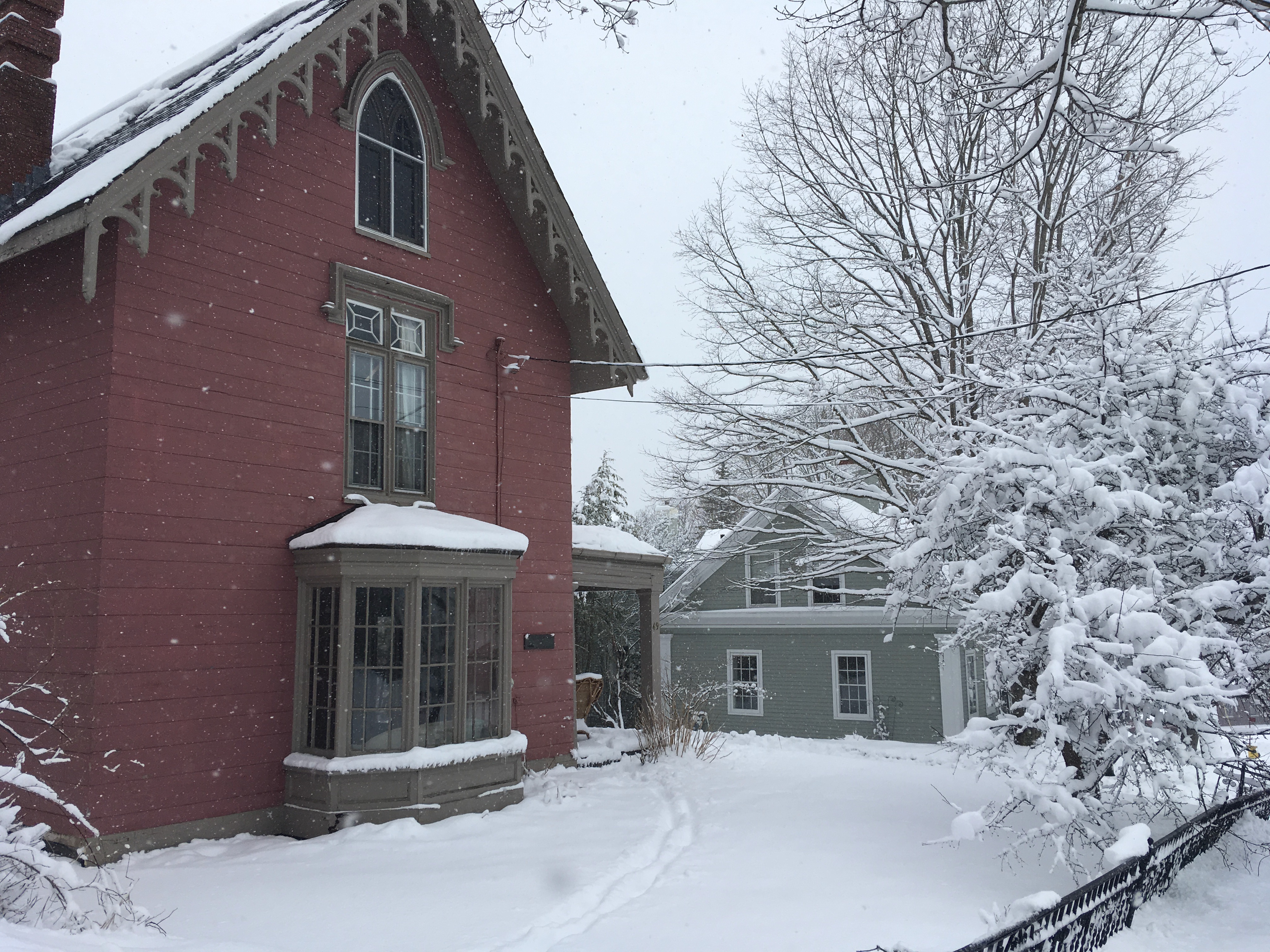
49 Main Street, in Yarmouth, Maine, was built in 1845

Rowe began working in Boston, before moving to New York and, finally, Maine.

=== Notable works ===
- The Gothic House, Portland, Maine
- The Sparrow House, Portland, Maine
- 49 Main Street, Yarmouth, Maine
- S. L. Carleton House, Portland, Maine (demolished in 1914)

== Death ==
Rowe died on 22 July 1870, aged 57 or 58. He is interred in Portland's Evergreen Cemetery.
