= The Gothic House =

Historic house in Maine, United States

- U.S. National Register of Historic Places
- U.S. Historic district – Contributing property
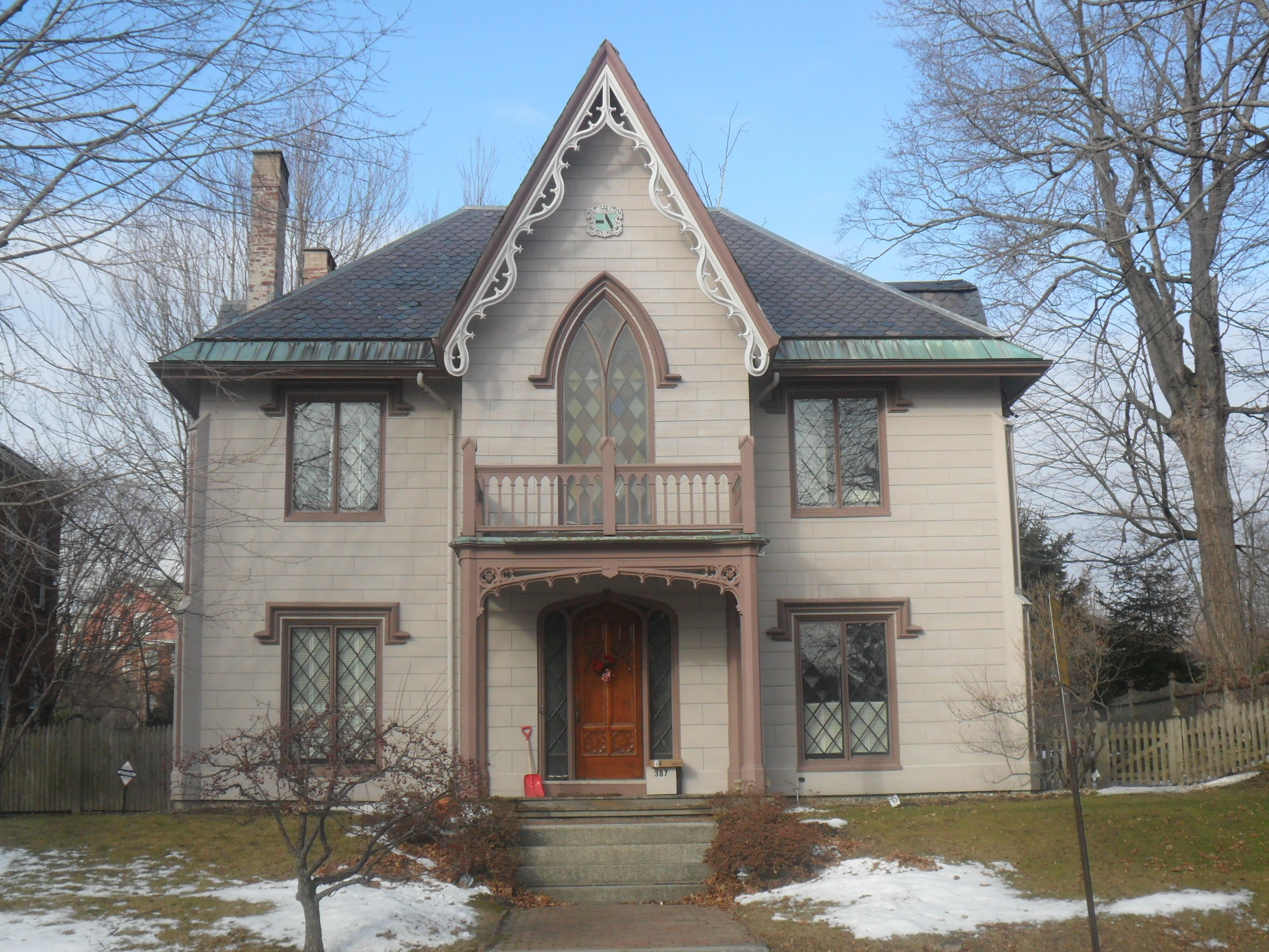
- The Gothic House in December 2010

- Location within Maine Location within the United States
- Interactive map showing the location of The Gothic House
- Location: 387 Spring St., Portland, Maine
- Coordinates: 43°38′45″N 70°16′21″W
- Area: 0.5 acres (0.20 ha)
- Built: 1845
- Architect: Henry Rowe
- Architectural style: Gothic Revival
- Part of: Spring Street Historic District (ID70000043)
- NRHP reference No.: 72001539

Significant dates
- Added to NRHP: December 31, 1974
- Designated CP: April 3, 1970

The Gothic House, also known as the John J. Brown House, is a historic house at 387 Spring Street in Portland, Maine. Built in 1845, it is one of Maine's finest and earliest known examples of Gothic Revival architecture. Although virtually unaltered, it was moved down Spring Street in 1971 to avoid demolition. It was listed on the National Register of Historic Places in 1974.

== Description and history ==
The Gothic House is located in Portland's West End neighborhood, on the north side of Spring Street, a short way east of the Western Cemetery. Spring Street is part of the Spring Street Historic District, a cluster of well-preserved 19th-century residences. The house is a two-story wood-frame structure with a hip roof, wooden siding that resembles rusticated stone, and a modern concrete foundation. The main (south-facing) facade is three bays wide, with a central projecting section housing the main entrance. Topped by a steeply pitched gable, that section has a two-pointed Gothic arched window on the second level and the entrance, sheltered by a Gothic-detailed porch on the first. Windows in the flanking bays are diamond-paned casement windows. The main gable in front and the smaller gables on the side elevations are all decorated with bargeboard trim.

The house was designed by Irish immigrant Henry Rowe (1812–1870), a major proponent of the Gothic Revival, and built in 1845. It is believed to be Rowe's first commission in the state, and is described in city promotional materials as the finest example of Gothic Revival architecture in Maine. The design is based partly on examples published in Andrew Jackson Downing's 1842 Cottage Residences. The house was originally located approximately a mile east of the present location, closer to the city's port area. As it was demolished in 1971, the structure was moved further down Spring Street, and a Holiday Inn hotel was constructed in the former location.

A bronze and brass Gothic chandelier that once hung in the house's parlor was on exhibit at the Metropolitan Museum of Art in New York City from April to September 1970.

== See also ==
- National Register of Historic Places listings in Portland, Maine
