= Thunderclap =

Thunderclap may refer to:

- Thunder, the sound caused by lightning

== Arts and entertainment ==
- In literature, a thunderclap is a figurative or literal device used to describe a sudden, shocking, and momentous event or revelation that completely disrupts a character's world or the narrative flow.
- Thunderclap (comics), a superhero created by Marvel UK, a division of Marvel Comics
- Thunderclap (memoir), 2024 book by Laura Cumming
- Thunderclap (website), a crowdspeaking platform
- Thunderclap Newman, a late 1960s rock band
- Thunderclap, a fictional town in The Dark Tower by Stephen King
- Thunderclap, a 1921 American drama film directed by Richard Stanton
- "Thunderclap", a song by Bang Camaro from Bang Camaro II
- Thunderclap, the main antagonist in the 2015 Disney/Pixar animated film The Good Dinosaur

== Other uses ==
- Thunder clap, a dance move
- Thunderclap headache, an intense headache that can be a sign of a medical emergency
- Thunderclap plan, a canceled German attack that was planned for August 1944
- The Delft Thunderclap, the 1654 explosion of the Delft gunpowder magazine
- Thunderclap (security vulnerability), related to computer flaws
- Viking Thunder Clap, a football chant

== See also ==
- Clap (disambiguation)
- Thunder (disambiguation)
- Thunderbolt (disambiguation)
