= CLAP =

CLAP may refer to:

- CLAP!... El lugar de tus sueños, a children's television series from Mexico
- Child Labour Programme of Action
- Local Committee for Supply and Production (CLAP), a government-sponsored food distribution program in Venezuela
- CLever Audio Plug-in, an audio effect software API

== See also ==
- Clap (disambiguation)
