= Dorchester Historical Society =

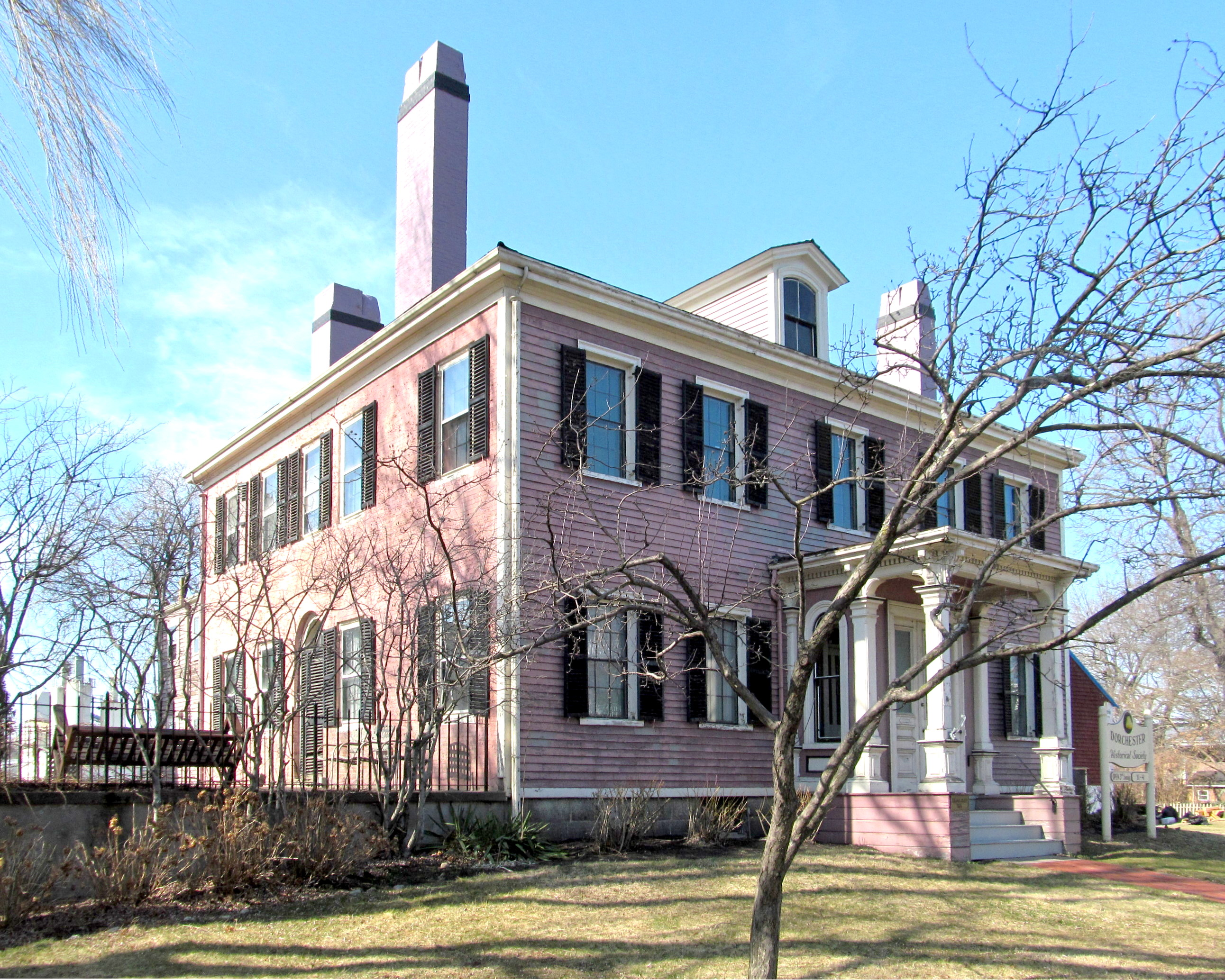
William Clapp House, headquarters of the Dorchester Historical Society

The Dorchester Historical Society is a non-profit historical society devoted to telling the history of Dorchester, Massachusetts since it was founded in 1630. The Dorchester Historical Society was "founded in 1843 and incorporated in 1891." The Historical Society is headquartered in the William Clapp House and also operates several other historic house museums in Dorchester, including the James Blake House (c.1661), and Captain Lemuel Clap House (Clapp Houses) which are open for tours on third Sunday of each month from 11 AM to 3 PM.

== See also ==
- List of historical societies in Massachusetts
