= Portland Fire Museum =

Fire museum in Portland, Maine

Coordinates: 43°39′07″N 70°15′50″W

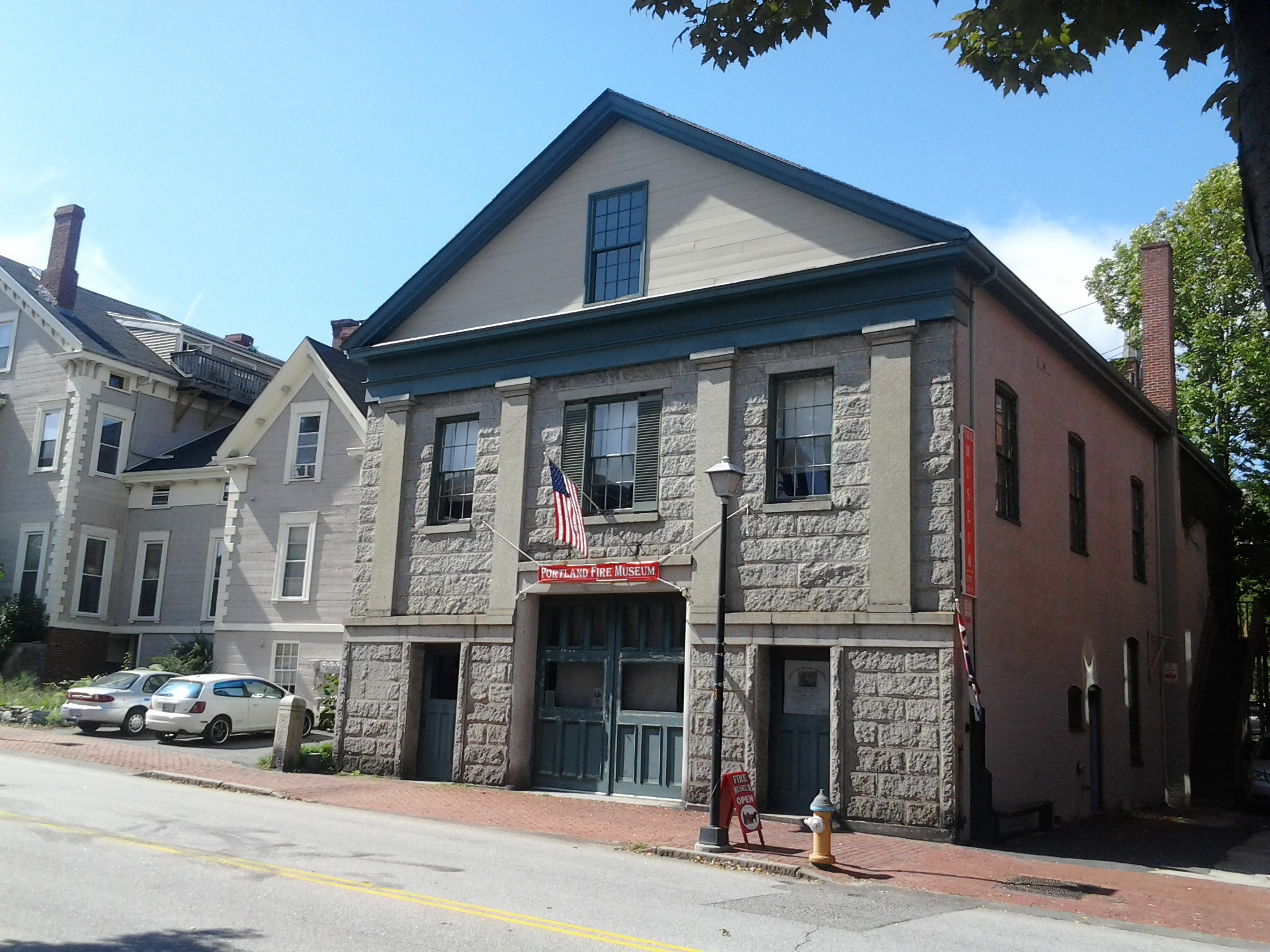
The Portland Fire Museum building in September 2011.

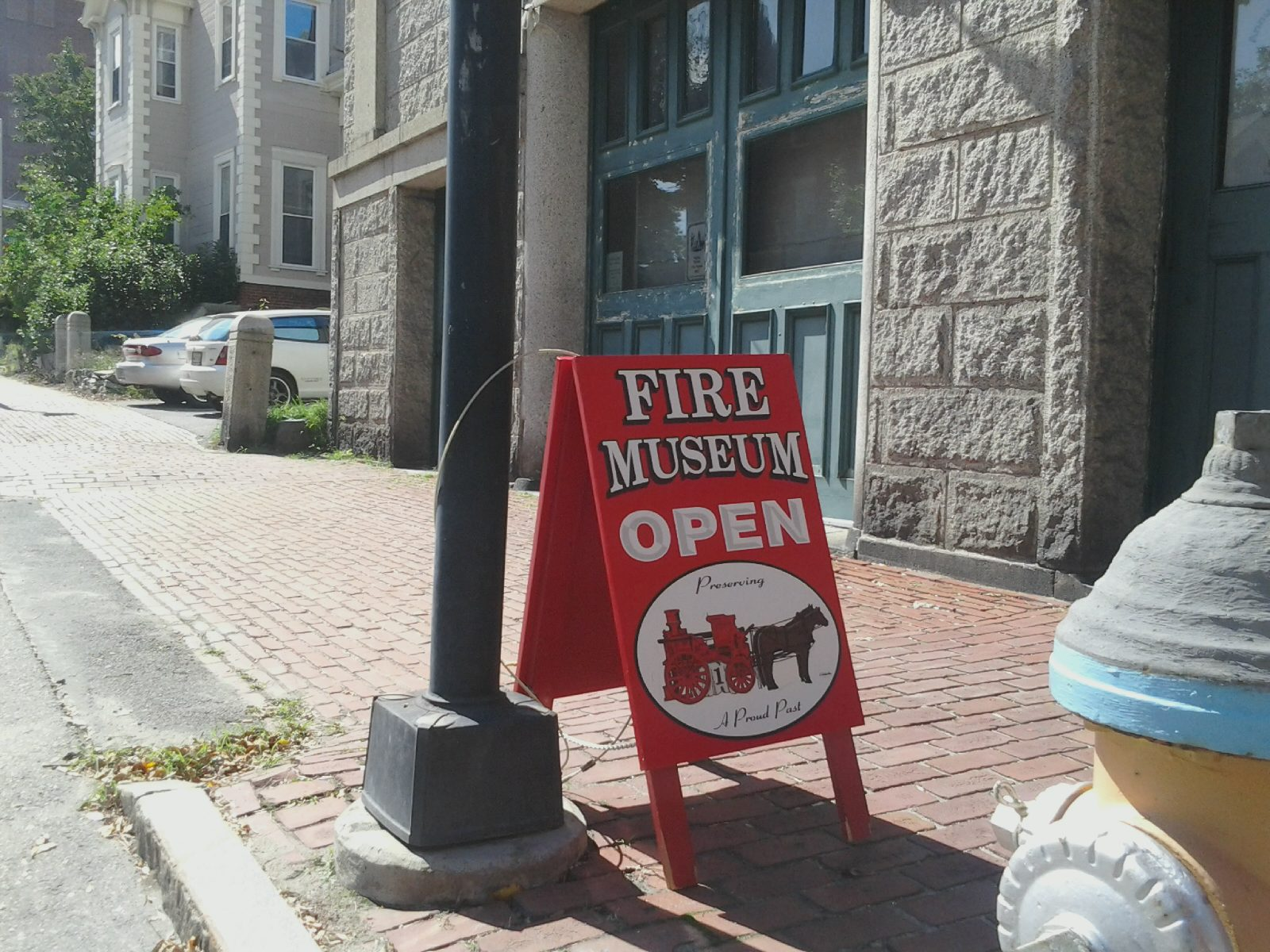

The Portland Fire Museum is a fire museum in Portland, Maine. Located at 157 Spring Street in the former home of Fire Engine 4, the museum is operated by the Portland Veteran Firemen's Association (PVFA). It showcases the history of firefighting in Portland, including a number of retired firetrucks. The PVFA was originally located at the headquarters of Casco Engine 1 which was located at 19 South Street across from what is now the Cumberland County Civic Center. The building at 19 South Street was demolished during the building of the Spring Street arterial and the PVFA moved west to the 157 Spring Street location.
