= James Blake House =

Oldest surviving house in Boston, Massachusetts

- U.S. National Register of Historic Places
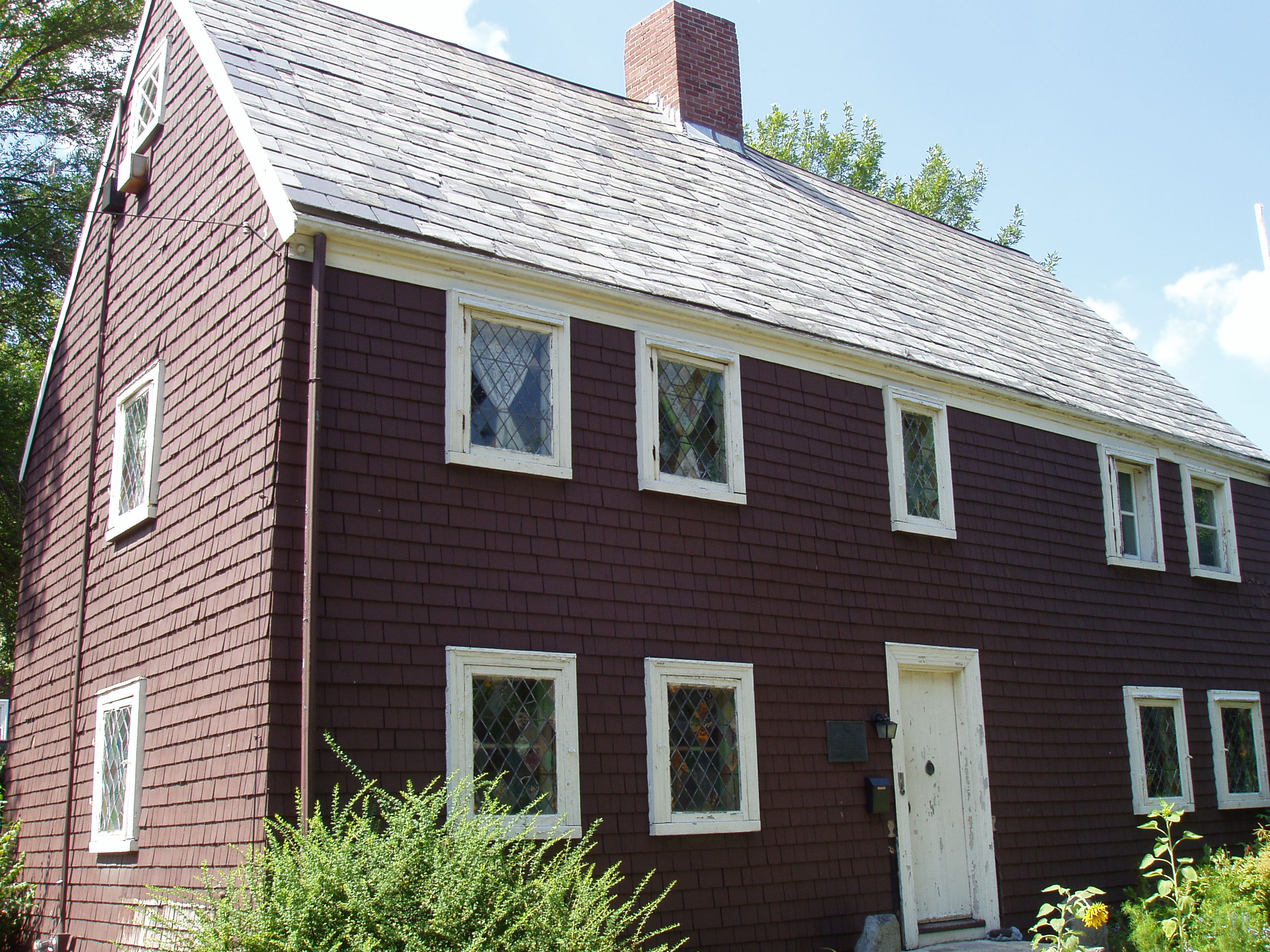

- Location within Massachusetts
- Location: Boston, MA
- Coordinates: 42°19′10.71″N 71°3′37.05″W
- Built: 1661
- NRHP reference No.: 74002350
- Added to NRHP: May 1, 1974

The James Blake House is the oldest surviving house in Boston, Massachusetts, United States. The house was built in 1661. It is located at 735 Columbia Road, in Edward Everett Square in Dorchester, Boston, just a block from Massachusetts Avenue. The Dorchester Historical Society now owns the building and tours are given on the third Sunday of the month.

== History ==
The house was built in 1661 and the date was confirmed by dendrochronology in 2007. It was built in a Western English style of post–medieval architecture by James Blake, an immigrant from England. The Blake family owned the house until 1825 when it was acquired by the Williams family. In 1891, the City of Boston acquired the house. In order to save the house from demolition in 1896, the Dorchester Historical Society acquired the property from the city and moved the house less than 500 feet from its original location by Massachusetts Avenue to its current location. In 1978, the interior and exterior of the house were designated as a Boston Landmark by the Boston Landmarks Commission.

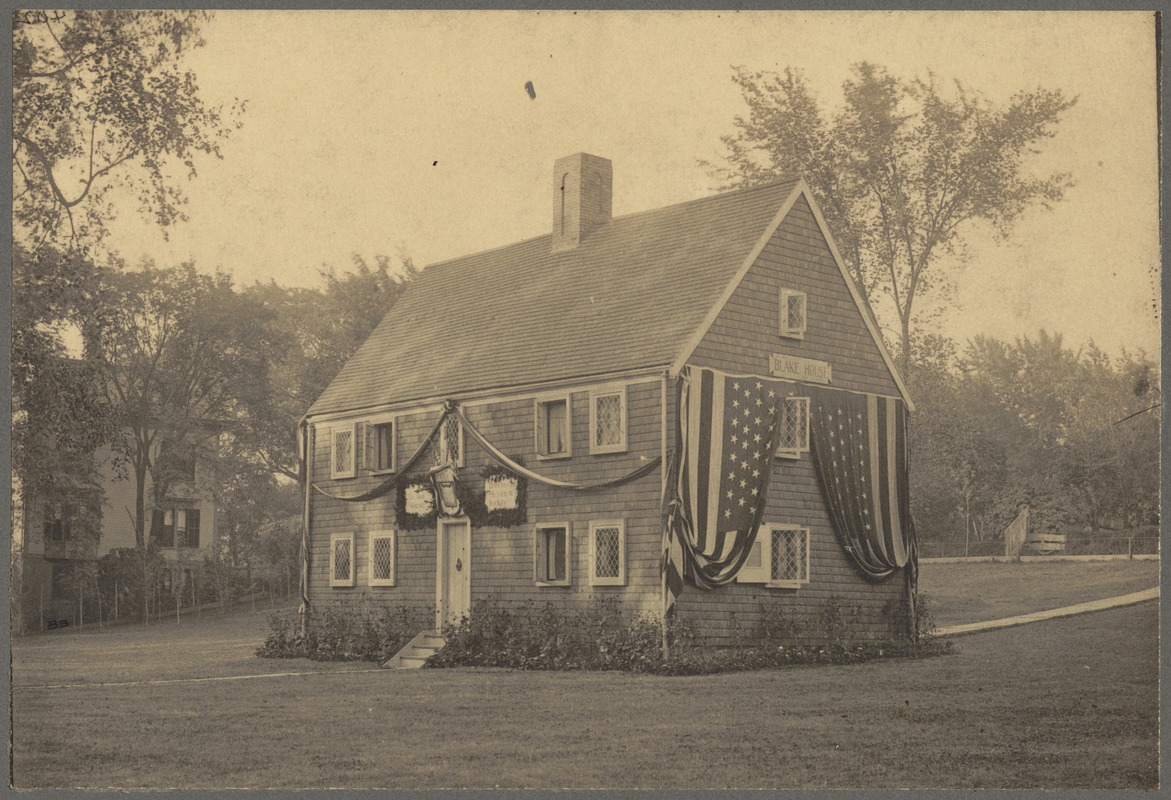
Exterior, 1898

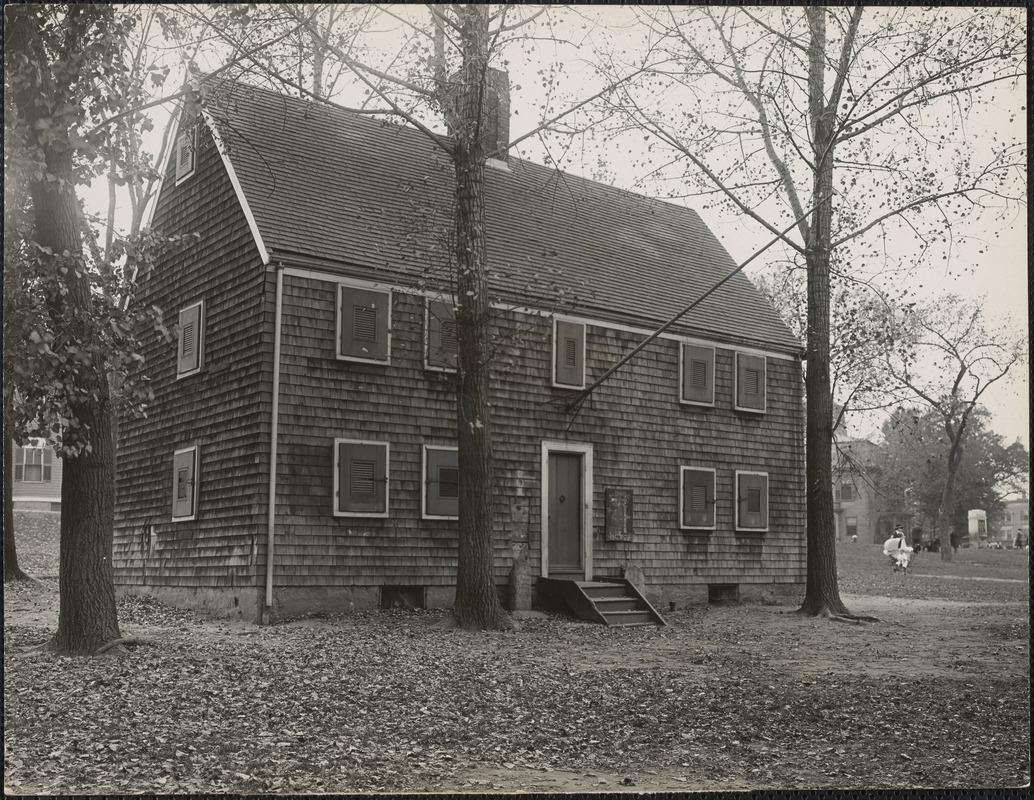
"Ye Olde Blake House," 1920

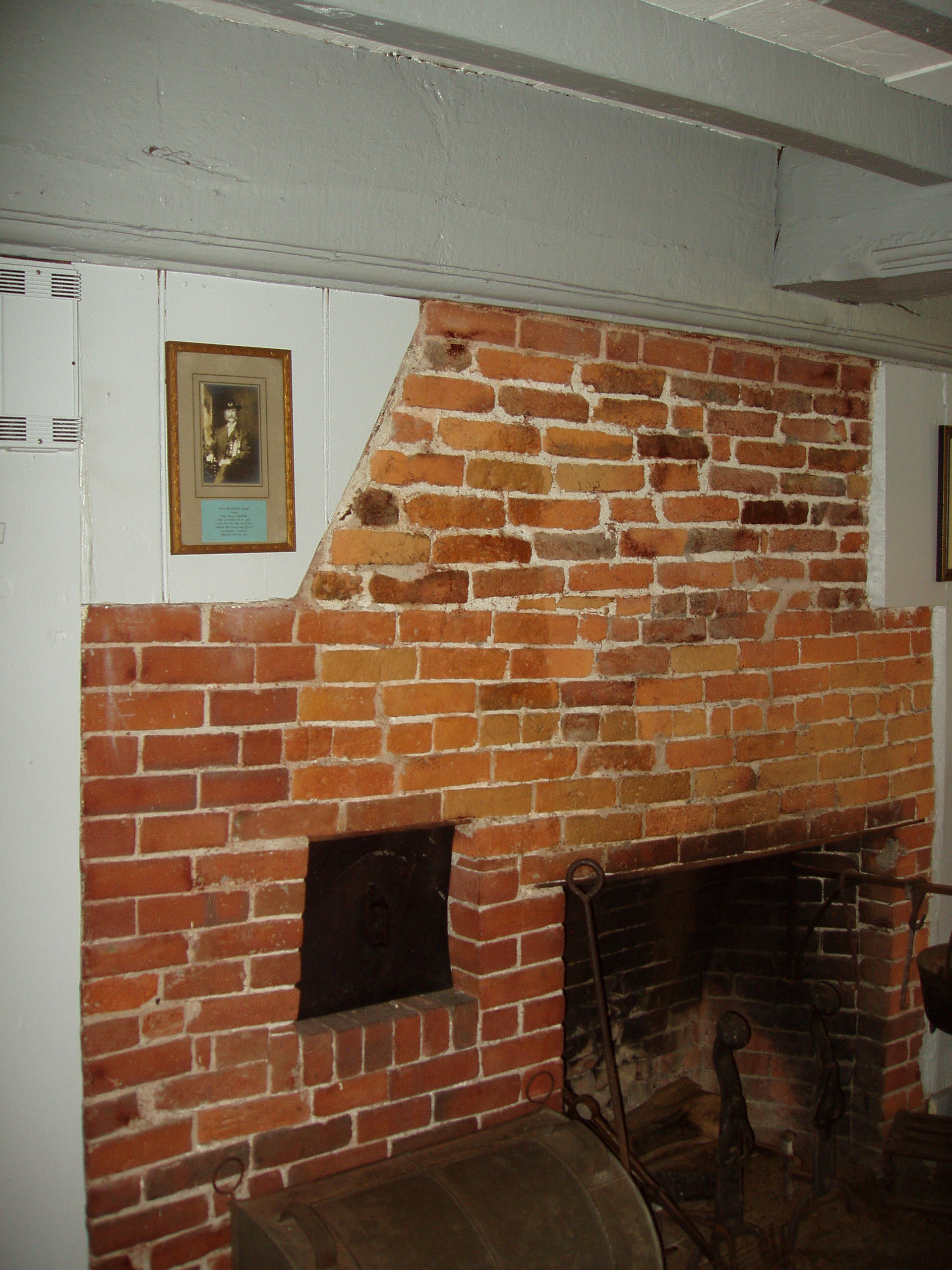
Interior

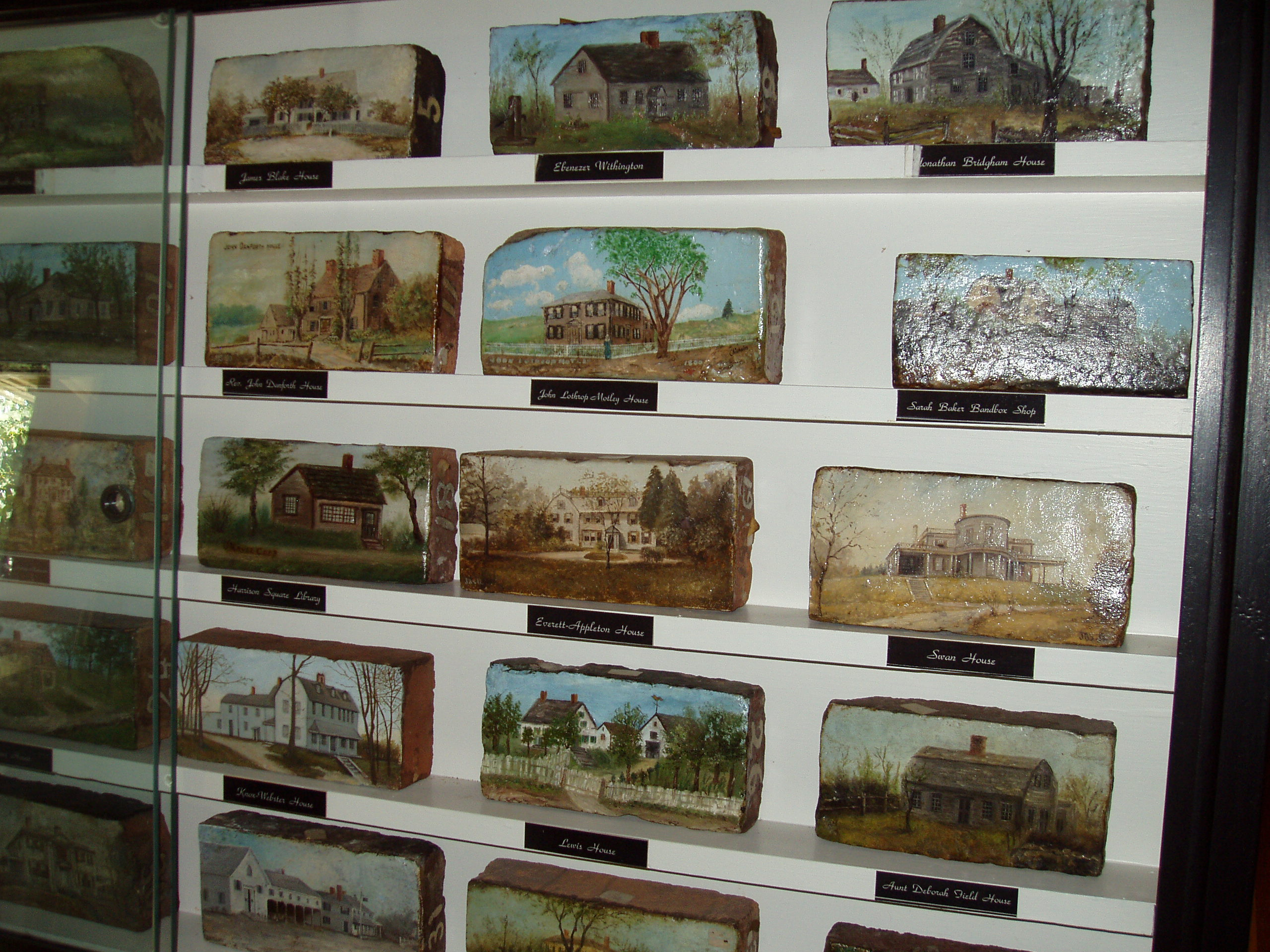
Edward A. Huebner brick collection

== See also ==
- List of the oldest buildings in Massachusetts
- National Register of Historic Places listings in southern Boston, Massachusetts
