= Klapper =

Klapper is a surname. Notable people with the surname include:

- Bonnie S. Klapper (born 1957), an American lawyer
- David Klapper, co-founder of Finish Line, Inc.
- Gilbert Klapper, a paleontologist
- Ilse von Klapper, wife of William S. Burroughs from 1937 to 1946
- John Klapper, British scholar
- Leora Klapper, an economist
- Melissa Klapper, American historian
- Paul Klapper (1885–1952), a Romanian-American educator
- Radu Klapper (1937–2006), an Israeli-Romanian poet and author

== See also ==
- Klapper Hall, an early building at City College of New York

== See also ==
- Klapp
