= Printers' Exchange Block =

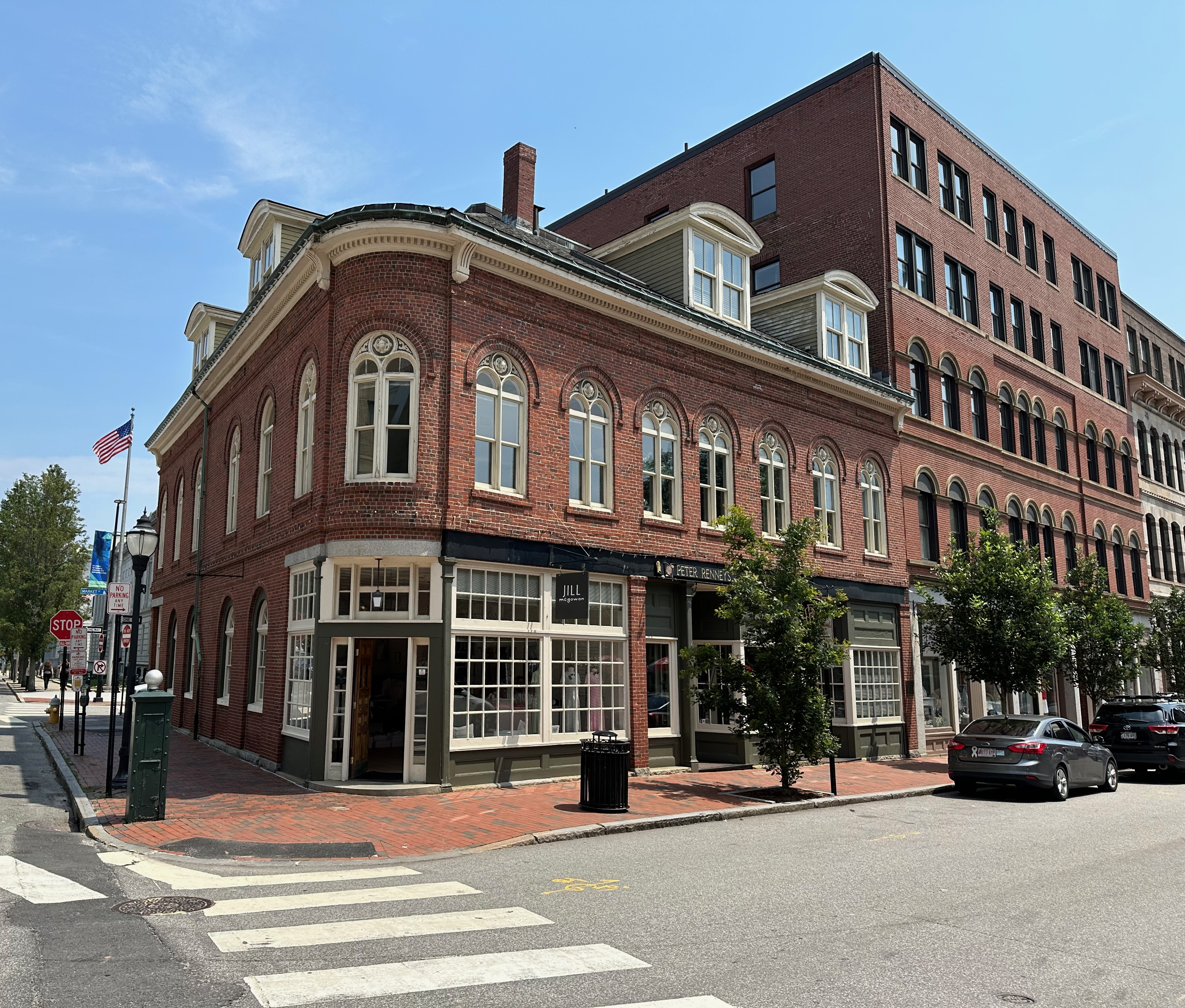
- The building in 2023, viewed from Exchange and Federal Streets
- Interactive map of the Printers' Exchange Block area

General information
- Location: Portland, Maine, U.S., 103–107 Exchange Street
- Coordinates: 43.65857°N 70.25578°W
- Completed: 1866 (160 years ago)

Technical details
- Floor count: 2.5

Design and construction
- Architect: Charles Q. Clapp

The Printers' Exchange Block is a historic commercial building located at 103–107 Exchange Street in the Old Port of Portland, Maine. The building, which was designed in 1866 by Charles Q. Clapp, was built the same year. It wraps around the block that stands at the intersections of Exchange, Federal and Market Streets. Its alternative addresses have been given as 174–178 Federal Street and 114–116 Market Street during its history.

== Description and history ==
The block was built by Horatio N. Jose in 1866, in the wake of Portland's great 1866 fire, to Charles Q. Clapp's design. Deacon Brown Thurston moved his business here after his previous one, at the corner of Fore Street and Union Street, burned.

The building was originally known as the Printers' Exchange, and was the home of the Eastern Argus and the Portland Daily Press, among other newspapers. In 1924, the building was owned by Clinton W. Davis Agent. By 1965, it was the home of Dow and Pinkham Insurance Company.

== Interior ==
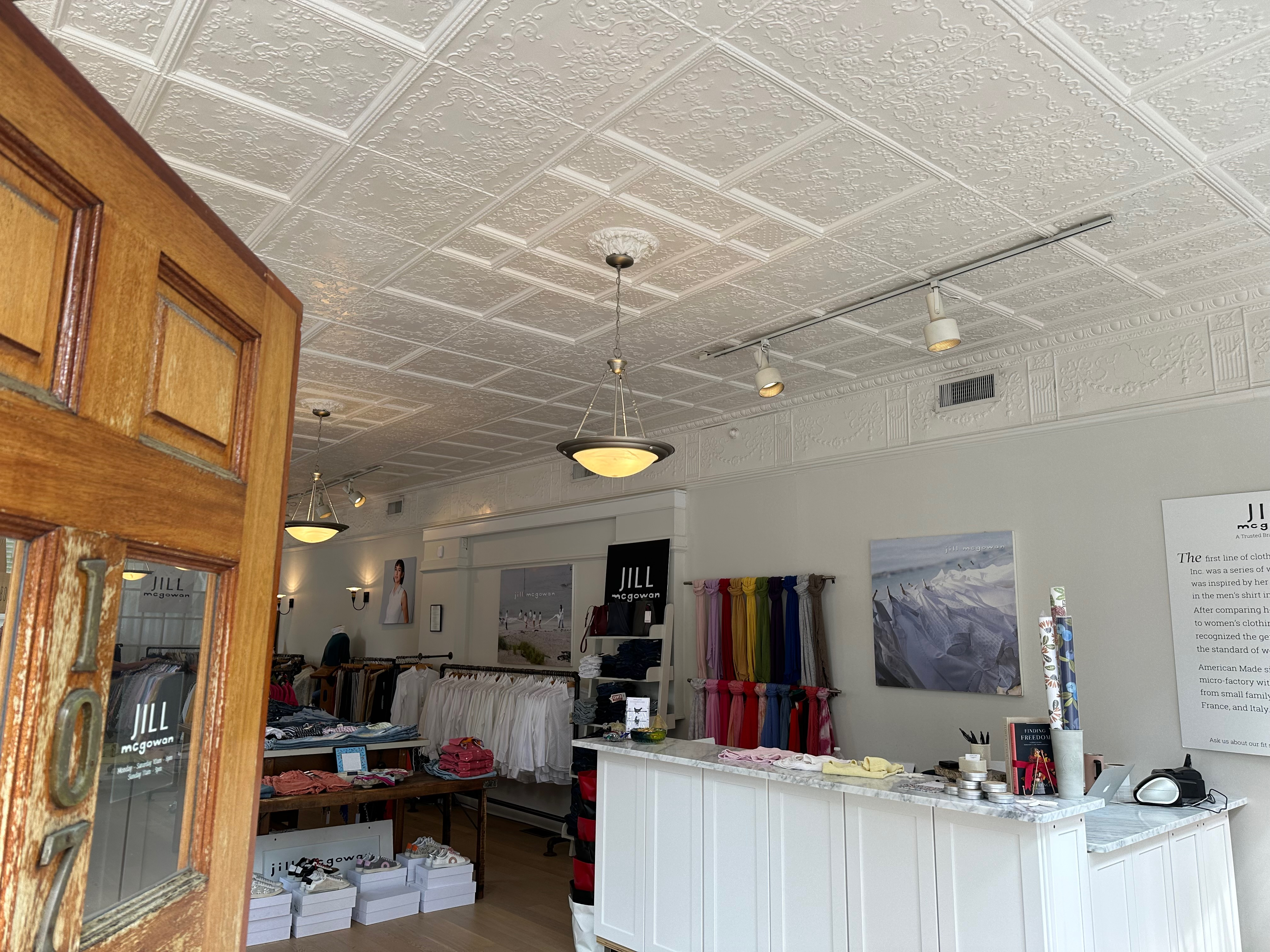
