= Charles Q. Clapp =

American architect

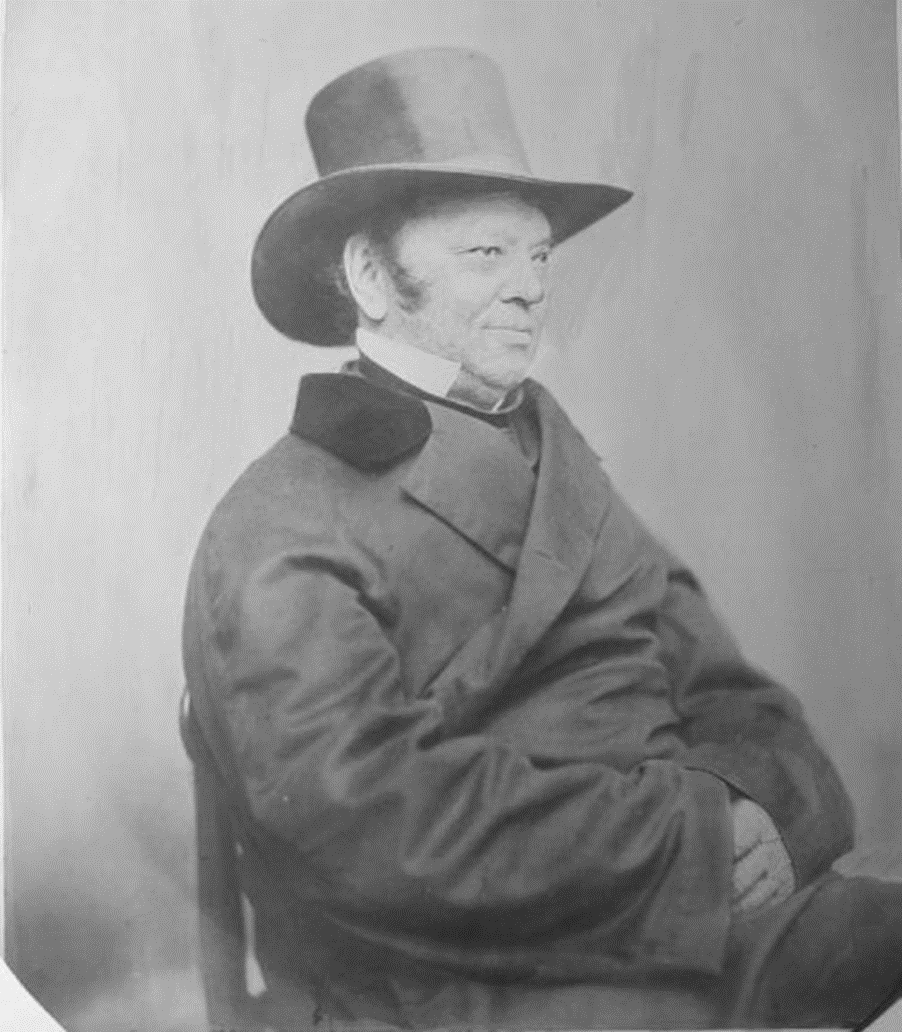
- Clapp pictured around 1865
- Born: May 26, 1799; Portland, District of Maine, Massachusetts, U.S.
- Died: March 1, 1868 (aged 68)
- Occupation: Architect
- Buildings: Charles Q. Clapp House; Charles Q. Clapp Block; Printers' Exchange Block

Charles Quincy Clapp (May 26, 1799 – March 1, 1868) was an American merchant and architect in Portland, Maine. He was active in the first half of the 19th century.

== Early life ==
Clapp was born in Portland, Maine, as the second known child of Asa Godfrey Clapp and Elizabeth Wendell Quincy. His younger brother, Asa Jr., became a United States representative.

== Career ==
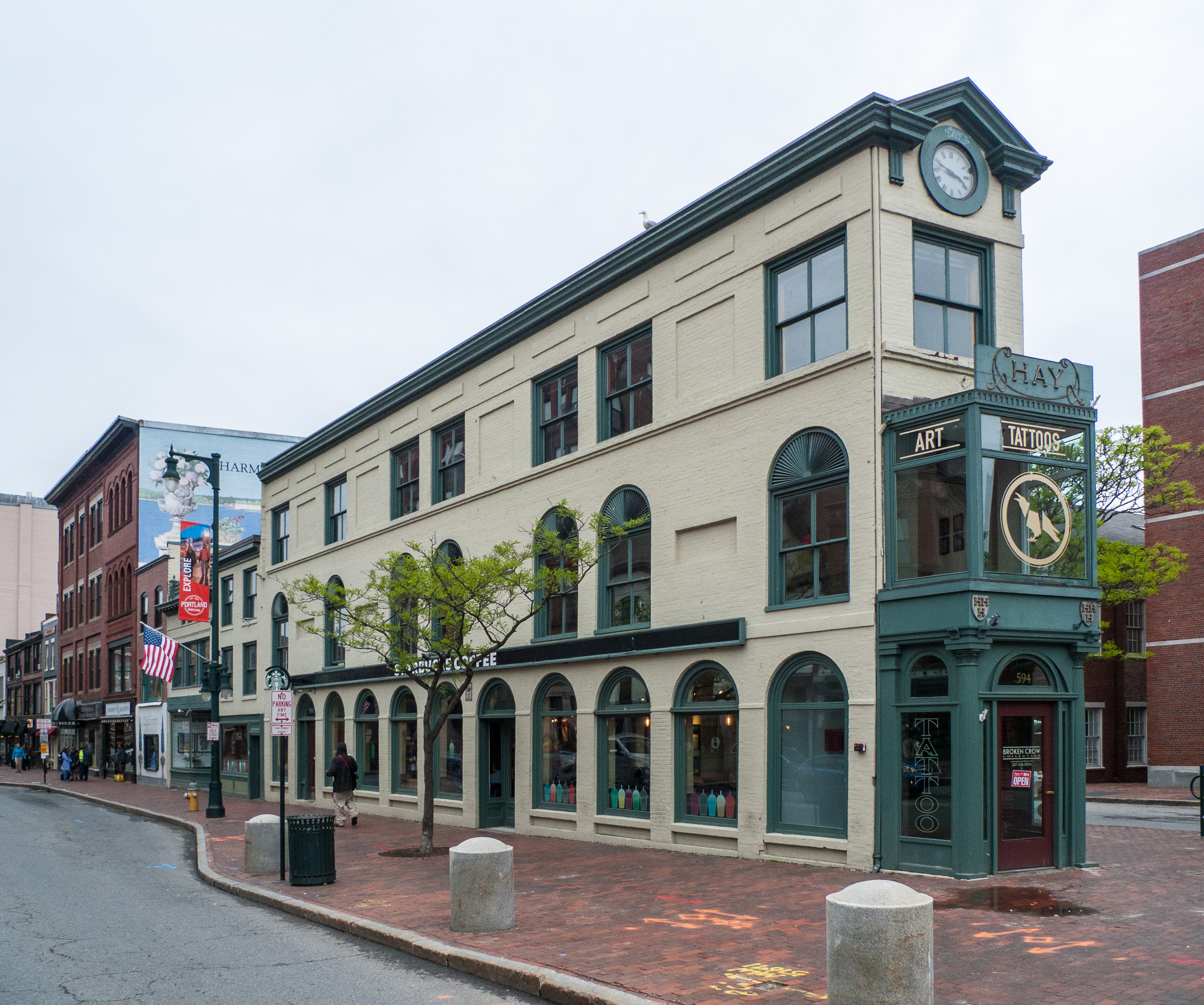
The Hay Building in Portland, Maine, which is also known as the Charles Q. Clapp Block

Fourteen of Clapp's designs were lost in the 1866 great fire of Portland. By October of that year, he had eleven brick buildings in the process of construction.

=== Selected notable works ===
- Charles Q. Clapp Block (Hay Building, original two storeys; 1826)
- Portland Exchange Coffee House (1828) - lost in Portland's fire of 1866
- Charles Q. Clapp House (1832)
- Park Place, Park Street (1848)
- Printers' Exchange Block (1866)
- 373 Fore Street (the home of Bull Feeney's as of 2022)

== Personal life ==
Clapp married Julia Octavia Wingate, granddaughter of General Henry Dearborn, in the early 1820s. His father gave the newlyweds the former Hugh McLellan House, at the corner of Portland's Spring Street and High Street, as a wedding gift. The couple had two known children: daughters Julia and Georgianna. Julia married John Carroll. They lived adjacent to Victoria Mansion, on Park Street. Julia died in 1893; she is interred in Portland's Evergreen Cemetery.

In 1832, Clapp designed and built his home at today's 97 Spring Street in Portland, having sold the adjacent McLellan House to his father-in-law. What is known as the Charles Q. Clapp House is now owned by the Portland Museum of Art. It was listed on the National Register of Historic Places in 1972. The Clapps only lived in the new structure for a few years: in 1837, they returned to the McLellan House to live with Julia's widowed mother.

== Death ==
Clapp died in 1868, aged 68. He is interred in Portland's Eastern Cemetery. His wife survived him by nine years; she died on February 13, 1877.
