= Charles Q. Clapp House =

Historic house in Maine, United States

- U.S. National Register of Historic Places
- U.S. Historic district – Contributing property
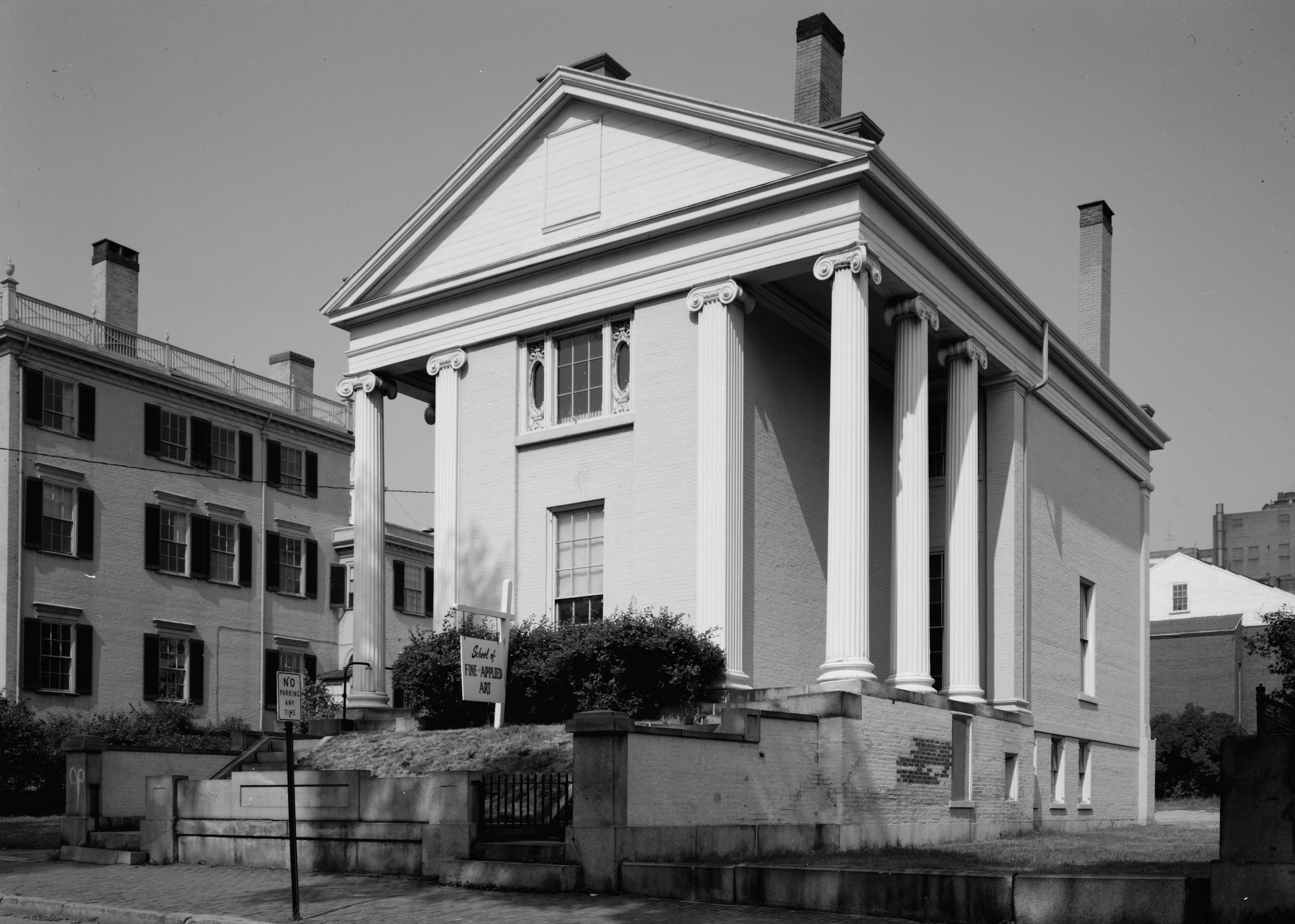
- Front of the Charles Q. Clapp House, HABS photo, 1965

- Location within Maine Location within the United States
- Location: 97 Spring Street, Portland, Maine
- Coordinates: 43°39′13″N 70°15′42″W
- Area: 0.3 acres (0.12 ha)
- Built: 1832
- Architect: Charles Q. Clapp
- Architectural style: Greek Revival
- Part of: Spring Street Historic District (ID70000043)
- NRHP reference No.: 72000072

Significant dates
- Added to NRHP: February 23, 1972
- Designated CP: April 3, 1970

The Charles Q. Clapp House is a historic house at 97 Spring Street in central Portland, Maine. Built in 1832, it is one of Maine's important early examples of high style Greek Revival architecture. Probably designed by its first owner, Charles Q. Clapp, it served for much of the 20th century as the home of the Portland School of Fine and Applied Art, now the Maine College of Art. It is now owned by the adjacent Portland Museum of Art. It was listed on the National Register of Historic Places in 1972.

== Description and history ==
The Clapp House is located on the north side of Spring Street in Downtown Portland, behind the main bulk of the Portland Museum of Art (PMA) and immediately adjacent to the McLellan-Sweat Mansion, a National Historic Landmark that is also part of the museum complex. The house is two stories tall, with brick walls set on a raised granite foundation, and capped by a wood-frame gabled roof. Its front facade faces south, and is divided into three bays, with fluted Ionic columns at the outside and fluted Ionic pilasters framing the center bay. The center bay has a large sash window on the first floor, set in a recessed rectangular panel, with a smaller three-part window on the second floor characterized by its flanking oval windows with elaborately carved surrounds. The side elevations each have a recessed porch supported by three Ionic columns, with colored tile floors laid in geometric patterns. Each porch is accessed via a separate granite stair leading to it on the main facade.

The house was built in 1832, and was probably designed by Charles Q. Clapp, its first owner. Clapp was the son of Asa Clapp, who was one of Portland's wealthiest businessmen. Charles was engaged in real estate development in the city. Some of the designs on the inside and outside of the house are traceable to popular works describing Greek Revival style, including Asher Benjamin's The Practical House Carpenter and Edward Shaw's Civil Architecture. In addition to this house, Clapp is credited with making Greek Revival alterations to the McLellan-Sweat Mansion (which he lived in during the 1820s), and for construction of the Charles Q. Clapp Block, one of Portland's oldest surviving commercial buildings.

The house was owned in the 1860s by Portland mayor Augustus Stevens, and survived the city's devastating 1866 fire. In the aftermath, bank and city records were stored here, and it is probable that city business was also conducted here, the city hall having been one of the fire's casualties. In 1914, the building was acquired by the Portland Society of Art, and converted for use as an educational facility with design assistance by John Calvin Stevens. In 1982, the society was disbanded, dividing its assets between PMA and what is now the Maine College of Art (MECA). MECA continued to use the building until the 1990s, when MECA moved to other quarters downtown. The building ownership then reverted to the PMA.

== See also ==
- National Register of Historic Places listings in Portland, Maine
