= Clap Clap =

Clap Clap may refer to:

- "Clap Clap" (Gran Error, Elvana Gjata and Antonia song), 2022
- "Clap Clap" (NiziU song), 2022
- Clap! Clap!, the stage name of Italian musician Cristiano Crisci
