= Clapper (service) =

American social network for short videos

- Initial release: July 2020; 5 years ago
- Operating system: Android, iOS
- Type: Video sharing
- License: Proprietary software
- Website: www.clapperapp.com

Clapper is an American short-form video-hosting service headquartered in Dallas, Texas. It was founded in 2020 by Edison Chen as an alternative for TikTok for mature audiences. The app is functionally similar to TikTok and includes tipping and e-commerce features.

Following an influx of far-right content in early 2021, Clapper strengthened its moderation practices. It achieved 2 million monthly active users by 2023, and the number of downloads increased after a U.S. bill that would potentially ban TikTok in the country was signed in 2024.

== History ==
With its offices in Dallas, Texas, Clapper was founded in July 2020 by Chinese-American entrepreneur Edison Chen. Chen considered that most online platforms, such as TikTok, were being targeted to young generations, such as Generation Z. He then concepted Clapper as a service with short-form content for mature audiences among Generation X and millennials, while not intending to compete directly with TikTok. Clapper averaged fewer than ten thousand daily active users during 2020, reaching 500 thousand downloads in the next year. Initially without paying for external advertising, the company raised about $3 million during a 2021 seed funding round.

In 2023, the app reportedly reached about 300 to 400 thousand daily active users and 2 million monthly active users. The average user was between the ages of 35 and 55. Following the April 2024 signing of the Protecting Americans from Foreign Adversary Controlled Applications Act, which would potentially enact a ban on TikTok in the U.S. in January 2025, Clapper averaged 200 thousand weekly downloads. In 2025, before the day scheduled for the ban (January 19), TikTok users migrated to other apps. As a result, Clapper received 1.4 million new downloads in a week preceding the date. It was listed as the third most-downloaded free app on Apple's App Store on January 14, behind Xiaohongshu and Lemon8, and the term "TikTok refugee" became a trending term.

== Features ==
Clapper presents similarities with TikTok in its layout, including "Following" and "For You" tabs with videos up to three minutes long that can be liked, commented on or shared. A "Clapback" feature allows users to create responses to videos from others. Users can create livestreams and chat rooms in the app.

Users can tip Clapper creators through its Clapper Fam monetization feature, in place of in-app advertisements. The Clapper Shop allows for e-commerce between users. The service had distributed $10 million to its users in total by 2023, according to Clapper CEO Chen.

== Content ==
Clapper includes a policy requiring users to be at least 17 years of age, although Clapper CEO Chen described that "there is no adult content" on the platform. Lindsay Dodgson of Business Insider described the content as generally outdated and "reminiscent of 'getting owned' compilations of the earlier internet." The Washington Post's Tatum Hunter characterized Clapper as including sexual or engagement baiting content more prevalently than TikTok.

=== Moderation ===
Clapper's team, which had fifteen employees in early 2021, initially stated it would not moderate content as strictly as TikTok and would mostly rely on user reports. Following that year's January 6 United States Capitol attack, far-right conservative videos promoting QAnon and anti-vaccine conspiracy theories appeared on Clapper's "For You" page to a substantial degree for weeks. The videos were made in protest against decisions by platforms, particularly TikTok, to ban such content.

Clapper's team stated in January 10 that its rules prohibiting incitements to violence would be strictly enforced. By February, videos and accounts promoting the conspiracy theories had been removed, and QAnon-related content was banned permanently. Clapper's team hired more content auditors and implemented moderation by artificial intelligence for further community guideline violations.
