= George Clapp House =

Historic house in Massachusetts, United States

- U.S. National Register of Historic Places
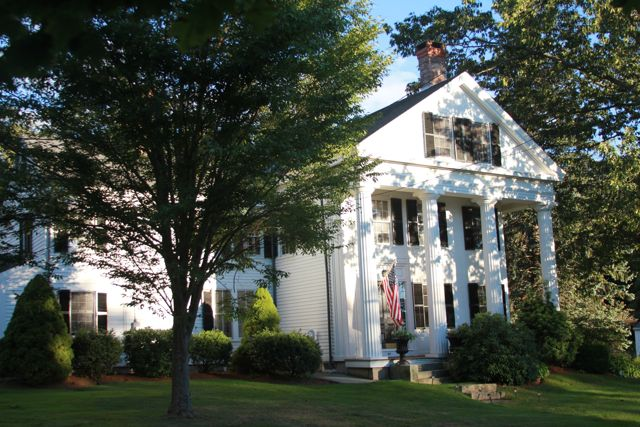

- Location within Massachusetts Location within the United States
- Location: 44 North St., Grafton, Massachusetts
- Coordinates: 42°12′43″N 71°40′51″W
- Built: 1835
- Architect: Clapp, George
- Architectural style: Greek Revival
- NRHP reference No.: 97000919
- Added to NRHP: August 21, 1997

The George Clapp House is a historic house at 44 North Street in Grafton, Massachusetts. Built about 1835, it is the town's only significant example of high-style Greek Revival architecture, with temple treatment on both the front and one side. The house was listed on the National Register of Historic Places on August 21, 1997.

== Description and history ==
The Clapp House is located in central Grafton, a short way northeast of the town center, at the northeast corner of North Street and Merriam Road. It is a 2 1/2-story wood-frame structure, three bays wide and five deep, with a front-facing gable roof, finished with flushboarding on the west (front) and south sides, and clapboard siding elsewhere. Its high-style Greek Revival treatment consists of four fluted Doric columns supporting an entablature and the fully pedimented gable in front, and six extending in a colonnade on the south side. A pair of sash windows are set in the center of the gable end. The front facade behind the columns has original tall windows on both floors, with the entrance set in the leftmost bay. The building is joined to a 19th-century barn by a series of ells. The interior retains most of its original finish and hardware, including small fireplaces, ceramic doorknobs, and wide pine flooring.

The house was built c. 1835 by George Clapp, a locally prominent builder of Greek Revival houses. It is the only high-style building of its type in Grafton. Clapp has been attributed with the construction of at least seven other Greek Revival houses, mainly near his first Grafton home on South Street. Clapp's family resided in this house until 1845.

== See also ==
- National Register of Historic Places listings in Worcester County, Massachusetts
