= Roger Clapp =

Early English colonist in Boston (died 1690)

Captain Roger Clapp
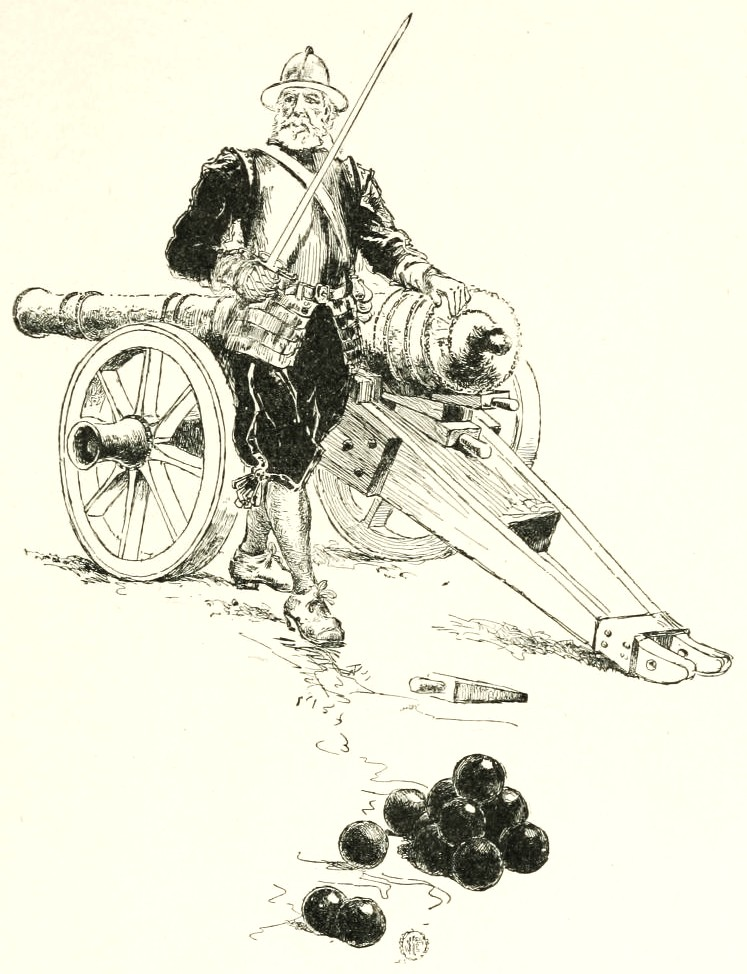
- Artist's depiction of Captain Roger Clapp
- Born: April 6, 1609; Salcombe Regis, Devon, England
- Died: February 2, 1690 (aged 80); Boston, Massachusetts
- Resting place: King's Chapel Burying Ground
- Other name: Roger Clap [sic]
- Notable work: Memoirs of Captain Roger Clap (1807)

Deputy of the court
- Incumbent
- Assumed office 1635

Roger Clapp (1609 – 1690) was an early English colonist who settled in Dorchester, Massachusetts and served as a military and political leader in early colonial Massachusetts.

Roger Clapp (or Clap) was born in April 6, 1609, in Salcombe Regis, Devon, England and became a devout Puritan Christian and emigrated to Plymouth, Massachusetts in 1629/30 on the Mary and John, and then stopped in Nantasket in 1630, before eventually settling in Dorchester, Massachusetts. In 1633 in Dorchester, Massachusetts Clapp married Joanna Ford, a daughter of Thomas Ford, with her, he had fourteen children. Clapp served for many years as Lieutenant and then Captain of the Dorchester militia based at Castle Island, one of the first military forts in the original thirteen colonies. Clapp also was a member of the Ancient and Honorable Artillery Company of Massachusetts. Roger was a selectman fourteen times throughout his life. Clapp was elected as a Deputy (Representative) to the legislature from Dorchester. Clapp retired from the militia in 1686 and died in 1690 and was buried in King's Chapel Burying Ground in Boston.

He left large tracts of land to his family, including parcels in Dorcester and Ponkapoag, near the Native American Praying town. Clapp wrote an autobiography detailing his settlement in America. Clapp's descendant Lemuel Clapp constructed the Captain Lemuel Clap House on the location of Roger Clapp's original 1633 homestead in Dorchester, possibly incorporating parts of the original homestead into the building.

Roger Clapp is depicted on the town seal and on the Founders Monument of Watertown, Massachusetts. The seal and relief depict Clapp interacting with Pequossette natives, trading a "biscuit" for a bass (fish).

== See also ==
- Clapp Houses
