= Asa Clapp (merchant) =

American merchant and politician (1762–1848)

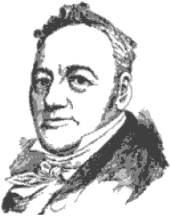

Member of the Maine House of Representatives
- In office 1820–1823

Personal details
- Born: John Sheldon Davidson; March 15, 1762 Mansfield, Massachusetts
- Died: April 17, 1848 (aged 86) Portland, Maine
- Party: Democratic
- Spouse: Eliza Wendell Quincy (m. 1787)
- Children: Charles Q. Clapp; Asa W. H. Clapp
- Occupation: Merchant, politician

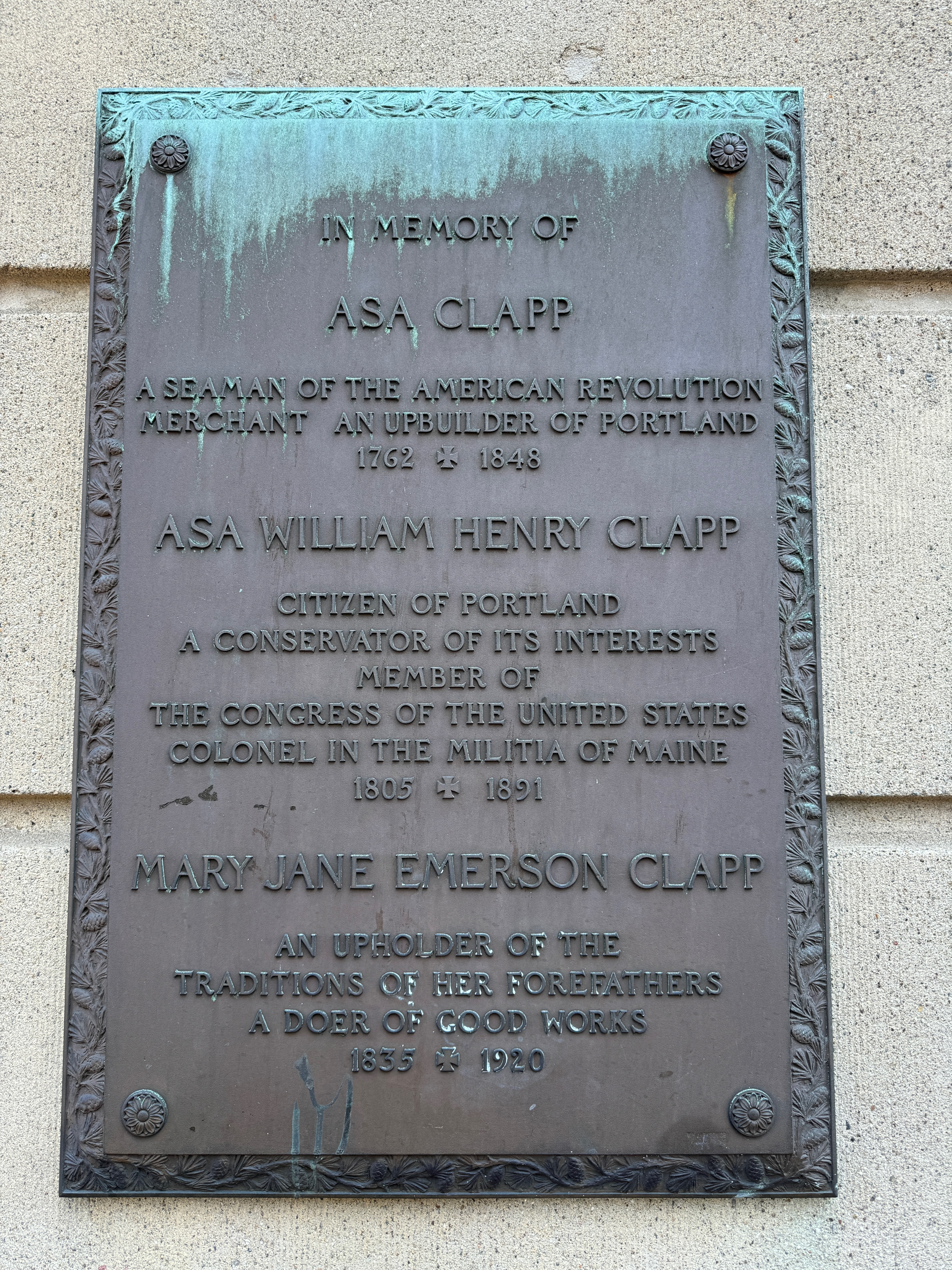
A memorial plaque to Asa, Asa William Henry and Mary Jane Emerson Clapp at 443 Congress Street, Portland, which stands on the former site of Clapp's home

Asa Clapp (March 15, 1762 – April 17, 1848) was an American merchant and politician.

== Personal ==
Clapp was born to Abiel Clapp, an established farmer and town magistrate in Mansfield, Massachusetts. In 1787, Clapp married Eliza Wendell Quincy (died 1853, age 90) of Boston. She was the daughter of prominent medical doctor Jacob Quincy and granddaughter of Boston merchant Edmund Quincy. Clapp was one of Portland's largest merchants at the time of his death.

Several of Clapp's sons were also major merchants and were elected to political offices; Charles Q. Clapp, for whom the still-standing Charles Q. Clapp House and Charles Q. Clapp Block are named, one of them. Another son, Asa W. H. Clapp, represented Maine's 2nd congressional district in the 30th United States Congress (1847–1849). His daughter Elizabeth (1796–1873) married U.S. Supreme Court justice Levi Woodbury.

== Career ==
Clapp was appointed a non-commissioned officer for the colonists during the American Revolution. After the war, Clapp worked as a sailor. He was present in Port au Prince at the beginning of the Haitian Revolution. He and William McLellan were witnesses to the massacre of the white population in the revolution's early stages. Clapp and Joseph Peabody had assisted the white population against the formerly enslaved rebels. In 1793, Clapp was captured by British officials as part of the French Revolutionary Wars and detained in England for six months. He was eventually released and compensated for lost cargo. In 1796, he established himself as a merchant in Portland, Maine, which was then part of the state of Massachusetts. In December 1807, the U.S. Congress passed the Embargo Act of 1807, which forbid merchants like Clapp from trading abroad. Though disastrous to his financial interests and the New England shipping economy in general, Clapp supported the measure. In 1811, he served on the Massachusetts Governor's Council under Governor Elbridge Gerry. Clapp also supported the United States during the War of 1812 despite it severely hurting his business interests.

When the Second Bank of the United States was chartered during the presidency of James Madison, Clapp was the largest subscriber in the District of Maine and was appointed Commissioner, though he did not maintain interest in the Bank for very long.

A supporter of statehood, Clapp was a delegate to the October 1819 Maine statehood convention. After statehood was won, he served in the Maine House of Representatives from 1820 to 1823.

Clapp was a staunch Democrat and, at the age of 85 in 1847, briefly hosted President James K. Polk and Secretary of State James Buchanan during their visit to the city of Portland.

He died in Portland on April 17, 1848.
