= Clapper Post =

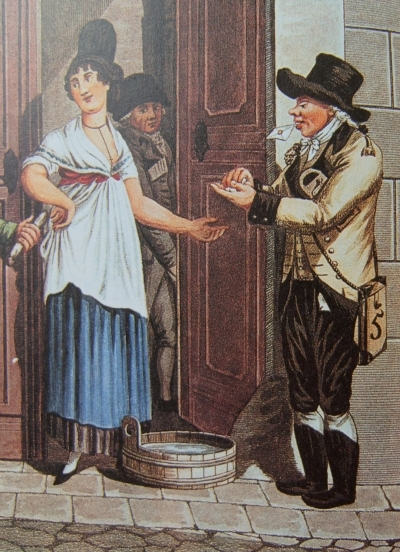
A seller and a clapper mailman (Vienna types around 1820)

Clapper Post, or Klapperpost in German, was an urban postal service in Vienna, the capital of Austria, and in some of the country's other cities, that began in 1772. Its name refers to a clapper (a type of rattle) with which mail carriers announced their arrival. In Vienna, it existed for more than ten years.

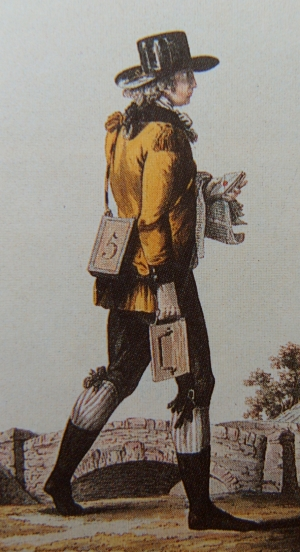
Clapper mailman (engraving; late 18th century)

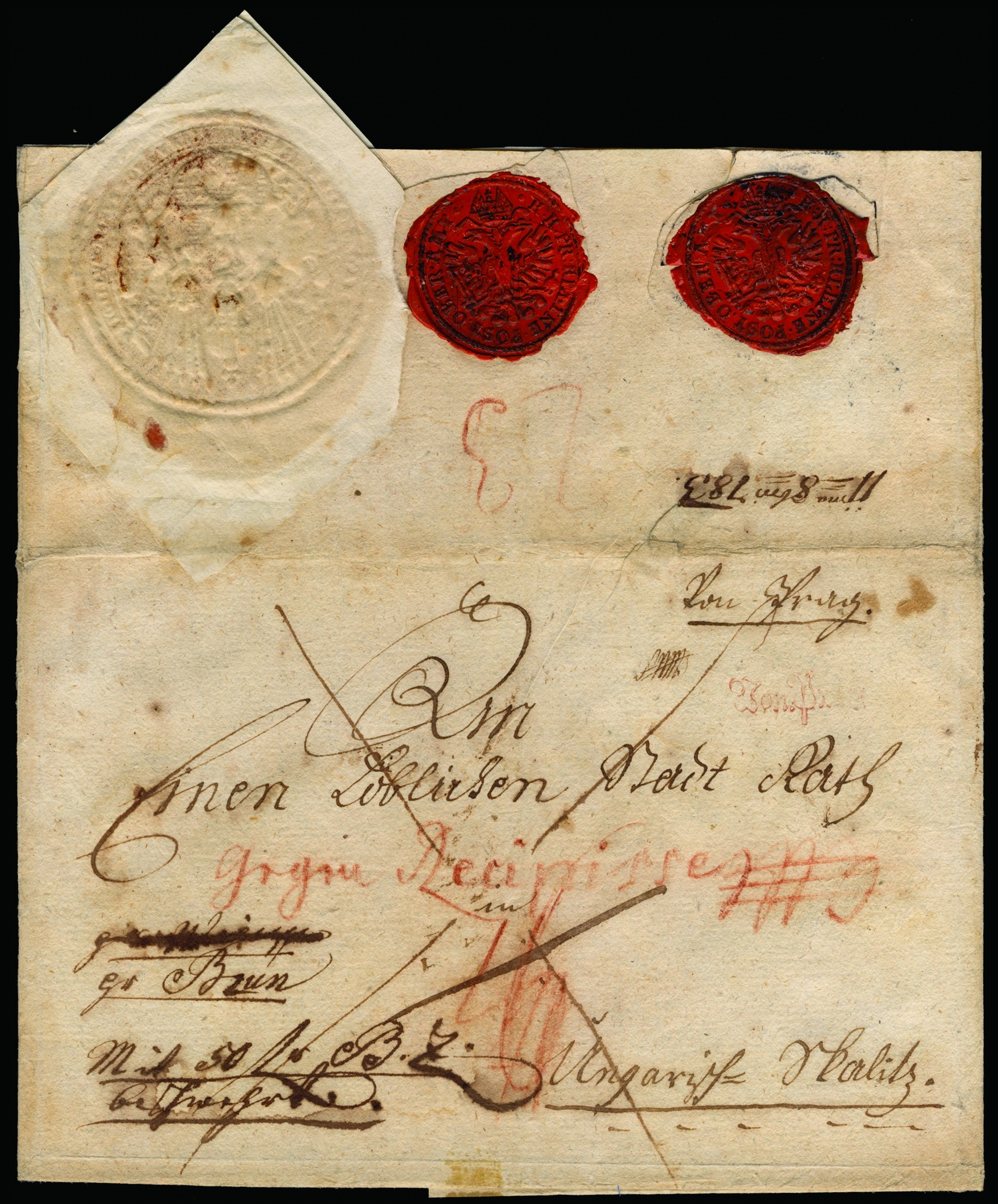
A unique money letter with 50 florins in banknotes from Prague to the town councillors of Hungarian Skalitz (in today's Slovak Republic; 1783)
