= Spring Street Historic District =

Historic district in Maine, United States

- U.S. National Register of Historic Places
- U.S. Historic district
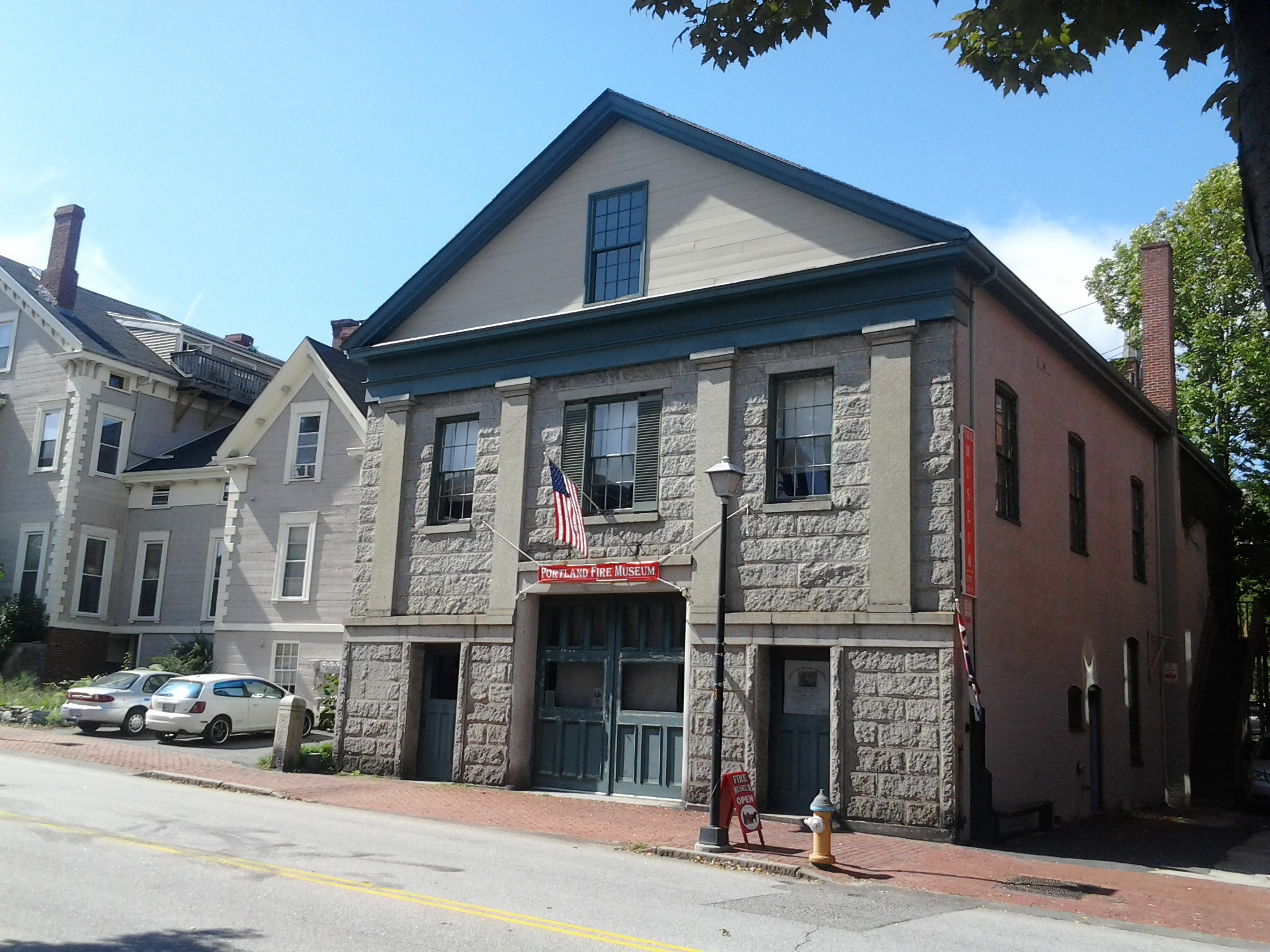
- The Portland Fire Museum building in September 2011

- Location within Maine Location within the United States
- Location: Forest, Oak, Danforth, Brackett and Pine Streets, Portland, Maine
- Coordinates: 43°39′8″N 70°15′50″W
- Area: 75 acres (30 ha)
- Architectural style: Federal, Mixed
- NRHP reference No.: 70000043
- Added to NRHP: April 3, 1970

The Spring Street Historic District encompasses surviving elements of the 19th-century commercial and surviving residential areas of Portland, Maine. Encompassing a portion of the city's Arts District and an eastern portion of its West End, the district has a significant concentration of residential and commercial buildings that survived the city's devastating 1866 fire. The district was listed on the National Register of Historic Places in 1970.

== Description and history ==
The Spring Street District is bounded on the south and west by Danforth and Brackett Streets. To the northwest it is bounded by a line extending from Brackett and Pine Streets, along Pine Street, across Congress Street to a point on Forest Avenue roughly midway between Cumberland and Congress Streets. To the northeast, it extends along Forest Avenue, splitting blocks to reach the junction of Spring and Oak Streets, and then running along Oak Street and across another block to reach Danforth Street.

Prominent buildings from the early 19th century include the Charles Q. Clapp House, the McLellan-Sweat Mansion (later incorporated into the Portland Museum of Art), and the 1833 Park Street Church. Also located in the district are the former fire station housing the Portland Fire Museum, the home of John Neal, the home of Prentiss Mellen later converted into a monastery, and an 1805 mansion designed by Alexander Parris later converted to the Portland Club. Commercial buildings in the district include the flatiron Charles Q. Clapp Block. Notable later buildings include the Italianate Victoria Mansion, built in 1860 and now also a museum. Many of the properties in the district were built during periods of prosperity before the 1866 fire.

In 1988, 7 protesters, include State Representative James V. Oliver, were arrested while trying to block the demolition of an 1857 building on Park Street. A month later, Portland's City Council passed a significantly enhanced anti-demolition ordinance which blocked the destruction of buildings in all Historic Districts unless the buildings were found to be dangerous and unusable.

== See also ==
- Western Promenade Historic District
- National Register of Historic Places listings in Portland, Maine
