= William Clapp House =

Historic house in Massachusetts, United States

- U.S. Historic district – Contributing property
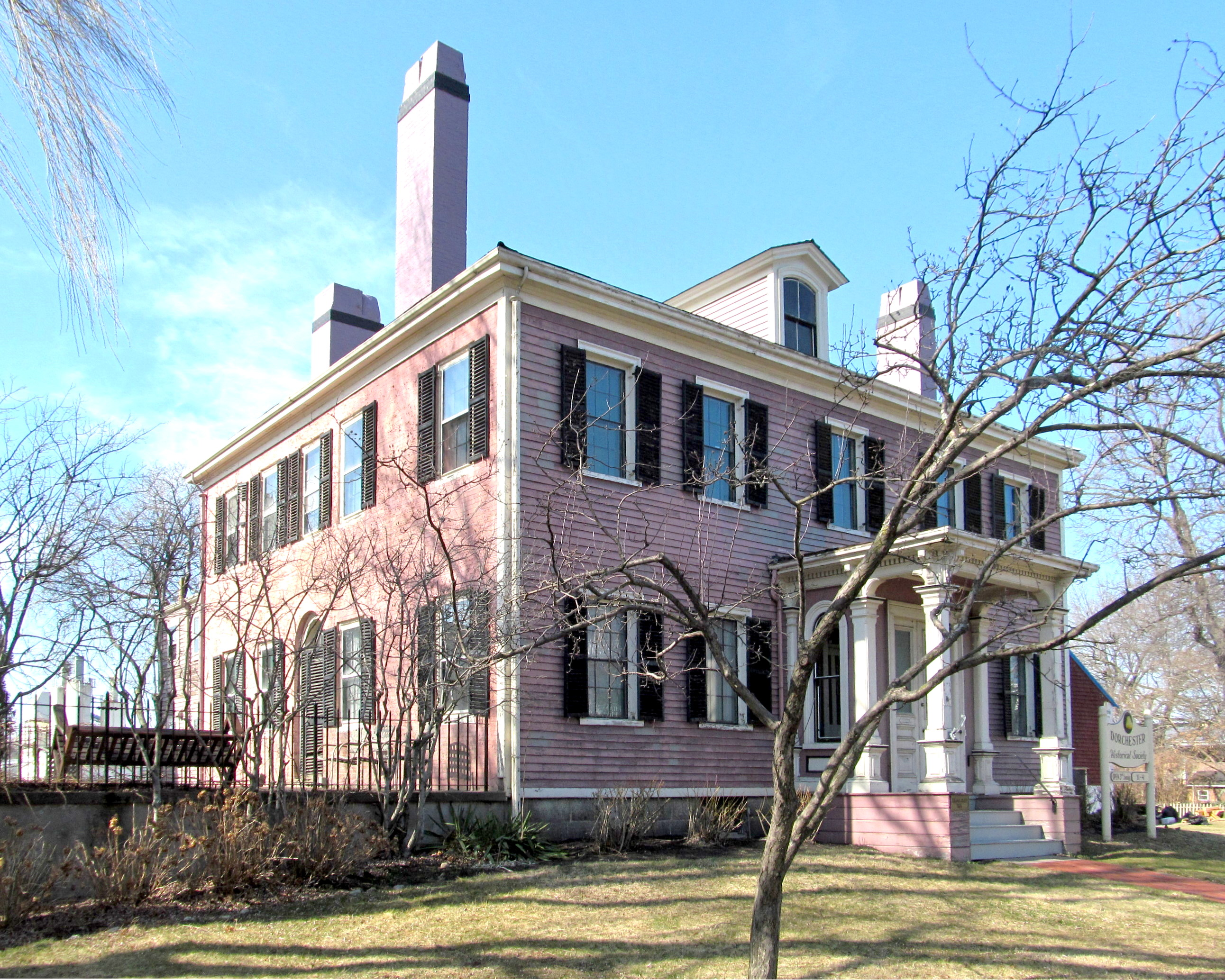
- William Clapp House

- Location within Boston Location within Massachusetts Location within the United States
- Location: Boston, MA
- Coordinates: 42°19′23.7″N 71°3′39.0″W
- Built: 1765
- Architectural style: Colonial, Federal
- Part of: Clapp Houses (ID74000911)
- Added to NRHP: May 2, 1974

The William Clapp House (1806) is a historic house located at 195 Boston Street, Dorchester, Massachusetts. It is the headquarters of the Dorchester Historical Society and contains many items from the society's collections, including 19th century furnishings and local historical items. It is one of two Clapp Houses owned by the society that are listed on the National Register of Historic Places.

The house was built in 1806 for the marriage of William Clapp (March 3, 1779 - February 29, 1860), son of Capt. Lemuel and Rebecca (Dexter) Clap who built the nearby Captain Lemuel Clap House. The younger Clapp followed his father's business with the largest tannery in Dorchester.

Later in life, Clapp devoted his time to his farm and the development of many varieties of pears. The most notable was Clapp's Favorite, developed in 1820 and marketed by 1860. It remains in wide commercial use today.
