= Captain Lemuel Clap House =

Historic house in Massachusetts, United States

- U.S. Historic district – Contributing property
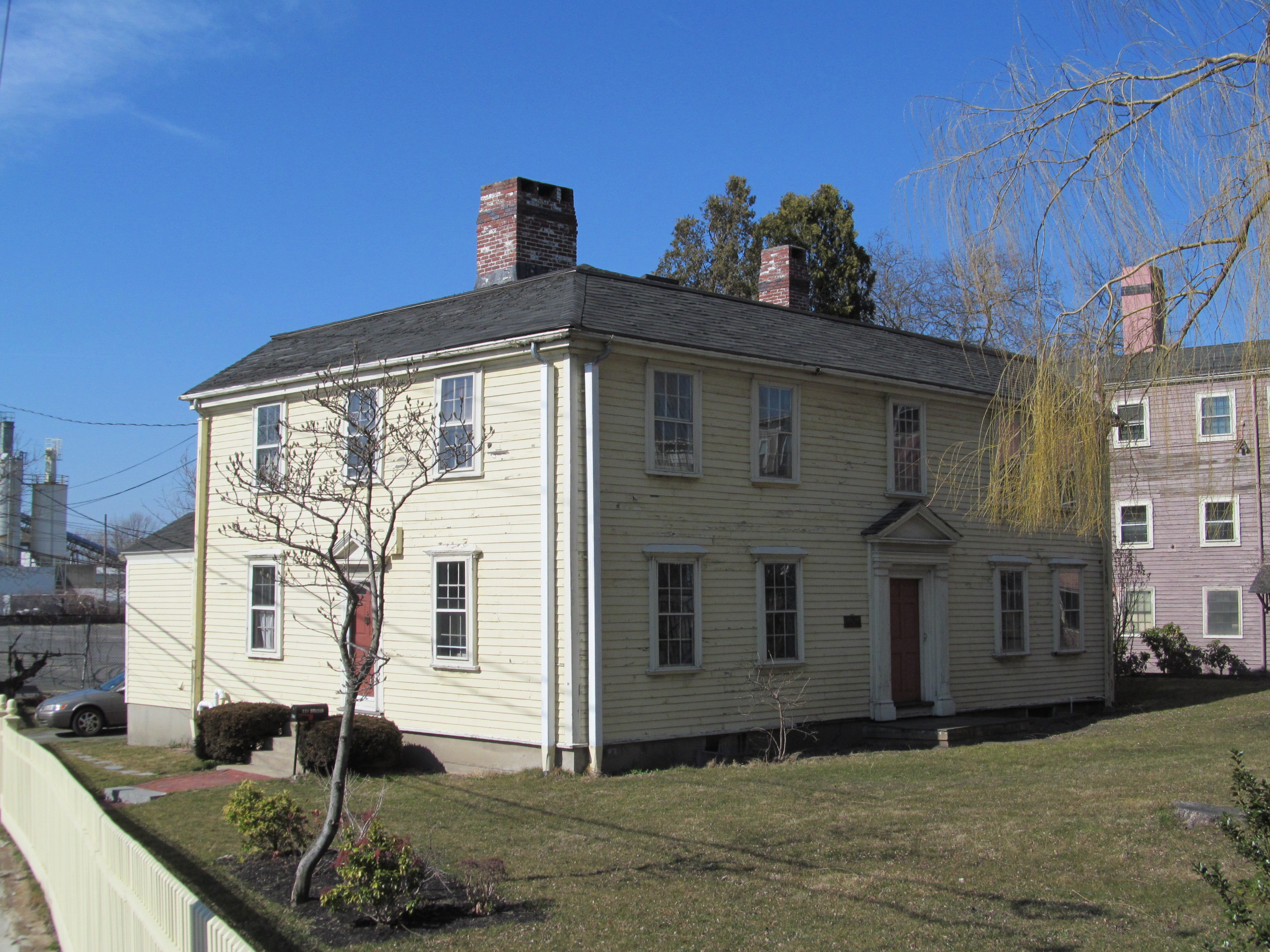
- Captain Lemuel Clap House

- Location within Massachusetts
- Location: Boston, MA
- Coordinates: 42°19′23.3″N 71°3′39.8″W
- Built: 1765
- Architectural style: Colonial, Federal
- Part of: Clapp Houses (ID74000911)
- Added to NRHP: May 2, 1974

The Captain Lemuel Clap House (1767) is a historic house located at 199 Boston Street, Dorchester, Massachusetts. It is now owned by the Dorchester Historical Society, which opens the house for tours two afternoons per month. It is one of two Clapp Houses owned by the society that are listed on the National Register of Historic Places.

It appears that a house has occupied this site since about 1633, and possibly today's house was its enlargement. Although there is no solid evidence for this possibility, the Clapp family genealogy records that such a first house was built circa 1633 by Roger Clapp, one of Dorchester's original settlers in 1630, and then rebuilt and enlarged by his descendant Lemuel Clap in 1767. On the other hand, the Historical Society also has evidence that the earlier house was built by the Ward family at the beginning of the 18th century.

There seems little doubt, however, that today's house was substantially constructed by Lemuel Clap in 1767. The house was purchased by Historical Society in 1945, and moved several hundred yards from Willow Court to its current location in 1957. Its rooms currently contain items from the Society's historical collection.

The houses of the Dorchester Historical Society are open on the second Sunday of the month from 11 am to 4 pm.
