= Klapp =

Klapp is a surname. Notable people with the surname include:

- Elinor Klapp-Phipps Park, a park in Tallahassee, Florida
- Eugene Klapp, early editor of House Beautiful

== See also ==
- Clapp, a surname
- Knapp (surname)
