= Clapp Houses =

Historic houses in Massachusetts, United States

- U.S. National Register of Historic Places
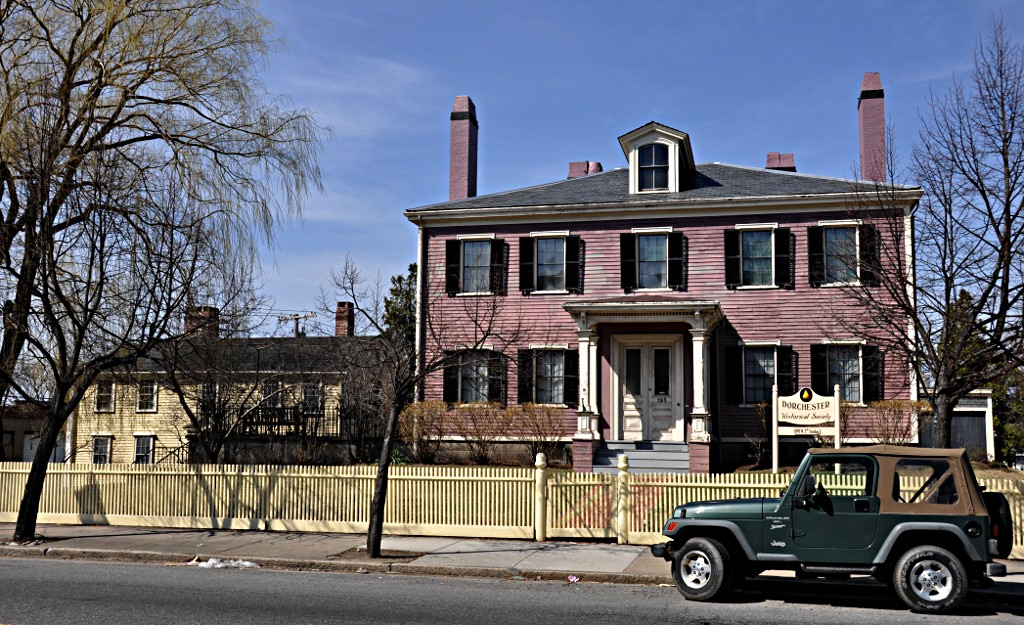
- The William Clapp House

- Location within Massachusetts Location within the United States
- Location: 199 and 195 Boston Street, Boston, Massachusetts
- Coordinates: 42°19′23.5″N 71°3′39.5″W
- Built: 1765
- Architectural style: Colonial, Federal
- NRHP reference No.: 74000911
- Added to NRHP: May 2, 1974

The Clapp Houses are historic houses in Boston, Massachusetts. They currently house the Dorchester Historic Society, and are open to the public as house museums.

Portions of the Captain Lemuel Clap House may have been built as early as 1633 by Roger Clapp; it is known to that a house was on the site in that year. The house went through extensive changes in 1767, when it was expanded and renovated by Lemuel Clap. The William Clapp House was built in 1806 by Lemuel Clap's son William. The family operated a large Dorchester tannery.

The property containing both houses was purchased by Dorchester Historical Society in 1945, and they were moved several hundred yards from Willow Court to their present locations in 1957. The houses were listed on the National Register of Historic Places in 1974.

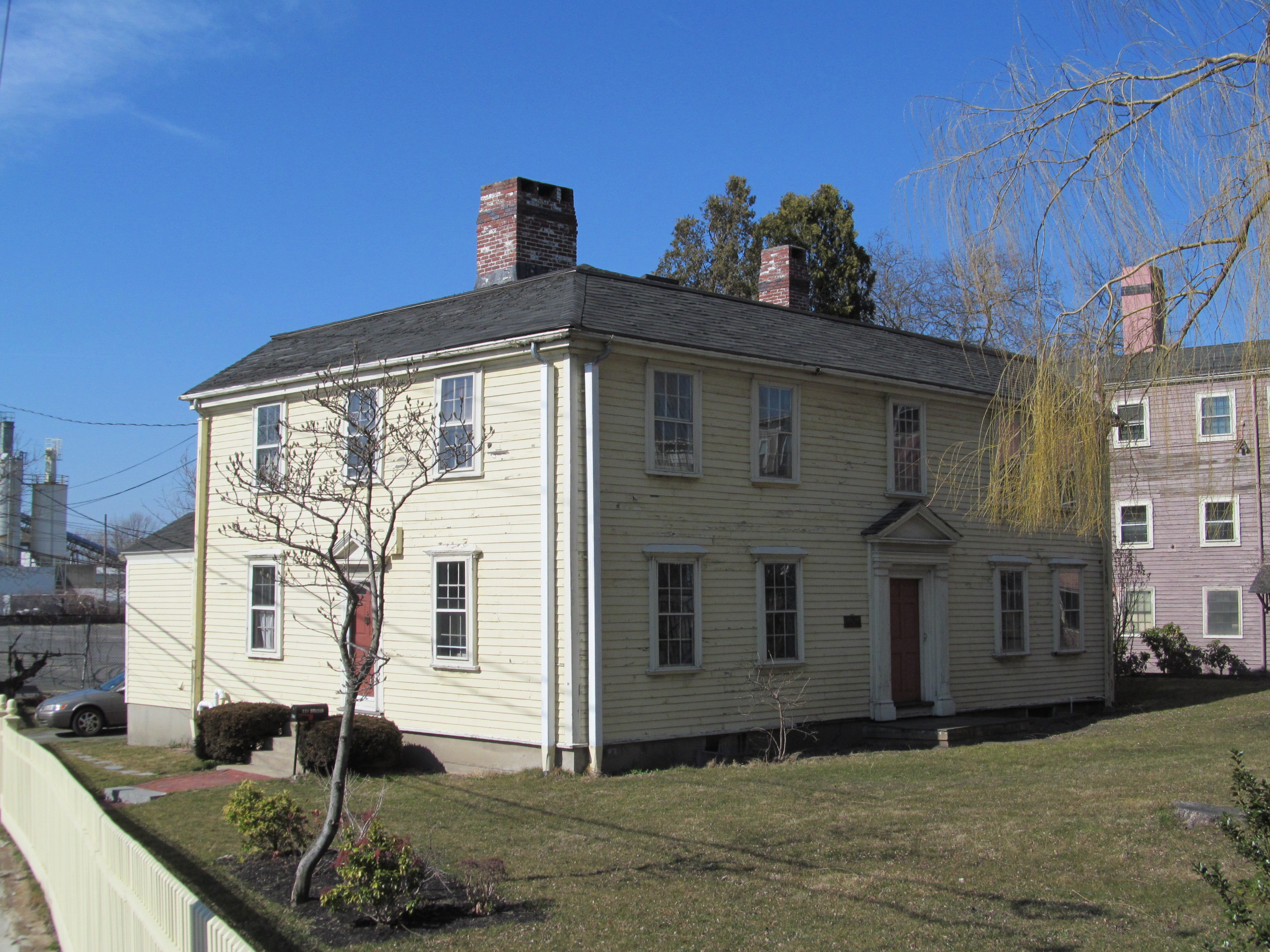
The Captain Lemuel Clap House

== See also ==
- National Register of Historic Places listings in southern Boston, Massachusetts
