= Charles Q. Clapp Block =

Historic building in Portland, Maine, US

- U.S. National Register of Historic Places
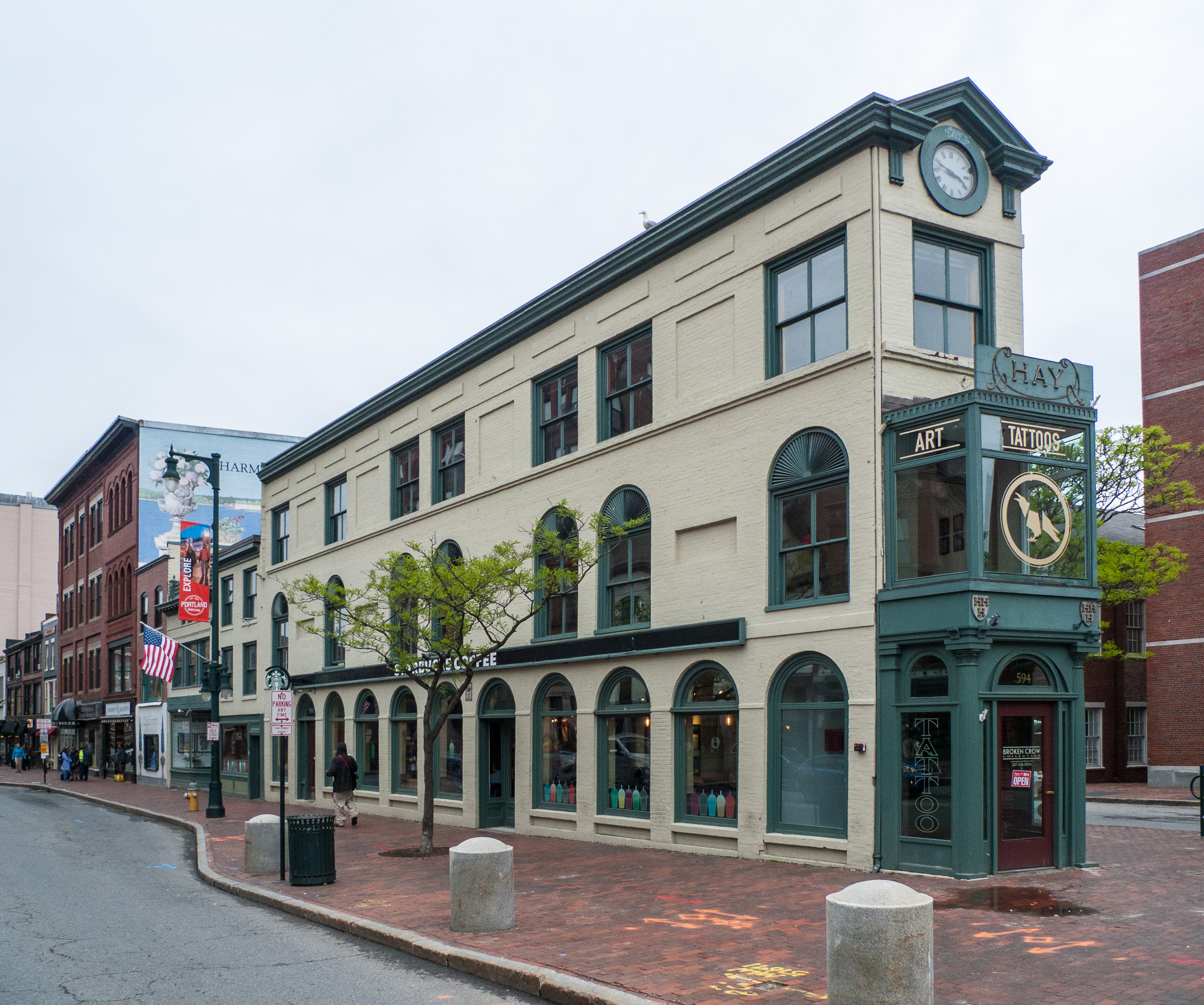

- Location within Maine Location within the United States
- Location: Congress Sq., Portland, Maine
- Coordinates: 43°39′15″N 70°15′47″W
- Area: 0.5 acres (0.20 ha)
- Built: 1826
- Architect: Charles Q. Clapp; John Calvin Stevens
- Architectural style: Federal
- NRHP reference No.: 78000168
- Added to NRHP: January 31, 1978

The Charles Q. Clapp Block (also known as the Hay Building) is a historic commercial building in Congress Square in downtown Portland, Maine. It occupies a prominent triangular site at the intersections of Congress, High and Free Streets. Built in 1826, to a design by prominent local architect and merchant Charles Q. Clapp, it is one of the oldest commercial buildings in Portland.

== Description and history ==
The block is actually a collection of three buildings, extending along Congress and Free Streets in Congress Square, a major intersection in central Portland, Maine. The largest of the three buildings is essentially triangular in shape, presenting a narrow front to High Street. It is three stories in height, built of brick, which is painted beige with dark green trim. The lower two floors have seven arched window openings, with the main entrance on the short front facing High Street. The third floor, a later addition, has five, with projecting cornice above. The second building, northeast of the first, is also three stories, which are of lower height than the first. It is two bays wide, with square windows on the upper levels, and a picture window with entrance on the right on the first level, on the Congress Street side. The third building is 2-1/2 stories tall, three bays wide, also with a doorway (this one recessed) to the right of a picture window on the main floor. A slightly-protruding cornice at the top of the second floor is topped by a low balustrade.

The main block was designed by local architect Charles Quincy Clapp and built in 1826. It is a rare local example of a Federal-style commercial building, and is one of the oldest commercial blocks in the city. The building's ground floor was occupied from 1841 by Hay's Pharmacy, giving the building the name by which it is now most commonly known. The third level of the block was designed by John Calvin Stevens and added in 1922.

The columns framing the main entrance were reused from the 1740 Old Jerusalem Church, which stood at today's 425 Congress Street and was replaced in 1825 by the First Parish Church.

The building was listed on the National Register of Historic Places on January 31, 1978.

== See also ==
- National Register of Historic Places listings in Portland, Maine
