= Asa Clapp (politician) =

American politician (1805–1891)

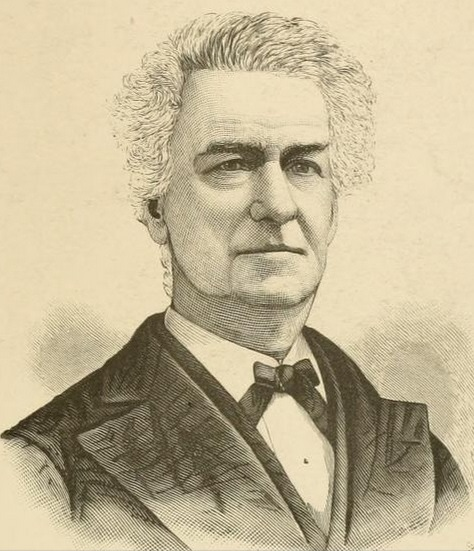
Asa W. H. Clapp (Maine Congressman)

Asa William Henry Clapp (March 6, 1805 – March 22, 1891) was a United States representative from Maine.

== Biography ==
Clapp, son of wealthy merchant and state legislator Asa Clapp (1762–1848), was born in Portland, Maine, in 1805. He graduated from Norwich University in 1823. He engaged as a merchant in foreign and domestic commerce in Portland.

He was elected as a Democrat to the 30th Congress (March 4, 1847 – March 3, 1849). He was not a candidate for renomination. He was a delegate to the 1848 and in 1848 and 1852 Democratic National Conventions.

He then resumed his former business pursuits, also serving as a director of the Maine General Hospital and of the Portland Public Library until his death in Portland in 1891. His interment was in the city's Evergreen Cemetery.

U.S. House of Representatives
Preceded by Robert P. Dunlap	Member of the U.S. House of Representatives from Maine's 2nd congressional district March 4, 1847 – March 3, 1849	Succeeded by Nathaniel Littlefield
