= Jessica Nicoll =

American art curator

Jessica F. Nicoll is an American museum director and curator and an authority on American art and culture. She serves as Director and Louise Ines Doyle '34 Chief Curator of the Smith College Museum of Art. She was previously the Chief Curator and Curator of American Art of the Portland Museum of Art.

== Education ==
In 1979, Nicoll attended Smith College, from where she earned a Bachelor of Arts in Art History and American Studies in 1983. In 1986, Nicoll received her Master of Arts degree in Early American Culture and a certificate in Museum Studies from the Winterthur Program in American Material Culture at the University of Delaware.

== Career in the arts ==
=== 1986-1992: Old Sturbridge Village ===
From 1985 to 1986, Nicoll completed a post-graduate curatorial fellowship at the Winterthur Museum in Winterthur, Delaware. Upon completion of the fellowship, Nicoll returned to Massachusetts to accept a post as Curator of Exhibits at the Old Sturbridge Village, a living museum. During her time there, she served as project director for the exhibitions “Meet Your Neighbors: New England Portraits, Painters and Society, 1790-1850” and “Changing Times, Changing Lives: Women in Rural New England in the early 19th century.”

=== 1992-2005: Portland Museum of Art ===
In 1992, Nicoll was hired as Curator of American Art at the Portland Museum of Art. She was later promoted to Chief Curator and William E. and Helen E. Thon Curator of American Art in 1995. During her tenure, Nicoll curated numerous noteworthy exhibitions featuring folk art, fabric collages, contemporary abstract works, paintings, drawing, prints and photography. Major exhibitions include "The Allure of the Maine Coast: Robert Henri and His Circle, 1903-1918" (June 1995), "Neil Welliver Prints: The Essence of Maine" (February 1996), "Andrew Wyeth at 80: A Celebration" (July 1997), "A Legacy for Maine: Masterworks from the Collection of Elizabeth B. Noyce" (October 1997), "Winslow Homer Facing Nature" (May 1998), "Dahlov Ipcar: Seven Decades of Creativity" (October 2001), "Marguerite & William Zorach: Harmonies and Contrasts" (November 2001), "The Poetry Within: The Life & Work of William Thon" (February 2002), "Charles Codman: The Landscape of Art and Culture in 19th-century Maine" (November 2002), and "Rockwell Kent: The Mythic and the Modern" (June 2005).

Nicoll also oversaw the restoration, interpretation, and reinstallation of the Museum’s Federal-era McLellan House and the historic L. D. M. Sweat Memorial Galleries, and she also reinstalled the Museum’s permanent collection galleries in the Charles Shipman Payson Building, allowing for a more integrated interpretation of the collection. Nicoll also authored numerous exhibition catalogues and gallery guides, and published many scholarly articles on topics including the architecture of Federal-era mansions and Quaker quilts; American artists such as Will Barnet, Abraham Bogdanove, Charles Codman, Winslow Homer, William and Marguerite Zorach; the art collection of American philanthropist Elizabeth B. Noyce; and the artistic community formed by Robert Henri on Monhegan Island.

Under Nicoll's leadership, Nicoll helped the Portland Museum of Art build a larger, professional curatorial staff, and grow its collection through major gifts and purchases. Among the many major purchase initiatives overseen by Nicoll were Marsden Hartley’s Kinsman Falls (1930, oil on canvas), Marguerite Zorach’s The Garden (1914, oil and charcoal on canvas) and Diana of the Sea (1940, oil on canvas), and Louise Nevelson’s Untitled (circa 1976, painted wood).

=== 2005-present: Smith College Museum of Art ===
In 2005, Nicoll returned to her alma mater where she succeeded Suzannah Fabing as Director and Chief Curator of the Smith College Museum of Art. Fabing retired after a 13-year tenure, during which the museum underwent an extensive renovation and expansion.

Under Nicoll's leadership, the museum has given particular attention to American female artists. In 2017, Nicoll oversaw the exhibition, "A Dangerous Woman: Subversion and Surrealism in the Art of Honoré Sharrer,” which took a fresh look at American artist Honoré Desmond Sharrer (1920-2009). The exhibition featured about 60 works, predominantly paintings, many of which came from Sharrer's estate. The exhibition, which represented the first public survey of Sharrer's work in many years, was organized by the Columbus Museum of Art, Ohio and the Pennsylvania Academy of Fine Arts, and funded by the support of Smith alumnae Judith Plesser Targan '53, Art Museum Fund and the Charlotte Frank Rabb '35 Fund.

== Personal life ==
Nicoll serves as a member of the New England Advisory Committee of the Archives of American Art, a research center within the Smithsonian Institution in Washington, D.C. She is also a director in the Northeast Small College Art Museum Association (NESCAMA).

Nicoll currently resides with her family in Springfield, Massachusetts.
