= Charles Shipman Payson Building =

Coordinates: 43°39′14″N 70°15′45″W

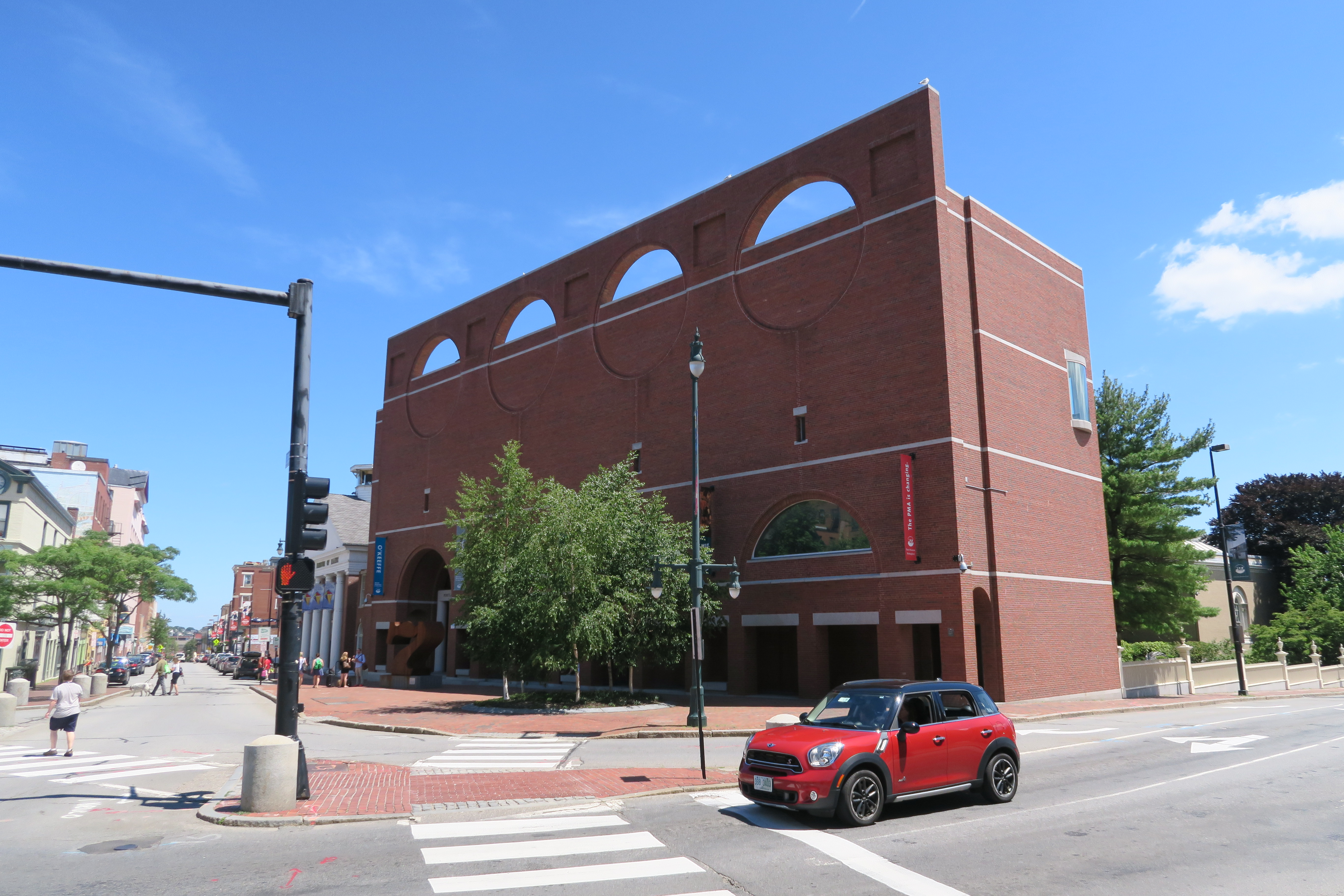
Pictured in 2016

The Charles Shipman Payson Building is the most recent expansion of the Portland Museum of Art (PMA) in Portland, Maine, located on the corner of High Street and Congress Square. Henry N. Cobb (of Pei Cobb Freed & Partners) designed the Payson Building, which introduced over five times more gallery space than in the adjacent, historic PMA buildings (McLellan-Sweat House, Charles Quincy Clapp House, and L. D. M. Sweat Memorial Galleries). The building opened in 1983 after Mr. Payson donated 17 Winslow Homer paintings and ten million dollars to the museum. Similar in theme to these Homer paintings, the Payson building contains a collection of contemporary paintings and short-term exhibitions created by Maine artists, focusing on regional themes.

== Exterior design details ==
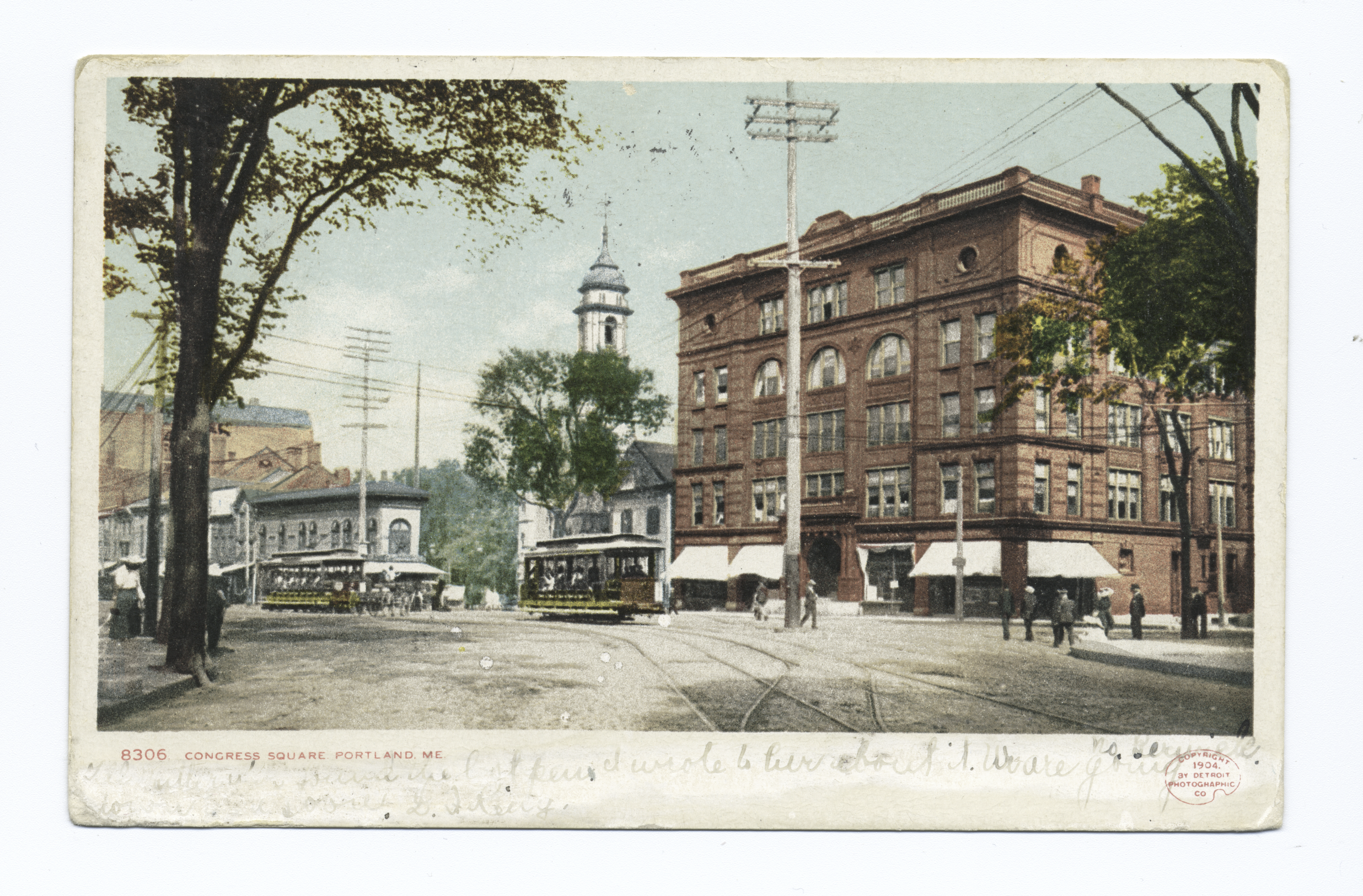
The museum replaced the Libby Building (at right in this c.1900 view). The Free Street Baptist Church was demolished to make way for the Chamber of Commerce. The Children's Museum of Maine later occupied that building.

Cobb’s largest challenge was to create a building that provided an enjoyable and powerful location to view art while relating to the diverse conditions of its awkwardly shaped urban site. The tall brick buildings enclosing the other sides of Congress Square required the Payson building to contain a unified, strong, large-scale presence. Conversely, the smaller, historic PMA buildings on the Spring Street side of the building site required the Payson Building to have a smaller building form that would accommodate these historic neighbors. Cobb’s solution was to design a wide façade made of red brick and gray granite lintels with semicircle openings, reflecting the design of the five-story Libby Building, which formerly occupied the location. This façade has the street presence of a Renaissance palazzo, enclosing the public square. Behind the façade, Cobb gradually reduced both the height and length of the building until the building terminated in the back left corner, one-fourth as wide and tall as the main façade. By stepping the building back and down in this way, Cobb was successfully able to grant primacy to the neighboring historic buildings.

Cobb chose to comprise the structure of the Payson Building of a concrete frame with a concrete block infill, rendering the façade essentially a “curtain wall.” This led to criticism from other architects that Cobb gave the building a false, billboard-like front. Cobb claims, however, that the façade symbolically represents the interior. The circular insets and cutouts are metaphors that recall the square interior galleries and the rectangular brick insets signify the rectangular interior circulation spaces.

== Interior design details ==
Behind the controversial façade lies many galleries with clean white walls and pine floors with granite stripping set into the floor. This granite marks off twenty-foot by twenty-foot spaces, thought by Cobb to be the smallest desirable gallery space. Around these square spaces, granite strips also delineate rectangular circulation spaces around each square. Over certain granite strips, Cobb placed walls with wide cutout doors to shape various-sized gallery spaces.

To reflect and accommodate the diversity of the Homer paintings, Cobb not only strategically placed walls to create different-sized gallery spaces but also varied the ceiling height from 12.5 to 25 to 37.5 feet (3.8–11.4 m) high. These diverse gallery spaces were intentionally designed to provide no clear path through the museum. Cobb claimed that this layout reflected the lack of grand boulevards and grids in the modest cities of New England. Further, Cobb’s layout of the galleries allows a visitor standing in one gallery to see glimpses of several other galleries, often on multiple levels, through the wide gallery doors. This gives the visitor a sense of adventure and anticipation as he or she travels through the galleries.

Perhaps the most compelling feature of the galleries is the lighting, rivaling that of Louis Kahn’s Kimball Gallery. The galleries are lit with cascading domed ceilings, which are filled with daylight from superimposed octagonal clerestory lanterns based on the Dulwich College Art Gallery by John Soane. Clerestories permit maximum sunlight to enter the gallery while avoiding direct rays hitting the gallery walls. This natural light is accompanied by incandescent track lighting, although this artificial lighting is often left off during the day. The shifting light entering the museum animates, diffuses, and shapes the galleries below, celebrating the museum's collections with “Portland Light.”

== Historical inspirations ==
In designing the Payson Building, many significant works of modern architecture influenced Cobb. The façades of Kahn’s Indian Institute of Management in Ahmedabad, India (semicircle openings, large sections of plain brick) and Kahn’s Phillips Exeter Academy Library arcade in New Hampshire partially inspired the façade of the Payson building. The famous lighting from the Dulwich Picture Gallery, the Kimball Art Museum in Fort Worth, and the lanterns of Ely Cathedral inspired lighting for the Payson Building. Further influences include a portico by Ledoux, the Doge’s Palace in Venice, and other precedents.

== Regionalism ==
Beyond these more famous influences, Cobb also had a strong desire to link the Payson building to Maine. He remarked, “The Portland Museum is a regional museum in a region that is itself a museum, so I believe I had an obligation to connect the new building to the city and the region.” To express the museum’s connection to Maine, Cobb used locally made materials common to Maine (water-struck brick, pine, and granite) as his chief design materials. These materials refer to the vernacular architecture of Portland, defined by the brick commercial buildings and warehouses of the Old Port and the Federal-style brick buildings near the museum. Furthermore, from the ground looking up at the Payson building, one is struck with how the façade’s semicircular openings encase the air and light of Maine, making it part of the building. A similar effect is achieved with the building’s many octagonal clerestories. These clerestories also recall the viewing decks of the region’s lighthouses as well as the octagonal Portland Observatory, a major city icon. Additionally, porthole-like windows reveal views of the Fore River, recalling Maine’s rich nautical history.
