= Rose Marasco =

American photographer

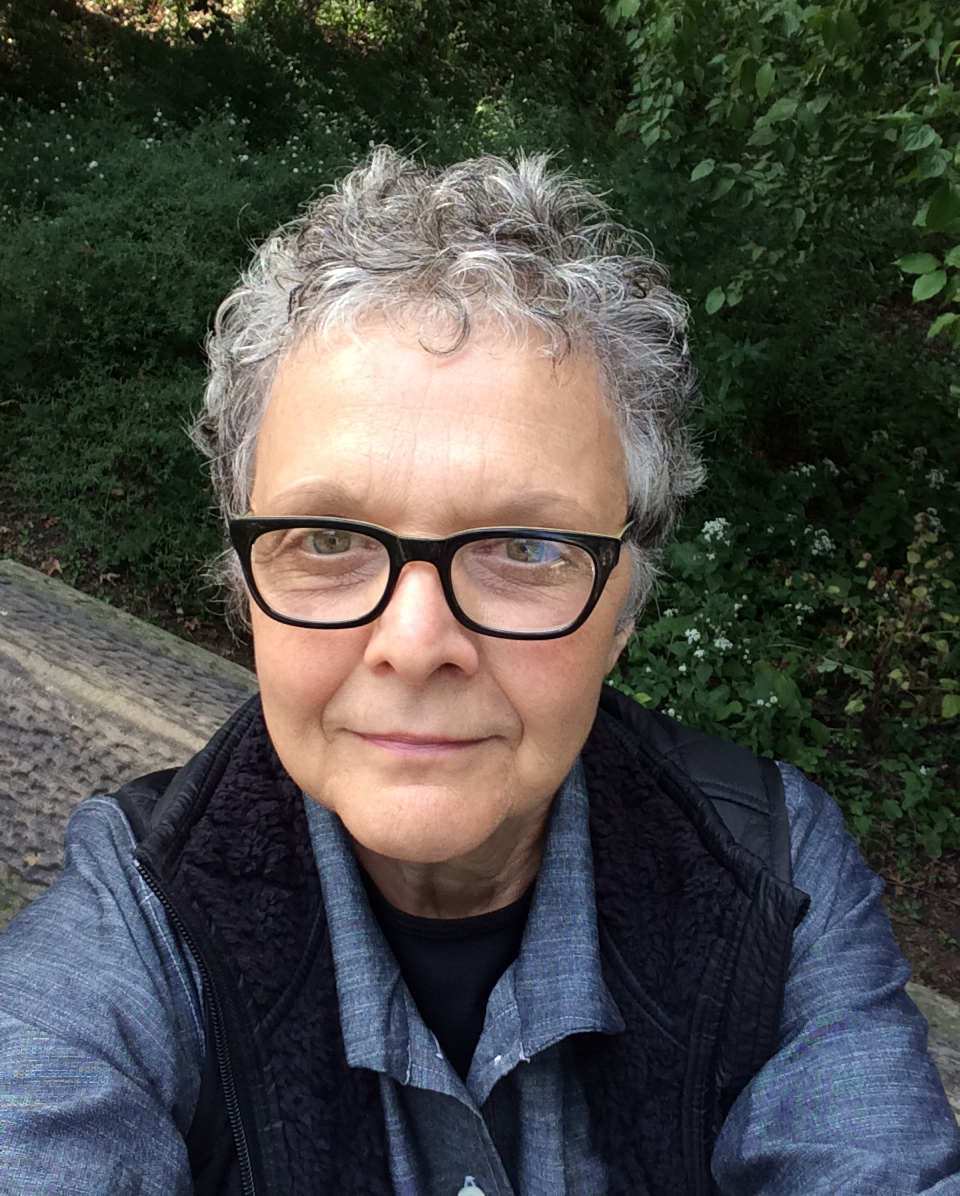
- Self portrait of Rose Marasco.
- Born: December 25, 1948 (age 77); Utica, New York
- Education: BFA: Syracuse University; MA: Goddard College; MFA: Visual Studies Workshop in Rochester, New York

Rose Marasco (born December 25, 1948), is an American photographer. She is considered to be "perhaps Maine’s most prolific photographer,” living and working there since 1979.

== Early life and education ==
Rose Marasco grew up in Utica, New York. She earned her Bachelor of Fine Arts in photography at Syracuse University in 1971, an M.A. from Goddard College in 1981, and her Master of Fine Arts at the Visual Studies Workshop in Rochester. where she studied under Nathan Lyons and Joan Lyons.

== Teaching career ==
After leaving VSW, Marasco "initiated the photography program at Munson Williams Proctor Arts Institute in Utica, NY, establishing the curriculum, darkrooms, & studios, and teaching both black & white and color" from 1974 to 1979. Marasco moved to Maine in 1979 for a position at the University of Southern Maine, where she taught photography for 35 years, retiring as Distinguished Professor Emeritus in 2014.

== Artistic career ==
Marasco has been an exhibited artist since 1971 with twenty-eight solo shows and more than eighty group shows. Marasco’s photographs are included in public collections of distinction including at the Fogg Museum at Harvard University, the Davis Museum and Cultural Center at Wellesley College, the New York Public Library Photography Collection, the Portland Museum of Art, and the Bowdoin College Museum of Art, among others. She has lectured about her work at Harvard University, Parsons School of Design, the Center for Photography at Woodstock, Bowdoin College, Maine College of Art, and many other institutions in the United States.

In 2015 the Portland Museum of Art mounted a major retrospective, called index, of Marasco's work, organized by PMA Chief Curator Jessica May. Describing her method in a review of the exhibition, critic John Yau wrote, “It seems to me that Marasco deserves both a full-sized monograph and to be better known. She is more than Maine’s most prolific photographer.” In 2016 Marasco was awarded the Maine Women's Fund Sarah Orne Jewett Award, given to "a Maine woman who exhibits the attributes of the women in Jewett’s works of fiction: true grit, independence, courage, humor and discipline," and in 2005, received the Excellence in Photographic Teaching Award from Santa Fe Center for Photography New Mexico.

== Select solo exhibitions ==
- 2024 My Lynne Drexlers, Moss Galleries, Falmouth, Maine
- 2024 Diffusions #1, OSMOS Station, Stamford, New York
- 2018 Rose Marasco: index, a career retrospective, Munson-Williams-Proctor Arts Institute, Utica, New York
- 2015 Rose Marasco: index, a career retrospective, Portland Museum of Art, Portland, Maine
- 2015 Patrons of Husbandry, Ogunquit Museum of American Art, Ogunquit, Maine
- 2014 New York City Pinhole Photographs, Meredith Ward Fine Art, New York
- 2010 Projections, Houston Center for Photography, Houston, Texas
- 2008 The Invented Photograph. Universite de Bretagne Occidentale, Brest, France
- 2004 Domestic Objects: Past and Presence, University of Southern Maine, and traveled to Southwest Harbor Public Library, University of Maine Museum of Art, Bangor, and University of Maine at Farmington
- 2003 Circles, Sarah Morthland Gallery, New York
- 2002 Open House: Margaret Jane Mussey Sweat, Portland Museum of Art, Portland, Maine
- 2000 Leafing, Sarah Morthland Gallery, New York
- 1998 New England Diary, Sarah Morthland Gallery, New York
- 1996 Ritual and Community: The Maine Grange, Latvian Museum of Photography, Riga, Latvia
- 1995 Tender Buttons: Women’s Domestic Objects, Davis Museum at Wellesley College, Wellesley, Massachusetts
- 1999 Ritual and Community: The Maine Grange, Farnsworth Art Museum, Rockland, Maine
- 1980 Rose Marasco: Photographs, Goddard College, Plainfield, Vermont

== Public collections ==
- Bates College Museum of Art, Lewiston, Maine
- Bowdoin College Museum of Art, Brunswick, Maine
- Colby College Museum of Art, Waterville, Maine
- Davis Museum and Cultural Center at Wellesley College
- Farnsworth Art Museum, Rockland, Maine
- Fidelity Investments Corporate Art Collection
- Fogg Museum at Harvard University
- Library of Congress, Washington, D.C.
- The Maine Historic Preservation Commission, Augusta, Maine
- Maine Women Writers Collection, University of New England, Portland, Maine
- National Museum of American History
- New York Public Library Miriam and Ira D. Wallach Division of Art, Prints and Photographs
- Photographic Resource Center, Artists’ Book Archive, Boston, Massachusetts
- Polaroid International Collection, Cambridge, Massachusetts
- Portland Museum of Art, Portland, Maine
- Rhode Island School of Design Museum of Art, Providence, Rhode Island
- Syracuse University, Newhouse Communications Center, Syracuse, New York
- University of New England Art Gallery, Portland, Maine
- University of Maine Museum of Art, Bangor, Maine
- Visual Studies Workshop, Rochester, New York

== Teaching ==
- 2021 Maine Art Educators Workshop, Tides Institute, Eastport, Maine
- 2019 Full-Time Summer Studio Faculty, Maine College of Art & Design MFA program, Portland, Maine
- 2016–present Non-Resident Studio Faculty, New England College MFA Program, Manchester, New Hampshire
- 2014 Distinguished Professor Emerita, University of Southern Maine Department of Art, Gorham, Maine
- 2010–2014 Distinguished Professor, University of Southern Maine Department of Art, Gorham, Maine
- 2000–2010 Professor, University of Southern Maine Department of Art, Gorham, Maine
- 2007–present Non-Resident Studio Faculty, Lesley University MFA Program, Boston, Massachusetts
- 2001–present Non-Resident Studio Faculty, Maine College of Art & Design MFA program, Portland, Maine
- 1992–2000 Associate Professor, University of Southern Maine Department of Art, Gorham, Maine
- 1981–1987 Instructor, Portland School of Art (now Maine College of Art & Design), Portland, Maine
- 1981 Visiting Professor, Colby College, Waterville, Maine
- 1979–1992 Assistant Professor, University of Southern Maine Department of Art, Gorham, Maine
- 1974–1979 Instructor & Founding Head of Photography, Munson-Williams-Proctor Arts Institute, Utica, New York

== Books ==
=== Covers ===
- Camouflage by Murray Bail (2001) Farrar, Straus and Giroux
- Latest Will: New & Selected Poems by Lenore Marshall (2002) W.W. Norton & Company
- Confessions by Kang Zhengguo (2007) W.W. Norton & Company
- Mouth Wide Open by John Thorne (2007) North Point Press

=== Work included in ===
- AT HOME text and photographs by Rose Marasco. Foreword by Lucy R. Lippard. Osmos Books, 2023.
- Thoughts on Landscape: Collected Writings and Interviews by Frank Gohlke. Hol Art Books, 2009.
- Portland Through the Lens edited by Lisa Bow. Warren Machine Company, 2007.
- Undomesticated Interiors essays by April Gallant and Mimi Hellman. Smith College Museum of Art, 2003.
- Designing Identity by Marc English. Rockport Publishers, 2000.
- The Lure of the Local: Senses of Place in a Multicentered Society by Lucy R. Lippard. The New Press, 1997.

== Select Critical Reviews ==
Jorge S. Arango, "Double Feature at Moss Galleries: Otherworldly paintings and creative photographic riffs." Maine Sunday Telegram, June 30, 2024.

Julien Langevin, "Plastic Expressions in Particularity: Nature Moves in Tracy McKenna’s Shift at Able Baker Contemporary." ArtSpiel, November 21, 2019.

John Yau, “Photographs That Write With Light.” Hyperallergic, November 16, 2019.

John Yau, "A Photographer Who Deserves to Be Widely Known." Hyperallergic, August 30, 2015.

Mark Feeney, “In Portland, a survey of Rose Marasco’s photographs." Boston Globe, May 28, 2015.
