= Abby Robinson =

American photographer

Abby Robinson was an American photographer. Robinson is known for her AutoWorks series of self-portraits, taken over a period of 40 years. Her work is included in the collections of the Whitney Museum of American Art, the Portland Museum of Art and the Houston Museum of Fine Arts.
