= L. D. M. Sweat Memorial Galleries =

Coordinates: 43°39′13″N 70°15′43″W

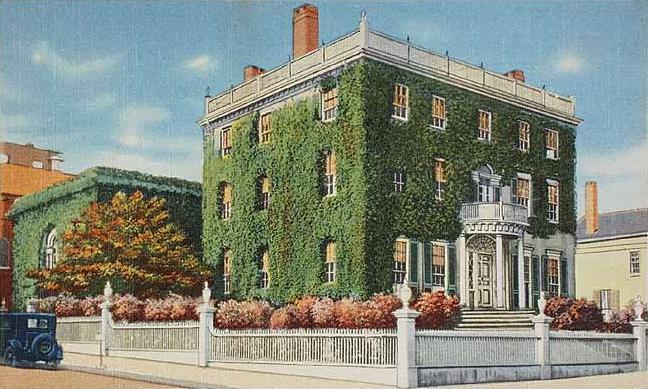
L. D. M. Sweat Memorial Galleries, at left behind the McLellan-Sweat Mansion, as it appeared c. 1922

The L. D. M. Sweat Memorial Galleries are a series of art galleries that are part of the Portland Museum of Art, which is located in the Arts District of Portland, Maine.

== History ==
The L. D. M. Sweat Memorial Galleries were built in 1911 by Maine architect John Calvin Stevens. They were named to honor Lorenzo De Medici Sweat, the husband of Portland Museum of Art benefactor, Margaret Jane Mussey Sweat (1823–1908). The building was designed to complement the Federal style architecture of the McLellan House, the oldest building of the museum complex. The McLellan House and Sweat Galleries were closed in 1980 for the construction of the Payson Building. They remained closed until October 5, 2002, after a two-year restoration.

== Collection focus ==
The primary focus is on 19th- and 20th-century American art — sculpture, furniture, decorative arts and paintings, with specific emphasis on a large collection of works by Winslow Homer. As stated by the museum's board, the works of art in the galleries are an attempt to:

... reflect the changing customs, tastes, and concerns of Americans who created, purchased, and commissioned them. In these galleries, you will travel back through the history of art in the United States. The journey begins with works created on the eve of the 20th century that look back to the United States' rich history and forward to the challenges of a new era. These give way to the lush portraits, still lifes, and exotic scenes that represent the height of academic painting in America and the tastes of a cultivated and wealthy leisure class.

== Works in collection ==
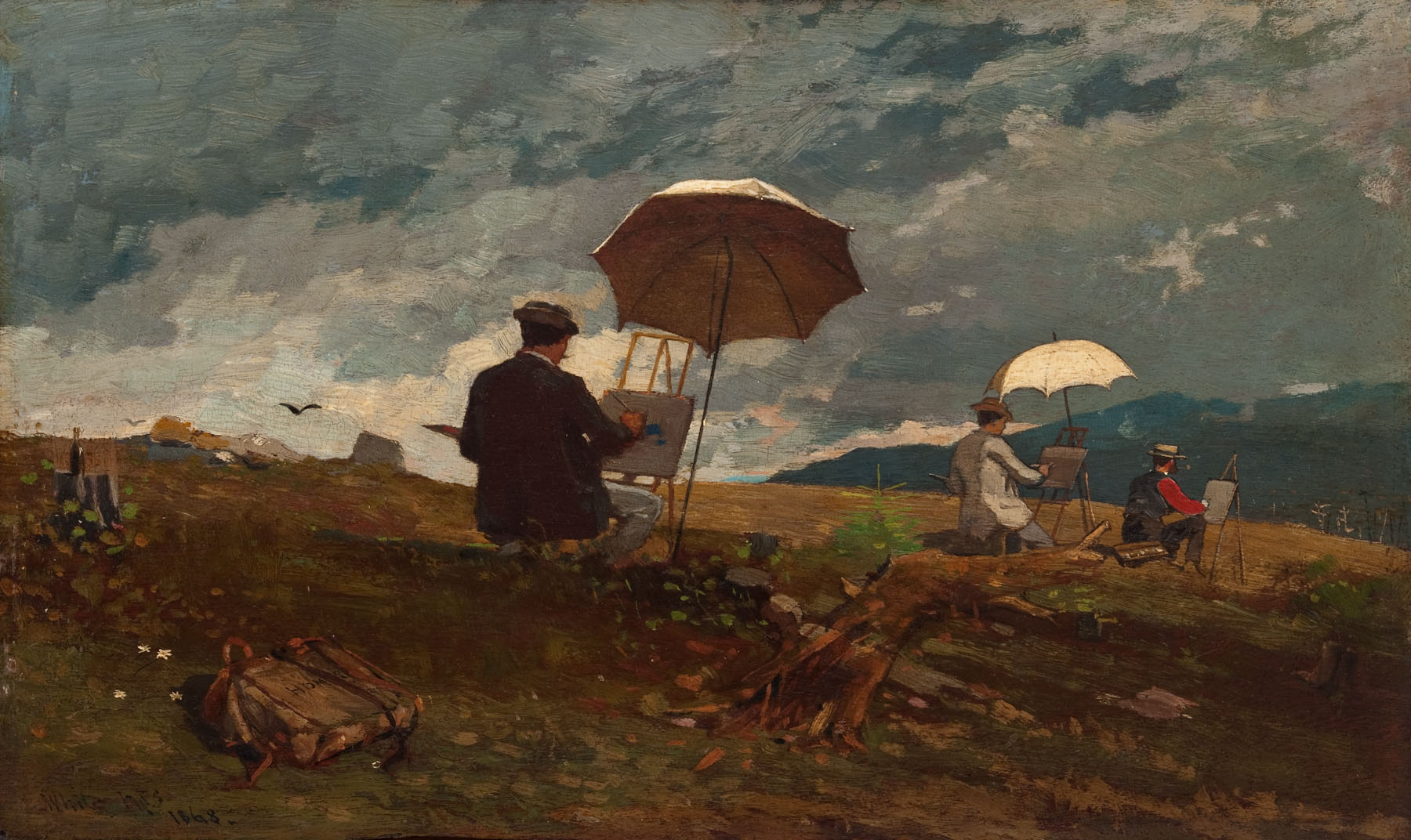
Artists Sketching in the White Mountains, 1868, by Winslow Homer

The galleries feature many 19th- and 20th-century American artists, including:

- Benjamin Paul Akers
- Hiram Powers
- Franklin Simmons
- Jim Dine
- Marsden Hartley
- Winslow Homer
- Jasper Johns
- Robert Motherwell
- Claes Oldenburg
- Robert Rauschenberg
- Alison Saar
- Andy Warhol
- Andrew Wyeth

== Publicity ==
In 2001, there was an open house at the galleries, where modern artists created works to enhance the gallery collection and yet fit in with the existing art and decor. Artists involved in the project included Jonathan Bailey, Paul D'Amato, Tonee Harbert, Rose Marasco, Tanja Alexia Hollander and Bernard C. Meyers. The first exhibition was new work by Sa Schloff.

The galleries have been featured in the Portland Journal of Antiquities, as well.
