= Ladue (disambiguation) =

Ladue is a city in Missouri.

Ladue or LaDue may also refer to:

- Ladue (surname)
- LaDue Reservoir, Ohio, United States

== See also ==
- La Due, Henry County, Missouri, United States
