= Bernard Meyer =

Bernard Meyer may refer to:

- Bernard F. Meyer (1891–1975), American Catholic missionary
- Bernard S. Meyer (1916–2005), American lawyer and politician

== See also ==
- Ernest Meyer (1865–1919), French show jumping champion, incorrectly listed as Bernard Meyer
- Bernard C. Meyers (born 1955), American photographer
- Bernhard Meyer (1767–1836), German medical doctor and naturalist
