= Nathan Cleaves =

American politician (1835–1892)

Nathan Cleaves (January 9, 1835-September 5, 1892) was an American lawyer, judge probate, and politician from Maine.

Born in 1835 in Bridgton, Maine, Cleaves studied at the Portland Academy before enrolling at Bowdoin College. His younger brother, Henry B. Cleaves, served as the 43rd governor of Maine from 1893 to 1897.

He was admitted to the Maine Bar in 1861 and practiced in Portland. In 1862, he established a practice with Lorenzo De Medici Sweat, then a sitting member of the U.S. House of Representatives. A Democrat, Cleaves served two terms in the Maine House of Representatives (1871-1875). In 1884, he was the unsuccessful Democratic nominee against Republican Thomas Brackett Reed.

In May 1865, Cleaves married Caroline Howard, the daughter of judge Joseph Howard. She died in 1875 in Augusta while Cleaves was serving in the House of Representatives. He was an active member of the Cathedral Church of St. Luke. He died in September 1892 from Bright's disease at the Falmouth Hotel and was buried at Evergreen Cemetery.
