= Scott M. Black =

American investor, philanthropist and art collector

- Education: Johns Hopkins University; Harvard Business School
- Occupation: Investor

Scott M. Black is an American investor, philanthropist and art collector. He founded Delphi Management, a leading money management firm whose notable clients include former mayor of New York, Michael Bloomberg.

== Biography ==
=== Early life ===
Scott M. Black grew up in Portland, Maine where his father was a grocer. He graduated from Johns Hopkins University with a degree in Applied Mathematics and Economics. Following graduation, he attended Harvard Business School.

=== Career ===
He worked in corporate finance and international treasury positions at Joseph E. Seagram and Xerox before moving to Merrill Lynch where he became head of Corporate development. He also worked at William O'Neil & Company prior to founding Delphi Management in 1980.

He serves on the advisory boards of the John F. Kennedy School of Government, Johns Hopkins University, Northeastern University, the Museum of Fine Arts (Boston) and the Portland Museum of Art. Mr. Black has endowed several funds and chairs at Johns Hopkins University including the Black Chair in Economics, the Scott M. Black Scholarship Fund and the Scott Black Fund for Teaching. Mr. Black and his wife Isabelle Black dedicated the Scott and Isabelle Black wing of the Lidow Physics center at Technion Institute in 2007. Mr. Black and his wife also have a family fellowship at Harvard University for students in the Harvard Kennedy School.

He has an extensive collection of Impressionist, post-Impressionist and early modern paintings and sculpture. His collection is displayed at the Portland Museum of Art, the Museum of Fine Arts (Boston), and other museums.

== See also ==
- "The Scott M. Black Collection". Archived from the original on 2010-11-27.
