= John Kimball Sr. =

American architect

John Kimball
- Born: October 15, 1758; Ipswich, Province of Massachusetts Bay
- Died: October 30, 1831 (aged 73); Waterford, Maine, U.S.
- Occupation: Architect
- Spouse: Susanna Knight
- Buildings: McLellan-Sweat Mansion

John Kimball (October 15, 1758 – October 30, 1831) was an American architect and housewright.

== Early life ==
Kimball was born in Ipswich, Province of Massachusetts Bay, in 1758.

== Career ==
Kimball moved to Portland, Maine, from Newburyport, Massachusetts, in 1791, although it is believed he worked in Portland as early as 1786. In 1800, he designed the McLellan–Sweat Mansion. He also designed the city's Quinby House and Fickett House.

== Personal life ==
Kimball married Susanna Knight in 1781. They had ten children between 1783 and 1802, and moved to Waterford, Maine, in 1810, where Kimball was a farmer for the remainder of his life. His son, William, died a year after the family's relocation, having been on a foreign voyage. Another son, Joseph, had died at sea in 1808, while Moses died in Waterford in 1796 at the age of eleven months.

He was the grandfather of Maine artist Charles Frederick Kimball (1831–1903), son of John Kimball Jr.

== Death ==
Kimball died in 1831, aged 73. He was interred in Elm Vale Cemetery in South Waterford, Maine, alongside his wife, who predeceased him by four years.
