= Lorenzo De Medici Sweat =

American politician

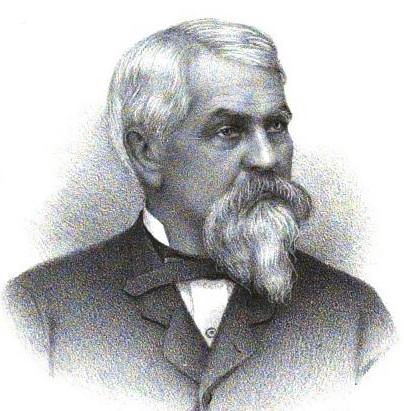

Member of the U.S. House of Representatives from Maine's 1st district
- In office March 4, 1863 – March 3, 1865
- Preceded by: John N. Goodwin
- Succeeded by: John Lynch

Personal details
- Born: May 26, 1818 Parsonsfield, Massachusetts (now Maine), U.S.
- Died: July 26, 1898 (aged 80) Portland, Maine, U.S.
- Resting place: Evergreen Cemetery
- Party: Democratic
- Spouse: Margaret Jane Mussey
- Children: none
- Education: Bowdoin College; Harvard Law School
- Profession: Attorney

Lorenzo De Medici Sweat (May 26, 1818 – July 26, 1898), also written L.D.M. Sweat, was a U.S. representative from Maine.

== Early life and education ==
He was born in the town of Parsonsfield in the Massachusetts District of Maine, where he attended Parsonsfield Seminary, a Free Will Baptist school. Sweat attended Bowdoin College, from which he graduated in 1837, and studied law with Rufus McIntire. He attended Harvard Law School, and after graduating in 1840 he was admitted to the bar and practiced law in New Orleans.

== Marriage and family ==
Sweat returned to Maine and settled in Portland, where he continued to practice law. In 1849, he married novelist Margaret Jane Mussey and purchased a home adjoining author and critic, John Neal. The couple did not have children. In 1862, while a sitting member of Congress, Sweat formed a law practice with Nathan Cleaves.

== Political career ==
Sweat held various local offices including Portland City Solicitor from 1856 to 1860. He served as a member of the Maine State Senate from 1861 to 1862.

He was elected as a Democrat to the Thirty-eighth Congress and served from March 4, 1863, to March 3, 1865. Being the only Democrat in Maine's congressional delegation, he was the only one to oppose the Thirteenth Amendment. He was defeated for reelection in 1864, and was an unsuccessful candidate for election to Congress in 1866.

He later was a delegate to the Union National Convention held in Philadelphia in 1868, and to the 1872 Democratic National Convention. In 1872 he was selected as a member of the Democratic National Committee. He served until 1876.

He was an honorary commissioner to the World's Exposition in Paris in 1867 and that in Vienna in 1873.

His house in Portland, the McLellan-Sweat Mansion, was later adapted for use as the Portland Museum of Art, following a bequest by his wife in 1908. The same bequest also included funding for what became the L. D. M. Sweat Memorial Galleries as an addition to the rear. The house was designated a National Historic Landmark in 1970.

He is interred in Evergreen Cemetery in Portland, Maine.

U.S. House of Representatives
| Preceded by John N. Goodwin | Member of the U.S. House of Representatives from Maine's 1st congressional district March 4, 1863 – March 3, 1865 | Succeeded by John Lynch |
