= Ladue (surname) =

Ladue or LaDue is a French-American surname. It is the Americanized version of Ledoux, which literally means "the sweet". According to the 2010 United States Census, Ladue is the 12941^{st} most common surname in the United States, belonging to 2374 individuals. Ladue is most common among White (91.45%) individuals.

== People ==
- Florence LaDue (1883–1951), American rodeo performer
- Jay LaDue (1827–1926), American politician and farmer
- John Ladue (1804–1854), American politician
- Joseph Ladue (1855–1901), American businessman and prospector
- Paul LaDue (born 1992), American ice hockey player

== See also ==
- Ladue, Missouri
