= John Calvin Stevens House =

Historic house in Maine, United States

- U.S. National Register of Historic Places
- U.S. Historic district – Contributing property
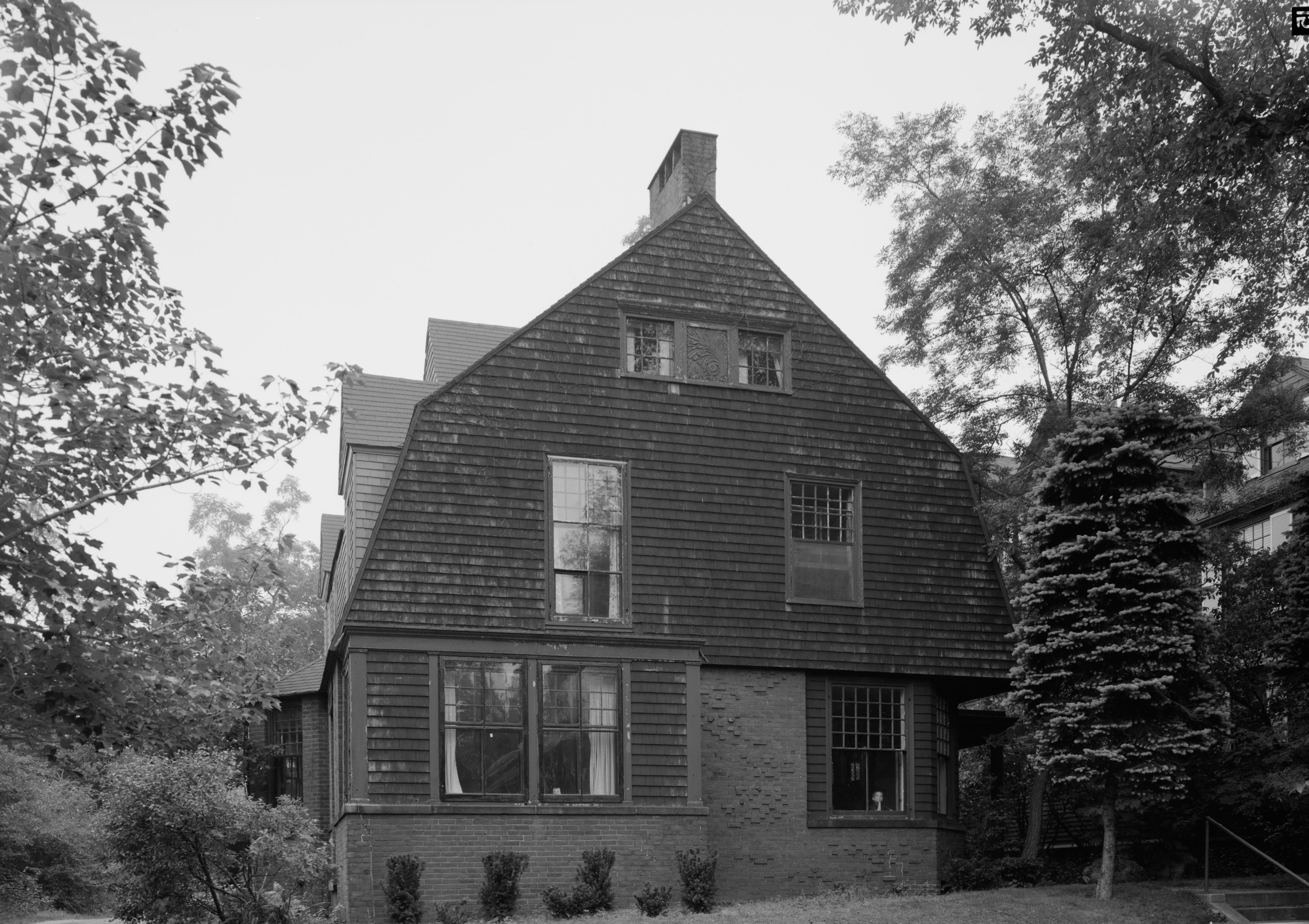
- Front of the John Calvin Stevens House in Portland, Maine.

- Location within Maine Location within the United States
- Location: 52 Bowdoin Street, Portland, Maine
- Coordinates: 43°38′48″N 70°16′30″W
- Area: 1 acre (0.40 ha)
- Built: 1884
- Architect: John Calvin Stevens
- Architectural style: Shingle Style
- Part of: Western Promenade Historic District (ID84001363)
- NRHP reference No.: 73000125

Significant dates
- Added to NRHP: July 16, 1973
- Designated CP: February 16, 1984

The John Calvin Stevens House is an historic house at 52 Bowdoin Street in the West End neighborhood of Portland, Maine. Built in 1884, it was the home of architect John Calvin Stevens, and was one of Portland's earliest examples of Shingle style architecture. The house was prominently used by Stevens in promotion of the style, and was listed on the National Register of Historic Places in 1973.

== Description and history ==
The Stevens House is set on the south side of Bowdoin Street, abutting Portland's Western Cemetery to the south, and a short way east of the Western Promenade. The house is 2 1/2 stories, with a rusticated brick first floor topped by a large gambrel roof, which shelters a full second story and an attic level. The gable ends are finished in wooden shingles. The north-facing main facade originally had the main entrance, sheltered by a slightly projecting porch at the left corner, but this has been enclosed, and the main entrance is now on the west side. The windows at the attic level of the north side are square fixed-pane units, with a decorative panel between. The east and west facades each have a large wall-plane dormer, with smaller gabled dormers projecting from the upper slope of the roof. The current entrance is sheltered by a rectangular porch, and opens into what was originally the dining room. Although some of its spaces have been repurposed and altered over time, the house retains many original finishes.

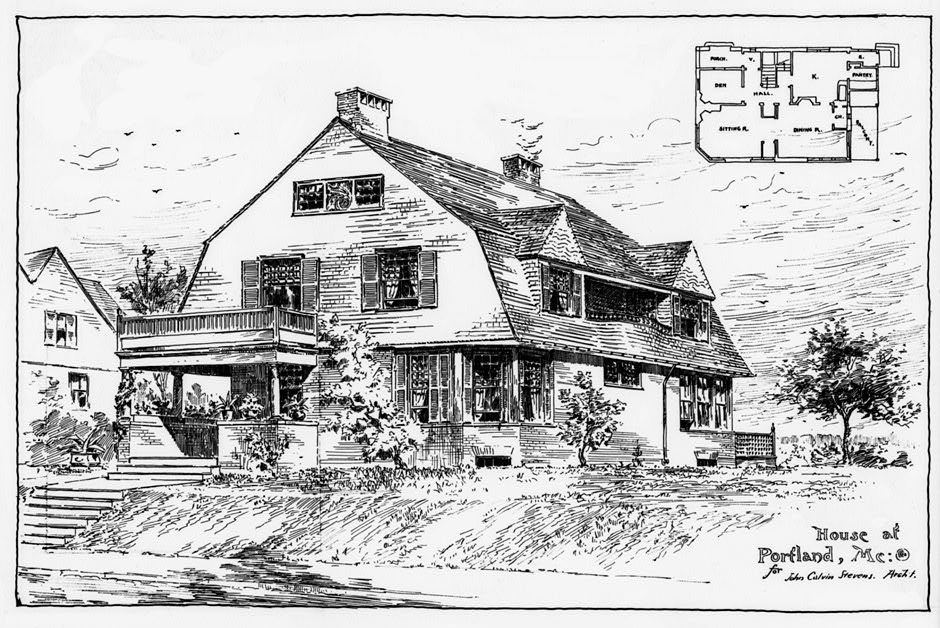
John Calvin Stevens house, Portland, ME (1883-84). Illustration from Examples of American Domestic Architecture (1889).

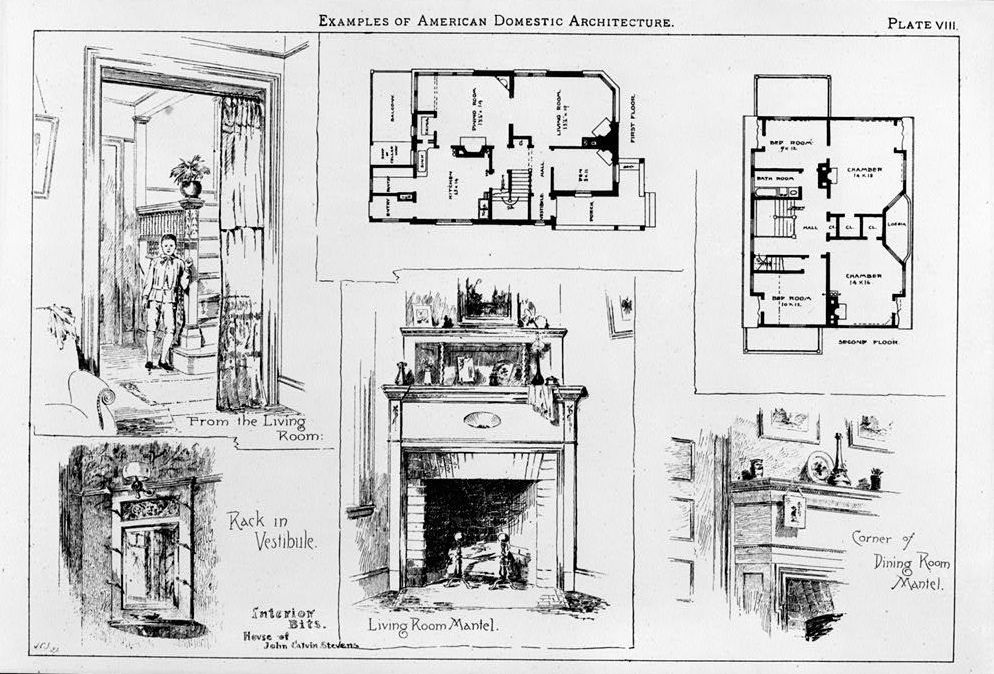
Plans and interior details.

The house was built in 1884 to a design by John Calvin Stevens, and was his home until 1919. Stevens and his architectural partner at the time, Albert Winslow Cobb, included illustrations of the house in their Shingle style survey, Examples of American Domestic Architecture, first published in 1886. It received international notice after its construction, with reviews by American Institute of Architects and The British Architect.

== See also ==
- National Register of Historic Places listings in Portland, Maine
