= Bernard C. Meyers =

American photographer

- Born: 1955 (age 70–71); United States
- Education: RIT
- Known for: Photography, Abstract Art
- Website: bernardcmeyers.com

Bernard C. Meyers is an American abstract contemporary artist, photographer, and educator. He is most known for his abstract art and for his focus on the art of printmaking – traditional printmaking, etching and lithography, mono-prints, montage and photography – as well as commercial photography specializing in architecture, environmental portraits and art reproduction. Meyer's work has been collected by the Portland Museum of Art and the High Museum of Art's Bunnen Collection, and was highlighted in Amy Jorgensen's A Survey of Contemporary Photography in Utah. He was on the faculty at the University of Southern Maine and the University of New England for 22 years, and has been teaching at Utah's Waterford School as of 2021.

Meyers was selected as an artist-in-residence at the Utah Museum of Contemporary Art for the 2021–2020 season, "explor[ing] the intersections of photographic realism and abstract expressionism."
