= Smith College Museum of Art =

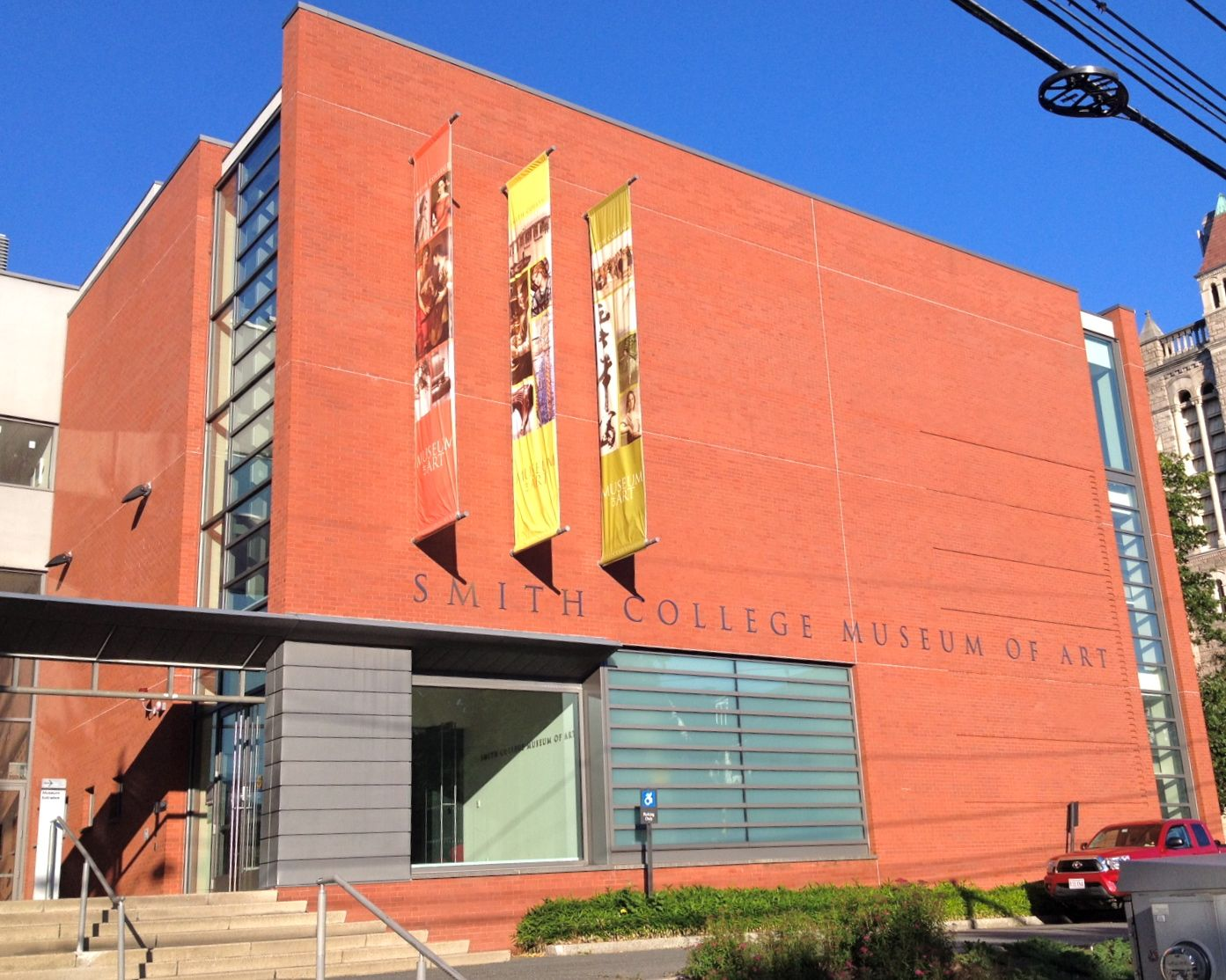
- View of the Smith College Museum of Art in 2014.
- Established: 1870; 156 years ago
- Location: 20 Elm Street; Northampton, Massachusetts
- Coordinates: 42.3185°N 72.6364°W
- Type: Art museum
- Accreditation: American Alliance of Museums
- Director: Jessica Nicoll
- Architect: Polshek Partnership Architects
- Owner: Smith College
- Website: Official website

The Smith College Museum of Art, abbreviated SCMA, is the art museum of Smith College, located in Northampton, Massachusetts. First established in 1870, the museum is part of the American Alliance of Museums, Five College Consortium, and Museums10 consortiums.

Throughout the years, the museum collection has expanded to include nearly 25,000 works of art, including a diverse collection of non-Western art. The institution is widely known for its collection of American and European art of the nineteenth and twentieth centuries, including works by Albert Bierstadt, Paul Cézanne, Jean-Baptiste-Camille Corot, Gustave Courbet, Edgar Degas, Claude Monet, John Singer Sargent, Georges Seurat, and representation of many other notable artists.

== History ==
The Smith College Museum of Art was first established in 1870, and has been led by many notable directors over the years, including Jere Abbott, Henry-Russell Hitchcock, Charles Percy Parkhurst, and Jessica Nicoll.

The Brown Fine Arts Center opened in 2003 after a two-year, $35 million building renovation, and now houses the art library, Art Department, as well as the Smith College Museum of Art. Designed by the New York-based Polshek Partnership Architects, the 164,000-gross-square-foot (15,236m^{2}) building was created to link the college with its neighboring community.

Housed in the Brown Center, the Art Department of Smith College offers art history degrees, first initiated by President Laurenus Clark Seelye in the 1870s, has evolved to become one of the most respected programs in American undergraduate education. Notable faculty members have included Harriet Boyd Hawes, Oliver Larkin, Charles Rufus Morey, Phyllis Williams Lehmann, and Edgar Wind. At the tenth Comité International d'Histoire de l'Art, which took place in Rome in 1912, Smith was one of the only sixty-eight American institutions of higher learning with a professorship in art history. The museum is often utilized as a learning space for students, especially those who enroll in art-related courses.

== Collections ==
The Smith College Museum of Art has an extensive collection, which includes paintings, sculptures, works on paper, antiquities, decorative arts from diverse cultures around the world. The museum has four floors of galleries that house the permanent collection, as well as the Cunningham Center for the Study of Prints, Drawings and Photographs. The center houses more than 1,600 drawings and over 5,700 photographs spanning the history of the museum, and an extensive collection of more than 8,000 prints by old masters to contemporary printmakers. In addition, the museum also features two bathrooms designed by artists Ellen Driscoll and Sandy Skoglund to represent functional art.

Reflective of diverse student body of the college and campaigns to raise awareness of underrepresented groups of women, the museum has been actively procuring artworks by female artists and female artists of color. Notable figures represented include Carmen Lomas Garza, Susan Rothenberg, Betye Saar, and Marja Vallila.

== Notable directors ==
- Alfred Vance Churchill (1905–1932)
- Jere Abbott (1932–1946)
- Henry-Russell Hitchcock (1949–1955)
- Charles Scott Chetham (1962–1988)
- Charles Percy Parkhurst (1990–1991)
- Suzannah Fabing (1992–2005)
- Jessica Nicoll (2005–present)

== See also ==
- List of art museums
- List of museums in Massachusetts
- List of university museums in the United States
