= John Calvin Stevens =

American architect

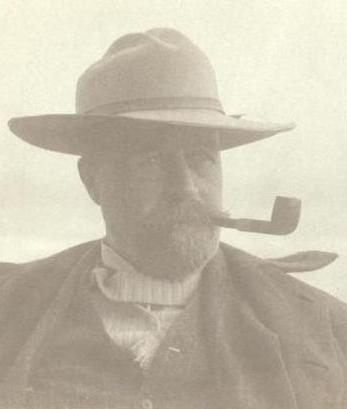
- Born: October 8, 1855; Boston, Massachusetts
- Died: January 25, 1940 (aged 84); Portland, Maine
- Occupation: Architect
- Parent(s): Maria Jane Hancock Wingate; Leander Stevens
- Awards: Congressional Record of Recognition (2009)
- Buildings: State Street Church, Portland, ME; Richard Webb House, Portland, ME; Municipal Building, Skowhegan, ME; L. D. M. Sweat Memorial Galleries, Portland, ME; Saco Museum, Saco, ME; Forest Avenue Post Office, Portland, ME

John Calvin Stevens (October 8, 1855 – January 25, 1940) was an American architect who worked in the Shingle Style, in which he was a major innovator, and the Colonial Revival style. He designed more than 1,000 buildings in the state of Maine.

== Early life ==
Stevens was the son of Maria Wingate and Leander Stevens, a cabinet maker and builder of fancy carriages. He was born in Boston, Massachusetts, but when he was two, his family moved to Portland, Maine.

Stevens wanted to study architecture at the Massachusetts Institute of Technology, but lacked the money to attend. Instead, he apprenticed in the Portland office of architect Francis H. Fassett, who in 1880 made him a junior partner to open the firm's new Boston office. Another architect working in the same building was William Ralph Emerson, whose historicist aesthetic in the Queen Anne Style had a profound effect on Stevens. He married Martha Louise Waldron in 1877, and they had four children. Stevens opened his own office in Portland in 1884.

=== Career ===
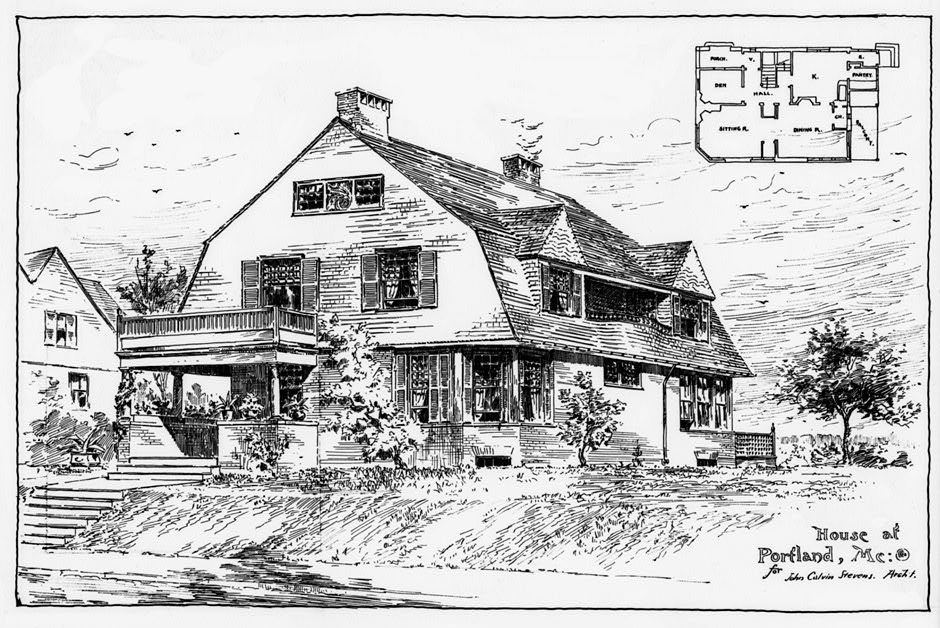
John Calvin Stevens house, Portland, ME (1883–84)

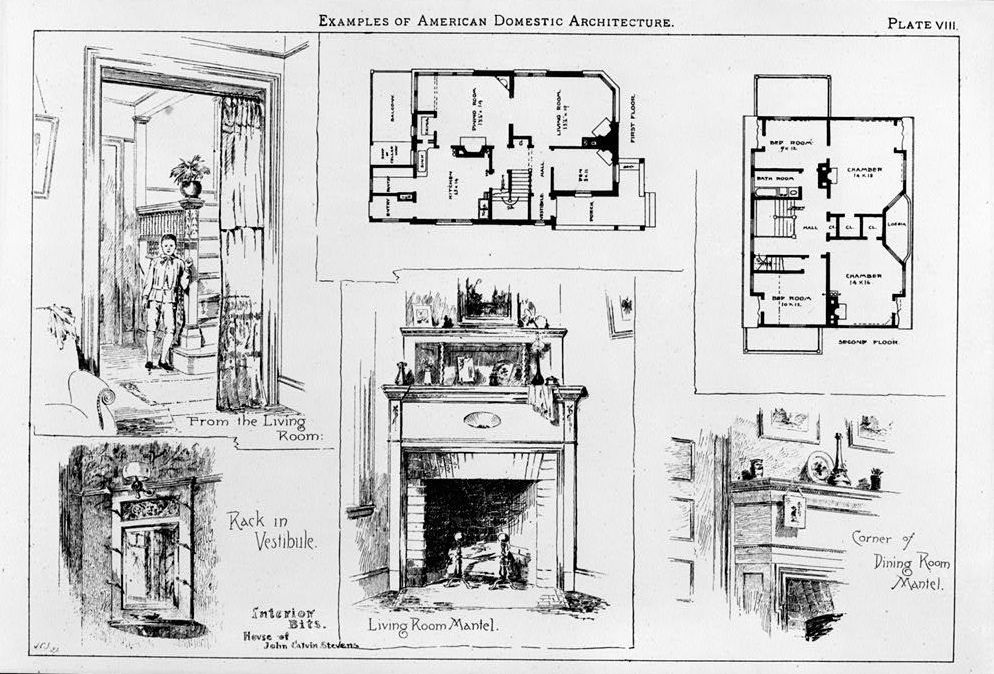
Floor plans and interior details

In 1888, Stevens formed a partnership with Albert Winslow Cobb. Together they wrote the book Examples of American Domestic Architecture (1889), an early study of the Shingle Style. Cobb wrote the prose and Stevens provided the illustrations. The partnership was dissolved in 1891. Stevens' son, John Howard Stevens, became an architect and joined his father's firm in 1898. John became a full partner in 1904, and the firm was renamed Stevens Architects.

His most-acclaimed early house, the 1886 James Hopkins Smith House in Falmouth Foreside, Maine, was featured in George William Sheldon's Artistic Country Seats (1886–87). In The Shingle Style (1955), Vincent Scully described the Smith house as a "pièce de résistance" and a "masterpiece", "a more sweeping and coherent version of Stevens' own house". Sheldon also praised his "powerful alterations" to a summer hotel called the Poland Springs House.

Houses designed by Stevens can be found along the Maine coast, as well as in Portland (particularly the West End) and its suburbs. He also designed public libraries, municipal buildings, hotels, and churches, as well as nine buildings for the campus of Hebron Academy, including the Psi Upsilon Fraternity House on the Bowdoin College campus.

In one of his rare commissions outside of Maine, he created a master plan for and designed a chapel and at least six barracks buildings at the National Home for Disabled Volunteer Soldiers (Southern Branch) in Hampton, Virginia.

=== Other interests ===
Stevens was a landscape painter. He belonged to the Brushians, a Portland art group which went on weekend outings. He exhibited his work with the Boston Art Club, the Portland Society of Art, and elsewhere. His oil painting Delano Park, Cape Elizabeth (1904) is in the collection of Blaine House, the Maine governor's official residence.

He was an avid art collector. He lent Afternoon Fog by Winslow Homer to the L. D. M. Sweat Memorial Galleries, now part of the Portland Museum of Art.

In 1889, Stevens was named a Fellow of the American Institute of Architects.

== Death and legacy ==
Stevens died on January 25, 1940, aged 84. He is buried in Portland's Evergreen Cemetery.

In recognition of his architectural contributions on the Portland peninsula, the city declared October 8, 2009, to be John Calvin Stevens Day. The ceremony included a Congressional Record of Recognition presented by the office of Senator Olympia Snowe.

== Selected buildings ==
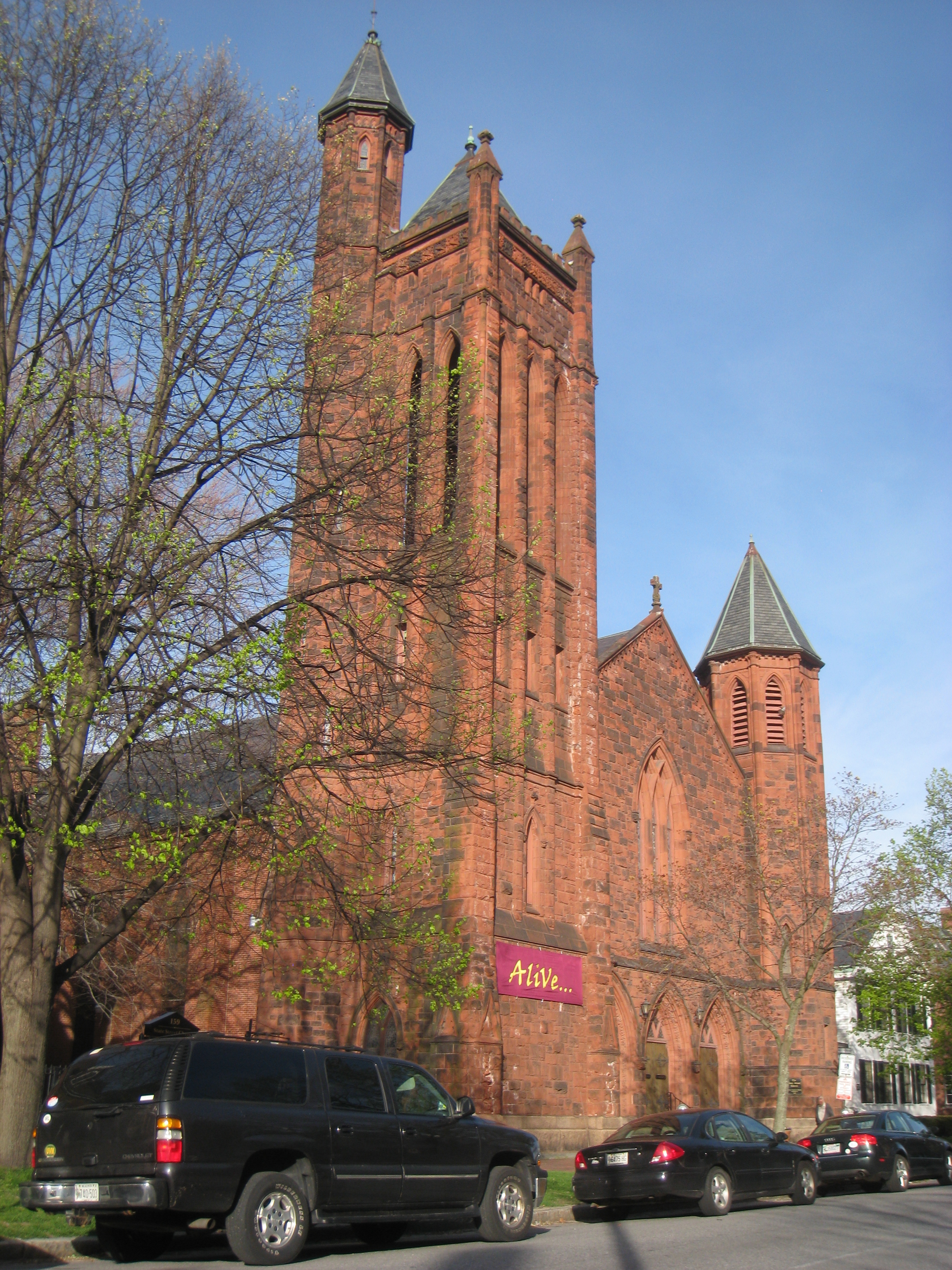
State Street Congregational Church, Portland, ME (1892–93). Stevens wrapped the existing wooden church in sandstone and added the Gothic tower and facade.

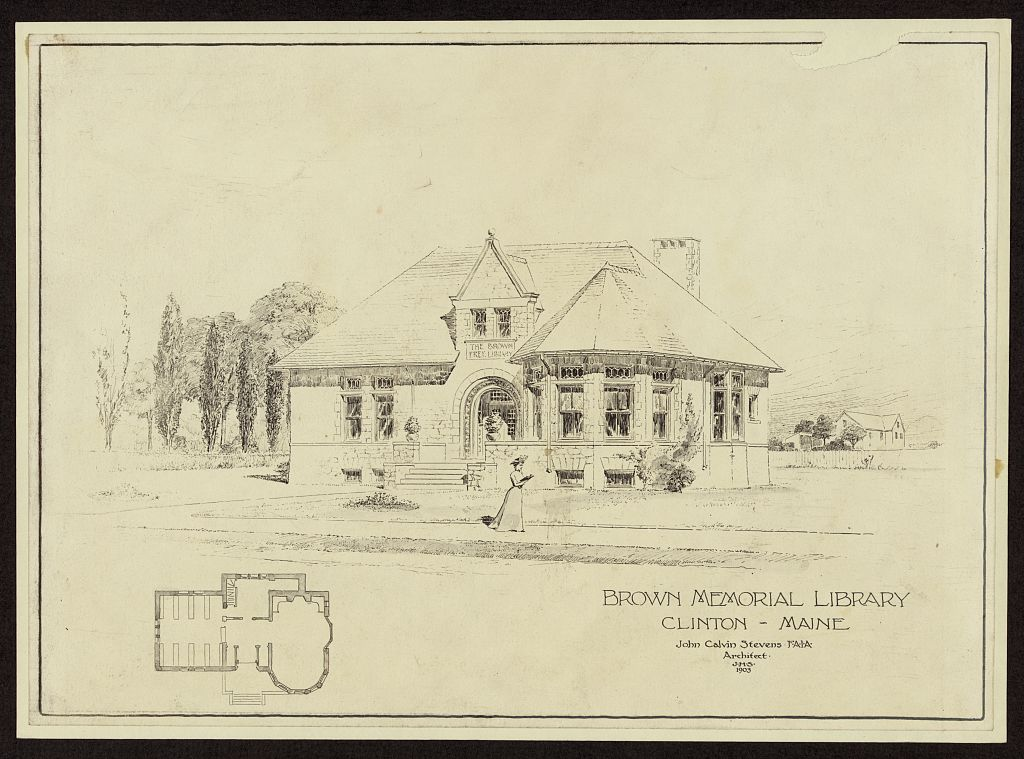
Brown Memorial Library, Clinton, ME (1903)

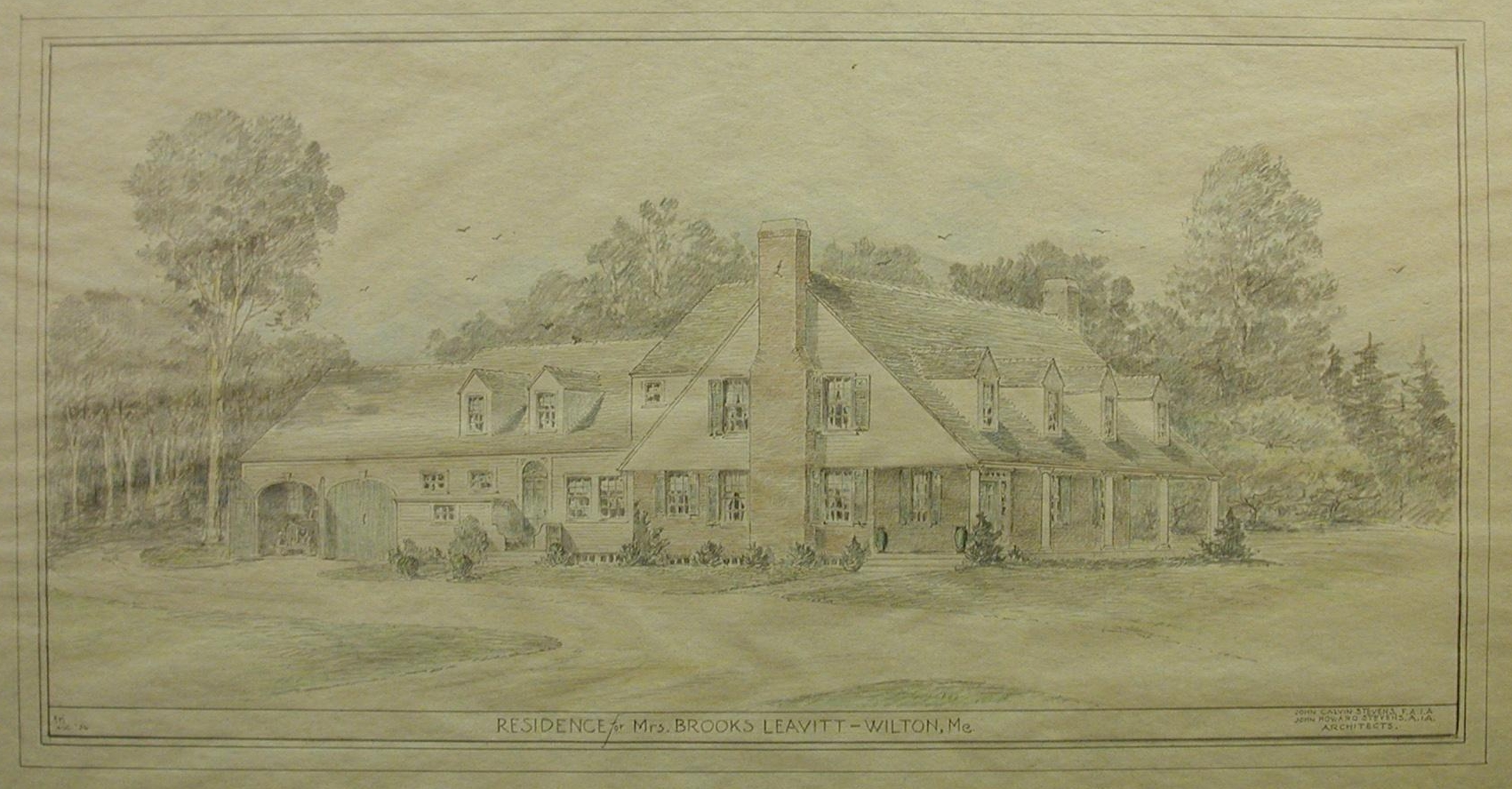
Brooks Leavitt house, Wilton, ME (c.1925)

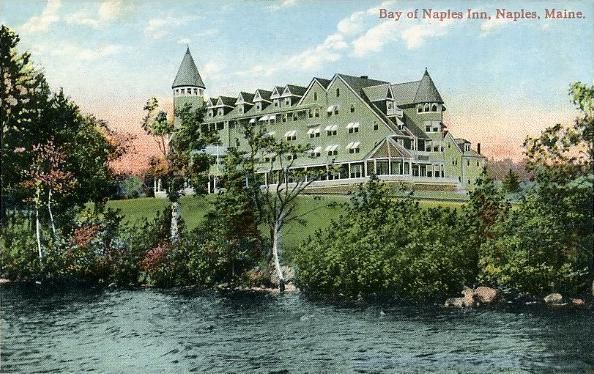
Bay of Naples Inn, Naples, ME (1899, demolished 1964)

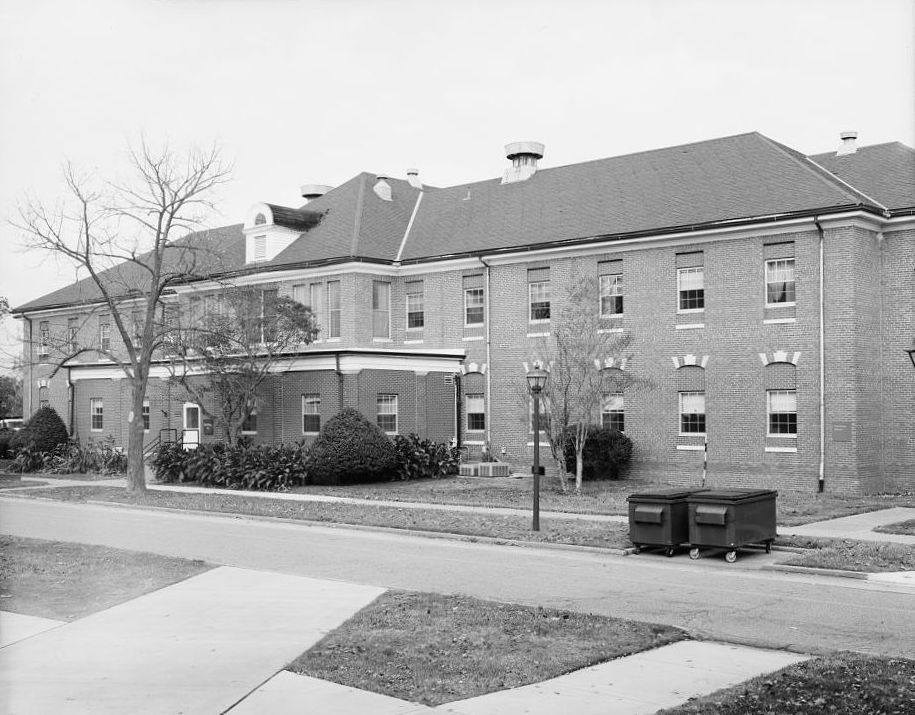
Building 70, National Home for Disabled Volunteer Soldiers ("Southern Branch"), Hampton, VA (1908)

=== Churches ===
- Congregational Church, Berlin, New Hampshire (1882), Fassett & Stevens, architects
- Sanford Baptist Church, Sanford, Maine (1888), Stevens & Cobb, architects
- First Baptist Church, Yarmouth, Maine (1889)
- First Baptist Church, 47 Church St., Gardiner, Maine (1890), Stevens & Cobb, architects
- Alterations to State Street Congregational Church, Portland, Maine (1892–93)
- Freeport Baptist Church, Freeport, Maine (1896)
- Hancock Point Chapel, Hancock, Maine (c.1900)
- Parish House, Williston Congregational Church (now Williston-West Church, UCC), Portland, Maine (1904)

=== Libraries ===
- Zadoc Long Free Library, Buckfield, Maine (1900–01)
- Brown Memorial Library, Clinton, Maine (1899)
- Rumford Falls Library, Rumford, Maine (1903)
- Cary Library, Houlton, Maine (1903–04)
- Knight Library, Waterford, Maine (1911–12)
- Davis Memorial Library, Limington, Maine (1912)
- Charles M. Bailey Public Library, Winthrop, Maine (1916)
- Paris Public Library, South Paris, Maine (c.1925)
- Bethel Public Library, Bethel, Maine (1937–38)

=== Houses ===
- A. R. Wright cottage, Pine Point, Scarborough, Maine (c.1881), Fassett & Stevens, architects
- John Calvin Stevens House, 52 Bowdoin St., Portland, Maine (c.1883–84, altered)
- Winslow Homer house and studio, Prouts Neck, Maine (c.1884)
- Brown-Donahue house, Delano Park, Cape Elizabeth, Maine (c.1885–86)
- James Hopkins Smith house, 143 Foreside Rd., Falmouth Foreside, Maine (1886, altered)
- Additions to "Thornhurst," General John Marshall Brown house, Falmouth Foreside, Maine (pre-1888)
- "Belfield," Henry St. John Smith house, Cape Elizabeth, Maine (c.1890 altered)
- Captain John W. Deering house, Kennebunkport, Maine (c.1890), Stevens & Cobb, architects
- "Bonnie Brae," Erskine H. Bronson house, Kennebunkport, Maine (c.1895–96)
- "Braemar Cottage," Edwin Packard house, Kennebunkport, Maine (c.1897)
- "Endcliffe," Frederick W. Moss house, Kennebunkport, Maine (c.1897–99)
- Henry Merrill house, Munjoy Hill, Portland, Maine (c.1898)
- "Ledge Rock", Prouts Neck, Maine
- Wil C. Johnson house, Hallowell, Maine (c.1899)
- "Oak Bank," Cumberland Foreside, Maine (c.1900)
- Psi Upsilon Fraternity House, Bowdoin College, Brunswick, Maine (c.1900–03) Now a student residence known as Quinby House
- Governor John Freemont Hill house, Augusta, Maine (c.1901–02) Now St. Paul Center, Catholic Charities Maine
- Edward W. Cox house, 111 West St., Portland, Maine (c.1905)
- Richard Webb house, 29 Bowdoin St., Portland, Maine (c.1906–07)
- Professor George W. Files house, Brunswick, Maine (c.1910)
- "Shorelands," Edward M. Hagar house, Camden, Maine (c.1912)
- Charles Fox house (now Oxford House Inn), Fryeburg, Maine (c.1913)
- "Elmhurst," John S. Hyde house, Bath, Maine (c.1913–14) Now Hyde School, Bath campus
- "Channelside," Frederick & Daisy Walker House Cape Elizabeth, Maine (c.1914)
- Louisa Spring house, 305 Danforth St., Portland, Maine (c.1920)
- "Stone House," Stanley Wood house (now Stone House Conference Center, University of Southern Maine), 642 Wolf Neck Rd., Freeport, Maine (1922)
- L. Brooks Leavitt house, Wilton, Maine (c.1925)
- Warren F Pope House, East Machias, Maine 1897
- William H. Roberts, Jr. house, Parkside, Portland, Maine (c.1898)

Remodel of Brewster house, Dexter Maine c.1932. Home of former Maine Gov and US Congressman/Senator Ralph Owen Brewster and his wife Dorothy (Foss). Currently a B&B, The Brewster Inn.

=== Other buildings ===
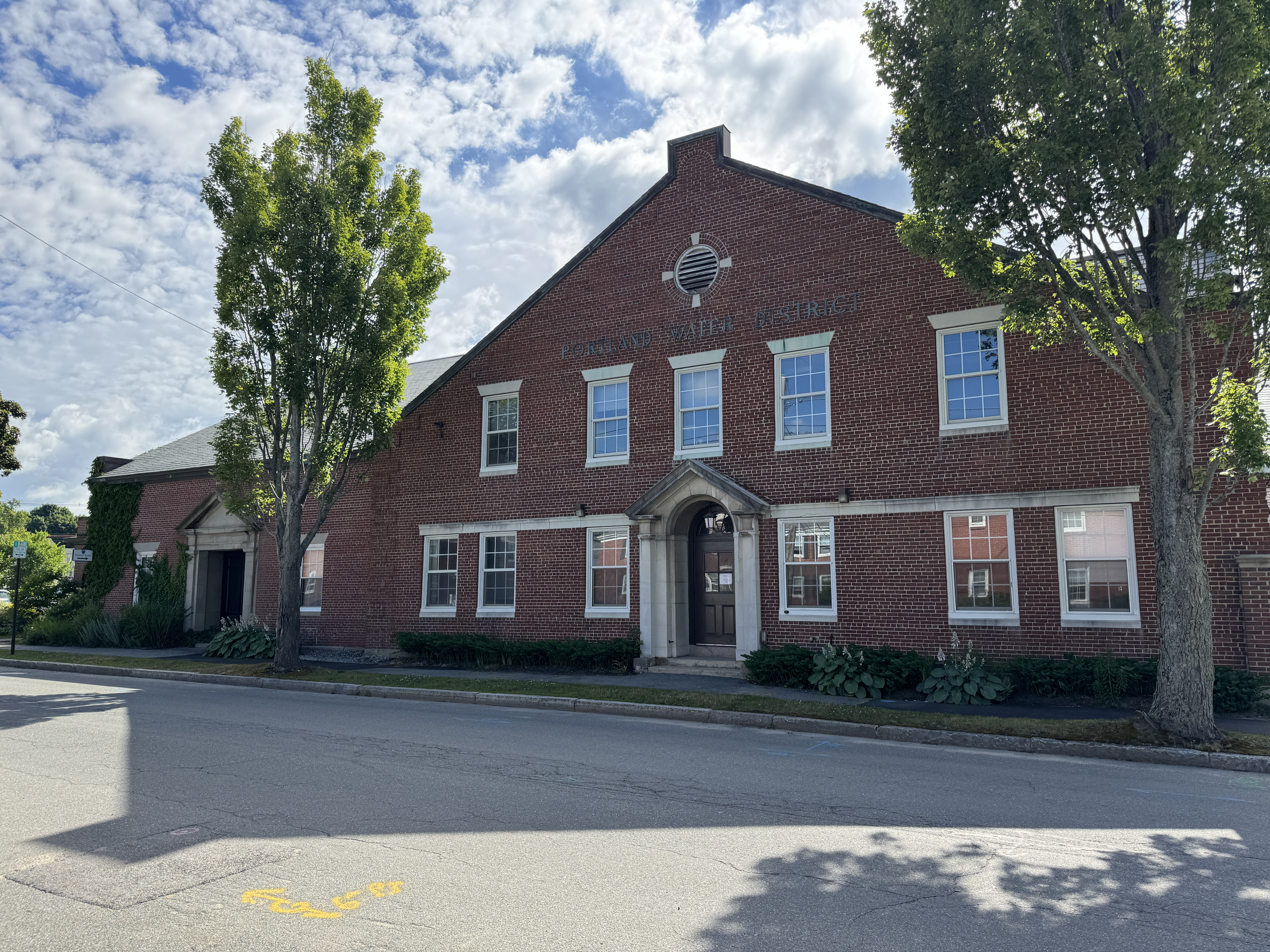
Portland Water District Building

- The Breakwater Court hotel (now The Colony Hotel), Kennebunkport, Maine (1914)
- "The Shelter" (gazebo), Cushing's Island, Maine (1886, restored 2001)
- Alterations to Poland Spring House, Poland, Maine (c.1888–91), Cobb & Stevens, architects
- Sturtevant Hall, Hebron Academy, Greenwood, Maine (1891)
- Biddeford City Hall and Biddeford's City Theater, Biddeford, Maine (1895–96) Rebuilt by Stevens after a December 1894 fire
- Riverton Trolley Park Casino, Portland, Maine (1896)
- Cape Cottage Casino, Cape Elizabeth, Maine (1898–99)
- Bay of Naples Inn, Naples, Maine (1899, demolished 1964)
- New Belvidere Inn (now Tides Inn-by-the-Sea), Kennebunkport, Maine (1899)
- Belgrade Hotel, Belgrade Lakes, Maine (c. 1900, burned 1956)
- Master plan, chapel and barracks buildings, National Home for Disabled Volunteer Soldiers ("Southern Branch"), Hampton, Virginia (1906–08)
- Nathan Clifford Elementary School, Portland, Maine (1907)
- Municipal Building and Opera House, Skowhegan, Maine (1907–09)
- L. D. M. Sweat Memorial Galleries, Portland Museum of Art, Portland, Maine (1910)
- Camden Yacht Club, Camden, Maine (1912)
- Alterations and Annex to The North School, Portland, Maine (1921)
- Pike Memorial Building (Town Hall), Cornish, Maine (1925)
- York Institute (now Saco Museum), Saco, Maine (1926)
- Portland Water District Building, Portland, Maine (1928)
- Forest Avenue Post Office, Portland, Maine (1933–34)
- Albert Fells Cottage Jefferson, Maine (1937). Featuring a sleeping porch and piazza
- Uptown Theatre, Bath, Maine (1938)
- Sanford Country Club - Reconstructed barn into Club House (Bauneg Beg Country Club), Sanford, Maine (1924)

== Gallery ==
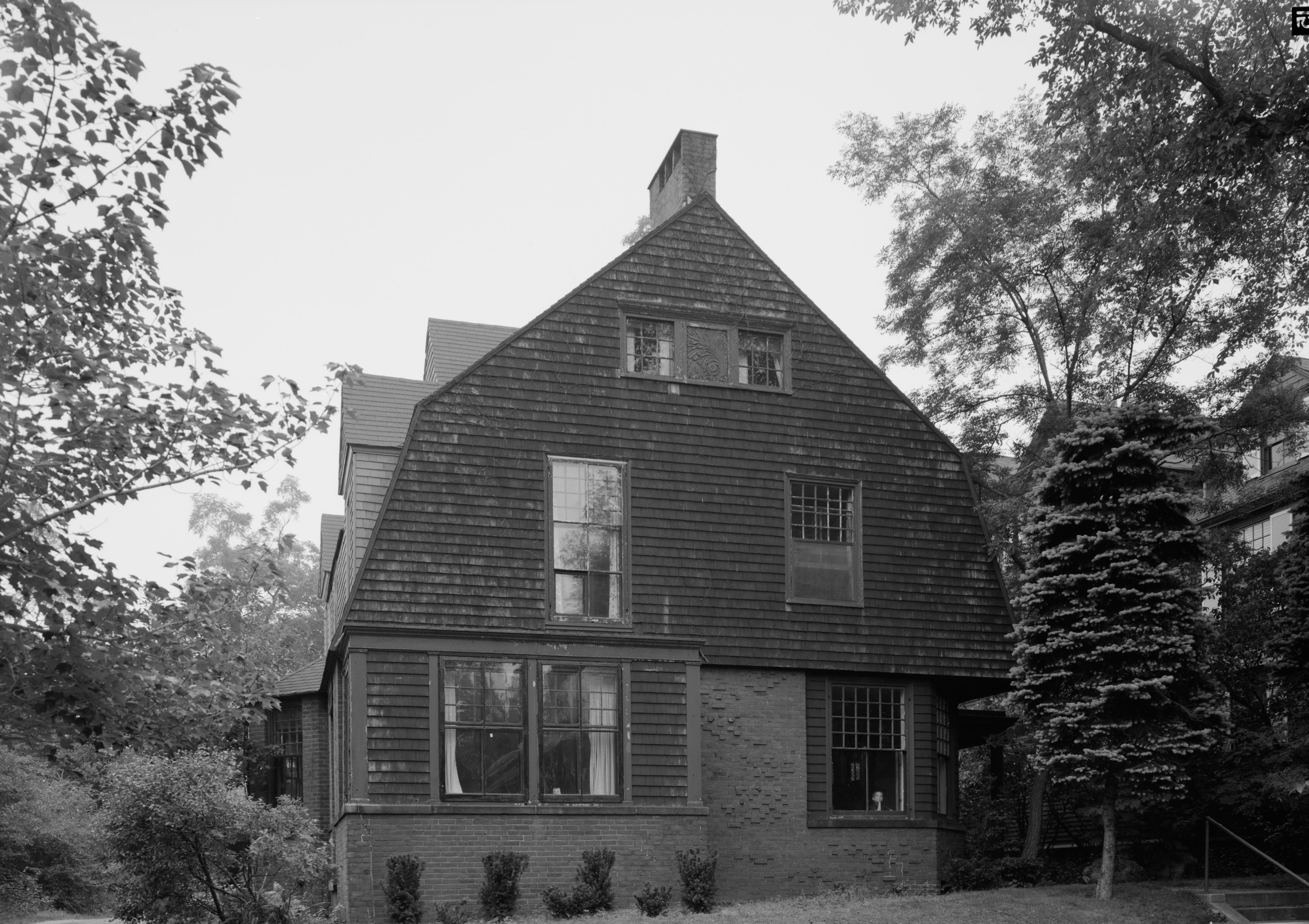
John Calvin Stevens House, Portland, ME (1883–84), in 1965. The box window, left, was originally the entrance porch.

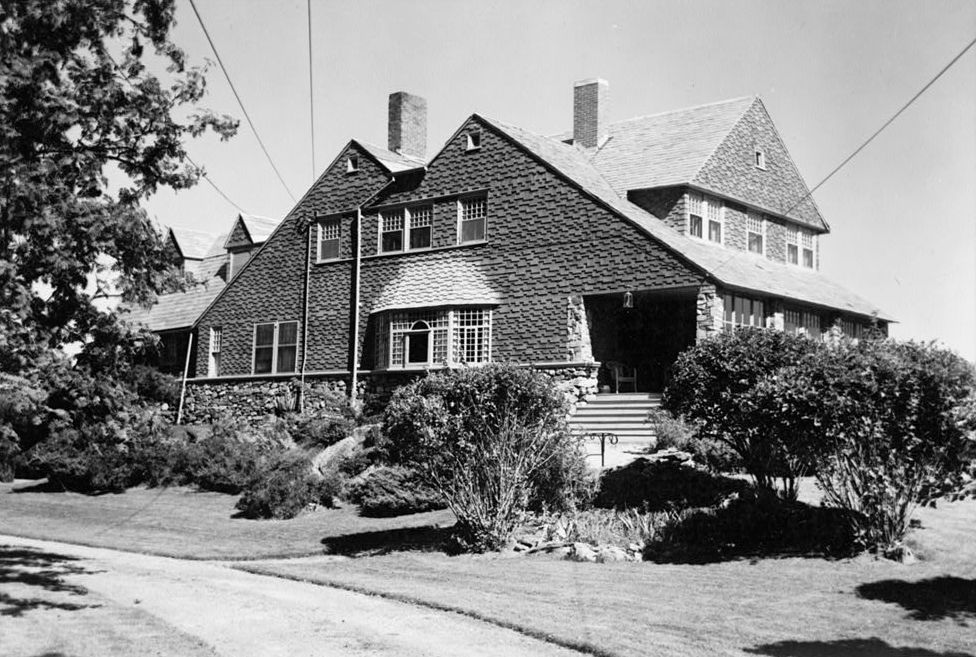
Brown-Donahue house, Delano Park, Cape Elizabeth, ME (1885–86)

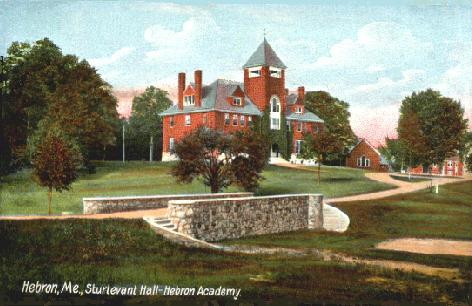
Sturtevant Hall, Hebron Academy, Greenwood, ME (1891). Stevens designed nine buildings at the school.

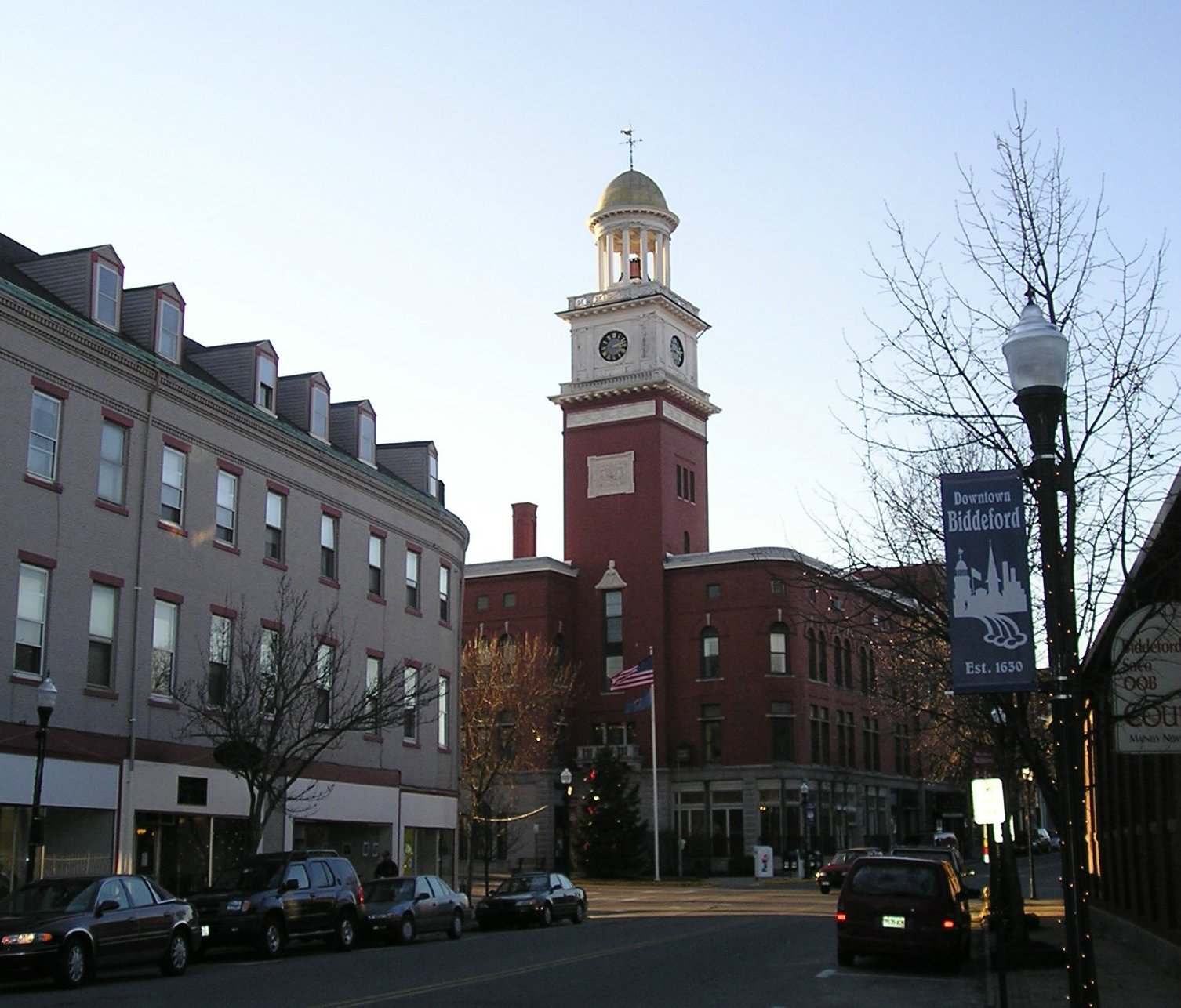
Biddeford City Hall, Biddeford, ME (1895–96)

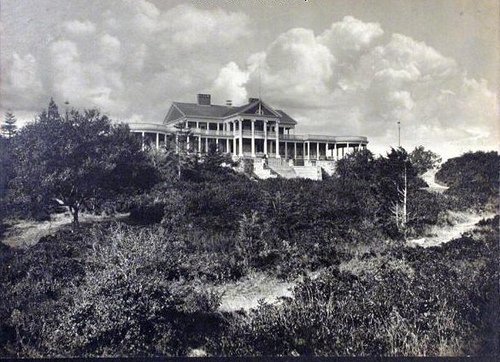
Cape Cottage Casino, Cape Elizabeth, ME (1898–99)

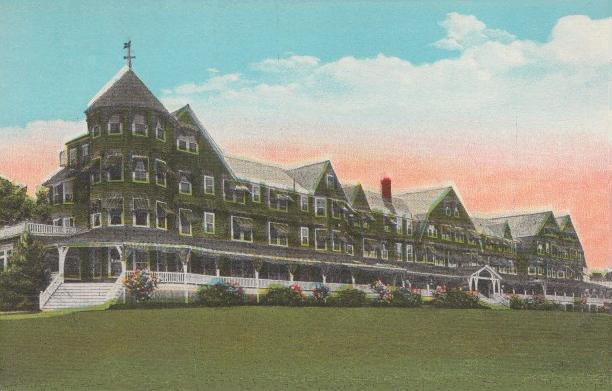
Belgrade Hotel, Belgrade Lakes, ME (c. 1900, burned 1956)

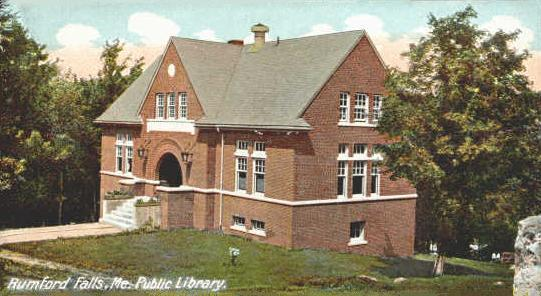
Rumford Falls Public Library, Rumford, ME (1903)

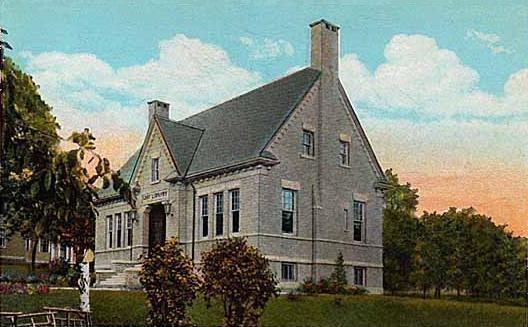
Cary Library, Houlton, ME (1903–04)

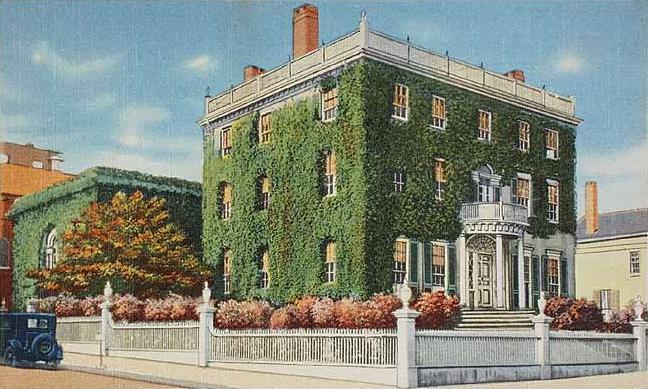
L. D. M. Sweat Memorial Galleries, Portland, ME (1910). Stevens's art gallery addition is at left.

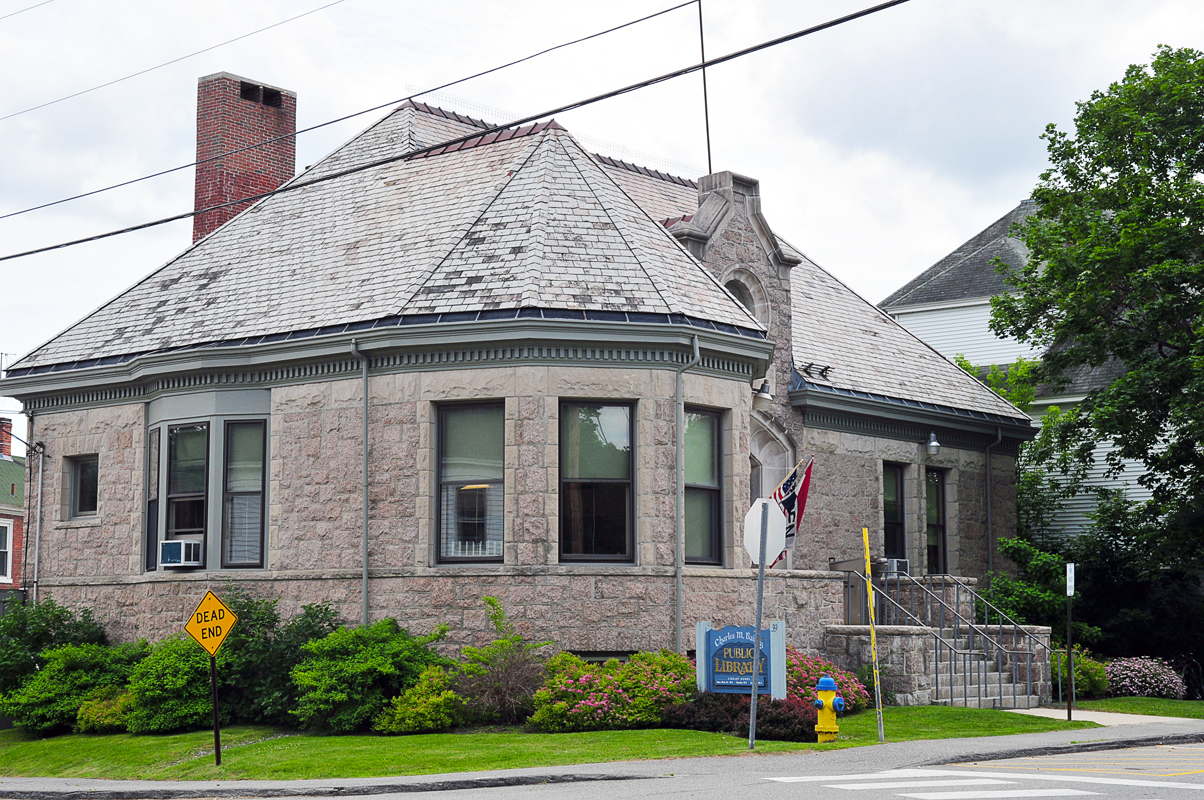
Charles M. Bailey Public Library, Winthrop, ME (1916)

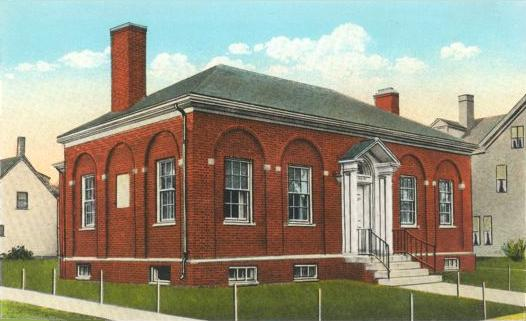
Paris Public Library, South Paris, ME (c.1925)
