= Margaret Jane Mussey Sweat =

American poet

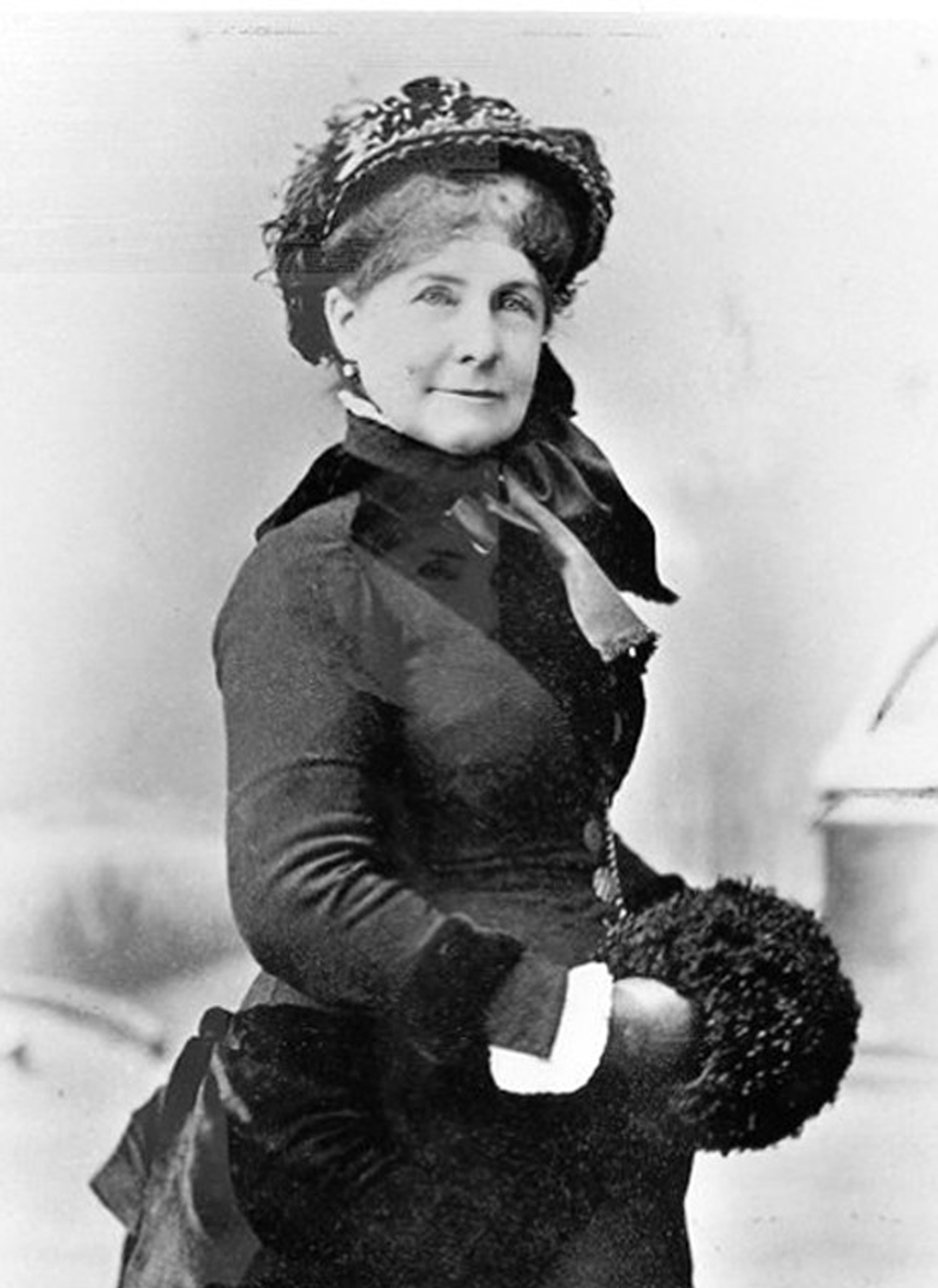
- Born: November 28, 1823; Portland, Maine
- Died: January 16, 1908 (aged 84)
- Education: Public School: Portland, Maine High School: Roxbury (Mass) Latin School
- Children: None
- Parent(s): John Mussey and Mehitable Smith Rana
- Writing career
- Notable work: Ethel's Love Life

Margaret Jane Mussey Sweat (1823–1908) was an American author, patron and reformer from Portland, Maine. Sweat received her education in Portland public schools and the Roxbury Latin School. Mussey married Lorenzo De Medici Sweat at age 26 in 1849 and began keeping a journal. Her husband was a lawyer; he graduated from Bowdoin College and served in the Maine Senate and then the United States House of Representatives (1863-1865). Their home, known as the Sweat Mansion, is now part of the Portland Museum of Art. The Sweats traveled all over the world. She was fluent in French, German, Italian, and Russian. Sweat was an avid philanthropist; she bequeathed their home and an additional 100,000 dollars to the Portland Society of Art to construct a building adjacent to her home for the museum. Many of her donations were to Bowdoin College, where both her husband and her father, John Mussey, graduated. A noted poet, journalist, and author, Sweat wrote the first American lesbian novel, Ethel's Love Life. She is buried at Evergreen Cemetery in her hometown of Portland.

== Early life ==
Sweat loved horseback riding and driving out in a chaise with her friends. She was an avid theatergoer; her regret was "the lack of a first rate theater in the city." She never missed a performance at local theaters. If she was not at the theater, she attended art exhibits, concerts, operas, and lectures. She often supported the women in these fields by inviting them back to her home and entertaining them. She left her home open for anyone. Sweat loved to cook; she wrote her own recipe books and prepared meals, typically on Sundays, that served a guaranteed 10 couples that she invited. She often had more guests due to her home being open to the public. A typical meal consisted of "tomato soup, broiled salmon with egg sauce, boiled lamb… roast chickens, ham, lobster salad, potatoes corn, steamed custards, strawberry and vanilla ices, charlotte russe, coffee, champagne."

After 1900, Sweat's life was divided into three cycles: June to early fall Portland, Maine; late fall and early winter was spent in Washington; and the entirety of winter and spring was spent traveling the world. Sweat never started her trips without first checking her own personal "Requisites for Traveling." Her list included:

"green tea, matches, teaspoon, knife, drinking cup, pocket mirror, ball of twine, and Etna. Cold tea is best drink in traveling. Claret and water next best. Leather strap to bind shawl and cloaks together. Arnica and laudanum."

Her summers in Portland involved attending the Gem Theater, picnics on Cape Elizabeth, Maine, and trips to the mountains. She moved in high social circles; she met with Alexander Graham Bell's wife, and attended a lecture by Susan B. Anthony. Surprisingly, Sweat was not a fan of Anthony's talk which she characterized as dull. She was also a prominent matron of Portland social circles. Sweat is described as a champion of various reform movements, including women's suffrage. From 1866, she served as vice-regent for Maine of the Mount Vernon Ladies' Association. The Annals of the Cobweb Club contributed to the Chimney Corner Club, two women's organizations to which Sweat was deeply connected.

== Author and poet ==
Sweat was an author, poet and journalist. She was the first woman book reviewer in New England. She had many favorable notices in newspapers; her book reviews often used the term "prudy." Sweat was associated with other Maine women writers including Elizabeth Oakes Smith, Sarah Payson Willis (Fanny Fern) and Elizabeth Akers Allen. Sweat's papers are in the Maine Women Writers Collection at the University of New England in Portland, Maine.

Sweat wrote a weekly column for a local Portland paper, the Augusta Correspondence. This column was an up-to-date report on legislative sessions and the troops of the Civil War. She was one of three women to edit the North American Review, and also contributed to it; her first paper was issued in 1856, Ethel's Love-Life (New York, 1859), and Highways of Travel, or A Summer in Europe (Boston, 1859).

=== Selected publications ===
- Hither and Yon (Privately Printed, 1901)
- Highways of Travel; or A Summer in Europe (Boston: Walker, Wise and Company, 1859)
- Drift Weed (1856)
- A Fortnight in St. Petersburg (1899)
- Ethel's Love Life. New York: Rudd and Carleton. 1859.

=== Controversy over Ethel’s Love Life ===
Sweat is widely known for writing the first sapphic novel in America titled Ethel’s Love Life. It was published in 1859 and more than one hundred copies were sold on the first day. She wrote the novel as a testing ground for social theory. Ethel's Love Life reunites radical American experimentalism with passional freedom. The remark was made that almost double that number would have been sold if they had had them. With its lesbian themes, the novel raised much tension and turmoil.

On the inside of the title page Sweat wrote:

"If there is aught of truth within these pages, it will assert itself without assistance and without explanation. If there is any power of expression in these words, it will speak to the hearts which recognize it; and if there is any charm of sentiment beneath the imperfect utterance, it lays itself at the feet of those who give it welcome."

Sweat and Elizabeth Stoddard passed 55 letters between one another during the early 1850s. Theorists and literary critics believe that the two had romantic feelings for one another. Contemporary literary critics believed that Sweat was experienced in her knowledge of lesbianism and that she must have personally experienced these feelings or observed them closely. A second theory is that only Stoddard was homosexual and seeking Sweat's help. As an author, Sweat wanted Ethel, the main character of the novel, to talk in a sensual and passionate language. This romantic rhetoric has two women personas, Lenora and Claudia, who have strange and irrevocable ties. Sweat portrays feelings between women that were considered to be more pure and pious than those of men. Sweat claimed that intimate relationships between women were a form of training for heterosexual relationships. Husbands would leave their marital beds allowing the women to stay together longer. Sweat believes that gender roles need to be redefined to include all gender identities not just heterosexuals. For example, female sexuality is not directly linked to babies and reproduction. Sweat believed that social tolerance was diminished, and that societies view of homosexuality was deviant and chaotic. The idea of change from 'normality' was viewed as corrupt and wrong. Sweat claimed that urbanization, industrialization, and immigration are three key components as to why society has these views. The novel raises the reader's consciousness of the erotic components of same sex relationship. Indications of lesbianism within the novel would have been overlooked at the time it was written; today one would consider the novel a work of lesbian erotica. However, during the Victorian period there had been no indication that there was any social or literary controversy.

=== Diaries ===
Sweat recorded seemingly everything in her life in a diary, journal or poem. Sweat never missed a day. All of her entries were written in cursive. She is well known for her journal entries and reports of all her and husband’s travels. Sweat wrote daily "for mental discipline!" She communicated with herself via her diary and journal. On days that nothing exciting happened she would write the word ‘same’ and that was it. This word same appeared on a series of pages, some times up to five days in a row. Sweat recorded the weather, her friends' daily activities, and notes on world current events. Many of her entries recorded attendance at operas, plays, and other theatrical entertainments that she loved attending. She kept some of the tickets as keepsakes. Sweat did not write a lot about herself; instead her diary entries focused on other people. Sweat kept personal information in her diaries as well, including dates to remember such as birthdays, club meetings, and historical dates. She also wrote down the gossip she heard among her friends and in public; she enjoyed knowing so much information. She kept news articles about her husband and obituaries of people she knew. Sweat would edit the articles written about her husband, as if they were in error or not up to her literary standard. Sweat attended a lot of luncheons, it was one of her favorite things to do during the day. Sweat's sense of humor is evident in her journals.

Sweat's first journal entry was on Tuesday, October 30, 1849; the day of her wedding. She described the marriage ceremony, and how she altered the wedding vows, which was considered very daring during this time period. When she and her husband travel together, she noted the number of miles traveled and the number of letters she received on every trip. For example, she traveled 24,000 miles in 1858. Sweat recorded her own and her husband’s health issues. She often stated her symptoms but failed to make a diagnosis or make sense of what her body was actually going through. She did not like to visit her doctor. Sweat believed that she was immune to depression; which almost all women at this time were prone to. Sweat mentions that she frequently did not feel well most days. She got sick on a few of her trips out of the country. She took opium belladonna daily. At one point during Sweat’s life, doctors believed she needed to be placed in an insane asylum. Her husband refused the advice on behalf of Sweat. Sweat thought of her husband very highly. She did not mention him much in her diaries, but when she did there is a lot of affection behind the text. She used pet names and describes how much she loved him. When her husband dies her journal articles became more prevalent; she felt lonely for the ten years she survived him.

== The Washington Club ==
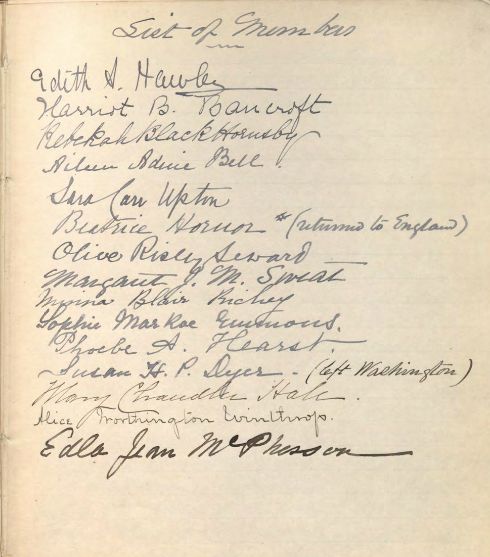
All 12 members signatures of the Cobweb Club

=== Cobweb Club ===
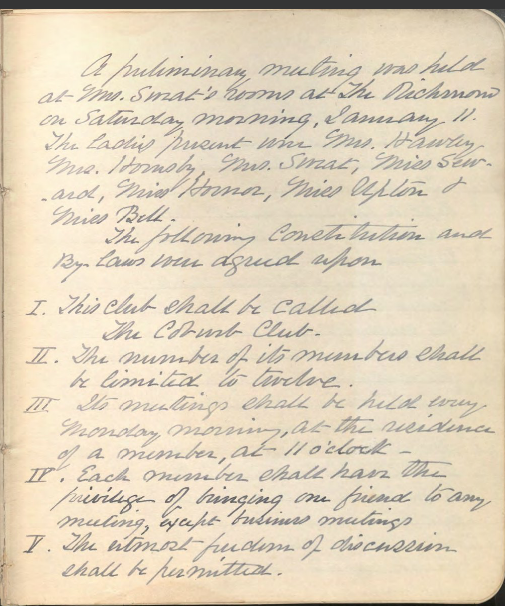
The first 5 commandments of the Cobweb Club

Sweat organized The Cobweb Club in 1890. This club was one of the first effective women's clubs. The women described the club as "a woman’s literary club of much prestige." The club's constitution stated, "the utmost freedom of expression shall be preserved. Conversation and discussion to be encouraged." This club became the nucleus for the Washington Club in later years. With twelve members, the club had twelve commandments all members must follow. The club never expanded nor decreased. It was organized unconventionally and lasted only a few short years. Meetings were held every Monday at 11 at one of the member's home. Controversial topics discussed during these meetings were solely based on culture and recreational issues; oftentimes the members all read or prepared a paper on an issue or subject they felt needed discussing and then presented it to the members of the club. Unlike many women who were confined to their homes to take care of the house and children, Sweat and women like her who were educated, participated in many clubs. Sweat was white middle class, along with the majority of her friends, which granted her opportunities to participate in society. Generating this club, women were intellectually stimulated and driven to think progressively. The Cobweb Club's social mobility and public knowledge is what caused an uproar in the public. Women in these clubs were educated and could stand up for what they believed in; their voices were heard.

=== Washington Club ===
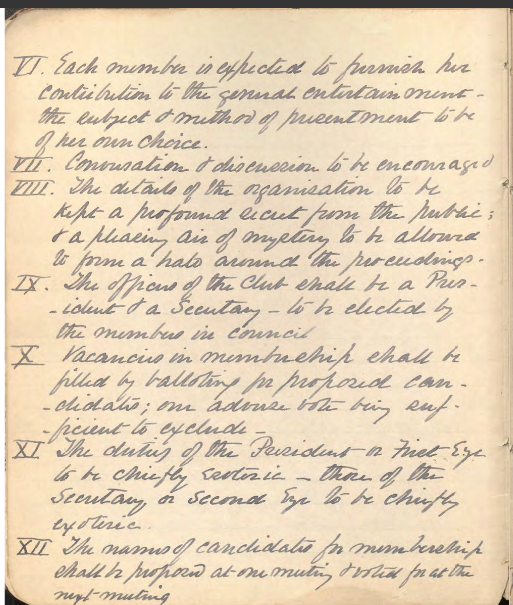
Commandments 6-12 of the Cobweb Club

The Cobweb Club originally was a small private club that later developed into, and is now known as, the Washington Club. Mrs. Lee, widow of Admiral Willis Augustus "Ching" Lee, was the President of the Washington Club. The women expanded their group through literary circles, and within these circles they knew a lot of women. Members would read passages and essays together, or, one person would be assigned to write an essay and share with the group. One of Sweat's favorites was the art talks; she loved theater and art and discussions about them. Fencing classes and other extra curricular activities were offered to the members of the group. Sweat describes the difference between a women's club and a men's club:

"at first there was no thought of making the club a literary center, but here is just the difference between a man's club and a woman's; to the former his club is a place of recreation to the latter it must be a place of self culture in some, direction or other."
