= McLellan-Sweat Mansion =

Historic house in Maine, United States

- U.S. National Register of Historic Places
- U.S. National Historic Landmark
- U.S. Historic district – Contributing property
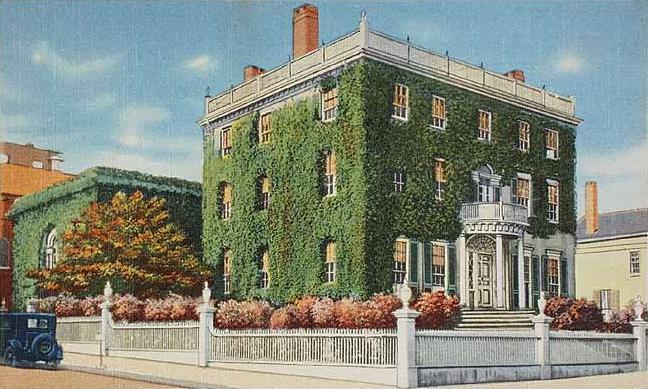

- Location within Maine Location within the United States
- Location: Portland, Maine
- Coordinates: 43°39′12″N 70°15′45″W
- Built: 1800-1801
- Architect: John Kimball Sr.
- Architectural style: Federal
- Part of: Spring Street Historic District (ID70000043)
- NRHP reference No.: 70000073

Significant dates
- Added to NRHP: March 5, 1970
- Designated NHL: December 30, 1970
- Designated CP: April 3, 1970

The McLellan-Sweat Mansion (or The McLellan House) is a historic house museum on High Street in Portland, Maine. It forms the rear component of the Portland Museum of Art complex. Built in 1800–01, the house was designated a National Historic Landmark in 1970 as a well-preserved Federal style brick townhouse.

== Description and history ==
The McLellan-Sweat Mansion is set at the corner of High and Spring Streets in downtown Portland, but is accessed via the main entrance of the Portland Museum of Art at Congress Square. It is a three-story brick structure with a low-pitch hip roof and a granite foundation. The brick of the walls is laid in Flemish bond. The main facade, facing Spring Street, is five bays wide, with a central entrance sheltered by a semicircular portico supported by Doric columns, and topped by a balustrade. The entry is flanked by sidelight windows and topped by a fanlight window. Above the entry on the second level is a Palladian window. The roofline has a bracketed cornice, and there is a low balustrade ringing the roof whose posts are surmounted by urns. The interior has a central-hall plan, with high-quality woodwork in the public rooms of the first floor.

Constructed in 1800–1801 for shipping magnate Major Hugh McLellan, the brick mansion was designed by John Kimball Sr. (1758–1831). The cost was $20,000. After a change of owners, the property was purchased in 1880 by Lorenzo De Medici Sweat. In 1908, his widow bequeathed it to the Portland Society of Art (now the Portland Museum of Art). The L. D. M. Sweat Memorial Galleries, designed by John Calvin Stevens, were added in 1911 behind the house, to which they connected by corridor.

In 1957, two mantelpieces salvaged from the 1805 Commodore Edward Preble House, designed by Alexander Parris, replaced originals lost during a Greek Revival remodeling of the drawing and dining rooms. In 1970, the house was added to the National Register of Historic Places and was designated a National Historic Landmark. The Charles Shipman Payson Building by Henry N. Cobb of Pei, Cobb, Freed & Partners opened in 1983, extending the length of the museum to its new entrance on Congress Square Plaza. After an extensive restoration, the McLellan House reopened in 2002.

== See also ==
- List of National Historic Landmarks in Maine
- National Register of Historic Places listings in Portland, Maine
