= Ledoux =

Ledoux or LeDoux is a surname, and may refer to:

- Chris LeDoux (1948–2005), American country music singer-songwriter
- Claude Nicolas Ledoux (1736–1806), French architect
- Claude Ledoux (composer) (born 1960), Belgian composer
- Gabrielle LeDoux (born 1948), American lawyer and politician
- Harold LeDoux (1926–2015), American comic artist
- Joseph E. LeDoux (born 1949), American neuroscientist
- Michel Ledoux (born 1958), French mathematician
- Patrice Ledoux, French film producer
- Paul Ledoux (1914–1988), Belgian astronomer
- Scott LeDoux (1949–2011), American boxer
