= Portland Museum of Art =

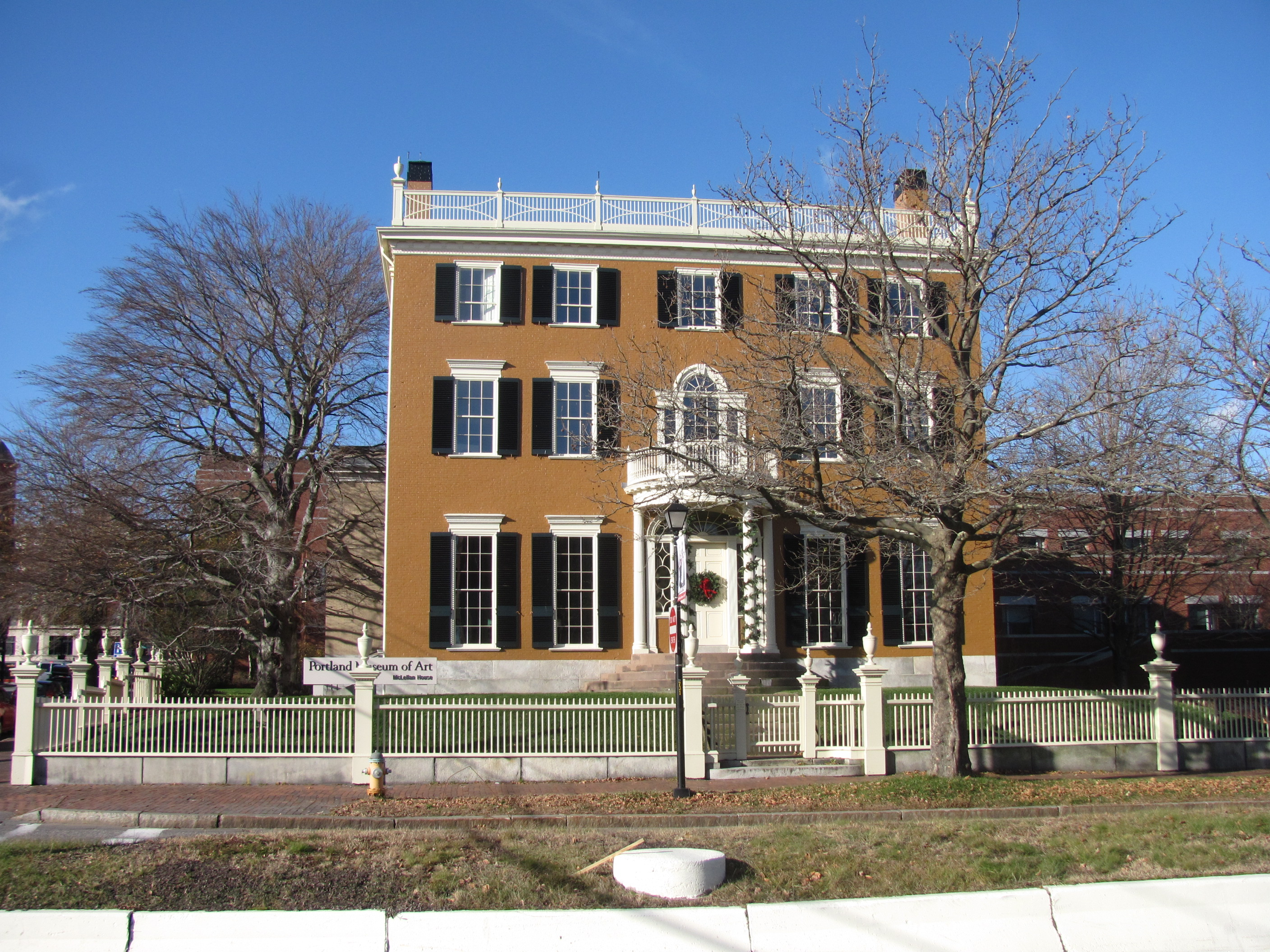
- McLellan House, Portland Museum of Art
- Location: Portland, Maine
- Coordinates: 43°39′13″N 70°15′44″W
- Type: Art Museum
- Website: portlandmuseum.org

The Portland Museum of Art, or PMA, is the largest and oldest public art institution in Maine. Founded as the Portland Society of Art in 1882. It is located in the downtown area known as The Arts District in Portland, Maine.

== History ==
The PMA used a variety of exhibition spaces until 1908; that year Margaret Jane Mussey Sweat bequeathed her three-story mansion, now known as the McLellan House, and sufficient funds to create a gallery in memory of her late husband, Lorenzo De Medici Sweat, who was a U.S. Representative. Noted New England architect John Calvin Stevens designed the L. D. M. Sweat Memorial Galleries, which opened to the public in 1911.

Over the next 65 years, as the size and scope of the exhibitions expanded, the limitations of the museum's galleries, storage, and support areas became apparent. From 1960 to 1962, Donelson Hoopes served as its director. In 1976, Maine native Charles Shipman Payson promised the museum his collection of 17 paintings by Winslow Homer. Recognizing the museum's physical limitations, he also gave $8 million toward the building of an addition to be designed by Henry Nichols Cobb of I. M. Pei & Partners. Construction began on the Charles Shipman Payson Building in 1981, and within two years the $8.2 million facility was opened to the public.

Payson's gift of the Homer paintings served as a catalyst for the museum's expansion as well as for significant long-term loans and outright gifts to the museum. In direct response to the Payson gift, the 1979 gift of the Hamilton Easter Field Art Foundation Collection added more than 50 paintings, sculptures, and works on paper by American modernists to the collection. In 1991, the Joan Whitney Payson Collection (owned by Charles Payson's wife Joan Whitney, a Whitney family heiress and New York City socialite) of 20 impressionist and post-impressionist works of art was given to the museum on permanent loan. In 1996, Elizabeth B. Noyce, art collector and Maine philanthropist, bequeathed 66 works of American art, which is the most extensive and diverse gift of American art ever presented to the museum.

The PMA attracts approximately 140,000 visitors a year, and has around 8,500 members.

== Collection ==
The museum's collection includes more than 22,000 artworks, dating from the 18th century to the present. The PMA's collection features works by artists including Winslow Homer, Marsden Hartley, John Marin, Louise Nevelson, Andrew Wyeth and John Greenleaf Cloudman. The museum has the largest European collection in Maine. The major European movements from impressionism through surrealism are represented by the Joan Whitney Payson, Albert Otten, and Scott M. Black collections, which include works by Giambattista Pittoni, Mary Cassatt, Edgar Degas, René Magritte, Claude Monet, Edvard Munch, Pablo Picasso, and Auguste Rodin. The Elizabeth B. Noyce Collection, a bequest of 66 paintings and sculptures, includes paintings by George Bellows, Alfred Thompson Bricher, Abraham Walkowitz, and Jamie Wyeth, and masterpieces by Childe Hassam, Fitz Henry Lane, and N. C. Wyeth.

== Facilities ==
The museum's three architecturally significant buildings unite three centuries that showcase the history of American art and culture.

In 1980, the museum purchased the neighboring Libby & Sons Department store, which was built in 1897 as the Young Men’s Christian Association Building, and the small Women’s Christian Temperance Union Building. Both buildings were torn down that year and replaced with the Charles Shipman Payson Building.

Since its opening in 1983, the Charles Shipman Payson Building has been the public face of the museum. Although the original vision of both the architect and the museum's strategic plan was to integrate all three buildings, the Charles Shipman Payson Building the L. D. M. Sweat Memorial Galleries, and the McLellan House only recently has the museum been positioned to achieve this goal. In January 2000, the museum launched a $13.5 million capital campaign to raise funds for the preservation and educational interpretation of its two historic structures.

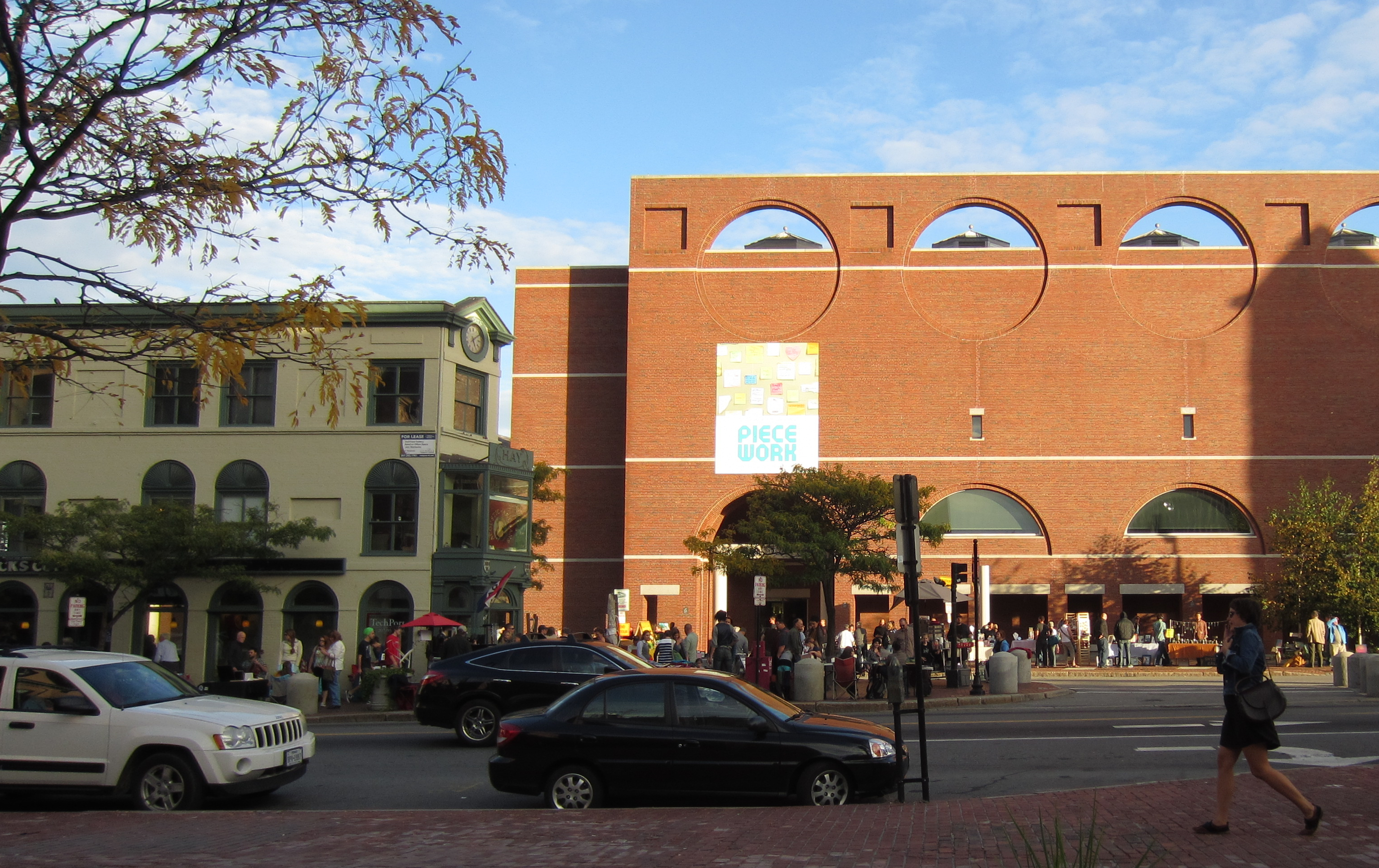
The Portland Museum of Art in the Arts District of Portland.

The project to integrate the three buildings began in the fall of 2000 and was completed in October 2002. The McLellan House and L. D. M. Sweat Memorial Galleries have an emphasis on 19th-century American art, and the Payson Building houses European and American works from the 20th and 21st centuries. The project to "complete the Museum" returned the McLellan House to its original neoclassical elegance and the L. D. M. Sweat Memorial Galleries to their Beaux-Arts splendor, in the process creating distinctive spaces for the museum's outstanding collection of 19th-century American art. The museum's expanded space allows a more complete presentation of the permanent collection, which in recent years has grown in quality and historical importance. In 2014, Scott Simons Architects was engaged to develop a campus masterplan to help position the museum for growth. The museum is open from 10:00 a.m. to 6:00 p.m. every day except Monday and Tuesday.

In 2007, the museum purchased the neighboring YWCA building, constructed in 1961 and used to house women. It later removed the building and built a staff parking lot.

In 2026, the museum purchased another nearby Free Street building and two adjacent parking lots for $14 million from MaineHealth, with plans to move its administrative offices there to expand gallery space in its main facility.

=== 142 Free Street controversy ===
The building at 142 Free Street was built in 1830 as a theatre, then served as a Baptist church for 85 years before being purchased by the Portland Chamber of Commerce in 1926 and being renovated by John Calvin Stevens. It later became the Children's Museum of Maine. In 2009, the Congress Street Historic District was created and the building at 142 Free Street was classified as a “contributing structure.” The Portland Museum of Art bought the building in 2019.

In 2022, the museum presented plans for a 5,600 m^{2} (60,000 sq ft) expansion that would demolish the historic former Children's Museum of Maine building at 142 Free Street. Four finalist international architectural firms that included Adjaye Associates, Toshiko Mori and MVRDV created designs and in 2022 LEVER created the winning design.

In 2023, the Portland Museum of Art requested that the building be reclassified as noncontributing to the historic district. In a letter to the Historic Preservation Board, museum director Mark Bessire said the 142 Free Street lacks "historical stature" because it was renovated in 1926 during the racist Jim Crow era. "Our region is one that is striving to become more inclusive, dynamic, and diverse – a city where everyone belongs – and some architecture styles can carry unfortunate legacies of the past into the future that undermine these values and goals,” Bessire wrote.

History professor KC Johnson called the argument a "cynical effort to exploit contemporary cultural mores to serve the Museum of Art's short-term economic interests." Museum board chair Elizabeth McCandless wrote that demolishing 142 Free Street "is essential for our neighborhood, our city and for all who reside in and visit this area" and acknowledged the proposal's "divisiveness within the community." A former curator of the National Building Museum, David Chase, wrote that "Destroying 142 Free Street and trashing the Payson Building smacks of contempt for history, contempt for context, contempt for local ordinances." Former museum director Daniel O'Leary called the move "unwise and unwarranted."

The owner of the Time & Temperature Building in the same historic district said ahead of the Portland City Council vote that reclassifying the historic status of 142 Free Street could jeopardize the historic tax credits needed to build 250 affordable apartments in the historic high-rise office building on Congress Street.

The Portland Planning Board and the Historic Preservation board voted against reclassification. In May 2024, the Portland City Council ignored the advice of the planning and historic preservation boards and voted 6-3 to remove the building's historic classification. In June 2024, Greater Portland Landmarks sued in Cumberland County Superior Court seeking to reverse the Portland City Council's decision to reclassify the building. In March 2025, Superior Court Justice Deborah Cashman ruled that reclassification stands and the demolition could move forward. In September 2025, the museum tore down 142 Free Street.

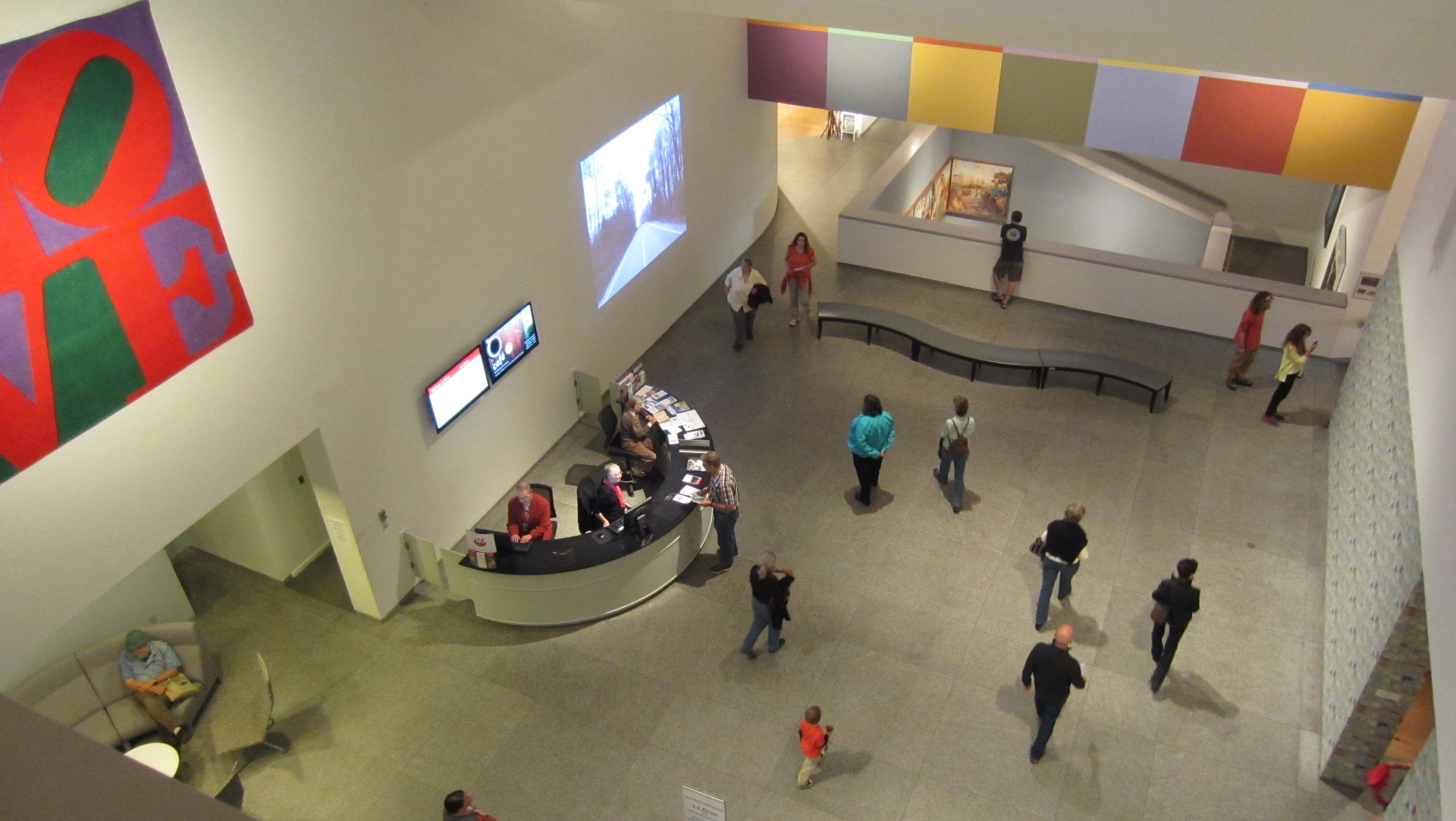
Main lobby of Museum
