= Dorchester Park =

- U.S. National Register of Historic Places
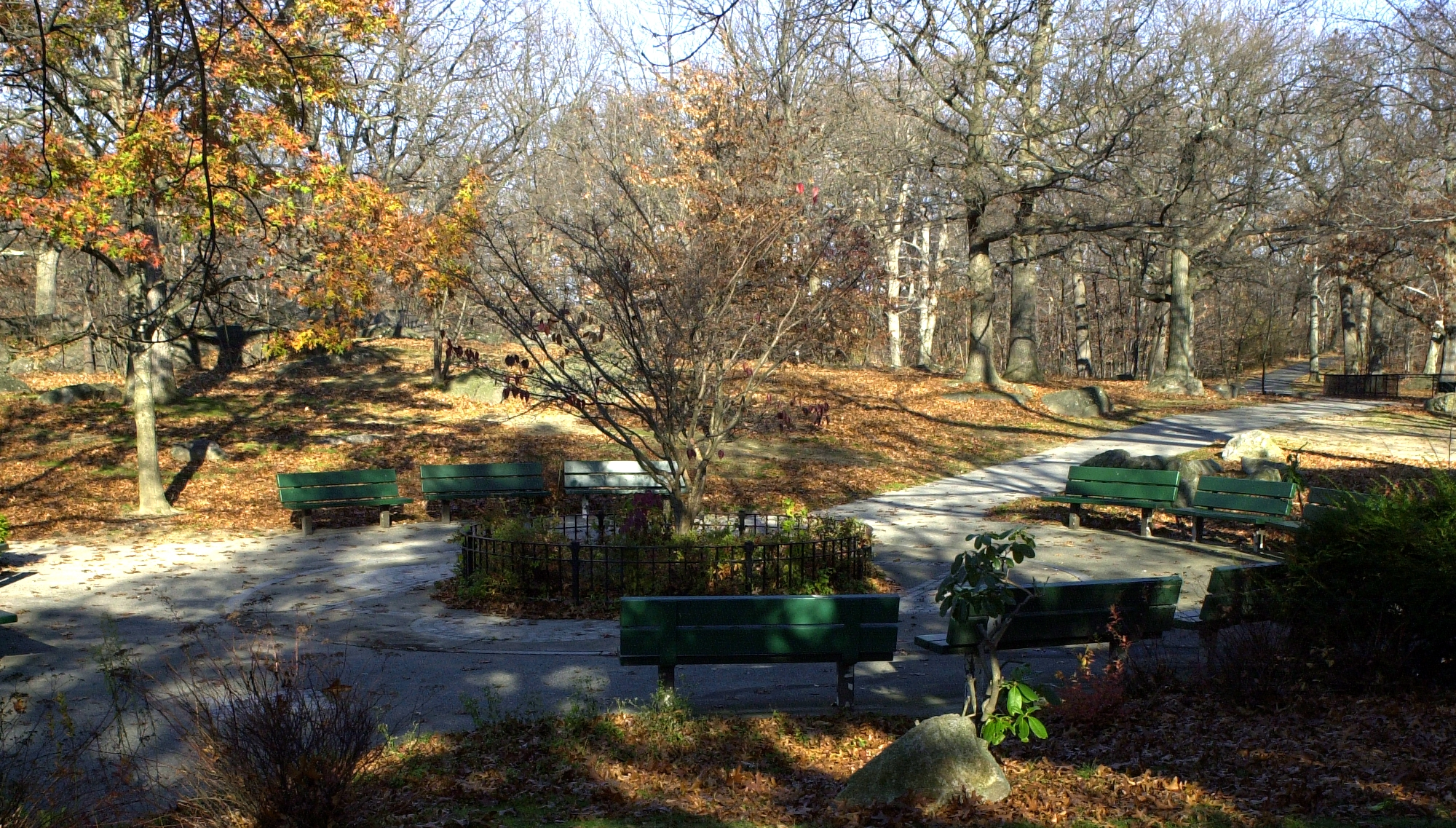

- Location within Massachusetts Location within the United States
- Location: Bounded by Dorchester Ave., Richmond, Adams & Richview Sts., Boston, Massachusetts
- Coordinates: 42°16′32.4″N 71°3′54.2″W
- Area: 28.5 acres (11.5 ha)
- Built: 1734
- Architect: Olmsted, Olmsted & Eliot
- NRHP reference No.: 08000089
- Added to NRHP: February 20, 2008

Dorchester Park is a historic park bounded by Dorchester Avenue, Richmond, Adams and Richview Streets in the Dorchester neighborhood of Boston, Massachusetts.

The park was designed by Olmsted, Olmsted & Eliot, and constructed in 1891, as part of Boston's Emerald Necklace of parks first conceived by the elder Frederick Law Olmsted. It has many naturalistic features, including large areas of woodland. Its main access points are along Dorchester Avenue and Adams Street. The park includes a playground, tennis courts, and a Little League baseball diamond. The wall that lines the park along Adams Street has a historic mile marker, dated 1734, embedded in it.

The park was listed on the National Register of Historic Places in 2008.

== See also ==
- National Register of Historic Places listings in southern Boston, Massachusetts
