= Harrison Square Historic District =

- U.S. National Register of Historic Places
- U.S. Historic district
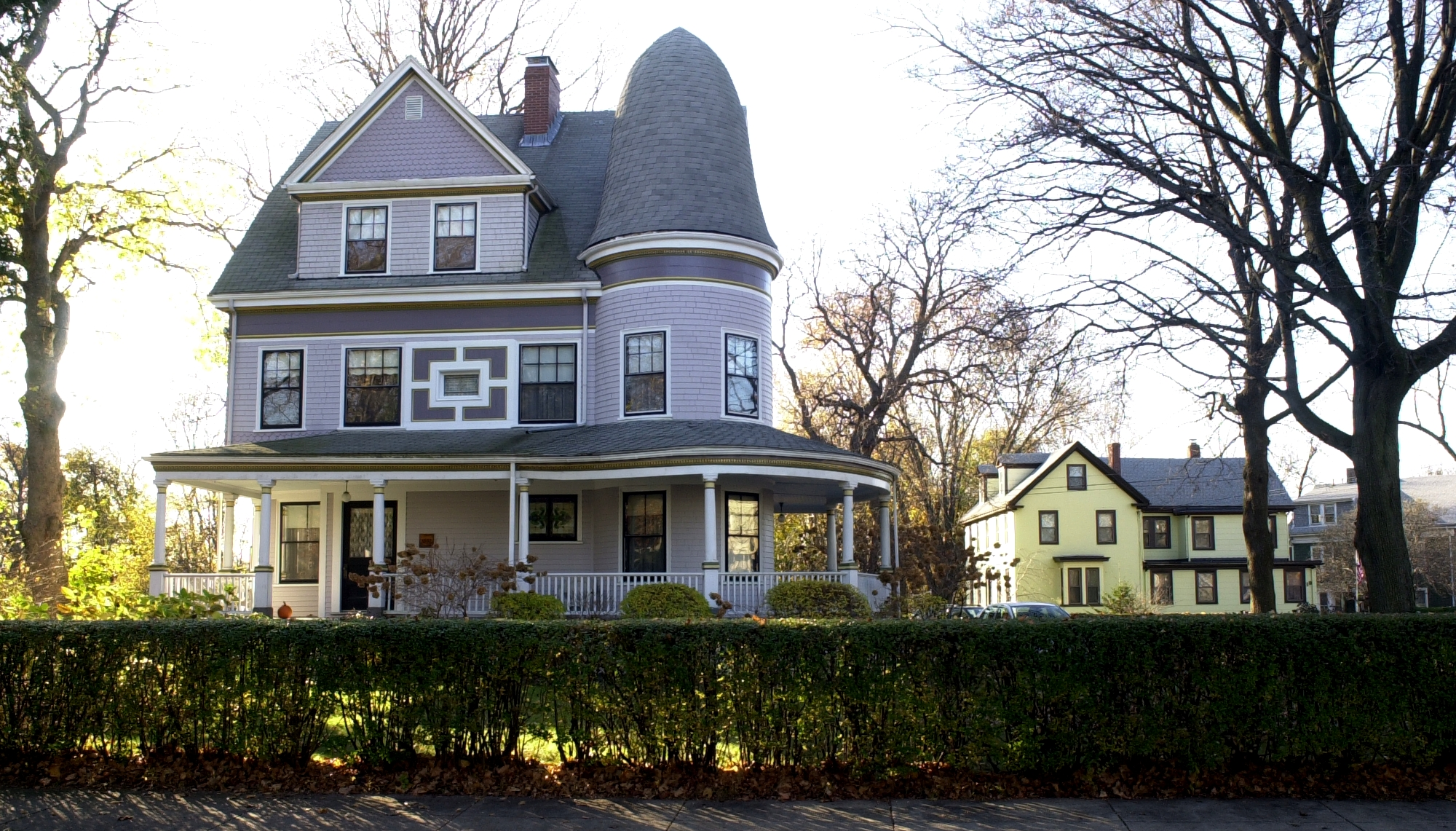
- Location: Bounded by MBTA Braintree line embankment, Park, Everett, Freeport, Mill, Asland, Blanche Sts., Victory Rd., Boston, Massachusetts
- Area: 28 acres (11 ha)
- Built: 1832
- Architect: Briggs, Luther Jr.; Fox, John A.
- Architectural style: Federal, Greek Revival
- NRHP reference No.: 02001190
- Added to NRHP: October 22, 2002

Clam Point (also known as Harrison Square) is a sub-neighborhood in Boston, Massachusetts, US, noteworthy for its collection of substantial Italianate Mansard residences. The area is known to have the most cohesive, intact collection of mansion-scale mid 19th-century housing in Boston, and includes the Park, Everett, Freeport, Mill, Ashland, Blanche Streets, and Victory Road in the Dorchester neighborhood of Boston. In the past decade, the historic area has attracted a new wave of development due to its location on a prime strip of waterfront overlooking Dorchester Bay and its proximity to the Red Line.

Among the architects represented in the district are Luther Briggs, Jr., who also designed the Mount Wollaston Cemetery and John A. Fox, who also designed Tewksbury Hospital, both also on the National Register of Historic Places. In addition to the Federal and Greek Revival architecture noted on the National Register listing, most of the Victorian styles are also represented. The houses on Mill Street are a catalog of architectural styles of the 19th century. The district was added to the Register in 2002.

== History ==
Clam Point used to be called Harrison Square, or "The Square." The name was a tribute to President William Henry Harrison and his visit to Dorchester in 1840. Harrison Square had been used to refer to both the Harrison Square commercial area around the Old Colony Railroad depot (1844), and the residential district later named Clam Point.

The Harrison name fell into disuse since the railroad line closed in the 1950s. The Harrison Square Depot was demolished around 1970. The name Clam Point was likely put into use by real estate developers in the 1970s for marketing purposes.

Clam Point did not have commercial significance for Dorchester until the early 19th century, when ship building and trading took place in proximity to the Commercial Point.

Commerce suffered and declined by the time of The War of 1812 in the area. Although there had been whale and cod fisheries after that, it wasn't until the arrival of the Old Colony Railroad during the mid-1840s that residential development was seriously undertaken. Many affluent families had moved into the area by 1850.

In the 1840s and 1850s, there was a development of large Italianate residences on Park Street. Luther Briggs, John A. Fox, and Mary E. Noyes were among the famous architects who had designed some historically significant mansions for the area. By the 1890s, the area gained prominence as a summer resort, with the Russel House hotel as its centerpiece. By the late 1890s, the Dorchester Yacht Club had been established on Freeport Street.

By the early 20th century, the area began to be populated by recent immigrants to the country, such as the Irish, Italian, and Polish. In the 1930s, due to national economic distress of the Great Depression, many of the large houses were converted to multiple rental units. The construction of Morrissey Boulevard (the Old Colony Parkway) and the Southeast Expressway in the 1950s divided the area into two halves. In the early 2000s, Clam Point began to attract a new wave of development with the construction of luxury condominium complexes on Park and Ashland Streets.

== Houses on Mill Street ==
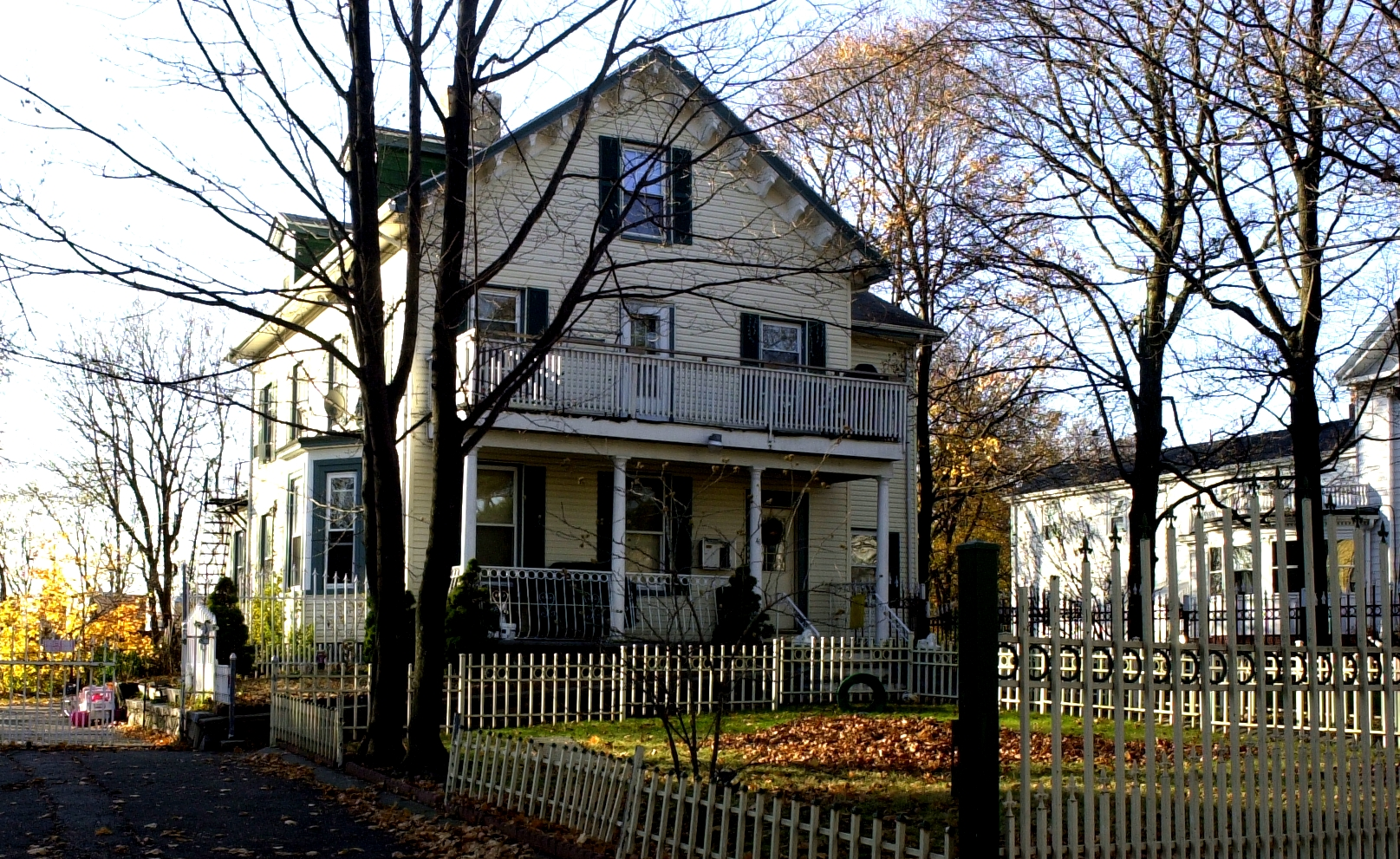

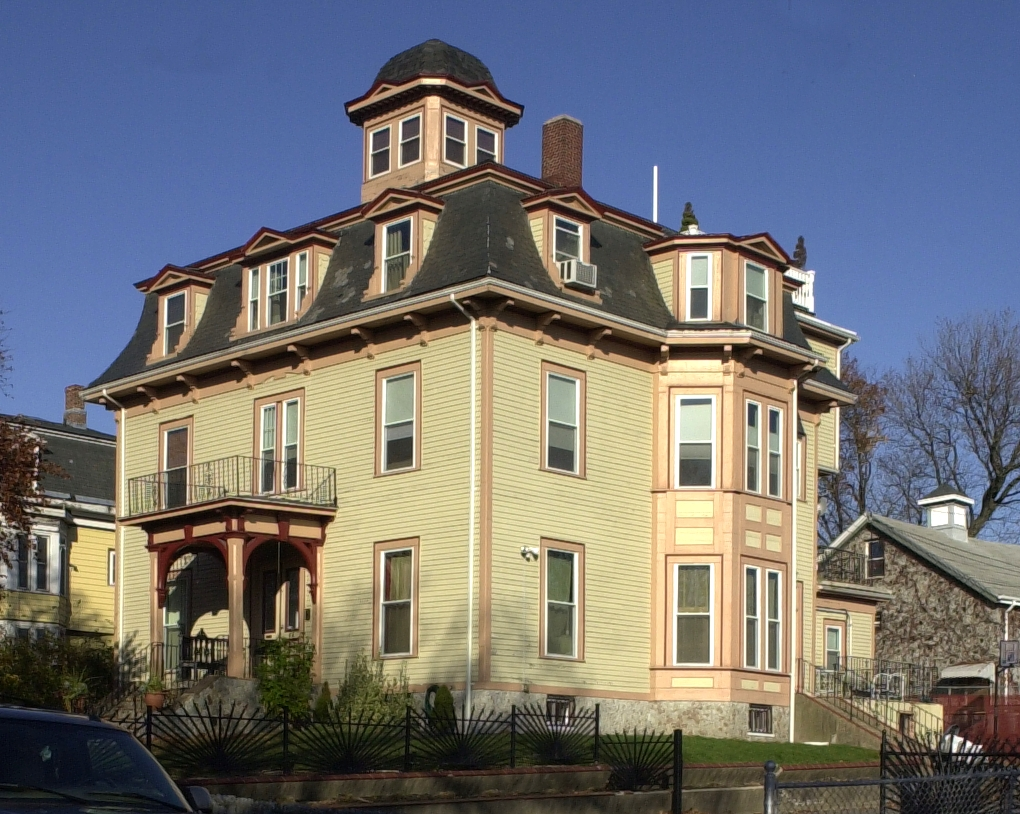

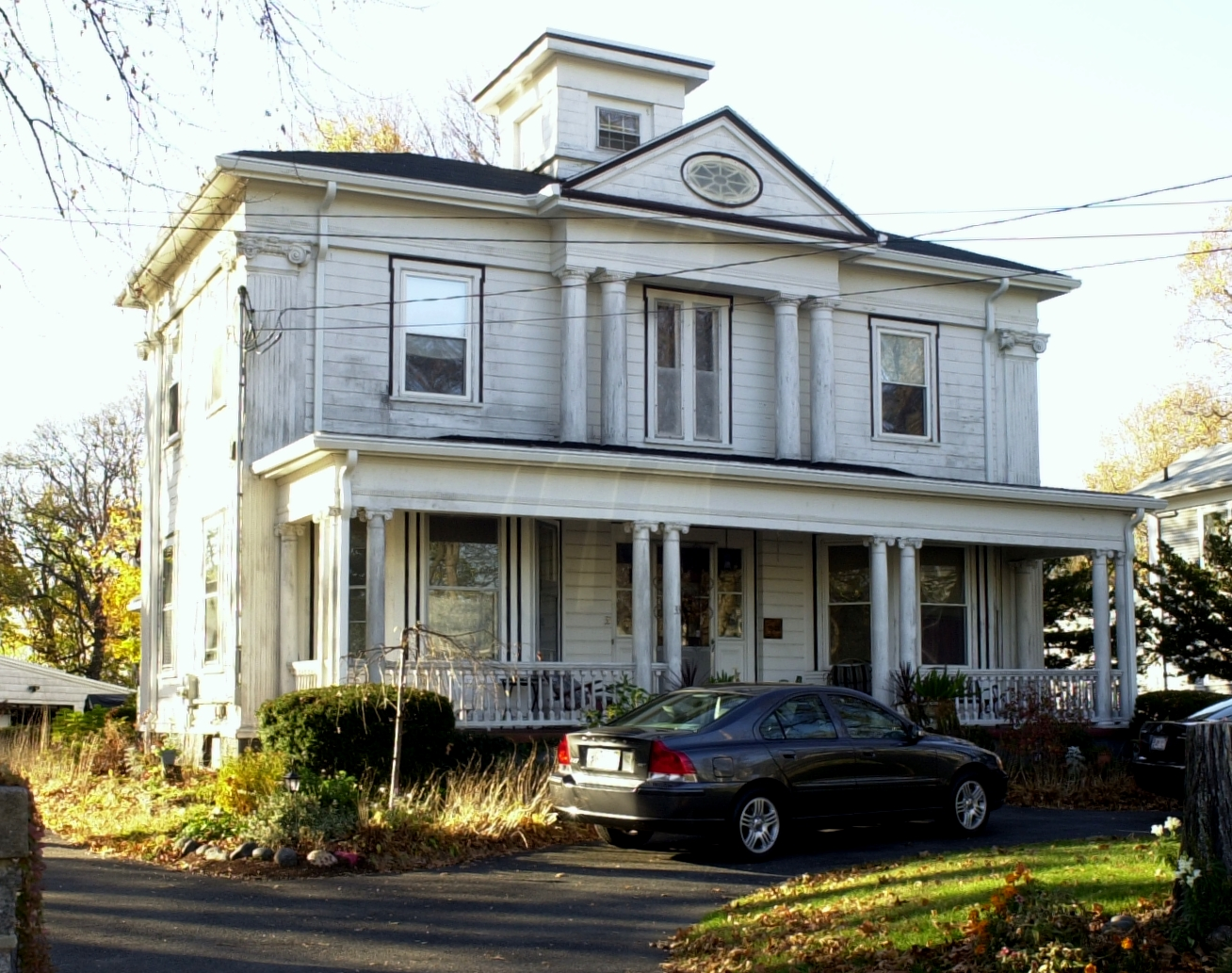

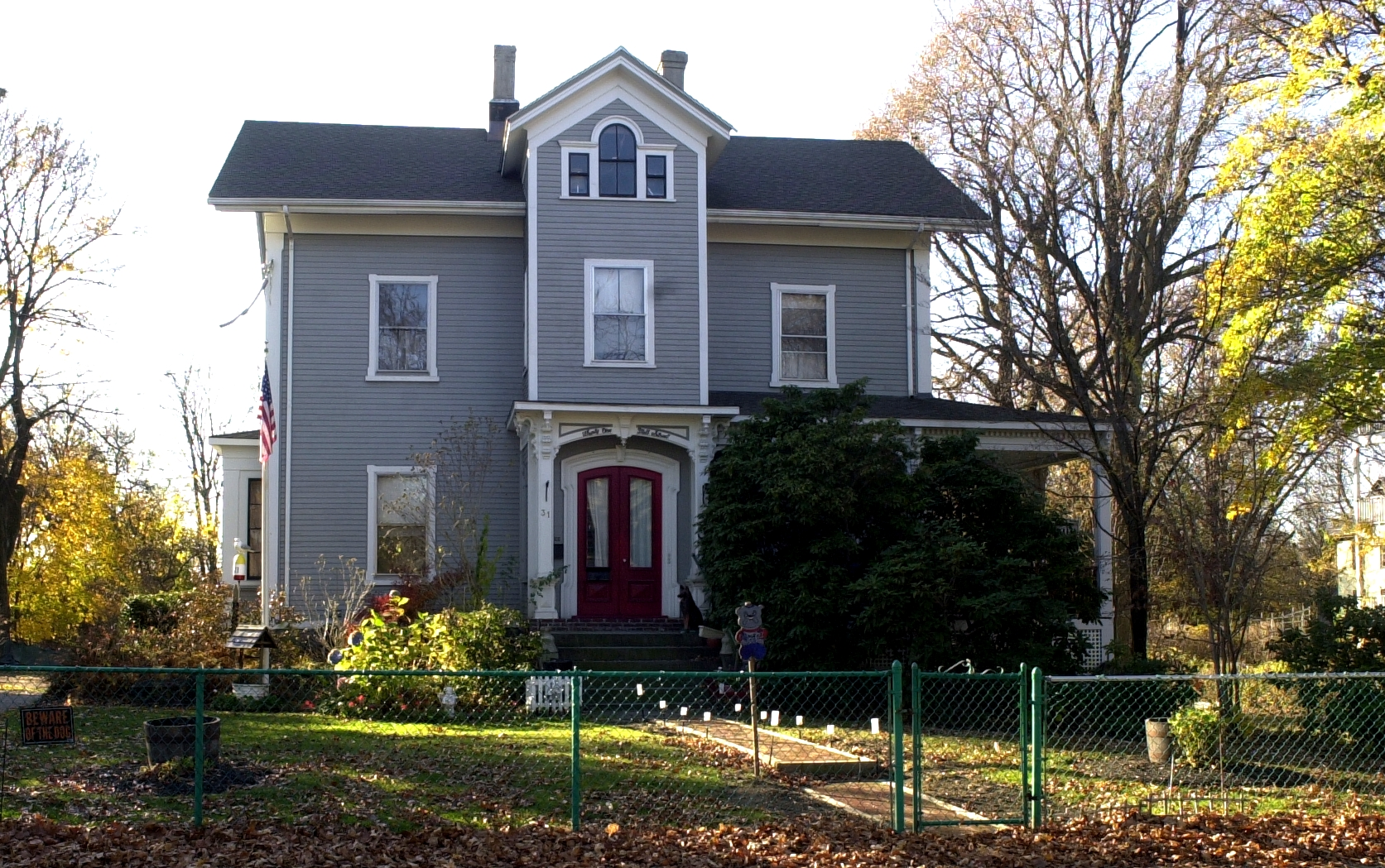

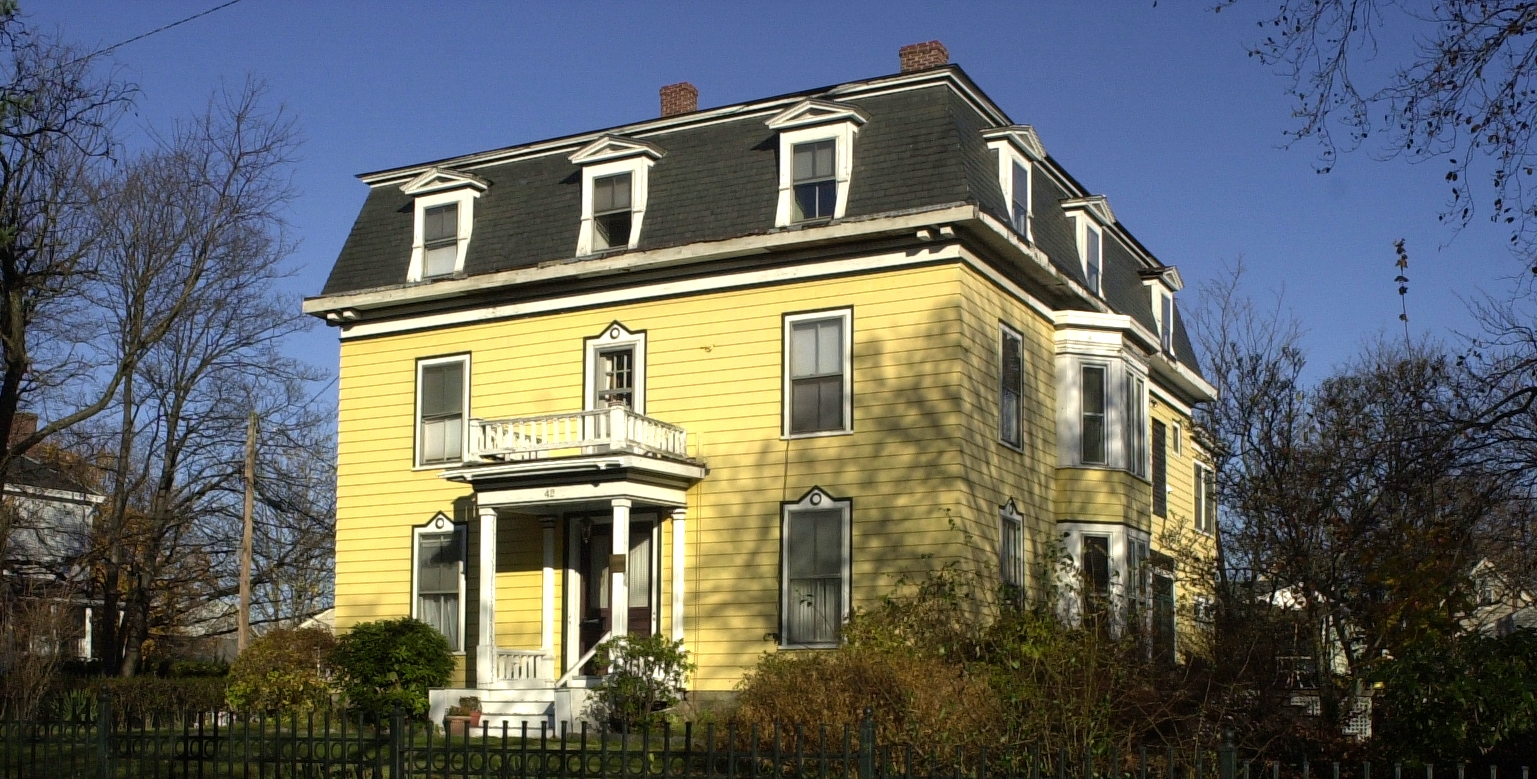

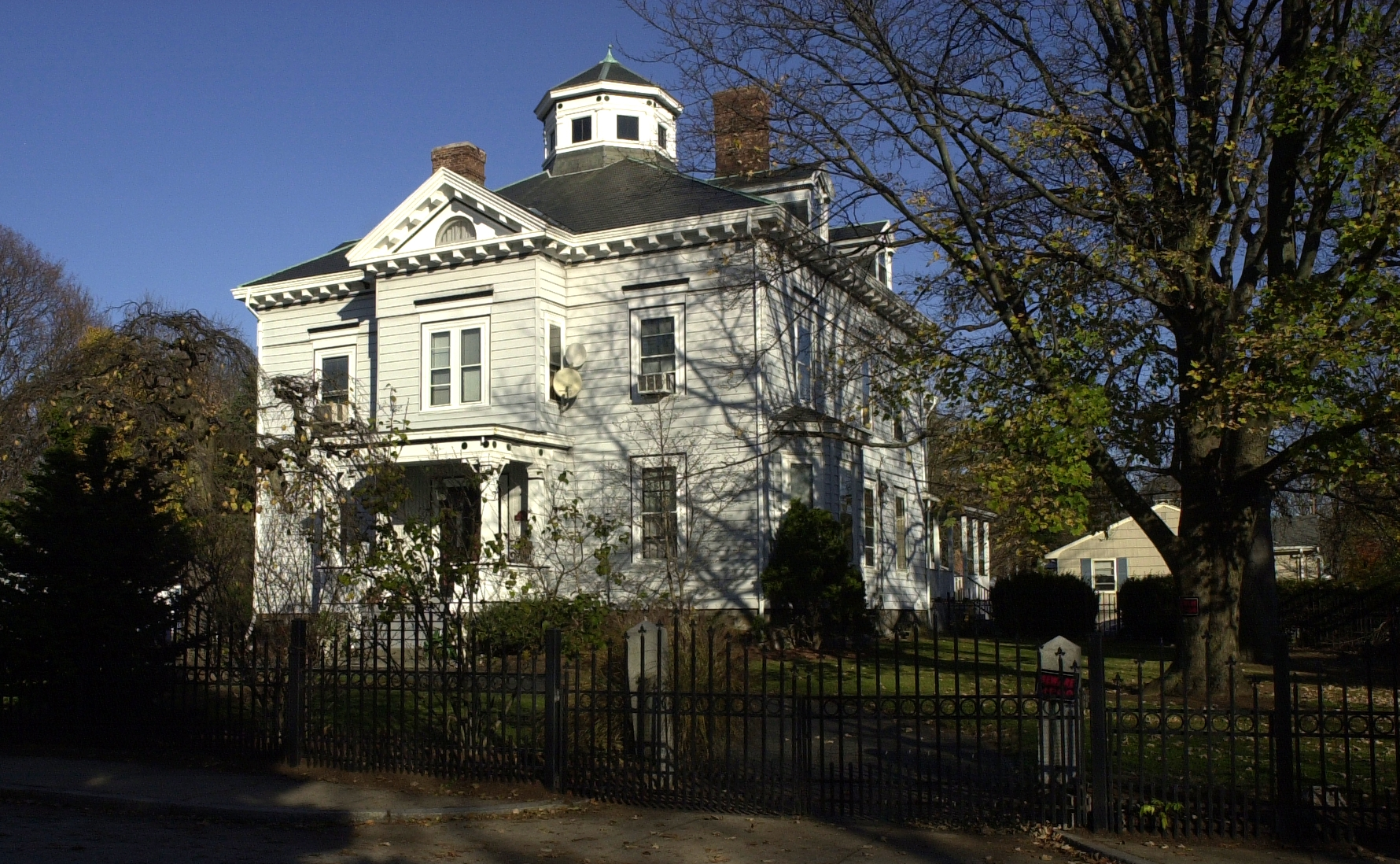

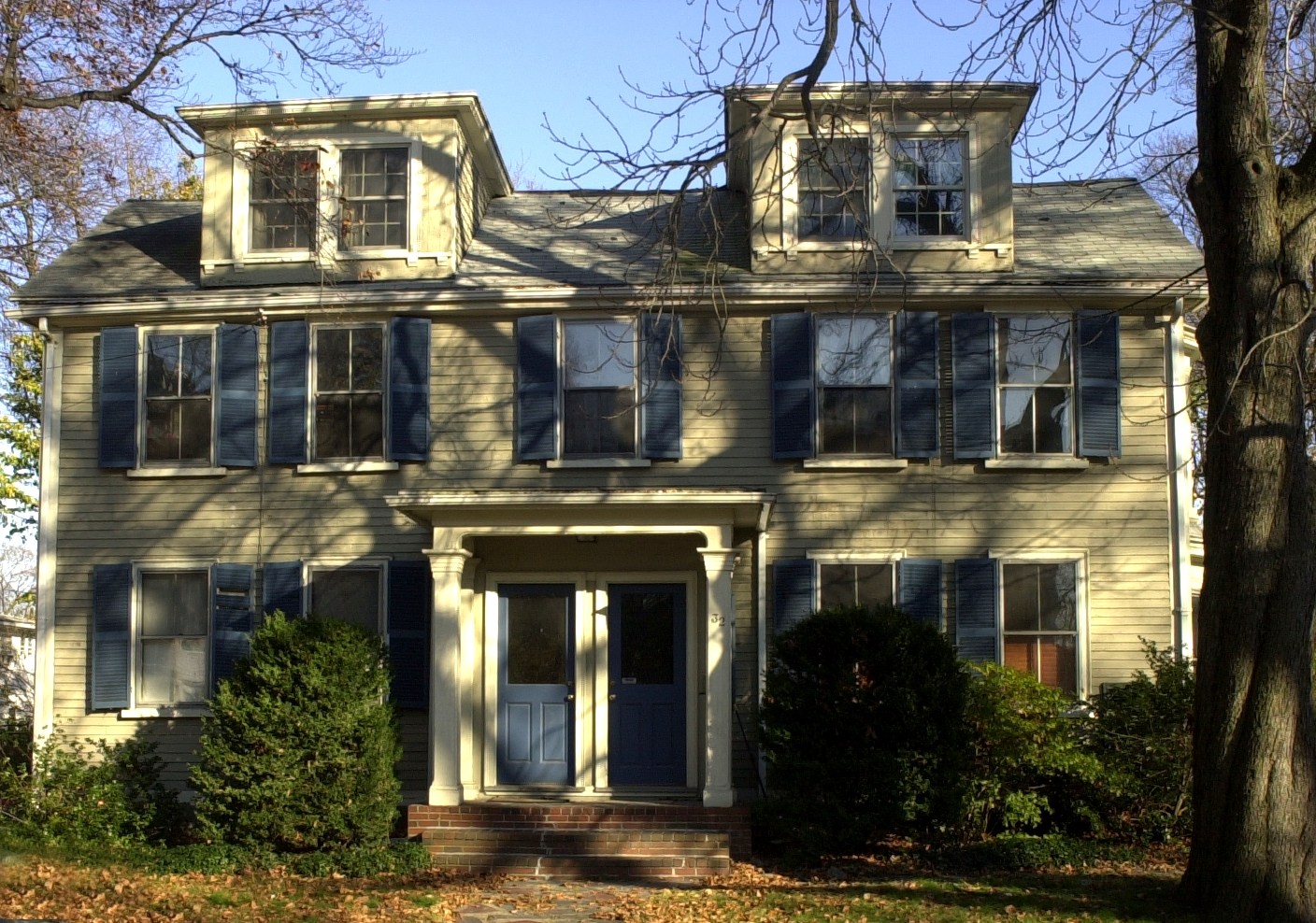

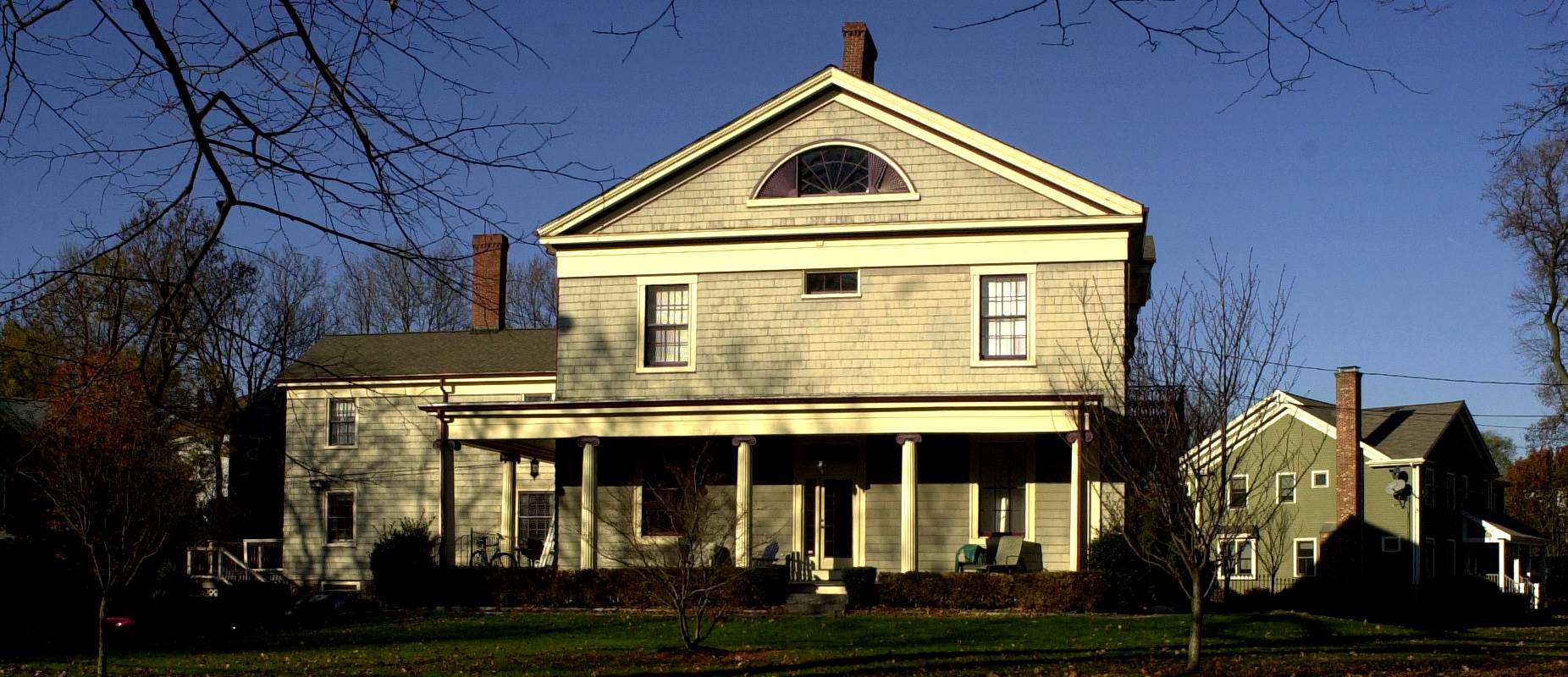

== See also ==
- National Register of Historic Places listings in southern Boston, Massachusetts
