= Dorchester, Boston =

Neighborhood of Boston, Massachusetts

- Neighborhood of Boston
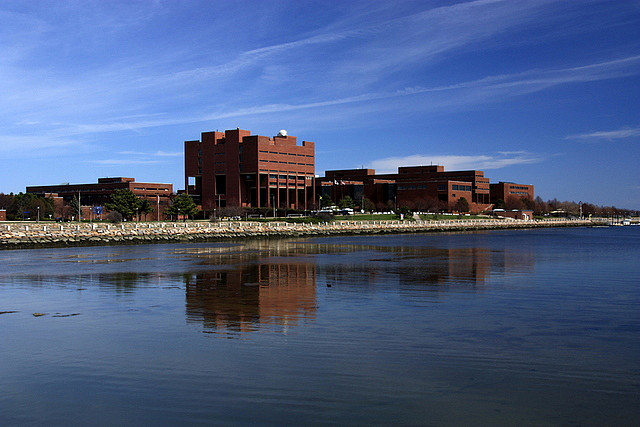
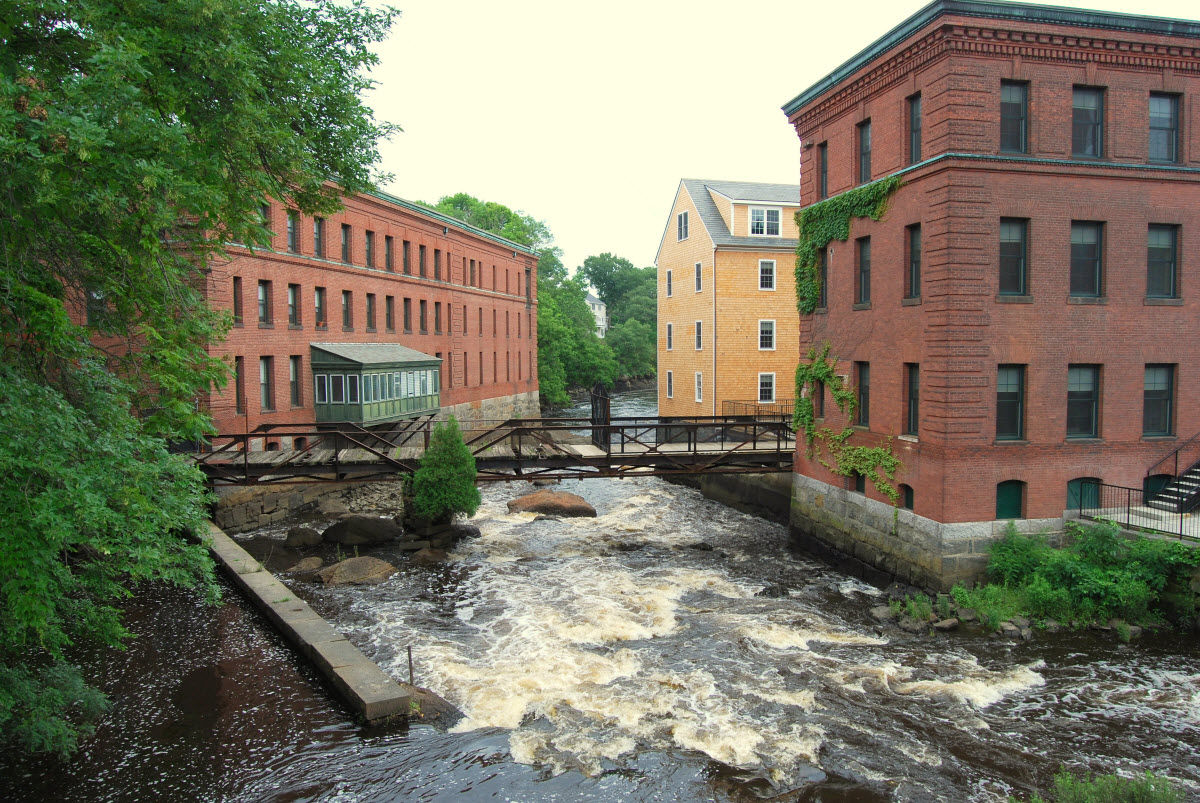
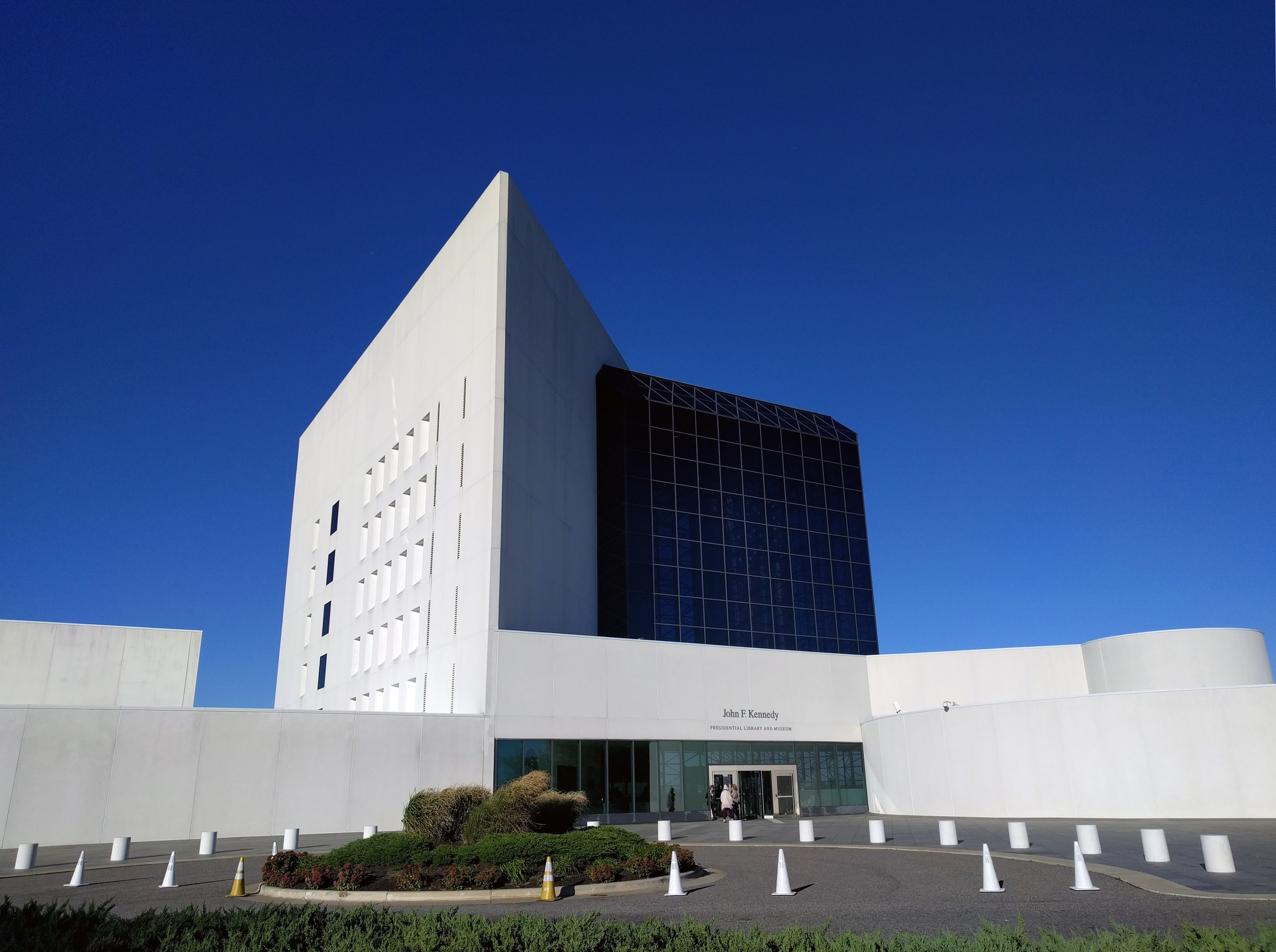
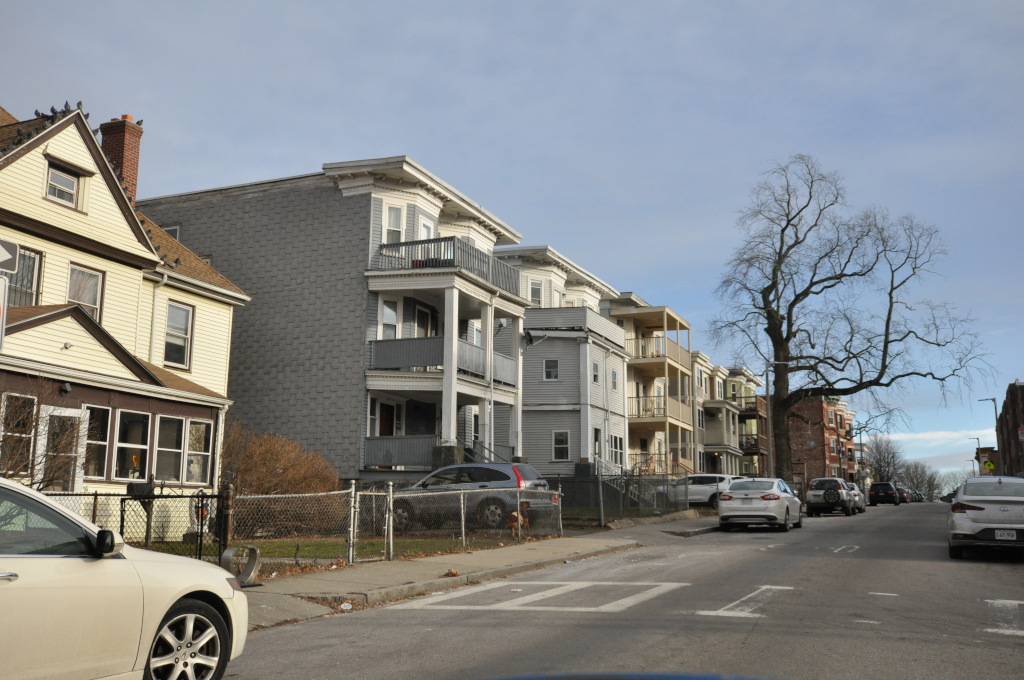
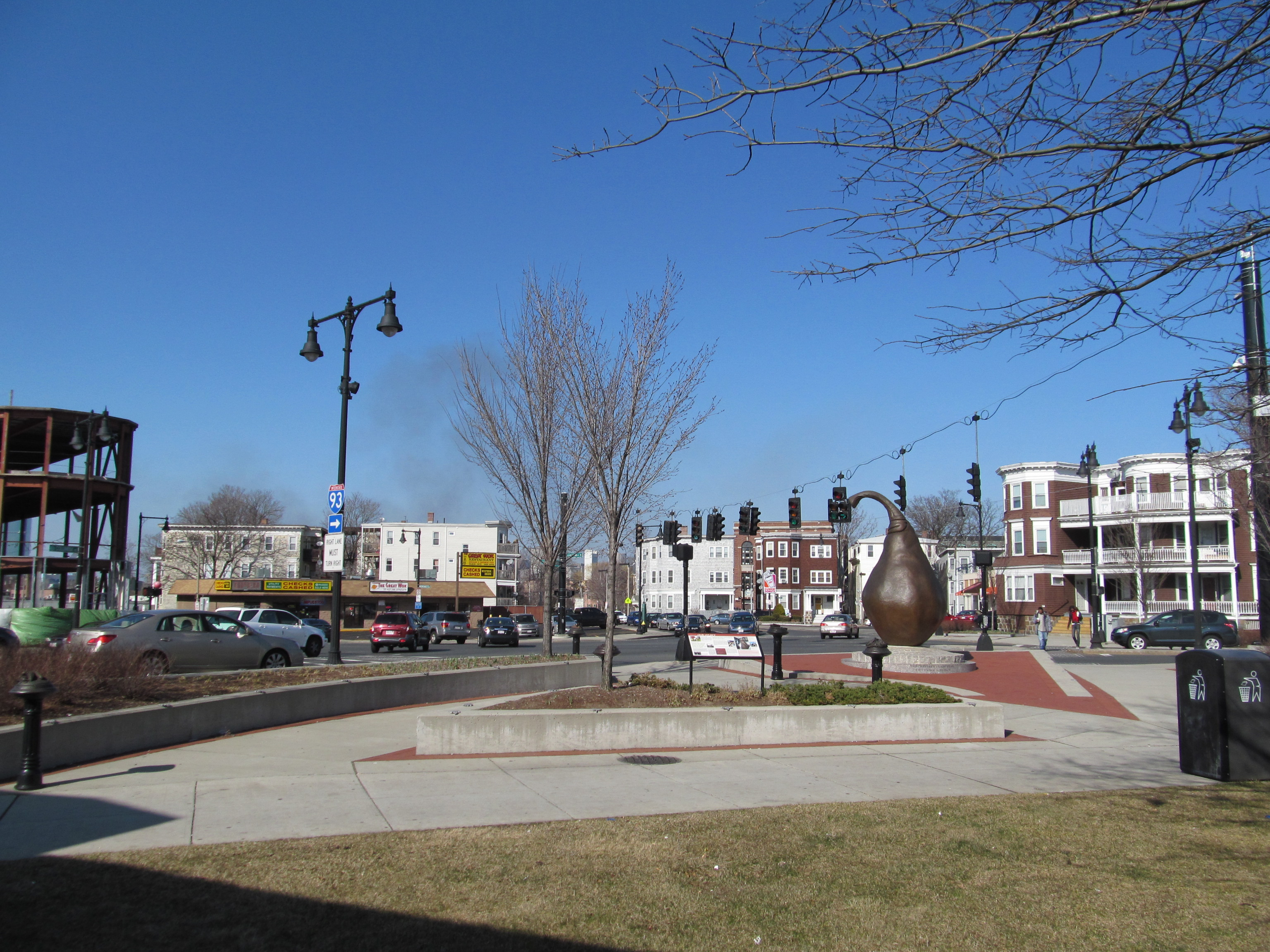
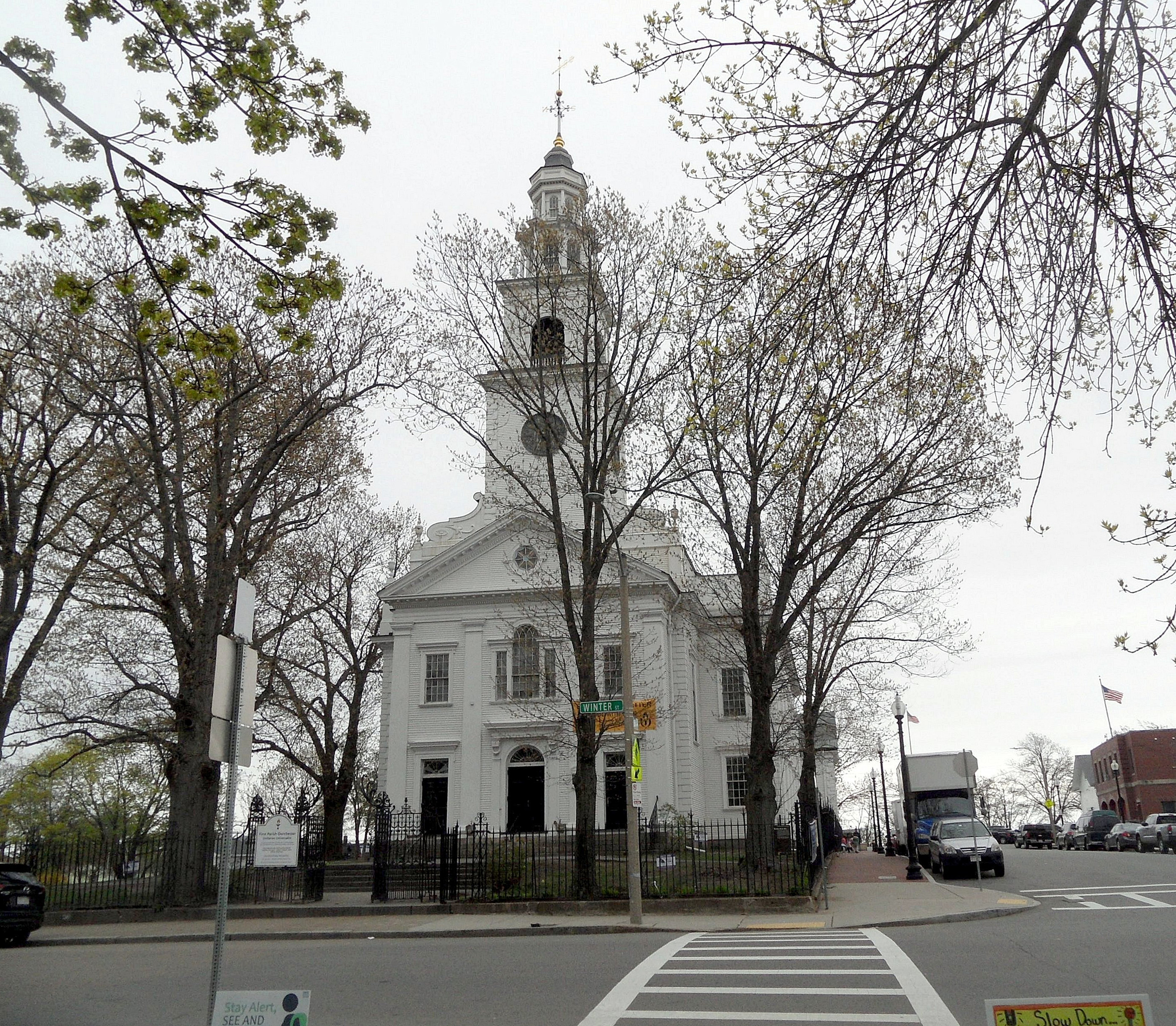
- Left-right from top: University of Massachusetts Boston campus, Neponset River at Lower Mills, JFK Presidential Library, Lawrence Avenue Historic District, Edward Everett Square, First Parish Church of Dorchester

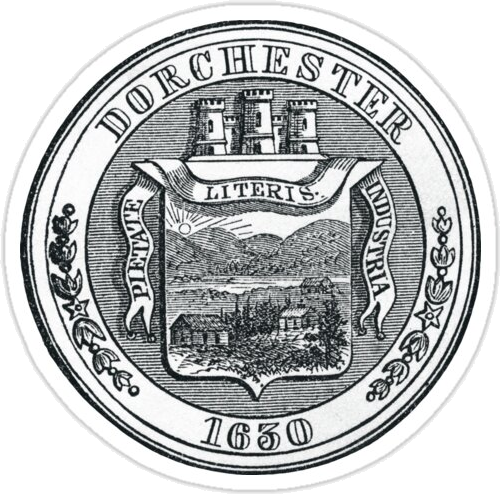
- Seal
- Nickname: Dot
- Motto: Dorchester Pietate, Literis, Industria (Latin) "Piety, Learning, [and] Industry"
- Location within Greater Boston area
- Coordinates: 42°19′N 71°3′W
- Country: United States
- State: Massachusetts
- County: Suffolk
- Neighborhood of: Boston
- Settled: May 31, 1630
- Incorporated: June 1, 1630
- Annexed by Boston: January 4, 1870
- Named for: Dorchester, Dorset

Population (2010)
  - Total: 91,982 to 134,000
- Time zone: UTC-5 (Eastern)
  - Summer (DST): UTC-4 (Eastern)
- ZIP Codes: 02121, 02122, 02124, 02125, 02126 (part of 02126 includes the Dorchester Lower Mills section of Dorchester)
- Area codes: 617 and 857

Dorchester (US: /ˈdɔːrtʃɛstər/ DOR-chest-ər) is a neighborhood comprising more than 6 square miles (16 km^{2}) in the city of Boston, Massachusetts, United States. Originally, Dorchester was a separate town, founded by Puritans who emigrated in 1630 from Dorchester, Dorset, England, to the Massachusetts Bay Colony. This dissolved municipality, Boston's largest neighborhood by far, is often divided by city planners in order to create two planning areas roughly equivalent in size and population to other Boston neighborhoods.

Founded in 1630, just a few months before the founding of the city of Boston, Dorchester now covers a geographic area approximately equivalent to nearby Cambridge. When annexed to Boston in 1870, Dorchester was still a primarily rural town and had a population of 12,000. Construction of railroad and commuter streetcar lines brought rapid growth, increasing the population to 150,000 by 1920. In the 2010 United States census, the neighborhood's population was 92,115.

Dorchester has a very diverse population, which includes a large concentration of African Americans and European Americans (particularly those of Irish, German, Italian, and Polish origin, reflecting late 19th and early 20th century immigration). More numerous immigrants and their descendants since the later 20th century have come from the Caribbean, Central and South America, and East and Southeast Asia.

Dorchester also has a significant LGBT population, with active political groups. It has the third largest concentration of same-sex couples in Boston after the neighborhoods of the South End and Jamaica Plain. Most of the people over the age of 25 have completed high school or obtained a GED.

== History ==
=== Indigenous peoples ===
Prior to European colonization, the region around Dorchester was inhabited by the indigenous Massachusett. They lived in settlements established alongside the Neponset River estuary, which was a plentiful source of fish, including trout; they also gathered shellfish from the riverbed and hunted beaver and deer. They established farms in nearby hills. During the initial period of colonization by Puritan settlers, the Massachusett suffered a rapid decline in population due to the introduction of foreign infectious diseases to which they had no acquired immunity, and violence related to settler colonialism.

The Massachusett sachem, Chickatawbut, negotiated land treaties with the Puritan settlers before dying of smallpox in 1633. His brother, Cutshamekin, who succeeded him, deeded further land to the settlers. The remaining Massachusett in the region, including Cutshamekin, accepted some Christianity as a form of survivance. They eventually resettled in the praying town of Natick.

=== European settlement in the 17th century ===
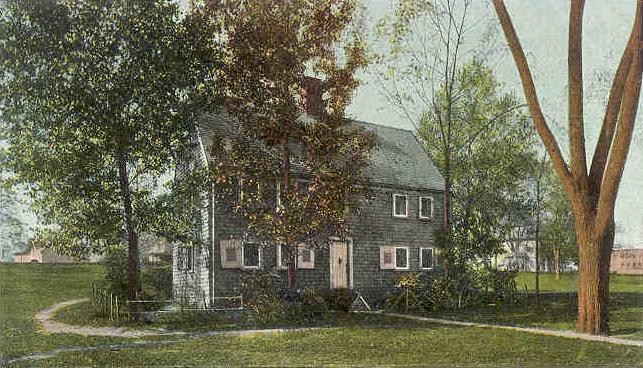
Old Blake House c. 1905

In 1623 a syndicate of Dorsetshire fishermen organized an outport of fishing stages and flakes at Dorchester. In 1626 David Thompson settled his family on Thompson Island in what is now Dorchester before Boston's Puritan migration wave began in 1630.

On May 30, 1630, Captain Squib of the ship Mary and John entered Boston Harbor. On June 17, 1630, he landed a boat with eight men on the Dorchester shore, at what was then a narrow peninsula known as Mattapan or Mattaponnock. Today it is known as Columbia Point (more popularly since 1984 as Harbor Point). Those aboard the ship who founded the town included William Phelps, Roger Ludlowe, John Mason, John Maverick, Nicholas Upsall, Capt. Roger Fyler, William Gaylord, Henry Wolcott, and other men who would become prominent in the founding of a new nation. The original settlement founded in 1630 was at what is now the intersection of Columbia Road and Massachusetts Avenue. (Even though Dorchester was annexed more than 100 years ago into the city of Boston, residents still annually celebrate the founding on Dorchester Day. This includes festivities and a parade down Dorchester Avenue).

Most of the early Dorchester settlers came from the English West Country, and some from Dorchester, Dorset, where Rev. John White was chief proponent of a Puritan settlement in the Americas. The town developed around the First Parish Church of Dorchester. The building is now operated as the Unitarian-Universalist church on Meeting House Hill and is the oldest religious organization in present-day Boston.

On October 8, 1633, the first Town Meeting in what would become the United States was held in Dorchester. Today, October 8 is annually celebrated as Town Meeting Day in Massachusetts. Dorchester is the birthplace of the first public elementary school in America, the Mather School, established in 1639. The school still stands as the oldest elementary school in the United States. In 1634 Israel Stoughton built one of the earliest grist mills in America on the Neponset River; Richard Callicott founded a trading post nearby. In 1641, Dorcas ye blackmore, an enslaved servant to Israel Stoughton, was the first recorded African American to join a church in New England. She served as an evangelist to Stoughton's Native American servants, and the First Parish Church of Dorchester attempted to help Dorcas gain her freedom.

In 1649, Puritan missionaries, including John Eliot, began a campaign to convert the Indigenous people in Dorchester to Christianity with the help of Cockenoe and John Sassamon, two Indian servants in the town. Eliot was given land by the town of Dorchester for his mission, where he established a church and school.

The James Blake House, oldest surviving home in the city of Boston, is located at Edward Everett Square. This is the historic intersection of Columbia Road, Boston Street, and Massachusetts Avenue, a few blocks from the Dorchester Historical Society. The Blake House was constructed in 1661, as was confirmed by dendrochronology in 2007.

In 1695, a party was dispatched to found the town of Dorchester, South Carolina. It lasted a half-century before being abandoned.

=== 18th century ===
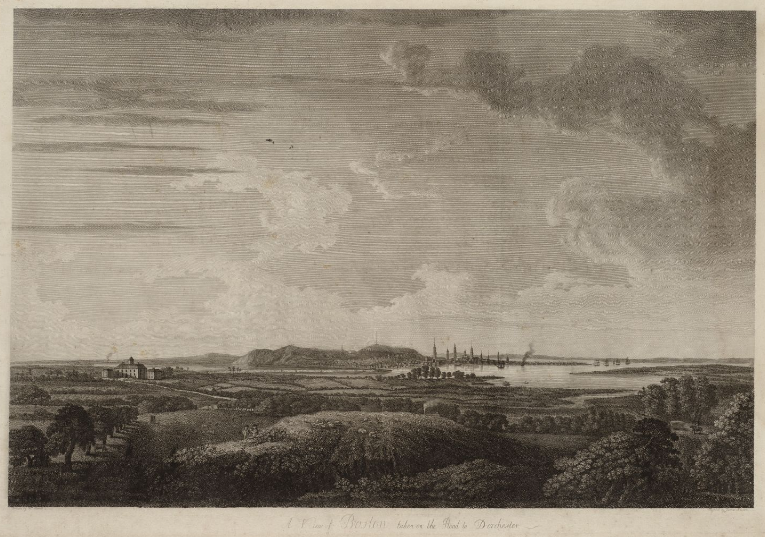
Dorchester looking north toward Boston, c. 1781

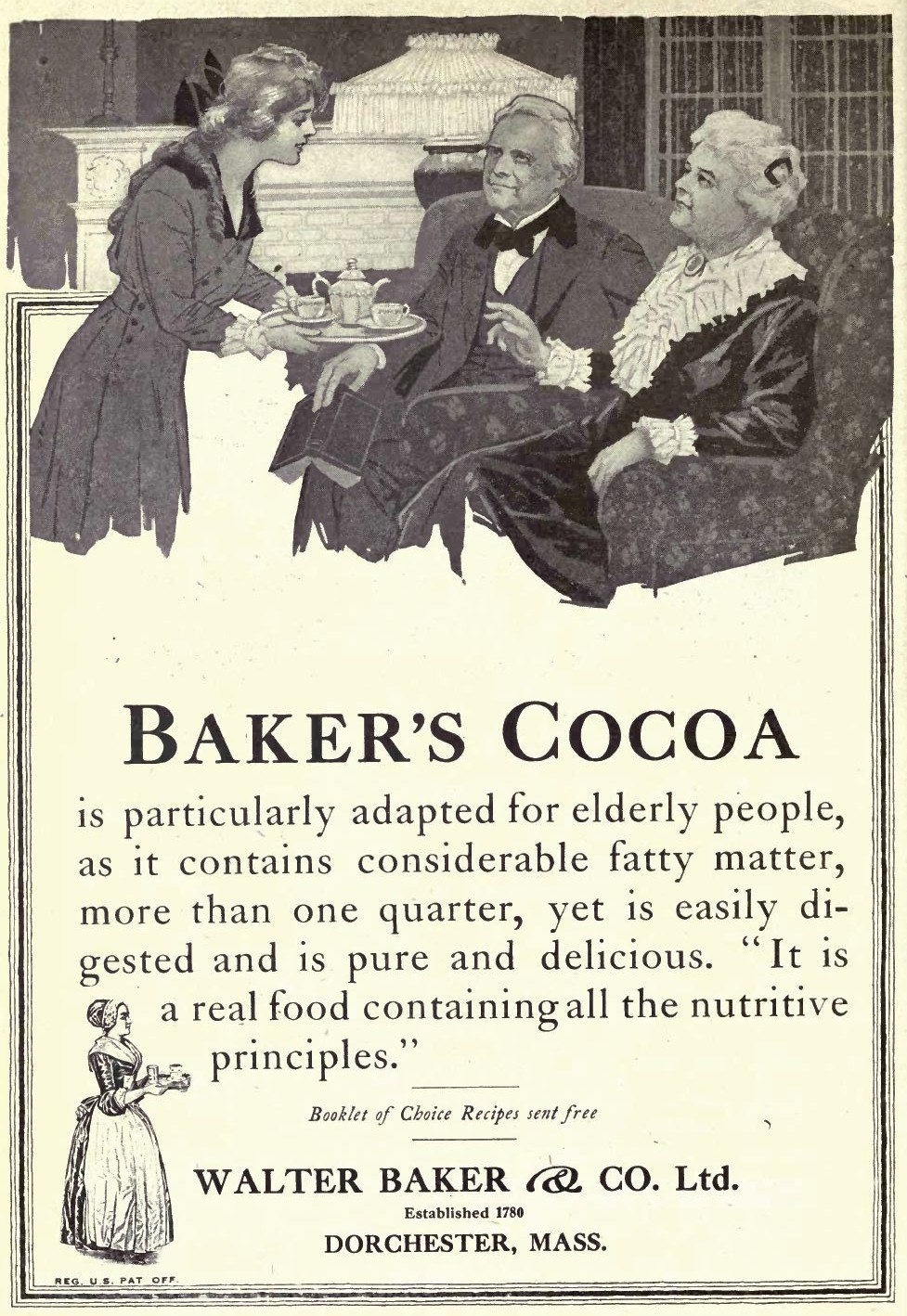
Baker's Cocoa Advertisement in Overland Monthly, January 1919. The manufacture of chocolate had been introduced in the United States in 1765 by John Hannon and Dr. James Baker in Dorchester. Walter Baker & Company was located in Dorchester.

In 1765, Irish chocolate maker John Hannon (or alternatively spelled "Hannan" in some sources) imported beans from the West Indies and refined them in Dorchester. He thus introduced chocolate to the North American colonies, and was working with Dr. James Baker, an American physician and investor. They opened America's first chocolate mill and factory in the Lower Mills section of Dorchester on the Neponset River. The Walter Baker Chocolate Factory, part of Walter Baker & Company, operated until 1965.

Before the American Revolution, "The Sons of Liberty met in August 1769 at the Lemuel Robinson Tavern, which stood on the east side of the upper road (Washington St.) near the present Fuller Street. Lemuel Robinson was a representative of the town during the Revolution and was appointed a colonel in the Revolutionary army." Dorchester (in a part of what is now South Boston) was also the site of the Battle of Dorchester Heights in 1776. As a result, the British evacuated Boston, pulling back to a base in New York's Manhattan and Long Island.

Originally part of Suffolk County, Massachusetts, the town of Dorchester removed from Suffolk County to Norfolk County when it was created on March 26, 1793. Portions of Dorchester annexed in the 19th century by Hyde Park, Milton or Quincy remained within Norfolk County. Portions annexed by Boston (eventually including Hyde Park) became part of Suffolk County again.

=== 19th century ===
==== Victorian era ====
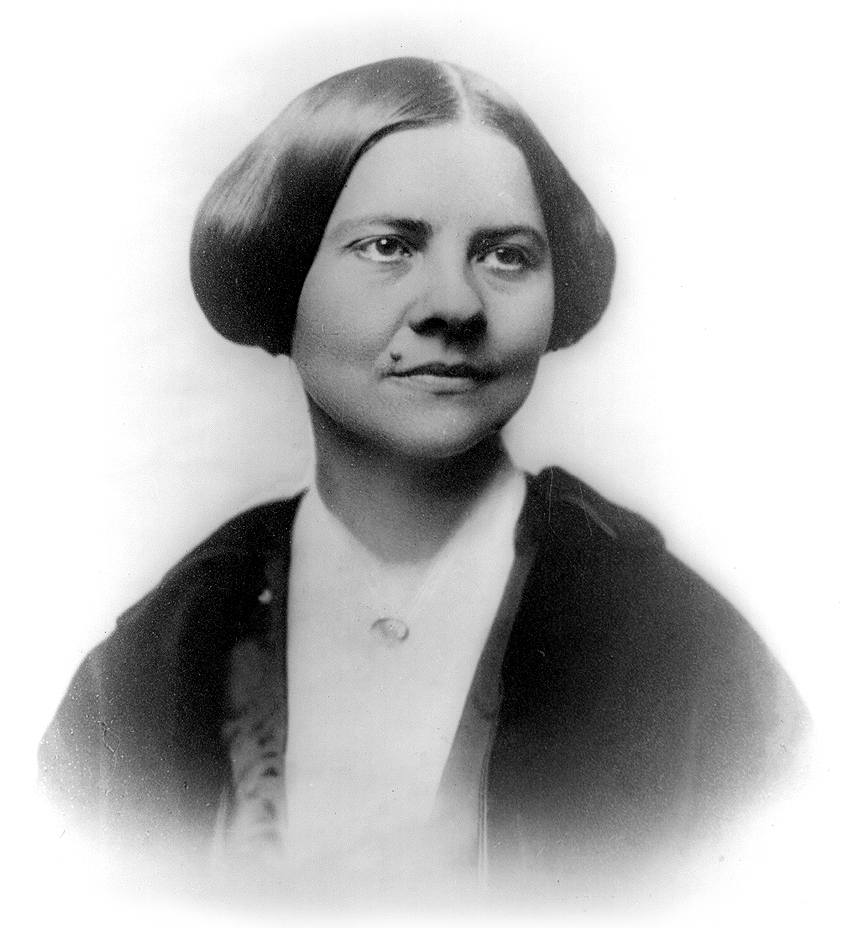
One of Dorchester's most influential residents, Lucy Stone was an early advocate for women's rights.

In Victorian times, Dorchester became a popular country retreat for Boston elite. It developed into a bedroom community, easily accessible to the city by streetcar for commuters. The mother and grandparents of John F. Kennedy lived in the Ashmont Hill neighborhood during the period that his grandfather John F. "Honey Fitz" Fitzgerald was mayor of Boston.

American poet Oliver Wendell Holmes, wrote a poem called "The Dorchester Giant" in 1830. He referred to the special kind of stone, "Roxbury puddingstone", quarried in Dorchester, which was used to build churches in the Boston area. Most notable of these is the Central Congregational Church (later called the Church of the Covenant) in Boston's Back Bay neighborhood.

In 1845, the Old Colony Railroad ran through the area and connected Boston and Plymouth, Massachusetts. Several stations were later added within Dorchester. In the 1840s and 1850s, a new wave of development took place on a strip of waterfront overlooking Dorchester Bay (Park and Mill streets at the Harrison Square Historic District, later known as Clam Point.) Renowned architects who contributed to one of the most significant and intact collections of Clam Point's Italianate mansards include Luther Briggs, John A. Fox, and Mary E. Noyes. By the 1890s, Clam Point gained prominence as a summer resort: the Russell House hotel was its centerpiece and the Dorchester Yacht Club was established on Freeport Street.

In the 1880s, the calf pasture on Columbia Point was developed for a Boston sewer line and pumping station. This large pumping station still stands. In its time it was a model for treating sewage and helping to promote cleaner and healthier urban living conditions. It pumped waste to a remote treatment facility on Moon Island in Boston Harbor, and served as a model for other systems worldwide. This system was operated as the Boston Sewer system's headworks, handling all of the city's sewage, until 1968.

At that time a new treatment facility was built on Deer Island. The pumping station is architecturally significant as a Richardsonian Romanesque designed by Boston City architect, George Clough.The only remaining 19th-century building on Columbia Point, the headworks is listed on the National Register of Historic Places.

==== Annexation to Boston ====
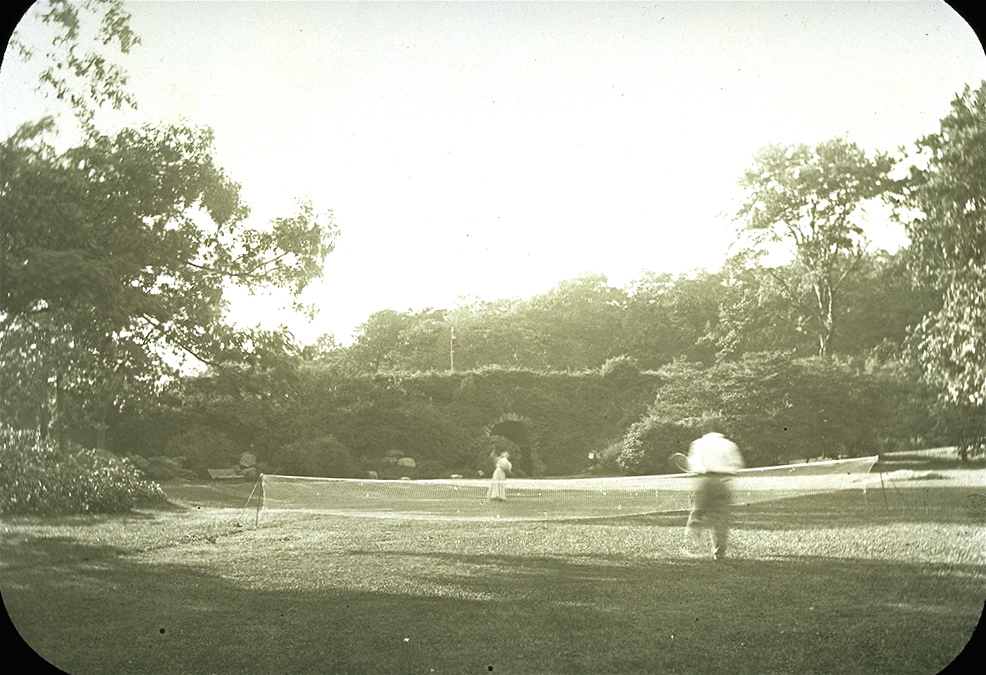
Two people play tennis in Franklin Park, 1906.

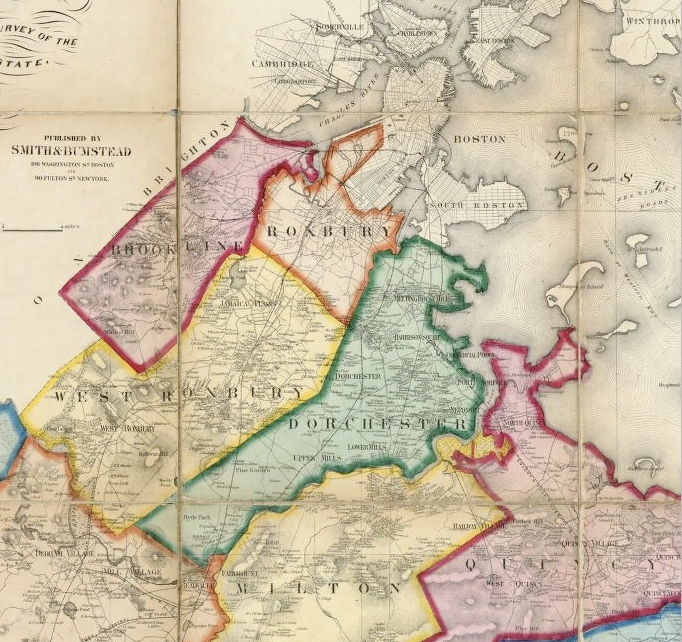
Map of Dorchester, Massachusetts, and surrounding area from the H. F. Walling Map of the County of Norfolk, Massachusetts, 1858

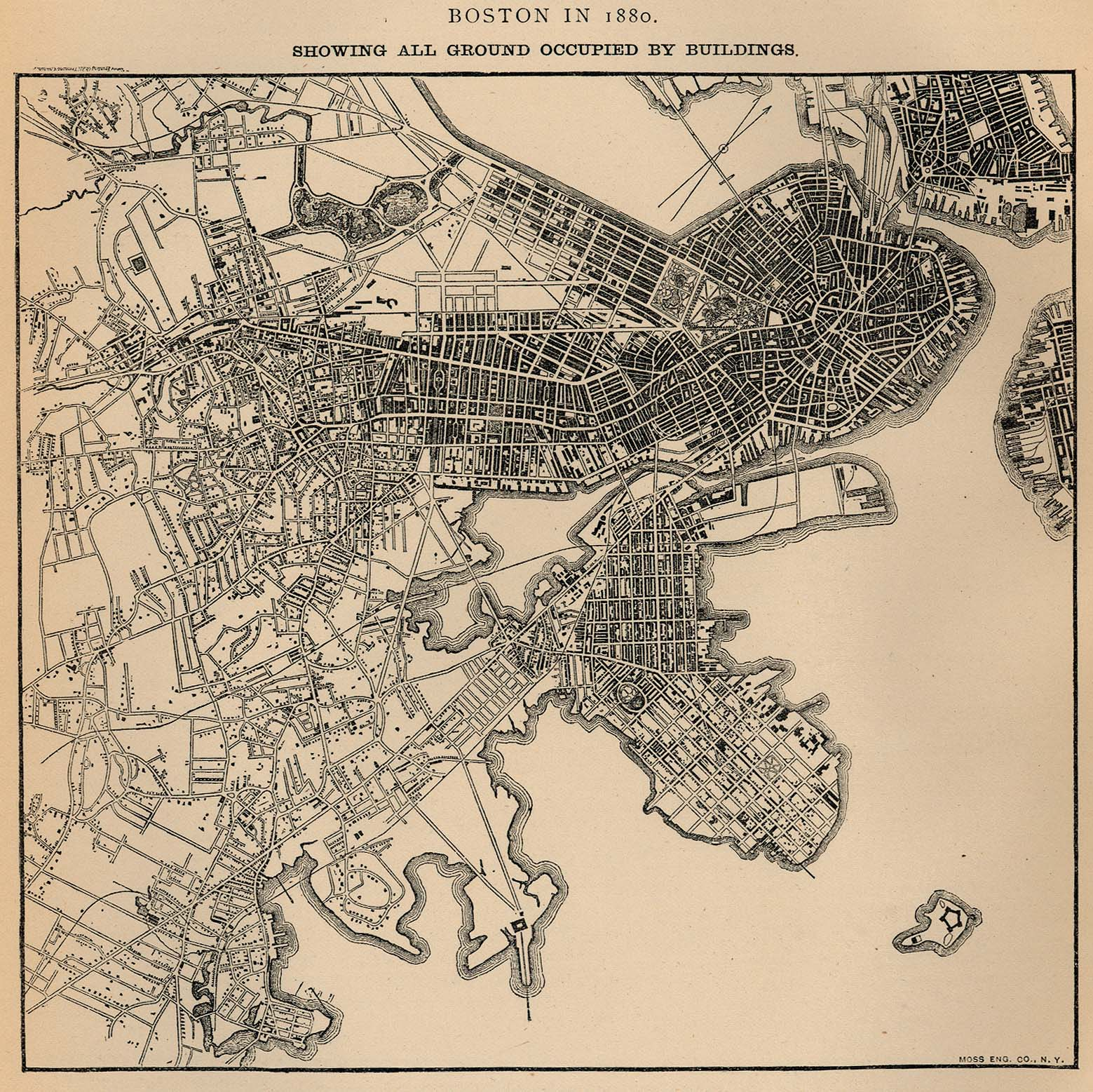
Map showing all ground in Boston occupied by buildings in 1880, soon after Dorchester was annexed to Boston in 1870. Dorchester is in the lower left quadrant. From U.S. Census Bureau.

Dorchester was annexed by Boston in pieces beginning on March 6, 1804, and ending with complete annexation to the city of Boston after a plebiscite was held in Boston and Dorchester on June 22, 1869. As a result, Dorchester officially became part of Boston on January 3, 1870. This is the historic reason that Dorchester Heights is today considered part of South Boston, not modern-day Dorchester. It was part of the earliest cession of Dorchester to Boston in 1804. Additional parts of Dorchester were ceded to Quincy (in 1792, 1814, 1819, and 1855). Portions of the original town of Dorchester developed as the separate towns of Hyde Park (1868 and later annexed to Boston in 1912), Milton (1662), and Stoughton (1726, itself later subdivided).

In 1895, Frederick Law Olmsted, architect of the Boston Public Garden/Emerald Necklace in Boston and Central Park in New York City, was commissioned to create Dorchester Park. It was intended as an urban forest for the residents of a growing Dorchester.

In 1904, the Dorchester Historical Society incorporated "Dorchester Day", which commemorated the settlement of Dorchester in 1630. Celebrated annually, Dorchester Day is a tableau of community events, highlighted by such activities as the Landing Day Observance, the Dorchester Day Parade along Dorchester Avenue the first Sunday in June, and the Community Banquet.

=== Turn of the 20th century ===
During the late 19th and early 20th centuries, Dorchester was a site for community activism related to diverse issues. The first racially integrated neighborhood developed on Jones Hill. One of the residents of that neighborhood, William Monroe Trotter, with W.E.B. Du Bois, helped to found the Niagara Movement, the precursor of the National Association for the Advancement of Colored People. Many leading suffragettes also lived in Dorchester, including Lucy Stone.

In the early 20th century, Dorchester received numerous Catholic immigrants from a variety of nations, such as Ireland, French Canada, Italy, and Poland. In addition, it was a destination for thousands of mostly Protestant African Americans from the South who were making the Great Migration to northern industrial cities for work opportunities and to escape Jim Crow violence. Numerous three-decker apartment buildings were built in Dorchester to house the many industrial workers.

=== 1950s–present ===
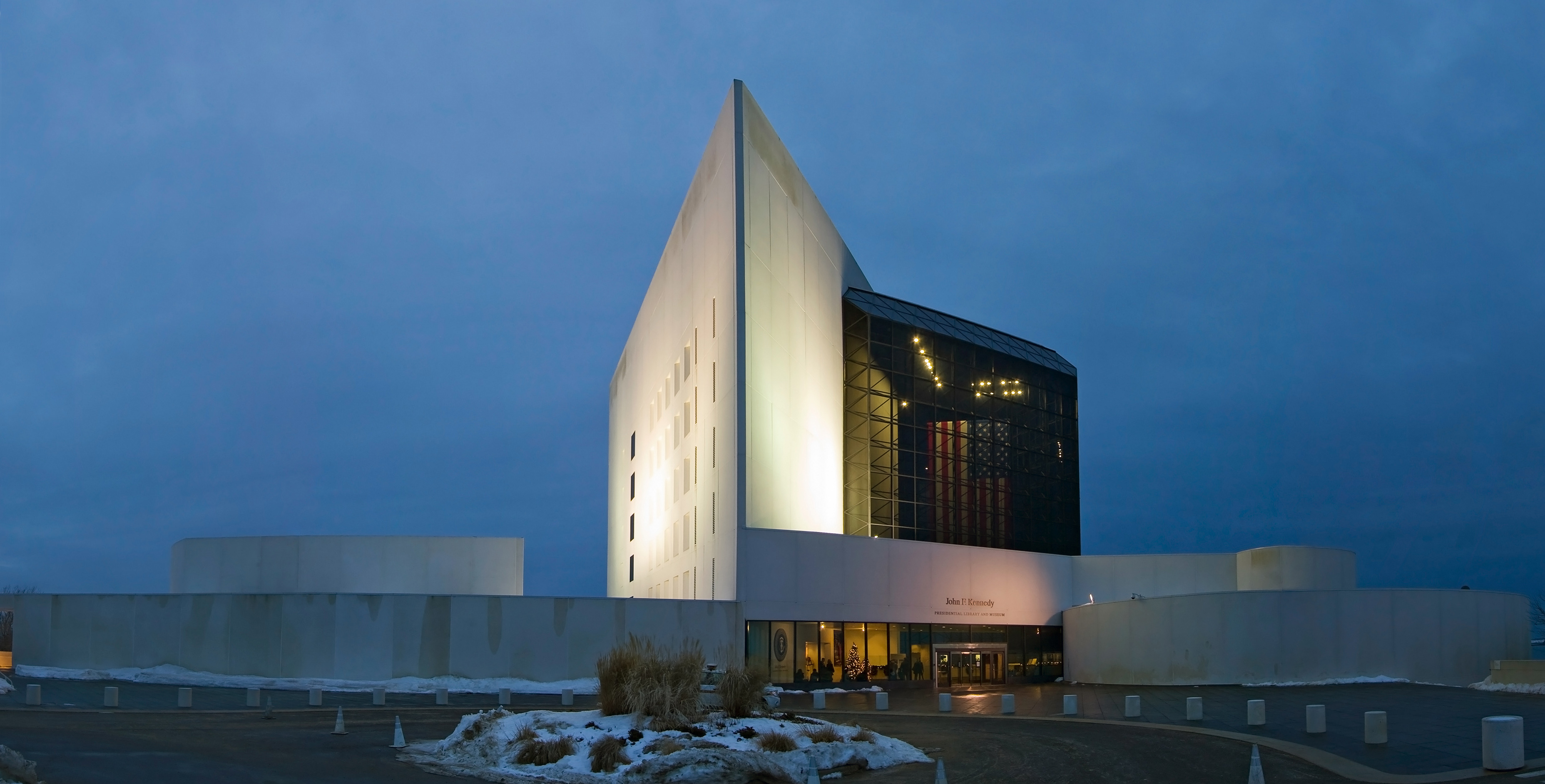
John F. Kennedy Presidential Library and Museum on the Columbia Point peninsula (2007)

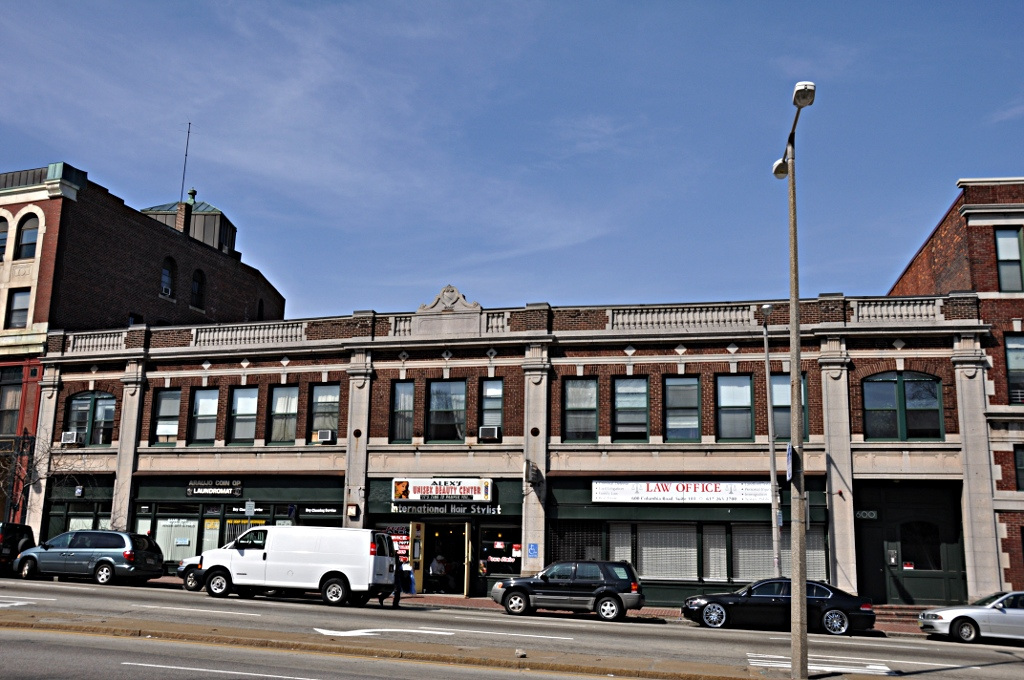
Uphams Corner section of Dorchester showing the typical urban streetscape found in the neighborhood (2010)

In the early 1950s, Dorchester became a center of civil rights activism by African Americans, who were constrained by de facto segregation in Boston. Martin Luther King Jr. lived there for much of the time he attended Boston University for his PhD.

"With Boston's Baptist community riveted by his preaching and Coretta [Scott King] at his side, King's circle grew. The Dorchester apartment drew friends and followers like a magnet, according to [friend and roommate John] Bustamante, with 'untold numbers of visitors coming from the other schools.' The roommates housed and fed the visitors, who would join in civil rights discussions."

During the 1960s–1980s, the ethnic landscape of Dorchester changed dramatically. The descendants of early 20th-century Jewish, Italian, and Irish immigrants had become more established and generally moved to newer housing in the suburbs. Newer African, Asian, and Caribbean immigrants and their descendants settled here in the older housing in a succession of ethnicities.

The first community health center in the United States was the Columbia Point Health Center in Dorchester. It was opened in December 1965 and served mostly the massive Columbia Point public housing complex adjoining it. It was founded by two medical doctors, Jack Geiger, who had been on the faculty of Harvard University and later at Tufts University; and Count Gibson from Tufts University.

Geiger had previously studied the first community health centers and the principles of Community Oriented Primary Care with Sidney Kark and colleagues while serving as a medical student in rural Natal, South Africa.

The Columbia Point Health Center is still operating and was rededicated in 1990 as the Geiger-Gibson Community Health Center.

In 1974, the University of Massachusetts Boston moved from Park Square in downtown Boston to Columbia Point in Dorchester. In 1982, Boston State College was incorporated into UMass Boston. Since the 1970s, UMass Boston has expanded substantially, including building a new campus center in 2004 and a new science center in 2015. It has also hosted numerous important social and civic events. In 2000, for example, the university hosted a presidential candidates’ debate between George W. Bush and Al Gore.

In 1977, after an unsuccessful bid by Cambridge to have the John F. Kennedy Library located there, close to the late president's alma mater Harvard University, a site was chosen at the tip of Columbia Point and ground was broken. Designed by architect I. M. Pei, the John F. Kennedy Presidential Library and Museum was dedicated on October 20, 1979.

By the 1980s, the Blue Hill Avenue section of Dorchester had become a predominantly Black community.

During the 1990s, the city administration increased police presence and invested city money into the area for more street lighting.

On March 30, 2015, the Edward M. Kennedy Institute for the United States Senate was dedicated by President Barack Obama. The Institute opened to the public on March 31, 2015.

== Geography ==
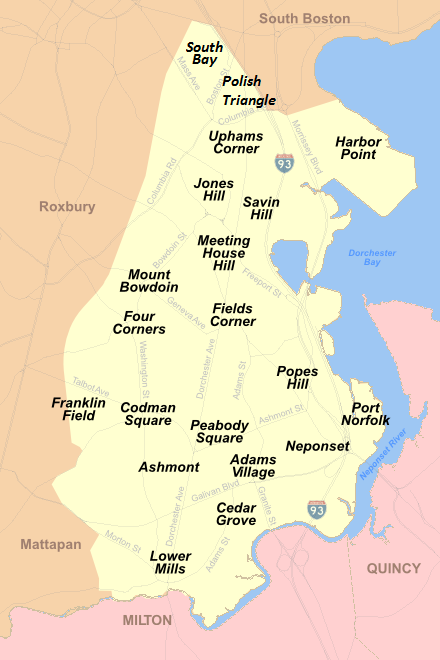
Map of the neighborhoods of Dorchester, Boston, Massachusetts

Dorchester is located south of downtown Boston and is surrounded by the neighborhoods of South Boston, Roxbury, Jamaica Plain, Hyde Park and South End, the city of Quincy and the town of Milton. The Neponset River separates Dorchester from Quincy and Milton.

=== Neighborhood sections and squares ===
Dorchester is Boston's largest and most populous neighborhood. It comprises many smaller sections and squares. Due to its size of about six square miles (16 km^{2}), it is often divided for statistical purposes into North and South Dorchester.

North Dorchester includes the portion north of Quincy, East and Freeport streets. The main business district in this part of Dorchester is Uphams Corner, at the intersection of Dudley Street and Columbia Road.

South Dorchester is bordered to the east by Dorchester Bay and to the south by the Neponset River. The main business districts in this part of Dorchester are Fields Corner, at the intersection of Dorchester Avenue and Adams Street, and Codman Square, at the intersection of Washington Street and Talbot Avenue. Adjacent to Fields Corner is the Harrison Square Historic District, also known as Clam Point. It is notable for its collection of substantial Italianate mansard residences.

Dorchester Avenue is the major neighborhood spine, running in a south–north line through all of Dorchester from Lower Mills to downtown Boston. The southern part of Dorchester is primarily a residential area, with established neighborhoods still defined by parishes, and occupied by families for generations. The northern part of Dorchester is more urban, with a greater amount of apartment housing and industrial parks. South Bay and Newmarket industrial area are major sources of employment.

The Harbor Point area (formerly known as Columbia Point) is home of several large employers, including the Boston campus of the University of Massachusetts, the Massachusetts Archives and Commonwealth Museum, the Edward M. Kennedy Institute for the United States Senate, and the John F. Kennedy Presidential Library and Museum. Distinct commercial districts include Bowdoin/Geneva, Fields Corner, Codman Square, Peabody Square, Adams Village and Lower Mills. Primarily residential areas include Savin Hill, Jones Hill, Four Corners, Franklin Field, Franklin Hill, Ashmont, Meeting House Hill, Neponset, Popes Hill and Port Norfolk.

== Demographics ==
Historical population
Census	Pop.	Note	%±
1790	1,722		—
1830	4,074		—
1840	4,875		19.7%
1850	7,969		63.5%
1860	9,769		22.6%

Up until the 1960s, the Blue Hill Avenue part of Dorchester from Roxbury to Mattapan was primarily composed of Jewish Americans whose ancestors had immigrated from eastern Europe in the late 19th and early 20th centuries. The Neponset neighborhood was primarily Irish-American, most of whom were Catholic.

During the 1920s–1960s, many African Americans moved from the South to the North during the Great Migration and settled on Blue Hill Avenue and nearby sections. While some Jewish-Americans were moving "up and out" to the suburbs, certain Boston banks and real estate companies developed a blockbusting plan for the area. The Blue Hill Avenue area was "redlined" so that only the newly arriving African Americans would receive mortgages for housing in that section. "White flight" was prevalent.

After changes to US immigration law in 1965, Dorchester received new waves of migrants from Puerto Rico, and immigrants from the Caribbean and Central America, such as Dominican Republic, Haiti, Jamaica, and Trinidad and Tobago. Immigrants also came from Cape Verde and Vietnam, as well as other Latin American, Asian, and African nations. Dorchester also continued to receive immigrants from Northern European countries such as Ireland, Germany and Poland. Dorchester became more diverse than at any point in its long history, with many nationalities represented here. These immigrants have helped revive the economy of the neighborhood by opening ethnic stores and restaurants.

The sections of Dorchester have distinct ethnic, racial, and socioeconomic compositions. The eastern areas of Dorchester (especially between Adams Street and Dorchester Bay) are primarily ethnic European and Asian, with a large population of Irish Americans and Vietnamese Americans. Residents of the western, central and parts of the southern sections of the neighborhood are predominantly African American. In Neponset, the southeast corner of the neighborhood, as well as parts of Savin Hill in the north and Cedar Grove in the south, Irish Americans maintain the most visible identity.

In the northern section of Dorchester and southwestern section of South Boston is the Polish Triangle, where recent Polish immigrants are residents. Savin Hill, as well as Fields Corner, have large Vietnamese-American populations. Uphams Corner contains a Cape Verdean-American community, the largest concentration of people of Cape Verdean origin within Boston city limits. Western, central and parts of southern Dorchester have a large Caribbean population (especially people from Haiti, Jamaica, Barbados, and Trinidad and Tobago). They are most strongly represented in the Codman Square, Franklin Field and the Ashmont area, although there are also significant numbers in Four Corners and Fields Corner.

Significant numbers of African Americans live in the Harbor Point, Uphams Corner, Fields Corner, Four Corners and Franklin Field areas. In recent years Dorchester has also seen an influx of young residents, gay men and women, and working artists (in areas such as Lower Mills, Ashmont Hill/Peabody Square, and Savin Hill).

Income – Massachusetts sales tax rate is 6.25%, income tax is 5.20%. Income per capita is $18,226 which includes adults and children. Median household income $30,419.

Based on the 2010 Census Dorchester has 114,235 for a total population. Just about 15,530 are under the age of eighteen.

=== American Community Survey – estimates – 2013 ===
The American Community Survey (ACS) for Dorchester, from 2007 to 2011, estimates the total population is 113,975 people. Slightly more than half are female, 52.6% or 59,914 and 47.4% or 54,061 are male.

In Dorchester, 68.4% or 77,980 of the residents are native born and 31.6% or 35,995 people are foreign born, of which 50.1% or 18,024 are not U.S. citizens. The largest racial group in the neighborhood is Black or African-American, with 49,612 people or 43.05% of the population. People who self-identify as white represent 26,102 or 26.99% of the community. Hispanic/Latinos account for 19.09% of the population with 19,295 residents. The Asian enclave represents 9.6% of the population with 10,990 of the citizenry. The smallest racial group identifies as bi/multi-racial and they make up 1.9% (2,174) of the population.

According to the ACS survey, Dorchester has a large under 25 population, with 38.1% or 43,472 people and 33,162 (29.1% of the total population) of them under the age of 19 years old. Between the ages of 25 and 64 years old, there are 59,788 or 52.6% people, and 10,715 people or 9.3% are more than 65 years old. In Dorchester, approximately 61.9% or 70,503 people are over the age of 25, 23.5% or 16,582 people do not have a high school diploma or GED, 30.5% or 21,479 have a diploma or GED, 18.5% or 13,045 people have completed some college, and 27.5% or 19,397 people have a college degree.

The ACS Survey estimates there are 40,443 households in the neighborhood of Dorchester, the per capita income of $22,120 and a median income of $44,136. A total of 13.1% or 5,286 households have reported income of less than $10,000. 27.3% or 11,020 households earn less than $19,999. A total of 19.1% or 7,720 households earn between $20,000 and 39,999.16.5% or 6,651 households in the earn between $40,000 and 59,999. A total of 19.7% or 7,977 households earn between $60,000 and 99,999. A total of 15.3% or 6,174 of household report annual incomes of $100,000 to 199,999. Only 2.2% or 901 households in Dorchester earn $200,000 or more per year. The ACS reports as of 2011, Poverty affects 23.5% or 9,511 households and 24.3% or 9,820 of households are receiving SNAP Benefits.

=== Race ===
Dorchester-Mount Bowdoin (02121) Racial Breakdown of Population (2017)
Race	Percentage of 02121 population	Percentage of Massachusetts population	Percentage of United States population	ZIP Code-to-State Difference	ZIP Code-to-USA Difference
Black	70.9%	8.8%	13.4%	+62.1%	+57.5%
Hispanic	28.7%	11.9%	18.1%	+16.8%	+10.6%
White	8.2%	81.3%	76.6%	–73.1%	–68.4%
White (Non-Hispanic)	2.6%	72.1%	60.7%	–69.5%	–58.1%
Asian	0.8%	6.9%	5.8%	–6.1%	–5.0%
Native Americans/Hawaiians	0.2%	0.6%	1.5%	–0.4%	–1.3%
Two or more races	5.2%	2.4%	2.7%	+2.8%	+2.5%

Dorchester-Fields Corner (02122) Racial Breakdown of Population (2017)
Race	Percentage of 02122 population	Percentage of Massachusetts population	Percentage of United States population	ZIP Code-to-State Difference	ZIP Code-to-USA Difference
White	37.7%	81.3%	76.6%	–43.6%	–38.9%
White (Non-Hispanic)	34.1%	72.1%	60.7%	–38.0%	–26.6%
Black	30.9%	8.8%	13.4%	+22.1%	+17.5%
Asian	18.4%	6.9%	5.8%	+11.5%	+12.6%
Hispanic	11.9%	11.9%	18.1%	+0.0%	–6.2%
Native Americans/Hawaiians	0.0%	0.6%	1.5%	–0.6%	–1.5%
Two or more races	3.5%	2.4%	2.7%	+1.1%	+0.8%

Dorchester-Codman Square-Ashmont (02124) Racial Breakdown of Population (2017)
Race	Percentage of 02124 population	Percentage of Massachusetts population	Percentage of United States population	ZIP Code-to-State Difference	ZIP Code-to-USA Difference
Black	64.4%	8.8%	13.4%	+55.6%	+61.0%
White	22.6%	81.3%	76.6%	–58.7%	–54.0%
White (Non-Hispanic)	16.3%	72.1%	60.7%	–55.8%	–44.4%
Hispanic	15.8%	11.9%	18.1%	+3.9%	–2.3%
Asian	6.2%	6.9%	5.8%	–0.7%	+0.4%
Native Americans/Hawaiians	1.1%	0.6%	1.5%	+0.5%	–0.4%
Two or more races	2.9%	2.4%	2.7%	+0.5%	+0.2%

Dorchester-Uphams Corner-Savin Hill-Columbia Point (02125) Racial Breakdown of Population (2017)
Race	Percentage of 02125 population	Percentage of Massachusetts population	Percentage of United States population	ZIP Code-to-State Difference	ZIP Code-to-USA Difference
White	34.2%	81.3%	76.6%	–47.1%	–42.4%
White (Non-Hispanic)	30.4%	72.1%	60.7%	–41.7%	–30.3%
Black	29.7%	8.8%	13.4%	+20.9%	+16.3%
Hispanic	20.3%	11.9%	18.1%	+8.4%	+2.2%
Asian	12.8%	6.9%	5.8%	+5.9%	+7.0%
Native Americans/Hawaiians	0.5%	0.6%	1.5%	–0.1%	+1.0%
Two or more races	5.1%	2.4%	2.7%	+2.7%	+2.4%

=== Ancestry ===
According to the 2012-2016 American Community Survey 5-Year Estimates, the largest ancestry groups in ZIP Codes 02121, 02122, 02124, and 02125 are:

Ancestry	Percentage of 02121 population	Percentage of Massachusetts population	Percentage of United States population	ZIP Code-to-State Difference	ZIP Code-to-USA Difference
West Indian	15.53%	1.96%	0.90%	+13.57%	+14.62%
Puerto Rican	10.76%	4.52%	1.66%	+6.24%	+9.10%
Sub-Saharan African	7.82%	2.00%	1.01%	+5.82%	+6.81%
Haitian	7.18%	1.15%	0.31%	+6.02%	+6.87%
Jamaican	4.22%	0.44%	0.34%	+3.78%	+3.88%
Cape Verdean	3.92%	0.97%	0.03%	+2.95%	+3.89%
American	2.84%	4.26%	6.89%	–1.42%	–4.05%
Somali	1.57%	0.06%	0.04%	+1.50%	+1.52%

Ancestry	Percentage of 02122 population	Percentage of Massachusetts population	Percentage of United States population	ZIP Code-to-State Difference	ZIP Code-to-USA Difference
Irish	18.94%	21.16%	10.39%	–2.22%	+8.55%
Vietnamese	16.67%	0.69%	0.54%	+15.98%	+16.13%
Sub-Saharan African	10.85%	2.00%	1.01%	+8.85%	+9.84%
Cape Verdean	8.57%	0.97%	0.03%	+7.60%	+8.54%
Italian	6.43%	13.19%	5.39%	–6.75%	+1.04%
West Indian	5.61%	1.96%	0.90%	+3.65%	+4.70%
Puerto Rican	4.67%	4.52%	1.66%	+0.15%	+3.01%
American	3.55%	4.26%	6.89%	–0.71%	–3.34%
Haitian	2.36%	1.15%	0.31%	+1.21%	+2.05%
Polish	1.93%	4.67%	2.93%	–2.73%	–1.00%
English	1.66%	9.77%	7.67%	–8.12%	–6.01%
Jamaican	1.59%	0.44%	0.34%	+1.15%	+1.25%
German	1.39%	6.00%	14.40%	–4.61%	–13.01%
Asian Indian	1.19%	1.39%	1.09%	–0.20%	+0.10%
French	1.09%	6.82%	2.56%	–5.74%	–1.47%

Ancestry	Percentage of 02124 population	Percentage of Massachusetts population	Percentage of United States population	ZIP Code-to-State Difference	ZIP Code-to-USA Difference
West Indian	19.04%	1.96%	0.31%	+17.08%	+18.14%
Haitian	8.14%	1.15%	0.31%	+6.99%	+7.83%
Irish	7.97%	21.16%	10.39%	–13.18%	–2.41%
Sub-Saharan African	7.54%	2.00%	1.01%	+5.54%	+6.52%
Puerto Rican	7.50%	4.52%	1.66%	+2.98%	+5.84%
Jamaican	5.39%	0.44%	0.34%	+4.95%	+5.04%
Vietnamese	4.83%	0.69%	0.54%	+4.14%	+4.29%
Cape Verdean	3.96%	0.97%	0.03%	+2.99%	+3.93%
American	2.74%	4.26%	6.89%	–1.53%	–4.16%
Trinidadian/Tobagonian	2.62%	0.10%	0.07%	+2.52%	+2.55%
English	2.23%	9.77%	7.67%	–7.54%	–5.44%
Italian	2.16%	13.19%	5.39%	–11.03%	–3.23%
German	1.29%	6.00%	14.40%	–4.72%	–13.12%
Barbadian	1.14%	0.08%	0.02%	+1.05%	+1.12%
Guyanese	1.11%	0.03%	0.07%	+1.08%	+1.04%

Ancestry	Percentage of 02125 population	Percentage of Massachusetts population	Percentage of United States population	ZIP Code-to-State Difference	ZIP Code-to-USA Difference
Sub-Saharan African	15.27%	2.00%	1.01%	+13.27%	+14.26%
Cape Verdean	13.02%	0.97%	0.03%	+12.05%	+12.98%
Irish	9.34%	21.16%	10.39%	–11.82%	–1.05%
American	9.07%	4.26%	6.89%	+4.81%	+2.18%
Vietnamese	7.33%	0.69%	0.54%	+6.64%	+6.79%
Puerto Rican	6.90%	4.52%	1.66%	+2.38%	+5.24%
West Indian	5.26%	1.96%	0.90%	+3.30%	+4.36%
Italian	3.18%	13.19%	5.39%	–10.00%	–2.21%
Chinese	3.03%	2.28%	1.24%	+0.75%	+1.79%
Polish	2.92%	4.67%	2.93%	–1.75%	–0.02%
German	2.32%	6.00%	14.40%	–3.69%	–12.08%
English	2.12%	9.77%	7.67%	–7.66%	–5.55%
Haitian	1.94%	1.15%	0.31%	+0.79%	+1.64%
Albanian	1.50%	0.28%	0.06%	+1.22%	+1.44%
Arab	1.44%	1.10%	0.59%	+0.35%	+0.85%
Mexican	1.29%	0.67%	11.96%	+0.62%	–10.67%
Asian Indian	1.20%	1.39%	1.09%	–0.19%	+0.11%
French	1.05%	6.82%	2.56%	–5.77%	–1.51%

=== Crime ===
Dorchester, with a population of approximately 130,000, is home to nearly one-fifth of all Boston residents. In the early 1990s, Dorchester, along with Roxbury and Mattapan, had the highest percentage of victims with violence-related injuries. Since the early 2000s, crime rates across Boston have declined. In the first three months of 2013, Boston crime rates reportedly dropped 15% compared to the same time period in 2012.

According to the Dorchester Reporter crime maps, the more dangerous areas in Dorchester are west of Columbia Road, with criminal activity centered on the Blue Hill Avenue area. Safer parts of the neighborhood include Savin Hill; the historic neighborhood of Clam Point; Columbia Point, which is populated by mostly UMass Boston students; Ashmont Hill; Saint Mark's; Pope's Hill; Cedar Grove; Lower Mills, around the Neponset, Gallivan, and Morrissey Boulevard areas; and the Jones Hill neighborhood (with the third-largest percentage of same-sex households in Boston after the South End and Jamaica Plain).

According to AreaVibes, Dorchester's overall crime rate circa 2017 was 30% higher than the national average. For every 100,000 people there are 10.55 daily crimes in the neighborhood. Property crime is much more common than violent crime. Out of 100,000 people, 831 are involved in violent crime, and 3,021 out of 100,000 are involved in property crime.

The chance in 2014 of being a victim of:

- Property crime = 1 in 34
- Violent crime = 1 in 121
- Crime = 1 in 26

== Economy ==
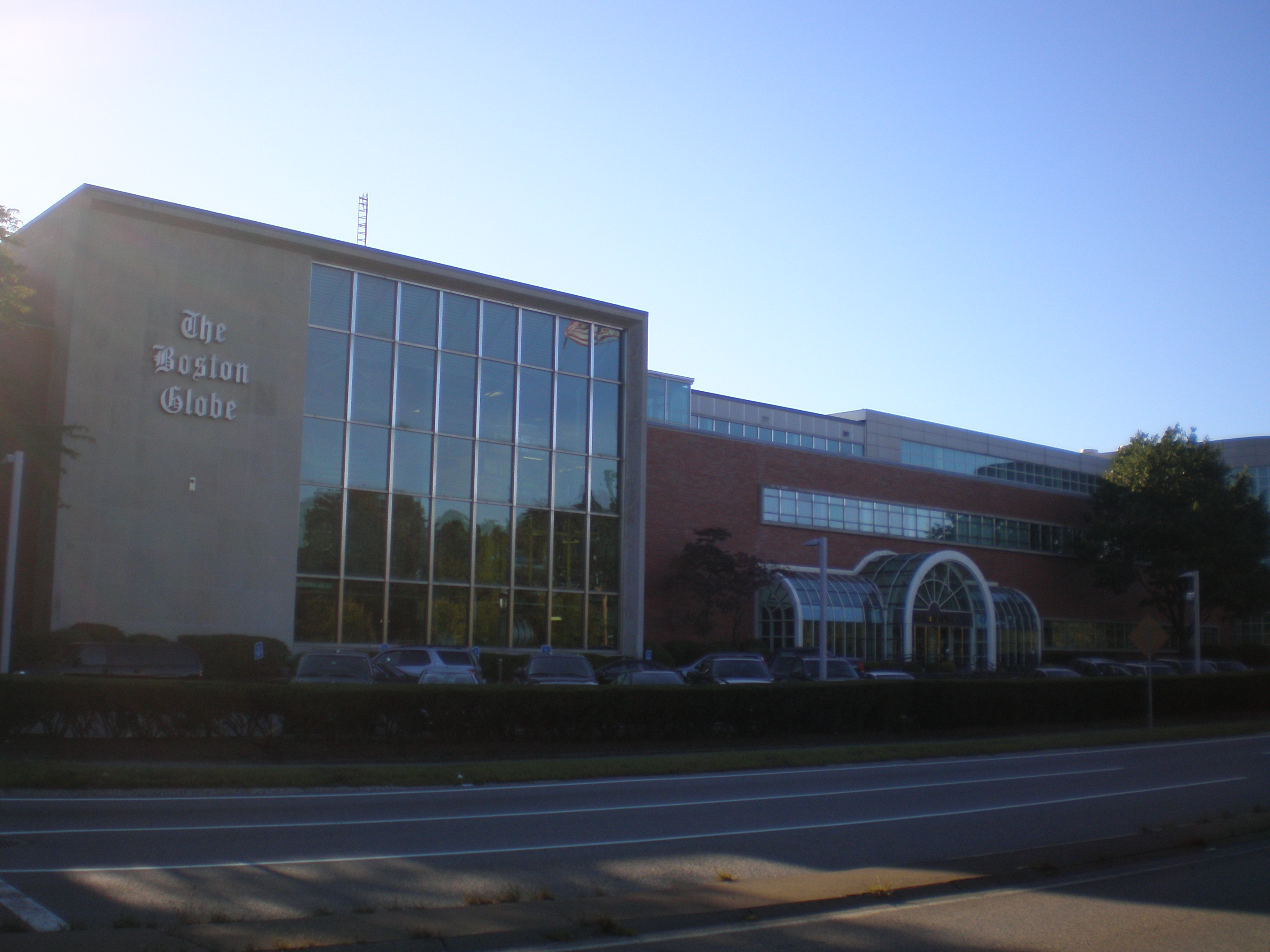
The headquarters of the Boston Globe were located on Morrissey Boulevard in Dorchester from 1958 to 2017. This picture is from 2009.

Throughout its history, Dorchester has had periods of economic revival and recession. In the 1960s and 1970s, Dorchester was particularly hard hit by economic recession, high unemployment, and white flight.

In 1953, Carney Hospital moved from South Boston to its current location in Dorchester, serving the local communities of Dorchester, Mattapan, Milton and Quincy. It closed in 2025.

In 1953, a major public housing project was completed on the Columbia Point peninsula of Dorchester. There were 1,502 units in the development on 50 acres (200,000 m^{2}) of land. It later became known for high rates of crime and poor living conditions, and it went through particularly bad times in the 1970s and 1980s. By 1988, there were only 350 families living there. In 1984, the City of Boston gave control of it to a private developer, Corcoran-Mullins-Jennison, who redeveloped the property into a residential mixed-income community called Harbor Point Apartments which was opened in 1988 and completed by 1990. It was the first federal housing project to be converted to private, mixed-income housing in the United States. Harbor Point has won much acclaim for this transformation, including awards from the Urban Land Institute, the FIABCI Award for International Excellence, and the Rudy Bruner Award for Urban Excellence.

During the housing crisis of 2008 in the United States, Dorchester's Hendry Street became the epicenter in the media In reaction, the city of Boston negotiated to buy several of the houses for as little as $30,000. It is moving to seize other foreclosed properties on which the owners have not paid taxes. The houses were renovated and added to the inventory of subsidized rental housing.

In 2008, plans and proposals were unveiled and presented to public community hearings by the Corcoran-Jennison Company to redevelop the 30-acre (120,000 m^{2}) Bayside Exposition Center site on the Columbia Point peninsula into a mixed use village of storefronts and residences, called "Bayside on the Point". However, in 2009, the Bayside Expo Center property was lost in a foreclosure on Corcoran-Jennison to a Florida-based real estate firm, LNR/CMAT, who bought it. Soon after, the University of Massachusetts Boston bought the property from them to build future campus facilities.

The corporate headquarters of The Boston Globe was also located in Dorchester, having moved there in 1958 from downtown Boston. In 2009, then-owner The New York Times Company put the paper up for bid, leading to concern from local community members, who had seen other major employers close their doors. After negotiations with their union and cost reduction measures, the owner's plans to sell the Globe were abandoned in October 2009. In 2013, the paper was bought by John W. Henry, owner of the Boston Red Sox, and in 2017 the Globe headquarters returned to downtown Boston.

In the 20th century, many of the labor unions in Boston relocated their headquarters to Dorchester. This includes the Boston Teachers Union, International Brotherhood of Electrical Workers Local 103, New England Regional Council of Carpenters, International Association of Fire Fighters Local 718, among others.

== Arts and culture ==
=== Public libraries ===
Boston Public Library operates six neighborhood branches in Dorchester.

- Adams Street Branch
- Codman Square Branch – Originally opened at 6 Norfolk Street in 1905. The branch moved into its current facility, which was designed by Eco-Texture, Inc., in 1978.
- Fields Corner Branch
- Grove Hall Branch
- Lower Mills Branch
- Uphams Corner Branch

=== Sites of interest ===
Additional sites of interest include:

- Bayside Expo Center (also known as the Bayside Expo and Conference Center), originally opened as a shopping mall in the 1960s and in 2010 sold to University of Massachusetts Boston for future redevelopment
- The Boston Globe building
- Captain Lemuel Clap House
- Commonwealth Museum
- Massachusetts Archives
- Dorchester Park
- Edward M. Kennedy Institute for the United States Senate
- First Parish Church of Dorchester
- Franklin Park Zoo
- James Blake House
- John F. Kennedy Presidential Library and Museum
- Neponset River State Reservation
- University of Massachusetts Boston Harbor Campus
- William Clapp House
- William Monroe Trotter House
- Eire Pub, visited by presidents and prime ministers and political candidates

=== Entertainment ===
Dorchester has various attractions, including the John F. Kennedy Presidential Library and Museum, Edward M. Kennedy Institute for the United States Senate, Boston Winery, Boston Harbor Distillery, Strand Theatre, Commonwealth Museum, Greater Boston House Concert, Franklin Park Zoo, the Neponset Rivery Greenway and Lower Neponset River Trail.

Fields Corner is a commercial center that is one of Dorchester's largest business districts. It has numerous restaurants and pubs, and independent clothing stores. Fields Corner is known both for its ethnic Irish residents, who support a variety of Irish pubs, and for Vietnamese restaurants operated by more recent immigrants. Adjacent to Fields Corner is an 11-acre park known as Hilltop Park, which offers a view of Dorchester Bay and plenty of green space.

== Parks and recreation ==
Parks include:

- Pope John Paul II Park Reservation: The Pope John Park Reservation is approximately 66 acres in size, and is open year-round for the residents of Dorchester. In its earlier times it was used as a landfill and also a drive-in theatre. It also serves as a buffer between the Town of Dorchester, Boston and Neponset River waterfront. This park now offers picnic facilities, soccer fields, play areas, paths for walking, and also spacious land to plant trees and shrubs.
- Dorchester Park: Dorchester park was established in 1861 and is located in the southern part of Dorchester, specifically in the Cedar Grove and Lower Mills. It is across from the Neponset River. Dorchester Park is 30 acres. Events held at the park include the Annual Classic Car Show and Family Fun Day. Dorchester Park is listed in the National Register of Historic Places.
- Franklin Park: Established in 1885, this park has 485 acres. It includes walking and running paths, tennis courts, baseball fields, golf courses, and basketball courts. New England's Franklin Park Zoo has nine main exhibits that contain more than 220 species of animals. The Kite and Bike festival traditionally takes place in Franklin park. This event, hosted since 2010 by the Franklin Park Coalition, is usually held the Saturday after Mother's Day. It includes bike riding and kite flying.
- Senator Joseph Finnegan Park: Previously a dumping ground for hazardous waste, the park was inaugurated in 2017 after a $4.25 million investment from the State of Massachusetts. It is named after Joseph Finnegan (senator), who served from 1930 to 1934 as a state senator in the Massachusetts senate. During his tenure, Finnegan had defeated a proposal from the Boston Gas Company to build gas tanks along the coastline. His son John J. Finnegan, who served as a representative to the Massachusetts House of Representatives between 1967 and 1981, pledged in his first election campaign to restore the waterfront, though the project was not completed until decades after he left office.

=== Bike trails ===
- Lower Neponset River Trail: This 2.4-mile path stretches from the historic Port Norfolk neighborhood in Dorchester, through Pope John Paul II Park, across Granite Avenue through Neponset Marshes, and through the Lower Mills area to Central Avenue in Milton. This trail is used for running, biking, and walking. The Neponset River Trail can be reached from the Butler, Milton Village, and Central Avenue Red Line (Mattapan trolley) stations.
- Neponset River Green way: The Neponset River Green way totals 5 miles in length. Scenery includes a salt marsh in Pope John Paul Park II and Tenan Beach at the mouth of Neponset River. Conveniently the trail is also adjacent to MBTA Red Line stations: Butler, Milton, and Central Avenue.
- DotGreenway: a greenway for pedestrians and cyclists has been proposed to connect Talbot Avenue and Park Street along the MBTA Red Line tunnel cap (between Ashmont and Fields Corner stations).

== Government ==
Mayor Marty Walsh proposed a budget for 2017 which included a five-year capital plan intended to make improvements to the infrastructure of Dorchester. The new projects involve building new libraries and also modernizing the Boston Public Libraries branches in Dorchester. Improvement of City parks is also included. The plans are to add more lights to Doherty-Gibson park in Fields Corner and another $3.7 million to make improvements in Harambee park next to the Franklin Field. The rest of the budget is intended to be used to complete already started projects in Savin Hill, King Street, Hemenway, Dower Avenue, and Ronan Park.

== Education ==
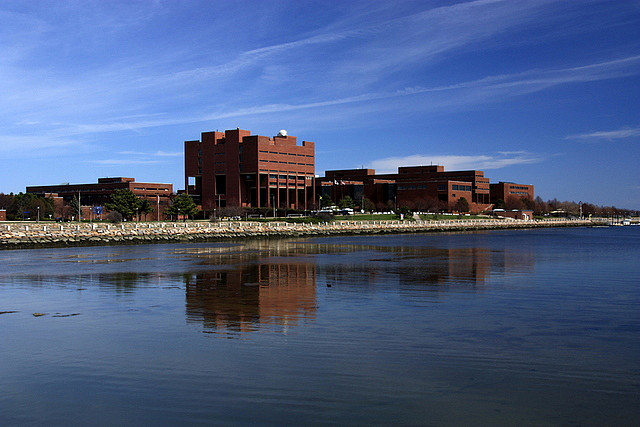
The University of Massachusetts Boston is located on Columbia Point in Dorchester (2009).

=== Primary and secondary schools ===
==== Public schools ====
Students in Dorchester are served by Boston Public Schools (BPS). BPS assigns students based on preferences of the applicants and priorities of students in various zones.

Dorchester High School predated the annexation of Dorchester to Boston. At its founding, it was an all-male school, first opened on December 10, 1852. In 1870 Dorchester was annexed to Boston and its schools became managed by the City of Boston. A replacement facility opened in Codman Square on Talbot Avenue 1901. The current Dorchester facility opened in 1925 on Peacevale Road to males, while the Talbot Avenue building became Dorchester High School for Girls. In 1953 Dorchester High School consolidated as a coeducational school.

BPS schools located in Dorchester include

- Boston Arts Academy, 9–12
- Boston Community Leadership Academy/McCormack, 7–9
- Boston International Newcomers Academy, 9–12
- Boston Latin Academy, 7–12
- Jeremiah E. Burke High School, 9–12
- Clap Elementary, K1–5
- Community Academy of Science & Health, 9–12
- Paul A. Dever Elementary, K1–6
- Edward Everett Elementary, K1–5
- Lilla G. Frederick Pilot Middle School, 6–8
- Sarah Greenwood, K0–8
- Dr. William W. Henderson Inclusion School (formerly Patrick O'Hearn Elementary School), K0–12
- Oliver Wendell Holmes Innovation School, K1–5
- Thomas J. Kenny Elementary, K1–6
- Martin Luther King Jr., K1–8
- Lee Academy Pilot School, K0–3
- Joseph Lee, K1–8
- Mather Elementary, K1–5
- Richard J. Murphy, K1–8
- William E. Russell Elementary, K1–5
- Pauline A. Shaw Elementary, K0–3
- TechBoston Academy, 6–12
- Charles H. Taylor, K1-5
- William Monroe Trotter, K1–8
- UP Academy Dorchester, K1–8 (in-district charter)
- UP Academy Holland, K1–5 (in-district charter)
- John Winthrop Elementary, K1–5

Charter schools include

- Boston Collegiate Charter School, 5–12
- Brooke High School, 9–12
- Codman Academy Charter Public School, K1–12
- Conservatory Lab Charter School, K1–8
- Helen Y. Davis Leadership Academy Charter Public School, 6–8
- Neighborhood House Charter School, K1–12
- Roxbury Prep Dorchester Campus, 5–8

==== Catholic schools ====
Many Catholic schools closed in the 2000s as the demographics of the area changed.

The remaining schools as of summer 2018 are:

- Boston College High School, 7–12
- Cristo Rey Boston High School, 9–12, leasing the old St. William Elementary building
- St. Brendan School, K-6
- Three locations of the Pope John Paul II Catholic Academy part of the Roman Catholic Archdiocese of Boston remain after the 2008 consolidation of seven parish elementary schools into five locations.
  - Columbia Campus (former St. Margaret's Elementary School building)
  - Lower Mills Campus (former St. Gregory Elementary School building)
  - Neponset Campus (former St. Ann Elementary School building)

=== Colleges and universities ===
- The University of Massachusetts Boston is an accredited urban public research university and the second largest campus in the University of Massachusetts system. It is located on Columbia Point in Dorchester. The school offers associates, bachelors, masters and doctoral degrees. In regards to race and gender, the school has a diverse student population of about 13 thousand students at a time. Excluding financial aid, the average cost of tuition is $12,000 for in-state students, and $28,000 for out-of-state. The university is rated as a good value, with a 15:1 student faculty ratio and a variety of majors to study. The economy of the school has been consistently productive since its establishment. Within the past twenty years, the school campuses have been improving and expanding. Some 95% of the students are in-state and attending classes full-time.
- Labouré College is a Roman Catholic co-educational college offering associate degrees in nursing and the health sciences. It is located on the Carney Hospital campus near the Lower Mills section of Dorchester.

== Infrastructure ==
=== Transportation ===
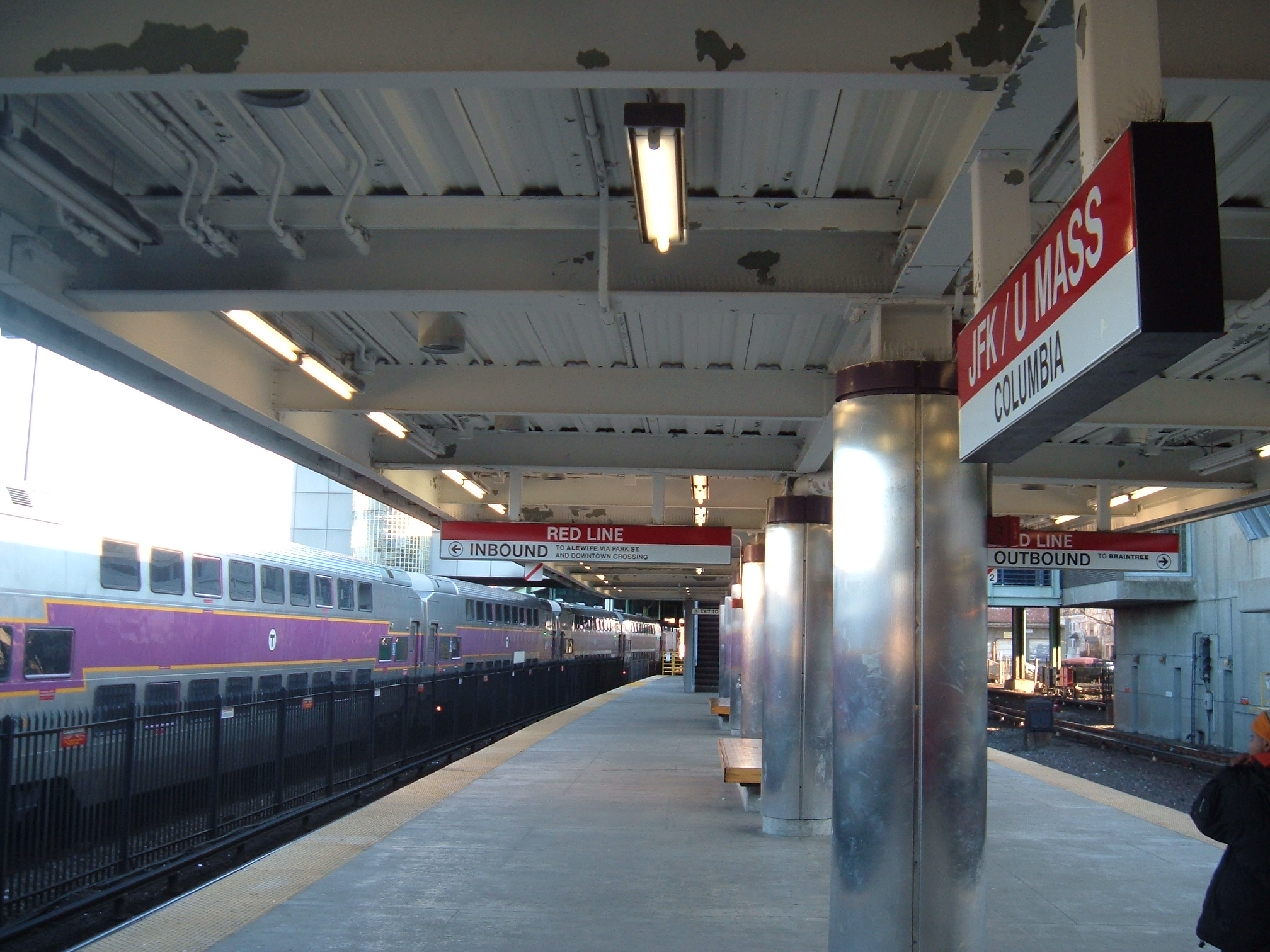
The Red Line MBTA platform at the JFK/UMass station with a commuter rail at the station (2007)

The neighborhood is served by five stations on the Massachusetts Bay Transportation Authority Red Line (MBTA) rapid transit service, five stations on the Mattapan Line, five stations on the Fairmount Commuter Rail Line, and various bus routes.

Interstate 93 (concurrent with Route 3 and U.S. 1) runs north–south through Dorchester between Quincy, Massachusetts, and downtown Boston, providing access to the eastern edge of Dorchester at Columbia Road, Morrissey Boulevard (northbound only), Neponset Circle (southbound only), and Granite Avenue (with additional southbound on-ramps at Freeport Street and from Morrissey Blvd at Neponset). Several other state routes traverse the neighborhood, e.g., Route 203, Gallivan Boulevard and Morton Street, and Route 28, Blue Hill Avenue (so named because it leads out of the city to the Blue Hills Reservation). The Neponset River separates Dorchester from Quincy and Milton. The Dorchester Turnpike (now Dorchester Avenue) stretches from Fort Point Channel (now in South Boston) to Lower Mills, and once boasted a horse-drawn streetcar.

A number of the earliest streets in Dorchester have changed names several times through the centuries, meaning that some names have come and gone. Leavitt Place, for instance, named for one of Dorchester's earliest settlers, eventually became Brook Court and then Brook Avenue Place. Gallivan Boulevard was once Codman Street and Brookvale Street was once Brook Street. Morrissey Boulevard was once Old Colony Parkway.

=== Housing ===
Most of Dorchester's population, about 63.3% or 72,239 people, lives in rental housing. The gross median monthly rent is $1,450, which totals $17,400 per year and exceeds the income of almost 30% of the population. An estimated 40,180 people (35.3%) live in owner-occupied homes and 1.4% or 1556 residents live in group homes/shelters.

Excluding government-owned housing, Dorchester has 15,918 residential buildings including 4,344 or 27.3% single-family homes, 3,674 or 23.1% two-family homes, 3,919 or 24.6% three-family homes, and 3,981 or 25.0% condo units. The median sales price for all residential property types is 244,450. In 2013, there were 52 foreclosures petitions reported in Dorchester, representing 22.41% of the 232 foreclosures reported for the entire City Boston. Subsequently, 37 out 147 distressed buildings documented in Boston are located in Dorchester.

== Notable people ==
- Charles Baker Adams – born in Dorchester; academic and naturalist
- William Taylor Adams – wrote fiction under pseudonym "Oliver Optic," served on Dorchester school board
- Sheldon Adelson – born and raised in Dorchester; chairman and CEO of Las Vegas Sands Corporation and conservative political financier
- Samuel Turell Armstrong – born in Dorchester; 6th Mayor of Boston and Lieutenant Governor of Massachusetts
- Major General Humphrey Atherton (born c. 1608–1661), an early settler of Dorchester, who held the highest military rank in colonial New England
- Brigadier General Stephen Badlam, cabinetmaker and artillery officer in the Revolutionary War
- Robert Bergenheim – raised in Dorchester; founder of Boston Business Journal
- Ray Bolger – vaudevillian and film actor, best known as Scarecrow in classic movie The Wizard of Oz (1939)
- Jean Buckley – born in Dorchester; All-American Girls Professional Baseball League player
- Whitey Bulger – crime boss, head of Winter Hill Gang, subject of film Black Mass
- William M. Bulger – politician, former President of the Massachusetts Senate and president of University of Massachusetts
- Herb Chambers – owner and CEO of Herb Chambers Companies, car dealerships
- Buddy Clark - easy-listening-jazz singer
- Terrence Clarke - college basketball player
- Arthur Colgan - Roman Catholic bishop
- James B. Conant - born in Dorchester; chemist and president of Harvard University (1933-1953)
- Joe Conforte – owner of Mustang Ranch brothel in Nevada
- Clarence Cook – born in Dorchester; 19th Century art critic and writer
- Michael L. Coyne – trial attorney and professor, co-founder and Dean of Massachusetts School of Law
- Norm Crosby – entertainer
- Brian J. Donnelly — born and raised in Dorchester, Ambassador to Trinidad and Tobago, Congressman, and Massachusetts State Representative
- Julia Knowlton Dyer — philanthropist
- Ayo Edebiri - raised in Dorchester, actress and comedian
- Thomas M. Finneran – former Speaker of the Massachusetts House of Representatives; in 2007, pleaded guilty to felony obstruction of justice
- Tom Fitzgerald, ice hockey and golf journalist
- Ann Davison Duffie Fleck – 34th DAR President General
- Roswell Gleason – 19th century manufacturer of pewter and silver-plate
- Mike Gorman – TV play-by-play announcer for Boston Celtics
- Harry G. Hamlet – Commandant of U.S. Coast Guard 1932–36, attended high school in Dorchester
- Kay Hanley – alternative rock musician, vocalist for band Letters to Cleo
- Childe Hassam born and raised in Dorchester, painter and member of the Ten American Painters
- Kevin Hayes – born in Dorchester, professional ice hockey player for the St. Louis Blues
- Chrystal Herne – Broadway actress
- Richard M. Karp – raised in Dorchester; Turing Award-laureate computer scientist
- Joseph P. Kennedy – businessman, political figure, father of President John F. Kennedy, Robert F. Kennedy and Edward M. "Ted" Kennedy
- Rose Kennedy – mother of John F. Kennedy, Robert F. Kennedy, and Edward M. "Ted" Kennedy
- John King – broadcast journalist, host of Inside Politics on CNN
- Jonathan Knight – singer, musical group New Kids on the Block
- Jordan Knight – singer, New Kids on the Block
- Calixa Lavallée – Canadian national anthem composer, wrote offertorium for dedication of St. Peter's of Dorchester (1883)
- Dennis Lehane – raised in Dorchester; author of Gone Baby Gone, Mystic River, Shutter Island; screenwriter, producer
- Lisa-Jayne Lewis - lived in Dorchester 2000–2006; British broadcaster and Eurovision Song Contest commentator
- Gladys Edson Locke — lived and died in Dorchester; writer and librarian
- Alexandra Lydon – born in Dorchester; actress and writer
- Bill Marshall – professional baseball player of the 1930s
- John Mason – Colonial military officer, civil engineer
- Increase Mather – Puritan minister; public figure in early history of Massachusetts Bay Colony
- Aaron Maund – professional soccer player
- Albert and David Maysles – documentary filmmakers
- Bill McColgan – sports announcer
- Neal McDonough Actor
- Marilyn Mosby – raised in Dorchester; former state's attorney of Baltimore
- John Lothrop Motley – historian and diplomat
- Mark Mulvoy – journalist and writer for The Boston Globe and Sports Illustrated
- Adam Myerson – professional cyclist
- Leonard Nimoy – born in Dorchester; actor, director, poet, musician, and photographer; best known as Spock on Star Trek
- Bill O'Brien – born in Dorchester; head coach of NFL's Houston Texans
- Lawrence O'Donnell – raised in Dorchester; former aide to Senator Daniel Patrick Moynihan, producer of The West Wing and host of MSNBC's The Last Word with Lawrence O'Donnell
- Rose Pitonof (1895–1984) – marathon swimmer
- Martin Richard – raised in Dorchester; one of three people killed in Boston Marathon bombing
- Richard Scarry – raised in Dorchester; children's books author and illustrator, known for his "Busytown" universe
- Henry Austin Scudder – moved to Dorchester and represented it in the state legislature
- Elliot Silverstein – raised in Dorchester; directed Cat Ballou and four episodes of The Twilight Zone
- Slaine – hip-hop MC, rapper and actor, Gone Baby Gone and The Town
- Lucy Stone – abolitionist and suffragist
- Donna Summer – pop and disco singer, member of Rock and Roll Hall of Fame
- Emily Sweeney - Boston Globe staff writer, author
- Amelia Peabody Tileston (1872-1920), American Red Cross worker in Serbia during World War I
- Donnie Wahlberg – singer, actor and film producer, member of musical group New Kids on the Block, star of TV series Blue Bloods
- Mark Wahlberg – Academy Award-nominated actor, producer, model and rapper, star of films including Boogie Nights, The Perfect Storm, Ted, The Departed and The Fighter
- Marty Walsh – Mayor of Boston
- Elizabeth Foster Wesselhoeft - born in Dorchester; children's literature writer
- Carolina White – born in Dorchester; soprano and actress
- John Willis – gangster
- Danny Wood – singer, musical group New Kids on the Block
- Marie Wright – better known by stage name "Free", media personality
