= Edward Everett Square =

Coordinates: 42°19′13.7″N 71°03′41.5″W

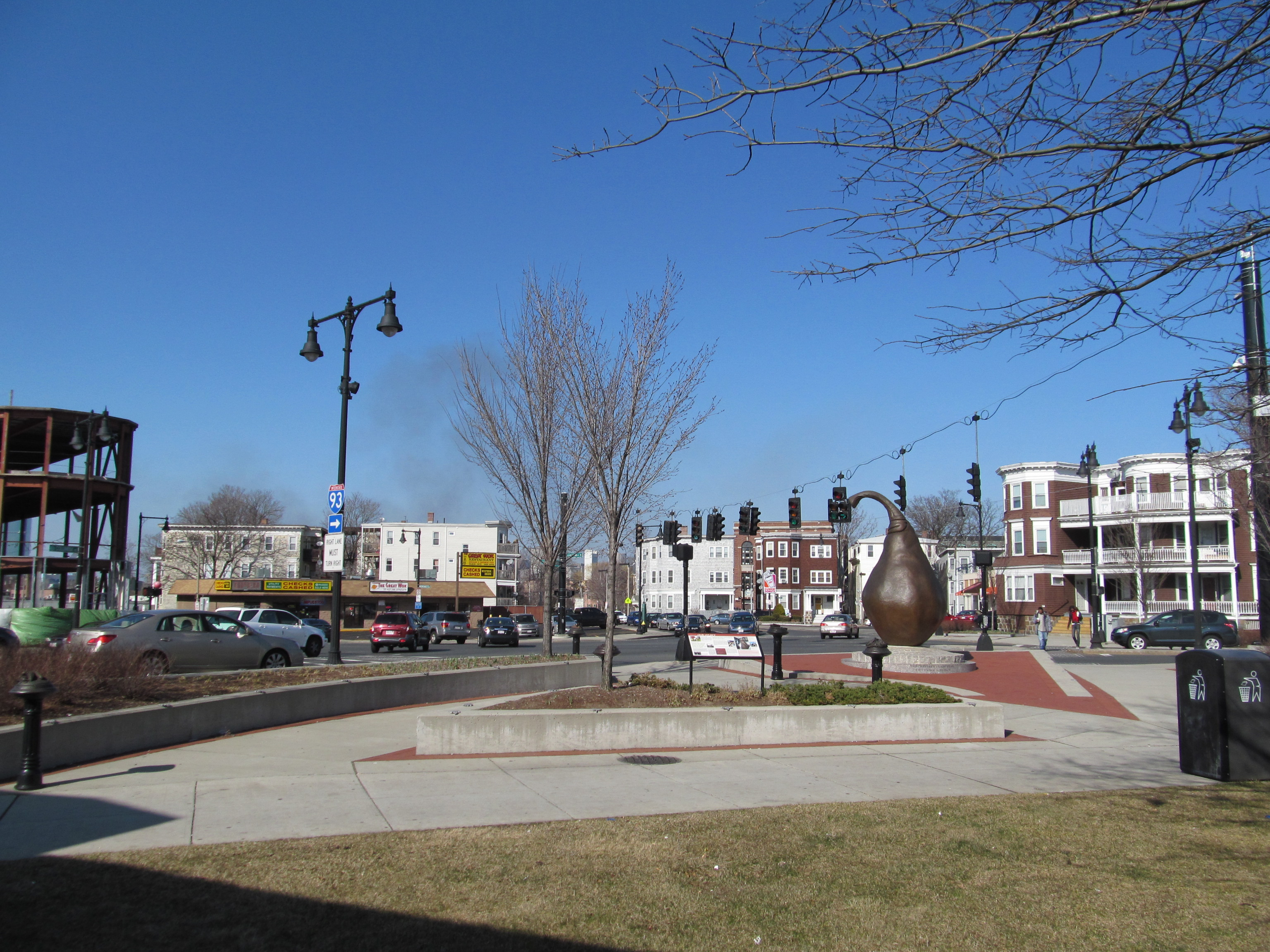
Edward Everett Square

Edward Everett Square, in Dorchester, Boston, is the intersection of Columbia Road, Massachusetts Avenue, East Cottage Street and Boston Street, that was named in 1894 after a former governor of Massachusetts, Edward Everett, who was born near there.

In 1995 efforts were undertaken by the local community to redevelop the square, with major milestones being completed in 2007. On June 16, 2007, Mayor Thomas M. Menino dedicated the new square marking the completion of the current phase of the project. The centerpiece of the project, a statue by Laura Baring-Gould of a giant Clapp Pear (a variety of pear that was developed in Dorchester in the nineteenth century) now sits at the corner of East Cottage Street and Columbia Road.

== The James Blake House ==
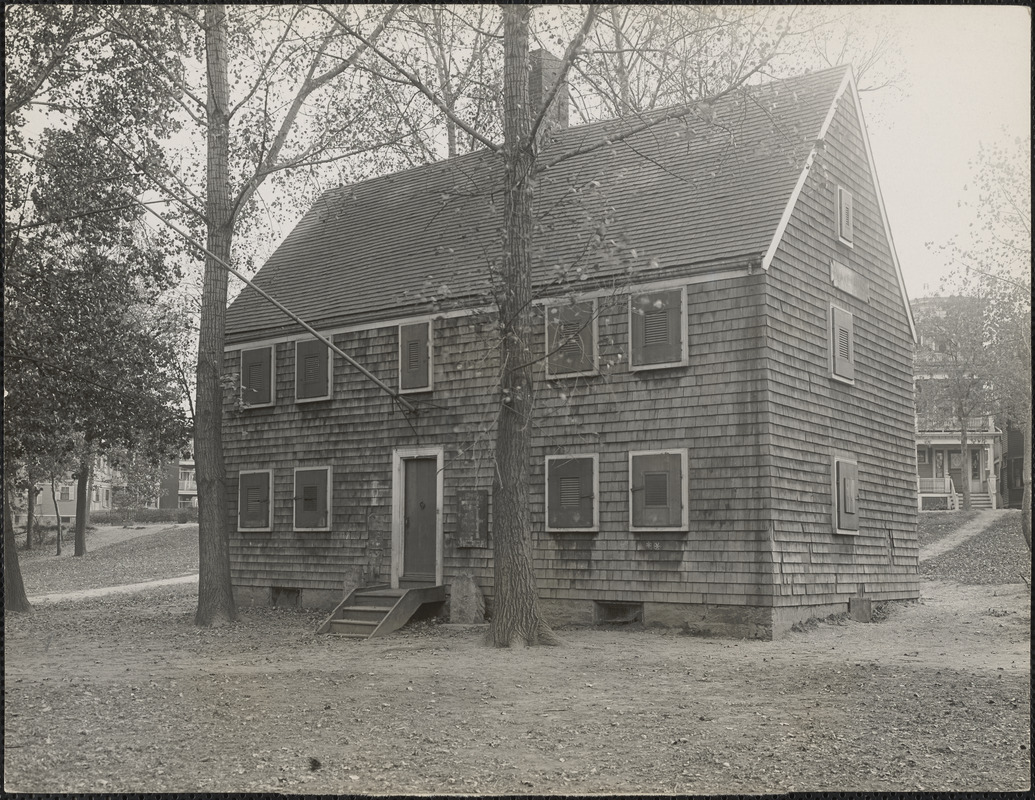
The house in October 1920

The James Blake House is a historic house at 735 Columbia Road near the square. It was built around 1650.
