= Elizabeth Foster Wesselhoeft =

American writer of children's books

- Born: October 21, 1840; Dorchester
- Died: January 31, 1919 (aged 78)
- Occupation: Writer
- Spouse(s): Conrad Wesselhoeft

Elizabeth Foster Pope Wesselhoeft (21 October 1840 – 31 January 1919) was an American writer. She wrote eighteen children's books under the name Lily F. Wesselhoeft.

Elizabeth Foster Pope was born on 21 October 1840 in Dorchester, Boston. In 1863, she married Dr. Conrad Wesselhoeft, a prominent doctor who was the personal physician of Louisa May Alcott and the Alcott family. In her forties, she began writing children's books. Many of her works were about dogs, and others were fantasy stories with fairy tale elements, influenced by Alcott's fantasy works.

Elizabeth Foster Wesselhoeft died on 31 January 1919.

== Bibliography ==
- Sparrow, the Tramp (1888)
- Flipwing, the Spy (1889)
- The Winds, the Woods, and the Wanderer (1890)
- Old Rough the Miser (1891), illustrated by Jonathan Francis Goodridge
- Frowzle the Runaway (1895)
- The fairy-folk of Blue Hill (1895)
- Jerry the Blunderer (1896)
- Torpeanuts the Tomboy (1897)
- Old Sultan's Thanksgiving and other stories (1898)
- Madam Mary of the Zoo (1899)
- Doris and her dog Rodney (1900)
- Foxy the Faithful (1902)
- Jack, the Fire Dog (1903)
- Ready the Reliable (1906)
- The Diamond King and the Little Man in Gray (1907)
- Rover the Farm Dog (1908)
- Laddie: The Master of the House (1913)
