= Eire Pub =

Irish pub in Dorchester, Massachusetts

- Interactive map of Eire Pub

Restaurant information
- Food type: pub
- Location: 795 Adams Street, Boston, Massachusetts
- Coordinates: 42°16′59″N 71°3′22″W

The Eire Pub is an Irish pub in Dorchester, Massachusetts, U.S., located at 795 Adams Street.

President Ronald Reagan and then future president Bill Clinton both visited the pub; since then, stopping at Eire Pub has become a superstition for political candidates hoping to follow in Reagan and Clinton's footsteps. Bertie Ahern, the then-Prime Minister of Ireland, visited the pub in 2008.

Martin Nicholson, bartender at the Eire Pub for 33 years, retired in 2010.
