= John A. Fox =

American architect

John Andrews Fox
- Born: December 23, 1835; Newburyport, Massachusetts
- Died: May 4, 1920 (aged 84); Dorchester, Boston
- Occupation: Architect

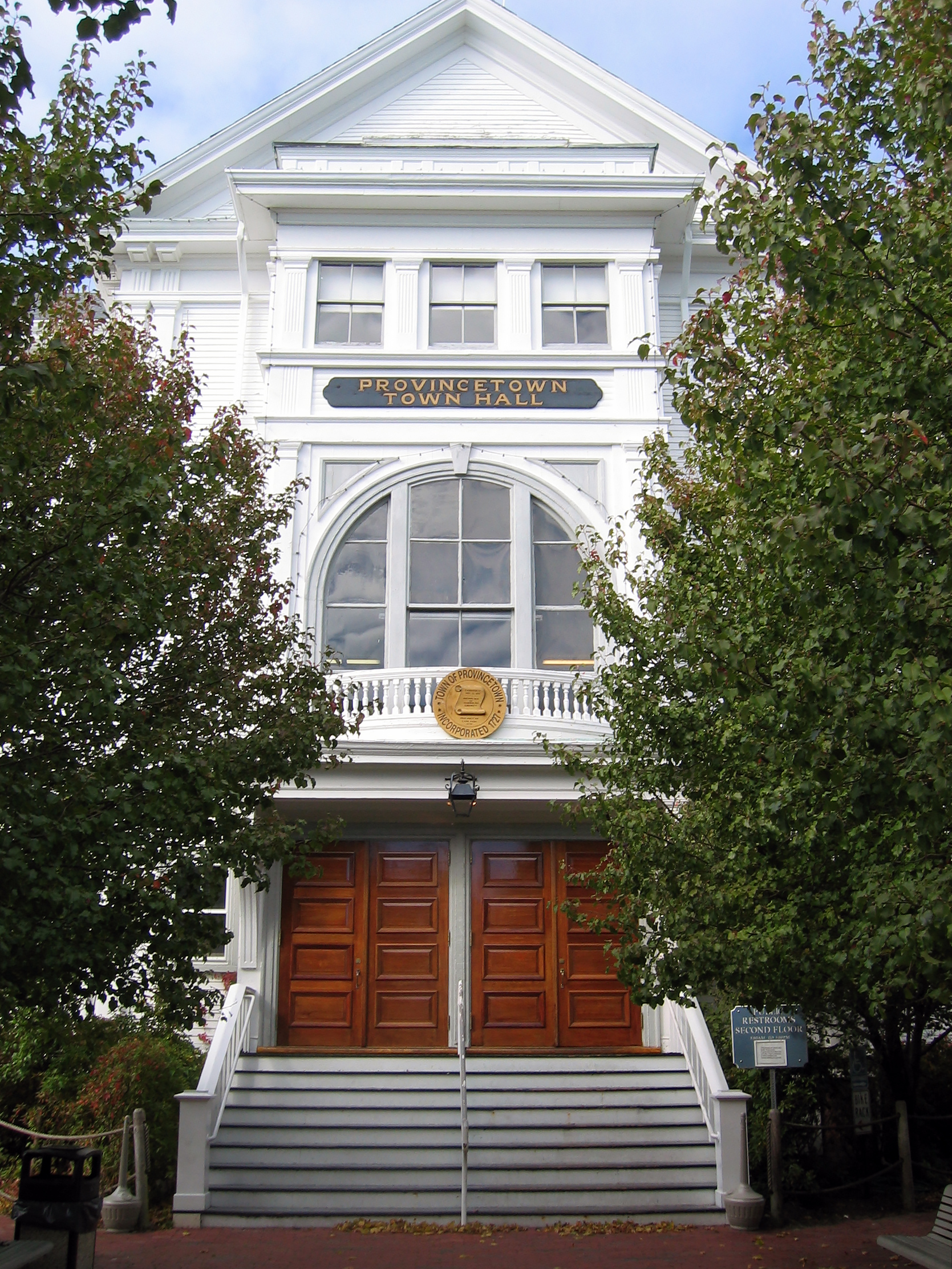
The Provincetown Town Hall, designed by Fox and completed in 1886.

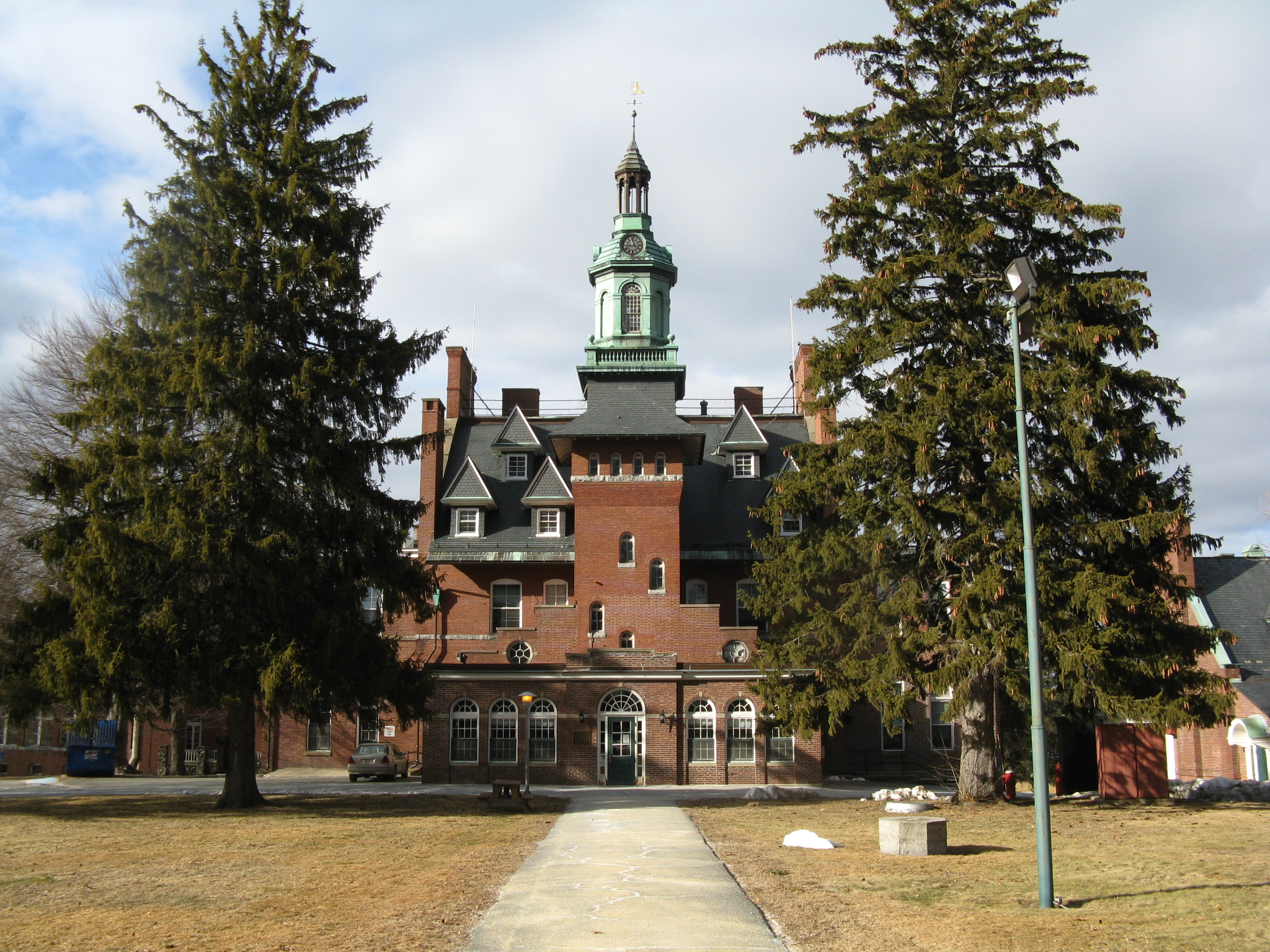
The Administration Building at the former Tewksbury Hospital, completed in 1894.

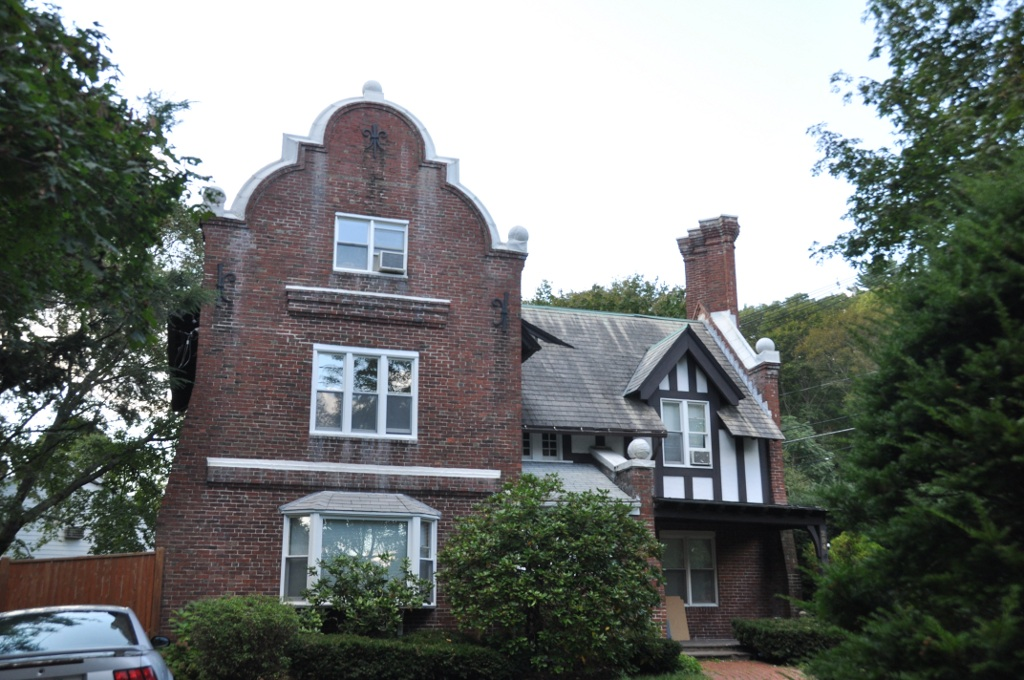
The Cornelia Warren cottage in Waltham, completed circa 1901.

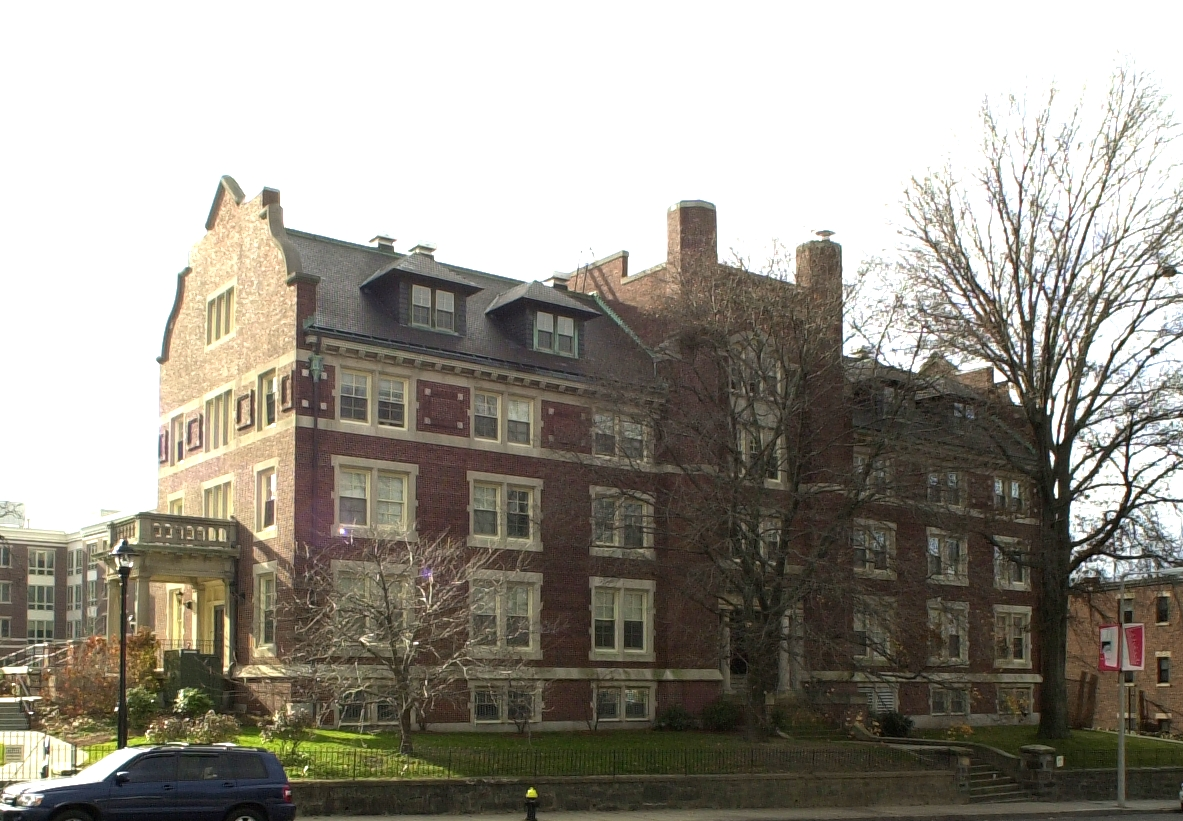
The Columbus Building of the Home for Aged Couples in Jamaica Plain, completed in 1910.

John A. Fox (1835–1920) was an American architect. Fox practiced in Boston for fifty years and is best remembered for his works in the Stick Style.

== Life and career ==
John Andrews Fox was born December 23, 1835, in Newburyport, Massachusetts, to Thomas Bayley Fox, pastor of the First Religious Society, and Feroline Walley (Pierce) Fox. In 1845 the family moved to Dorchester, where Fox was educated. He initially trained as a civil engineer and surveyor, working for Garbett & Wood and Whitwell & Henck, with whom he worked on the initial surveys for the Back Bay. In 1858 he joined the office of Boston architect Benjamin F. Dwight, with whom he remained until the outbreak of the Civil War. In 1862 he was commissioned second lieutenant of the 2nd Massachusetts Infantry Regiment, and was promoted to first lieutenant and later adjudant. He participated in the Chattanooga campaign and Sherman's March to the Sea. He was mustered out July 26, 1865. For two years he worked for Ware & Van Brunt before returning to Dwight in 1867. He remained with Dwight until 1870, when he established his own practice in Boston.

His experience with Dwight, known as an architect of theatres, led to several major theatre and hall projects for Fox in the 70s and 80s. In his later career he designed major buildings for several state institutions. Fox would become known primarily as an architect of suburban homes in Dorchester and elsewhere, though he did not consider himself a specialist. Fox practiced architecture for fifty years, until his death in 1920.

Fox joined the American Institute of Architects in 1875, and was elevated to Fellow in 1889.

== Personal life ==
In 1867 Fox was brevetted a major for his "faithful and meritorious services." Fox married Josephine Clapp of Boston in 1878. They had no children. The couple lived in a house of Fox's own design at 25 Trull Street in Dorchester. Fox died May 4, 1920, at home in Dorchester.

== Legacy ==
The Boston historian Anthony Mitchell Sammarco has referred to Fox as the "Father of Stick Style architecture." Vincent Scully has identified him as an early innovator of the style, though his Stick Style works are preceded by a decade by those of Richard Morris Hunt, Henry Hobson Richardson and others.

Architect S. Edwin Tobey worked in Fox's office in the late 1870s before opening his own office in 1880. Curtis W. Bixby was a later associate, and was involved on several of Fox's projects for state institutions.

Several of Fox's works, including the campus of the Tewksbury Hospital, have been listed on the United States National Register of Historic Places. Others contribute to listed historic districts.

== Architectural works ==
- Providence Opera House, 115 Dorrance St, Providence, Rhode Island (1871, demolished 1931)
- Tileston School (former), 412 Ann St, Wilmington, North Carolina (1871–72, altered)
- Chelsea Academy of Music, 179-189 Winnisimmet St, Chelsea, Massachusetts (1872, burned 1905)
- House for J. Homer Pierce, 14 Bellevue St, Dorchester, Boston, Massachusetts (1872)
- Frye Block and Music Hall, 71 Lisbon St, Lewiston, Maine (1877)
- Houses for Franklin King, 19-21 Trull St, Dorchester, Boston, Massachusetts (1877)
- House for James D. Scudder, 6 Dewolf St, Dorchester, Boston, Massachusetts (1877)
- House for John A. Fox, 25 Trull St, Dorchester, Boston, Massachusetts (1878)
- Houses for Franklin King, (Note: 24 Trull was destroyed by fire circa 1980.) 24-26 Trull St, Dorchester, Boston, Massachusetts (1878, partially extant)
- Double house for Mary E. Noyes, 26-28 Mill St, Dorchester, Boston, Massachusetts (1879)
- House for Thomas G. Wales, 30 Mill St, Dorchester, Boston, Massachusetts (1879)
- House for Samuel J. Barrows, 51 Sawyer Ave, Dorchester, Boston, Massachusetts (1881)
- House for Benjamin B. Converse, 18 Monadnock St, Dorchester, Boston, Massachusetts (1881)
- House for William W. Cross, 55 Green St, Brockton, Massachusetts (1881, demolished)
- Building for George H. Homans and John Homans, 115 Chauncy St, Boston, Massachusetts (1882–83, demolished 1922)
- House for Capt. Smith W. Nichols, 24 Beaumont St, Dorchester, Boston, Massachusetts (1883)
- Remodeling of house for Lewis W. Tappan Jr., (Note: Originally built in 1782 for Col. Samuel Swift.) 278 Adams St, Milton, Massachusetts (1883)
- City Theatre, 50 Main St, Brockton, Massachusetts (1884, demolished 1954)
- House for Dexter J. Cutter, 15 Blanche St, Dorchester, Boston, Massachusetts (1884)
- Pedestal of Daniel Webster, New Hampshire State House Grounds, Concord, New Hampshire (1885–86)
- House for Charles H. Tilton, 403 Marlborough St, Boston, Massachusetts (1886–87)
- Provincetown Town Hall, 260 Commercial St, Provincetown, Massachusetts (1886)
- Thomas Building, 58 Winter St, Boston, Massachusetts (1887)
- 110th Pennsylvania Infantry Monument, Gettysburg National Military Park, Gettysburg, Pennsylvania (1889)
- Pedestal of General John Stark, New Hampshire State House Grounds, Concord, New Hampshire (1890)
- House for Frank C. Churchill, 3 Campbell St, Lebanon, New Hampshire (1892)
- Sewall Maternity Building, New England Hospital for Women and Children, 55 Dimock St, Roxbury, Boston, Massachusetts (1892 and 1916)
- Walnut Building, Home for Aged Couples, 2055 Columbus Ave, Jamaica Plain, Boston, Massachusetts (1892, NRHP 2005)
- House for William C. Clapp, 179 Boston St, Dorchester, Boston, Massachusetts (1893)
- Administration and other buildings, Tewksbury Hospital, 365 East St, Tewksbury, Massachusetts (1894 et seq., NRHP 1994)
- Chelmsford Public Library, 25 Boston Rd, Chelmsford, Massachusetts (1894)
- House for Herbert J. Blodgett, 71 Addington Rd, Brookline, Massachusetts (1894)
- 2nd and 33rd Massachusetts Infantry Monument, Orchard Knob Reservation, Chattanooga, Tennessee (1895)
- Engine 30 and Ladder 25 Fire Station, 1940 Centre St, West Roxbury, Boston, Massachusetts (1897–98)
- Boston Fire Department Veterinary Hospital, Atkinson St, Dorchester, Boston, Massachusetts (1899-1900, demolished)
- Engine 22 and Ladder 13 Fire Station, 70 Warren Ave, Boston, Massachusetts (1900–01)
- Chemical 7 Fire Station, 360 Saratoga St, East Boston, Boston, Massachusetts (1901, altered)
- Cottage for Cornelia Warren, 294 Linden St, Waltham, Massachusetts (1901, NRHP 1989)
- Various buildings, Gardner State Hospital (former), (Note: Now the North Central Correctional Institution.) Gardner, Massachusetts (1902 et seq.)
- Samuel W. Mason School, 150 Norfolk Ave, Roxbury, Boston, Massachusetts (1905)
- Goddard Home for Nurses, New England Hospital for Women and Children, 55 Dimock St, Roxbury, Boston, Massachusetts (1909)
- Columbus Building, Home for Aged Couples, 2055 Columbus Ave, Jamaica Plain, Boston, Massachusetts (1910, NRHP 2005)
- Hotel Rogers (former), 39 N Park St, Lebanon, New Hampshire (1911)

== Gallery of architectural works ==
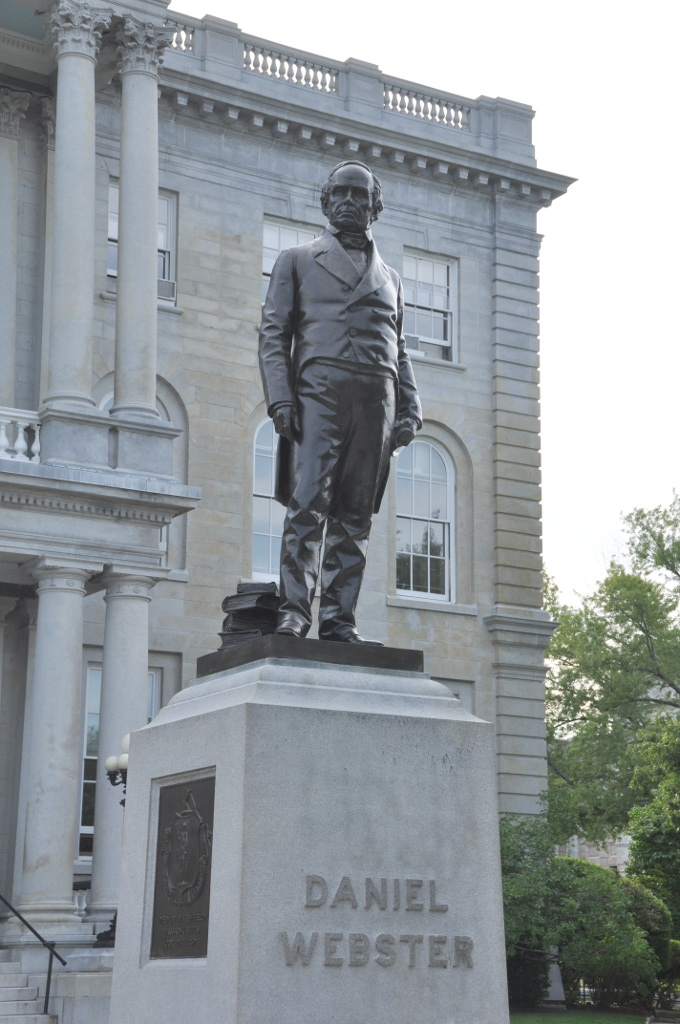
Pedestal of Daniel Webster New Hampshire State House Grounds, Concord, New Hampshire, 1885-86.

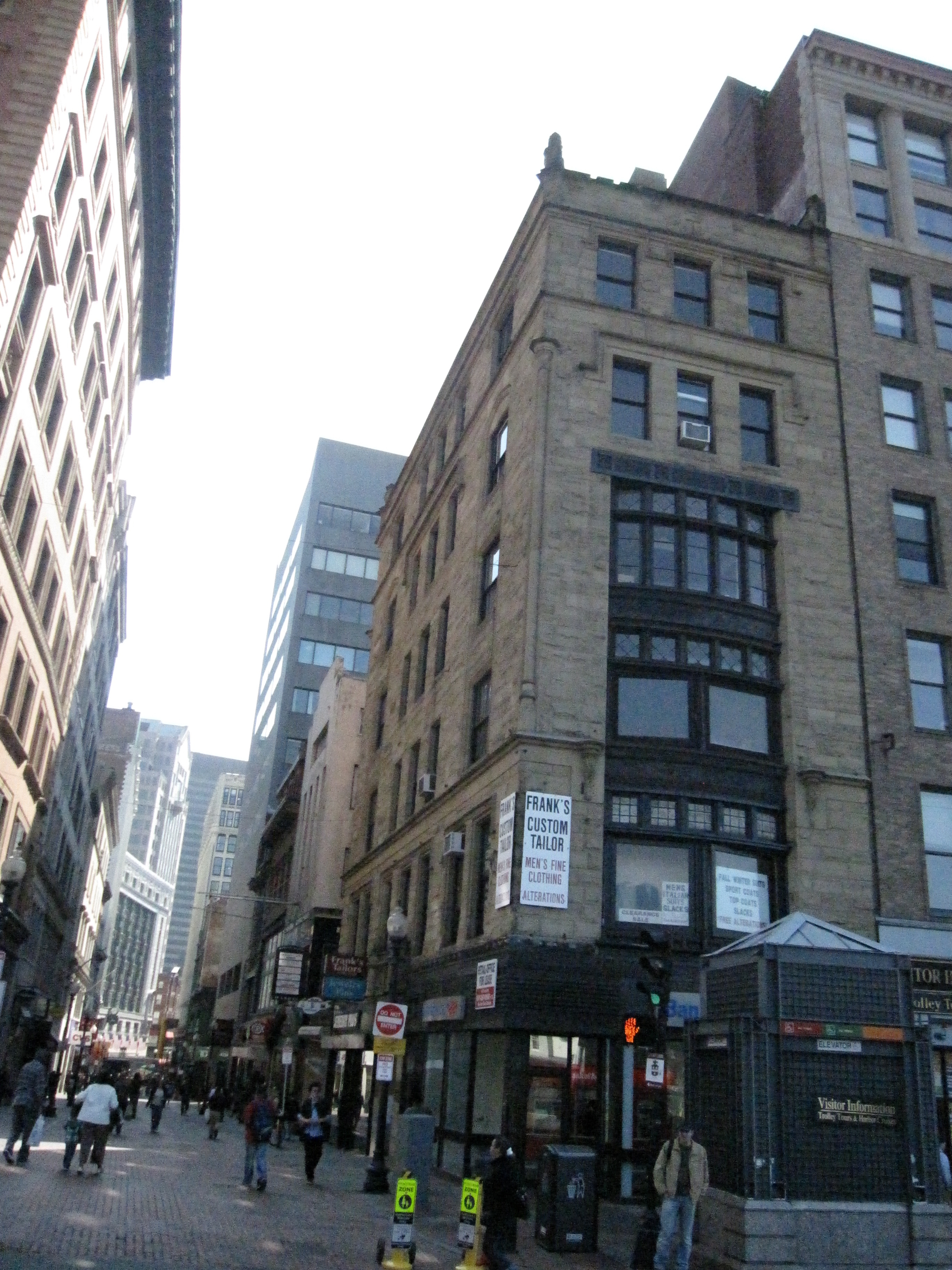
Thomas Building, Boston, Massachusetts, 1887.

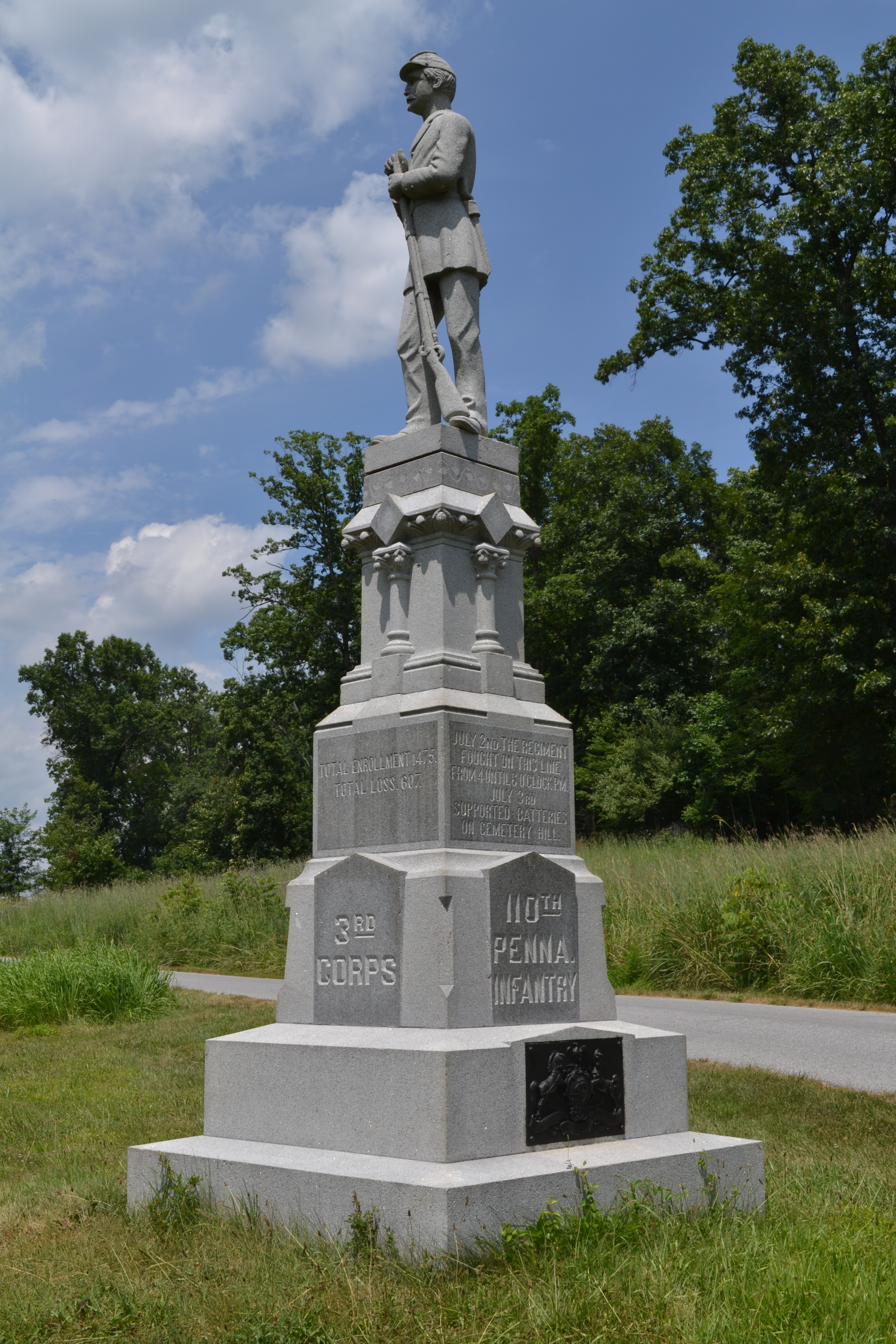
110th Pennsylvania Infantry Monument, Gettysburg National Military Park, Gettysburg, Pennsylvania, 1889.

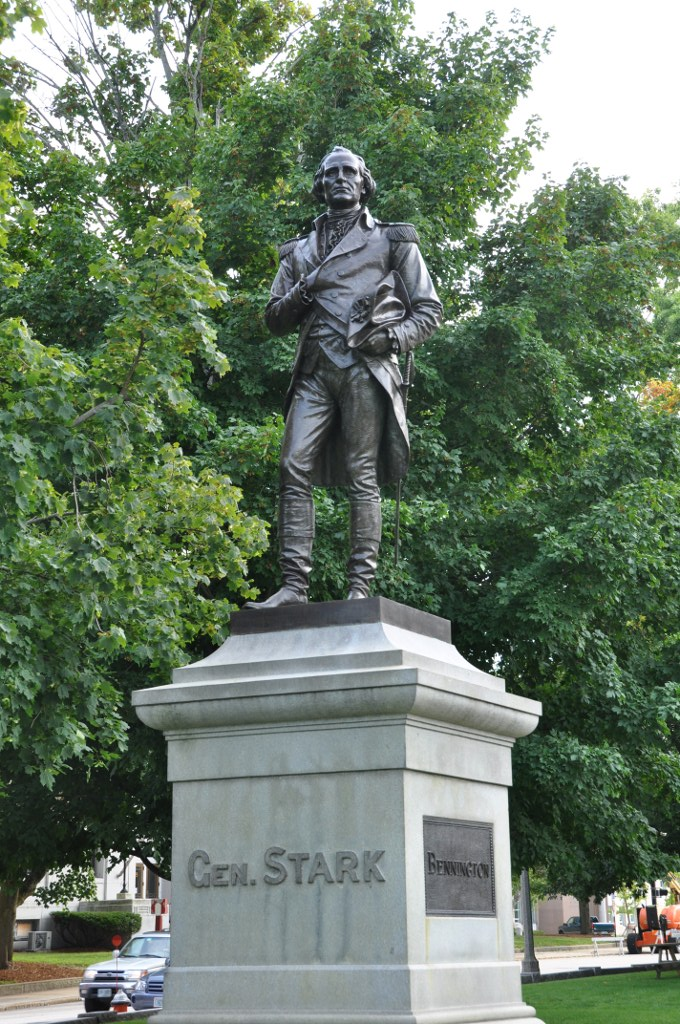
Pedestal of General John Stark New Hampshire State House Grounds, Concord, New Hampshire, 1890.

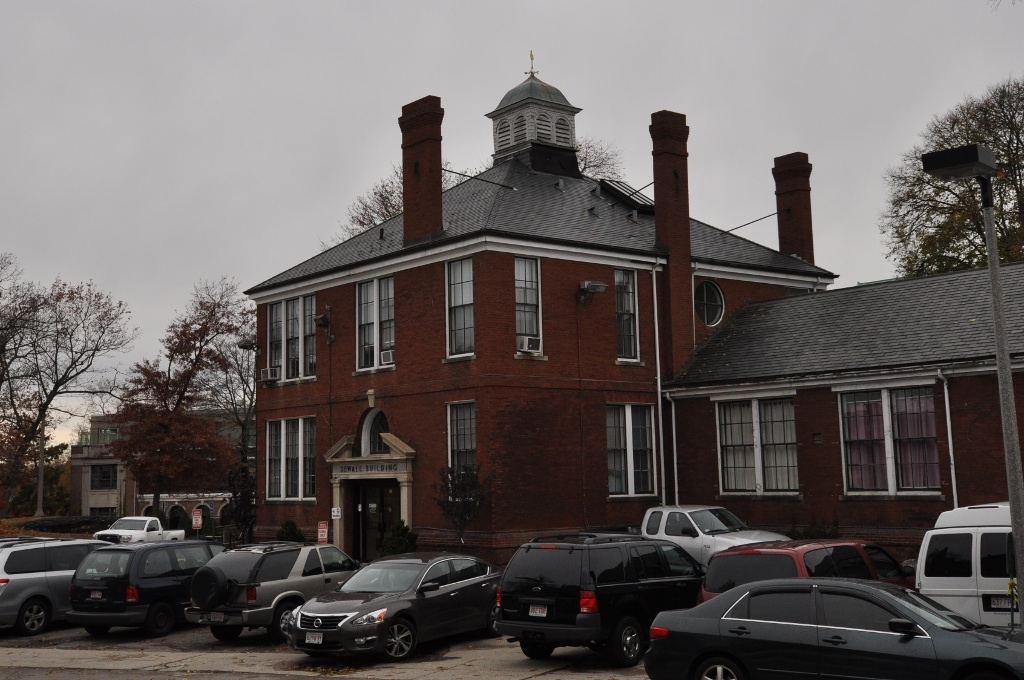
Sewall Maternity Building, New England Hospital for Women and Children, Roxbury, Boston, Massachusetts, 1892 and 1916.

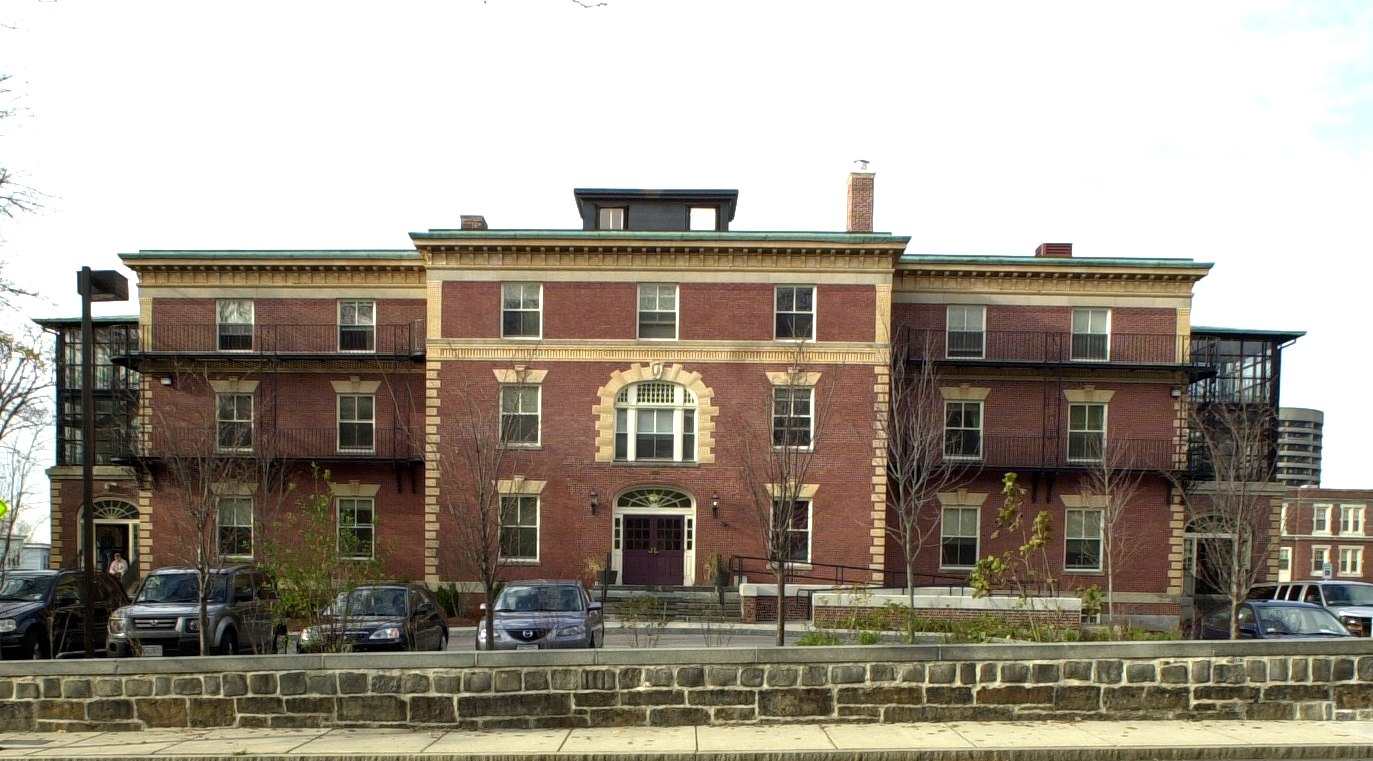
Walnut Building, Home for Aged Couples, Jamaica Plain, Boston, Massachusetts, 1892.

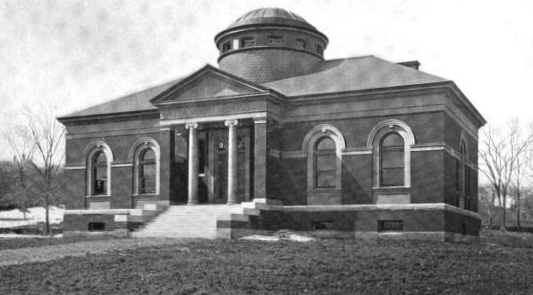
Chelmsford Public Library, Chelmsford, Massachusetts, 1894.

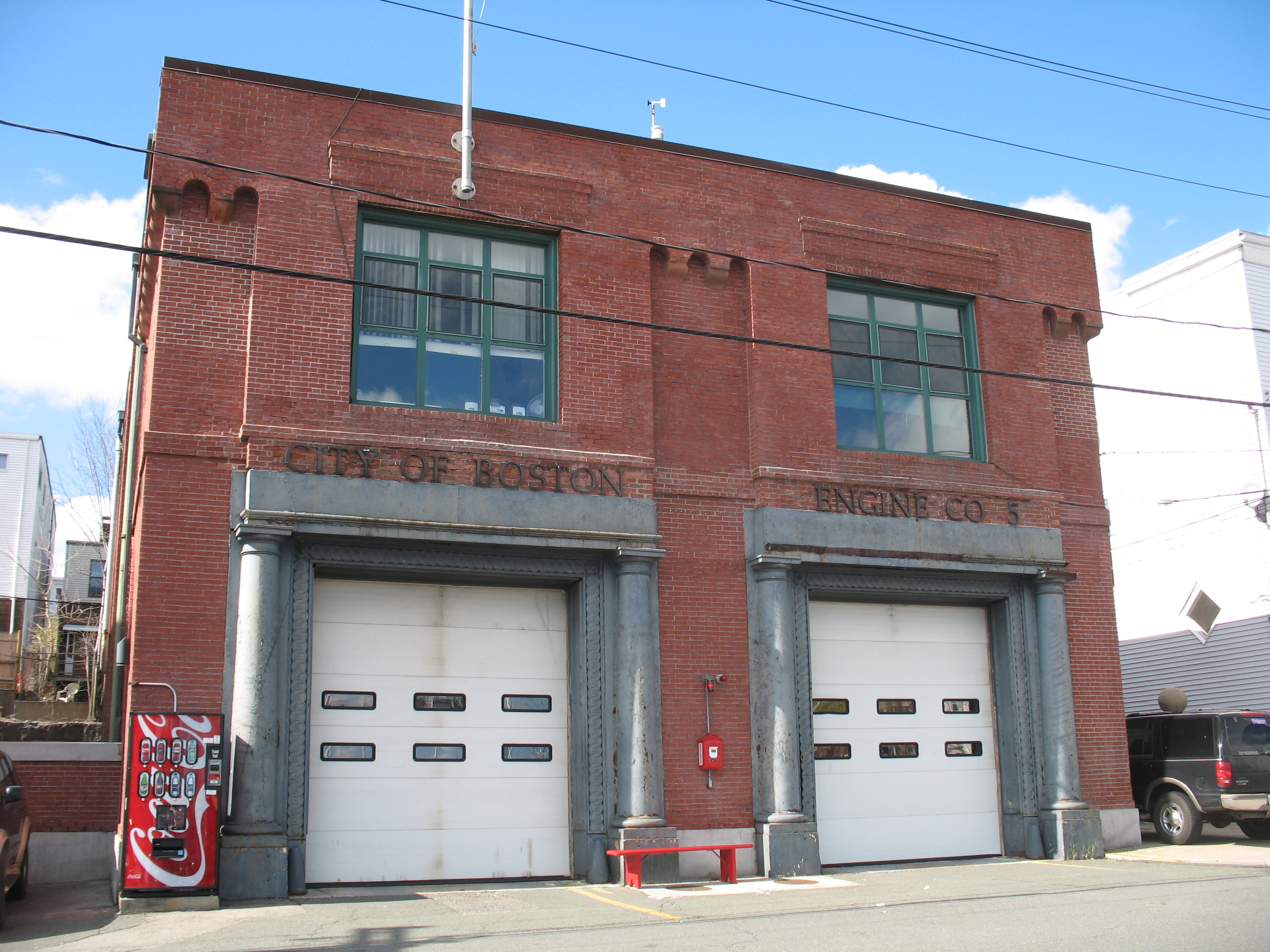
Chemical 7 Fire Station, East Boston, Boston, Massachusetts, 1901.

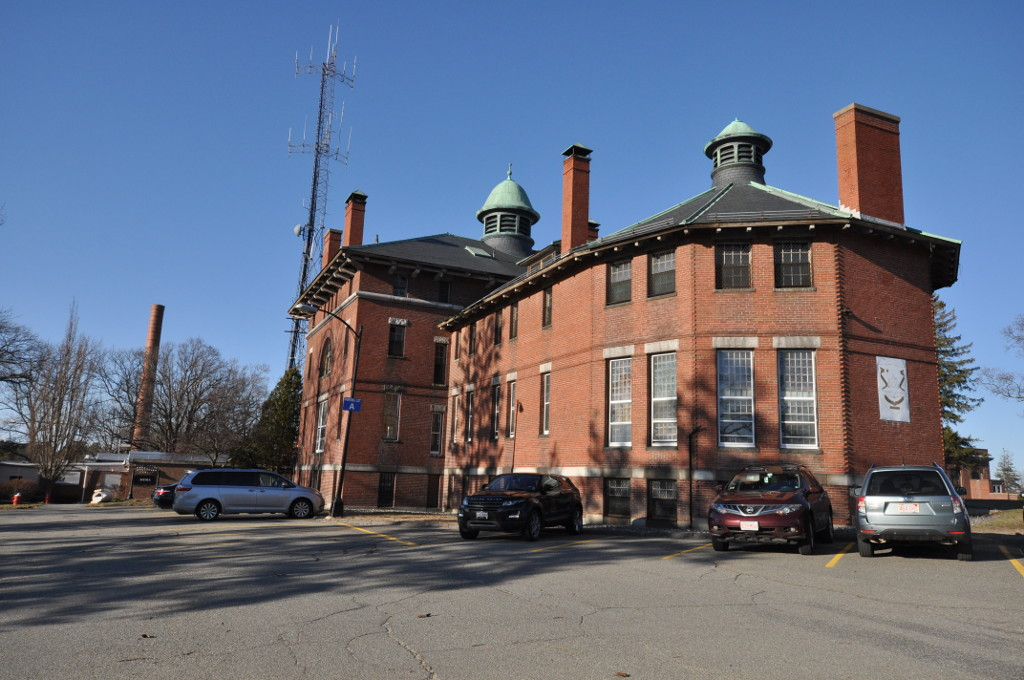
Women's Building, Tewksbury Hospital, Tewksbury, Massachusetts, 1903.

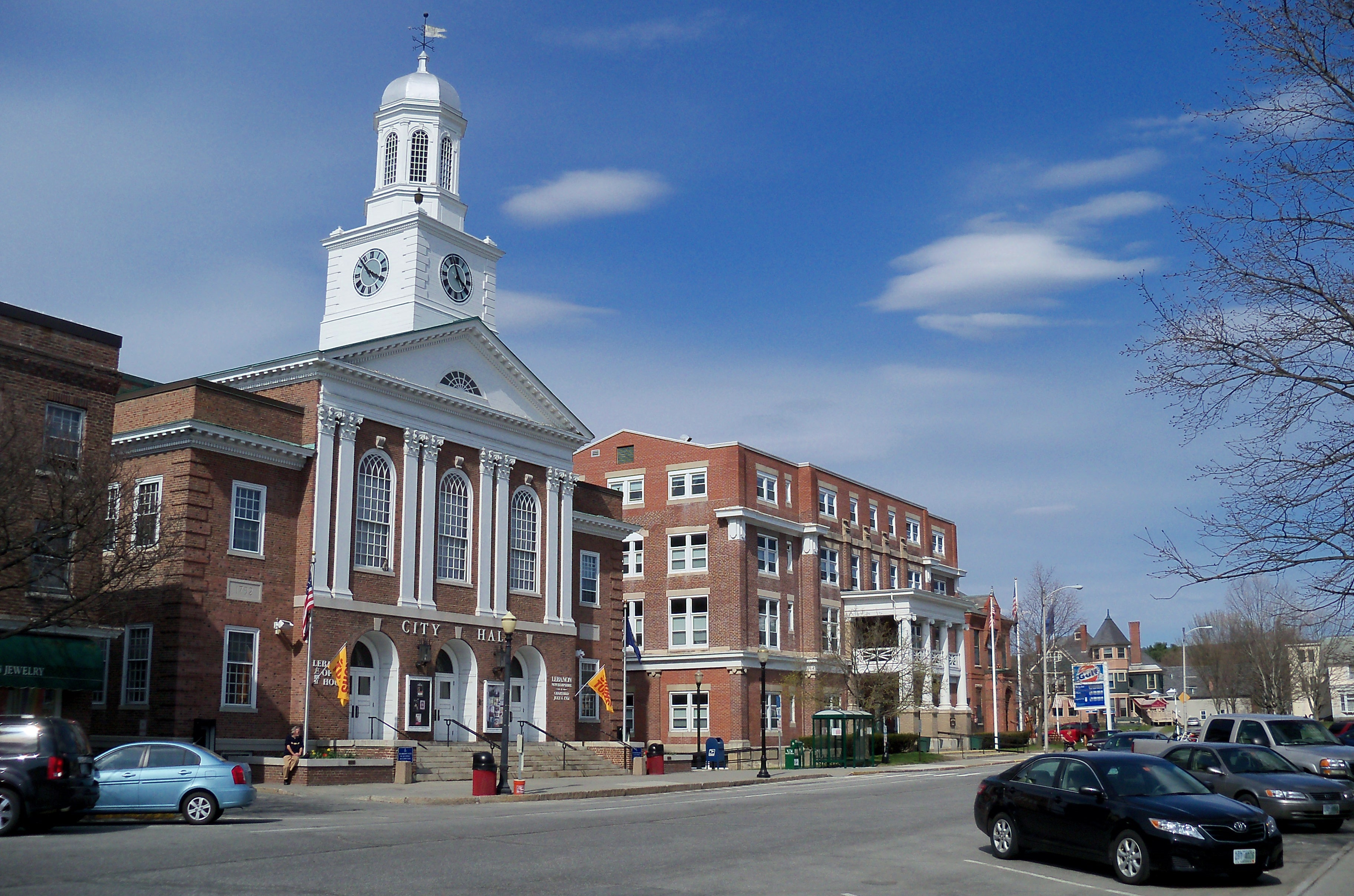
Hotel Rogers (center right), Lebanon, New Hampshire, 1911.
