= Columbus Avenue (Boston) =

Street in Boston, Massachusetts

Columbus Avenue

Major junctions
- South end: Walnut Avenue in Roxbury
- North end: Park Plaza in Beacon Hill

Location
- Country: United States
- State: Massachusetts

Highway system
- Massachusetts State Highway System; Interstate; US; State

Columbus Avenue in Boston, Massachusetts, runs from Park Square to just south of Melnea Cass Boulevard, as well as from Tremont Street to Walnut Avenue and Seaver Street, where it continues as Seaver Street to Blue Hill Avenue and to Erie Street, where it ends. It intersects the South End and Roxbury neighborhoods.

== Buildings and tenants ==
- African Methodist Episcopal Zion Church
- Armory of the First Corps of Cadets
- Doris Bunte Apartments
- Charlie's Sandwich Shoppe
- Home for Aged Couples
- Northeastern University
- Roxbury Community College
- Youth's Companion Building

Former

- Allan Crite
- Boston Flower Exchange
- Hotel Statler, Columbus Avenue and Arlington Street
- Massachusetts Metaphysical College
- Pope Manufacturing Company, 1890s
- Savoy Cafe
- South End Grounds
- Temple Israel
- Vega Company
- Waitt & Bond Factory (Later owned by Alles & Fisher, now part of Northeastern University)

== Images ==
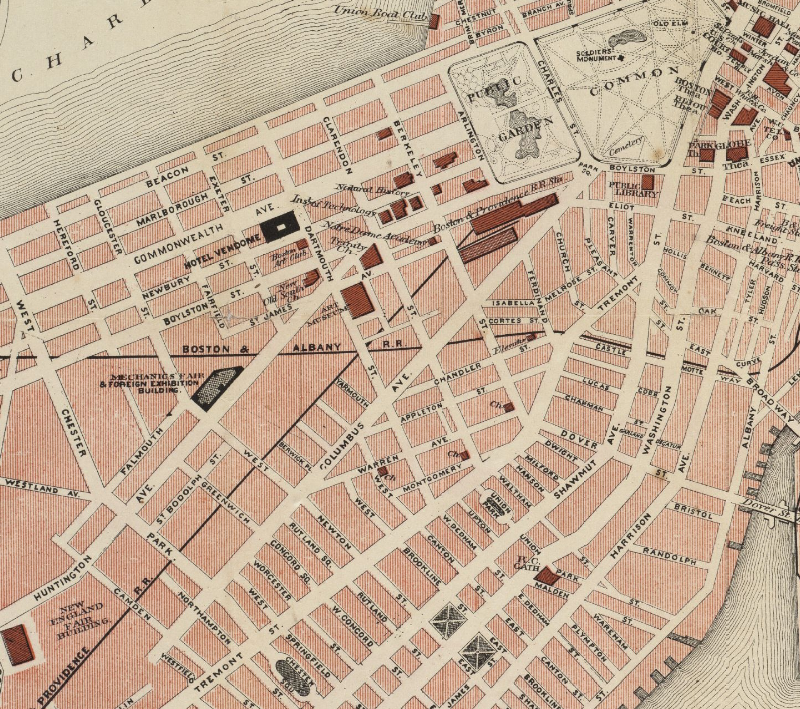
Map of Columbus Ave. and vicinity, 1883

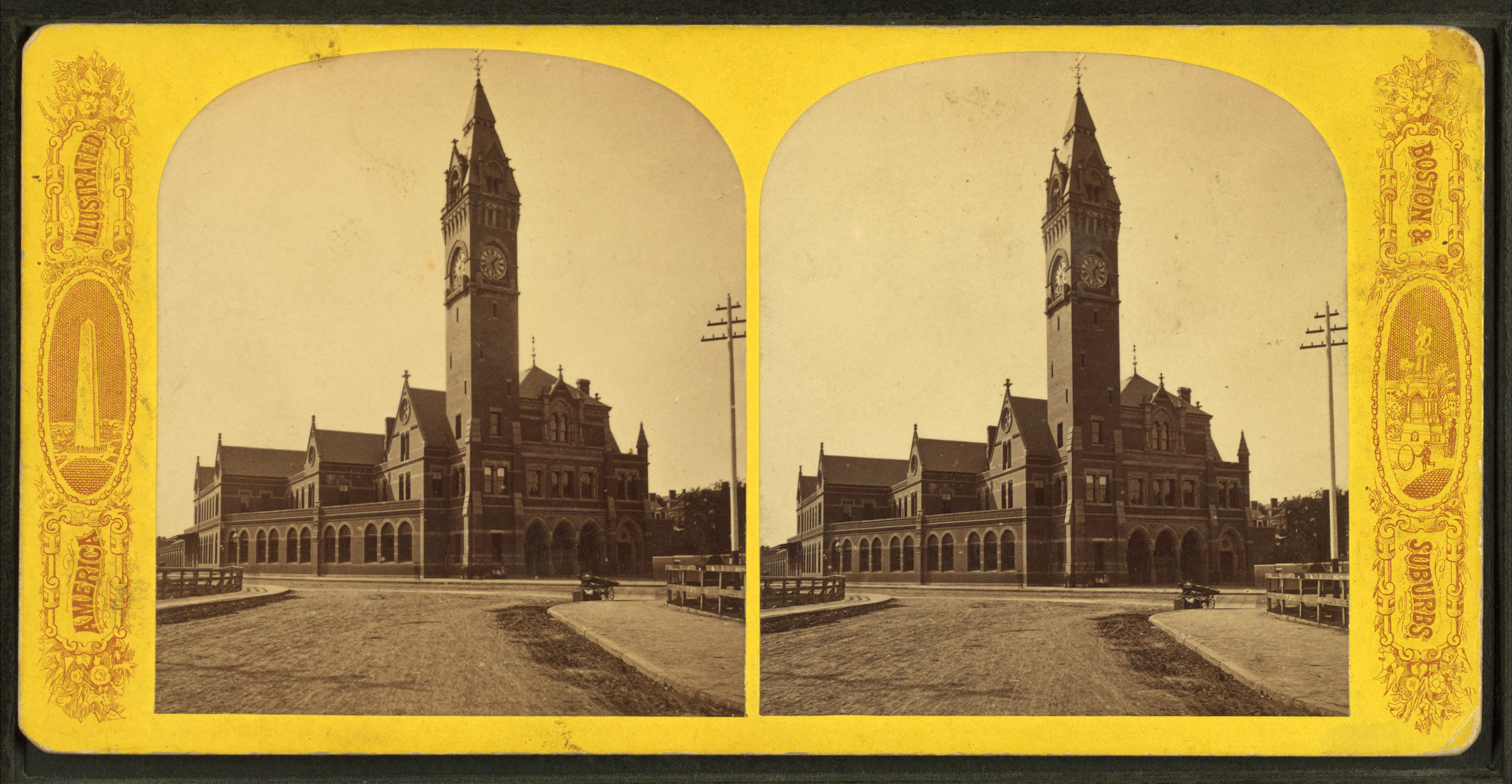
Boston and Providence R.R. Station, Park Square, late 19th century

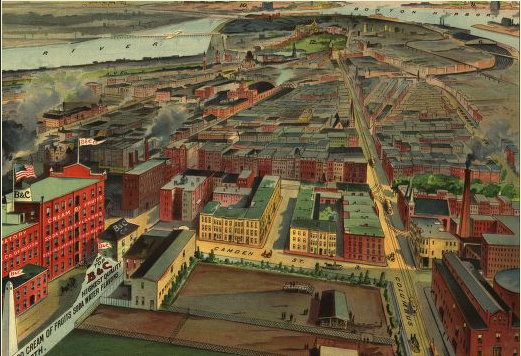
Bird's-eye view of Columbus Ave. and vicinity, 1902

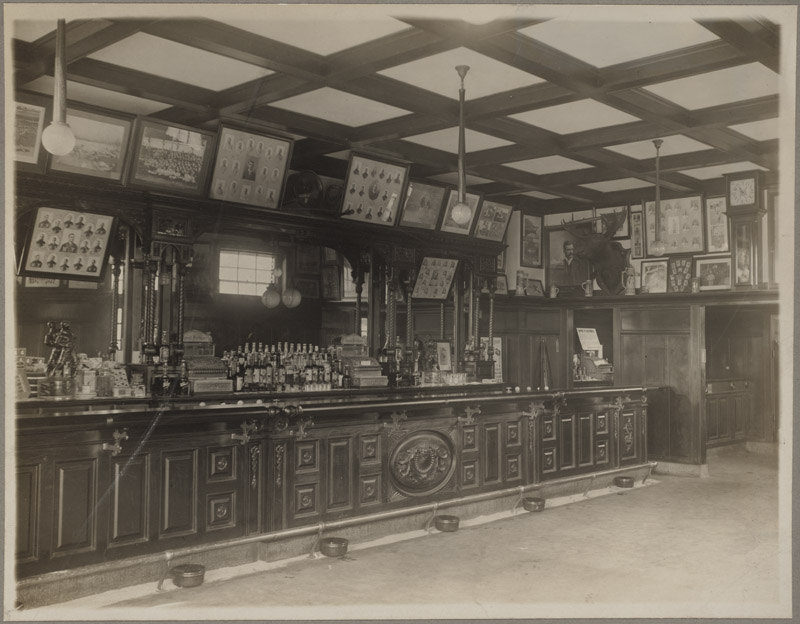
McGreevey's Third Base Saloon, no.940 Columbus Avenue, Roxbury Crossing, 1914 (Boston Public Library)

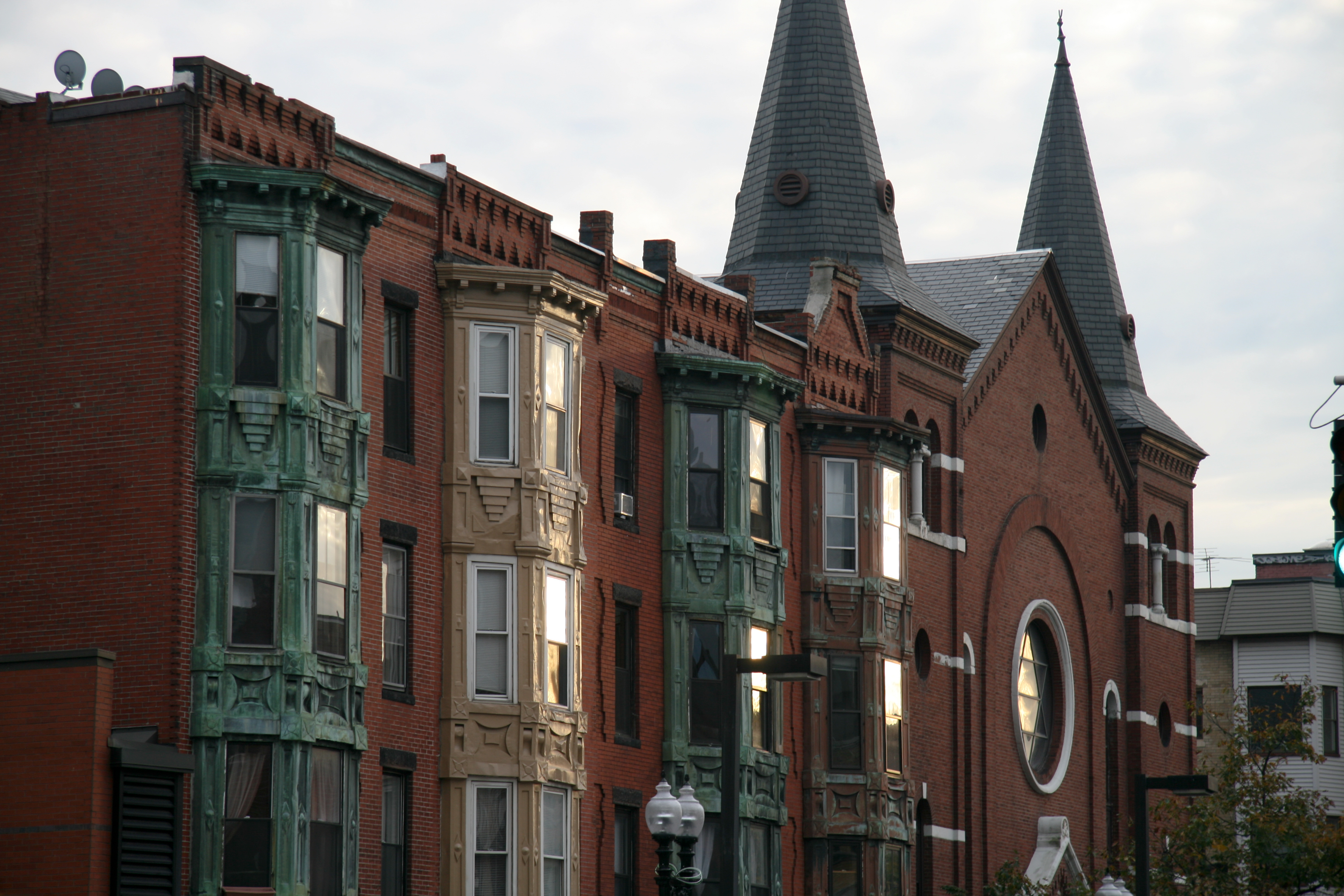
Columbus Avenue, 2009

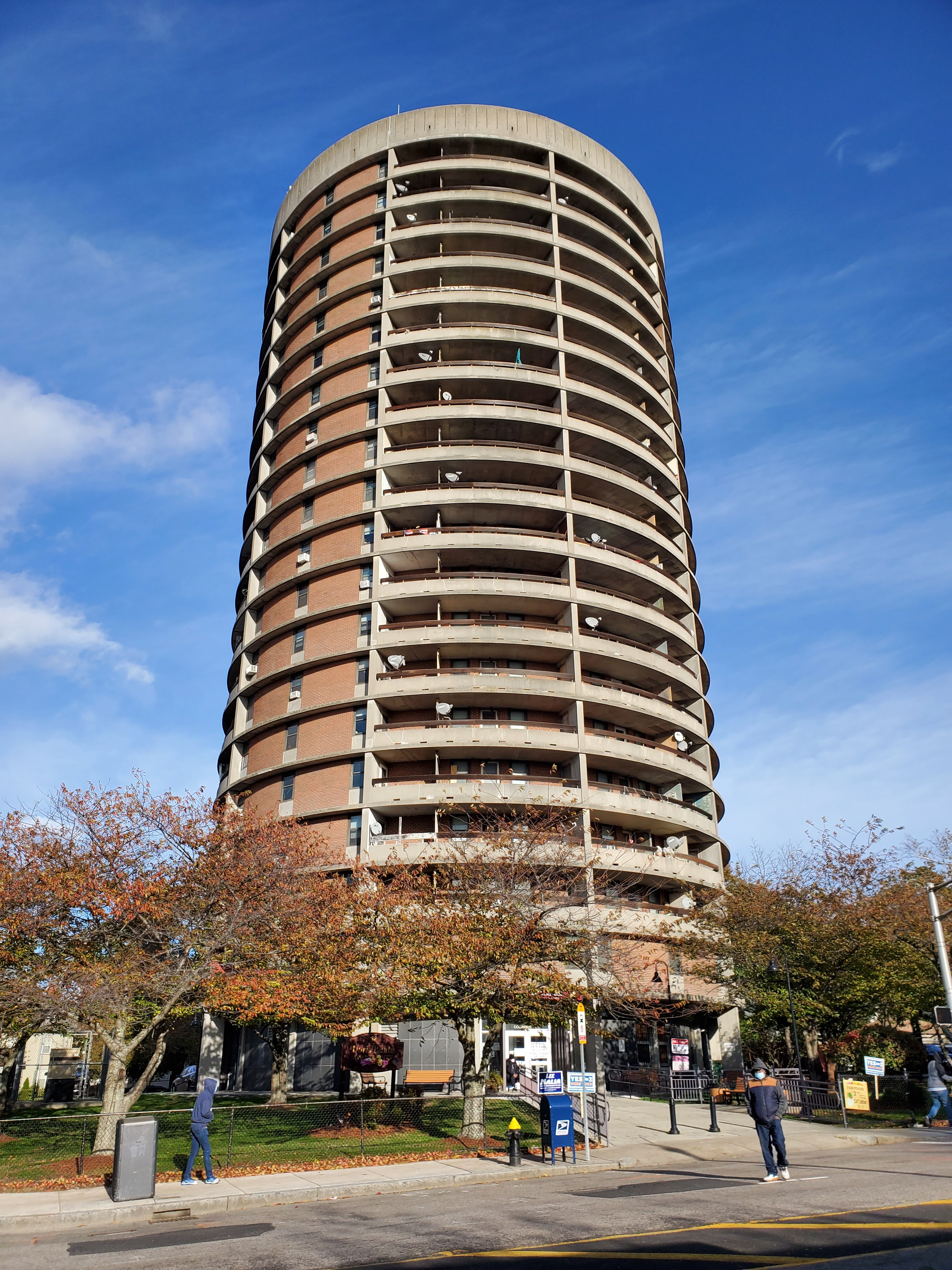
Doris Bunte Apartments, 2020

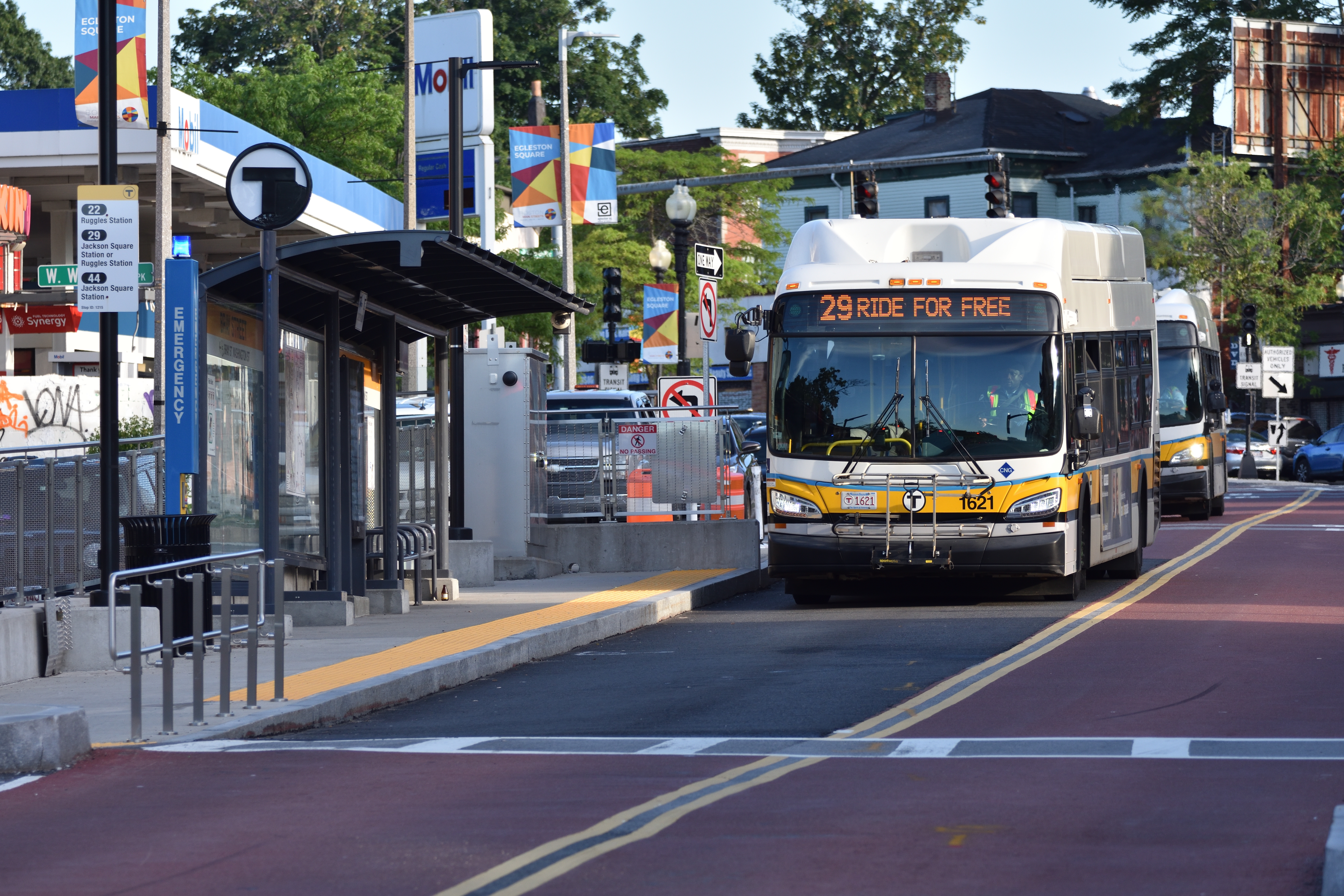
An MBTA 29 bus at the Bray St stop, on the center-running bus lane
