= The Public Health Museum in Massachusetts =

Museum in Tewkesbury, Massachusetts, USA

Coordinates: 42.6109°N 71.2196°W

The Public Health Museum in Massachusetts is a museum in Tewksbury, Massachusetts in the United States. It opened on September 30, 1994, the 100th anniversary year of the Old Administration building at the historic Tewksbury Hospital, where the museum is housed.

The museum also offers a walking tour of the Tewksbury Hospital campus exploring its history, its architecture, the lives of its patients and staff, and its connection to public health.
