= Henry Stewart House =

Historic house in Massachusetts, United States

- U.S. National Register of Historic Places
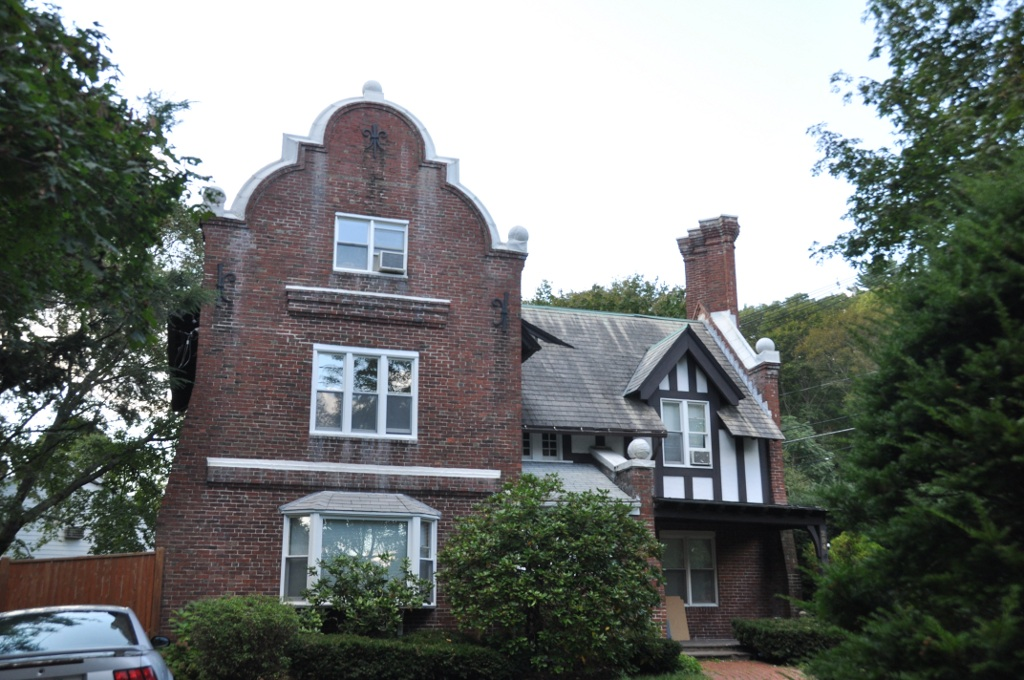

- Location within Massachusetts Location within the United States
- Location: 294 Linden St., Waltham, Massachusetts
- Coordinates: 42°23′5″N 71°13′2″W
- Built: c.1900–01
- Architect: John A. Fox
- Architectural style: Tudor Revival, Jacobethan Revival
- MPS: Waltham MRA
- NRHP reference No.: 89001553
- Added to NRHP: September 28, 1989

The Henry Stewart House is a historic house at 294 Linden Street in Waltham, Massachusetts. The 2 1/2-story brick building was built c.1900–01, and is a rare local example of Jacobethan style. The house was built as the gardener's cottage for Cornelia Warren's Cedar Hill estate. The house was designed by Boston architect John A. Fox. Fox based his design on that of Nun Upton, a 17th-century English country house in Herefordshire near Brimfield which is now a Grade II listed building.

The house has a T-shaped plan, with projecting end gables that project upward in curved Flemish styling. The second level above the main entrance is half-timbered wood construction. The walls have highlighting heavy beltcourses, and the chimneys are topped by corbelled pots.

The house was listed on the National Register of Historic Places in 1989.

== See also ==
- National Register of Historic Places listings in Waltham, Massachusetts
