= Home for Aged Couples =

- U.S. National Register of Historic Places
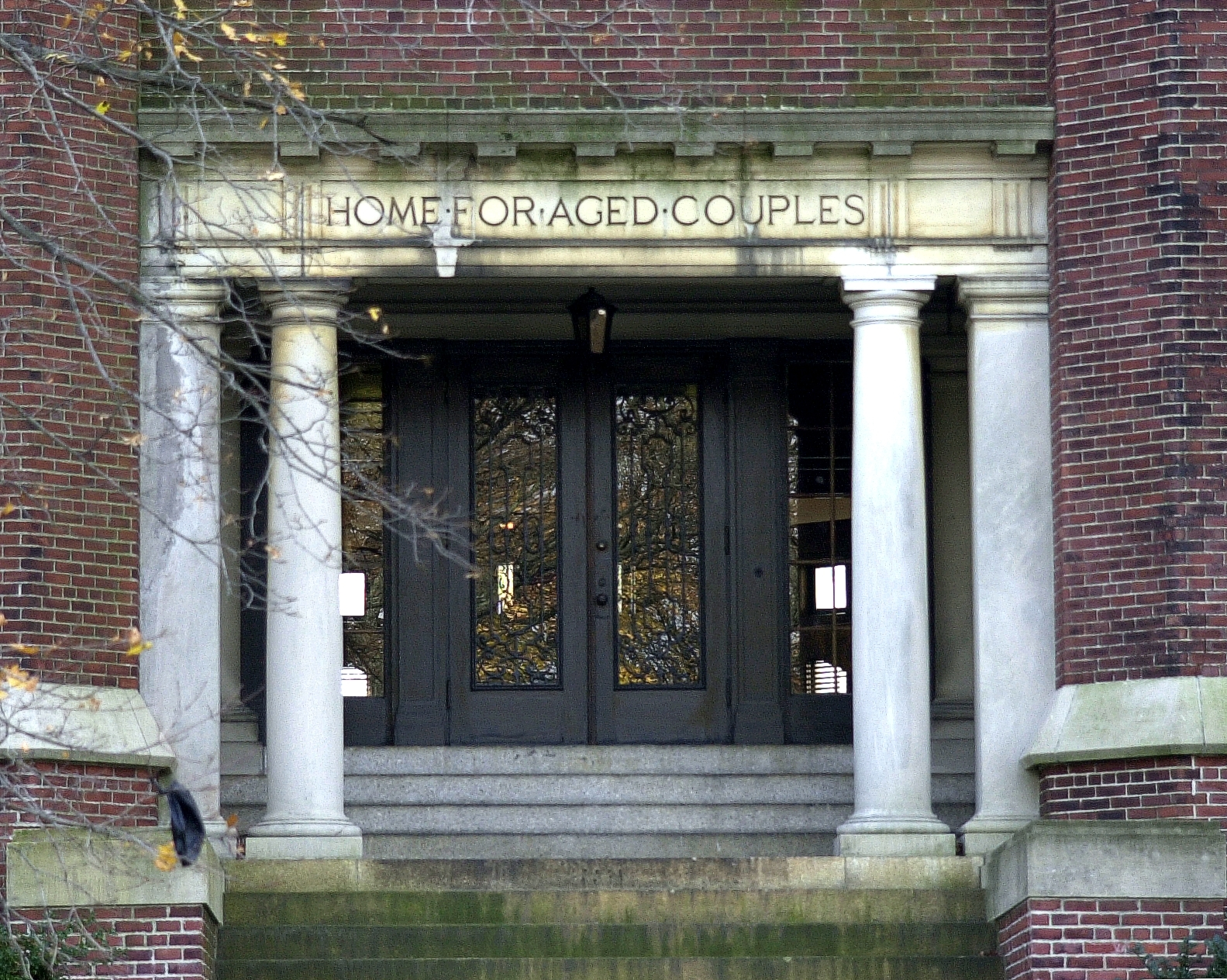
- Portico of 2055 Columbus Avenue

- Location within Massachusetts Location within the United States
- Location: 409, 419 Walnut Ave. and 2055 Columbus Ave. Boston, Massachusetts
- Coordinates: 42°18′49.1″N 71°5′45.5″W
- Area: 2.9 acres (1.2 ha)
- Architect: John A. Fox; Coolidge, Shepley, Bulfinch and Abbott
- Architectural style: Classical Revival, Exotic Revival, et al.
- NRHP reference No.: 05000879
- Added to NRHP: August 11, 2005

The Home for Aged Couples is a group of three historic buildings at 409 and 419 Walnut Ave. and 2055 Columbus Avenue in the Jamaica Plain neighborhood of Boston, Massachusetts. The building at 409 Walnut Avenue has been boarded up and is partially demolished.

The Classical Revival buildings were designed by John A. Fox and Coolidge, Shepley, Bulfinch and Abbott and constructed between 1892 and 1927. Around the time of the construction of the Badger Building in 1927, brick connectors were constructed between all three buildings; these have since been demolished. The buildings were added to the National Register of Historic Places in 2005. Since 1999 Rogerson Communities (founded in 1860 as the Home for Aged Men) has taken the lead in fundraising to redevelop the property.

== Gallery ==
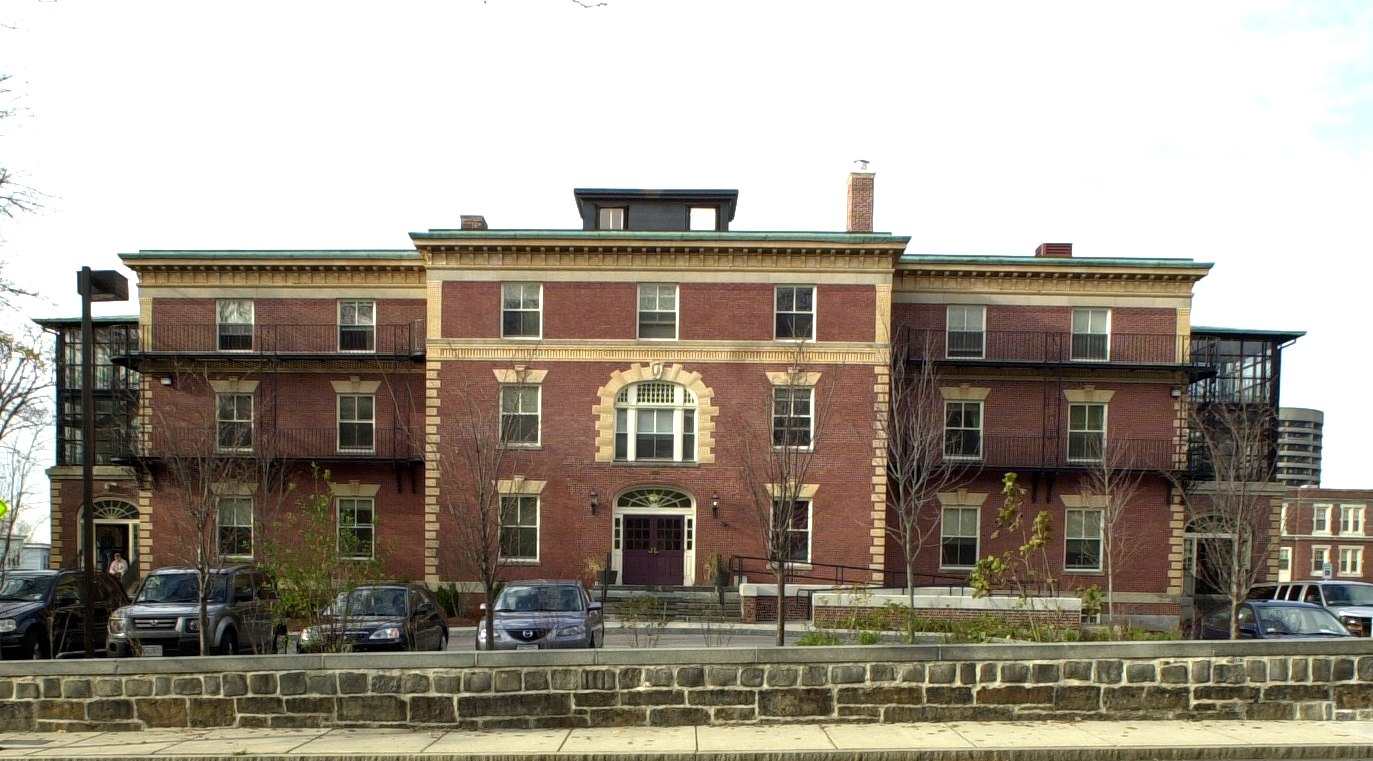

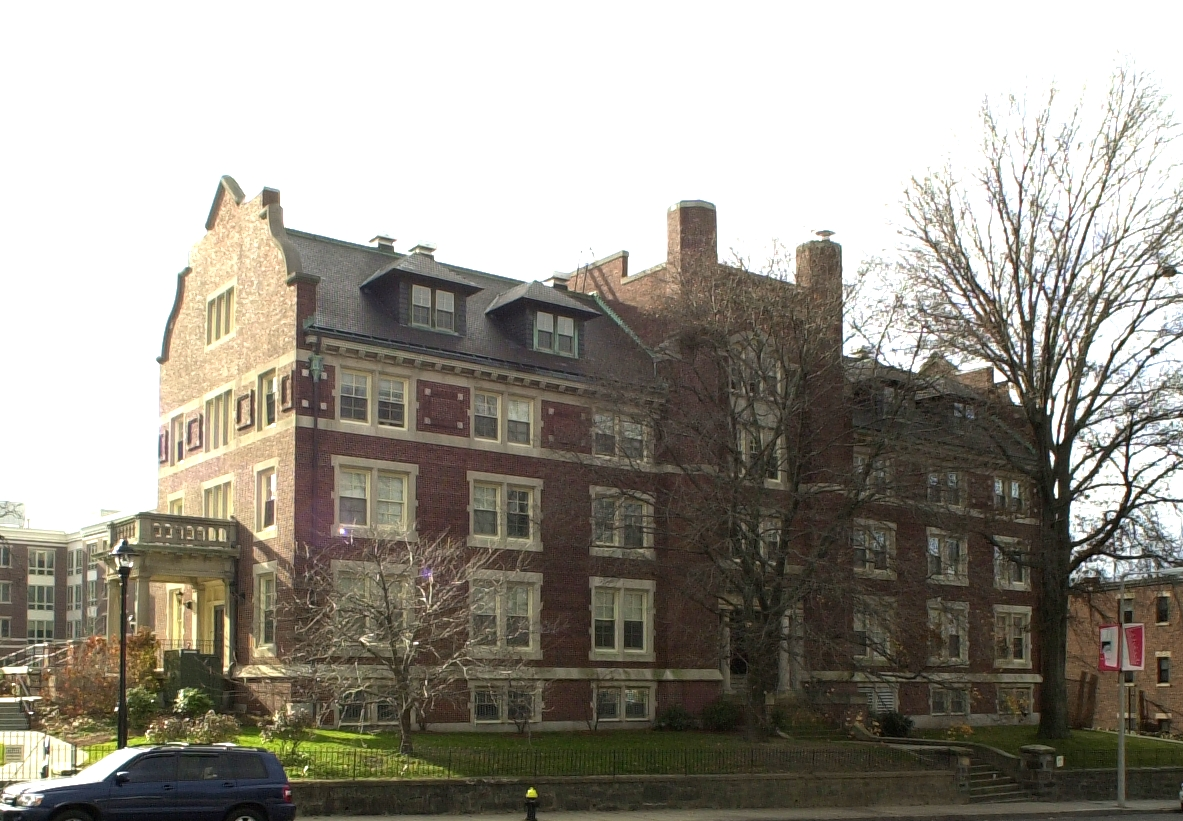

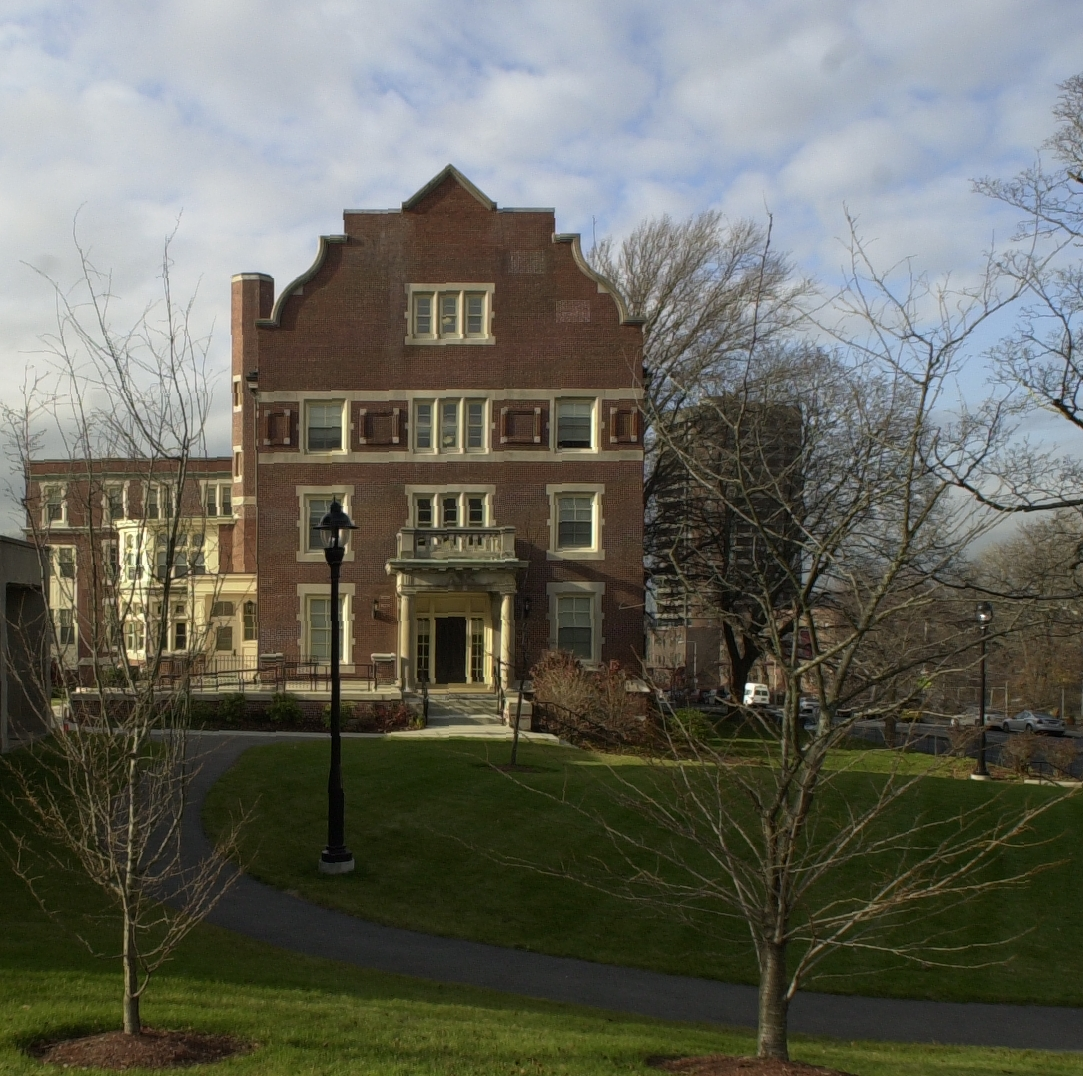

== See also ==
- National Register of Historic Places listings in southern Boston, Massachusetts
