= Tewksbury Hospital =

State hospital in Massachusetts, United States

- Massachusetts Department of Public Health

Geography
- Location: Tewksbury, Massachusetts, United States
- Coordinates: 42°36′29.5986″N 71°13′3.4608″W

Services
- Standards: Joint Commission
- Emergency department: No
- Beds: 370

History
- Former name: Tewksbury Almshouse
- Opened: 1854

Links
- Website: www.mass.gov/locations/tewksbury-hospital
- Lists: Hospitals in Massachusetts
- Tewksbury State Hospital
- U.S. National Register of Historic Places
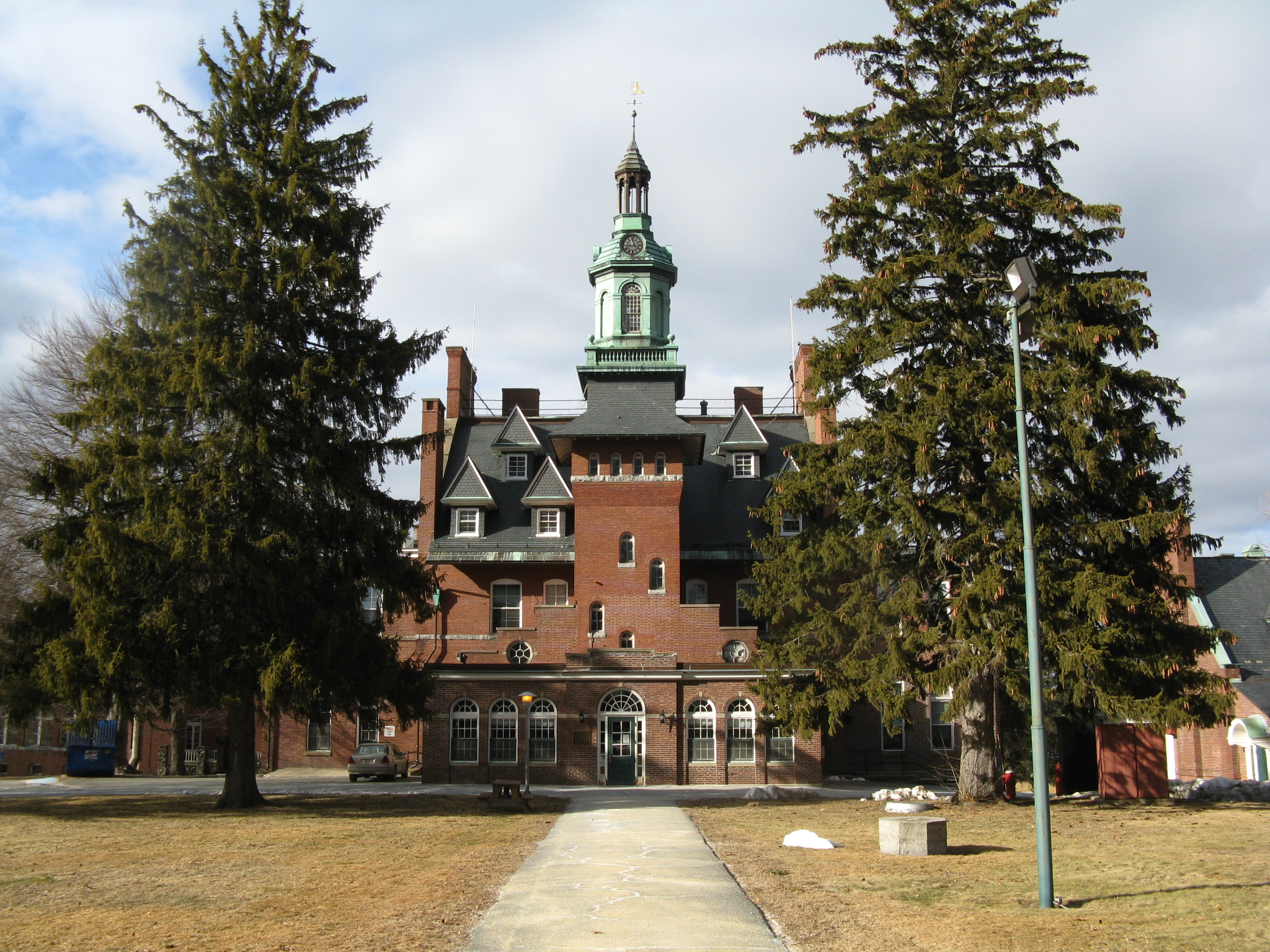
- Old Administration Building

- Location within Massachusetts Location within the United States
- Location: Tewksbury, Massachusetts
- Built: 1854
- MPS: Massachusetts State Hospitals And State Schools MPS
- NRHP reference No.: 93001486
- Added to NRHP: January 21, 1994

Tewksbury Hospital is a National Register of Historic Places-listed state hospital located on an 800+-acre campus in Tewksbury, Massachusetts. The centerpiece of the hospital campus is the 1894 Richard Morris Building ("Old Administration Building").

The Massachusetts Department of Public Health currently operates a Joint Commission accredited, 370-bed facility at Tewksbury Hospital, providing both medical and psychiatric services to challenging adult patients with chronic conditions. The Public Health Museum in Massachusetts now occupies the Richard Morris Building. In addition to the hospital and museum, the Tewksbury Hospital campus also hosts eight residential substance abuse programs, serving up to 275 patients. Five Massachusetts state agencies also have regional offices at Tewksbury, including the Massachusetts Department of Mental Health and the Massachusetts Department of Public Safety. The campus also hosts several non-profit and for-profit private entities, including the Lahey Health Behavioral Services' Tewksbury Treatment Center, Casa Esperanza's Conexiones Clinical Stabilization Services (CSS), the Lowell House's Sheehan Women's Program, the Lowell House Recovery Home, the Middlesex Human Service Agency, and the Strongwater Farm Therapeutic Equestrian Center.

== History ==
=== Almshouse ===
Authorized by an act of Massachusetts General Court in 1852, Tewksbury Hospital was originally established as a Tewksbury Almshouse (along with similar facilities in Monson and Bridgewater), opening in May 1854, under its first superintendent, Isaac H. Meserve. The original Tewksbury campus consisted of "large wooden buildings" which were considered "badly designed, poorly constructed firetraps." Upon opening, paupers from across the state were sent to Tewksbury and its two companion facilities, rapidly overwhelming the facilities. Within three weeks, Tewksbury had a population of over 800, well over its intended capacity of 500. By the end of 1854, a total of 2,193 people had been admitted.

By the mid-1860s formal record-keeping had begun at Tewksbury, a series of intake records known as "inmate biographies". Based on these documents, historian and sociologist David Wagner estimates that one-third of the original population were children, and of the remaining adult population, 64% were male. The overwhelming majority of inmates were immigrants, mostly from Ireland. Tewksbury's demographics changed over time, with the number of children declining to only 10% by 1890.

The Salem and Lowell Railroad had a passenger station on its main line for the State Almshouse in Tewksbury. The Almshouse had its own spur line to a freight house, and coaling station to the power plant- both of which still exist today.

=== Almshouse to hospital ===
In 1866, a hospital was added to supplement the existing almshouse. In that same year, Tewksbury first began accepting what were known as the "pauper insane". In 1879, Tewksbury was reorganized, and its population separated according to type of illness: 40% of the beds were given over to the mentally ill; 33% to almshouse inmates, and 27% to hospital patients. By the end of the 1880s, Tewksbury had become solely a hospital, serving a combination of mentally and physically ill. And by the 1890s, the original 1854 wooden almshouse building had been torn down, and the remaining almshouse buildings were repurposed for hospital use. Some of these would remain standing until the 1970s.

==== Anne Sullivan ====
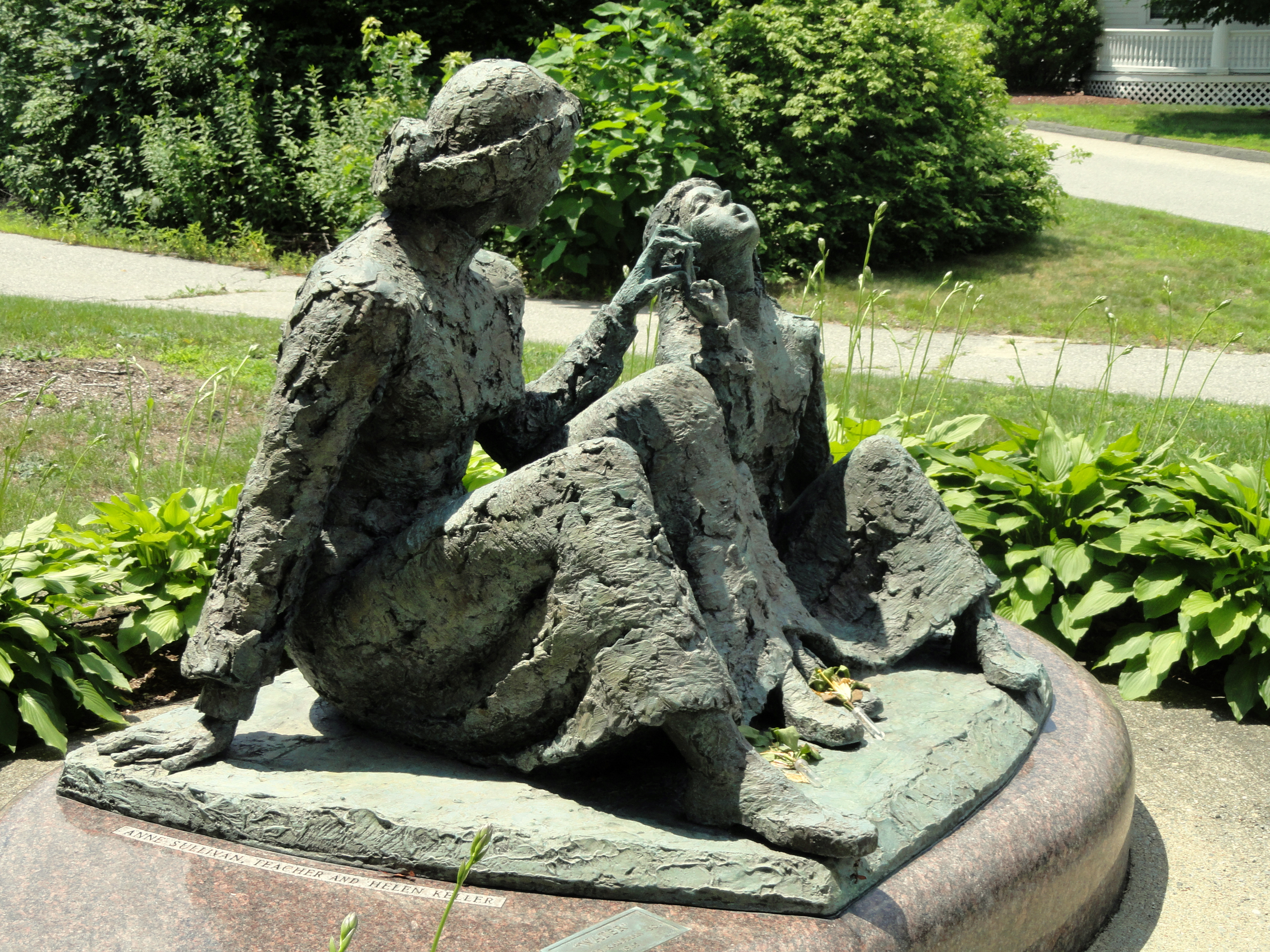
Anne Sullivan statue at Tewksbury Town Common

From February 1876 to October 1880, Tewksbury housed its most famous inmate, Anne Sullivan, best known as the teacher and companion of Helen Keller. Her mother dead, and abandoned by her father, Sullivan was admitted to Tewksbury at the age of ten, along with her younger brother Jimmie. Sullivan was afflicted with trachoma, which was beginning to blind her; her brother was suffering from tuberculosis, which was to cause his death four months later. Sullivan later recalled her time at Tewksbury:

Very much of what I remember about Tewksbury is indecent, cruel, melancholy, gruesome in the light of grown-up experience; but nothing corresponding with my present understanding of these ideas entered my child mind. Everything interested me. I was not shocked, pained, grieved or troubled by what happened. Such things happened. People behaved like that—that was all that there was to it. It was all the life I knew. Things impressed themselves upon me because I had a receptive mind. Curiosity kept me alert and keen to know everything.

In October 1880, Sullivan left Tewksbury, allowed by the intervention of a state official to transfer to the Perkins School for the Blind in Boston. A building at Tewksbury (the old Male Asylum building) is now named for her.

==== The Butler committee ====
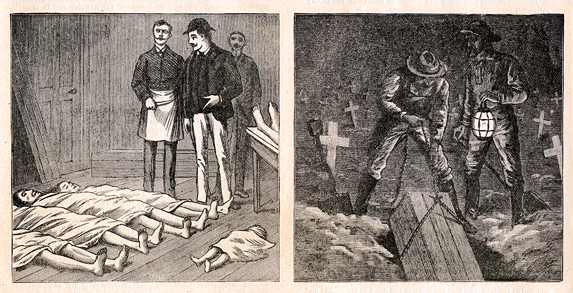
A grisly trade alleged at Tewksbury.

In 1883, Massachusetts Governor Benjamin F. Butler made headlines when he accused Tewksbury management and staff of a variety of abuses ranging from the venal, "financial malfeasance, nepotism, patient abuse, and theft of inmate clothing and monies," to the macabre, including, "trading in bodies of dead paupers and transporting them for a profit to medical schools," and "tanning human flesh to convert to shoes or other objects [...] from Tewksbury paupers." The General Court (state legislature) organized a committee to investigate Tewksbury. Political factions, and newspapers aligned with them, seized upon the story, either highlighting the most lurid parts of the testimony, or denouncing Butler as a liar using false allegations for political gain.

Ultimately, the General Court rejected most of Butler's charges, but the publicity of the investigation led to new management and major changes at Tewksbury, including the departure of Thomas J. Marsh, superintendent of Tewksbury for the previous twenty-five years. Marsh was succeeded by C. Irving Fisher in June 1883.

Butler later wrote in his memoirs that the "investigation was productive of great good because it called the attention of the whole people of the country in the several States to the condition of things in institutions, and investigations of like character into their affairs in the succeeding year were quite general and caused great reforms."

==== Construction and expansion ====
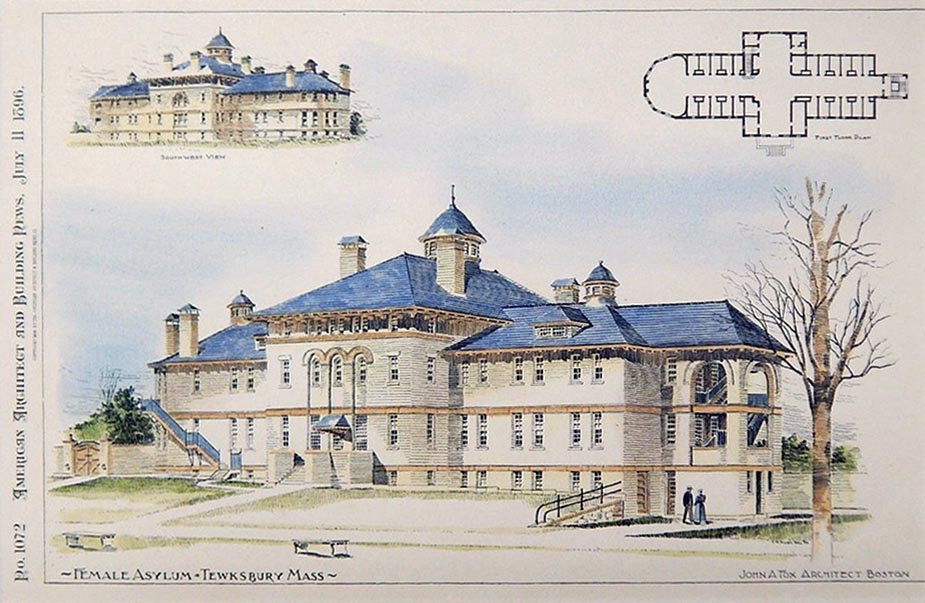
Female Asylum, Tewksbury, Architectural Drawing by John A. Fox, 1896

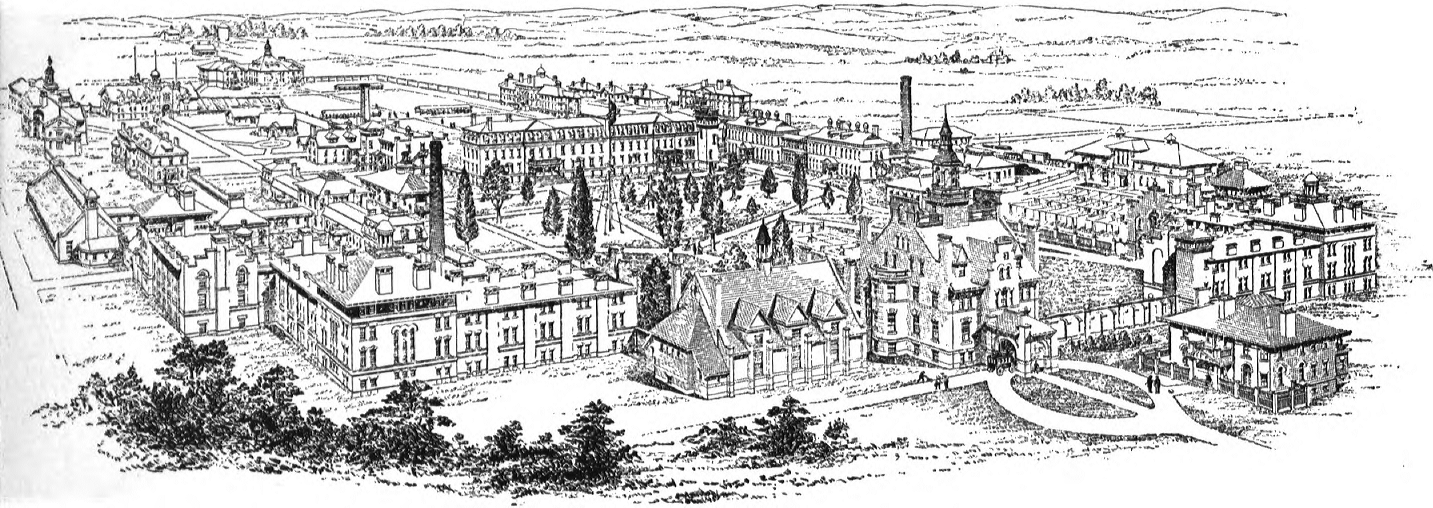
Tewksbury State Hospital in 1907

From 1894 to 1905, the Tewksbury campus saw extensive new construction, including several buildings designed by Boston architect John A. Fox—the Old Administration Building (1894), the Male Asylum (1901), the Women's Asylum (1903). During that period, the Old Superintendent's House (1894), the chapel (1896), the Main Gate (1900), the Southgate Men's Building (1905), and Male Officers Dormitory (1905) were also added to Tewksbury, along with several farm and support buildings. Two other hospital buildings at Tewksbury were designed by the Boston firm of Hartwell and Richardson.

The architectural history and quality of the Tewksbury campus was a key criterion for its inclusion on the National Register of Historic Places. The Massachusetts Historical Commission describes the Tewksbury's historic buildings as "designed in a variety of popular period styles such as Queen Anne, Romanesque Revival, Craftsman, Colonial Revival, and Classical Revival" and "generally unified by two-to-four story height, similar moderate scale, fieldstone foundations and redbrick walls, and overhanging slate hip or gable roofs with exposed rafters".

=== Hospital ===
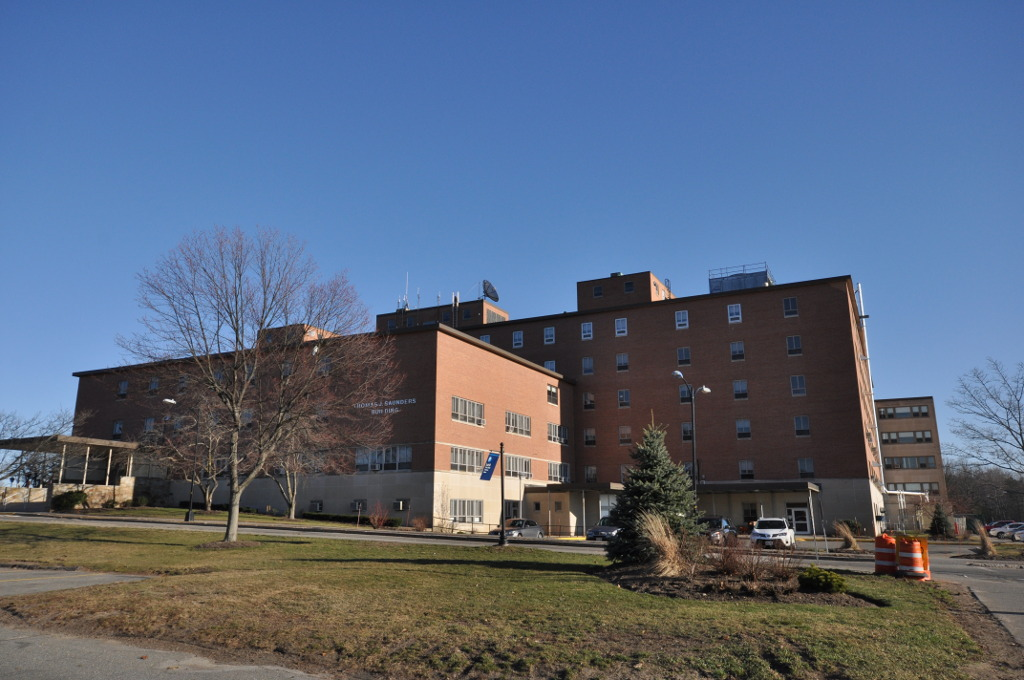
The Saunders Building houses the hospital's modern facilities.

Reflecting its changing mission, the Massachusetts General Court renamed Tewksbury Almshouse to Tewksbury State Hospital in 1900. Tewksbury was to be renamed three times over the next century: to Tewksbury State Infirmary in 1909, to Tewksbury State Hospital and Infirmary in 1939, and finally to Tewksbury Hospital in 1959, the name it still bears. In the first part of the 20th century, Tewksbury combined two roles, first, as a "last resort" facility for the elderly and the mentally ill, and secondly, as an isolation and care center for patients with infectious diseases, such as Smallpox, Typhoid Fever, and Tuberculosis.

==== Nursing School ====
A Home Training School for Nurses opened at Tewksbury in 1894, under the direction of Clara B. Stevens, the first Superintendent of Nurses and Principal of the Training School. Four years later it was expanded to a complete three-year training program. Because of the variety of physical and mental conditions treated at Tewksbury, it was considered an ideal place for education of nurses. Author and reformer, Franklin Benjamin Sanborn, observed at the 1902 National Conference of Charities and Correction:

[Tewksbury] has been obliged to receive all kinds for the thirty-eight years that I have known it, has received every disease which ever appeared in Massachusetts, not excepting leprosy; for we have had several cases of leprosy there. If you will consider what that signifies to the medical profession and the training of nurses, you will see how important it is that their training should go on where no disease is excluded.

In 1921, a School of Practical Nursing was added at Tewksbury, and trained nurses until its closure in 1997 for financial reasons. Tewksbury Hospital's then-CEO, Raymond Sanzone said of the closure, "None of us is happy with this closing, but the school is no longer financially viable. [...] The main mission of this institution is to treat patients, not to train nurses"

==== WPA expansion ====
Tewksbury saw a second major expansion of its facilities during the 1930s under the Works Progress Administration (WPA) program. WPA-constructed buildings added during that decade included: the Married Couples Building (ca. 1930), Special Building (ca. 1930) (a dormitory building), the Dining Room/Kitchen (1934), Stonecroft (1935) (an agricultural building in the Craftsman style), and the Nichols Building (1939). Along with new buildings, came murals painted by artists employed by the Federal Art Project. These murals decorate the central room of the Old Administration Building (now known as the Mural Room), and feature work by artists Maurice Compris, Samuel F. Hershey, and W. Lester Stevens.

==== Modernization ====
Tewksbury's pre-Civil War "Long Asylum" and several other older buildings were demolished in 1971 to make way for new construction. Buildings demolished included the remaining buildings from Tewksbury's time as an almshouse, along with two Hartwell & Richardson designed hospital wards. In January 1973, Tewksbury achieved accredited by the precursor of the Joint Commission.

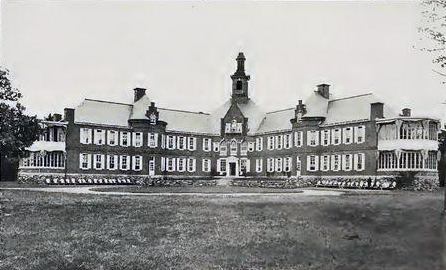
State Hospital At Tewksbury, 1908

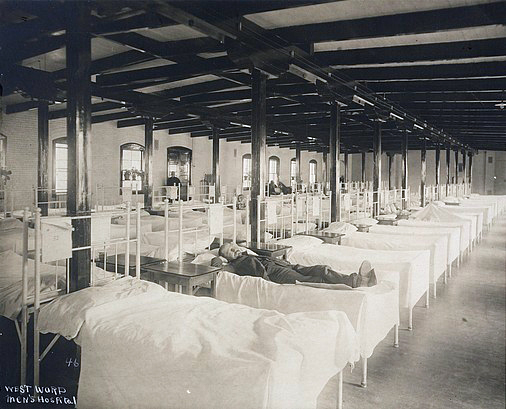
West Ward, Men's Hospital, c. 1900

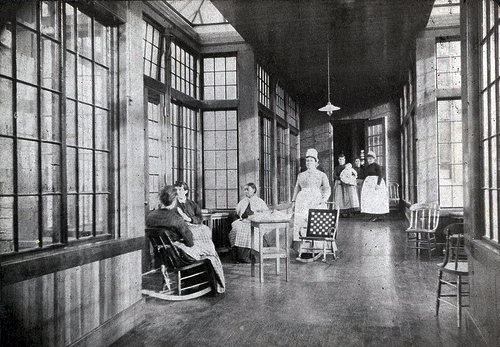
Sun Room, Female Hospital, c. 1892

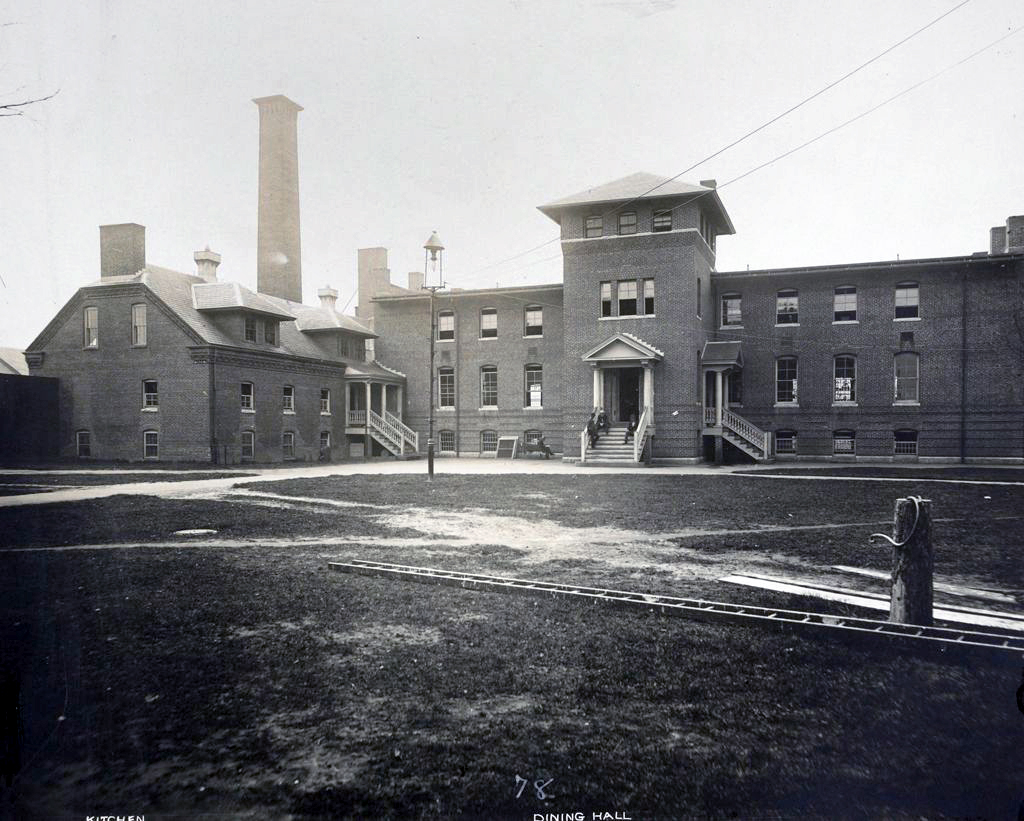
Kitchen & Dining Hall, c. 1903

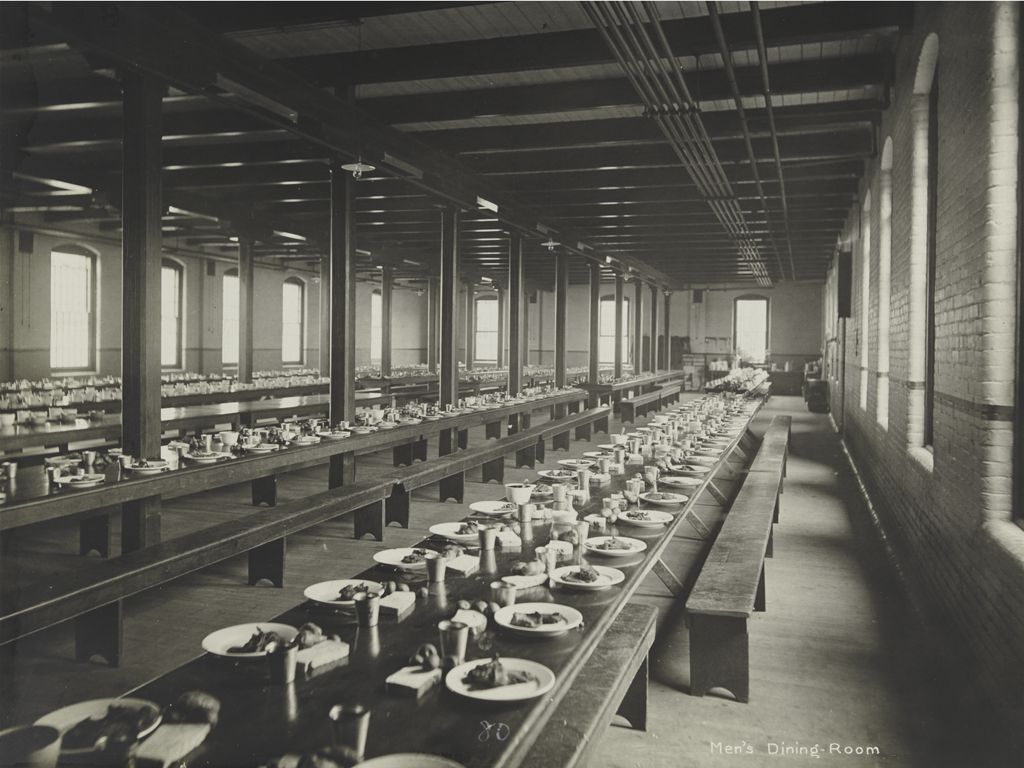
Men's Dining Hall, c. 1903

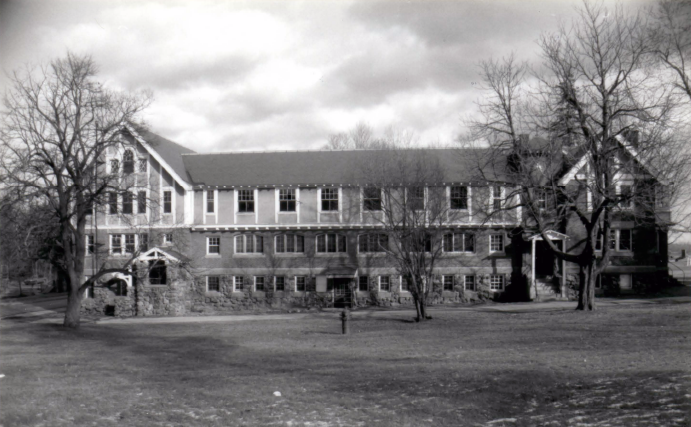
Male Employees Building

== See also ==
- National Register of Historic Places listings in Middlesex County, Massachusetts
