= The Riviera (Boston, Massachusetts) =

- U.S. National Register of Historic Places
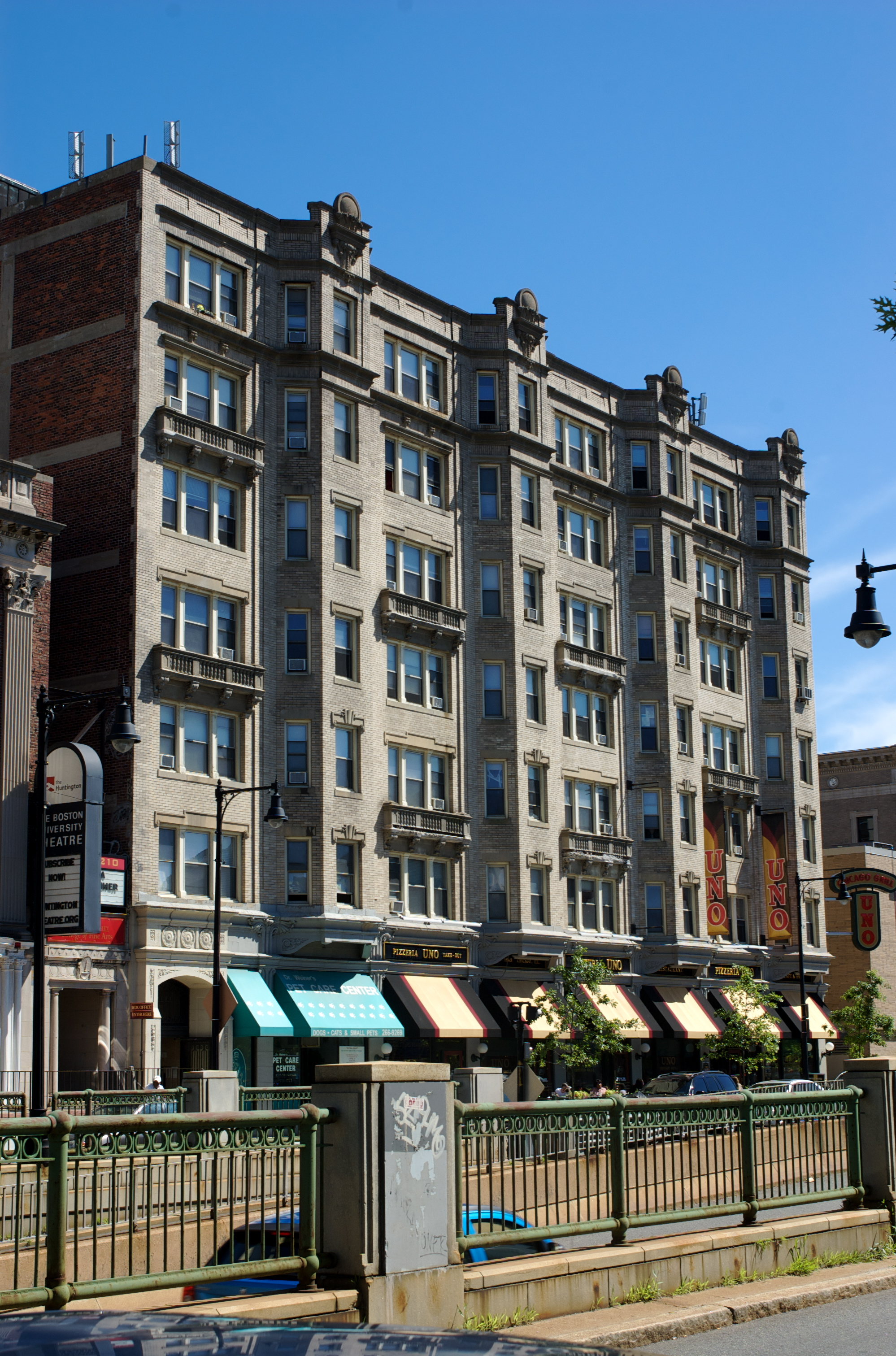

- Location within Massachusetts Location within the United States
- Location: Boston, Massachusetts
- Coordinates: 42°20′30″N 71°5′9″W
- Built: 1923
- Architect: Fred A. Norcross
- Architectural style: Classical Revival
- NRHP reference No.: 95001450
- Added to NRHP: December 7, 1995

The Riviera is an historic apartment building at 270 Huntington Avenue in Boston, Massachusetts. Built in 1923, it is a seven-story brick and concrete structure developed by Coleman & Gilbert and designed by Fred A. Norcross. Norcross was a prolific builder of apartment and tenement blocks for the city's burgeoning immigrant population. The building has an asymmetrical facade, divided into four similarly styled sections, each of which has a band of three sash windows on the left and a projecting polygonal bay on the right. A few of the three-window groups have shallow balconies with low balustrades in front of them.

The building was listed on the National Register of Historic Places in 1995.

== See also ==
- National Register of Historic Places listings in southern Boston, Massachusetts
