= Sarah Davidson Apartment Block =

Historic residential building in Boston, Massachusetts

- U.S. National Register of Historic Places
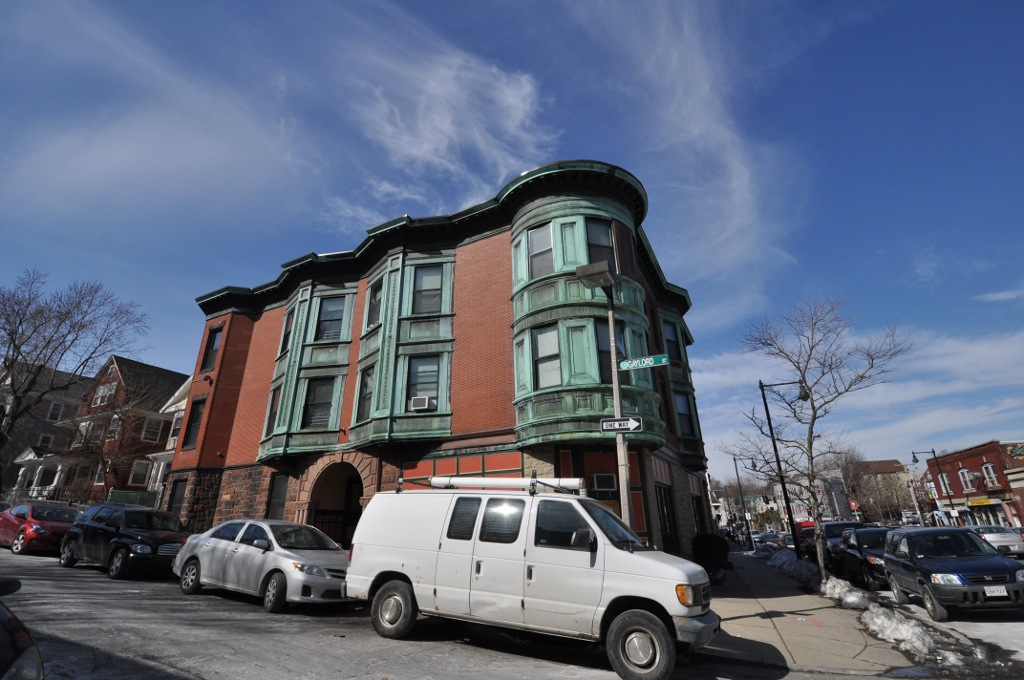

- Location within Massachusetts Location within the United States
- Location: 3 Gaylord Street, Boston, Massachusetts
- Coordinates: 42°17′56″N 71°4′23″W
- Built: 1901
- Architect: A. B. Pinkham
- Architectural style: Classical Revival
- NRHP reference No.: 13000928
- Added to NRHP: December 18, 2013

The Sarah Davidson Apartment Block is a historic commercial and multifamily residential building at 3 Gaylord Street in the Dorchester neighborhood of Boston, Massachusetts. The three-story brick, sandstone and copper Classical Revival building was constructed in 1901 to a design by A. B. Pinkham. The building, located at the corner of Gaylord and Washington Streets, has three commercial storefronts facing Washington Street, which are separated by sandstone piers. The residential entrance lies on Gaylord Street recessed in a rounded sandstone archway. The exterior of the upper floors consists of protruding sections finished in pressed copper, including a rounded corner section, and sections of brick. A heavy denticulated copper cornice overhangs both street-facing facades.

The building was listed on the National Register of Historic Places in 2013. It is one of the oldest brick apartment buildings in the Codman Square area.

== See also ==
- National Register of Historic Places listings in southern Boston, Massachusetts
