= National Register of Historic Places listings in southern Boston =

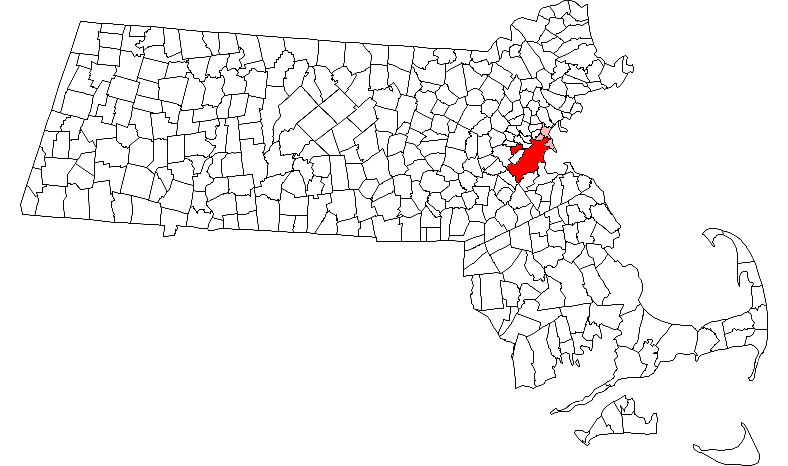
Location of Boston in Massachusetts

Boston, Massachusetts, is home to many listings on the National Register of Historic Places. This list encompasses those locations that are located south of the Massachusetts Turnpike. See National Register of Historic Places listings in northern Boston for listings north of the Turnpike. Properties and districts located elsewhere in Suffolk County's other three municipalities are also listed separately.

There are more than 350 properties and districts listed on the National Register in Suffolk County, including 58 National Historic Landmarks. The southern part of the city of Boston is the location of 187 of these properties and districts, including 13 National Historic Landmarks. Two historic districts overlap into both northern and southern Boston: milestones that make up the 1767 Milestones are found in both areas, and the Olmsted Park System extends through much of the city.

Contents: Counties in Massachusetts

Barnstable | Berkshire | Bristol | Dukes | Essex | Franklin | Hampden | Hampshire | Middlesex | Nantucket | Norfolk | Plymouth | Suffolk | Worcester

This National Park Service list is complete through NPS recent listings posted November 13, 2026.

== Key ==
National Register of Historic Places
National Register of Historic Places Historic district
National Historic Landmark
National Historic Landmark District
National Historic Site, National Historical Park, National Memorial, or National Monument
Delisted Landmark

== Current listings ==
	Name on the Register	Image	Date listed	Location	City or town	Description
1	1767 Milestones	1767 Milestones	April 7, 1971 (#71000084)	Between Boston and Springfield along Old Post Rd. 42°19′48″N 71°05′29″W	Roxbury, Mission Hill	Includes markers in Allston-Brighton, and markers in Hampden, Middlesex, and Worcester counties
2	Abbotsford	Abbotsford	September 16, 1987 (#87000885)	300 Walnut Ave. 42°18′58″N 71°05′35″W	Roxbury	
3	Adams-Nervine Asylum	Adams-Nervine Asylum	June 1, 1982 (#82004456)	990–1020 Centre St. 42°18′13″N 71°07′31″W	Jamaica Plain	
4	All Saints' Church	All Saints' Church	June 16, 1980 (#80000678)	211 Ashmont St. 42°17′09″N 71°03′48″W	Dorchester	
5	Allston Congregational Church	Allston Congregational Church	November 7, 1997 (#97001377)	31–41 Quint Ave. 42°21′06″N 71°08′05″W	Allston	
6	Almont Apartments	Almont Apartments	September 22, 2014 (#14000698)	1439–1443 & 1447–1451 Blue Hill Ave. 42°16′29″N 71°05′38″W	Mattapan	
7	Larz Anderson Park Historic District	Larz Anderson Park Historic District	October 17, 1985 (#85003245)	Bounded by Goddard and Avon Sts. 42°18′43″N 71°08′10″W	Jamaica Plain	Extends into Brookline in Norfolk County
8	Arnold Arboretum	Arnold Arboretum	October 15, 1966 (#66000127)	22 Divinity Ave. 42°17′55″N 71°07′30″W	Jamaica Plain and Roslindale	
9	Ascension-Caproni Historic District	Ascension-Caproni Historic District	December 23, 2019 (#100004335)	Roughly bounded by Washington St., Newcomb St, Thorndike St. & Reed St. 42°20′02″N 71°04′44″W	Roxbury	
10	Sarah J. Baker School	Sarah J. Baker School	July 7, 1983 (#83004285)	33 Perrin St. 42°19′20″N 71°04′48″W	Roxbury	
11	Bellevue Standpipe	Bellevue Standpipe	January 18, 1990 (#89002251)	On Bellevue Hill at Washington St. and Roxbury Parkway; 42°16′31″N 71°08′40″W	West Roxbury	
12	Benedict Fenwick School	Benedict Fenwick School	February 11, 2004 (#04000023)	150 Magnolia St. 42°18′49″N 71°04′21″W	Dorchester	
13	Berger Factory	Berger Factory	April 9, 1980 (#80000677)	37 Williams St. 42°19′58″N 71°04′59″W	Roxbury	
14	Bigelow School	Bigelow School	February 21, 1985 (#85000316)	350 W. 4th St. 42°21′08″N 71°02′52″W	South Boston	
15	James Blake House	James Blake House	May 1, 1974 (#74002350)	735 Columbia Rd. 42°19′11″N 71°03′37″W	Dorchester	
16	Blue Hills Parkway	Blue Hills Parkway	June 23, 2003 (#03000574)	Blue Hills Parkway; 42°15′21″N 71°05′38″W	Mattapan	Extends into Milton in Norfolk County
17	Boston Consumptives Hospital	Boston Consumptives Hospital	February 7, 2002 (#01001557)	249 River St. 42°16′34″N 71°05′01″W	Dorchester	
18	Boston Harbor Islands Archeological District	Boston Harbor Islands Archeological District	December 21, 1985 (#85003323)	Address Restricted	Boston Harbor	Extends into Quincy in Norfolk County and Hingham in Plymouth County
19	Boston Light	Boston Light	October 15, 1966 (#66000133)	Little Brewster Island, Boston Harbor; 42°19′41″N 70°53′26″W	Boston Harbor	
20	Boston Young Men's Christian Association	Boston Young Men's Christian Association	August 20, 1998 (#98001082)	312–320 Huntington Ave. 42°20′27″N 71°05′14″W	Fenway–Kenmore	
21	Bowditch School	Bowditch School	August 3, 1990 (#90001145)	80–82 Green St. 42°18′42″N 71°06′36″W	Jamaica Plain	
22	Brandegee Estate	Brandegee Estate	October 17, 1985 (#85003244)	280 Newton St. 42°18′18″N 71°08′05″W	Chestnut Hill	Extends into Brookline in Norfolk County
23	Brighton Center Historic District	Brighton Center Historic District	February 20, 2001 (#01000088)	Academy Hill Rd., Chestnut Hill Ave., Dighton, Elko, Henshaw, Leicester, Market, Washington, and Winship Sts. 42°20′57″N 71°09′13″W	Brighton	
24	Brighton Evangelical Congregational Church	Brighton Evangelical Congregational Church	August 21, 1997 (#97000920)	404–410 Washington St. 42°20′55″N 71°09′22″W	Brighton	
25	Brook Farm	Brook Farm	October 15, 1966 (#66000141)	670 Baker St. 42°17′14″N 71°10′43″W	West Roxbury	
26	Buildings at 825–829 Blue Hill Avenue	Buildings at 825–829 Blue Hill Avenue	September 10, 2014 (#14000561)	825–829 Blue Hill Ave. 42°17′49″N 71°05′16″W	Dorchester	
27	Calf Pasture Pumping Station Complex	Calf Pasture Pumping Station Complex	August 2, 1990 (#90001095)	435 Mount Vernon St. 42°18′48″N 71°02′01″W	Dorchester	
28	Camden Street Development Historic District	Camden Street Development Historic District	May 26, 2022 (#100007727)	50–60 Camden St., 15–35 Brannon Harris Way, 575–585 Shawmut Ave. 42°20′11″N 71°04′46″W	Roxbury	
29	Cartoof & Sherman Apartments	Cartoof & Sherman Apartments	November 12, 2020 (#100005763)	31–35 Wales St. 42°17′48″N 71°05′06″W	Dorchester	
30	Cathedral of St. George Historic District	Cathedral of St. George Historic District	November 25, 1998 (#98001361)	517–523–525 E. Broadway; 42°20′07″N 71°02′37″W	South Boston	
31	Charles Street African Methodist Episcopal Church	Charles Street African Methodist Episcopal Church	September 1, 1983 (#83000601)	551 Warren St. 42°18′45″N 71°05′03″W	Roxbury	
32	Charlotte Street-Esmond Street Historic District	Charlotte Street-Esmond Street Historic District	December 1, 2022 (#100008419)	682–754 Blue Hill Ave., 50 and 64 Bradshaw, 12–62 Charlotte, 9–71 Esmond,12–16 and 206 McLellan Sts. 42°17′59″N 71°05′10″W	Dorchester	
33	Chestnut Hill Reservoir Historic District	Chestnut Hill Reservoir Historic District	January 18, 1990 (#89002271)	Beacon St. and Commonwealth Ave. 42°19′58″N 71°09′27″W	Brighton	Extends into Newton.
34	Christ Church	Christ Church	January 30, 1986 (#86000140)	1220 River St. 42°15′38″N 71°07′48″W	Hyde Park	
35	Clapp Houses	Clapp Houses	May 2, 1974 (#74000911)	199 and 195 Boston St. 42°19′12″N 71°03′25″W	Dorchester	Home of the Dorchester Historic Society
36	Codman Square District	Codman Square District	June 23, 1983 (#83000602)	Norfolk, Talbot, Epping, Lithgow, Centre, and Moultrie Sts. 42°17′25″N 71°04′16″W	Dorchester	
37	Collins Building	Collins Building	June 8, 2005 (#05000559)	213–217 Washington St. 42°18′02″N 71°04′37″W	Dorchester	
38	Columbia Road–Bellevue Street Historic District	Columbia Road–Bellevue Street Historic District	September 8, 2017 (#100001582)	400–500 Block of Columbia Rd., and parts of Bellevue St. 42°18′46″N 71°04′06″W	Dorchester	
39	Columbia Road–Devon Street Historic District	Columbia Road–Devon Street Historic District	July 17, 2017 (#100001315)	193–231 (odd) & 200–204 (even) Columbia Rd. 42°18′25″N 71°04′35″W	Roxbury	
40	Columbia Road-Strathcona Road Historic District	Columbia Road-Strathcona Road Historic District	August 3, 2018 (#100002734)	90–94,102–108, 105–111, 129–135, 137, 143–147, 150–156 Columbia & 16 Strathcona Rds., 114–126 Washington St. 42°18′21″N 71°04′46″W	Roxbury	
41	Columbus Avenue and Bragdon Street Historic District		May 6, 2024 (#100010279)	Roughly bounded by Dimock Street to the north, Amory Street to the west, and West Walnut Park to the south 42°19′07″N 71°05′56″W	Roxbury	
42	Congregation Adath Jeshurun	Congregation Adath Jeshurun	November 12, 1999 (#99001304)	397 Blue Hill Ave. 42°18′43″N 71°04′53″W	Dorchester	
43	Crawford Street Historic District	Crawford Street Historic District	November 18, 2020 (#100005798)	5–38 Crawford St., 42 Elm Hill Ave., 621 Warren St. 42°18′40″N 71°05′06″W	Roxbury	
44	Cyclorama Building	Cyclorama Building	April 13, 1973 (#73000318)	543–547 Tremont St. 42°20′40″N 71°04′19″W	South End	
45	Sarah Davidson Apartment Block	Sarah Davidson Apartment Block	December 18, 2013 (#13000928)	3 Gaylord St. 42°17′56″N 71°04′23″W	Dorchester	
46	Dearborn School	Dearborn School	August 2, 2000 (#00000871)	25 Ambrose St. 42°19′46″N 71°04′42″W	Roxbury	
47	Dillaway School	Dillaway School	April 9, 1980 (#80001683)	16–20 Kenilworth St. 42°19′43″N 71°05′14″W	Roxbury	
48	Dimock Community Health Center Complex	Dimock Community Health Center Complex	February 21, 1985 (#85000317)	41 and 55 Dimock St. 42°19′14″N 71°05′51″W	Roxbury	
49	District 13 Police Station	District 13 Police Station	February 10, 1988 (#87002549)	28 Seaverns Ave. 42°18′43″N 71°06′46″W	Jamaica Plain	
50	Dixwell Street Apartments Historic District	Dixwell Street Apartments Historic District	October 24, 2024 (#100010939)	12–14, 18–20 Dixwell Street; 1989–1991 Columbus Avenue, 7–9 Dixwell Street, 11–13 Dixwell Street, 17 Dixwell Street, 21–23 Dixwell Street; 42°18′52″N 71°05′52″W	Jamaica Plain	
51	Dorchester Heights Historic District	Dorchester Heights Historic District	November 1, 2001 (#01001198)	Roughly a one block area surrounding Telegraph Hill; 42°19′58″N 71°02′48″W	South Boston	
52	Dorchester Heights National Historic Site	Dorchester Heights National Historic Site	October 15, 1966 (#66000050)	South Boston; 42°19′58″N 71°02′47″W	South Boston	
53	Dorchester North Burying Ground	Dorchester North Burying Ground	April 18, 1974 (#74000915)	Stoughton St. and Columbia Rd. 42°19′00″N 71°03′52″W	Dorchester	
54	Dorchester Park	Dorchester Park	February 20, 2008 (#08000089)	Bounded by Dorchester Ave., Richmond, Adams, and Richview Sts. 42°16′34″N 71°04′01″W	Dorchester	
55	Dorchester Pottery Works	Dorchester Pottery Works	February 21, 1985 (#85000318)	101–105 Victory Rd. 42°17′49″N 71°03′05″W	Dorchester	
56	Dorchester South Burying Ground	Dorchester South Burying Ground	June 27, 2014 (#14000365)	2095 Dorchester Ave. 42°16′43″N 71°04′01″W	Dorchester	
57	Dorchester Temple Baptist Church	Dorchester Temple Baptist Church	January 16, 1998 (#97001239)	670 Washington St. 42°17′17″N 71°04′17″W	Dorchester	
58	Dorchester-Milton Lower Mills Industrial District	Dorchester-Milton Lower Mills Industrial District	April 2, 1980 (#80000675)	Both sides of the Neponset River; also Adams, River, and Medway Sts., Millers Lane, and Eliot and Adams Sts. 42°16′16″N 71°04′08″W	Dorchester	Extends into Milton in Norfolk County; second set of addresses represents a boundary increase
59	Frederick Douglass Square Historic District	Frederick Douglass Square Historic District	October 3, 1996 (#96001063)	Roughly bounded by Hammond St., Cobat St., Windsor St., and Westminster St., Lower Roxbury; 42°20′09″N 71°05′04″W	Roxbury	
60	Dudley Station Historic District	Dudley Station Historic District	December 5, 1985 (#85003074)	Washington, Warren, and Dudley Sts. 42°19′48″N 71°05′04″W	Roxbury	
61	Dudley Terrace–Dudley Street Historic District	Dudley Terrace–Dudley Street Historic District	December 1, 2022 (#100008435)	2–12 Dudley Terr., 713, 715–723, and 722–726 Dudley Street; 42°19′05″N 71°04′02″W	Dorchester	
62	Samuel Edelman Apartments	Samuel Edelman Apartments	March 5, 2019 (#100003471)	97–103 Norfolk St. 42°17′18″N 71°04′34″W	Dorchester	
63	Edna G. shipwreck (Eastern Rig dragger)	Edna G. shipwreck (Eastern Rig dragger)	November 22, 2010 (#10000039)	Stellwagen Bank National Marine Sanctuary	Boston vicinity	Eastern Rig Dragger Fishing Vessel Shipwrecks in the Stellwagen Bank National Marine Sanctuary MPS
64	Egleston Substation	Egleston Substation	December 27, 2010 (#10001066)	3025 Washington St. 42°19′01″N 71°05′51″W	Jamaica Plain	
65	Eliot Burying Ground	Eliot Burying Ground	June 25, 1974 (#74000388)	Eustis and Washington Sts. 42°19′55″N 71°04′55″W	Roxbury	
66	Eliot Congregational Church	Eliot Congregational Church	February 9, 1994 (#93001587)	56 Dale St., corner 118–120 Walnut St. 42°19′10″N 71°04′55″W	Roxbury	
67	Eliot Hall	Eliot Hall	July 15, 1988 (#88000959)	7A Eliot St. 42°18′37″N 71°06′59″W	Jamaica Plain	
68	Elm Hill Avenue-Georgia Street-Cheney Street Historic District	Elm Hill Avenue-Georgia Street-Cheney Street Historic District	August 21, 2023 (#100009285)	Elm Hill Ave, Cheney, Georgia, Hartwell, Homestead, Maple, Montana, Pleasanton, and Ruthven Sts. 42°18′46″N 71°05′24″W	Roxbury	
69	Elm Hill Park Historic District	Elm Hill Park Historic District	February 1, 2021 (#100006078)	2–38 Elm Hill Park, 538–570 Warren St. 42°18′46″N 71°04′57″W	Roxbury	
70	Esmond Street Historic District	Esmond Street Historic District	November 5, 2018 (#100003070)	Bicknell, Bradshaw, Esmond, & Harvard Sts. 42°17′51″N 71°05′02″W	Dorchester	
71	Evergreen Cemetery	Evergreen Cemetery	August 14, 2009 (#09000612)	2060 Commonwealth Ave. 42°20′20″N 71°09′43″W	Brighton	
72	Fairview Cemetery	Fairview Cemetery	September 16, 2009 (#09000717)	45 Fairview Ave. 42°14′45″N 71°08′19″W	Hyde Park	
73	Fenway Park	Fenway Park	March 7, 2012 (#12000069)	24, & 2–4 Yawkey Wy., 64–76 Brookline Ave., & 70–80 Lansdowne St. 42°20′50″N 71°05′47″W	Fenway–Kenmore	Longtime home of Boston Red Sox built in 1912; has been oldest ballpark in use by Major League Baseball since 1999.
74	Fenway Studios	Fenway Studios	September 13, 1978 (#78000473)	30 Ipswich St. 42°20′50″N 71°05′28″W	Fenway–Kenmore	
75	Fenway-Boylston Street District	Fenway-Boylston Street District	September 4, 1984 (#84002875)	Fenway, Boylston, Westland, and Hemenway Sts. 42°20′43″N 71°05′26″W	Fenway–Kenmore	
76	Fields Corner Municipal Building	Fields Corner Municipal Building	November 12, 1981 (#81000620)	1 Arcadia St., 195 Adams St. 42°18′07″N 71°03′38″W	Dorchester	
77	First Church of Jamaica Plain	First Church of Jamaica Plain	July 15, 1988 (#88000955)	6 Eliot St. 42°18′35″N 71°07′00″W	Jamaica Plain	
78	First Congregational Church of Hyde Park	First Congregational Church of Hyde Park	November 12, 1999 (#99001308)	6 Webster St. 42°15′27″N 71°07′15″W	Hyde Park	
79	Forest Hills Cemetery	Forest Hills Cemetery	November 17, 2004 (#04001219)	95 Forest Hills Ave. 42°17′35″N 71°06′29″W	Jamaica Plain	
80	Fort Independence	Fort Independence	October 15, 1970 (#70000921)	Castle Island; 42°20′17″N 71°00′42″W	South Boston	
81	Fort Warren	Fort Warren	August 29, 1970 (#70000540)	Georges Island, Boston Harbor; 42°19′11″N 70°55′43″W	Boston Harbor	
82	Fowler-Clark-Epstein Farmstead	Fowler-Clark-Epstein Farmstead	March 16, 2020 (#100005089)	487 Norfolk St. 42°16′47″N 71°05′20″W	Mattapan	
83	Frances and Isabella Apartments	Frances and Isabella Apartments	February 22, 2002 (#02000081)	430–432 and 434–436 Dudley St. 42°19′27″N 71°04′29″W	Roxbury	
84	Francis Street–Fenwood Road Historic District	Francis Street–Fenwood Road Historic District	June 23, 2016 (#16000409)	Roughly bounded by Huntington Ave., Francis, Vining & Fenwood Sts., St. Albans Rd. 42°20′05″N 71°06′23″W	Longwood	
85	Isabella Stewart Gardner Museum	Isabella Stewart Gardner Museum	January 27, 1983 (#83000603)	280 The Fenway; 42°20′17″N 71°05′59″W	Fenway–Kenmore	
86	William Lloyd Garrison House	William Lloyd Garrison House	October 15, 1966 (#66000653)	125 Highland St. 42°19′34″N 71°05′38″W	Roxbury	
87	William Lloyd Garrison School	William Lloyd Garrison School	April 16, 1980 (#80000674)	20 Hutchings St. 42°18′34″N 71°05′22″W	Roxbury	
88	Goldsmith Block	Goldsmith Block	June 5, 2007 (#07000510)	41 Ruggles St., 746–750 Shawmut Ave. 42°19′56″N 71°05′02″W	Roxbury	
89	Governor Shirley Square Historic District	Governor Shirley Square Historic District	July 18, 2016 (#16000454)	Dudley, Hampden, Dunmore & Magazine Sts., Blue Hill & Mt. Pleasant Ave. 42°19′33″N 71°04′31″W	Roxbury	
90	Graves Light Station	Graves Light Station	September 28, 1987 (#87002041)	Entrance to North Channel, Boston Harbor; 42°21′54″N 70°52′11″W	Boston Harbor	
91	Greek Orthodox Cathedral of New England	Greek Orthodox Cathedral of New England	June 30, 1988 (#88000957)	520 Parker St. 42°20′11″N 71°05′39″W	Fenway–Kenmore	
92	Green Street (East) Historic District		November 2, 2026 (#100013561)	165-190 Green Street, 124-132 Brookside Avenue, 4 Union Avenue; 42°18′36″N 71°06′22″W	Jamaica Plain	
93	Greenville Street Historic District	Greenville Street Historic District	February 11, 2021 (#100006134)	2, 6–25 Greenville St. 42°19′40″N 71°04′51″W	Roxbury	
94	Greenwood Memorial United Methodist Church	Greenwood Memorial United Methodist Church	March 8, 2002 (#02000154)	378A–380 Washington St. 42°17′49″N 71°04′19″W	Dorchester	
95	Haffenreffer Brewery	Haffenreffer Brewery	May 2, 1982 (#82004453)	Germania St. 42°18′52″N 71°06′15″W	Jamaica Plain	
96	Edward Everett Hale House	Edward Everett Hale House	March 21, 1979 (#73000325)	12 Morley St. 42°19′44″N 71°05′33″W	Roxbury	
97	John Harris House and Farm	John Harris House and Farm	October 17, 1985 (#85003246)	284 Newton St. 42°18′19″N 71°08′35″W	Chestnut Hill	Extends into Brookline in Norfolk County
98	Harrison Square Historic District	Harrison Square Historic District	October 22, 2002 (#02001190)	Bounded by MBTA Braintree line embankment, Park, Everett, Freeport, Mill, Asland, Blanche Sts., Victory Rd. 42°18′07″N 71°03′13″W	Dorchester	
99	Harriswood Crescent	Harriswood Crescent	March 13, 1986 (#86000375)	60–88 Harold St. 42°19′05″N 71°05′47″W	Roxbury	
100	Harvard Avenue Fire Station	Harvard Avenue Fire Station	March 31, 1983 (#83000605)	16 Harvard Ave. 42°21′19″N 71°07′58″W	Allston	
101	Harvard Avenue Historic District	Harvard Avenue Historic District	April 28, 2000 (#00000415)	Roughly bounded by Linden St., Commonwealth Ave., Harvard Ave., and Park Vale Ave. 42°21′12″N 71°07′58″W	Allston	
102	Edward H. Haskell Home for Nurses	Edward H. Haskell Home for Nurses	February 26, 2004 (#04000085)	220 Fisther Ave., 63 Parker Hill Ave. 42°19′49″N 71°06′36″W	Mission Hill	
103	Hibernian Hall	Hibernian Hall	June 2, 2004 (#04000534)	182–186 Dudley St. 42°19′43″N 71°04′57″W	Roxbury	
104	Highland Spring Brewery Bottling and Storage Buildings	Highland Spring Brewery Bottling and Storage Buildings	May 28, 2010 (#10000300)	154–166 Terrace St. 42°19′37″N 71°05′55″W	Mission Hill	
105	Home for Aged Couples	Home for Aged Couples	August 11, 2005 (#05000879)	409, 419 Walnut Ave. and 2055 Columbus Ave. 42°18′49″N 71°05′43″W	Jamaica Plain	
106	Home for Destitute Jewish Children	Home for Destitute Jewish Children	October 8, 2014 (#14000840)	150–156 American Legion Hwy. 42°17′41″N 71°05′34″W	Dorchester	Now houses a community center and charter school.
107	Homestead Street Apartments Historic District	Homestead Street Apartments Historic District	August 29, 2023 (#100009306)	119–167 Homestead St. 42°18′40″N 71°05′19″W	Roxbury	
108	House at 17 Cranston Street	House at 17 Cranston Street	November 20, 1987 (#87001398)	17 Cranston St. 42°19′14″N 71°06′35″W	Jamaica Plain	
109	Timothy Hoxie House	Timothy Hoxie House	November 20, 1987 (#87001399)	135 Hillside St. 42°19′52″N 71°06′19″W	Mission Hill	
110	Humboldt Avenue Historic District	Humboldt Avenue Historic District	November 22, 2021 (#100007147)	249, 257, 259 Humboldt Ave. and 79–83, 94 Hutchings St. 42°18′40″N 71°05′28″W	Roxbury	
111	Hyde Park High School	Hyde Park High School	October 28, 2024 (#100010943)	15 Everett Street; 42°15′27″N 71°07′19″W	Hyde Park	The 1902–1928 building, more recently the William Barton Rogers School, now residential.
112	Intervale Street-Blue Hill Avenue Historic District	Intervale Street-Blue Hill Avenue Historic District	November 13, 2020 (#100005783)	Blue Hill Ave. and Intervale St. 42°18′42″N 71°04′48″W	Dorchester	
113	Intervale Street-Columbia Road Historic District	Intervale Street-Columbia Road Historic District	February 28, 2019 (#100003470)	117–121, 123–127, 129–135, 137–143, 145–159, 161, 162 Intervale St. & 282–284, 286–288 Columbia Rd. 42°18′35″N 71°04′32″W	Dorchester	
114	John Eliot Square District	John Eliot Square District	April 23, 1973 (#73000854)	John Eliot Sq. 42°19′47″N 71°05′27″W	Roxbury	
115	Joshua Bates School	Joshua Bates School	August 22, 2008 (#08000793)	731 Harrison Ave. 42°20′15″N 71°04′18″W	South End	
116	Alvah Kittredge House	Alvah Kittredge House	May 8, 1973 (#73000855)	12 Linwood St. 42°19′47″N 71°05′38″W	Roxbury	
117	Lawrence Avenue Historic District	Lawrence Avenue Historic District	February 11, 2021 (#100006127)	Blue Hill Ave., Lawrence Ave., Coleus Park, Magnolia St., and Intervale St. 42°18′43″N 71°04′37″W	Dorchester	
118	Lawrence Model Lodging Houses	Lawrence Model Lodging Houses	September 22, 1983 (#83000606)	79, 89, 99 and 109 E. Canton St. 42°20′17″N 71°04′14″W	South End	
119	Lenox Street Apartments Historic District	Lenox Street Apartments Historic District	February 29, 2024 (#100009977)	Lenox St, Shawmut Ave, Kendall St, Ditmus Ct, Lattimore Ct, Trotter Ct; 42°20′12″N 71°04′52″W	Roxbury	
120	Malcolm X—Ella Little-Collins House	Malcolm X—Ella Little-Collins House	February 12, 2021 (#100005455)	72 Dale St. 42°19′17″N 71°05′11″W	Roxbury	
121	Long Island Head Light	Long Island Head Light	June 15, 1987 (#87001481)	Long Island; 42°19′49″N 70°57′28″W	Boston Harbor	
122	Harrison Loring House	Harrison Loring House	September 1, 1983 (#83000604)	789 E. Broadway St. 42°20′07″N 71°02′01″W	South Boston	
123	Loring–Greenough House	Loring–Greenough House	April 26, 1972 (#72000544)	12 South St. 42°18′35″N 71°06′56″W	Jamaica Plain	
124	Lower Roxbury Historic District	Lower Roxbury Historic District	December 9, 1994 (#94001494)	Roughly the area surrounding Coventry, Cunard, and Walpole Sts. 42°20′11″N 71°05′12″W	Roxbury	
125	Massachusetts Historical Society Building	Massachusetts Historical Society Building	October 15, 1966 (#66000770)	1154 Boylston St. 42°20′47″N 71°05′26″W	Fenway–Kenmore	
126	Massachusetts Mental Health Center	Massachusetts Mental Health Center	January 21, 1994 (#93001489)	74 Fenwood Rd. 42°20′08″N 71°06′35″W	Fenway–Kenmore	Campus demolished in 2010.
127	Massachusetts School of Art	Massachusetts School of Art	August 3, 1989 (#89000974)	364 Brookline Ave. 42°20′20″N 71°06′24″W	Fenway–Kenmore	
128	Mission Hill Triangle Historic District	Mission Hill Triangle Historic District	November 6, 1989 (#89001747)	Roughly bounded by Smith St., Worthington St., Tremont St., and Huntington Ave. 42°20′02″N 71°06′09″W	Mission Hill	
129	Monument Square Historic District	Monument Square Historic District	October 11, 1990 (#90001536)	Roughly bounded by Jamaicaway, Pond, Centre and Eliot Sts. 42°18′34″N 71°06′57″W	Jamaica Plain	Not to be confused with Monument Square Historic District (Charlestown, Boston, Massachusetts), where the Bunker Hill Monument is located.
130	Moreland Street Historic District	Moreland Street Historic District	March 29, 1984 (#84002890)	Roughly bounded by Kearsarge, Blue Hill Aves., Warren, Waverly, and Winthrop Sts. 42°19′25″N 71°04′48″W	Roxbury	
131	Morton Street, Metropolitan Park System of Greater Boston	Morton Street, Metropolitan Park System of Greater Boston	January 24, 2005 (#04001572)	Morton St. between Arborway and Gallivan Blvd. 42°17′11″N 71°05′27″W	Jamaica Plain	
132	Mount Hope Cemetery	Mount Hope Cemetery	September 24, 2009 (#09000767)	355 Walk Hill St. 42°17′12″N 71°06′19″W	Roslindale	
133	Mount Pleasant Historic District	Mount Pleasant Historic District	February 9, 1989 (#89000004)	Roughly bounded by Forest St. and Mount Pleasant Ave. 42°19′33″N 71°04′43″W	Roxbury	
134	Nazing Court Apartments	Nazing Court Apartments	May 12, 2004 (#04000426)	224–236 Seaver St. and 1–8 Nazing Court; 42°18′13″N 71°05′36″W	Roxbury	
135	Neponset Valley Parkway, Metropolitan Park System of Greater Boston	Neponset Valley Parkway, Metropolitan Park System of Greater Boston	January 24, 2005 (#04001573)	Neponset Valley Parkway; 42°14′14″N 71°07′36″W	Hyde Park	Extends into Milton in Norfolk County
136	New England Conservatory of Music	New England Conservatory of Music	May 14, 1980 (#80000672)	290 Huntington Ave. 42°20′26″N 71°05′13″W	Fenway–Kenmore	
137	New Riding Club	New Riding Club	August 20, 1987 (#87001394)	52 Hemenway St. 42°20′42″N 71°05′23″W	Fenway–Kenmore	
138	Nix's Mate Daybeacon	Nix's Mate Daybeacon	March 18, 2004 (#04000189)	Nubble Channel, The Narrows, Boston Harbor; 42°19′56″N 70°56′42″W	Boston Harbor	
139	Oak Square School	Oak Square School	November 10, 1980 (#80000465)	35 Nonantum St. 42°20′59″N 71°10′10″W	Brighton	
140	Old Harbor Reservation Parkways, Metropolitan Park System of Greater Boston	Old Harbor Reservation Parkways, Metropolitan Park System of Greater Boston	July 24, 2008 (#08000693)	William J. Day Boulevard, Columbia Rd. between Farragut Rd and Kosciuszko Cir., and Old Colony Ave. between Pacuska Ave. 42°19′46″N 71°02′45″W	South Boston	
141	Olmsted Park System	Olmsted Park System	December 8, 1971 (#71000086)	Encompassing the Back Bay Fens, Muddy River, Olmsted (Leverett Park), Jamaica Park, Arborway, and Franklin Park; 42°20′43″N 71°05′45″W	Jamaica Plain and Fenway–Kenmore	
142	Theodore Parker Unitarian Universalist Church	Theodore Parker Unitarian Universalist Church	June 29, 2020 (#100005274)	1859 Centre St. 42°17′10″N 71°09′18″W	West Roxbury	
143	Paul's Bridge	Paul's Bridge	December 11, 1972 (#72000140)	Neponset Valley Parkway over the Neponset River; 42°14′04″N 71°07′24″W	Hyde Park	Extends into Milton in Norfolk County
144	The Peabody	The Peabody	August 8, 2001 (#01000872)	195–197 Ashmont St. 42°17′07″N 71°03′53″W	Dorchester	
145	Pierce House	Pierce House	April 26, 1974 (#74000917)	24 Oakton Ave. 42°17′13″N 71°03′13″W	Dorchester	
146	Pilgrim Congregational Church	Pilgrim Congregational Church	December 18, 2013 (#13000929)	540–544 Columbia Road; 42°18′58″N 71°04′01″W	Dorchester	
147	Repertory Theatre of Boston	Repertory Theatre of Boston	August 29, 2023 (#100009307)	264 Huntington Ave. 42°20′31″N 71°05′09″W	Back Bay	Now home to the Huntington Theatre Company.
148	Ellen H. Swallow Richards House	Ellen H. Swallow Richards House	March 31, 1992 (#92001874)	32 Eliot St. 42°18′57″N 71°07′06″W	Jamaica Plain	
149	The Riviera	The Riviera	December 7, 1995 (#95001450)	270 Huntington Ave. 42°20′30″N 71°05′11″W	Fenway–Kenmore	
150	Roslindale Baptist Church	Roslindale Baptist Church	November 5, 1998 (#98001330)	52 Cummins Highway; 42°17′07″N 71°07′41″W	Roslindale	
151	Roslindale Congregational Church	Roslindale Congregational Church	July 26, 1991 (#91000925)	25 Cummins Highway at its junction with Summer Ave. 42°17′42″N 71°07′43″W	Roslindale	
152	Roslindale Substation	Roslindale Substation	August 27, 2013 (#13000621)	4228 Washington St., 42°17′11″N 71°07′41″W	Roslindale	
153	Roxbury High Fort	Roxbury High Fort	April 23, 1973 (#73000856)	Beech Glen St. at Fort Ave. 42°19′16″N 71°05′24″W	Roxbury	
154	Roxbury Highlands Historic District	Roxbury Highlands Historic District	February 22, 1989 (#89000147)	Roughly bounded by Dudley St., Washington St., and Columbus Ave. 42°19′32″N 71°05′26″W	Roxbury	
155	Roxbury Presbyterian Church	Roxbury Presbyterian Church	March 15, 1991 (#89002125)	328 Warren St. 42°19′10″N 71°04′55″W	Roxbury	
156	Saint Augustine Chapel and Cemetery	Saint Augustine Chapel and Cemetery	September 18, 1987 (#87001495)	Dorchester St. between W. 6th and Tudor Sts. 42°20′02″N 71°03′00″W	South Boston	
157	St. Joseph's Roman Catholic Church Complex	St. Joseph's Roman Catholic Church Complex	December 28, 1989 (#89002169)	Bounded by Circuit, Regent, Hulbert, and Fenwick Sts. 42°19′26″N 71°05′16″W	Roxbury	
158	St. Luke's and St. Margaret's Church	St. Luke's and St. Margaret's Church	November 12, 1997 (#97001472)	5–7 St. Luke's Rd. 42°21′07″N 71°07′40″W	Allston	
159	Saint Mark's Episcopal Church	Saint Mark's Episcopal Church	July 3, 2014 (#12000783)	73 Columbia Rd. 42°18′16″N 71°04′56″W	Dorchester	
160	St. Mary's Episcopal Church	St. Mary's Episcopal Church	October 30, 1998 (#98001292)	14–16 Cushing Ave. 42°18′59″N 71°03′54″W	Dorchester	
161	Savin Hill Historic District	Savin Hill Historic District	May 9, 2003 (#03000385)	Roughly bounded by Savin Hill Ave., Morrissey Boulevard, Dorchester Bay, and Interstate 93; 42°18′33″N 71°03′01″W	Dorchester	
162	Sears Roebuck and Company Mail Order Store	Sears Roebuck and Company Mail Order Store	January 15, 1991 (#90001992)	309 Park Dr. and 201 Brookline Ave. 42°20′41″N 71°06′12″W	Fenway–Kenmore	A former Sears building now known as Landmark Center
163	Second Church in Boston	Second Church in Boston	June 24, 2010 (#10000391)	874, 876, 880 Beacon St. 42°20′49″N 71°06′17″W	Fenway–Kenmore	
164	Sherman Apartments Historic District	Sherman Apartments Historic District	November 28, 2012 (#12000978)	544–546 Washington, 4–6, 12–14, 18 Lyndhurst Sts. 42°17′32″N 71°04′17″W	Dorchester	
165	Shirley-Eustis House	Shirley-Eustis House	October 15, 1966 (#66000787)	31–37 Shirley St. 42°19′24″N 71°04′21″W	Roxbury	
166	Benjamin Silverman Apartments	Benjamin Silverman Apartments	August 24, 2018 (#100002790)	50–52 Lorne & 4 Wilson Sts. 42°17′38″N 71°05′29″W	Dorchester	
167	South Boston Boat Clubs Historic District	South Boston Boat Clubs Historic District	September 1, 2005 (#05000936)	1793–1849 William J. Day Boulevard; 42°19′56″N 71°01′37″W	South Boston	
168	South Boston Naval Annex Historic District	South Boston Naval Annex Historic District	August 8, 2022 (#100007976)	Roughly bounded by Boston Harbor, Dry Dock and Fid Kennedy Aves., Massport Haul Rd. 42°20′43″N 71°01′58″W	South Boston	
169	South End District	South End District	May 8, 1973 (#73000324)	South Bay area between Huntington and Harrison Aves.; also 200–224 Northampton St.; also 401 Shawmut Avenue; 63- 71, 75, 77, 79, 83 West Brookline Street; 73 West Brookline Street/403 Shawmut Avenue, 1511- 1525 Washington Street; 42°20′23″N 71°04′23″W	South End	Second and third sets of addresses represents boundary increases approved December 29, 2014 and April 17, 2025.
170	Stony Brook Reservation Parkways, Metropolitan Park System of Great Boston MPS	Stony Brook Reservation Parkways, Metropolitan Park System of Great Boston MPS	January 3, 2006 (#05001509)	Dedham, Enneking, Turtle Pond Parkways, Smith Field, Reservation, W. Border Rds. 42°15′28″N 71°08′32″W	Hyde Park and West Roxbury	Extends into Dedham in Norfolk County
171	Students House	Students House	September 11, 1997 (#97000970)	96 The Fenway; 42°20′31″N 71°05′33″W	Fenway–Kenmore	
172	Sumner Hill Historic District	Sumner Hill Historic District	October 22, 1987 (#87001889)	Roughly bounded by Seaverns Ave., Everett St., Carolina Ave., and Newbern St. 42°18′35″N 71°06′43″W	Jamaica Plain	
173	Symphony and Horticultural Halls	Symphony and Horticultural Halls	May 30, 1975 (#75000301)	Massachusetts and Huntington Aves. 42°20′33″N 71°05′09″W	Fenway–Kenmore	
174	Symphony Hall	Symphony Hall	January 20, 1999 (#99000633)	301 Massachusetts Ave. 42°20′33″N 71°05′09″W	South End	
175	Thane Street Historic District	Thane Street Historic District	November 13, 2020 (#100005782)	70–78 Harvard St, 22–24, 26–28, 30–32 Thane St. 42°17′49″N 71°04′35″W	Dorchester	
176	William Monroe Trotter House	William Monroe Trotter House	May 11, 1976 (#76002003)	97 Sawyer Ave. 42°18′47″N 71°03′46″W	Dorchester	
177	Truman Parkway-Metropolitan Park System of Greater Boston	Truman Parkway-Metropolitan Park System of Greater Boston	January 5, 2005 (#04001430)	Truman Parkway; 42°14′53″N 71°06′59″W	Hyde Park	Extends into Milton in Norfolk County
178	Uphams Corner Historic District	Uphams Corner Historic District	February 26, 2024 (#100009975)	Generally along Columbia Road from Annabel Street to the north to Bird Street to the south 42°19′02″N 71°03′55″W	Dorchester	
179	Upham's Corner Market	Upham's Corner Market	October 11, 1990 (#90001537)	600 Columbia Rd. 42°19′02″N 71°03′55″W	Dorchester	
180	US Post Office Garage	US Post Office Garage	June 26, 1986 (#86001378)	135 A St. 42°20′36″N 71°03′14″W	South Boston	Destroyed
181	VFW Parkway, Metropolitan Park System of Greater Boston	VFW Parkway, Metropolitan Park System of Greater Boston	January 5, 2005 (#04001432)	VFW Parkway, between Spring and Centre Sts. 42°17′10″N 71°09′31″W	West Roxbury and Chestnut Hill	Briefly crosses into Brookline in Norfolk County.
182	Walnut Park Historic District	Walnut Park Historic District	January 21, 2022 (#100007348)	7–15 Waldren Rd., 348–363, 367 Walnut Ave., 8–81 Walnut Park, 7–20 Wardman Rd., 65–71 Westminster Ave. 42°18′55″N 71°05′45″W	Roxbury	
183	Walton and Roslin Halls	Walton and Roslin Halls	December 18, 2013 (#13000930)	702–708 & 710–726 Washington St., 3–5 Walton St. 42°17′13″N 71°04′16″W	Dorchester	
184	Nathan Warnick Apartments	Nathan Warnick Apartments	December 23, 2019 (#100003942)	57 Bicknell St. 42°17′55″N 71°04′59″W	Dorchester	
185	West Roxbury Parkway, Metropolitan Park System of Greater Boston	West Roxbury Parkway, Metropolitan Park System of Greater Boston	January 19, 2006 (#05001528)	West Roxbury Parkway, Bellevue Hill, East Border Rd., and West Border Rd. 42°18′10″N 71°09′11″W	West Roxbury and Chestnut Hill	Extends into Brookline in Norfolk County
186	Westerly Burial Ground	Westerly Burial Ground	November 20, 1987 (#87001401)	Centre St. 42°16′53″N 71°09′34″W	West Roxbury	
187	Woodbourne Historic District	Woodbourne Historic District	June 4, 1999 (#99000593)	Roughly bounded by Walk Hill, Goodway, and Wachusett Sts. 42°17′30″N 71°06′58″W	Jamaica Plain	

== See also ==
- List of National Historic Landmarks in Massachusetts
- National Register of Historic Places listings in Massachusetts
