= Collins Building (Boston, Massachusetts) =

- U.S. National Register of Historic Places
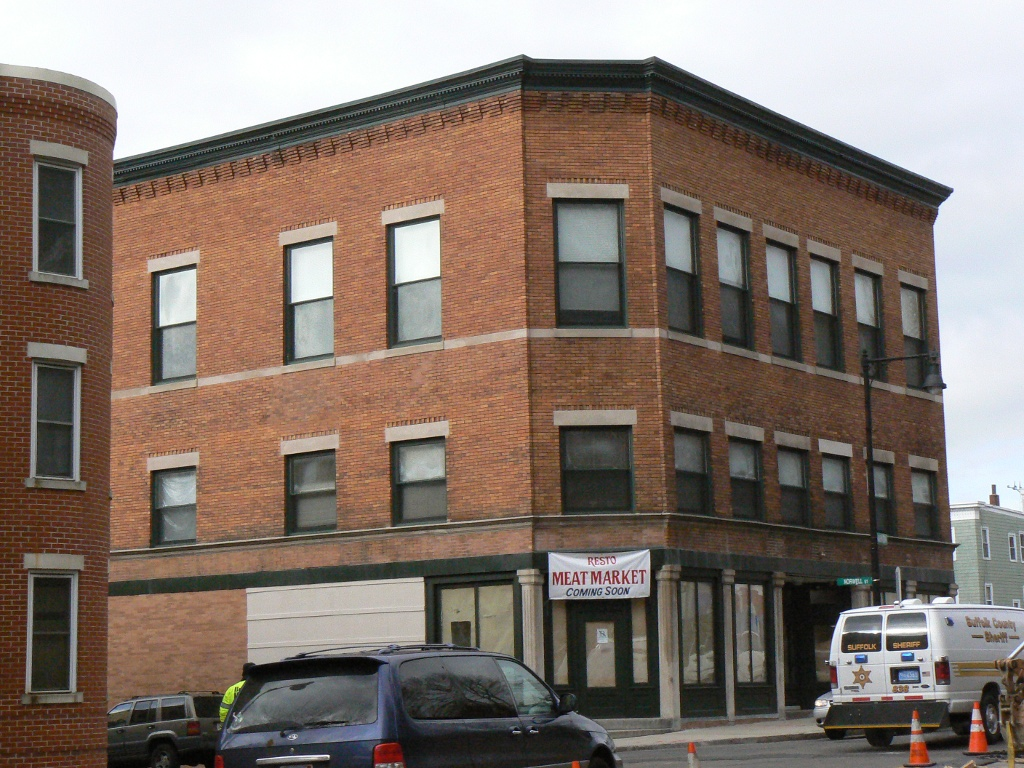

- Location within Massachusetts Location within the United States
- Location: Boston, Massachusetts
- Coordinates: 42°18′2″N 71°4′37″W
- Built: 1898
- Architect: Collins, Charles F.
- Architectural style: Colonial Revival
- NRHP reference No.: 05000559
- Added to NRHP: June 8, 2005

The Collins Building (also known as "Bowdoin Hall" or "Mt. Bowdoin Hall" or "New Washington Auditorium" or "Silver Manor") is an historic commercial building at 213-217 Washington Street in Dorchester, Boston, Massachusetts. The three-story brick building was constructed by Charles F. Collins in 1898, and originally housed retail space on the ground floor, offices on the second, and an open function space on the third. The building is one of the few older commercial properties in the Mt. Bowdoin area, and was long associated with its Jewish community.

The building was listed on the National Register of Historic Places in 2005.

== See also ==
- National Register of Historic Places listings in southern Boston, Massachusetts
