= Samuel Edelman Apartments =

Historic residential building in Boston, Massachusetts

- U.S. National Register of Historic Places
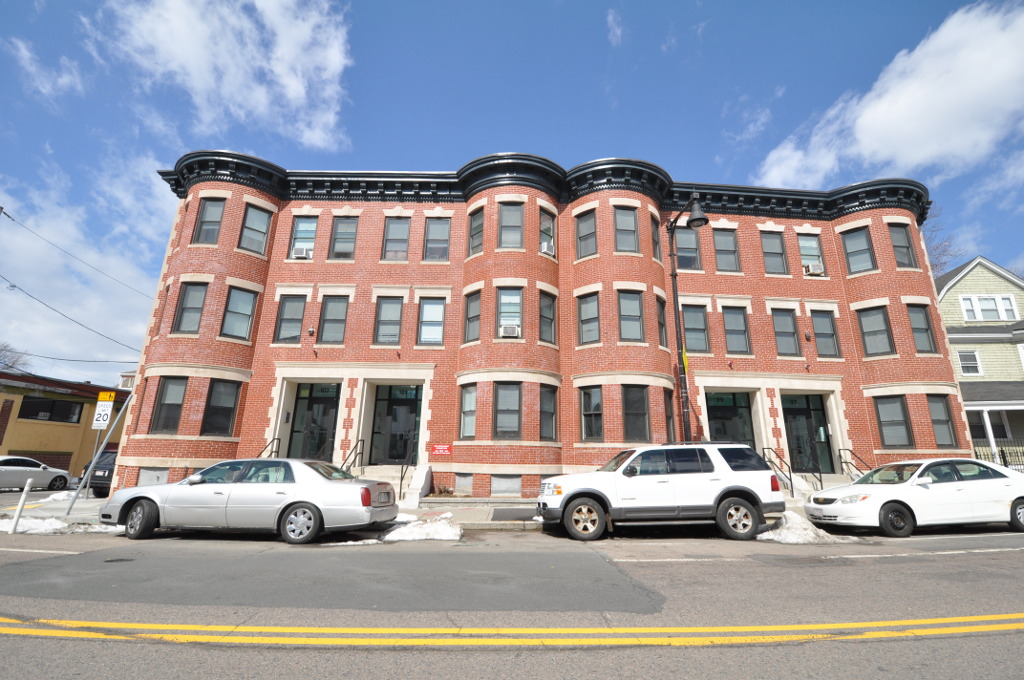

- Location within Massachusetts Location within the United States
- Location: 97-103 Street, Boston, Massachusetts
- Coordinates: 42°17′18″N 71°4′34″W
- Area: less than one acre
- Built: c. 1908
- Architectural style: Colonial Revival
- NRHP reference No.: 100003471
- Added to NRHP: March 5, 2019

The Samuel Edelman Apartments are a historic multifamily residential building at 97-103 Street in the Dorchester neighborhood of Boston, Massachusetts. It was built about 1908, during a period of major residential development of the area, and is a good example of Colonial Revival architecture in brick and stone. The building was listed on the National Register of Historic Places in 2013.

== Description and history ==
The Samuel Edelman Apartments are located in a mainly residential area of Dorchester, on the north side of Norfolk Street between Elmhurst and Darling Streets. It is a single building, three stories in height, organized with four entrances placed pairwise in surrounds flanked by projecting rounded bays. The exterior is mainly brick, with a stone water table, stone corner quoining, sills and lintels, and stone entrance surrounds. Each section of the building houses three residential units, one on each floor.

The apartment block was probably built about 1908, when an occupancy permit was issued for its addresses. During this period there was a broad migration into the more residential areas of Dorchester from the densely populated neighborhoods of Boston's North and West Ends, and the city of Chelsea. Although a significant portion of this migration was Jewish, census records show that most of this building's early occupants were from a diversity of backgrounds, and it is not until a second wave of Jewish migration in the 1930s that its occupancy was mainly Jewish. Most of the occupants had middle-class occupations.

== See also ==
- National Register of Historic Places listings in southern Boston, Massachusetts
