= Greenville Street Historic District =

Historic district in Massachusetts, United States

- U.S. National Register of Historic Places
- U.S. Historic district
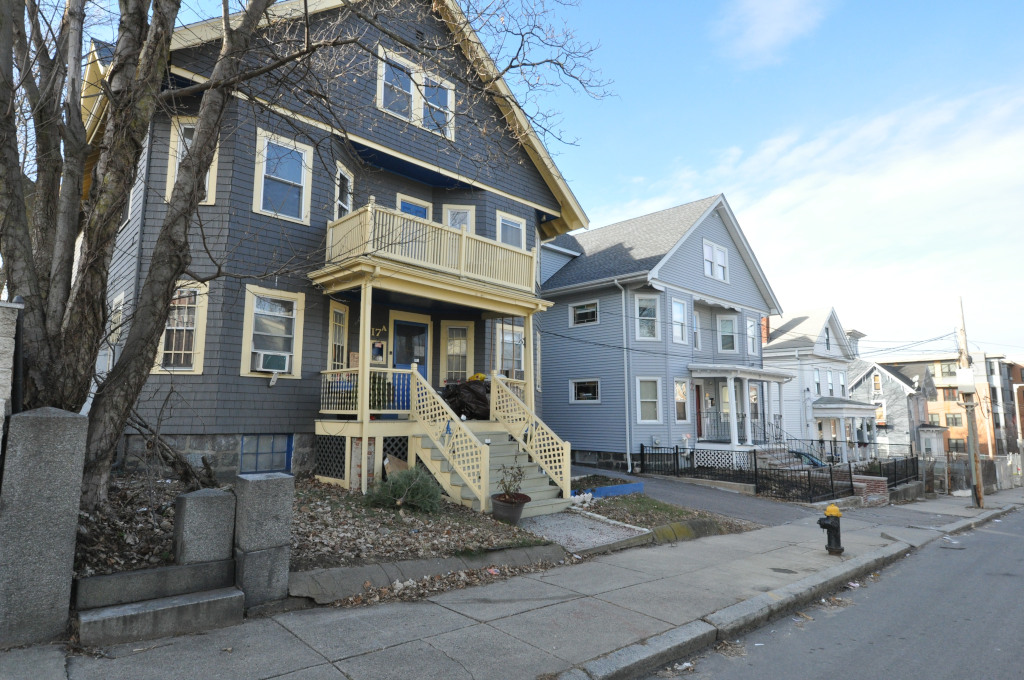

- Location within Massachusetts Location within the United States
- Location: 2, 6-25 Greenville St., Roxbury, Boston, Massachusetts
- Coordinates: 42°19′40″N 71°4′51″W
- NRHP reference No.: 100006134
- Added to NRHP: February 11, 2021

The Greenville Street Historic District is a historic district encompassing a primarily residential property in the Roxbury neighborhood of Boston, Massachusetts. Extending along Greenville Street, the district includes a diversity of architecture, and is prominent for significant urban renewal efforts conducted in the city in the 1960s and 1970s. The district was added to the National Register of Historic Places in 2021.

== Description and history ==
Greenville Street is located a short way east of Roxbury's Nubian Square, extending southward from Dudley Street to Winthrop Street. The street is lined primarily by residential properties of differing types, including wood frame single and multi-family buildings, and masonry apartment houses whose construction periods date from the mid-19th century to the late 20th century.

The area that is now Greenville Street was farmland until about 1833, when it was purchased by a developer and subdivided for residential construction. Development did not begin until the 1840s, which is when the oldest surviving houses on the street were built. The area benefited from the annexation of Roxbury to Boston in 1868, and the rise of Dudley Square (now Nubian Square) as a major commercial center and transit hub for the city's expanding streetcar network. The area was at first primarily populated by white immigrant and non-immigrant populations, but became increasingly African-American in the years after World War II. Racist federal government housing policies resulted in disinvestment by property owners, which eventually prompted urban renewal efforts in the area. Lawrenceville Associates, founded in 1971 by Denis Blackett, a former member of the Boston Redevelopment Authority, spearheaded efforts in this area, rehabilitating two properties (21-23 and 22-24 Greenville) and building 12-16 and 19 Greenville around the same time, all intended as low-income housing.

== See also ==
- National Register of Historic Places listings in southern Boston, Massachusetts
