= Frances and Isabella Apartments =

- U.S. National Register of Historic Places
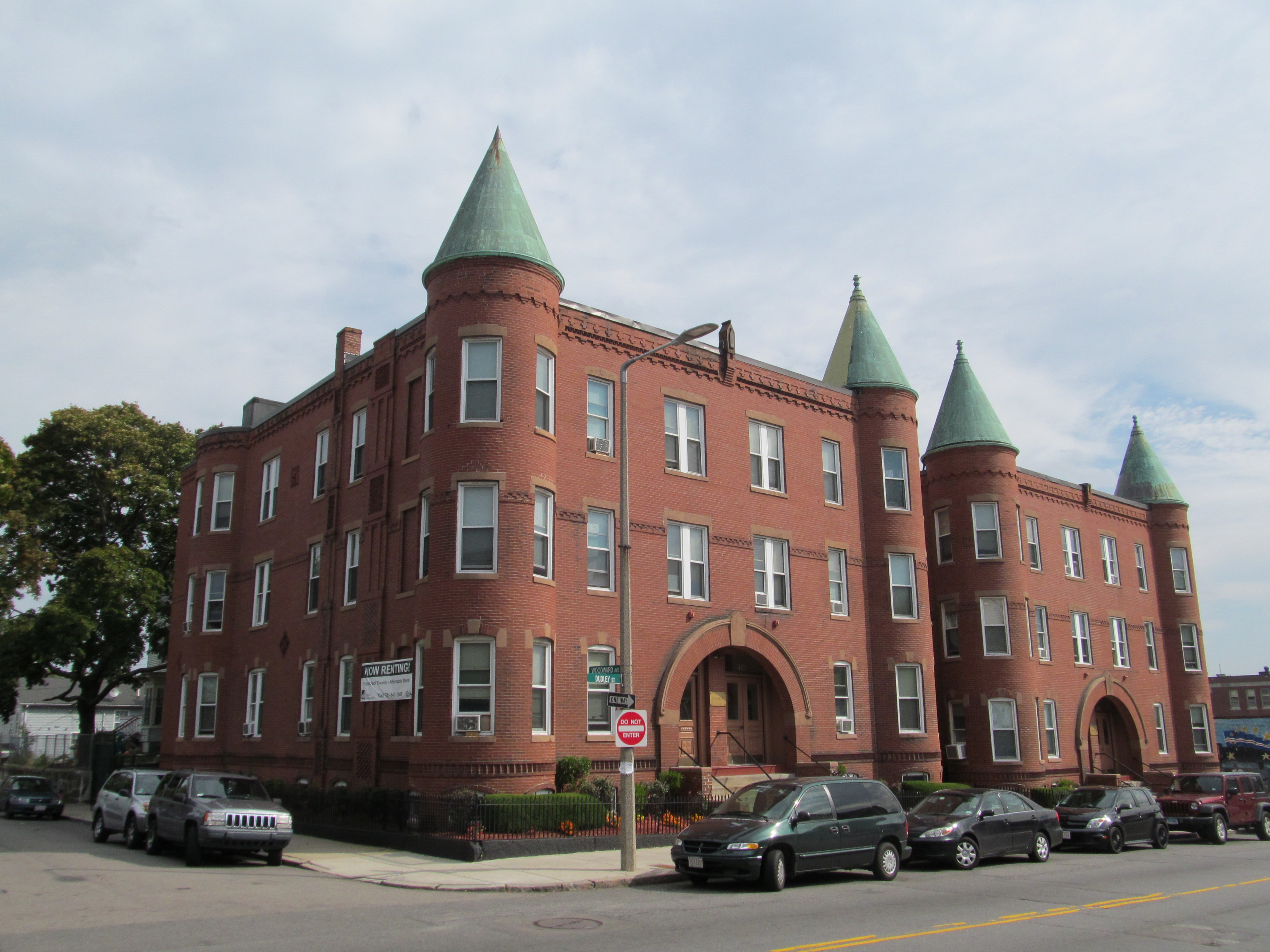
- Frances and Isabella Apartments

- Location within Massachusetts Location within the United States
- Location: Boston, Massachusetts
- Coordinates: 42°19′27″N 71°4′29″W
- Built: 1887; 139 years ago
- Architect: Goldsmith, Jacob & Co.
- Architectural style: Queen Anne
- NRHP reference No.: 02000081
- Added to NRHP: February 22, 2002

The Frances and Isabella Apartments are historic apartments at 430-432 and 434-436 Dudley Street in Boston, Massachusetts. They are a pair of three-story brick buildings, with distinctive corner towers with conical roofs, built with Queen Anne styling in 1887. Originally with two apartments per floor, they were subdivided further in 1952, and converted to lodging rooms in 1981. In the early 2000s the floor plan was again altered, to more closely resemble the 1952 plan.

The apartments were listed on the National Register of Historic Places in 2002.

== See also ==
- National Register of Historic Places listings in southern Boston, Massachusetts
