= Intervale Street-Columbia Road Historic District =

Historic district in Massachusetts, United States

- U.S. National Register of Historic Places
- U.S. Historic district
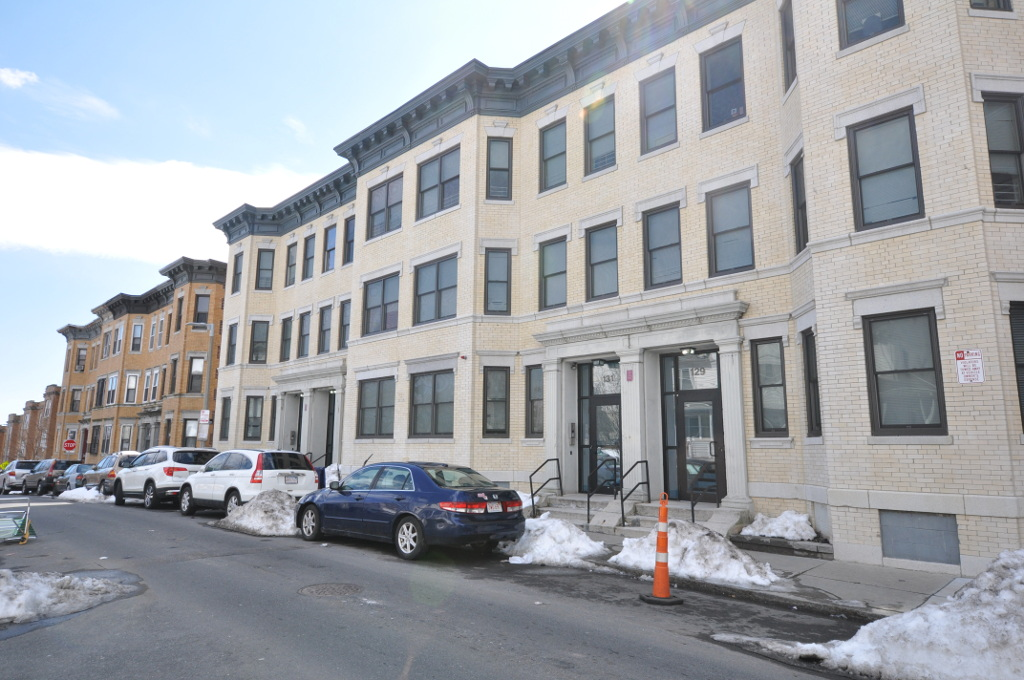

- Location within Massachusetts Location within the United States
- Location: 117-121, 123-127, 129-135, 137-143, 145-159, 161, 162 Intervale St. & 282-284, 286-288 Columbia Rd., Boston, Massachusetts
- Coordinates: 42°18′35″N 71°4′32″W
- Built: c. 1910-20
- Architect: Multiple
- Architectural style: Colonial Revival
- NRHP reference No.: 100003470
- Added to NRHP: February 28, 2019

The Intervale Street-Columbia Road Historic District is a historic district encompassing a small residential area in the Dorchester neighborhood of Boston, Massachusetts. Centered on a stretch of Intervale Street, the area was developed in the early 20th century during a major Jewish migration, and includes a fine sample of Colonial Revival architecture. The district was listed on the National Register of Historic Places in 2019.

== Description and history ==
Intervale Street is located in the central Dorchester area known as Grove Hall, extending roughly westward from Columbia Road toward Blue Hill Avenue. It is lined almost entirely with residential construction, with a portion of Ceylon Park, a public park, abutting it near its northeastern corner. The south side of the street, near its eastern end, is the location of the historic district, which also includes two buildings on the north side at the corner of Columbia Road. These buildings are all three stories in height, with brick construction in the Colonial Revival style trimmed in stone. Typical construction includes projecting polygonal bays, with sash windows topped by shouldered lintels, and entrances framed by columns and pediments.

The Intervale Street area had originally been developed in the 19th century with a series of wood-frame residences. Beginning about 1910, a major migration of Jews from Boston's North End and the adjacent city of Chelsea began, spurred by the extension of electrified streetcar service, and a major 1908 fire in Chelsea which left more than 15,000 Jews homeless. This area was walking distance to a synagogue built at Crawford Street in Roxbury in 1915, which became one of the major centers of Jewish life in Boston in the first half of the 20th century.

== See also ==
- National Register of Historic Places listings in southern Boston, Massachusetts
