= Home for Destitute Jewish Children =

- U.S. National Register of Historic Places
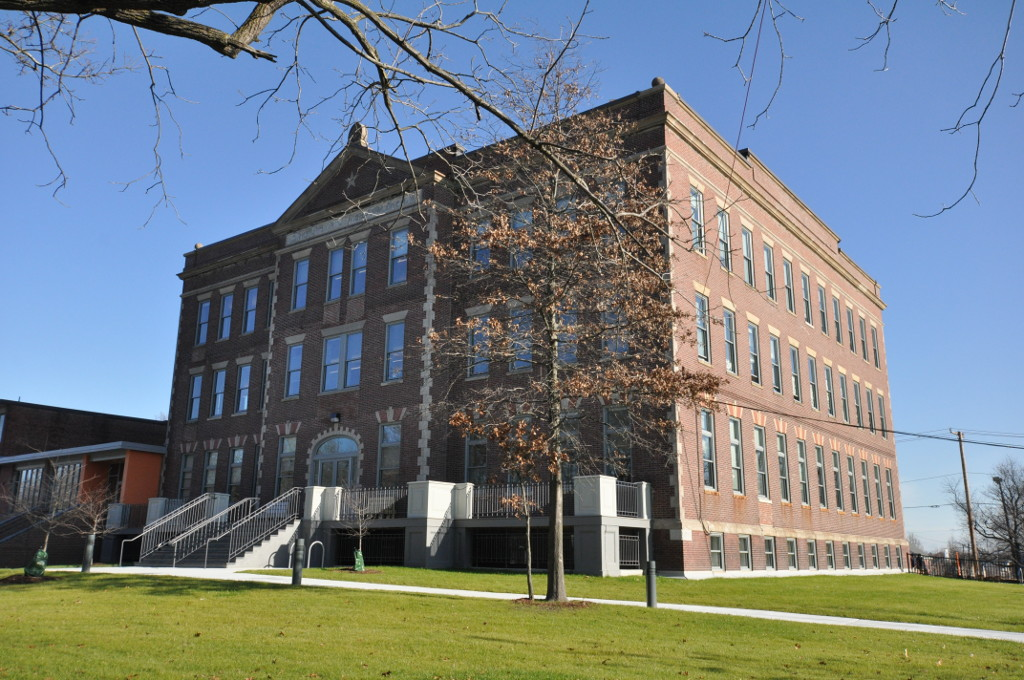

- Location within Massachusetts Location within the United States
- Location: 150-156 American Legion Hwy., Boston, Massachusetts
- Coordinates: 42°17′41″N 71°5′34″W
- Built: 1911
- Architect: John A. Hasty
- Architectural style: Classical Revival
- NRHP reference No.: 14000840
- Added to NRHP: October 8, 2014

The Home for Destitute Jewish Children is a historic orphanage at 150-156 American Legion Highway in the Dorchester neighborhood of Boston, Massachusetts. It is a three-story Classical Revival brick structure, designed by John A. Hasty and built in 1911. Local Jewish congregations formed the Ladies Helping Hand Auxiliary of the Home for Jewish Children in 1908, which raised the funds to build the orphanage as a replacement for a smaller facility in Roxbury. In 1934 the orphanage was moved to a new facility in Brighton, and this property was sold to another nonprofit which became known later as the Hecht Neighborhood House, which acted as a community center, providing a variety of meeting, classroom, and activity spaces to the area's Jewish community. Hecht House merged with the Young Men's Hebrew Association in 1959. The YMHA-Hecht House sold the property in 1970 to another local community group, the Lena Park Community Development Corporation, which continued to operate it has a community center.

The building was listed on the National Register of Historic Places in 2014.

== See also ==
- National Register of Historic Places listings in southern Boston, Massachusetts
