= Fowler-Clark-Epstein Farmstead =

Historic house in Massachusetts, United States

- U.S. National Register of Historic Places
- Location within Massachusetts Location within the United States
- Location: 487 Norfolk St., Mattapan, Boston, Massachusetts
- Coordinates: 42°16′47″N 71°5′20″W
- Area: less than one acre
- Built: c. 1786
- Architectural style: Georgian
- NRHP reference No.: 100005089
- Added to NRHP: March 16, 2020

The Fowler-Clark-Epstein Farmstead is a historic house and farm complex at 487 Norfolk Street in Boston, Massachusetts. Possibly built sometime between 1786 and 1806, the house on the property is one of the city's oldest surviving farmhouses. It was listed on the National Register of Historic Places in 2020. It is now home to the Urban Farm Institute, a local nonprofit organization.

== Description and history ==
The Fowler-Clark-Epstein Farmstead stands on about one-half acre in what is now a predominantly residential area of northern Mattapan, at the southwest corner of Norfolk and Hosmer Streets. The farmstead includes the main house and a carriage house/barn, set further back from the street than the surrounding later construction. The main house is a 2 1/2-story frame structure, with a gabled roof, central chimney, and clapboarded exterior. Its main facade is five bays wide, with projecting gabled entry vestibule sheltering its center entrance. Single-story additions extend to one side and the rear. The interior follows a typical center-chimney plan, with a narrow staircase winding around the chimney stack, and rooms on either side of the chimney.

The house's construction date is uncertain. The land on which it stands was inherited by Samuel Fowler in 1786, at which time it only had a barn standing. By 1806, when he died, the property included a "mantion house", which was either built or moved there. Boston has only four documented surviving farmhouses built before 1806. An 11-acre parcel including the house was purchased in 1837 by Mary Clark, whose family probably built the extant carriage house/barn in the 1850s. The Clarke family retained ownership until 1940, and in 1941 the property was purchased by Jorge and Ida Epstein. The Epstein family retained ownership until 2015, when it was acquired by Historic Boston, a preservation nonprofit. Most of the land of the farm was subdivided and sold of by the early 20th century.

== See also ==
- National Register of Historic Places listings in southern Boston, Massachusetts
