= Columbia Road-Strathcona Road Historic District =

Historic district in Massachusetts, United States

- Columbia Road–Strathcona Road Historic District
- U.S. National Register of Historic Places
- U.S. Historic district
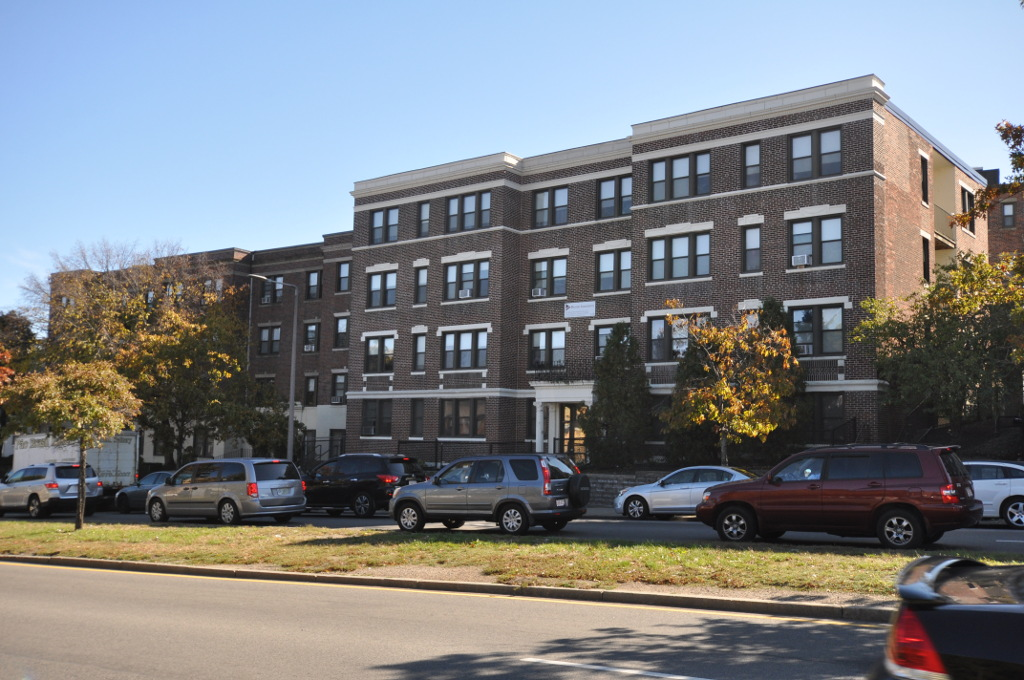

- Location within Massachusetts Location within the United States
- Location: 90-94,102-108, 105-111, 129-135, 137, 143-147, 150-156 Columbia & 16 Strathcona Rds., 114-126 Washington St., Roxbury, Boston, Massachusetts
- Coordinates: 42°18′21″N 71°4′46″W
- Architect: Multiple
- NRHP reference No.: 100002734
- Added to NRHP: August 3, 2018

The Columbia Road–Strathcona Road Historic District encompasses a collection of brick residential apartment houses on Columbia and Strathcona Roads in the Roxbury neighborhood of Boston, Massachusetts. Arrayed on the southeast side of Columbia Road between Washington and Brinsley Streets are several multistory buildings with well-preserved Colonial Revival features. They were constructed in the first two decades of the 20th century, when the area was developed as a streetcar suburb. These were built mainly by Jewish developers Saul E. Moffie and Samuel Levy to serve a growing Jewish population in the area.

The district was listed on the National Register of Historic Places in 2017.

== See also ==
- National Register of Historic Places listings in southern Boston, Massachusetts
