= House at 17 Cranston Street =

Historic house in Massachusetts, United States

- U.S. National Register of Historic Places
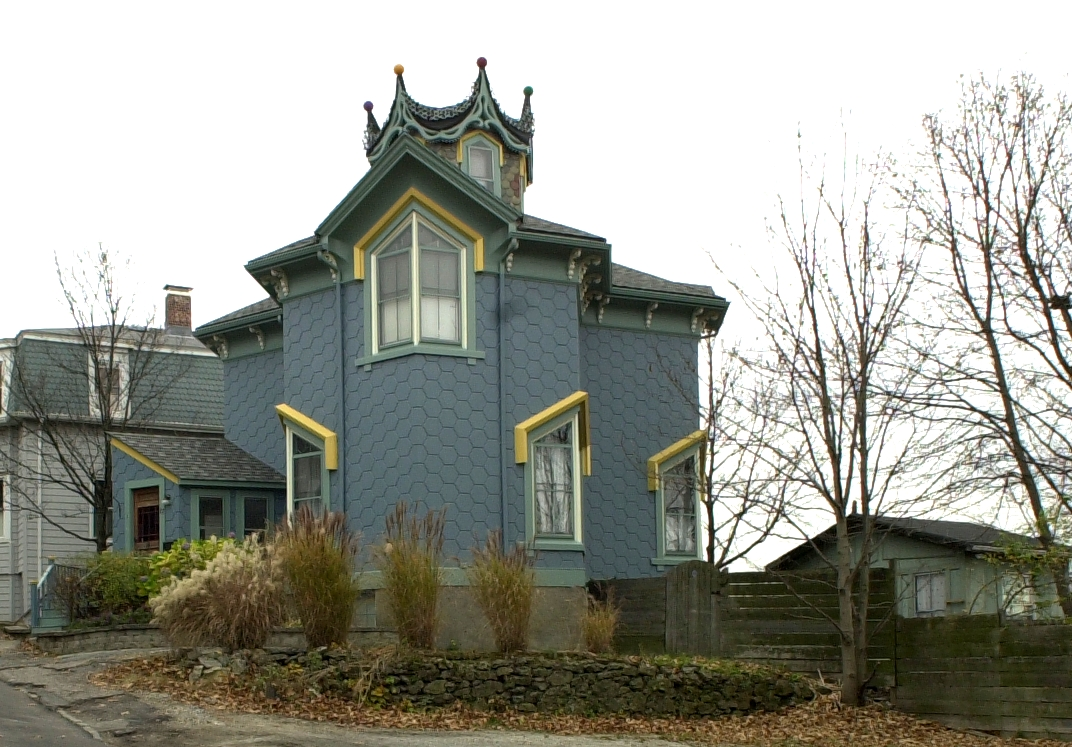

- Location within Massachusetts Location within the United States
- Location: 17 Cranston St., Boston, Massachusetts
- Coordinates: 42°19′15.6″N 71°6′33.9″W
- Area: less than one acre
- Built: 1871
- Architect: Archibald, Scott
- Architectural style: Italianate
- NRHP reference No.: 87001398
- Added to NRHP: November 20, 1987

The House at 17 Cranston Street in the Jamaica Plain neighborhood of Boston, Massachusetts, is an architecturally eclectic and distinctive 12-sided structure, with an unusual combination of Italianate and Gothic features. It was built around 1874 by two Scottish immigrants, and is a distinctive landmark overlooking Hyde Square. It was listed on the United States National Register of Historic Places in 1987.

== Description and history ==
17 Cranston Street stands on top of a low ridge southeast of the Hyde Square junction of Centre and Perkins Streets in Jamaica Plain. The main structure consists of three four-sided bays resembling truncated hexagons, which have been joined in a Y shape around a central hexagon. Windows consist of paired casements, each set at one of the angled corners with a triangular colored transom, giving the pair the appearance of a peaked transom. Each window pair is framed by shouldered Italianate moulding. The windows are arranged so there is only one pair per corner, either on the first or second floor. In two places on the ground floor there are doors placed at a corner, which fold as well as open. Each of these has been covered by a later added vestibule, whose exterior continues the main body styling but houses a more standard door. The exterior is finished in overlapping wooden panels that are in a hexagonal pattern. A six-sided cupola rises at the center of the roof, its exterior finished in multicolored slate. The interior decoration continues the hexagonal themes of the exterior.

The land on which the house stands was purchased by James and Archibald Scott from developer Timothy Bowe in 1871. The Scotts lost the property by foreclosure in 1874. The house was probably built by the Scotts: Archibald, a native of Nova Scotia, was a carpenter, specialized in the organ building trade, while Bowe was a mason, none of whose nearby houses come close to this one in architectural interest. According to a 1908 article on the house, the Scott brothers camped in a tent on the property while building the house.

After the Scotts lost the property, it went through a number of absentee owners. In the 20th century, the vestibules were added, and the house was sheathed in asphalt siding, which was placed over the hexagonal tiles. Subsequent owners have removed the siding, exposing the original, which was judged in 1987 to be in good condition.

On February 20, 2025, a fire broke out at the house, causing some damage to the roof.

== See also ==
- National Register of Historic Places listings in southern Boston, Massachusetts
