= Columbia Road–Devon Street Historic District =

Historic district in Massachusetts, United States

- U.S. National Register of Historic Places
- U.S. Historic district
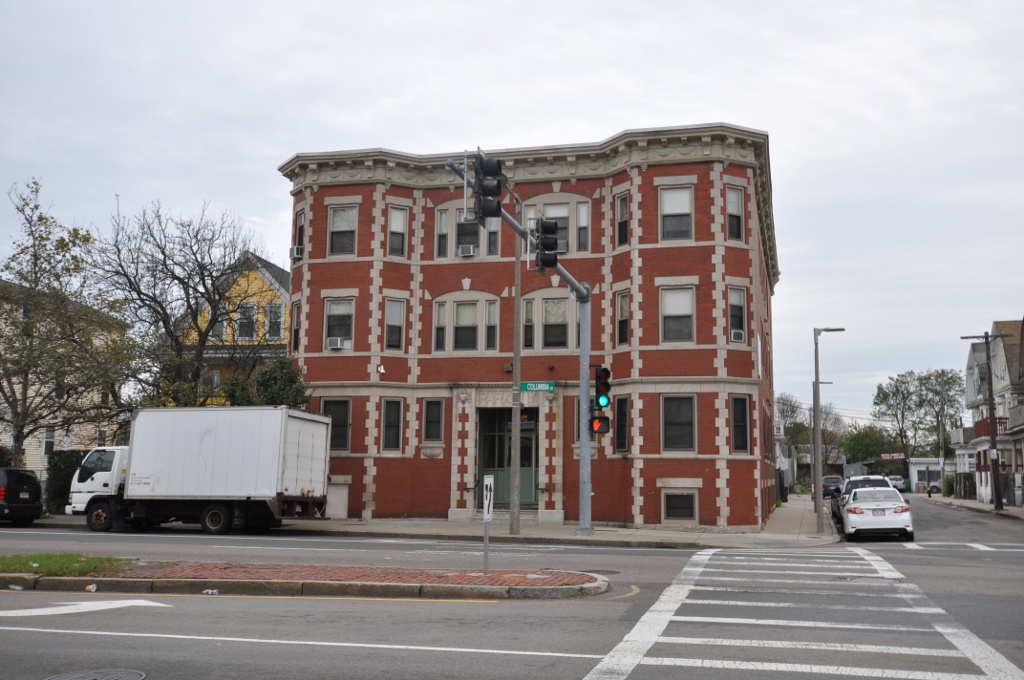

- Location within Massachusetts Location within the United States
- Location: 193-231 (odd) & 200-204 (even) Columbia Rd. Dorchester, Boston, Massachusetts
- Coordinates: 42°18′25″N 71°4′35″W
- Architect: Multiple
- NRHP reference No.: 100001315
- Added to NRHP: July 17, 2017

The Columbia Road–Devon Street Historic District encompasses a collection of brick residential apartment houses on Columbia Road in the Dorchester neighborhood of Boston, Massachusetts. Arrayed on the southeast side of the road near its junction with Devon Street are seven multistory buildings, constructed in the first two decades of the 20th century, when the area was developed as a streetcar suburb. An eighth building from the same period is located on the northwest side at the junction with Stanwood Street. These apartment blocks are typical of the speculative housing built at the time, with most of them built out of red brick laid in Flemish bond, with cast stone trim.

The district was listed on the National Register of Historic Places in 2017.

== See also ==
- National Register of Historic Places listings in southern Boston, Massachusetts
