= Sherman Apartments Historic District =

Historic district in Massachusetts, United States

- U.S. National Register of Historic Places
- U.S. Historic district
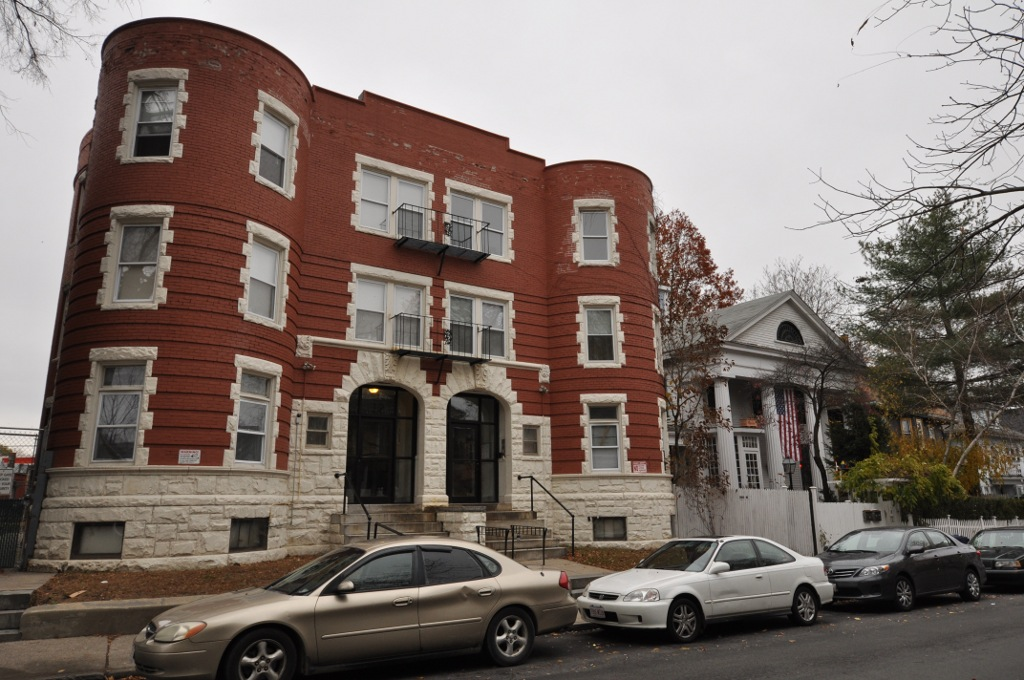
- District buildings on Lyndhurst Street

- Location within Massachusetts Location within the United States
- Location: 544-546 Washington, 4-6, 12-14, 18 Lyndhurst Sts., Dorchester, Boston, Massachusetts
- Coordinates: 42°17′32″N 71°4′17″W
- Built: 1831
- Architectural style: Classical Revival; Greek Revival
- NRHP reference No.: 12000978
- Added to NRHP: November 28, 2012

The Sherman Apartments Historic District encompasses four historic residential buildings on Washington and Lyndhurst Streets in the Dorchester neighborhood of Boston, Massachusetts. The district consists of three brick six-unit buildings constructed between 1904 and 1906 by Walter U. Sherman. They were built on the site of an 1831 Greek Revival school building, which was moved by Sherman to 18 Lyndhurst Street and converted into a residential duplex. The three brick buildings are three story Classical Revival structures with modest external decoration.

The buildings were listed on the National Register of Historic Places in 2013.

== See also ==
- National Register of Historic Places listings in southern Boston, Massachusetts
