= Almont Apartments =

- U.S. National Register of Historic Places
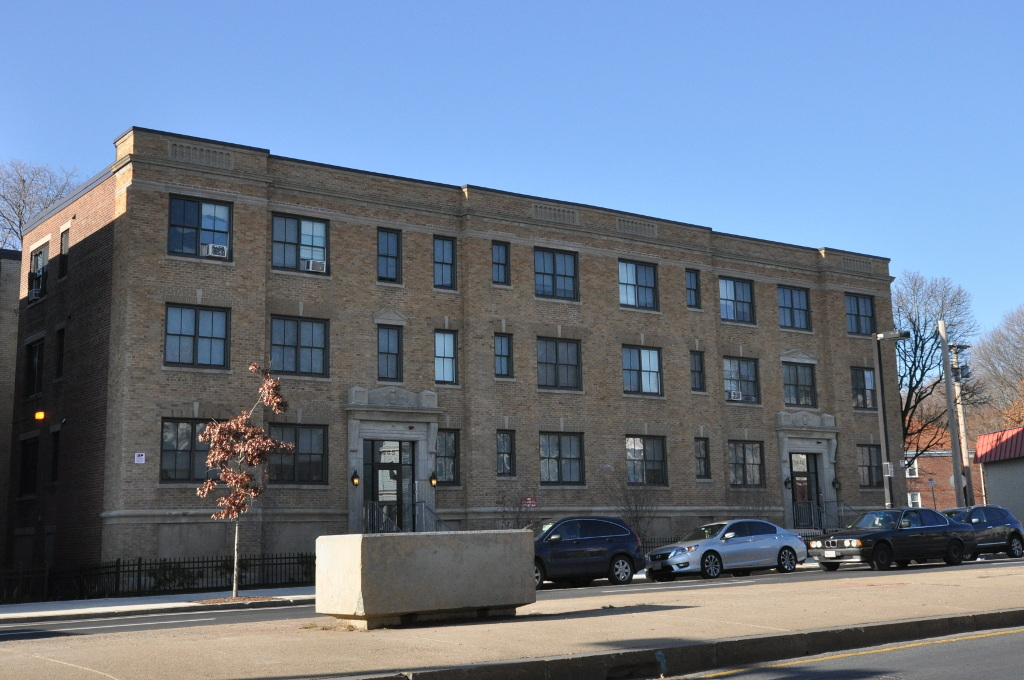

- Location within Massachusetts
- Location: 1439-1451 Blue Hill Avenue, Boston, Massachusetts
- Coordinates: 42°16′29″N 71°5′38″W
- Area: less than one acre
- Built: 1926
- Architect: Saul E. Moffie
- Architectural style: Colonial Revival
- NRHP reference No.: 14000698
- Added to NRHP: September 22, 2014

The Almont Apartments are historic apartment houses at 1439-43 and 1447-51 Blue Hill Avenue in the Mattapan neighborhood of Boston, Massachusetts. Built in 1926, they are well-preserved examples of Colonial Revival architecture, built during a period of growth fueled by the city's expanding streetcar network. The apartments were listed on the National Register of Historic Places in 2014.

== Description and history ==
The Almont Apartments are located in central southern Mattapan, on the west side of Blue Hill Avenue, occupying the block between Almont and Tennis Streets. They are two three-story brick buildings with flat roofs and Colonial Revival styling. Each building is U-shaped, with a small courtyard at the rear of the building. Due to the angled entry of the side streets, each presents a stepped facade to the outer side, and a flat facade to the front. The facades are roughly divided into three sections, with outer and center sections projecting slightly, and the second and fourth sections housing the building entrances. The entrances are framed by cast concrete surrounds with bracketed pediments. Each building houses 24 units, each with one or two bedrooms.

These buildings were designed by Saul Moffie, a local architect, and built in 1926 to answer growing demand for housing in the area which had been fueled by the expansion of the streetcar network along Blue Hill Avenue. Most of the growth was in the Jewish population, which was migrating to the area from locations closer to Boston's financial district. This migration made Mattapan a major center of Jewish culture until the 1940s, when a further migration to Brookline and Newton led to its decline in that role. The Almont Apartments had predominantly Jewish-surnamed residents until about 1960.

== See also ==
- National Register of Historic Places listings in southern Boston, Massachusetts
