= Walton and Roslin Halls =

- U.S. National Register of Historic Places
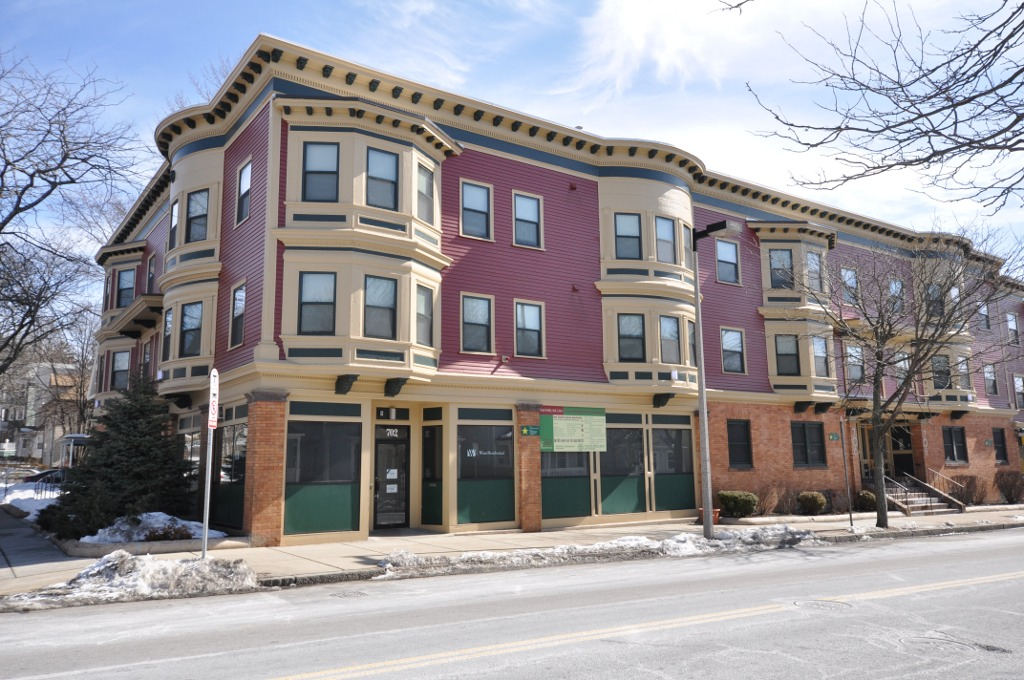

- Location within Massachusetts Location within the United States
- Location: 702-708 & 710-726 Washington St., 3-5 Walton St., Dorchester, Boston, Massachusetts
- Coordinates: 42°17′13″N 71°4′16″W
- Built: 1897
- Architect: Cornelius A. Russell
- Architectural style: Classical Revival
- NRHP reference No.: 12000978
- Added to NRHP: December 18, 2013

Walton and Roslin Halls is a mixed-used commercial and residential building that was built in two parts. They are located at the corner of Washington and Walton Streets in the Dorchester neighborhood of Boston, Massachusetts, and extend south along Washington Street. The first of the two buildings, that at 3-5 Walton Street and 702-708 Washington, is a three-story brick and wood-frame structure built in 1897 to a design by Cornelius A. Russell; the southern portion was completed a year later. The building housed a commercial space on the ground floor, and residential units above.

The building, which was one of the first of its type built south of Codman Square, was listed on the National Register of Historic Places in 2013.

== See also ==
- National Register of Historic Places listings in southern Boston, Massachusetts
