= Timothy Hoxie House =

Historic house in Massachusetts, United States

- U.S. National Register of Historic Places
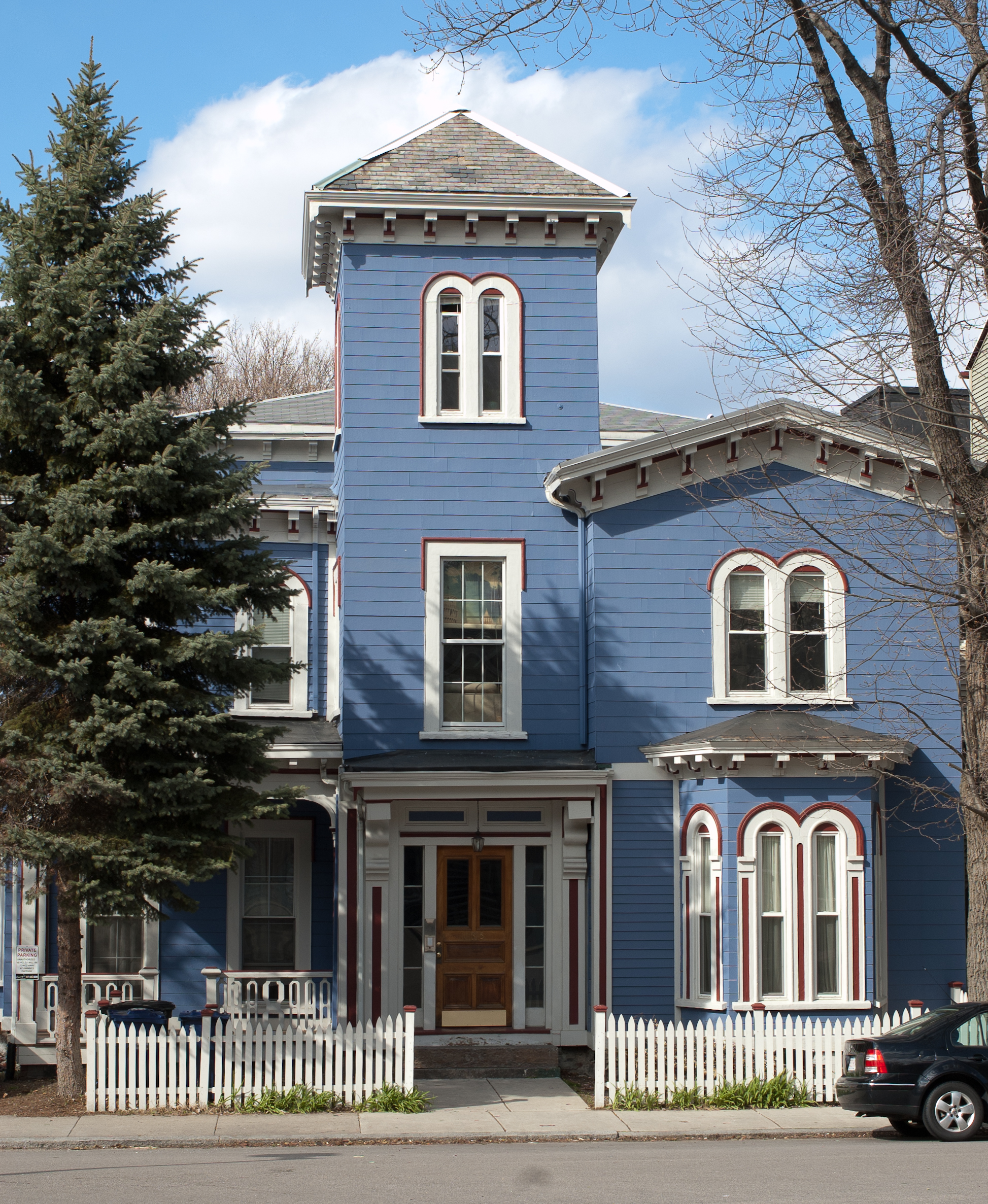

- Location within Massachusetts Location within the United States
- Location: 135 Hillside Street, Boston, Massachusetts
- Coordinates: 42°19′52.4″N 71°6′19.6″W
- Built: 1854
- Architectural style: Italianate
- NRHP reference No.: 87001399
- Added to NRHP: November 20, 1987

The Timothy Hoxie House is a historic house in Boston, Massachusetts. This two-story wood-frame house was built in 1854, and is a locally distinctive example of Italianate architecture. It is three bays wide, with each bay a distinct projection from the main block. The central bay is a projecting three-story tower with a hip roof whose cornice is studded with brackets. The right bay has a gable end projection that protrudes even forward of the tower, with a polygonal bay on the first floor and paired round-arch windows on the second. The left bay has a lesser projection, with a shed-roofed porch in front.

The house was purchased for restoration in 1975 by brothers Ronald & Randall Finigan. Ronald Finigan and his family lived in the house until its sale in 2002. Finigan is credited for having restored the property and having the home listed on the National Register of Historic Places in 1987.

== See also ==
- National Register of Historic Places listings in southern Boston, Massachusetts
