= Thane Street Historic District =

Historic district in Massachusetts, United States

- U.S. National Register of Historic Places
- U.S. Historic district
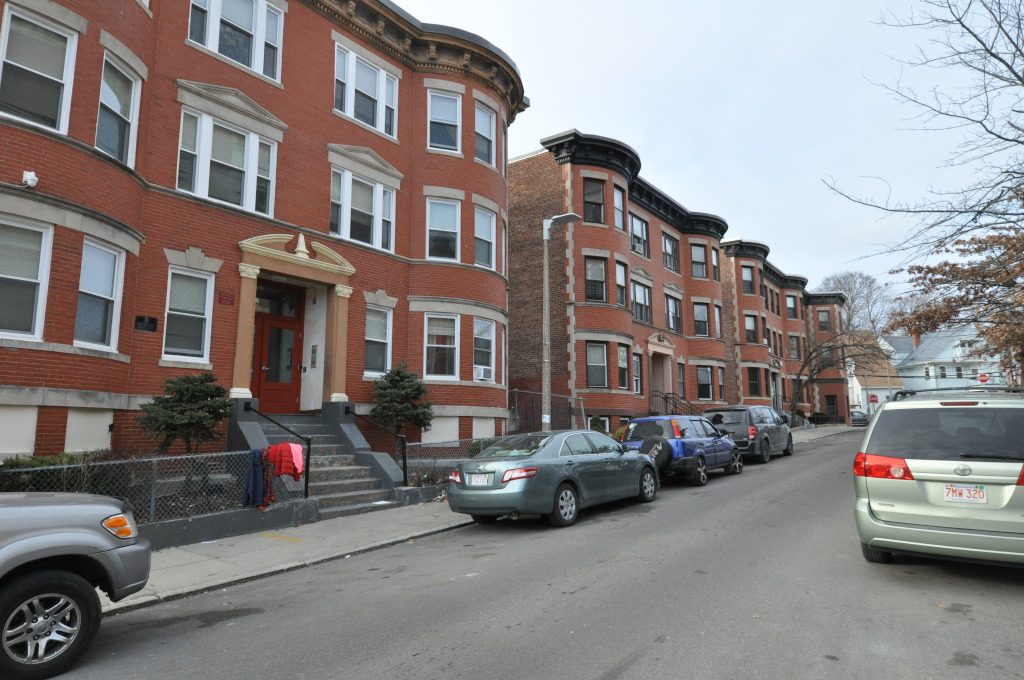

- Location within Massachusetts Location within the United States
- Location: 70-78 Harvard St, 22-24, 26-28, 30-32 Thane St., Boston, Massachusetts
- Coordinates: 42°17′49″N 71°4′35″W
- Area: less than one acre
- Built: 1910
- Architect: Multiple
- Architectural style: Colonial Revival
- NRHP reference No.: 100005782
- Added to NRHP: November 13, 2020

The Thane Street Historic District is a historic district encompassing a group of apartment houses in the Dorchester neighborhood of Boston, Massachusetts. Extending along Thane Street from Harvard Street, the area was developed in 1910, during a major Jewish migration, and includes a fine sample of Colonial Revival architecture. The district was listed on the National Register of Historic Places in 2020.

== Description and history ==
Thane Street is located in central Dorchester, extending roughly south from Harvard Street toward the Codman Square area. The historic district encompasses three brick apartment houses extending from the Harvard Street corner south along the west side of Thane Street. All are three stories in height, with stone foundations, flat roofs, and a shallow setback from the sidewalk. 22-24 and 26-28 Thane Street are virtually identical, with four-bay facades that have rounded bays at the outside, and a recessed entrance with elaborate surround at the center. 30-32 Thane Street is wider, with frontage and an entrance on Harvard Street, as well as a polygonal projecting bay at the street corner.

The Thane Street area was a sparsely developed area with a few single-family residences prior to 1910, when Thane Street was laid out. The Dorchester area had become the destination of a major migration of Jews from Boston's North End and the adjacent city of Chelsea, spurred by the extension of electrified streetcar service, and a major 1908 fire in Chelsea which left more than 15,000 Jews homeless. These three buildings were construction by Louis Silverman and Isaac Shapiro on land purchased from the Carlton family. 30-32 Thane Street was originally built as a mixed-use property, with retail space on the ground floor which has since been converted to residential use. The Jewish population migrated out of the area in the 1950s, accompanied by an influx of African Americans to the area. The Thane Street area was the subject of an early urban housing development program of the city of Boston in the 1960s known as the Model City program.

== See also ==
- National Register of Historic Places listings in southern Boston, Massachusetts
