= Crawford Street Historic District =

Historic district in Massachusetts, United States

- U.S. National Register of Historic Places
- U.S. Historic district
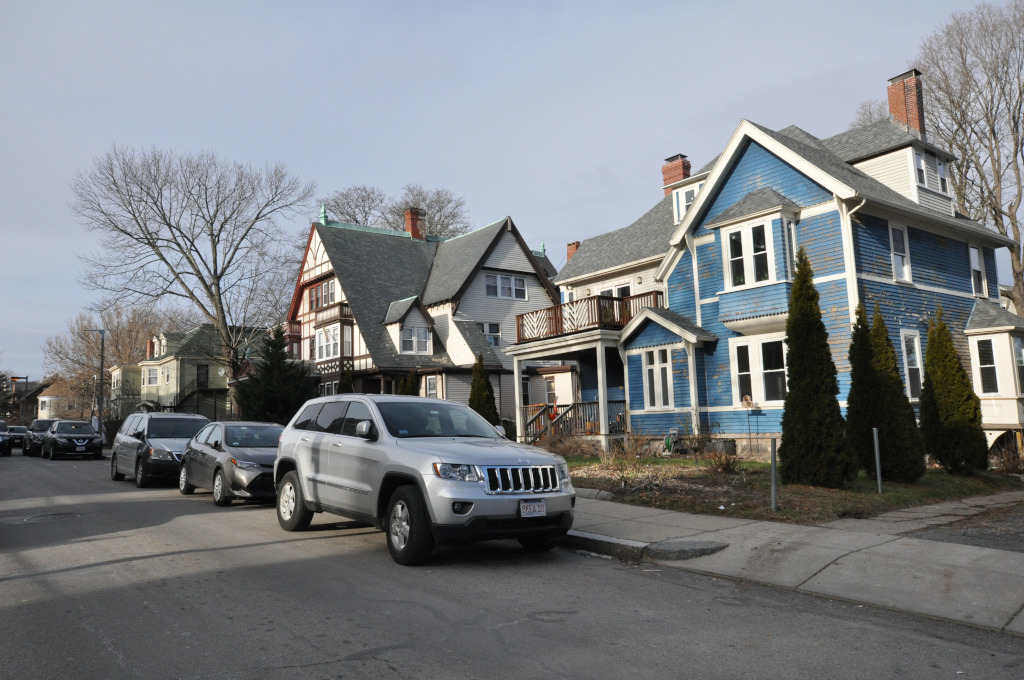

- Location within Massachusetts Location within the United States
- Location: 5-38 Crawford St., 42 Elm Hill Ave., 621 Warren St., Roxbury, Boston, Massachusetts
- Coordinates: 42°18′40″N 71°5′6″W
- Area: 4.7 acres (1.9 ha)
- NRHP reference No.: 100005798
- Added to NRHP: November 18, 2020

The Crawford Street Historic District encompasses a collection of primarily residential apartment houses on Crawford Street between Elm Hill Avenue and Warren Street in the Roxbury neighborhood of Boston, Massachusetts, united States. The area was developed in the late 19th and early 20th centuries, and features well-preserved wood frame single and multi-family residences from that period, as well as the city's only extant Brutalist style branch library building. The district was listed on the National Register of Historic Places in 2020.

== Description and history ==
Crawford Street is located in southern Roxbury, extending west from Warren Street. Its easternmost block was originally part of the Elm Hill country estate, and was subdivided for development in the 1870s. During this period, Roxbury (annexed to Boston in 1868) experienced rapid growth as a streetcar suburb. Early construction was of larger wood-frame houses with typical late Victorian styling, while later additions included multi-family houses and an apartment block at the corner of Crawford and Elm Hill Avenue. The area's early residents were generally from older New England families, and there was an influx of Jewish households in the 1910s and 1920s. In the mid-20th century the area became predominantly African-American. Emblematic of this change in demographics was the conversion of a former Hebrew College building to Freedom House, a social and community center focused on improving the conditions for African-Americans in Roxbury. As part of a redevelopment effort supported by the city and Freedom House, the city built the Brutalist Grove Hall branch library at the corner of Warren and Crawford Streets. This building was closed as a library in 2009 and was subsequently acquired by Freedom House.

== See also ==
- National Register of Historic Places listings in southern Boston, Massachusetts
