= Ascension-Caproni Historic District =

Historic district in Massachusetts, United States

- U.S. National Register of Historic Places
- U.S. Historic district
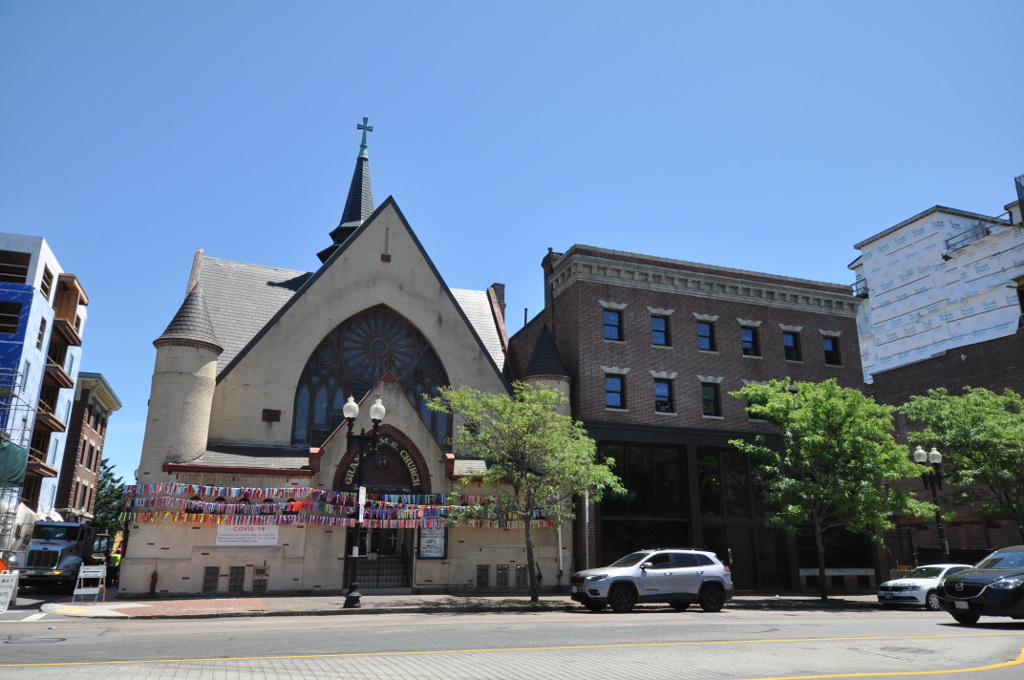
- The former Church of the Ascension (left) and the PP Caproni & Brother Showrooms (right)

- Location within Massachusetts Location within the United States
- Location: Roughly bounded by Washington St., Newcomb St, Thorndike St. & Reed St. Roxbury, Boston, Massachusetts
- Coordinates: 42°20′2″N 71°4′44″W
- Area: 5 acres (2.0 ha)
- Architect: Multiple
- NRHP reference No.: 100004335
- Added to NRHP: December 23, 2019

The Ascension-Caproni Historic District encompasses a mixed collection of late 19th and early 20th century architecture along Washington, Newcomb, and Thorndike Streets in the Roxbury neighborhood of Boston, Massachusetts. Including religious, residential, commercial, and industrial buildings, it encapsulates the area's transition from industrial to residential uses between about 1850 and 1930. The district was listed on the National Register of Historic Places in 2019.

== Description and history ==
The Ascension-Caproni Historic District is located in Boston's Lower Roxbury area, extending along the south side of Washington Street between East Lenox Street and Thorndike Street, and along Newcomb and Thorndike Streets. It covers about 5 acres (2.0 ha), and includes architecture diverse by function and style. Of the ten buildings in the district, the oldest are a group of three Italianate residences at 1900-1904 Washington Street. The former Church of the Ascension, now the Grant AME Church, is a locally unusual Gothic Revival building, built in 1892 out of yellow brick. Industrial buildings include the office, showroom, and studios of the Caproni Brothers Plaster Casting Company, a firm noted for its reproduction casts of classical Greek and Roman statuary, based on original museum pieces and exhibited in Symphony Hall, Boston among other locations.

The Lower Roxbury area was agricultural during the colonial period, and was first intensively developed in the mid-19th century as a mixed residential and industrial area, its housing serving workers at nearby factories. Introduction of streetcar service in the 1850s began a transition to more middle-class residential development. This came to an end with the Panic of 1873, and lower-class residential development came to dominate. The commercial Washington Street corridor in this district developed to serve that population, with the Church of the Ascension built to serve the large Irish immigrant population. Many rowhouses of the sort found in this district were demolished in urban renewal projects of the mid-to-late 20th century.

== See also ==
- National Register of Historic Places listings in southern Boston, Massachusetts
