= Cartoof & Sherman Apartments =

- U.S. National Register of Historic Places
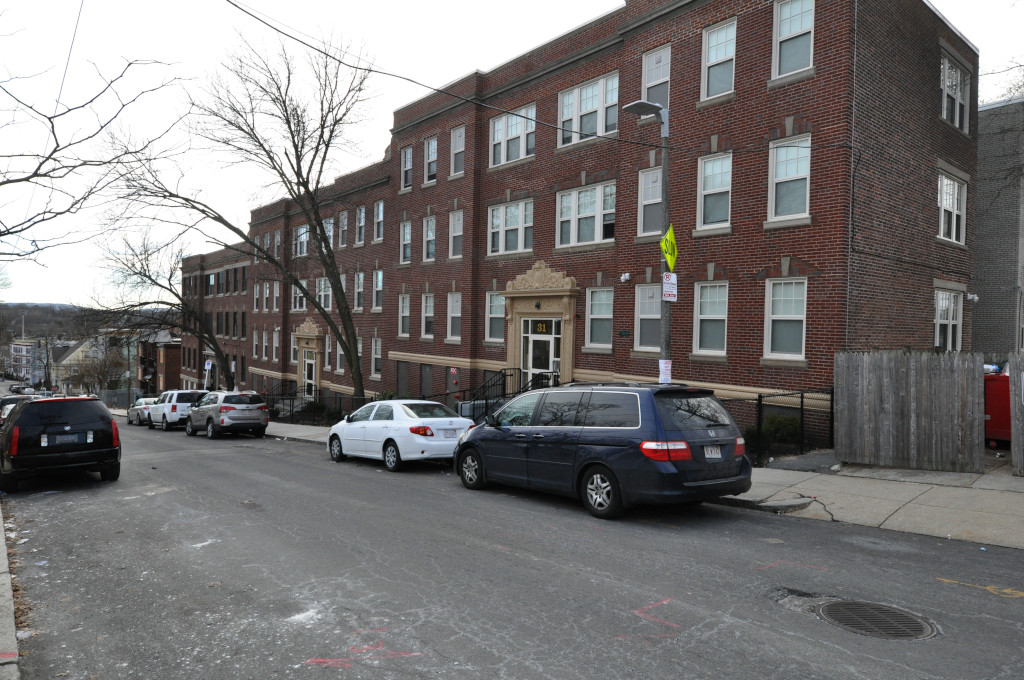

- Location within Massachusetts Location within the United States
- Location: 31-35 Wales St., Boston, Massachusetts
- Coordinates: 42°17′48″N 71°5′5″W
- Area: less than one acre
- Built: 1925
- Architect: Saul E. Moffie
- Architectural style: Colonial Revival
- NRHP reference No.: 100005763
- Added to NRHP: November 12, 2020

The Cartoof & Sherman Apartments are a group of three historic apartment houses at 31-35 Wales Street in the Dorchester neighborhood of Boston, Massachusetts. Built in 1925, they are well-preserved examples of Colonial Revival architecture, built during a period of growth fueled by the city's expanding streetcar network. The apartments were listed on the National Register of Historic Places in 2020.

== Description and history ==
The Cartoof & Sherman Apartments are located in central western Dorchester, on the south side of Wales Street between Harvard Street and Blue Hill Avenue. They consist of three virtually identical three-story apartment houses, built out of brick and stone, connected to one another by party walls. The buildings are set on sloping terrain, with a partially exposed basement level on each structure. A stone water table separates the basement level from the upper levels. Each building's facade has three slightly inset bays at the center, with the main building entrance in the center, framed by an elaborate stone surround. Windows have stone sills and keystones, with lintels that are otherwise brick. Each building houses twelve residential units.

These buildings were designed by Saul Moffie, a local architect, and built in 1925 to answer growing demand for housing in the area which had been fueled by the expansion of the streetcar network along Blue Hill Avenue. Much of this growth was due to Jewish migration from tenement areas of downtown Boston and Chelsea, with an exodus from the latter begun in the aftermath of a major fire in 1908. Moffie was a prominent and prolific local architect responsible for the design of more than seventy area apartment houses.

== See also ==
- National Register of Historic Places listings in southern Boston, Massachusetts
