= Charlotte Street-Esmond Street Historic District =

Historic district in Massachusetts, U.S.

- U.S. National Register of Historic Places
- U.S. Historic district
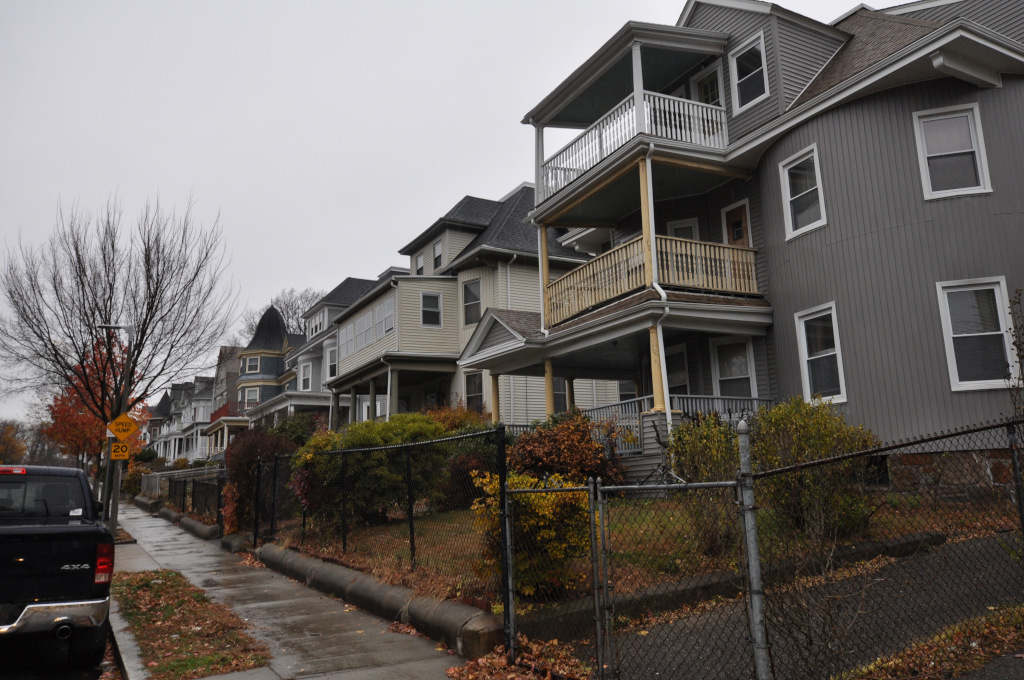

- Location within Massachusetts Location within the United States
- Location: 682-754 Blue Hill Ave., 50 and 64 Bradshaw, 12-62 Charlotte, 9-71 Esmond,12-16 and 206 McLellan Sts., Boston, Massachusetts
- Coordinates: 42°17′59″N 71°5′10″W
- Area: 3 acres (1.2 ha)
- Built: 1899
- Architect: Multiple
- Architectural style: Queen Anne; Colonial Revival
- NRHP reference No.: 100008419
- Added to NRHP: December 1, 2022

The Charlotte Street-Esmond Street Historic District is a historic district encompassing a residential subdivision in the Dorchester neighborhood of Boston, Massachusetts. Centered on Charlotte and Esmond Streets, the area was developed in the early 20th century following the arrival of electrified street cars on nearby Blue Hill Avenue. The district was listed on the National Register of Historic Places in 2022.

== Description and history ==
Charlotte and Esmond Streets form part of a residential area southeast of Boston's Franklin Park and east of Blue Hill Avenue. The historic district includes a diversity of single and multiple-family residential structures, all characterized by their construction in the early 20th century, and by a preponderance of architectural styling popular in that period. The only non-residential buildings in the district face Blue Hill Avenue, and include a commercial-residential building and the William Endicott School, a Colonial Revival edifice built in 1906.

Prior to its residential development, this area was largely rural, with farms and family country estates. The arrival of a horsecar line spurred some residential subdivision, but it was only when the line was electrified in the 1890s that serious development of these properties with denser residential housing began. The Charlotte-Esmond Street area was part of country estates owned by Thomas C. Wales and Elijah Williams, and was subdivided in the 1890s. The area was largely built out by 1920. It features a number of architect-designed houses, including no less than four which were occupied by the designer.

== See also ==
- National Register of Historic Places listings in southern Boston, Massachusetts
