= Camden Street Development Historic District =

Historic district in Massachusetts, United States

- U.S. National Register of Historic Places
- U.S. Historic district
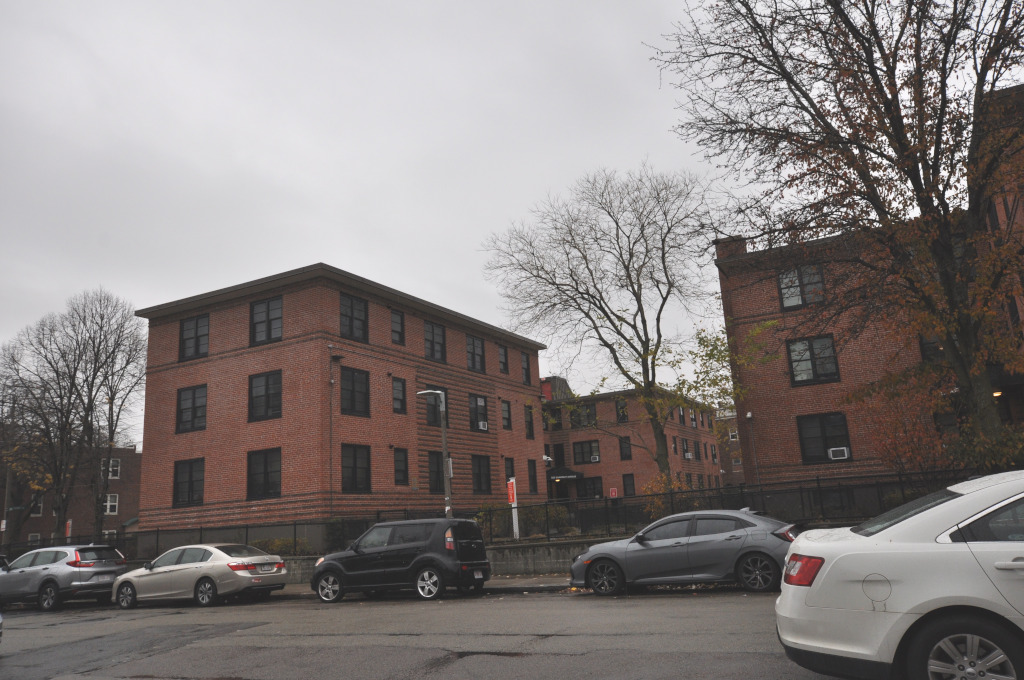

- Location within Massachusetts Location within the United States
- Location: 50-60 Camden St., 15-35 Brannon Harris Way, 575-585 Shawmut Ave., Boston, Massachusetts
- Coordinates: 42°20′11″N 71°4′46″W
- Area: 1.27 acres (0.51 ha)
- Built: 1949
- Architect: Gray, John
- Architectural style: Modernist
- NRHP reference No.: 100007727
- Added to NRHP: May 26, 2022

The Camden Street Development Historic District is a historic district encompassing a cluster of municipally owned residential apartment blocks in the Roxbury neighborhood of Boston, Massachusetts. It consists of three nearly identical buildings centered on Shawmut Avenue between Camden Street and Brannon Harris Way. The blocks were built in 1949 by the city to provide housing to low-income African-American veterans, and have had only minimal alteration since then. The district was listed on the National Register of Historic Places in 2022.

== Description and history ==
The Camden Street Development is located in Boston's Lower Roxbury area, on the northwest side of Shawmut Street between Camden Street and Brannon Harris Way. It consists of three buildings set on 1.27 acres (0.51 ha), oriented in a U shape around a large central open space. All three buildings have brick exteriors and flat roofs, and are three stories in height. Each consists of a large central block with smaller flanking wings that are set back slightly. The main building entrances are set at the corner junctions between the central blocks and wings. Each building houses 24 units, primarily with one bedroom each. Decorative elements of the exterior include burnt brick string courses.

The Camden Street area first developed as a residential area in the mid-19th century, providing middle and lower-income housing for workers in Roxbury's factories. In the late 19th-century it became more lower-class, with buildings converted into tenements. In 1939, the Boston Housing Authority (BHA) began urban redevelopment, razing slums in the area and completing the adjacent Lenox Street public housing project in 1940. In 1949 the BHA planned the Camden Street units as housing exclusively for lower-income African-American veterans and their families. The complex was designed by John Gray, a local architect who also designed some of the city's schools and other housing projects.

== See also ==
- National Register of Historic Places listings in southern Boston, Massachusetts
