= Nazing Court Apartments =

- U.S. National Register of Historic Places
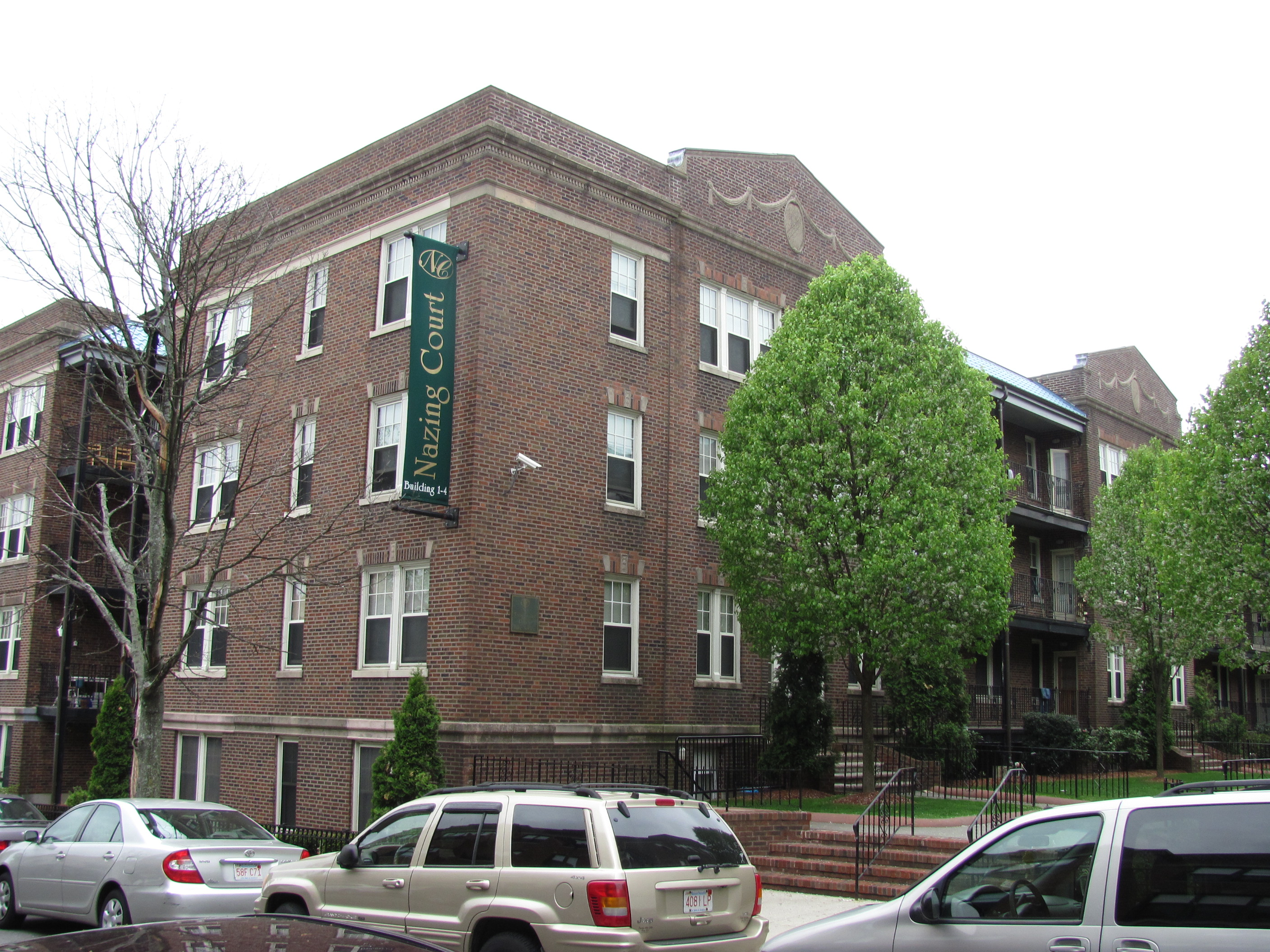
- Nazing Court Apartments

- Location within Massachusetts Location within the United States
- Location: Boston, Massachusetts
- Coordinates: 42°18′13″N 71°5′36″W
- Area: 2 acres (0.81 ha)
- Built: 1929
- Architect: Schein and Levine
- Architectural style: Classical Revival
- NRHP reference No.: 04000426
- Added to NRHP: May 12, 2004

The Nazing Court Apartments are a historic site at 224-236 Seaver Street and 1-8 Nazing Court in the Roxbury neighborhood of Boston, Massachusetts. It consists of two large Colonial Revival apartment blocks designed by Boston architect Sumner Schein and built in 1929. One houses 53 units, the other 98; they stand on a parcel overlooking Franklin Park. They were built to provide housing for Roxbury's burgeoning working-class Jewish community, and are a rare residential work of Schein, who did mostly commercial work.

The apartments were listed on the National Register of Historic Places in 2004.

== See also ==
- National Register of Historic Places listings in southern Boston, Massachusetts
