= Nathan Warnick Apartments =

Historic residential building in Boston, Massachusetts

- U.S. National Register of Historic Places
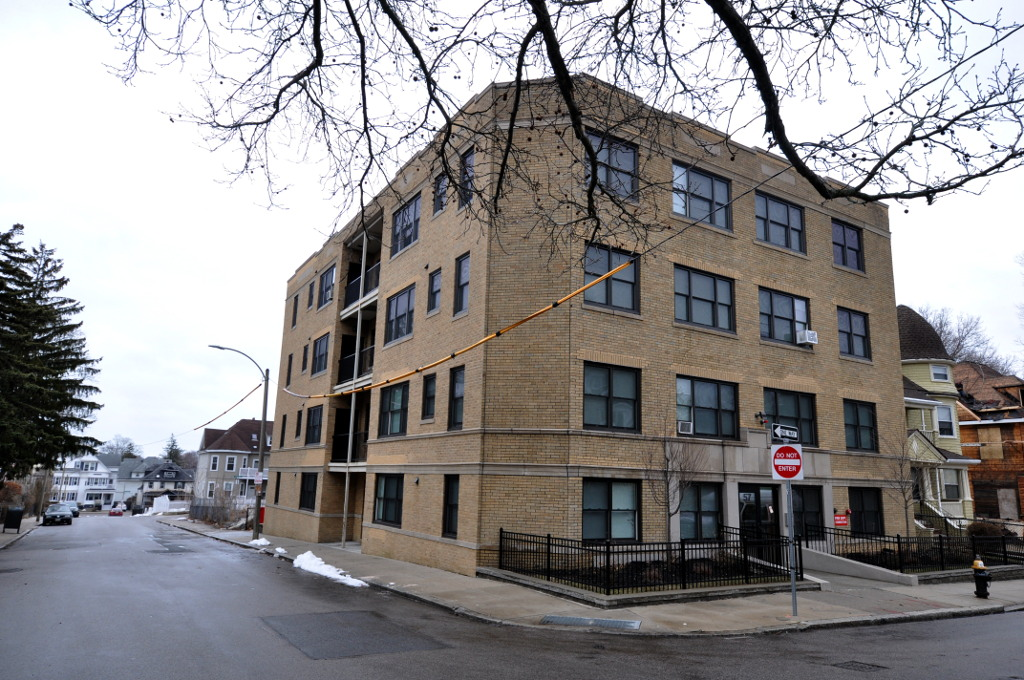

- Location within Massachusetts Location within the United States
- Location: 57 Bicknell Street, Boston, Massachusetts
- Coordinates: 42°17′55″N 71°4′59″W
- Area: less than one acre
- Built: c. 1929
- Architect: Bernard Levy
- Architectural style: Colonial Revival
- NRHP reference No.: 100003942
- Added to NRHP: December 23, 2019

The Nathan Warnick Apartments are a historic multifamily residential building at 57 Street in the Dorchester neighborhood of Boston, Massachusetts. It was built about 1929, during an influx of Jewish immigrants to the area, and is a good example of Colonial Revival architecture in brick and stone. The building was listed on the National Register of Historic Places in 2019.

== Description and history ==
The Nathan Warnick Apartments are in a mainly residential area of Dorchester, at the southeast corner of Bradshaw and Bicknell Streets in the Franklin Field North area. It is a single building, four stories in height, built out of buff brick with a stone foundation, cast stone trim, and a flat roof. The building is basically rectangular, with entrances near the centers of both street-facing facades, and an angled face at the street corner. The Bicknell Street facade is four bays wide, with upper-story bays occupied by bands of two or three sash windows. The main entrance is near the center of the facade, with similar bands of windows in the remaining ground-floor bays. The entrance is framed by a modestly styled cast stone surround, which joins a stone belt separating the first and second floors. The Bradshaw Street facade is longer, with a secondary entrance near its center, above which are paired recessed porches.

The apartment block was built in 1929 to a design by Bernard Levy, a locally prominent architect. The neighborhood had seen an influx of Irish immigration during the late 19th and early 20th century, which was taken over by Jewish migration, primarily by second-generation Jews who grew up in Boston's North and West Ends. Nathan Warnick, the builder, was a Jewish immigrant from Poland, and all of the building's early residents were Jews of Russian origin, either immigrants or first-generation descendants.

== See also ==
- National Register of Historic Places listings in southern Boston, Massachusetts
