= Greenwood Memorial United Methodist Church =

Historic church in Massachusetts, United States

- U.S. National Register of Historic Places
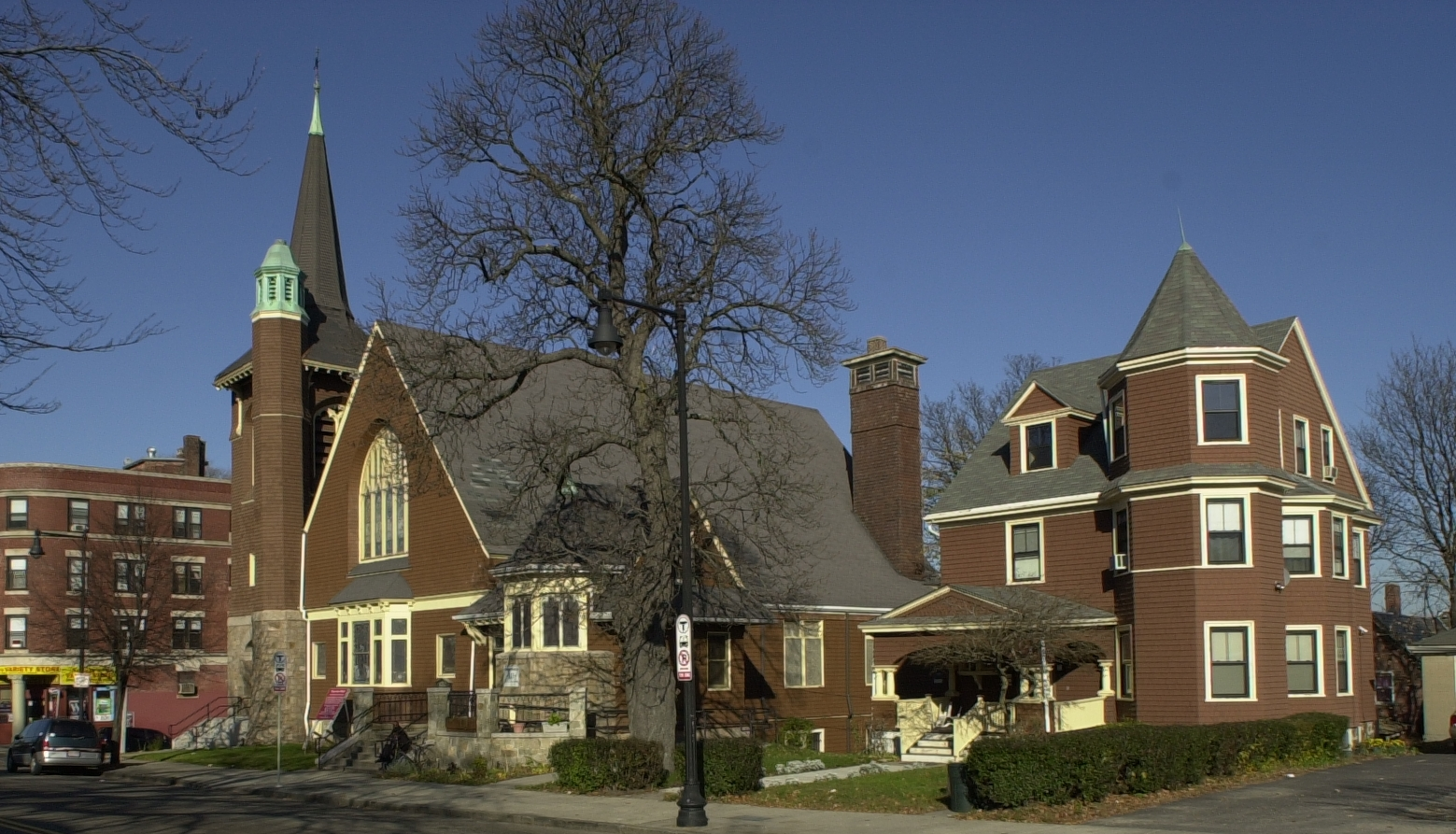

- Location within Massachusetts Location within the United States
- Location: 378A-380 Washington St., Boston, Massachusetts
- Coordinates: 42°17′54.1″N 71°4′21.9″W
- Area: less than one acre
- Built: 1900
- Architectural style: Shingle Style
- NRHP reference No.: 02000154
- Added to NRHP: March 08, 2002

Greenwood Memorial United Methodist Church (also known as "Highland Memorial Episcopal Church" or "Greenwood Memorial Church") is an historic church at 378A-380 Washington Street in the Dorchester neighborhood of Boston, Massachusetts.

The church building was designed by Walter J. Paine, and built in 1900–01 in the shingle style for a congregation established in 1838. The church was renamed in 1913 after a major bequest from parishioner Charles H. Greenwood in memory of his mother Sarah.

The church was listed on the National Register of Historic Places in 2002.

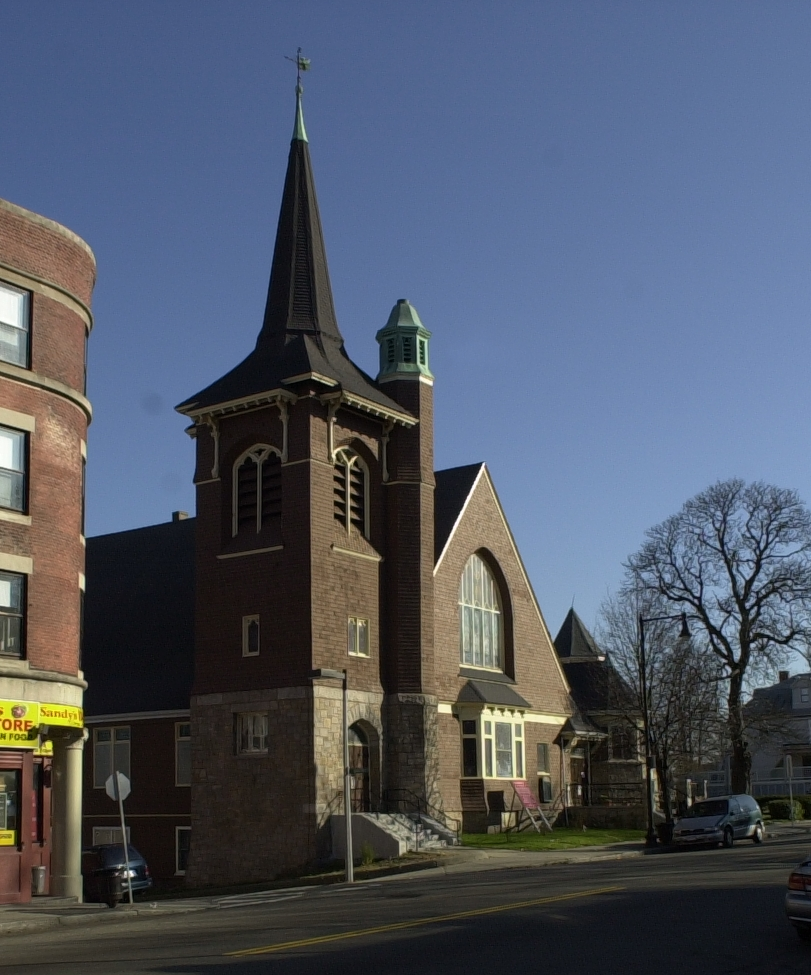

== See also ==
- National Register of Historic Places listings in southern Boston, Massachusetts
