= Dudley Terrace–Dudley Street Historic District =

Historic district in Massachusetts, United States

- U.S. National Register of Historic Places
- U.S. Historic district
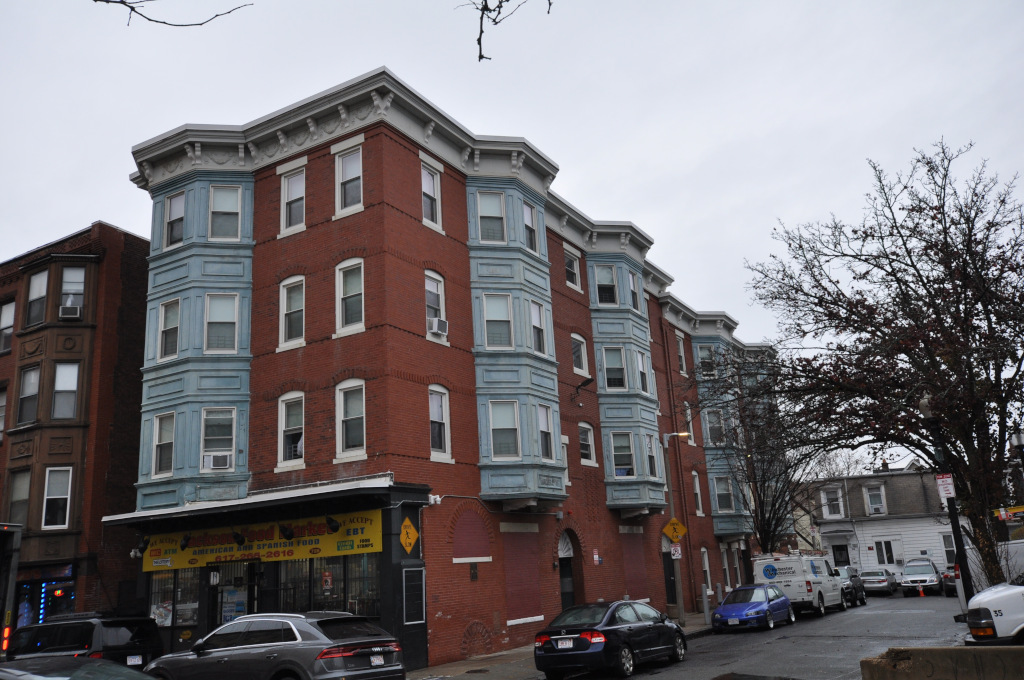
- Fosdick Block, Dudley Terrace

- Location within Massachusetts Location within the United States
- Location: 2-12 Dudley Terr., 713, 715-723, and 722-726 Dudley Street, Boston, Massachusetts
- Coordinates: 42°19′5″N 71°4′2″W
- Area: 1.12 acres (0.45 ha)
- Built: 1893
- Architect: Multiple
- Architectural style: Queen Anne; Renaissance Revival
- NRHP reference No.: 100008435
- Added to NRHP: December 1, 2022

The Dudley Terrace–Dudley Street Historic District is a historic district encompassing a cluster of four multifamily brick buildings in the Dorchester neighborhood of Boston, Massachusetts. Centered on the junction of Dudley Street and Virginia Avenue, the area was developed in the mid-1890s, and includes good examples of Queen Anne and Renaissance Revival architecture. The district was listed on the National Register of Historic Places in 2022.

== Description and history ==
Dudley Street runs northwest from Uphams Corner, a commercial district in northern Dorchester, into Roxbury. The historic district includes four buildings, two on either side of Dudley Street, at the junction with Monadnock Street. All four are multistory brick apartment houses, with three exhibiting Queen Anne styling and one in the Renaissance Revival style. Two of the buildings have commercial spaces on the ground floor. The Monadnock is the most distinctive, with a pale yellow brick facade punctuated by shallow projecting window bays.

The residential areas around Uphams Corner saw significant development in the late 19th century, when an electrified streetcar line was run down Columbia Avenue. These four buildings were built between c. 1893 and 1896, mainly for owners who lived nearby. The demographics of the early residents of the buildings were a mix of lower middle-class white Americans and mainly European and French Canadian immigrants. Architects involved in their construction include the noted Boston firm Dwight and Chandler, and local architect M. P. Morris.

== See also ==
- National Register of Historic Places listings in southern Boston, Massachusetts
