= Buildings at 825–829 Blue Hill Avenue =

- U.S. National Register of Historic Places
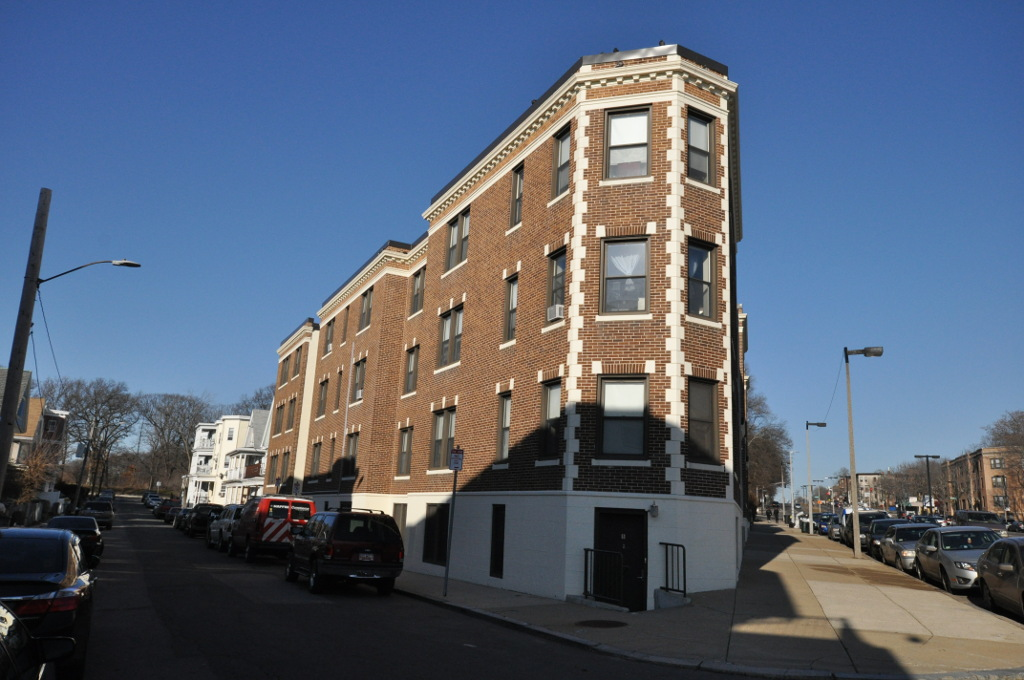

- Location within Massachusetts Location within the United States
- Location: 825–829 Blue Hill Avenue, Boston, Massachusetts
- Coordinates: 42°17′49″N 71°5′16″W
- Built: 1924
- Architect: Samuel Levy
- Architectural style: Colonial Revival
- NRHP reference No.: 14000561
- Added to NRHP: September 10, 2014

The buildings at 825–829 Blue Hill Avenue are historic apartment buildings in the Mattapan neighborhood of Boston, Massachusetts. The three-story Colonial Revival masonry structures were designed by Samuel Levy and built in 1924 for Herman Barron, during a period in which Boston's Jewish population migrated to the area in large numbers from downtown Boston. The buildings occupy a triangular lot at the corner of Blue Hill Avenue and Calder Street. Both street-facing facades feature alternating projecting and recessed bays, and are laid in seven-course Flemish bond brick. At the corner the building has two single-bay facades, one of which houses an entrance. These faces are ornamented with corner quoining in concrete. The main entrances of the buildings are on Blue Hill Avenue, sheltered by gabled porticos supported by Tuscan columns.

The buildings were listed on the National Register of Historic Places in 2014.

== See also ==
- National Register of Historic Places listings in southern Boston, Massachusetts
