= Cox Building (Boston) =

Historic building in Massachusetts, US

Coordinates: 42.3293°N 71.0898°W

The Cox Building is a historic building in Boston, Massachusetts, that stands at the intersection of Dudley and Bartlett Street in the neighborhood of Roxbury. It was constructed in 1870 to provide housing and commercial accommodation. The building is in two National Register districts, the Roxbury Highlands Historic District and the John Eliot Square District. In 1979, it was designated as a Boston Landmark by the Boston Landmarks Commission.

== Significance ==
The Cox Building typifies the post-Civil War transformation of Roxbury from mostly farmland to a fashionable suburb. Architecturally, the Cox building is significant in its U-shape and clever solution to terminating a triangular city block.
