= Adams-Nervine Asylum =

Historical hospital in Massachusetts

Geography
- Location: Jamaica Plain, Boston, Massachusetts, United States
- Coordinates: 42°18′13″N 71°7′31″W

History
- Constructed: 1875
- Opened: 1880
- Closed: 1976

Links
- Lists: Hospitals in Massachusetts
- Adams-Nervine Asylum
- U.S. National Register of Historic Places
- Boston Landmark
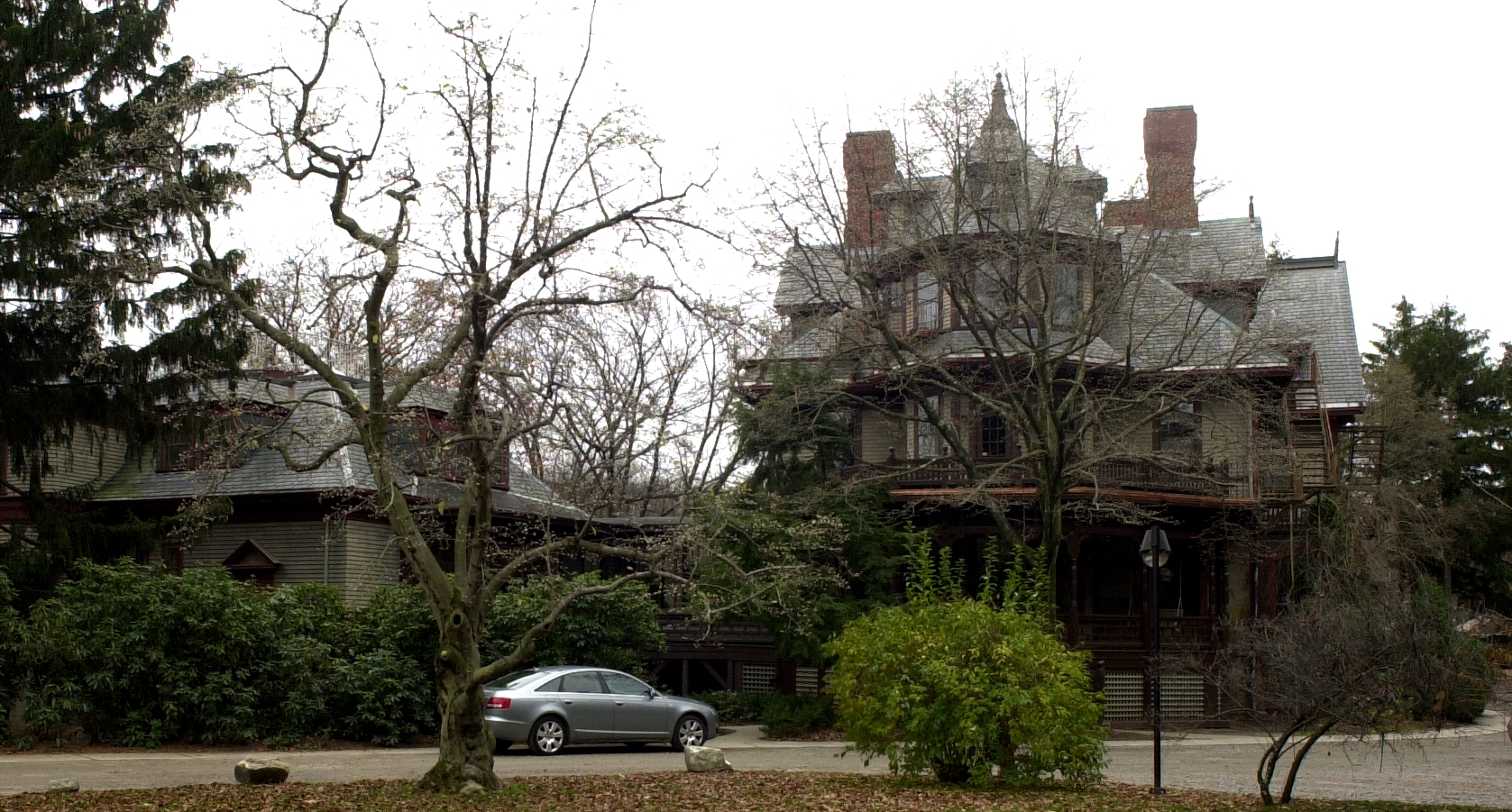

- Location within Massachusetts Location within the United States
- Location: 990–1020 Centre St., Boston, Massachusetts
- Area: 8.6 acres (3.5 ha)
- Built: 1875
- Architects: J. Pickering Putnam et al.
- Architectural style: Colonial Revival, Queen Anne, French Mansard
- NRHP reference No.: 82004456

Significant dates
- Closed: 1976
- Added to NRHP: June 1, 1982
- Designated BOSL: May 10, 1977

The Adams-Nervine Asylum was incorporated in 1877 and opened in 1880 in Jamaica Plain, Massachusetts. The estate provided an attractive, picturesque setting, as it was situated on Centre Street, in the neighborhood of Bussey Park and the Arnold Arboretum. Having previously been owned by J. Gardiner Weld, it was purchased by Seth Adams with his fortune acquired from his sugar refinery in South Boston. With his brother Isaac, Seth had formerly manufactured printing presses and machinery. On his death, his estate bequeathed $600,000 for the establishment of a curative institution for the benefit of indigent, debilitated and nervous people: inhabitants of the State who were not insane. The trustees purchased neighboring properties for the Asylum in 1879. The estate was vacated in 1976 and left to The Adams Trust.

== Theoretical practice ==
The institution was to incorporate the theories of Thomas Kirkbride. Kirkbride was a contemporary Philadelphian psychiatrist who developed the system of moral treatment for patients with nervous disorders. In his practice, he advocated a home-style atmosphere, non-isolation, and the dignity of the patients. The asylum was to stress the importance of patient individuality and freedom of movement.

== Patients ==
The first patient of the asylum was admitted on April 11, 1880. The statistics of the asylum show that of those admitted, unmarried women are in a great majority. According to the doctor, the nervousness in these women was directly related to them out working themselves and waiting upon others. Housework and teaching contributed to nearly 50 percent of the victims of nervous disorders. Nearly 20 percent of the patients came under the head of "housewives." Among housewives, overwork, care, anxiety, and sleeplessness, incident to domestic afflictions, were the assigned causes. The asylum's only patient who has since become well-known was Alice James. Sister to novelist Henry James and psychologist William James, Alice was treated at the Adams-Nervine during the summer of 1883.

The number of recoveries at the asylum was not large. One of the asylum's doctors, Dr. Webber, stated in an annual report, "Many patients have been ailing for years, or have inherited a weak, nervous organization, and those among such patients whose means have been limited have been obliged to uses their strength and energy in keeping the home circle unbroken. The strain of this upon a naturally weak, nervous system is severe, and in such cases, a partial recovery is the most that can be expected from a 'few months' stay at the asylum. The relief obtained is, however, of great benefit, enabling the patient to take up her burdens again with fresh courage and renewed strength. They do not realize the amount of strength they have gained until after returning to their accustomed labors, and many continue to improve, and subsequently regain full health."

The average stay of patients at the Asylum was a little over four months, and few stayed longer than six. Occasionally a patient remained for a year, but this was not considered desirable.

== Architectural history ==
The complex is made up of three large buildings and four smaller ones. The oldest structure, the J. Gardiner Weld House, was built c. 1875, in the French Mansard style. The unknown architect delivered a facile version of the French Mansard style villa and the interior ornament was also elaborate, academic, and architectonically placed to articulate openings, corners, and other shifts of plane. Interior revisions were made in 1879 when the house became the administrative offices.

The Adams House, built in 1880, served the female patients; it was not until 1895 that a House for Men was completed. Men never numbered more than 25% of the total patient population of about forty.

The Director's House displayed the neo-classical symmetry and proportions of the Colonial Revival style and contrasts with the picturesque forms of the Weld Mansion and Adams House.

The asylum designated as a Boston Landmark by the Boston Landmarks Commission in 1977 and added to the National Register of Historic Places in 1982. The buildings in the complex have become condominiums and apartments.

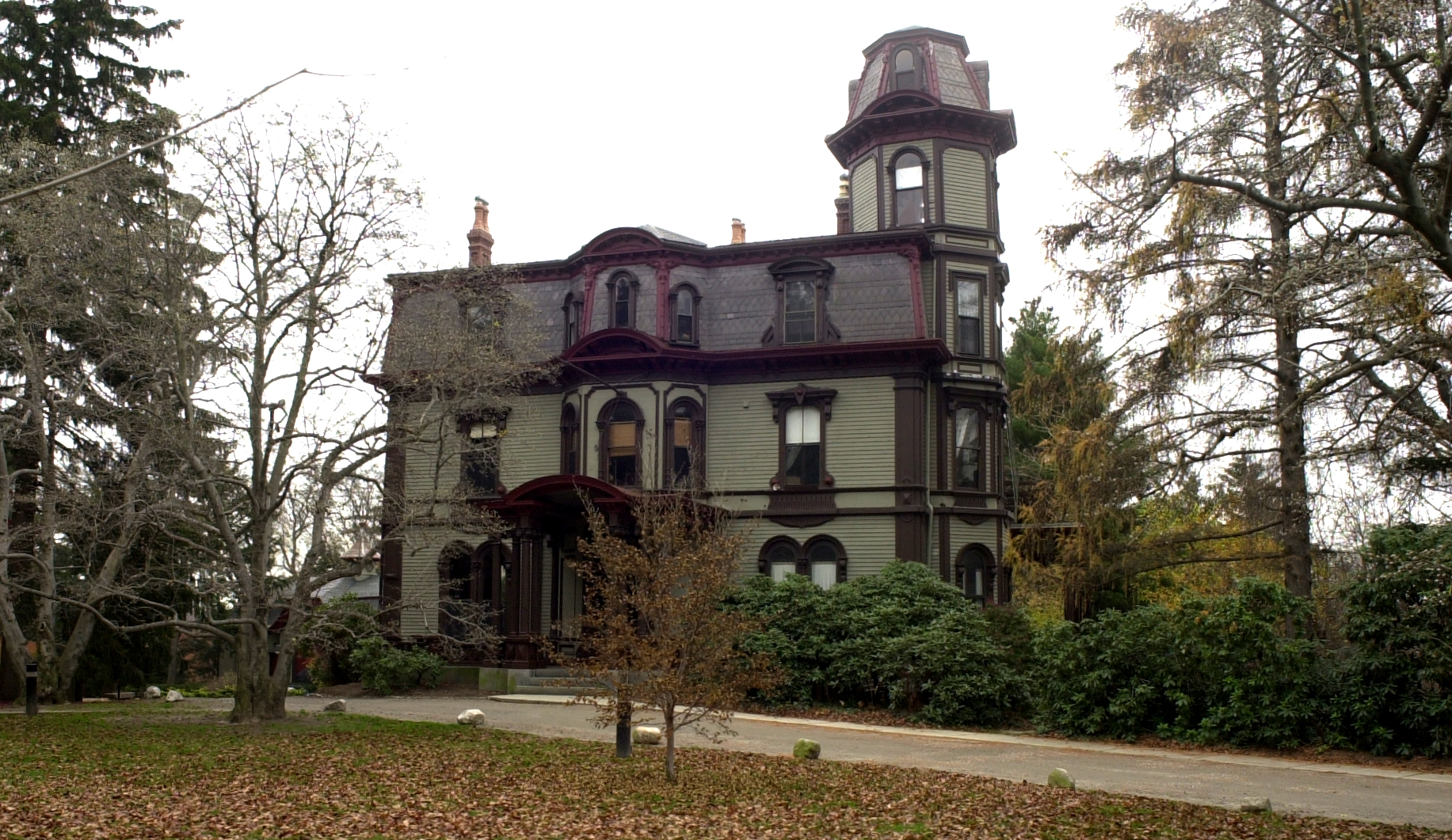

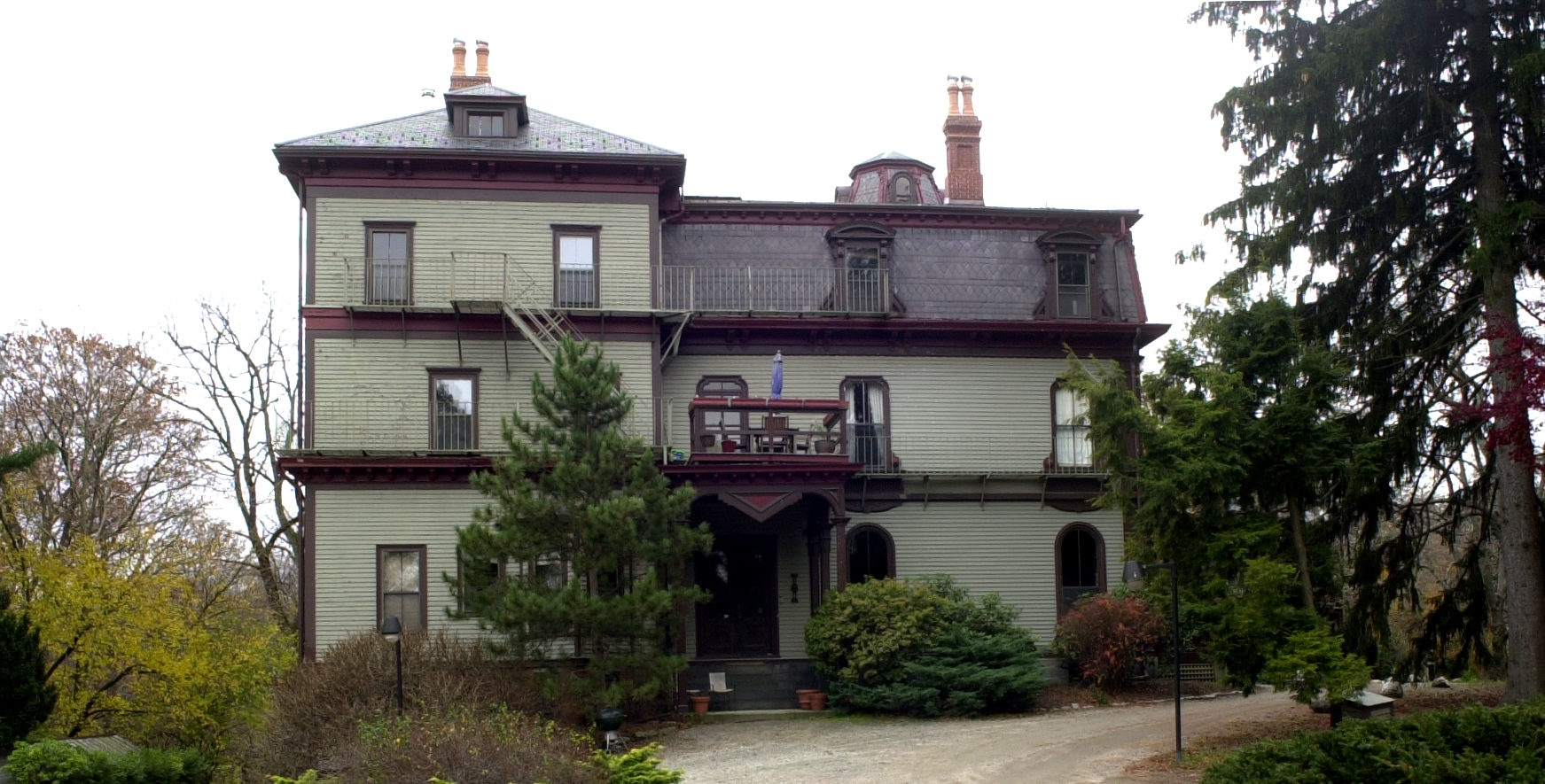

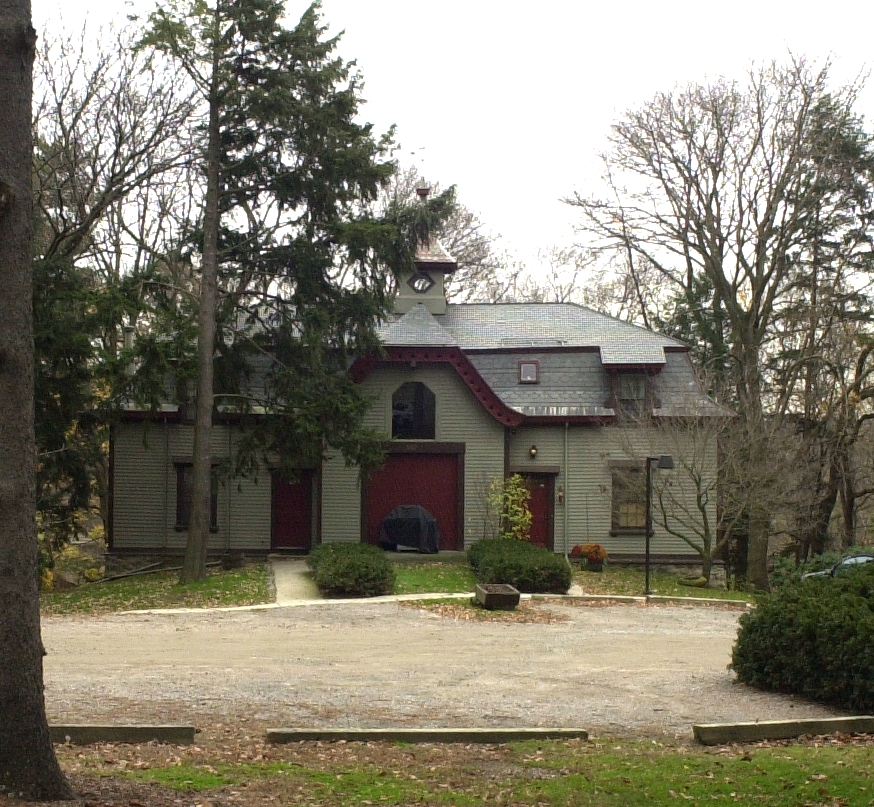

== See also ==
- National Register of Historic Places listings in southern Boston, Massachusetts
