= Boston Landmark =

Designation for historic sites in Boston, Massachusetts

A Boston Landmark is a designation by the Boston Landmarks Commission for historic buildings and sites throughout the city of Boston based on the grounds that it has historical, social, cultural, architectural or aesthetic significance to the city, Massachusetts, New England, or the United States. While National Landmark or National Register status can provide tax incentives for the owner of an income-producing property, local landmark status provides more control over modifications to a designated historic structure or place.

== Criteria ==
For a group to start a designation procedure, they first meet with Boston Landmarks Commission staff to discuss the petition process. Once a complete petition is submitted, a preliminary hearing is scheduled to determine if the Commission will accept the petition for further study. If the Commission accepts the petition, the building or site is added to the pending Landmarks list. Preparation of a study report on the proposed Landmark is the next step. A public hearing process follows to present the draft study report. A 2/3 majority vote of the Commission is necessary for a property to be designated as a Boston Landmark. The decision must then be confirmed by the Mayor of Boston and by the Boston City Council. The Boston Landmarks Commission determines if a property is eligible for landmark status based on whether it

1. Is a site that represents some important aspect of cultural, political, economic, military, or social history
2. Is a site that has a significant association with an outstanding historic person
3. Is a notable work of an influential architect, landscape architect, designer, or builder
4. Represents elements of design with distinctive characteristics of a period, style or method of construction or development.

Once designated, any proposed alterations must be reviewed and approved by the Boston Landmarks Commission.

== Recent designations ==
In 2016, a commissioner submitted a petition to the Boston Landmarks Commission to designate the Citgo sign above Kenmore Square, when its support building at 660 Beacon Street was in the process of being sold by Boston University. The petition was accepted and the sign is a pending Landmark, with research for the study report underway. Twelve landmarks were added in 2024.

A number of sites have remained pending since the 1980s.

== Demolished Boston Landmarks ==
The 1840 Roswell Gleason house in Dorchester was granted landmark status in 1977. It was destroyed by fire in 1982.

== List of designated Boston Landmarks ==
Boston Landmarks	Location	Date Designated	Image	References
20–30 Bromfield Street	20–30 Bromfield Street	1983		
39 & 41 Princeton Street (Stephen Huse Whidden House & Joseph Henry Stephenson House) Architectural Conservation District	East Boston	1991		
5–7 Broad Street	5–7 Broad Street	1983		
Aberdeen Architectural Conservation District	Brighton	2001		
Adams-Nervine Asylum	990–1020 Centre Street, Jamaica Plain	1977		
Alvah Kittredge House	10 Linwood Street, Roxbury	2016		
Arlington Street Church	355 Boylston Street, Back Bay	1978		
Armory of the First Corps of Cadets	97–105 Arlington Street	1977		
Austin Block	90–92 Main Street, Charlestown	1981		
Back Bay Fens	The Fenway	1983		
Batterymarch Building	54 Battermarch Street, Jamaica Plain	1995		
Bay State Road / Back Bay West Architectural Conservation District	Bay State Road	1979		
Bay Village Architectural Conservation District	Bay Village	1983		
Blackstone Block Street Network	Blackstone Block	1983		
Boston City Hall	1 City Hall Square	2025		
Boston Common	Beacon Street	1977		
Boston Young Men's Christian Union Building	48 Boylston Street, Theater District	1977		
Boylston Building	2 Boylston Street, Theater District	1977		
Brook Farm	670 Baker Street, West Roxbury	1977		
Burrage House	137 Beacon Street, Back Bay	1992		
Charles River Esplanade	Beacon Hill / Back Bay	2009		
Charles River Speedway Administration Building	1420–1440 Soldiers Field Road, Brighton	2013		
Charlestown Savings Bank Building	1–4 Thompson Square, Charlestown	1981		
Christian Science Center Complex	Fenway	2011		
Church Green Buildings	101–103,105–113 Summer Street	1979		
Commonwealth Avenue Mall	Back Bay	1977		
Cox Building	1–7 Dudley Street, Roxbury	1980		
Donald McKay House	80 White Street, East Boston	1977		
Dorchester North Burying Ground	Columbia Road, Dorchester	1981		
Dorchester Pottery Works	101–105 Victory Road, Dorchester	1980		
Ebenezer Hancock House	Marshall Street	1978		
Edward Everett House	16 Harvard Street, Charlestown	1996		
Elizabeth Peabody Bookstore and Circulating Library	13–15 West Street	2011		
Eustis Street Architectural Conservation District	Roxbury	1981		
Exchange Building	53 State Street	1980		
Faneuil Hall	1–10 Faneuil Hall Square	1994		
Federal Reserve Bank	30 Pearl Street	1978		
Fort Point Channel Landmark District	South Boston	2008		
Fowler-Clark Farm	487 Norfolk Street, Mattapan	2006		
Franklin Park	Roxbury	1980		
George Milliken House	44 Virginia Street, Dorchester	2007		
Gibson House (Interior)	187 Beacon Street, Back Bay	1992		
Harrison Loring House	789 East Broadway, South Boston	1984		
Hayden Building	681 Washington Street, Theater District	1977		
International Trust Company Building	45 Milk Street	1978		
Isabella Stewart Gardner Museum	280 The Fenway	2013		
Jacob Wirth Buildings	31–39 Stuart Street, Theater District	1977		
James Blake House	210 East Cottage Street, Dorchester	1978		
James Michael Curley House	350 Jamaicaway, Jamaica Plain	1989		
Lewis–Dawson Farmhouse at the Arnold Arboretum	1090 Centre Street, Jamaica Plain	2007		
Liberty Tree Building	628–636 Washington Street, Theater District	1985		
Loring–Greenough House	12 South Street, Jamaica Plain	1999		
Malcolm X—Ella Little-Collins House	72 Dale Street, Roxbury	1998		
McCormack Post Office and Courthouse	5 Post Office Square	1998		
Mission Church Complex	Mission Hill	2004		
Modern Theatre	523–525 Washington Street	2002		
North Market (Quincy Market)	Faneuil Hall Market Place	2024		
Oak Square School	35 Nonantum Street, Brighton	1979		
Old State House	208 Washington Street	1994		
Paramount Theater	549–563 Washington Street, Theater District	1984		
Proctor Building	100–106 Bedford Street	1983		
Public Garden	Beacon Street	1977		
Quincy Market	Faneuil Hall Market Place	1996		
South End Landmark District	South End	1983		
South Market (Quincy Market)	Faneuil Hall Market Place	2024		
St. Botolph Street Architectural Conservation District	St. Botolph Street	1981		
St. Gabriel's Monastery Building	159 Washington Street, Brighton	1989		
Theodore Parker Unitarian Church	1851 Centre Street, West Roxbury	1985		
Trinity Neighborhood House	406 Meridian Street, East Boston	1981		
Tugboat Luna	Charles River	1985		
United Shoe Machinery Corporation Building	140 Federal Street	1983		
Vienna Brewery Complex	133 Halleck & 37 Station, Roxbury	1999		
Wilbur Theatre	250 Tremont Street, Theater District	1987		
William Monroe Trotter House	97 Sawyer Avenue, Dorchester	1977		

== Historic districts ==
As of 2025, there were seven historic designated districts and three architectural districts. Each district has its own commission staffed by a preservation planner within the Boston Landmarks Commission. The commissioners assure that the architectural and historical integrity of the district is not compromised. The districts include:

- Aberdeen Architectural Conservation District
- Back Bay Architectural District
- Bay State Road/Back Bay West Architectural Conservation District
- Bay Village Historic District
- Fort Point Channel Landmark District
- Highland Park Architectural Conservation District
- Historic Beacon Hill District
- Mission Hill Triangle Architectural Conservation District
- South End Landmark District
- St. Botolph Architectural Conservation District

Highland Park in Roxbury was most recently designated in 2022.

Since 2022, the Monument Square Landmark District in Charlestown has been under study as a potential designated district following the submission of a petition by voters.
