= 5–7 Broad Street (Boston) =

Building in Massachusetts, United States

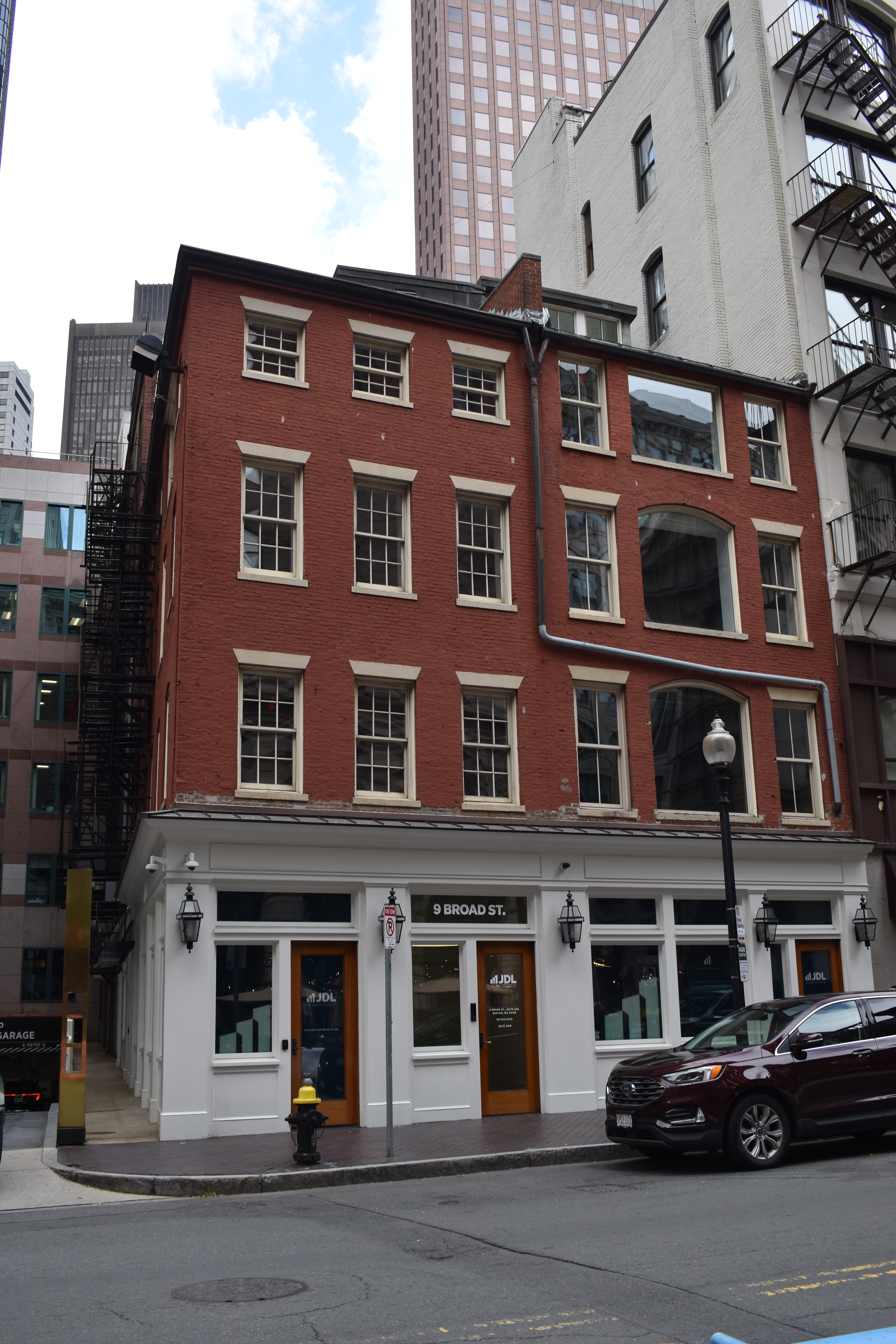

5–7 Broad Street is a historical building in Boston, Massachusetts. Designed by Boston architect Charles Bulfinch in 1805, it is one of the few remaining commercial Federal period structures within the Central Business District of Boston. It was designated a Boston Landmark in 1983 by the Boston Landmarks Commission and is in the National Register Custom House District.

== History ==
Prominent Boston entrepreneurs incorporated the Broad Street Association in 1805. The Association worked to upgrade the development scheme for the waterfront south of Long Wharf. The improvements instigated by the Broad Street Association contributed to the transformation of Boston into one of the leading centers of trade and commerce in the United States.

== Current ==
Today, the building houses a restaurant and bar on the first floor and offices on the upper floors.
