= Alvah Kittredge House =

Historic house in Massachusetts, United States

- U.S. National Register of Historic Places
- U.S. Historic district – Contributing property
- Boston Landmark
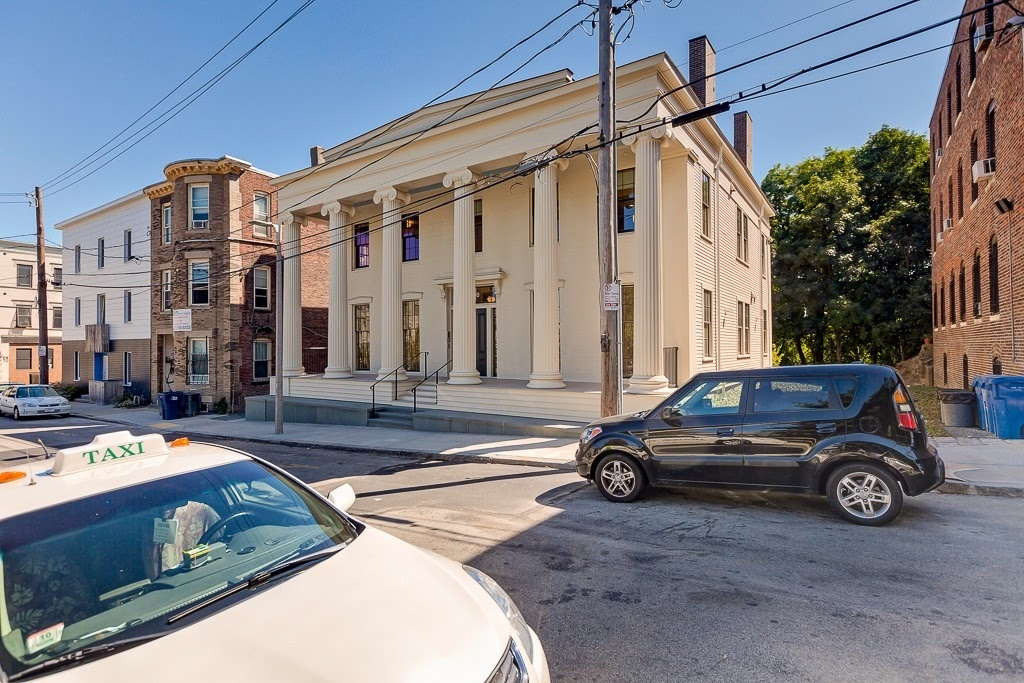

- Location within Massachusetts Location within the United States
- Location: 12 Linwood Street, Boston, Massachusetts
- Coordinates: 42°19′47″N 71°5′38″W
- Built: 1836
- Architectural style: Greek Revival
- Part of: Roxbury Highlands Historic District (ID89000147)
- NRHP reference No.: 73000855

Significant dates
- Added to NRHP: May 8, 1973
- Designated CP: February 22, 1989
- Designated BOSL: January 12, 2016

The Alvah Kittredge House is an historic house in the highlands of the Roxbury neighborhood of Boston, Massachusetts. The 2 1/2-story Greek Revival mansion was built in 1836 for Alvah Kittredge, a leading real estate developer of the time. It was originally located at the site of the Roxbury Low Fort, a defensive earthworks of the American Revolutionary War, and was moved to its present site after 1896. It was the home of noted Boston architect Nathaniel J. Bradlee for 30 years.

The house was listed on the National Register of Historic Places in 1973 and designated a Boston Landmark by the Boston Landmarks Commission in 2016.

== See also ==
- National Register of Historic Places listings in southern Boston, Massachusetts
