= Loring–Greenough House =

Historic house in Massachusetts, United States

- U.S. National Register of Historic Places
- Boston Landmark
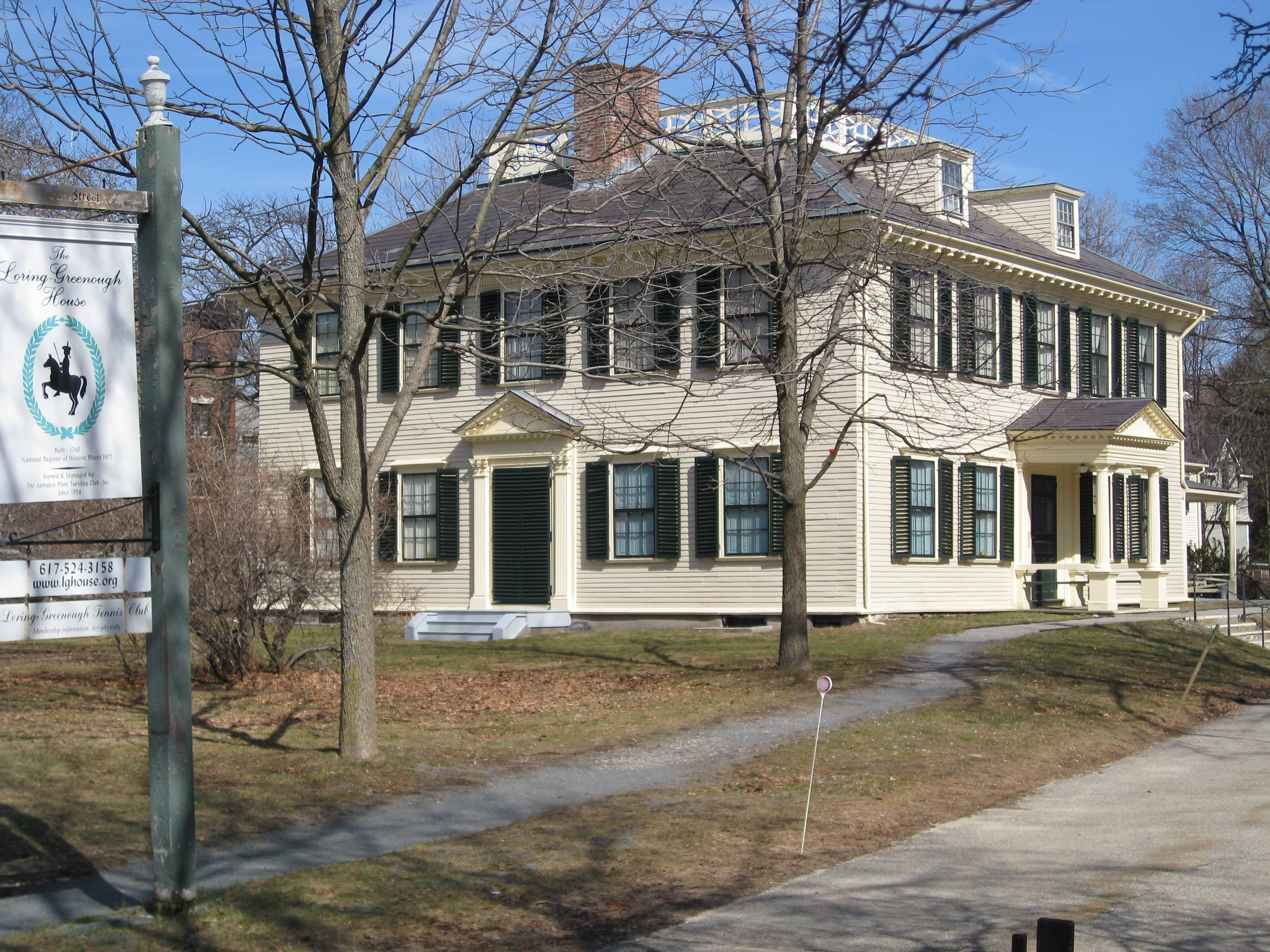
- South and west facades

- Location within Massachusetts
- Location: 12 South St., Boston, Massachusetts
- Coordinates: 42°18′34.4″N 71°6′54″W
- Area: 1.8 acres (0.73 ha)
- Built: 1760
- Architectural style: Colonial
- NRHP reference No.: 72000544

Significant dates
- Added to NRHP: April 26, 1972
- Designated BOSL: April 27, 1999

The Loring–Greenough House is the last surviving 18th century residence in Sumner Hill, a historic section of Jamaica Plain, Massachusetts, a neighborhood of Boston. It is located at 12 South Street on Monument Square at the edge of Sumner Hill. It is situated on the border of two National Historic Districts (Sumner Hill and Monument Square).

This mid-Georgian mansion was built as a country residence and farmstead in 1760 for wealthy British naval officer Commodore Joshua Loring on the original site of John Polley's estate established in the 1650s. Originally, the Loring–Greenough house was situated on an 80-acre (320,000 m^{2}) estate. Loring, a Loyalist prior to the American Revolution, abandoned the house in 1774, just prior to the conflict, and he fled from Boston in 1776. The house was confiscated by colonial forces and in 1776 served as a headquarters for General Nathanael Greene and, soon after, a hospital for Continental Army soldiers following the Battle of Bunker Hill.

In 1780, the house was sold to Isaac Sears, the rebel leader from New York, and was then purchased in 1784 by Ann Doane, a rich widow, who soon after married David Stoddard Greenough. (Note: David Greenough was president of the Dedham Manufacturing Company.) General William Hyslop Sumner married the widow of David Stoddard Greenough II (Maria Doane Greenough) in 1836 and by the late 1850s the process to subdivide the estate and farmland had begun. The Greenough descendants lived here for five generations until 1924. At that time the Jamaica Plain Tuesday Club (until 1993 a ladies'-only club and today a community group) purchased the house, along with almost two acres of landscaped grounds, to preserve it and save it from development.

The Loring–Greenough House is a very well preserved structure of almost 4,500 square feet (420 m^{2}), on property that includes sweeping lawns, historic flower beds, handsome trees, and the two-and-one-half-story house itself. The property is fenced and gated; the public is invited to enjoy the grounds during daylight hours, and to attend events inside and outside the House throughout the year. The Tuesday Club has been careful to preserve the house and grounds over many decades. The most recent restoration occurred with a $350,000 grant and included painting and other repairs.

The Loring–Greenough property is still owned and operated by the Tuesday Club, which offers tours on Sundays and other programming and events throughout the year. It is listed on the National Register of Historic Places and was designated both a Massachusetts Landmark and a Boston Landmark by the Boston Landmarks Commission in 1999.

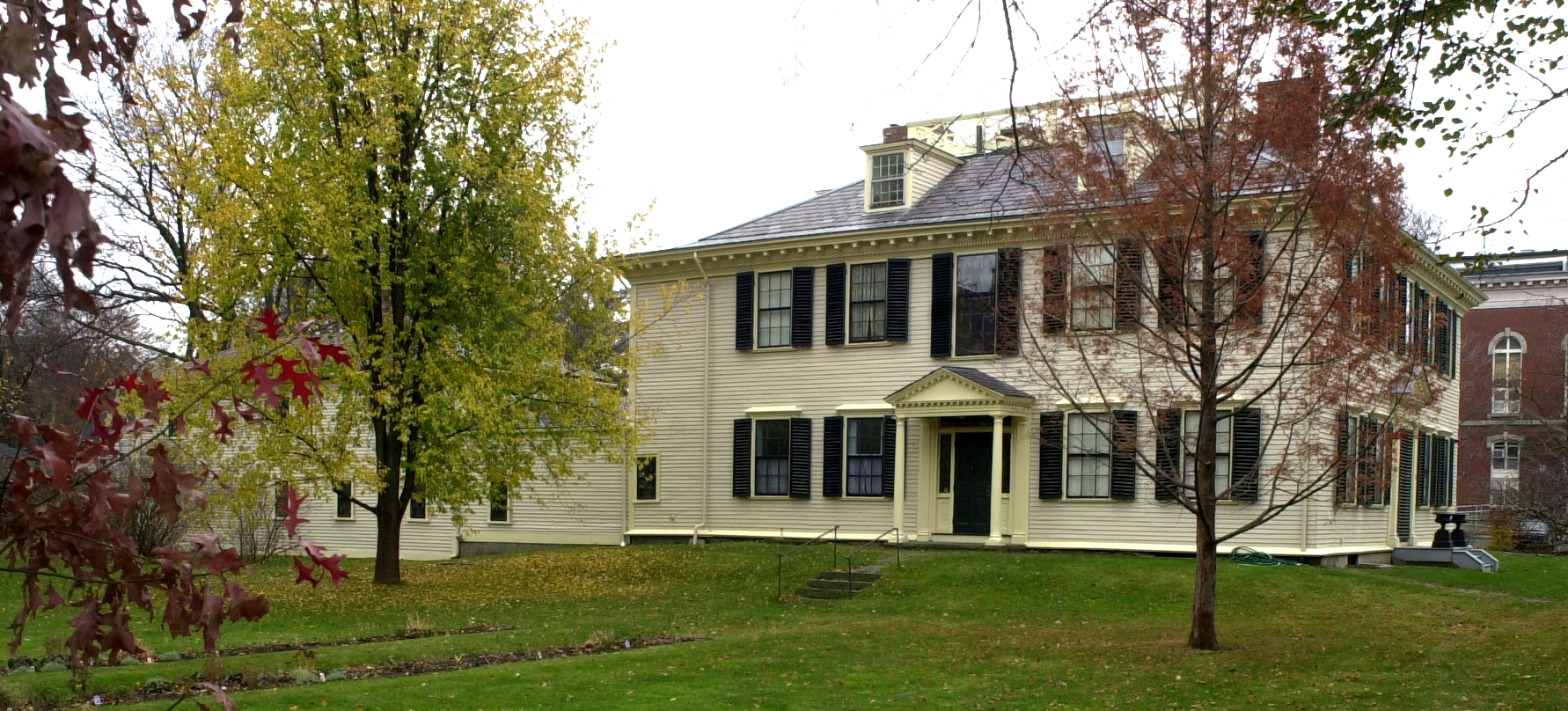
East facade

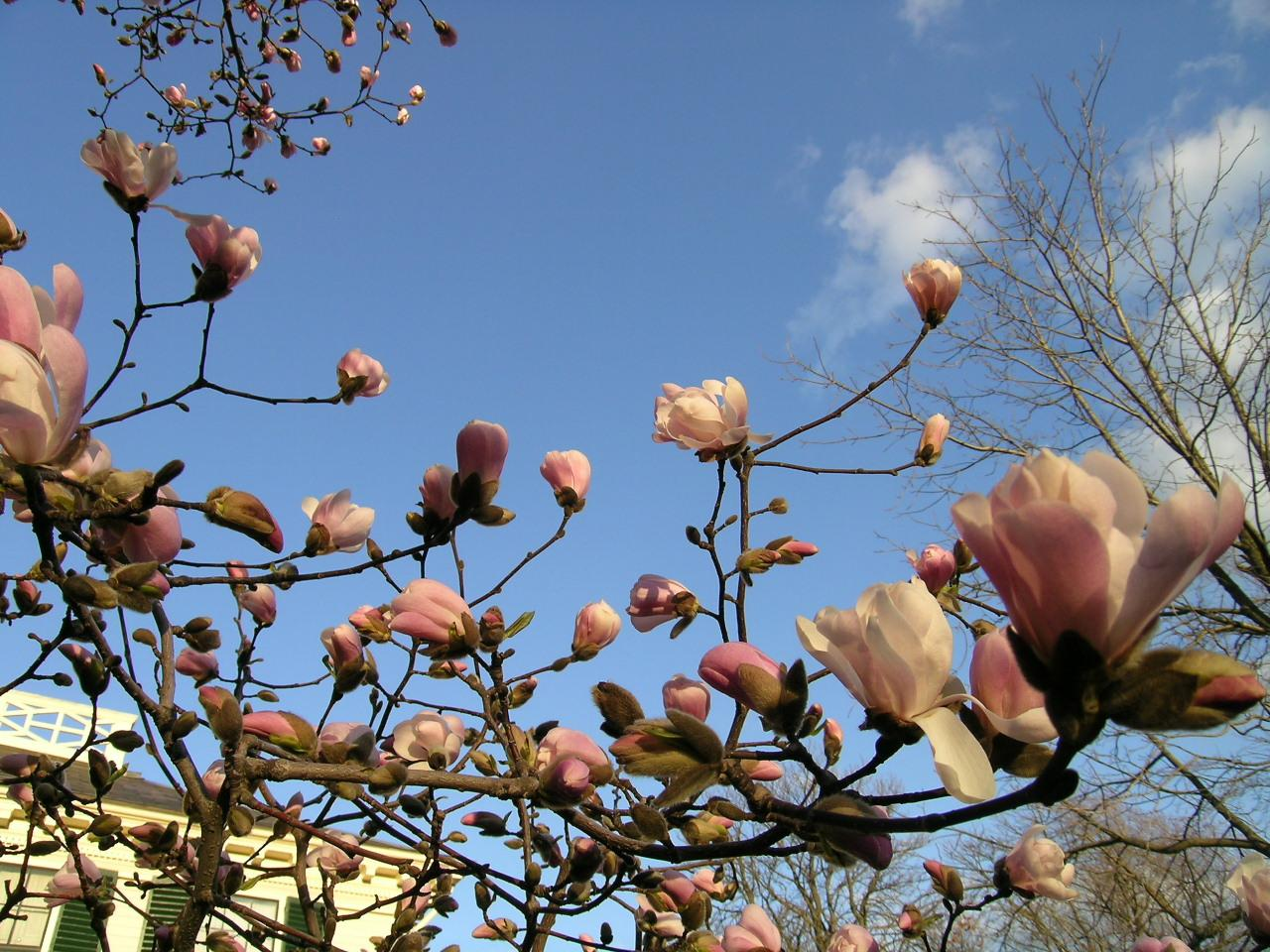
Magnolias bloom in early April on the grounds of the Loring–Greenough House

== See also ==
- National Register of Historic Places listings in southern Boston, Massachusetts
