= Liberty Tree District =

- U.S. National Register of Historic Places
- U.S. Historic district
- Boston Landmark
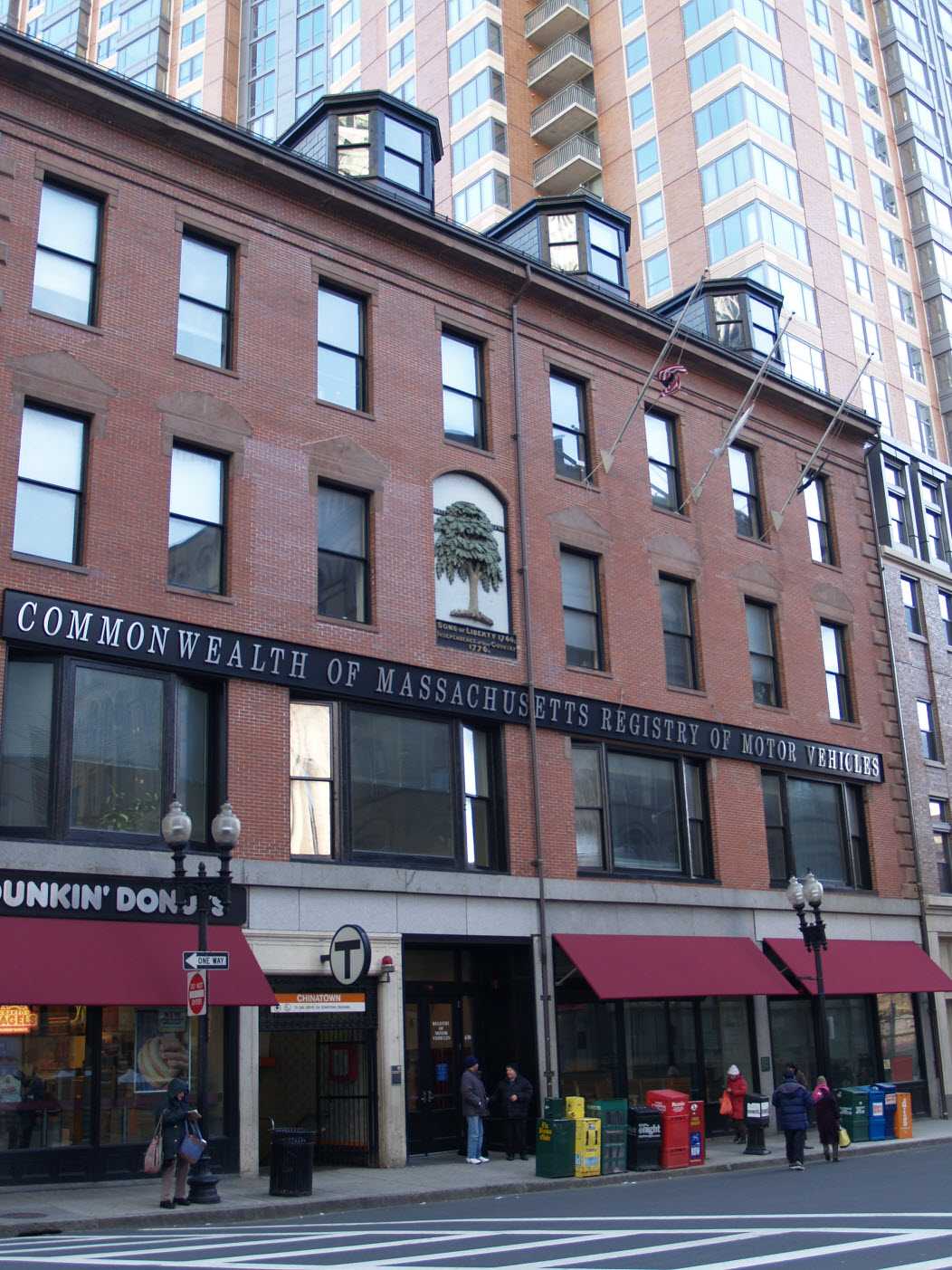
- Liberty Tree Building

- Location within Boston Location within Massachusetts Location within the United States
- Location: Washington and Essex Streets, downtown Boston, Massachusetts
- Coordinates: 42°21′7″N 71°3′47″W
- Area: 0.6 acres (0.24 ha)
- Architectural style: Greek Revival, Late Victorian, Italianate
- MPS: Boston Theatre MRA
- NRHP reference No.: 80000460

Significant dates
- Added to NRHP: December 9, 1980
- Designated BOSL: April 9, 1985

The Liberty Tree District is a historic district encompassing a collection of six mid-scale commercial buildings between the Downtown Crossing area and the Theater District of Boston, Massachusetts. Located at and near the junction of Washington and Essex Streets, it is a well-preserved collection of mid-19th century commercial architecture, with a history as an important commercial part of Boston dating to the 18th century. The district was added to the National Register of Historic Places in 1980.

== Description and history ==
The Liberty Tree District is a roughly L-shaped district, centered on the southeast corner of Washington and Essex Streets in downtown Boston. This corner was at the edge of the area known in the 20th century as Boston's Combat Zone, or adult entertainment district. In Boston's early colonial period, Washington Street was the only road off the Shawmut Peninsula, and this area was one that catered to travelers. In the 1760s it was the site of the Liberty Tree and the Liberty Tree Tavern, a focal point of colonial discontent against British rule. This significance is reflected in a carved relief on the Liberty Tree Block, the brick commercial block built in 1850 at the corner of Washington and Essex. The building was designated as a Boston Landmark by the Boston Landmarks Commission in 1985.

The oldest building in the district is the 1824 Lafayette Hotel, located next to the Liberty Tree Block on Washington Street. Its modest Federal-style facade is actually an early 20th-century alteration. Lining Essex Street east of the Liberty Tree Block are a collection of smaller late 19th-century commercial blocks, three of which have Gothic exteriors, and one has a rare surviving wooden facade from the 1870s.

== See also ==
- National Register of Historic Places listings in northern Boston, Massachusetts
