= Harrison Loring House =

Historic house in Massachusetts, United States

- U.S. National Register of Historic Places
- Boston Landmark
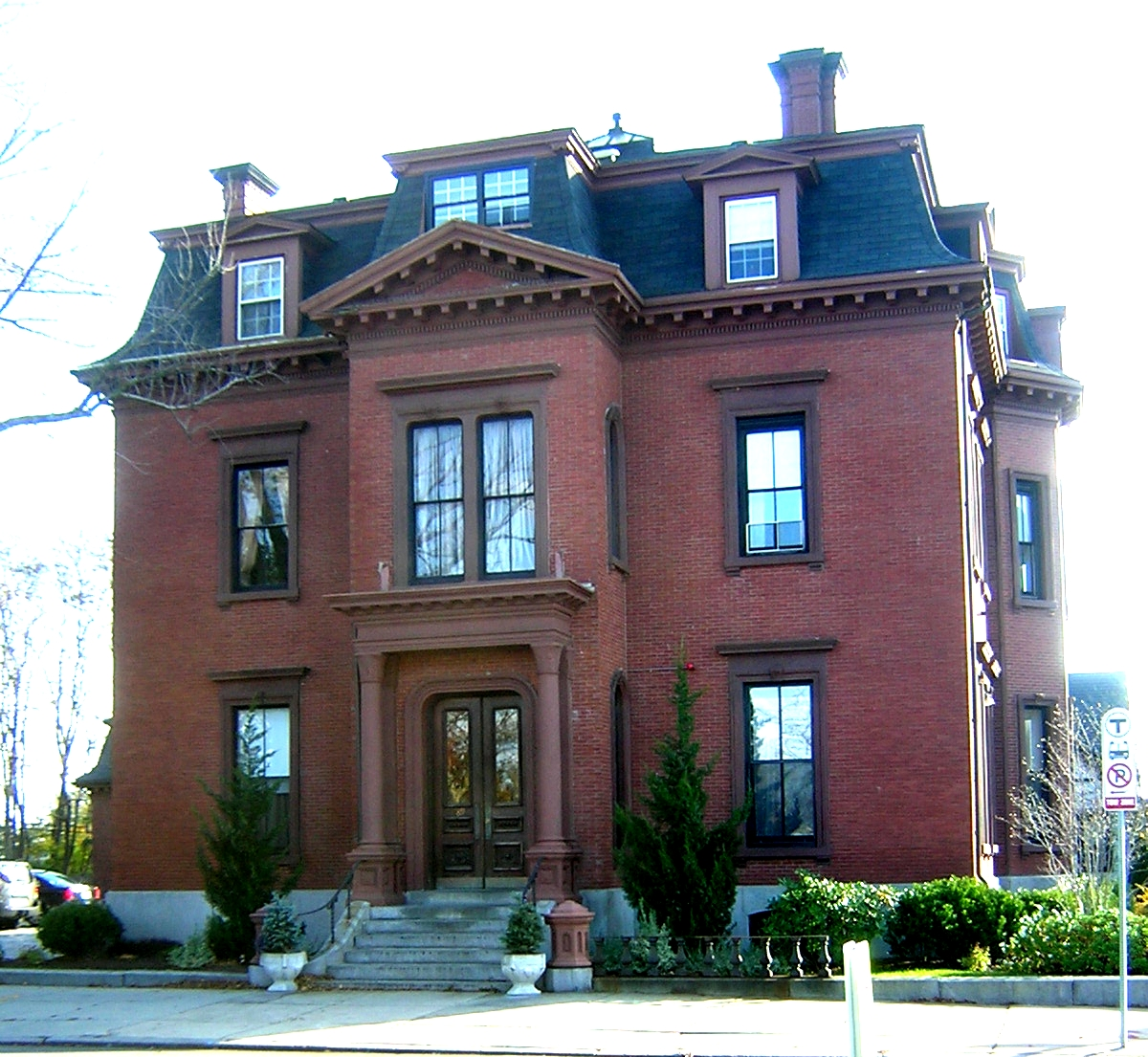

- Location within Massachusetts Location within the United States
- Location: 789 E. Broadway, Boston, Massachusetts
- Coordinates: 42°20′7.5″N 71°1′59″W
- Area: 0.3 acres (0.12 ha)
- Built: 1865
- Architectural style: Second Empire
- NRHP reference No.: 83000604

Significant dates
- Added to NRHP: September 01, 1983
- Designated BOSL: June 23, 1984

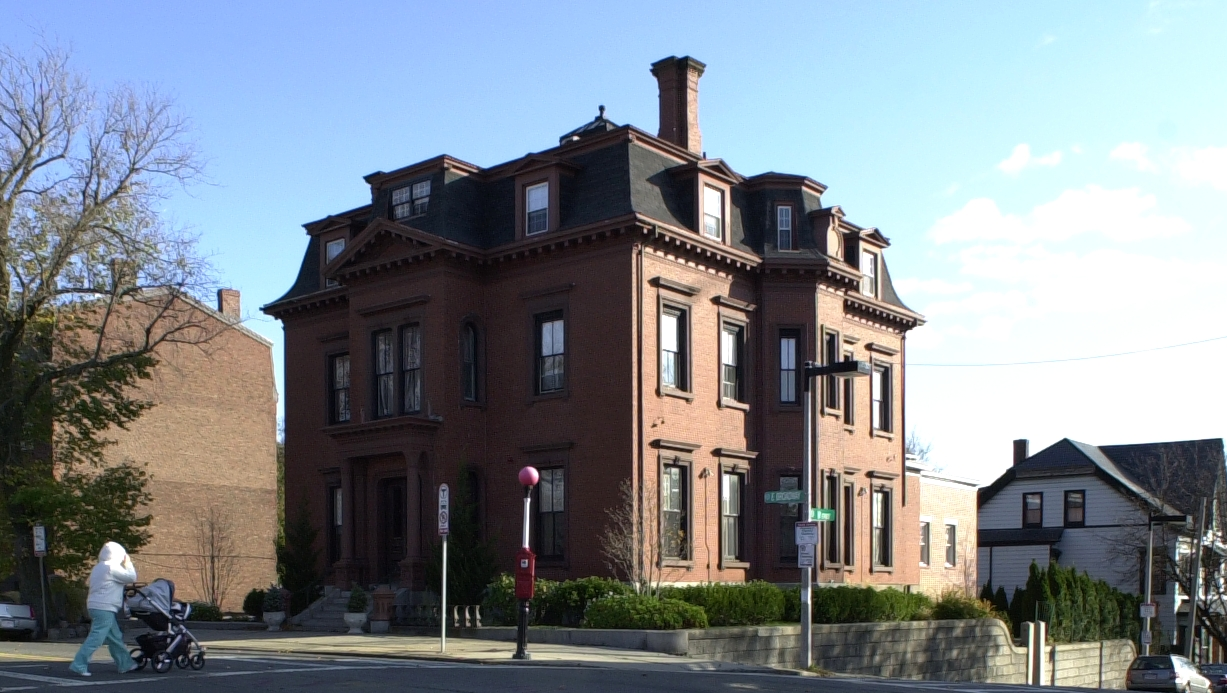

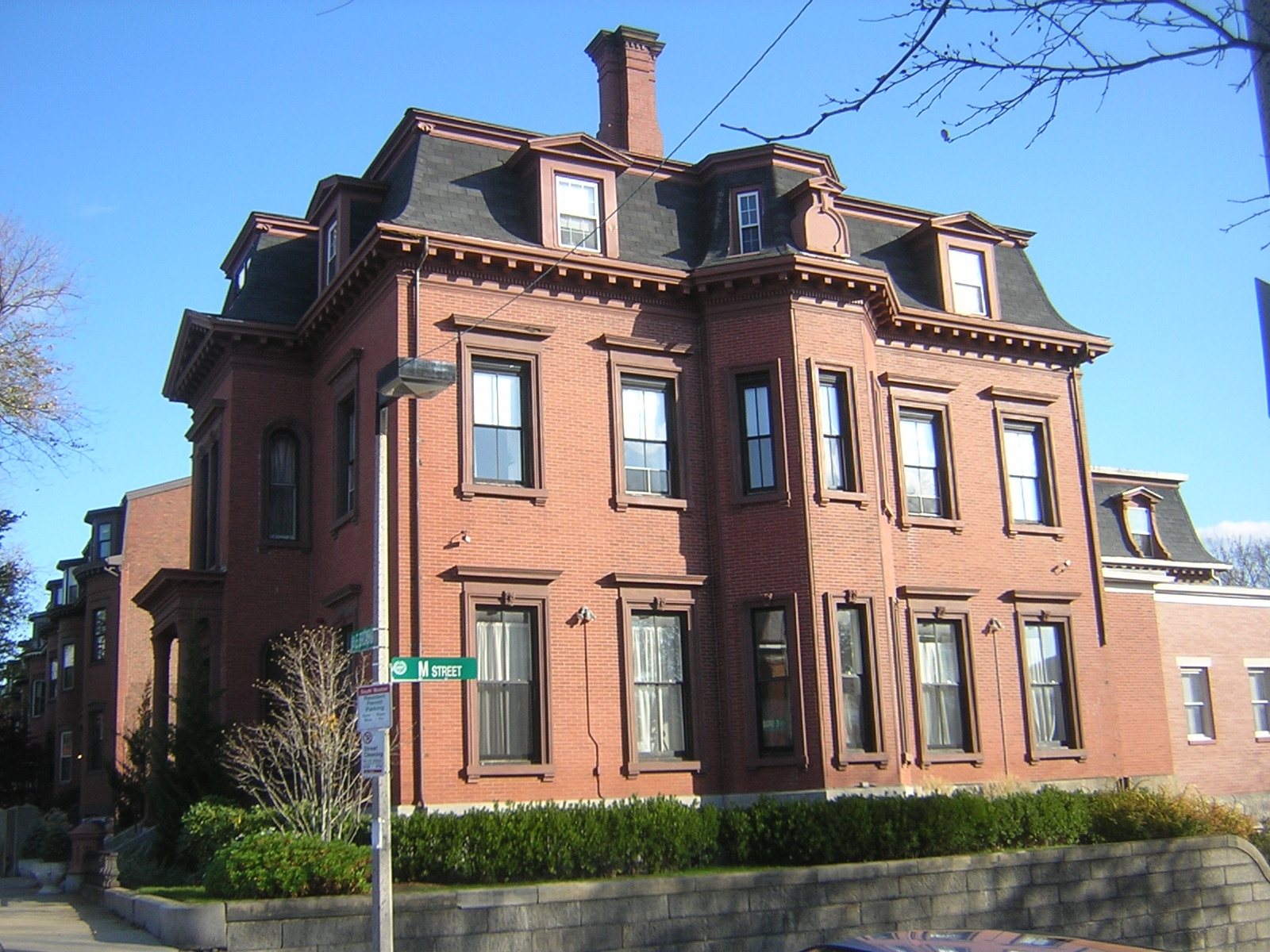

The Harrison Loring House is a historic house at 789 East Broadway in the South Boston neighborhood of Boston, Massachusetts. It is a 2 1/2-story brick mansion, with a mansard roof in the Second Empire style. It has brownstone trim around the windows, a modillioned cornice, and a projecting center section with its entrance sheltered by a shallow portico. It was built in 1865 for Harrison Loring, owner of the City Point Iron Works, a major South Boston shipyard, at which steamships were built in the late 19th century. Loring lived in this house until 1894.

The house was listed on the National Register of Historic Places in 1983 and designated as a Boston Landmark by the Boston Landmarks Commission in 1984

== See also ==
- National Register of Historic Places listings in southern Boston, Massachusetts
