= Roswell Gleason =

American metal goods manufacturer (1799–1887)

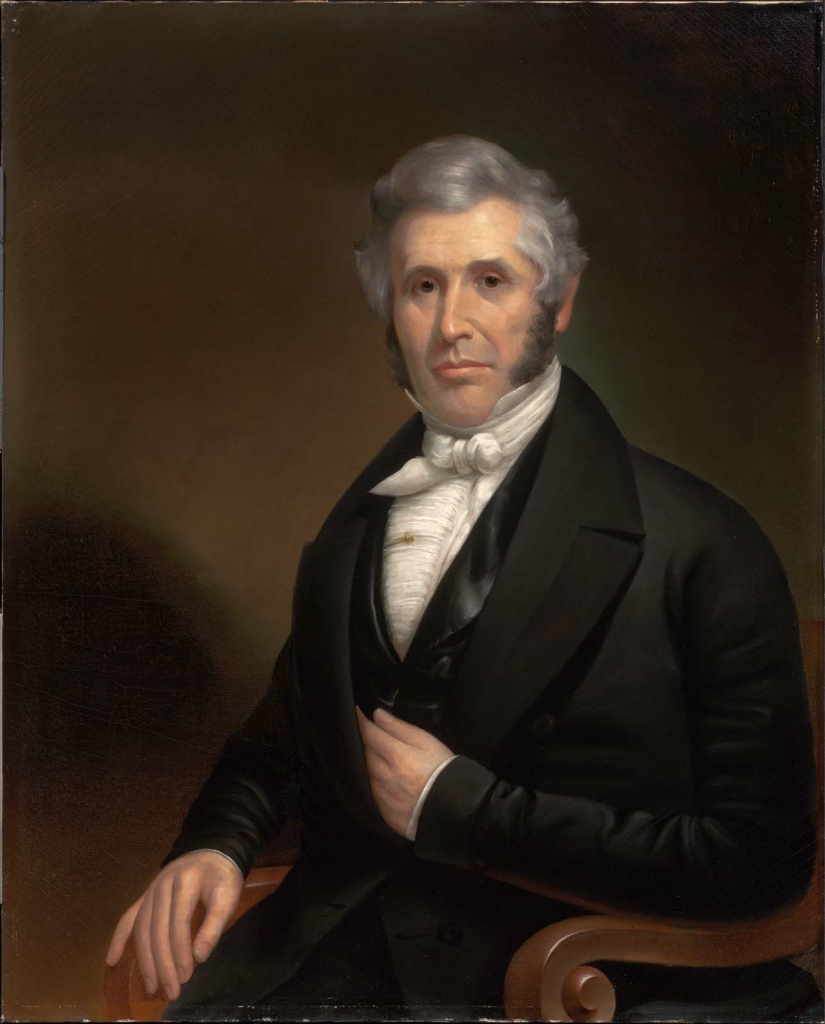
- Gleason, c. 1848
- Born: April 6, 1799; Putney, Vermont
- Died: January 27, 1887 (aged 87); Dorchester, Massachusetts
- Resting place: Codman Burying Ground, Dorchester
- Occupations: Tinsmith; Pewterer; Britannia ware and silver-plate manufacturer
- Years active: 1818–1871
- Known for: Silver-plate, "Magic Caster"

Roswell Gleason (April 6, 1799 – January 27, 1887) was an American manufacturer and entrepreneur who rose from apprentice tinsmith to owner of a large manufacturing concern that initially produced pewter objects for domestic and religious use, and later added Britannia ware and silver-plated goods to its catalog. He was instrumental (possibly with encouragement from his friend Daniel Webster) in bringing the process of silver electroplating to America, creating a new market for less expensive substitutes for luxury goods.

== Early life ==
Gleason was born to Reuben Gleason (1770–1843) and his first wife, Martha, on April 6, 1799, in Putney, Vermont. His father was originally from Massachusetts but moved to a farm in Vermont where Gleason and his eight younger siblings were raised.

== Business development ==
Gleason moved to Dorchester in 1818 and was apprenticed to tinsmith William Wilcox in Dorchester's Four Corners neighborhood. In 1822 he took over the shop after Wilcox's death. The business produced tin and pewter goods for household and ecclesiastical use, such as plates, bowls, tankards, communion sets, candlesticks and oil lamps. By the 1830s, he was also producing Britannia ware.

In 1837, the Massachusetts Charitable Mechanic Association held its first exhibition, a trade fair intended to promote and improve the state of manufacturing in the country. Gleason submitted several award-winning entries.

A variety of Block Tin Wares, wrought and finished in the very best manner; and without competition. A Silver Medal.

— First Exhibition and Fair of the Massachusetts Charitable Mechanic Association, Boston, September 18, 1837

One Case Britannia Ware. Among these articles, we notice some Coffee Urns, of good proportions, and apparently finished equal to the English; Tea Sets; Communion Service, and an assortment of other articles, which bespeak great credit to the makers. Diploma.

— Third Exhibition and Fair of the Massachusetts Charitable Mechanic Association, Boston, September 20, 1841

By 1850, Gleason's sons, Roswell Jr. (1826–1866) and Edward (1829–1863), had joined the business, now known as Roswell Gleason & Sons. Edward traveled to England to study the new technology of electroplating, first patented there in 1840. Silver-plated goods could be produced at a fraction of the cost of those fabricated in coin silver or sterling silver. Gleason's affordable wares quickly found a market among middle-class and upper-class households eager to display their wealth and taste in their homes.

While pewter, a relatively soft metal, had to be cast in molds, Britannia metal could be cast or could be rolled into sheets which were then stamped or spun on a lathe to create holloware. Gleason expanded his factory as new production methods were introduced. He imported electroplating equipment from England and commissioned the world's largest white metal rolling machine, designed by Professor Daniel Treadwell of Harvard College. Catherine Lanford Joy describes the factory:

Gleason’s steam-powered manufactory was divided by process. An 1857 inventory lists the contents of a “Roll and Screw Press Room,” “Drop Press Room,” “Foundry,” “Wash Room,” “Casting Room,” and an “East Britt[annia] room” as well as a “West Britt[annia] room.” There was also a “Brass Factory” on the property. A sketch of Gleason’s showroom building shows an office, chasing room, engine room, and packing room on the first level with the show room and burnishing room above them. A plating and burnishing building connected to this building at the back. The firm employed between 75 and 125 workers throughout the 1850s and 1860s, men and women who were housed nearby.

A former apprentice himself, Gleason continued the practice; many of his employees lived at the factory complex, which was, in effect, a company town with its own shops, housing and meals provided for workers. (Note: One apprentice, B. F. Knox, recalled that he had left Gleason's employ because he did not like Mrs. Gleason's cooking.) He also brought over skilled artisans from Europe. (Note: According to one source, the first silver-plate workers Edward brought over were from Scotland, and they ran a clandestine counterfeiting operation. When Gleason discovered it, he replaced them.)

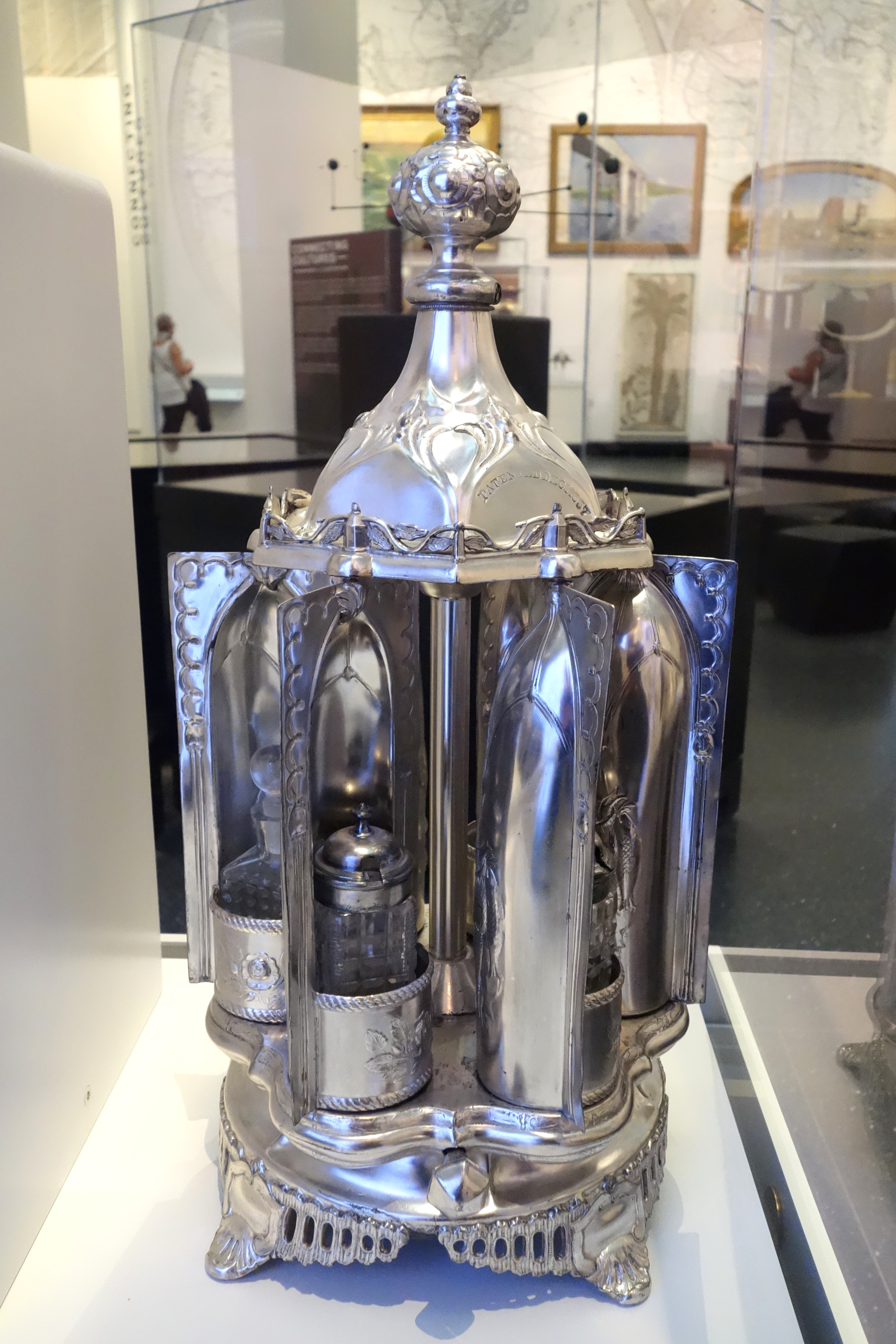
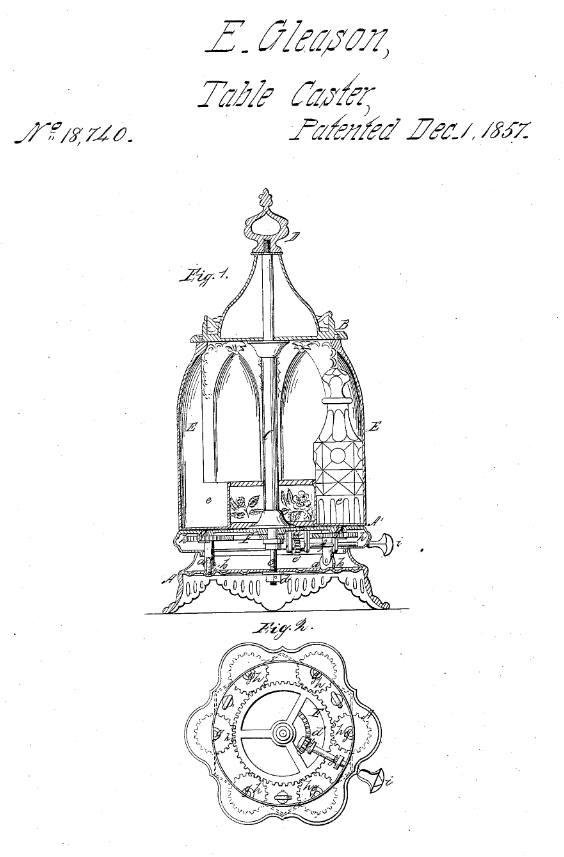
The Magic Caster in silver-plate and the 1857 patent application

Gleason sold goods out of his own Dorchester showroom and through itinerant peddlers, but wholesale orders comprised the bulk of his business. Merchandise was shipped up and down the East coast, although the Civil War curtailed distribution of his products in the South.

After a boiler explosion in 1870 damaged the factory, Gleason, whose sons had died a few years prior, decided to close the business in 1871 and retire.

=== Patents ===
A major factor in Gleason's success was his ability to innovate, catering to a rising middle class clientele with a taste for mechanical gadgetry and the accessories of fine dining. His sons obtained patents for several products, including an ink stand and a cake basket, as well as several variations on the table caster, a device designed to hold condiment containers on the dining table. The 1866 product catalog listed more than sixty types of casters. They were very popular items; in 1844, the Boston and Sandwich Glass Company, which made bottles and jars for casters, ordered 150 dozen caster frames. One of the most elaborate casters concealed condiment bottles behind revolving doors and was cleverly marketed as the "Magic Caster"; an "improved" version added a bell and an egg stand. Catherine Lanford Joy writes, "With its combination of mechanical ingenuity, artistic design, and mysterious effect, Gleason's Magic Caster is quintessentially Victorian."

== Personal life ==
Gleason married Rebecca Tucker Vose (1805–1891) of Milton, Massachusetts on October 13, 1822. They had four children, three of whom lived to adulthood.

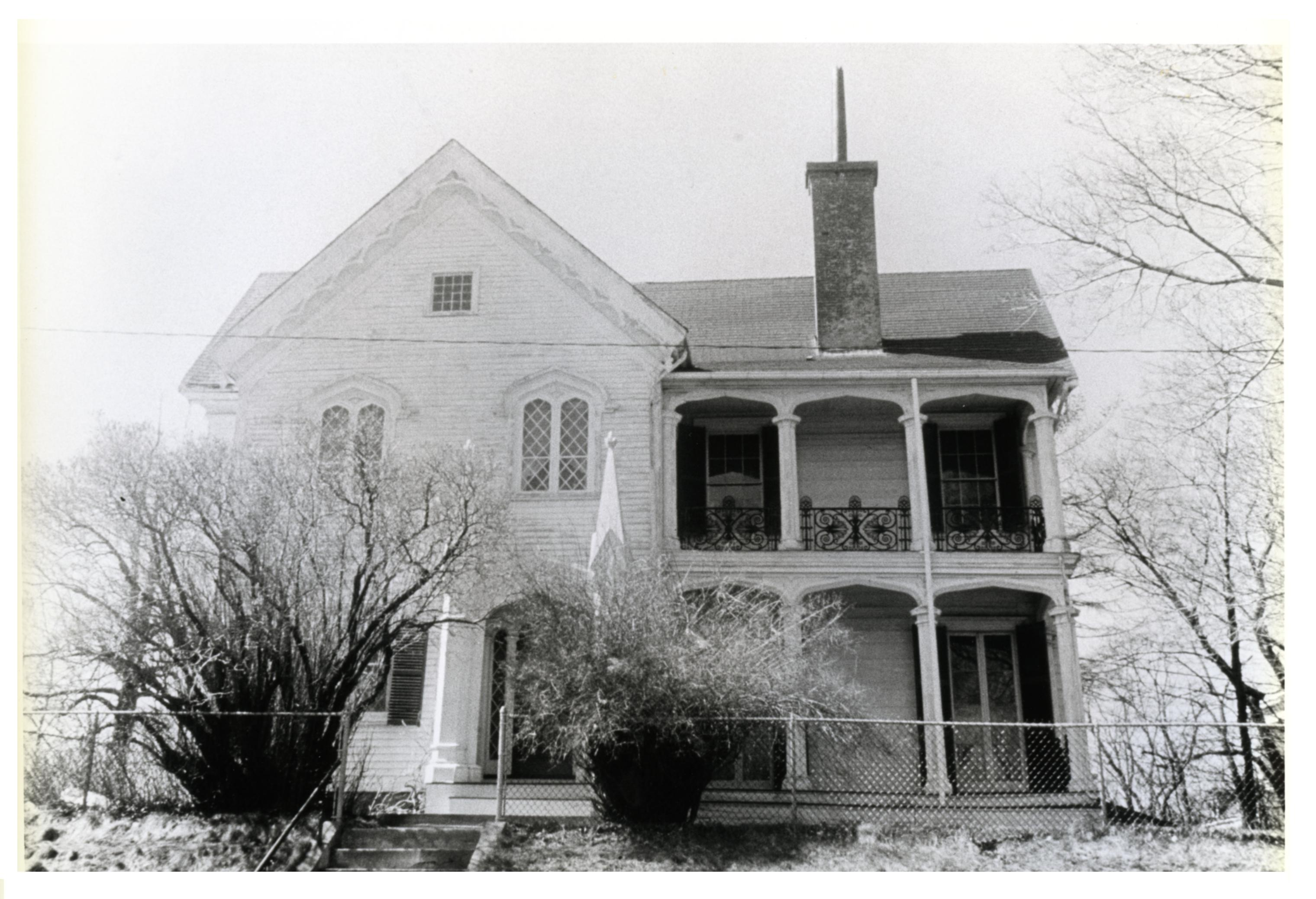
"Lilacs", east facade

Around 1840 Gleason built a house on Washington Street, not far from his factory. The large Gothic Revival-style residence was known as "Lilacs" for the white lilacs propagated from cuttings reputedly taken at Mount Vernon. The town tax assessment of 1850 lists a "mansion house", stable, ice house, and "large factory" along with other outbuildings and houses on 31 acres. The total assessed value of the buildings, land and personal estate was $37,700 (equivalent to $1.46 million in 2025).

Roswell Gleason died on January 27, 1887, in Dorchester, and was buried in the Codman Burying Ground, owned by the Second Church, which he had attended regularly his entire adult life. For many years he had been one of the most prominent as well as popular residents of Dorchester, serving as Captain of the Dorchester Rifle Company and contributing through civil service and financial gifts, particularly to the public schools.

== Legacy ==
Assessing Gleason's impact on manufacturing, historian Catherine Lanford Joy writes:

While Gleason’s firm ceased to exist after his retirement, during the half century that it was in operation, it was highly competitive, stylistically innovative, and immensely productive. His products played an important role in shaping Victorian culture in America.

Works by Gleason are held by many museums, including:

- Museum of Fine Arts, Boston
- Metropolitan Museum of Art
- Rhode Island School of Design
- Yale University Art Gallery
- Art Institute of Chicago
- Brooklyn Museum
- Philadelphia Museum of Art
- Museum of Fine Arts, Houston
- Dallas Museum of Art
- Winterthur
- Currier Museum of Art

"Lilacs" remained in the family relatively unchanged. In 1977 the Boston Landmarks Commission designated the house a Landmark and recommended that the property be nominated to the National Register of Historic Places, stating that the "Roswell Gleason House is perhaps the best extant Boston example of the transition from Greek to Gothic Revival styles in domestic architecture."

That same year the last family member to occupy "Lilacs", Mary V. Bowker, granddaughter of Mary Frances Gleason Vandervoort (1825–1885), sold architectural elements of two rooms along with family heirlooms to the Museum of Fine Arts, Boston. (Note: The museum acquisitions were a combination of gifts from Mary V. Bowker and purchases underwritten by the museum's Period Room Restoration Fund.) The rooms were installed in the museum's new American Wing, which opened in 2010, as "excellent examples of New England taste of a successful industrialist". The house was destroyed by fire in 1982. The land formerly occupied by the factory is now a city park, Mother's Rest, overlooking Dorchester Bay.

== Gallery ==
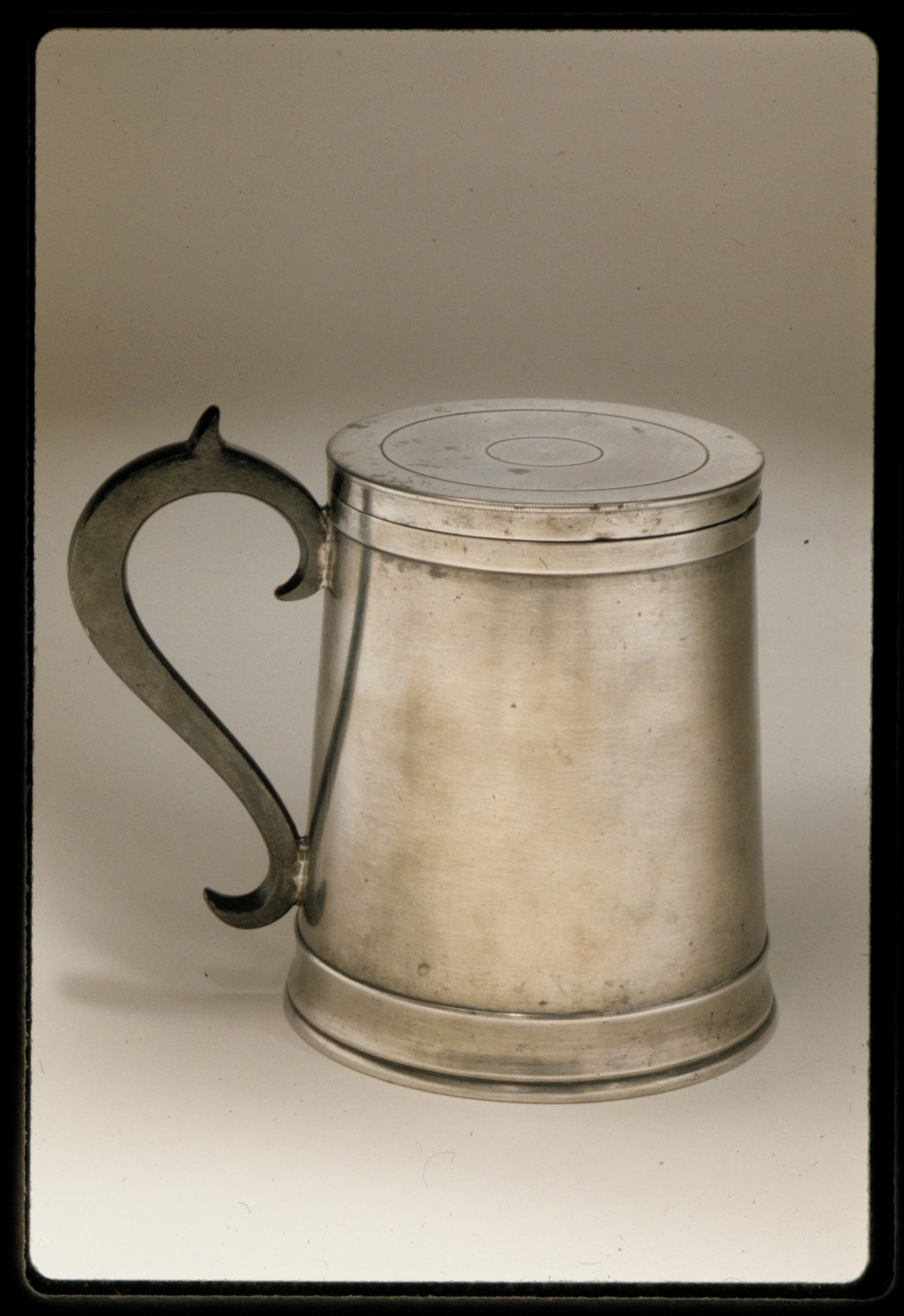
Tankard, c. 1821

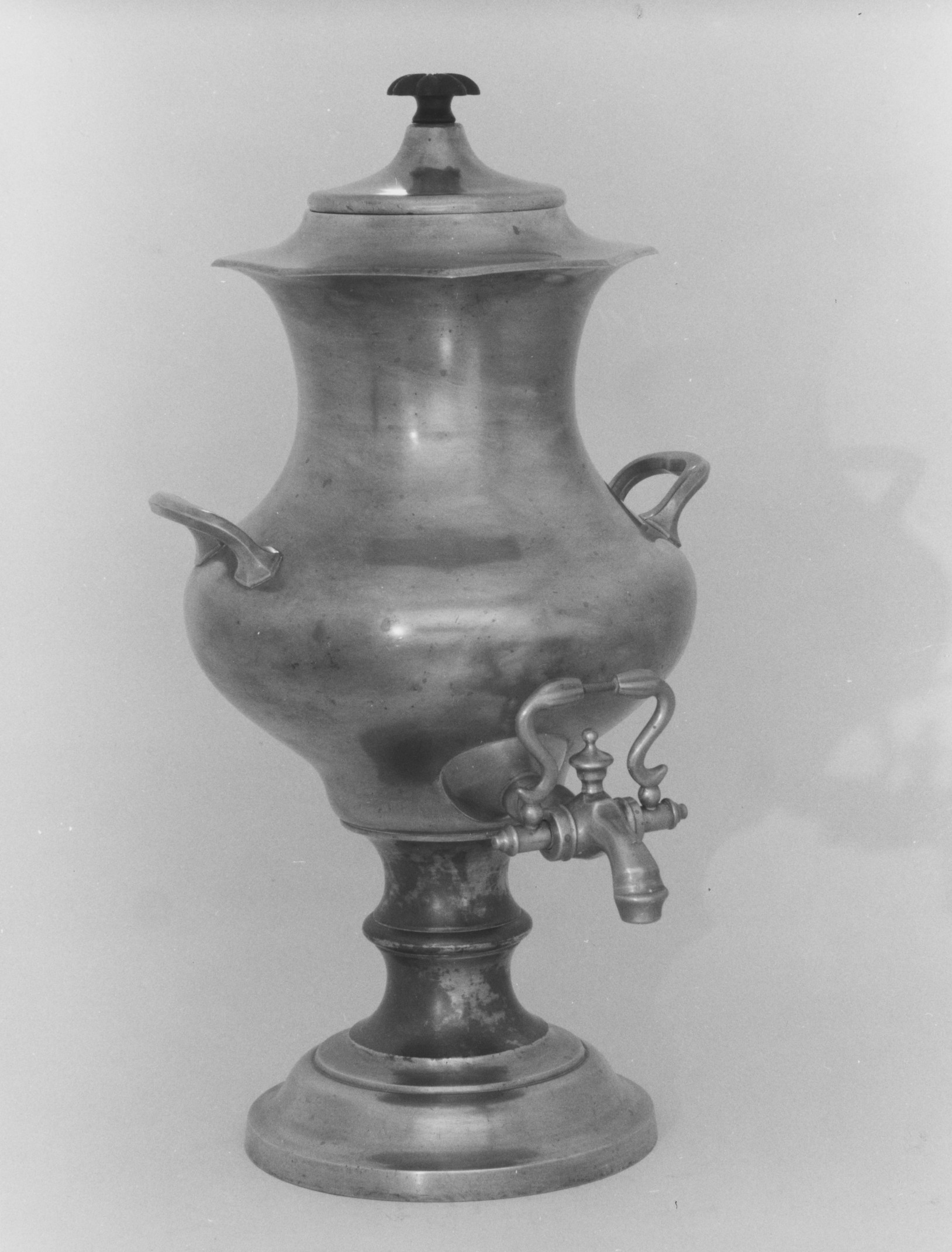
Coffee urn, c. 1840

== Sources ==
- Biographical Sketches of Representative Citizens of the Commonwealth of Massachusetts. Boston: Graves & Steinbarger. 1901.
- Joy, Catherine Lanford (May 2019). Silver and Silverplate in Mid-Nineteenth Century Boston: Obadiah Rich, Newell Harding, and Roswell Gleason (PhD thesis). ProQuest for Yale University. ProQuest 2285295508.
- Orcutt, William Dana (1893). Good Old Dorchester. Cambridge: William Dana Orcutt. OCLC 1045572394.
- Ward, Gerald W. R. (2012). "Period Rooms and the New Art of the Americas Wing of the Museum of Fine Arts, Boston: Reexamination and Reinstallation". Winterthur Portfolio. 46 (2/3): 195–212. doi:10.1086/668296. S2CID 162960058.
- White, John Barber (1909). Wilson, Lillian May (ed.). Genealogy of the descendants of Thomas Gleason of Watertown, Mass. 1607-1909. Haverhill, Mass.: The Nichols Print. LCCN 10000651. OCLC 1045617066.
- The Auditors' Eleventh Printed Report of the Receipts and Expenditures of the Town of Dorchester, Being a General Statement of the Finances of the Town, from February 1, 1848, to February 1, 1849 (Report). Boston: David Clapp. 1849.
- Exhibition and Fair of the Massachusetts Charitable Mechanic Association (Report). Boston: Dutton and Wentworth. 1853 [1837-1853]. OCLC 1021867937.
