= Dorchester Pottery Works =

- U.S. National Register of Historic Places
- Boston Landmark
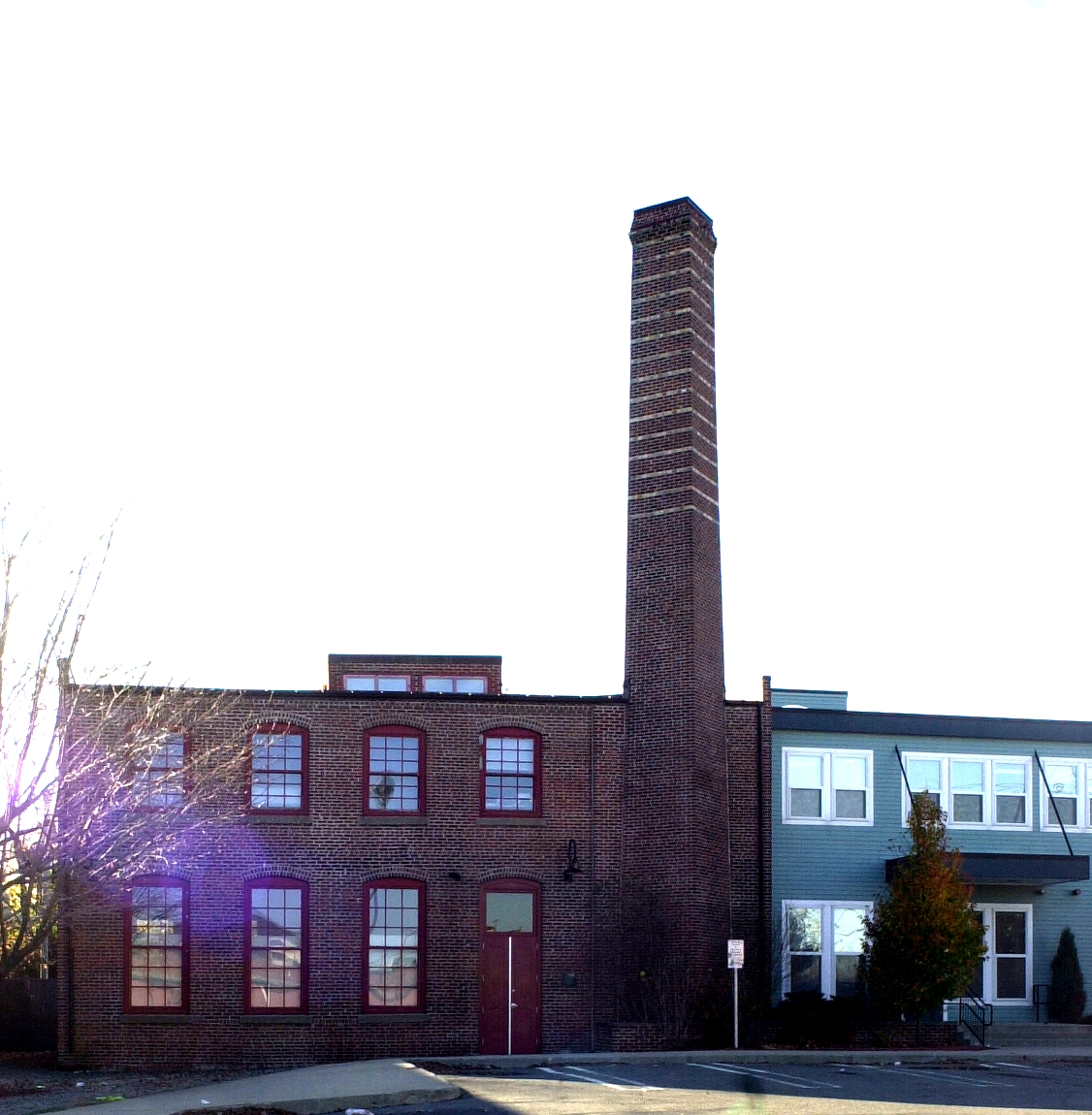

- Location within Massachusetts Location within the United States
- Location: 101-105 Victory Rd., Boston, Massachusetts
- Coordinates: 42°17′50.2″N 71°3′3.5″W
- Area: 0.5 acres (0.20 ha)
- Built: 1914
- NRHP reference No.: 85000318

Significant dates
- Added to NRHP: February 21, 1985
- Designated BOSL: June 24, 1980

Dorchester Pottery Works is a historic site at 101-105 Victory Road in Dorchester, Massachusetts, a neighborhood of Boston. The Dorchester Pottery Works was founded in 1895 by George Henderson and made stoneware. The Dorchester Pottery Works closed in 1979. The building was designated as a Boston Landmark in 1980 and added to the National Register of Historic Places in 1985.

== Description ==
The Dorchester Pottery Works is located in the Dorchester neighborhood of Boston and abuts a sizable shopping center to one side and railroad tracks to the other. The residential neighborhood across the street is largely of frame, later Victorian, single family structures. The Dorchester Pottery Works is now represented by its sole surviving structure, a brick industrial building housing the company's monumental kiln. This kiln building has been vacant for several years and had been boarded up until its recent rehabilitation. The Works formerly included a frame industrial building that was attached to the kiln building, and the Henderson House, which was used as a residence and showroom by the proprietors of the business. Recently, both of these buildings were destroyed.

The Dorchester Pottery Works kiln house is a two-story plus clerestory, five-by-five bay, flat roofed, red brick, industrial building with a red brick chimney approximately 60-feet in height angled into its east wa11. The building is squarish in plan, measures approximately 45 feet by 49 feet, and is about 25 feet high from grade level to roof parapet. Located near the center of a deep and irregularly shaped parcel including 21,730 square feet, the kiln house was formerly attached to the rear of, the now demolished two-story frame, clapboard, industrial building which was approximately 42 feet wide by 69 feet deep and which extended up to the Victory Road street line.

Characterizing the exterior of the kiln building are its segmentally arched windows (the long first floor windows had been fitted with nine-over-nine sash which have been reconstructed after the earlier ones were totally vandalized), broad rectangular ground level entrances on the south and west sides, and concrete lintels and sills. Ornamentation is sparse and limited to the handling of the chimney with contrasting courses of yellow brick and the use of a plain brickwork cornice. Low parapet walls define the roof line on the north and south sides, and a brick roof extension on the north side allowed for the operation of an industrial pulley lift.

The interior of the building is basically an open two-story space extended by a central three-by-four bay clerestory. The second floor functions primarily as a balcony level formed by an opening that is approximately 25 1/2 feet in diameter and edged with curved bolted steel. Steel columns located towards the corners of the building carry the load of the flattened arched tile roof vaults of the second floor and clerestory. The height of the interior measures approximately 14 feet from grade to the second floor and approximately 28 1/2 feet from grade to the roof of the clerestory. . .

Dominating the interior of the building is Dorchester Pottery's circular plan, low-domed, beehive type kiln-which occupies much of the square footage of the ground level. The kiln measures, in its dimensions, approximately 30 feet in diameter and about 12 feet in height from grade to the top of the dome. At grade, the kiln's walls are approximately 4 feet thick and include an encasing wall about 4 feet and 9 inches in height. This outer wall houses nine firing holes and the arched entry to the kiln's interior. The exterior walls of the kiln are girded with horizontal and vertical iron bands to allow for the proper structural expansion and contraction of the kiln during firing and cooling.

Inside, the kiln measures approximately 22 feet in diameter. The interior space is about 10 1/2 feet high under the center of the dome, marked by the location of a small air hole, and about 6 1/2 feet high near the kiln's sides.

Brick shelving lines the inner walls of the kiln which are covered with a shiny surface formed over the years, through the escaping of vaporized glazes during firing. A grid of heat resistant tiles on the kiln's floor permits the conduction of heat, fire, and gases through an underground flu to the chimney which protrudes out of a corner of the building.

Also included on the site of the Dorchester Pottery Works, on a small parcel of 4,303 square feet, was the Henderson House, the residence of the company's founder and second generation owner/operators. Unfortunately, on April 12, 1980, this Queen Anne Style, clapboard, two-story plus attic, front facing gable roofed house was destroyed by fire.

== History ==
Founded in 1895 by George Henderson, Dorchester Pottery Works successfully produced commercial and industrial stoneware for many years. Henderson came from New Haven, Connecticut, where he had been a partner in the S.L. Pewtress Pottery since 1884 in the production of Henderson and O'Halloran wares.

Dorchester Pottery's wares evolved over the years from primarily agricultural products to decorated tablewares. Mash feeders and chicken fountains were cast from molds for the farmer. Acid pots and dipping baskets were in demand by jewelry manufacturers, and Henderson's popular foot warmer was known as a "porcelain pig." In 1940, Dorchester Pottery's line of distinctive gray and blue tableware was introduced. It was shaped on the potter's wheel. It is called slipware with a so-called Bristol glaze.

In 1914, Mr. Henderson built an enormous beehive kiln 28-feet in diameter of his own design made of unmortared bricks. When it was carefully stacked with two or three freight car loads of unfired pottery, the opening was sealed and the kiln was slowly heated with 15 tons of coal and four cords of wood to a temperature of 2500-3000 degrees Fahrenheit. After days of cooling, the door would be opened, brick by brick, and the fired pieces removed. The entire process took about one week to complete.

In the 1920s, Henderson purchased finished pottery from other companies, such as containers by Joseph Middleby Jr., jugs by H.A. Johnson, and household items including bean pots and casserole dishes from other suppliers. At its peak in the 1920s the Dorchester Pottery Works employed 28 potters. By the 1950s when the Pottery turned out 1,700 distinct items twenty-five percent was tableware, and by the 1960s tableware was one hundred percent of the production.

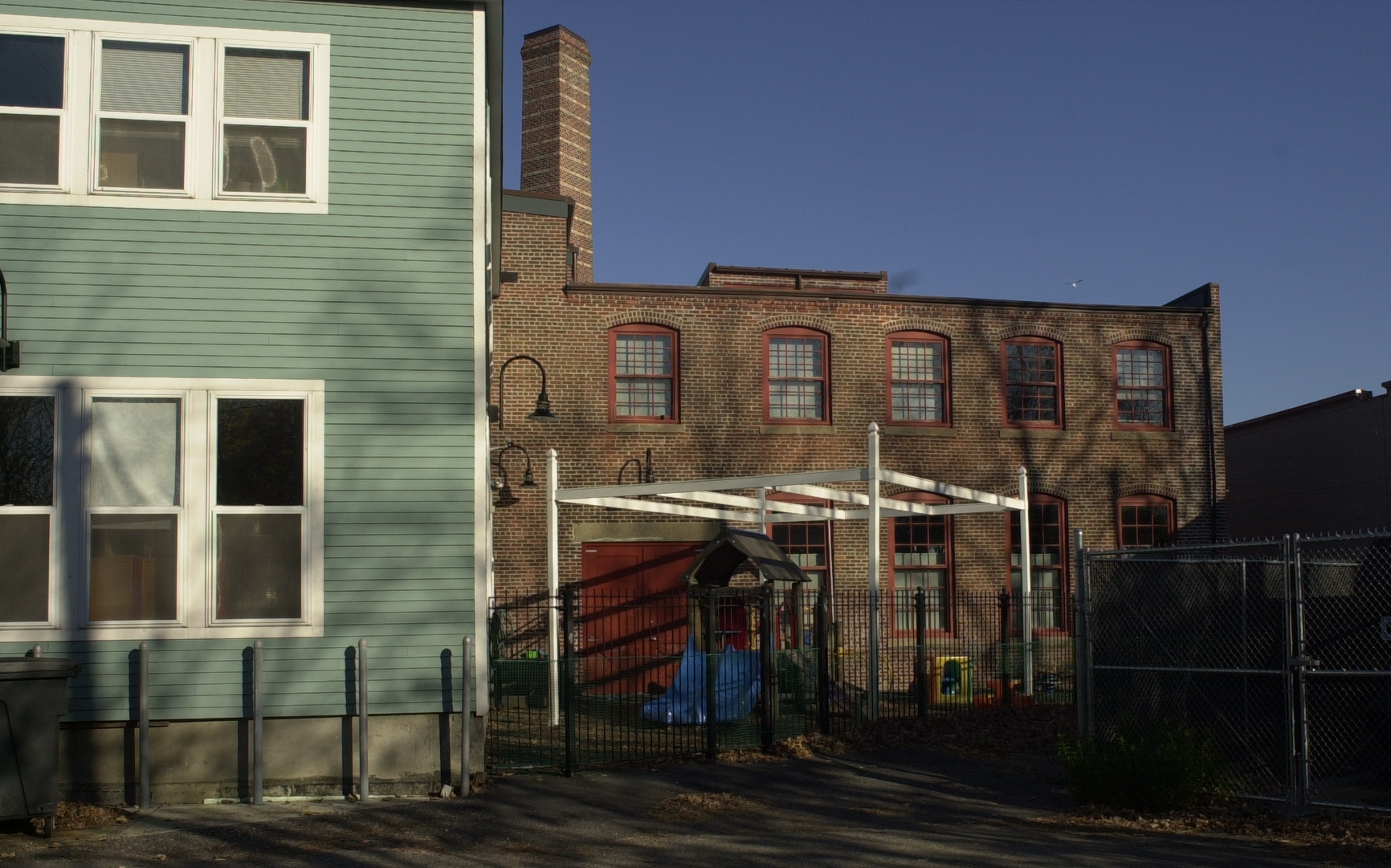

Twenty three people were employed by the pottery works in 1921, mainly from Dorchester. When Henderson died in 1928, his son, Charles, and daughter-in-law, Ethel Hill Henderson, took over the business. George died in 1967, and Ethel continued until her death in 1971 with the help of her brother, Charles Allen Hill, and her sister, Lilly Yeaton. Ethel had been a clothing and design teacher at Dorchester High School. She became superintendent of the kiln, and her two children, George and Lillian, assisted in the family business. But the Great Depression took its toll, and the sales of commercial stoneware suffered. Ethel began to decorate the stoneware with motifs of old New England, and her brother, Charles, added new mixing color techniques from his experience in an earlier career as a chemistry teacher. Decorators whose names may be found on the pottery include Charles Hill, Nando Ricci, Joseph McCune, Phil Spear, Ronald Brakee, Robert Trotter, Jackie Burn Callder, Rhoda Ricci and Knesseth Denison. Ethel died in 1971, and some pieces after that date are signed I.M.E.H.H. (In Memorial Ethel Hill Henderson).

Although the handcrafted pots continued to attract attention, they could not compete in the commercial market. The last firing of the big beehive kiln took place in 1965, and after that smaller gas and later electric kilns were used until the pottery works closed in 1979. Yet the diversified production of the Dorchester Pottery Works and the fact that it was a family-run operation helped it to stay open longer than other commercial New England potteries such as Bennington, Dedham and Hampshire. Some of its products were: storage jars from 5 to 75 gallons, beanpots both for restaurant and home use, cheese jars, foot-warmers, plates, platters, pitchers, pots, planters, bowls, casseroles, cuspidors, vases, flower baskets, bird baths, Toby jugs, cookie jars, steins, mugs, demitasse cups and saucers as well as special-order custom designs.

Some of the common designs of the Pottery included: blueberry, cherry, pear, plum, clematis, cow, codfish, colonial lace, lily of the valley, pine cone, pussy willow, ships, stripes, scrolls, sperm whale, and sponge patterns. These designs were painted with the blue and white slip, and sometimes shallow scraffito work was added. Special orders sometimes used Bayberry green or Morocco gold slip. All these pieces received a clear seal coat of the Bristol glaze. Most of the Pottery's pieces bore some kind of identification, either a paper label or a stamp in the slip.

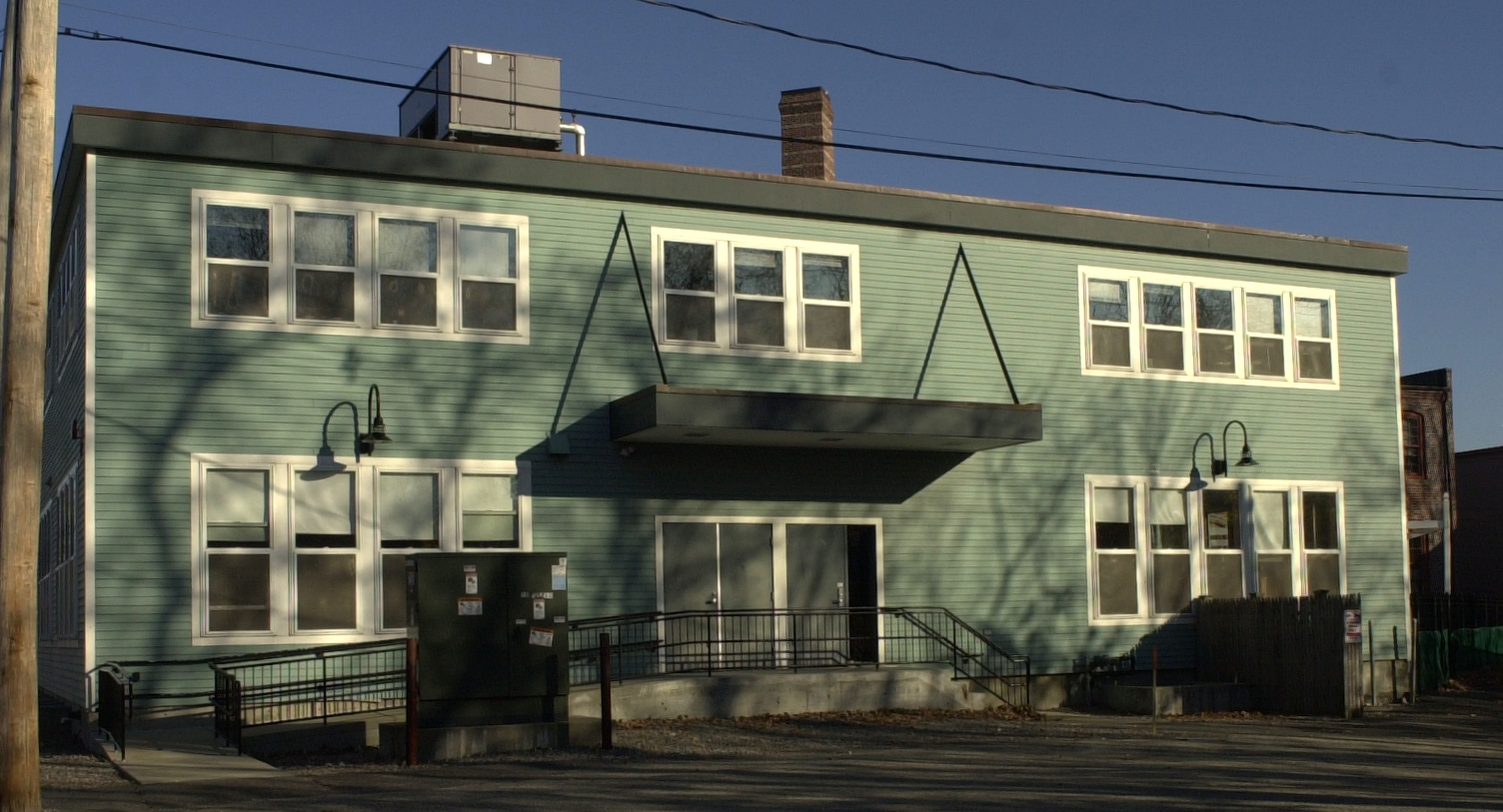

Until 1971, all the clay used at the Pottery Works came from South Amboy, NJ, and the cobalt used for the blue slip decoration came from Germany. From 1972 the clay came from Ohio. For more than 80 years the company used the same apple wood drying boards to stack greenware in the drying room. These were the same boards used by the Boston and Sandwich Glass Company on Cape Cod, a defunct company that Henderson bought in whole. The method of production changed very little over time. It was a small factory whose products were handcrafted. Even the jiggering of forms utilized older labor-intensive technology that other commercial potteries had long since abandoned for automated machine jigger units. Pieces were mostly hand-formed, handles were applied individually, pieces were hand dipped in glazes, and shapes were developed to meet custom orders.

Fire destroyed the family residence and main production building in 1980. What remained of the pottery works was for nearly twenty years a single boarded up building with a tall smoke stack at the intersection of Mill Street and Victory Road. Soon after the Pottery Works closed, members of the Clam Point Neighborhood Association organized to buy and preserve the kiln building and to create a Dorchester Pottery Museum at the original site. When that endeavor ended without success, the organization's records were presented to the University of Massachusetts, and the Dorchester Pottery exhibit was given to the care and maintenance of the Dorchester Historical Society. In 2001 Bay Cove Human Services acquired the property and renovated the building for its own use, keeping the kiln room and the kiln itself intact for community exhibitions.

== See also ==
- National Register of Historic Places listings in southern Boston, Massachusetts

== Bibliography ==
- Boston Landmarks Commission, Dorchester Pottery Works Study Report, 1980.
- Boston Redevelopment Authority, ?Dorchester, Fields Corner District Profile?. 1979
- Brady, Phillip, "Dorchester Stoneware Pottery Last in America", Boston Sunday Globe, November 6, 1955, 73.
- Bromley, George W. Atlas of Boston, Vol.5: Dorchester. Philadelphia, 1884, 1894, 1898, 1904, 1910, 1918, 1933.
- Doucette, Russell, (Ceramics' Department, Massachusetts College of Art) Conversation regarding the Dorchester Pottery Works. April 15, 1980.
- Evans, Paul. "Stoneware and the Dorchester Pottery", Western Collector, May, 1968, 7–11.
- Gates, William. (Curator, East Liverpool Museum of Ceramics, Ohio) Conversation regarding beehive kilns, April 17, 1980.
- Kovel, Ralph and Terry. The Kovel?s Collector?s Guide to American Art Pottery. New York, 1974.
- Loveday, Amos. (Ohio Historical Center, Columbus, Ohio) Conversation regarding beehive kilns. April 14, 1980.
- Michael, George. The Treasury of New England Antiques. New York, 1969.
- Myer, Susan. (Ceramics Department, Smithsonian Institution). Conversation regarding beehive kilns. April 15, 1980.
- Oberg, Doris. Conversation regarding the Dorchester Pottery Works, subject of illustrated lecture. April 17, 1980.
- Pollan, Rosalind. ?Harrison Square Report.? Boston Landmarks Commission Project Completion Report, July 1979.
- Ray, Marcia. An Encyclopedia of Pottery and Porcelain for the American Collector. New York, 1974.
- Roueche, Berton, "Reporter At Large, The Last Lap", The New Yorker, March 13, 1954.
- Slade, Marilyn Myers. ?For a Legend, (Dorchester Pottery), A New Life?? Boston Herald Magazine, October 12, 1979.
- United States Department of Commerce. Bureau of Foreign and Domestic Commerce. The Pottery Industry. Washington, D.C., 1915.
- Watkins, Laura Woodside. Early New England Potters and Their Wares. Cambridge, Massachusetts, 1950.
- Dorchester Pottery Exhibition, Joseph Carriero Gallery. Boston, 1981. Presented on website www.johnbaymore.com effective 11/4/2002.
- Duffy, Mark and Elizabeth Mock. The Dorchester Pottery Works, 1895–1979. Dorchester: Dorchester Pottery Museum, 1983.
- Michael, George. The Treasury of New England Antiques. New York: Galahad Books, 1969.
- Royka, Paul. Fireworks: New England Art Pottery of the Arts & Crafts Movement. Atglen, PA: Schiffer Publishing, 1997.
- Simpson, Richard V. "Dorchester Pottery." In Antiques & Collecting, v. 98, no. 11, January, 1994, p. 34-37, 44.
- The Archives and Special Collections Department, Healey Library, University of Massachusetts Boston has records of the Dorchester Pottery Works for the period 1906-1961 and, for the period of 1980–1983, has records of the Dorchester Pottery Museum, Inc., an organization of Dorchester residents who were interested in the preservation of the site and history of the Dorchester Pottery works. While this group was successful in obtaining a Boston Landmarks Designation for the building, they were not successful in purchasing the site for a museum. The group then turned its efforts to preserving the history of the Works, and financed the processing of the records of the Works, mounted an exhibition at the Library of the University of Massachusetts Boston, and sponsored a permanent display of Dorchester Pottery, both decorative and industrial, at the Dorchester Historical Society. The Archives and Special Collections Department at Healey Library also has photographs in addition to those seen on this web site and has acquired the Larsen Family Collection, a collection of hundreds of pieces of Dorchester Pottery donated by Kris and Sharon Larsen in 2003.
