= Hayden Building (Boston) =

- U.S. National Register of Historic Places
- Boston Landmark
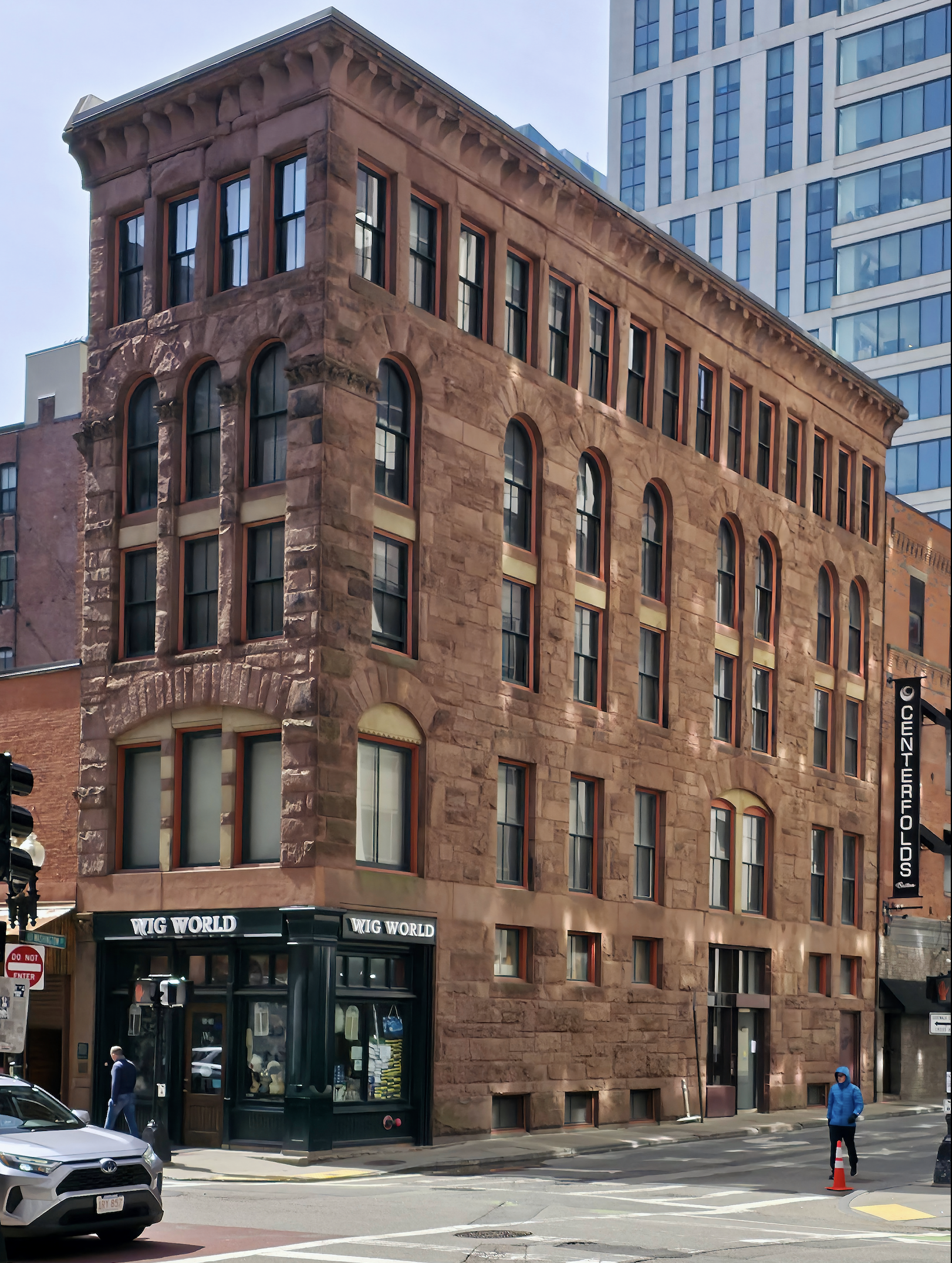

- Location within Boston Location within Massachusetts Location within the United States
- Location: 681–683 Washington St., Boston, Massachusetts
- Coordinates: 42°21′5.18″N 71°3′46.65″W
- Built: 1875
- Architect: Henry Hobson Richardson; Norcross Bros.
- Architectural style: Romanesque
- MPS: Boston Theatre MRA
- NRHP reference No.: 80000446

Significant dates
- Added to NRHP: December 9, 1980
- Designated BOSL: July 5, 1978

The Hayden Building is a historic building at 681–683 Washington Street in Boston, Massachusetts.

The building was built in 1875 and added to the National Register of Historic Places in 1980 as well as designated a Boston Landmark in 1977. Designed to act as commercial retail space, this four story brownstone building shows little of the ornamentation generally associated with Henry Hobson Richardson. It is the last surviving commercial retail building designed by Richardson in Boston. The building is in Boston's Chinatown neighborhood.

== Description ==
The Hayden Building was the first commercial building built in Richardson's signature "Richardsonian Romanesque," with its quarry-faced ashlar and round-arched fenestration. Countless commercial structures in the late 19th century and early 20th century were later built in this style, but this is the only surviving commercial structure built by Richardson himself. It is constructed of Longmeadow brownstone and is sparsely detailed with granite lintels and arches.

== Background ==
This building was not recorded as a Henry Hobson Richardson building until work done by architectural and landscape historian Cynthia Zaitzevsky made note of it in 1973. Previous summaries of Richardson's works relied on office books. This building was built by the Richardson family and was not charged an architectural or design fee. This building replaced a drugstore that exploded on this site in 1875.

== Restoration ==
Historic Boston Incorporated acquired the building in 1995 and completed a total exterior restoration to repair fire damage. Work was done by the architectural firm Bruner/Cott and Preservation Carpentry students at the North Bennet Street School. Damaged structural stonework was replaced using latex molded cast stone replicas from other parts of the building. Brownstone lintels and columns were replaced where necessary.

In 2011, Boston architectural firm CUBE design + research was commissioned to complete a comprehensive restoration and conversion into multi-family housing.

== See also ==
- National Register of Historic Places listings in northern Boston, Massachusetts
- Combat Zone, Boston
