= Boston Landmarks Commission =

Municipal government agency in Massachusetts

Commission overview
- Formed: 1975; 51 years ago
- Jurisdiction: Boston, Massachusetts, U.S.
- Headquarters: 20 City Hall Avenue, 3rd Floor, Boston, Massachusetts; 42.3581°N 71.05887°W
- Commission executive: Kathy Kottaridis, executive director
- Parent Commission: Office of Historic Preservation
- Website: www.boston.gov/departments/landmarks-commission

The Boston Landmarks Commission (BLC) is a historic preservation agency for the city of Boston, Massachusetts. The commission was created by state legislation in 1975. It is part of the city's Office of Historic Preservation.

== History ==
Urban renewal in the United States started with the Housing Act of 1949, part of the "Fair Deal" program put forward by President Harry Truman. In Boston, almost a third of the old city was demolished, including the historic West End, to make way for low- and moderate-income high-rises, and new government and commercial buildings.

The Boston Landmarks Commission was created by the state legislature in 1975. It was formed in response to the mass demolitions, particularly the demolition of the Jordan Marsh Building on Washington Street. Built in the 1860s, the ornate building featured a well-known corner clock tower designed by Nathaniel Jeremiah Bradlee. Along with an entire row of annex buildings, the building was torn down in 1975 and replaced by a new building. Public outrage and grass roots protests influenced preservation legislation and sparked preservation action.

There are now over 8,000 landmarked properties in Boston.

== Responsibilities ==
The chief responsibilities of the Landmark Commission include identifying historic resources through preservation surveys, protecting and recognizing historic properties through designation, and preserving designated Landmarks through the design review process.

The BLC also administers Article 85 Demolition Delay for the entire city of Boston. Whenever a building proposed to be demolished is determined by BLC staff to be significant, the public is invited to testify at a public hearing. If the BLC invokes a 90-day "demolition delay" as a result, there is an opportunity for the community to participate in discussions with the developer and explore alternatives to demolition.

The commission meets twice a month on second and fourth Tuesdays. A design review starts a few hours prior to the business portion at every fourth Tuesday hearing. Applicants propose changes to a landmark by presenting at the hearing, and the public is invited to comment.

== Commissioners ==
Commissioners are nominated by professional and neighborhood organizations, and appointed by the Mayor of Boston. Most are also confirmed by the Boston City Council. All commissioner positions are voluntary. There are 85 commissioner slots among the Boston Landmarks Commission and the 10 local historic commissions, although BLC commissioners also hold slots on local commissions.

== See also ==
- Boston Landmark
