= National Register of Historic Places listings in Lexington, Massachusetts =

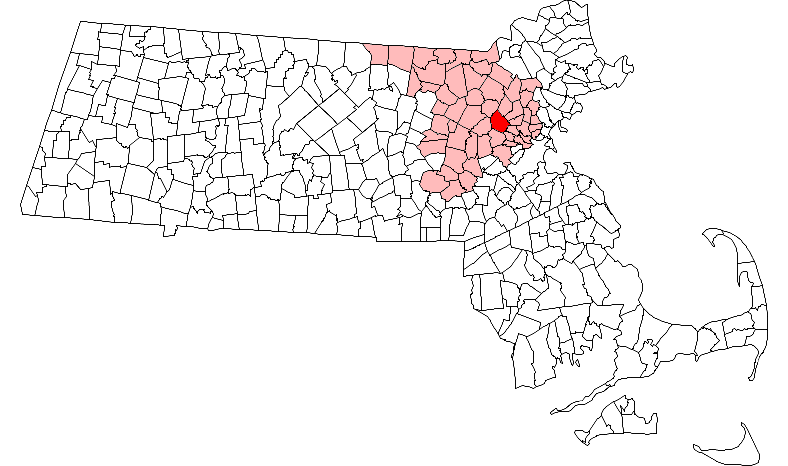
Location of Lexington in Middlesex County and Massachusetts

This is a listing of places in Lexington, Middlesex County, in the U.S. state of Massachusetts, that are listed in the National Register of Historic Places.

Contents: Counties in Massachusetts

Barnstable | Berkshire | Bristol | Dukes | Essex | Franklin | Hampden | Hampshire | Middlesex | Nantucket | Norfolk | Plymouth | Suffolk | Worcester

This National Park Service list is complete through NPS recent listings posted May 1, 2026.

== Current listings ==
	Name on the Register	Image	Date listed	Location	Description
1	Buckman Tavern	Buckman Tavern	October 15, 1966 (#66000137)	Hancock St., on the eastern side of Lexington Green; 42°26′57″N 71°13′49″W	National Historic Landmark
2	Gen. Samuel Chandler House	Gen. Samuel Chandler House	April 13, 1977 (#77000176)	8 Goodwin Rd. 42°27′04″N 71°13′45″W	
3	Follen Community Church	Follen Community Church	April 30, 1976 (#76000242)	755 Massachusetts Ave. 42°25′47″N 71°12′27″W	
4	Franklin School	Franklin School	September 25, 2009 (#09000437)	7 Stedman Rd. 42°25′41″N 71°13′46″W	
5	Hancock School	Hancock School	August 22, 1975 (#75000261)	33 Forest St. 42°26′50″N 71°13′56″W	
6	Hancock-Clarke House	Hancock-Clarke House	July 17, 1971 (#71000895)	36 Hancock St. 42°27′13″N 71°13′43″W	National Historic Landmark
7	Lexington Green	Lexington Green	October 15, 1966 (#66000767)	Massachusetts and Hancock Sts. 42°26′58″N 71°13′53″W	National Historic Landmark
8	John Mason House	John Mason House	March 9, 1990 (#90000172)	1303 Massachusetts Ave. 42°26′28″N 71°12′54″W	
9	M.H. Merriam and Company	M.H. Merriam and Company	February 18, 2009 (#09000033)	7–9 Oakland St. 42°26′56″N 71°13′37″W	
10	Metropolitan State Hospital	Metropolitan State Hospital	January 21, 1994 (#93001482)	475 Trapelo Rd. 42°24′14″N 71°12′40″W	Extends into Belmont and Waltham
11	Peacock Farm Historic District	Peacock Farm Historic District	November 21, 2012 (#12000949)	1-6 Compton Cir., 1-5 Mason St., 2-53 Peacock Farm Rd., 4-17 Trotting Horse Dr. 42°25′15″N 71°12′13″W	
12	Sanderson House and Munroe Tavern	Sanderson House and Munroe Tavern	April 26, 1976 (#76000248)	1314 and 1332 Massachusetts Ave. 42°26′30″N 71°13′00″W	
13	Warren E. Sherburne House	Warren E. Sherburne House	December 2, 1977 (#77000178)	11 Percy Rd. 42°26′32″N 71°13′13″W	
14	Simonds Tavern	Simonds Tavern	October 14, 1976 (#76000251)	331 Bedford St. 42°28′03″N 71°14′36″W	
15	Six Moon Hill Historic District	Six Moon Hill Historic District	January 19, 2016 (#15000981)	4, 8 Bird Hill & 1-40 Moon Hill Rds, 16, 24 Swan Ln. 42°25′23″N 71°12′42″W	
16	Stone Building	Stone Building	April 30, 1976 (#76000252)	735 Massachusetts Ave. 42°25′46″N 71°12′26″W	
17	US Post Office-Lexington Main	US Post Office-Lexington Main	June 26, 1986 (#86001377)	1661 Massachusetts Ave. 42°26′49″N 71°13′32″W	
