= Hose House No. 2 (Beverly, Massachusetts) =

- U.S. National Register of Historic Places
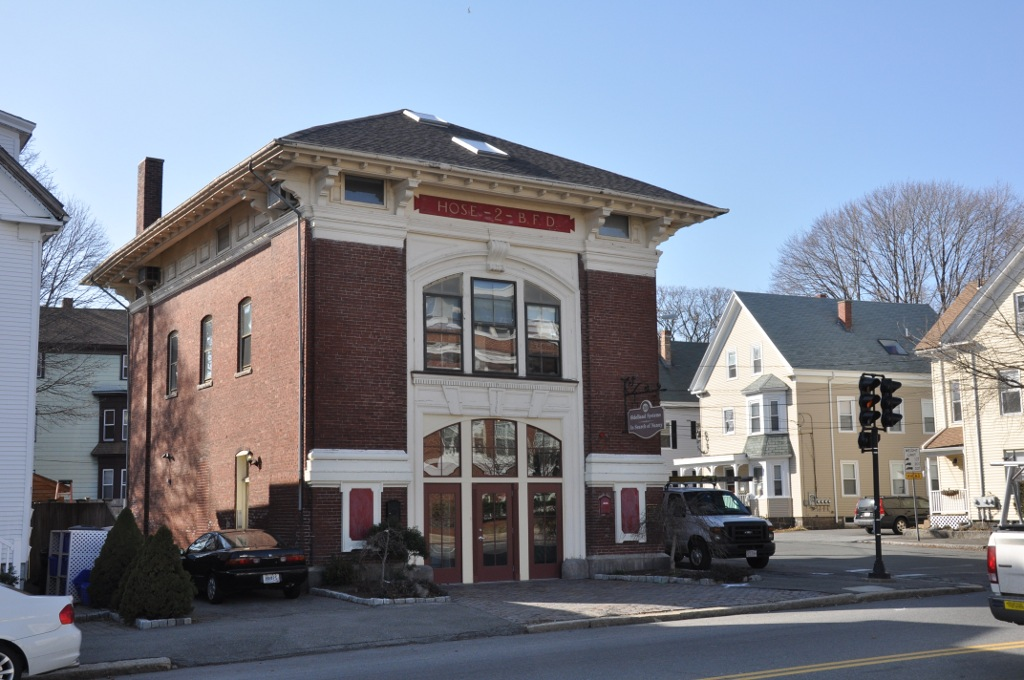

- Location within Massachusetts Location within the United States
- Location: 30 Rantoul Street, Beverly, Massachusetts
- Coordinates: 42°32′35″N 70°53′9″W
- Built: 1905
- Architect: Kilham & Hopkins
- Architectural style: Late 19th and 20th Century Revivals
- NRHP reference No.: 86001461
- Added to NRHP: July 3, 1986

Hose House No. 2 is a historic firestation in Beverly, Massachusetts. It now houses a wireless telecommunication systems company.

The building was constructed in 1905. It was designed by Kilham & Hopkins in a French Renaissance style. In addition to the traditional brass pole by which firemen reached the ground floor from the upper chambers, it also featured an electrical system which automatically turned on the lights when an alarm was sounded. The building has one garage bay, and a hip roof with ornately decorated and bracketed eaves.

The building was listed on the National Register of Historic Places in 1986.

== See also ==
- National Register of Historic Places listings in Essex County, Massachusetts
