= Atlantic Heights Development =

- U.S. National Register of Historic Places
- U.S. Historic district
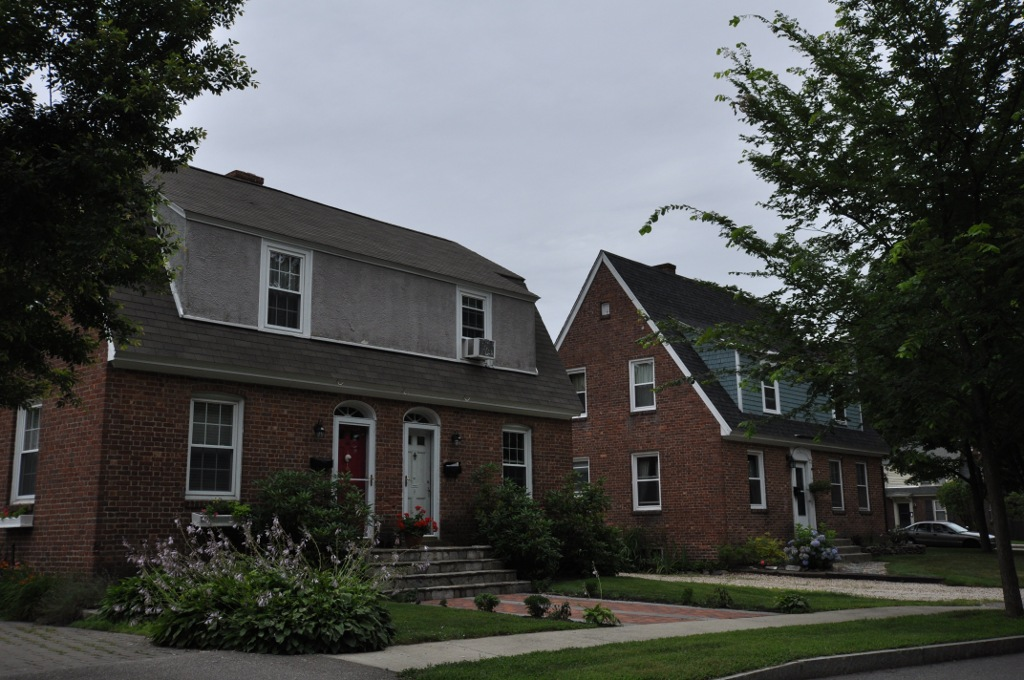

- Location within New Hampshire Location within the United States
- Location: Concord, Crescent, Falkland, Kearsarge, Porpoise, Preble, Raleigh and Saratoga Ways, Portsmouth, New Hampshire
- Coordinates: 43°5′31″N 70°46′20″W
- Area: 80 acres (32 ha)
- Built: 1918
- Architect: Kilham & Hopkins
- Architectural style: Colonial Revival
- NRHP reference No.: 06000869
- Added to NRHP: September 20, 2006

The Atlantic Heights Development is a historic company-built worker subdivision in Portsmouth, New Hampshire. Bounded by I-95, the Piscataqua River, and the tracks of the Boston and Maine Railroad, this small neighborhood was built in 1918–1920 to meet housing demand for workers at the Atlantic Company Shipyard, located just to the south, and served as a prototype for later residential subdivisions. It was listed on the National Register of Historic Places in 2006.

== Description and history ==
Upon the outbreak of World War I, the United States federal government sought to ramp up production of shipping of all types, particularly for international freight. In response to this demand, the Atlantic Corporation acquired Freeman's Point in Portsmouth (now the location of an oil terminal, just south of I-95), then the site of an old paper mill. The government agency overseeing the construction effort provided over $1 million in funding to provide housing for workers at this shipyard. The compact neighborhood built to the north of the shipyard was developed between May 1918 and January 1919, creating a self-contained village with houses, parks, and shops. The project was designed by Kilham & Hopkins of Boston, Massachusetts, who had already designed several similar projects. The project was documented in architectural journals of the period, providing a measure of influence on subsequent residential development practices.

The historic district is located about one mile north of downtown Portsmouth, and is bounded on the south by the I-95 right of way, the west by the Boston and Maine tracks, and the north and east by a bend in the Piscataqua River. The development covers about 80 acres (32 ha), and includes more than 120 houses, as well as a few small parks, a school building, and a shop. The surviving houses are all single and two-family houses, built in one of seven different designs. Later alterations include the construction of small garages. The original development also included a number of six-family apartments and dormitory-style housing units; these were demolished to make way for the I-95 corridor.

== See also ==
- National Register of Historic Places listings in Rockingham County, New Hampshire
- New Hampshire Historical Marker No. 286: The Atlantic Heights Neighborhood
