= First Congregational Church of Hyde Park =

Church in Boston, Massachusetts, US

- U.S. National Register of Historic Places
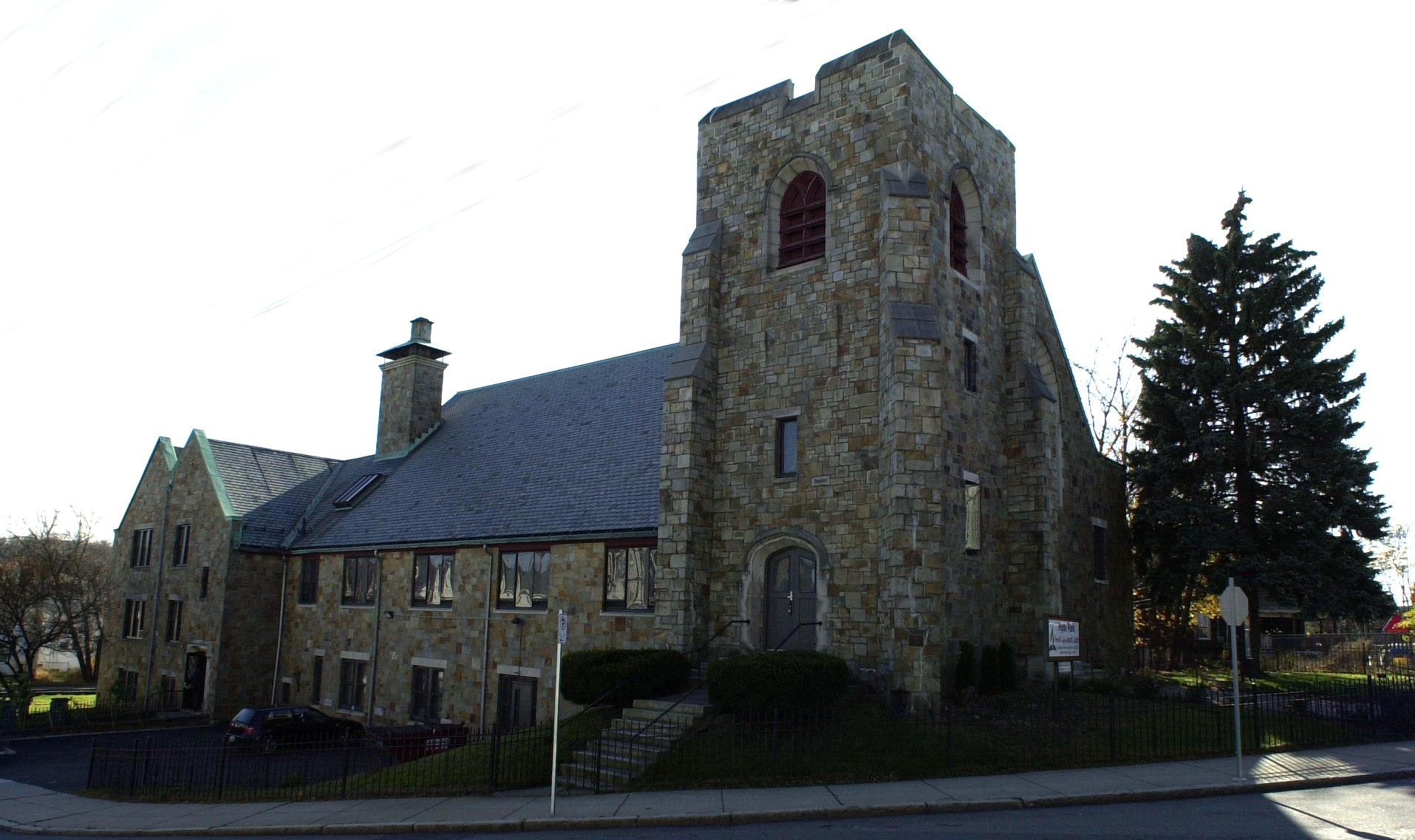

- Location within Massachusetts Location within the United States
- Location: 6 Webster St., Boston, Massachusetts
- Coordinates: 42°15′27.4″N 71°7′13.4″W
- Area: less than one acre
- Built: 1910
- Architect: Kilham & Hopkins; Charles Connick Studio
- Architectural style: Late Gothic Revival
- NRHP reference No.: 99001308
- Added to NRHP: November 12, 1999

The First Congregational Church of Hyde Park, now the Hyde Park Seventh-day Adventist Church, is a historic Congregational church at 6 Webster Street in the Hyde Park neighborhood of Boston, Massachusetts. It was designed by the Boston architectural firm of Kilham & Hopkins, with stained glass by Charles Connick. It is a fine local example of Gothic Revival architecture, built for Hyde Park's second-oldest congregation (established 1860) in 1910.

The church was listed on the National Register of Historic Places in 1999.

It is now used by the Hyde Park Seventh-day Adventist Church. The SDA church purchased the property in 2007. On December 15, 2007, the day of the church's dedication, there were 304 members

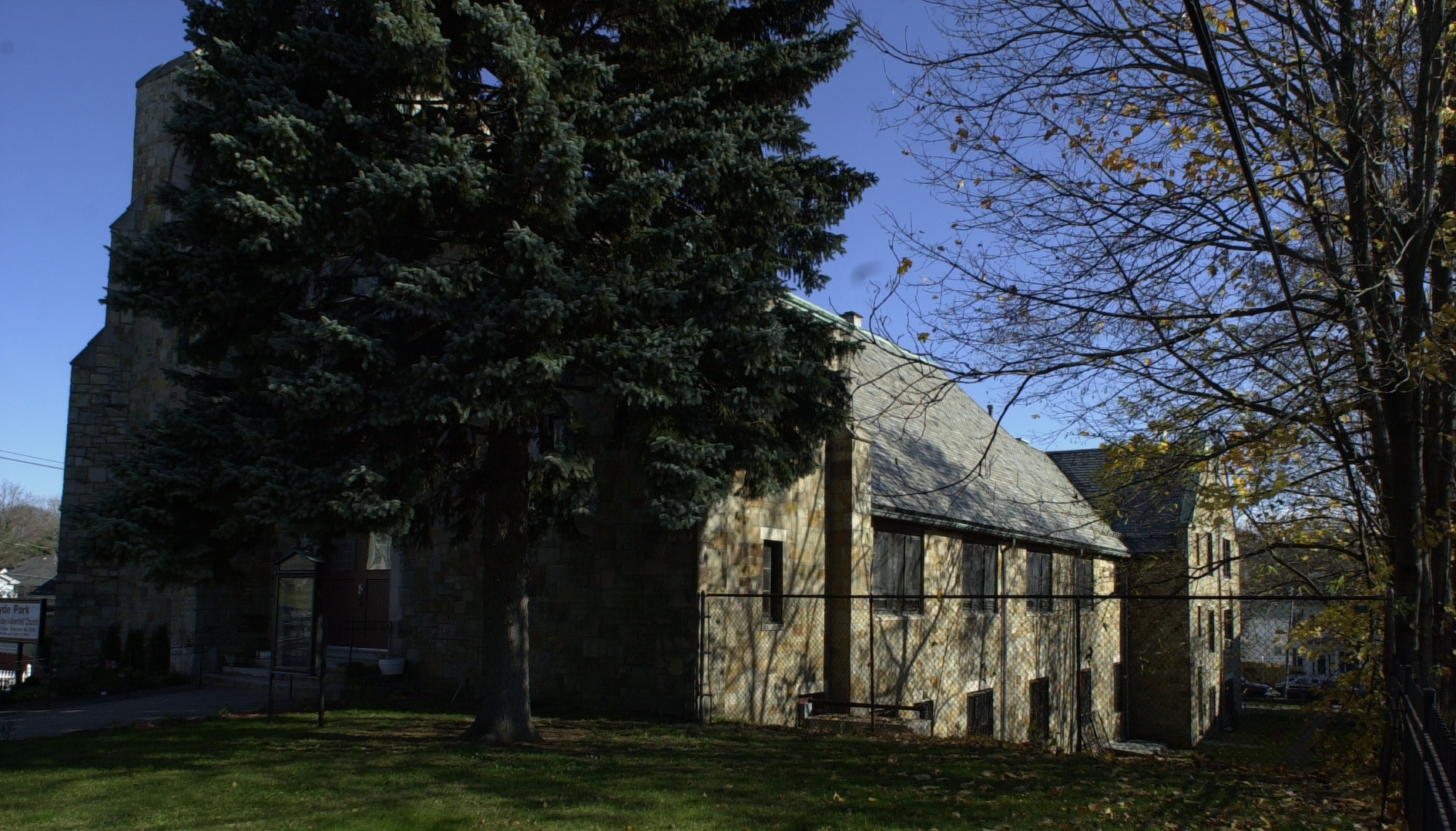

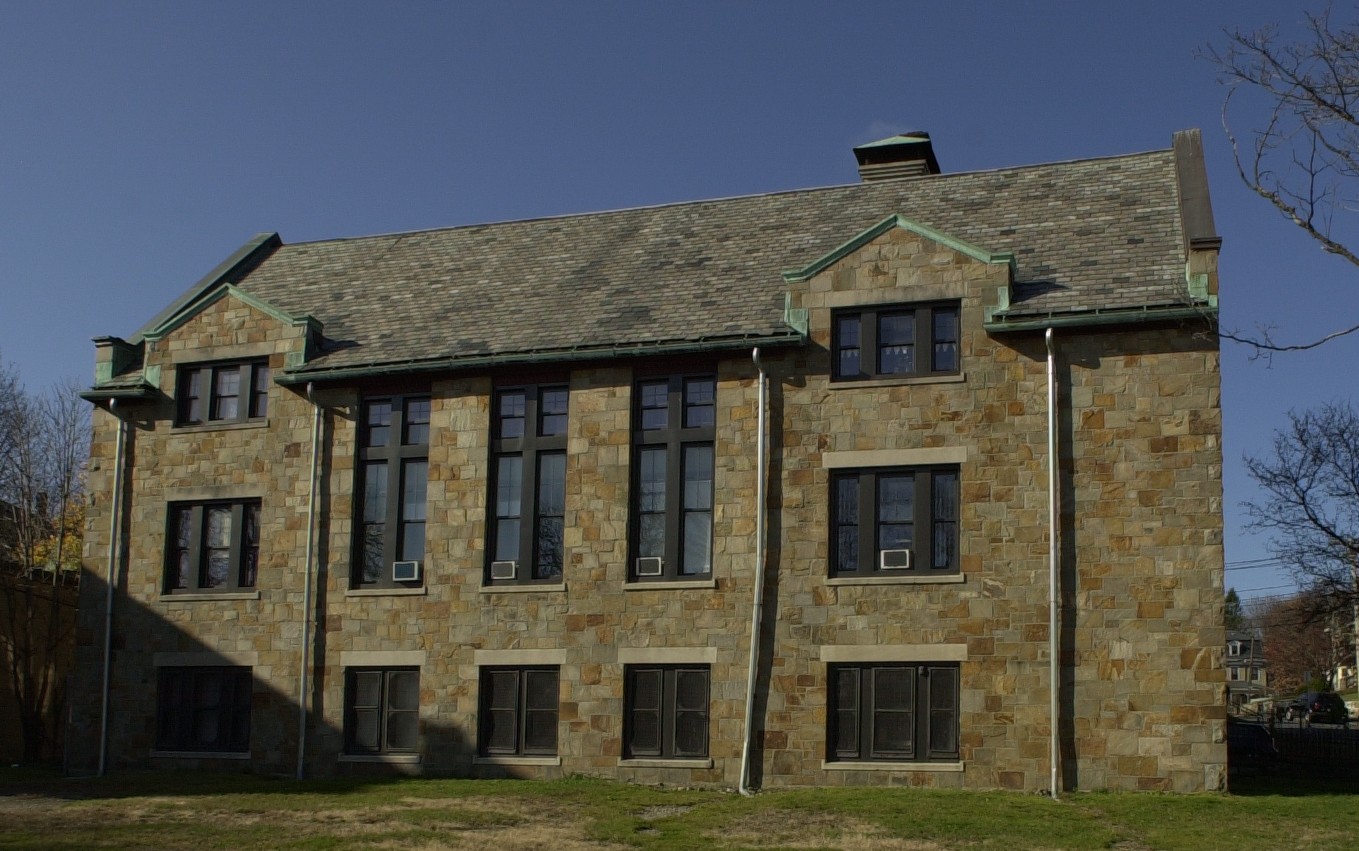

== See also ==
- National Register of Historic Places listings in southern Boston, Massachusetts
