= Blithewold Mansion, Gardens and Arboretum =

Historic house and gardens in Bristol, Rhode Island, United States

- U.S. National Register of Historic Places
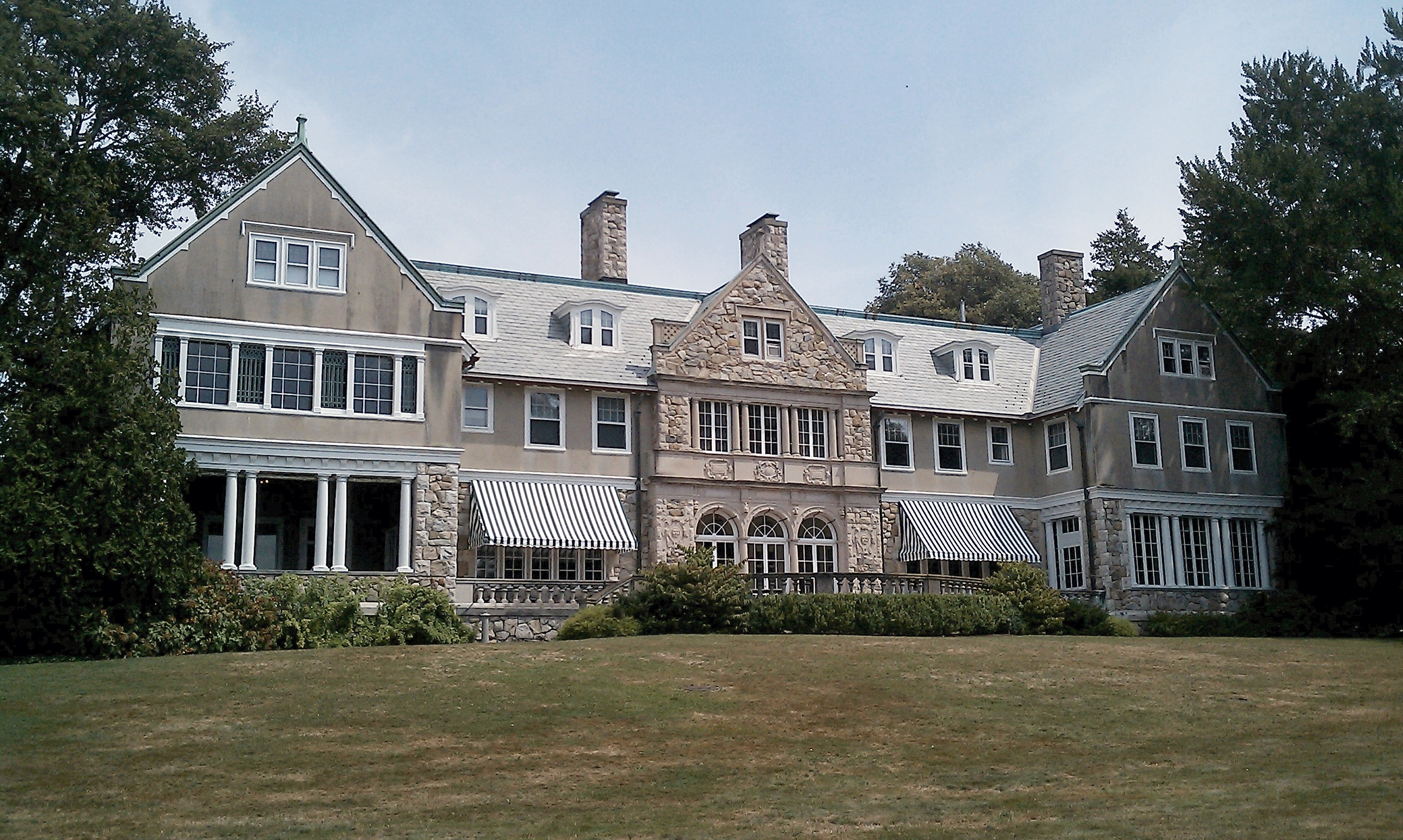
- Blithewold Manor (west elevation)

- Interactive map of
- Location: Bristol, Rhode Island
- Coordinates: 41°39′15″N 71°15′58″W
- Built: 1895
- Architect: Dewolf, John; Kilham & Hopkins
- Architectural style: Late 19th and 20th Century Revivals
- Website: www.blithewold.org
- NRHP reference No.: 80000074
- Added to NRHP: June 27, 1980

The Blithewold Mansion, Gardens and Arboretum is an arboretum of 13 hectares (32 acres), located at 101 Ferry Road, Bristol, Rhode Island, midway between Newport and Providence, Rhode Island, on Bristol Harbor with views over Narragansett Bay. It includes a mansion, with a 4 hectares (9.9 acres) lawn and over 300 species of woody plants in its arboretum and gardens, including both native and exotic species.

The Mansion and its grounds were established in the 1890s by Augustus and Bessie Van Wickle as their summer retreat. Augustus Van Wickle was from Hazleton, Pennsylvania, with a fortune in the coal-mining business and a donor of the Van Wickle Gates at Brown University.

== Mansion ==
The mansion was built in Queen Anne style in 1895, then rebuilt in 1906 as Blithewold II after being destroyed by fire. The slow-moving fire within the walls could not be extinguished, but much of the furnishings and other objects were able to be removed from the house. Blithewold II was designed in English Country Manor style by Walter Kilham of Kilham & Hopkins, Boston. In 1936 Marjorie Van Wickle Lyon inherited Blithewold, where she lived until her death in 1976 at the age of 93. By her bequest, ownership of Blithewold passed to the Heritage Foundation of Rhode Island (later known as the Heritage Trust of Rhode Island).

Since 1978 the house has been open as a public museum, restored to its appearance circa 1910, with an extensive collection of the Van Wickle's personal possessions, including furniture, decorative arts, letters and other writings, Marjorie's original watercolors, and an extensive collection and display of women's dresses and other costumes of the period.

== Grounds ==
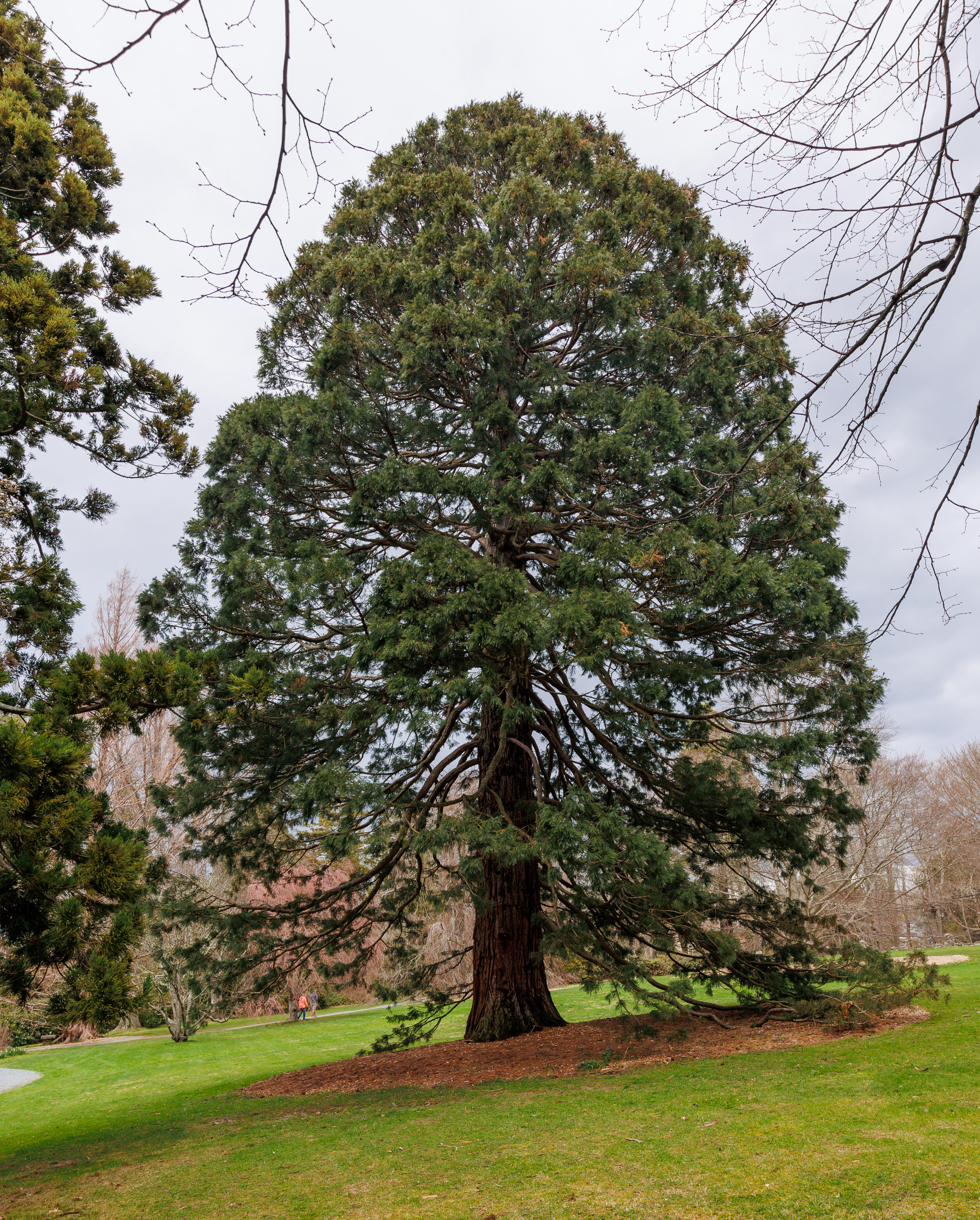
Giant Sequoia

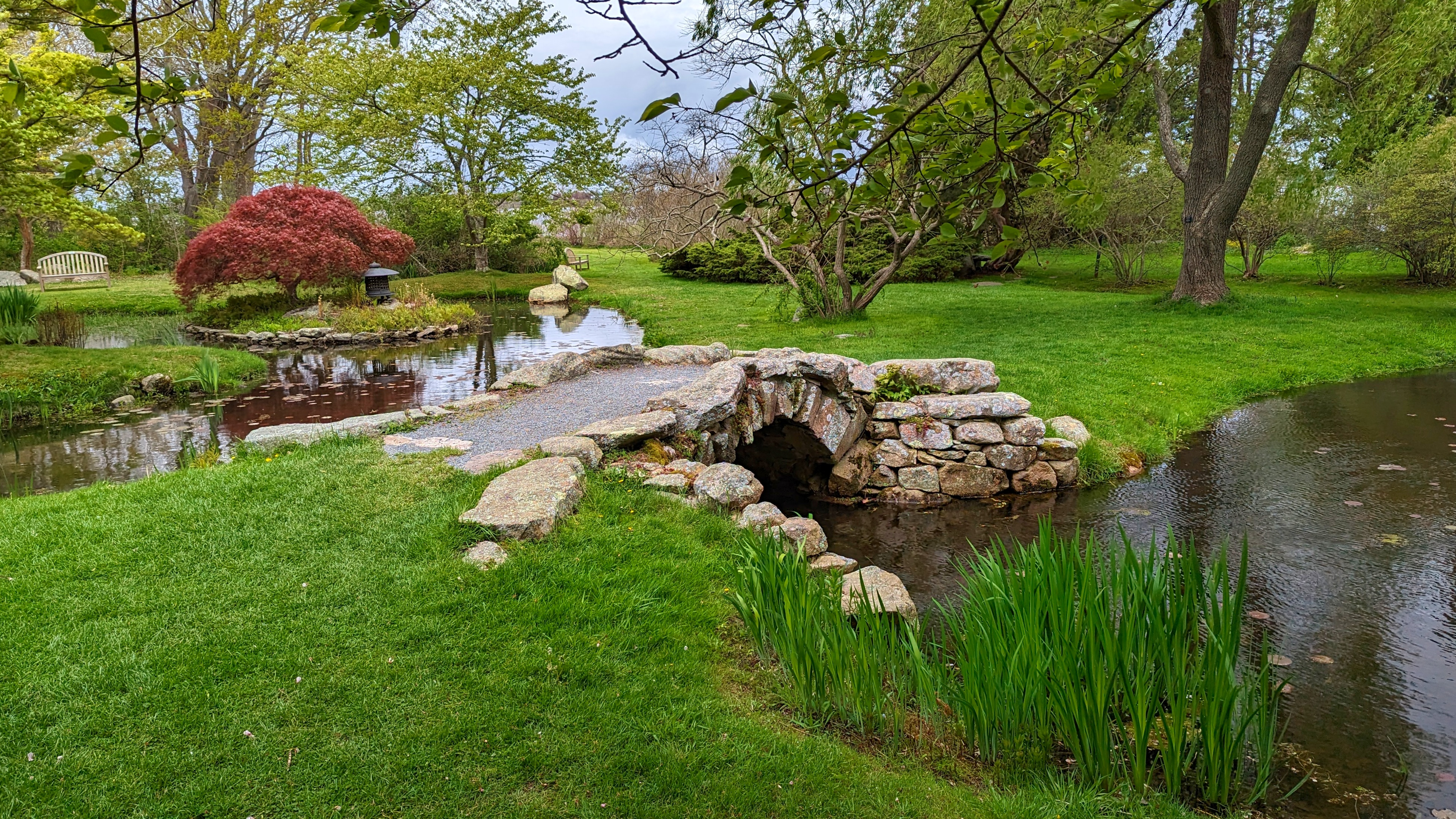
Water garden

Today's grounds are primarily the design of John DeWolf, and date between 1896 and 1913. The property was listed on the National Register of Historic Places in 1980.

Blithewold's grounds include species from North America, Europe, China and Japan. Specimen trees include magnolia (Magnolia spp.), linden (Tilia spp.), Ginkgo (Ginkgo biloba), black tupelo (Nyssa sylvatica), Dawn Redwood (Metasequoia glyptostroboides), Franklinia (Franklinia alatamaha), Eastern Hemlock (Tsuga canadensis), various oaks (Quercus spp.) and beeches (Fagus spp.). Other notable trees include a weeping Pagoda Tree (Styphnolobium japonicum 'Pendula'), Hiba (Thujopsis dolabrata), Katsura (Cercidiphyllum japonicum), and Sugi (Cryptomeria japonica). The grounds also include English Yews (Taxus baccata) and Eastern Junipers (Juniperus virginiana), as well as what is claimed to be the largest Giant Sequoia (Sequoiadendron giganteum) on the East Coast, and currently about 100 feet (30 m) tall. The Sequoia was planted ca. 1930.

Blithewold is home to at least two Rhode Island Champion Trees, including a Sargent’s Weeping Hemlock (Tsuga canadensis ‘Sargentii’, planted ca. 1920) and a Silver Fir (Abies alba, planted ca. 1911).

Blithewold's Bamboo Grove covers an area nearly the size of a tennis court, and is planted with Phyllostachys aureosulcata, the Yellow-groove bamboo, which grows to 10 metres (33 ft) tall.

Blithewold has maintained contacts with the Arnold Arboretum ever since 1926, when staff botanists visited Blithewold to see the Chinese toon tree (Toona sinensis) in flower for what was believed to be the first time in the United States.

== Gallery ==
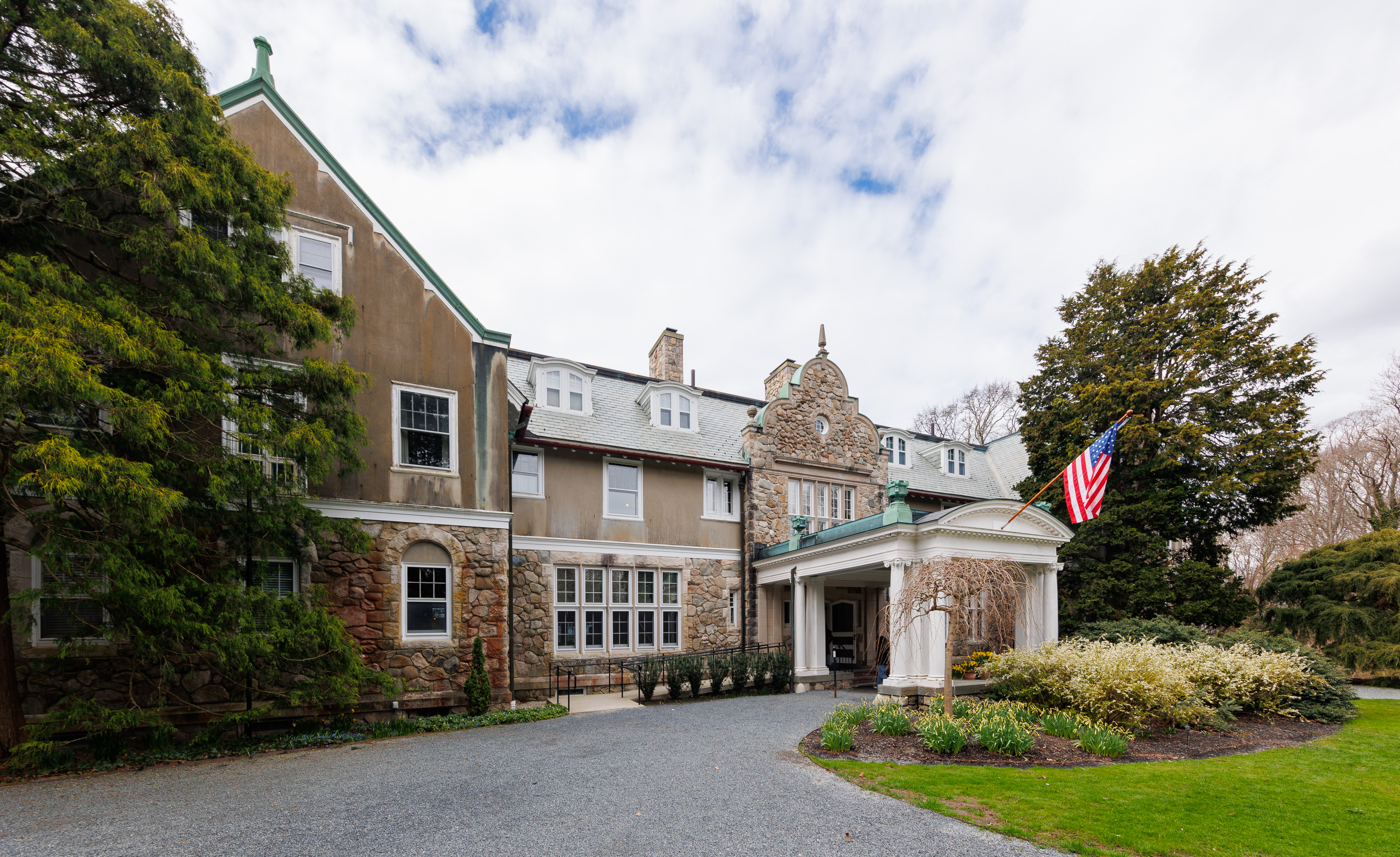
Front of the mansion.

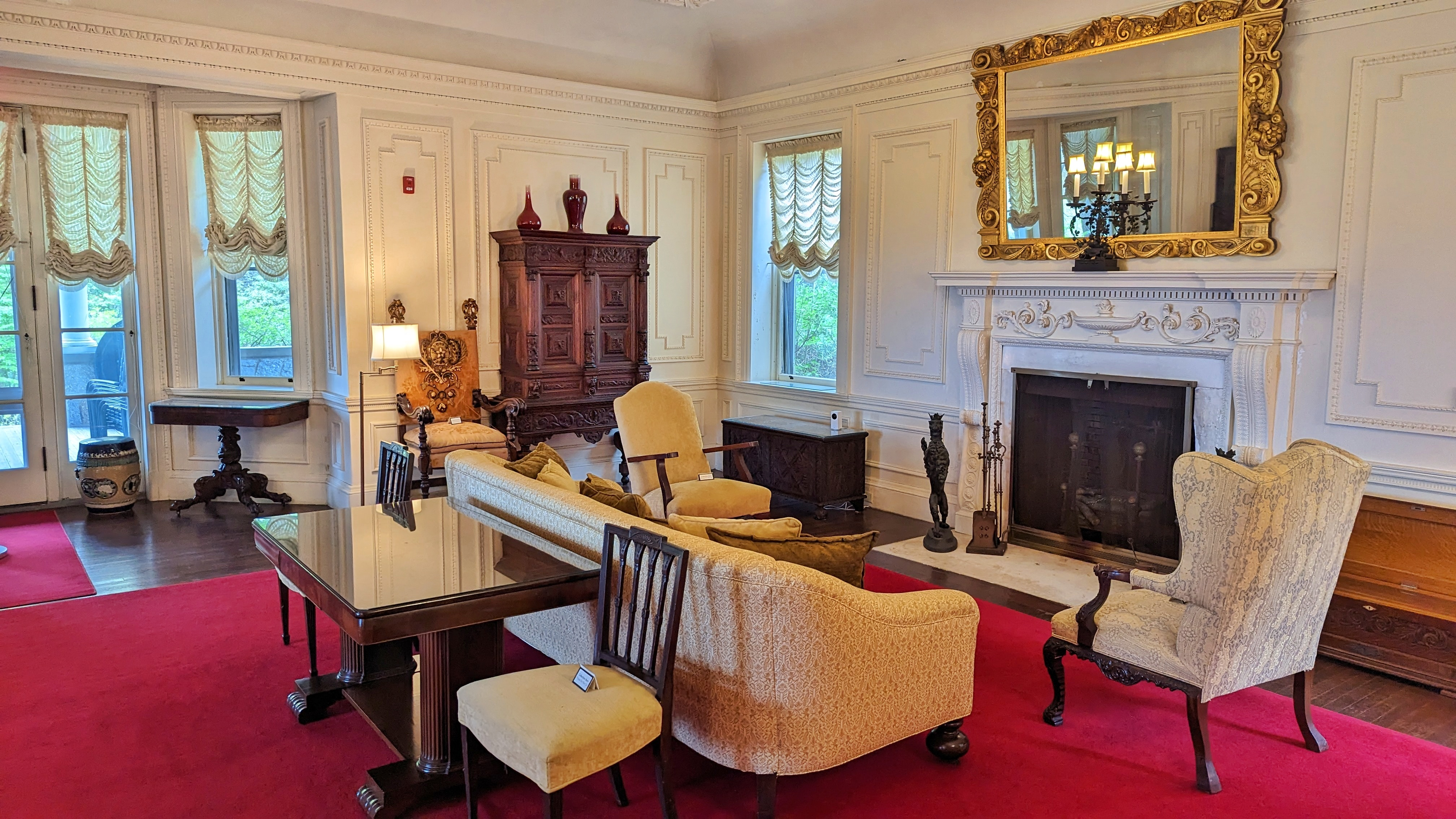
Fireplace and seating area.

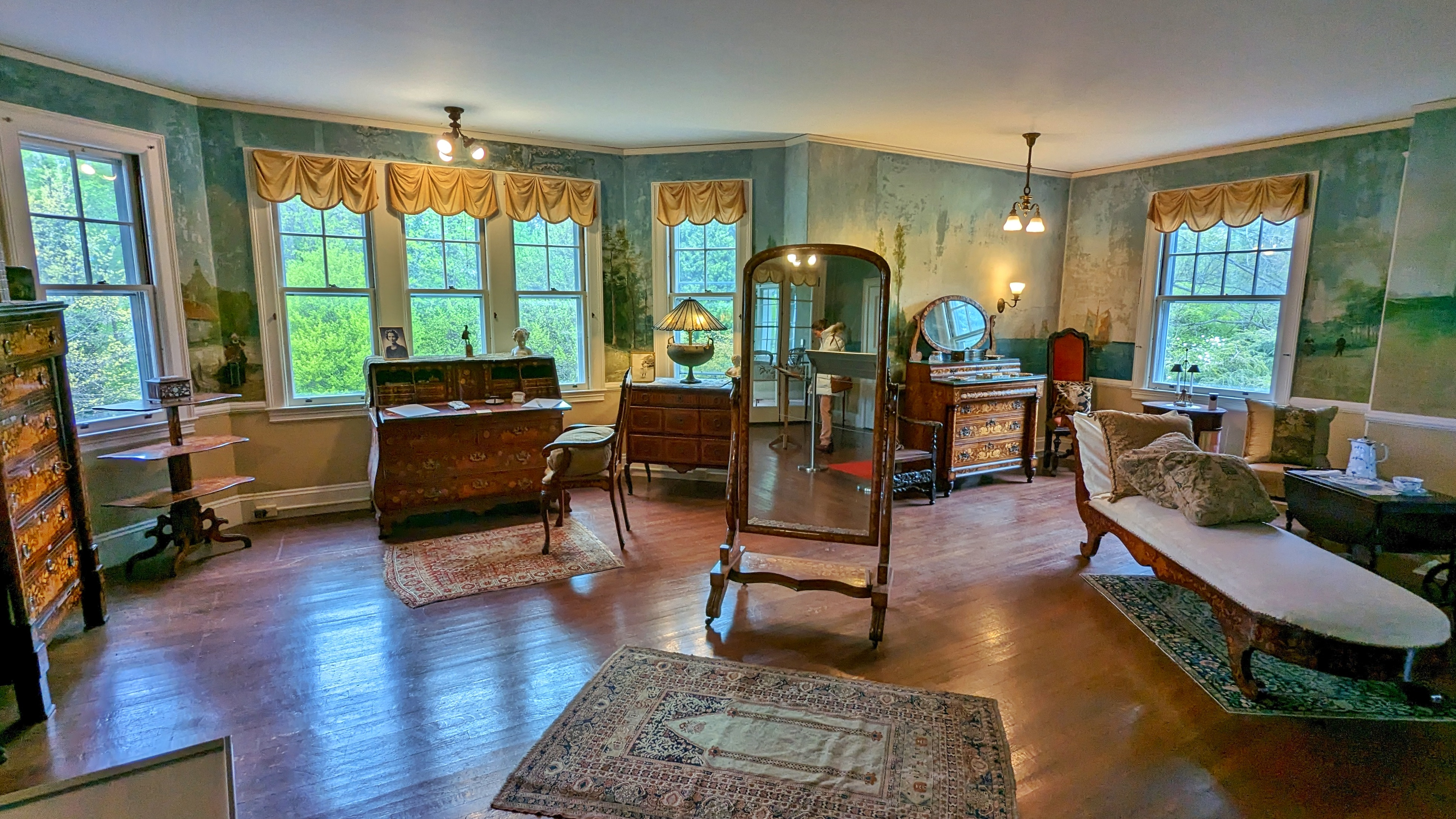
The Study.

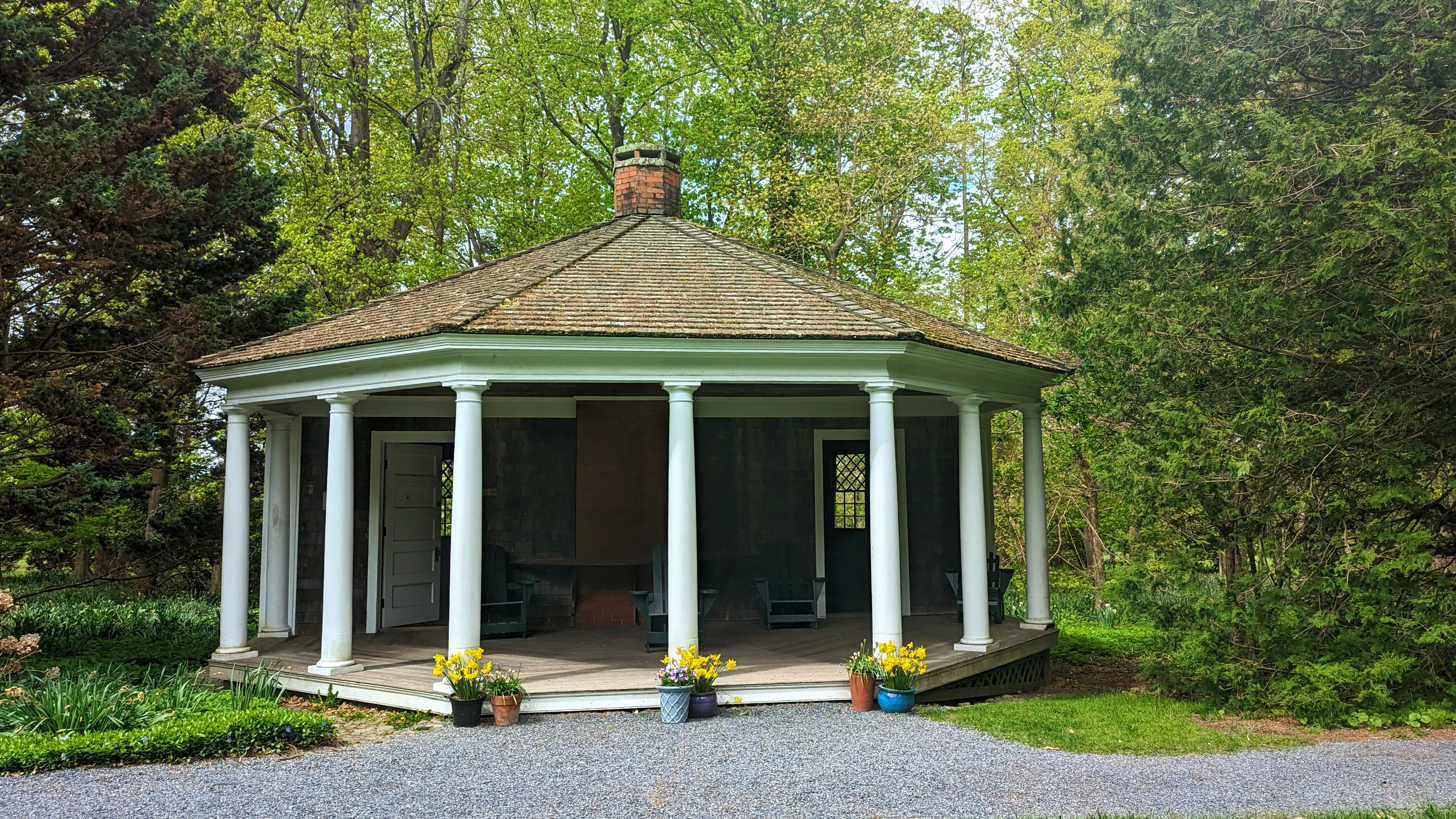
Summerhouse.

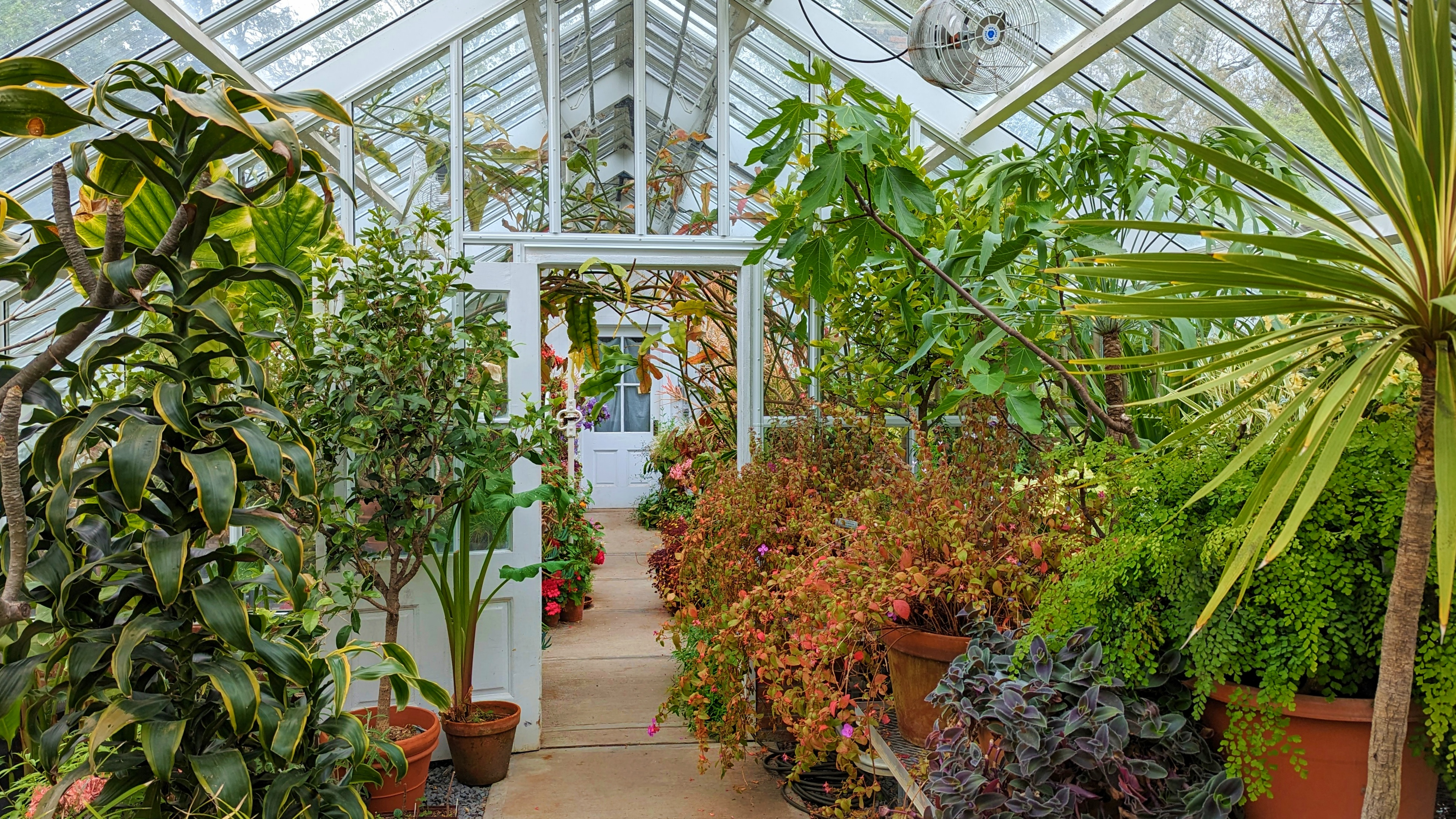
Greenhouse.

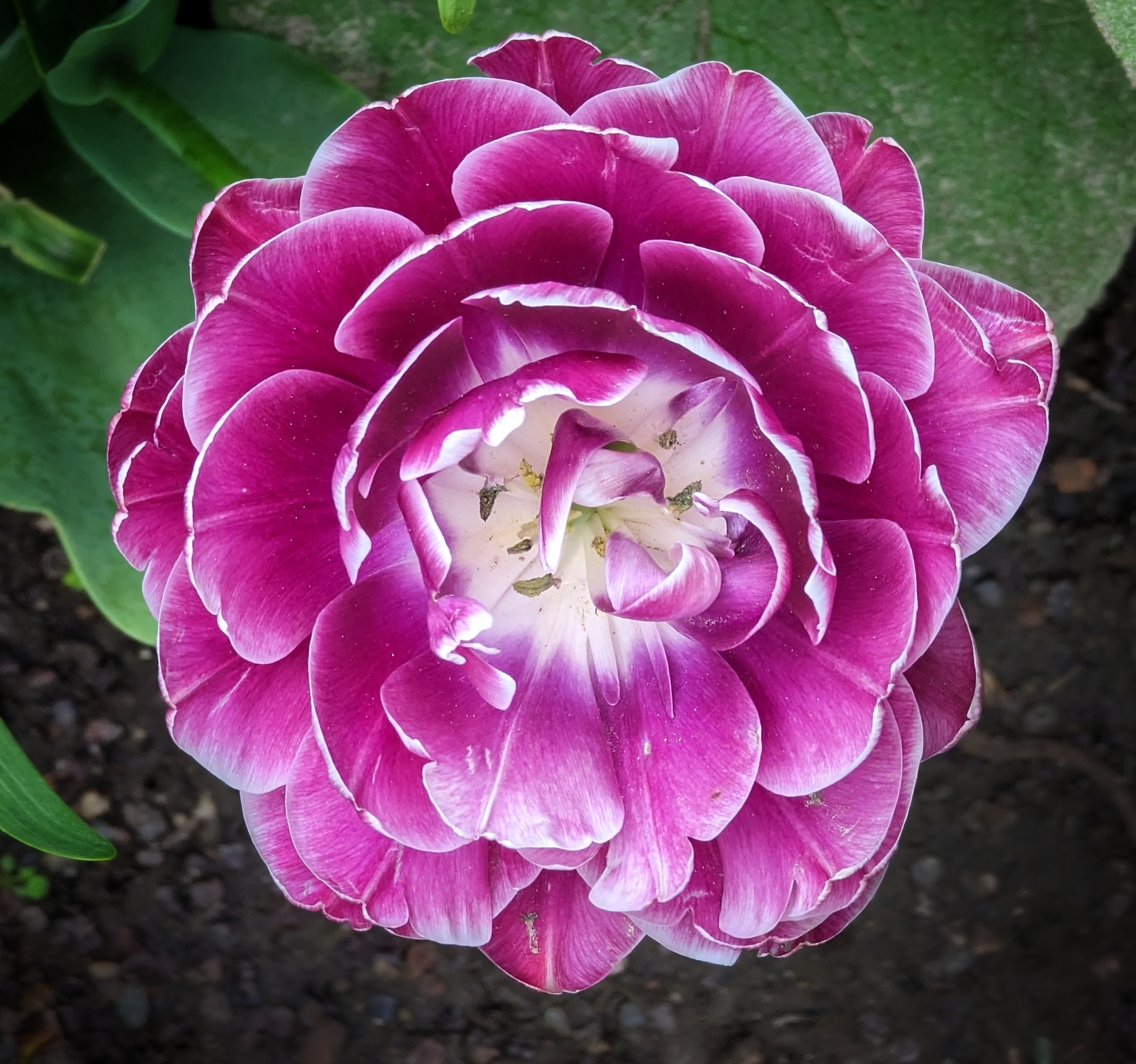
Tulip, one of the many species in the gardens.

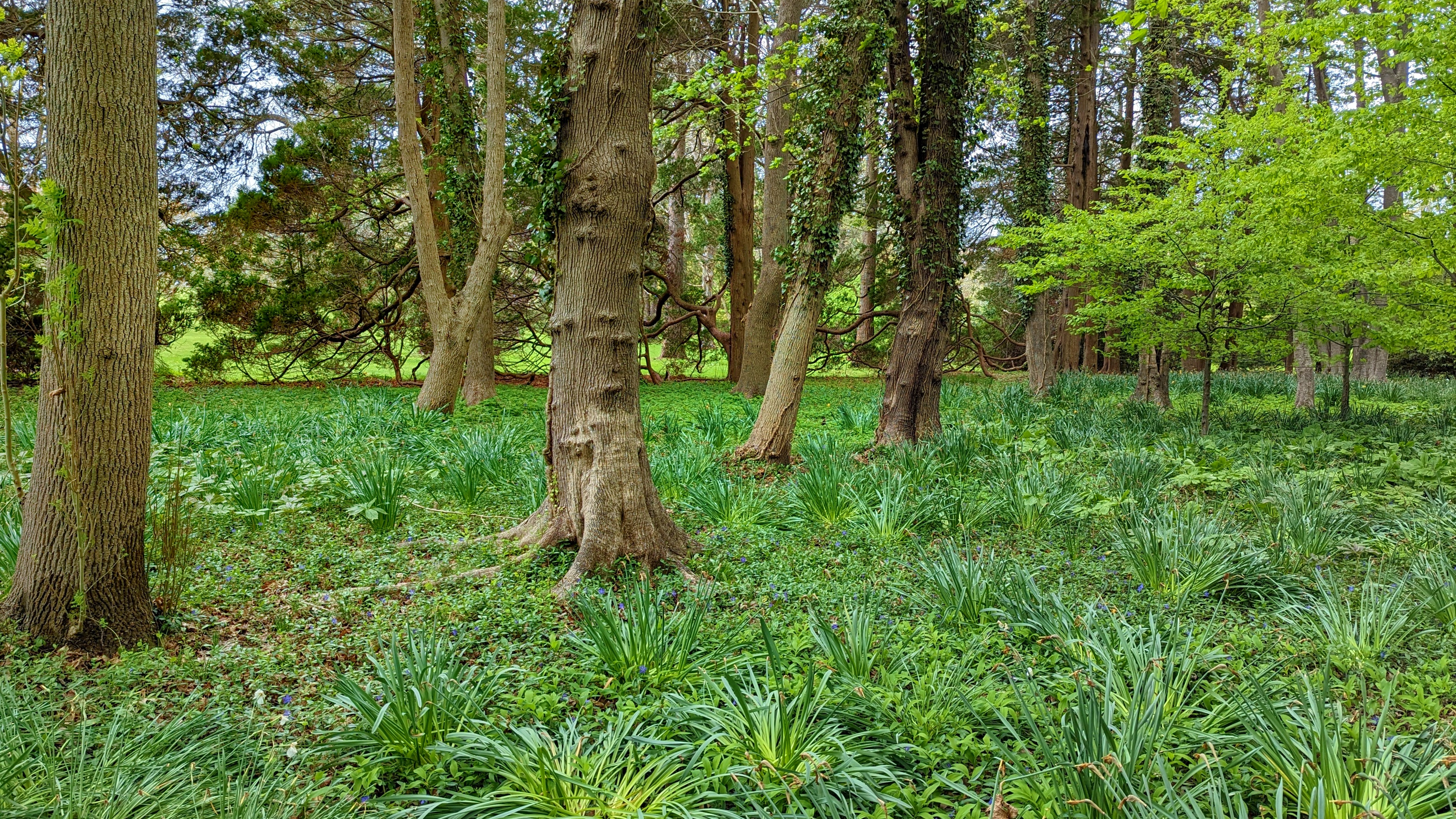
A variety of trees at the estate.

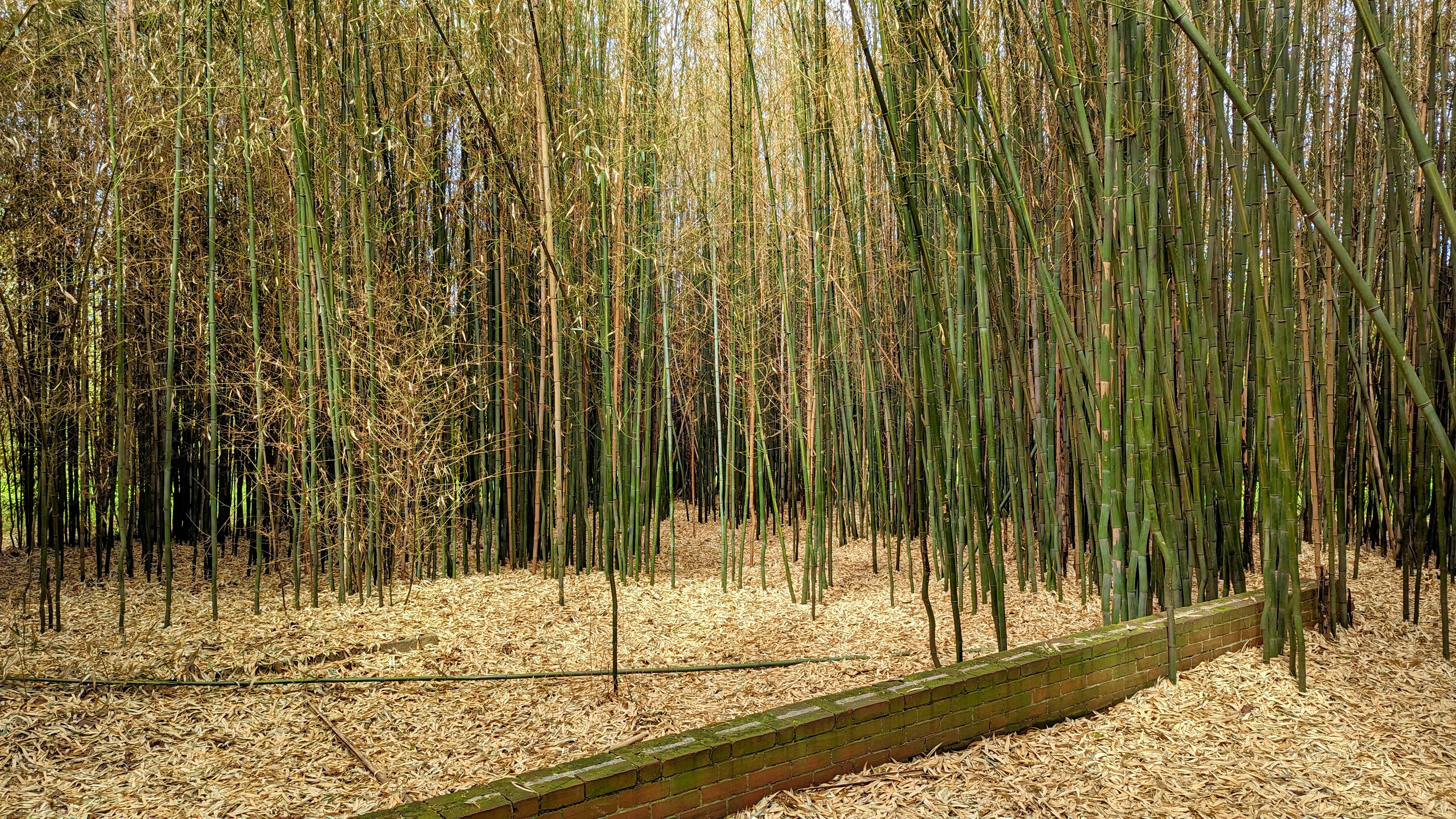
Bamboo section.

== See also ==
- List of botanical gardens and arboretums in Rhode Island
- National Register of Historic Places listings in Bristol County, Rhode Island
