= Students House =

- U.S. National Register of Historic Places
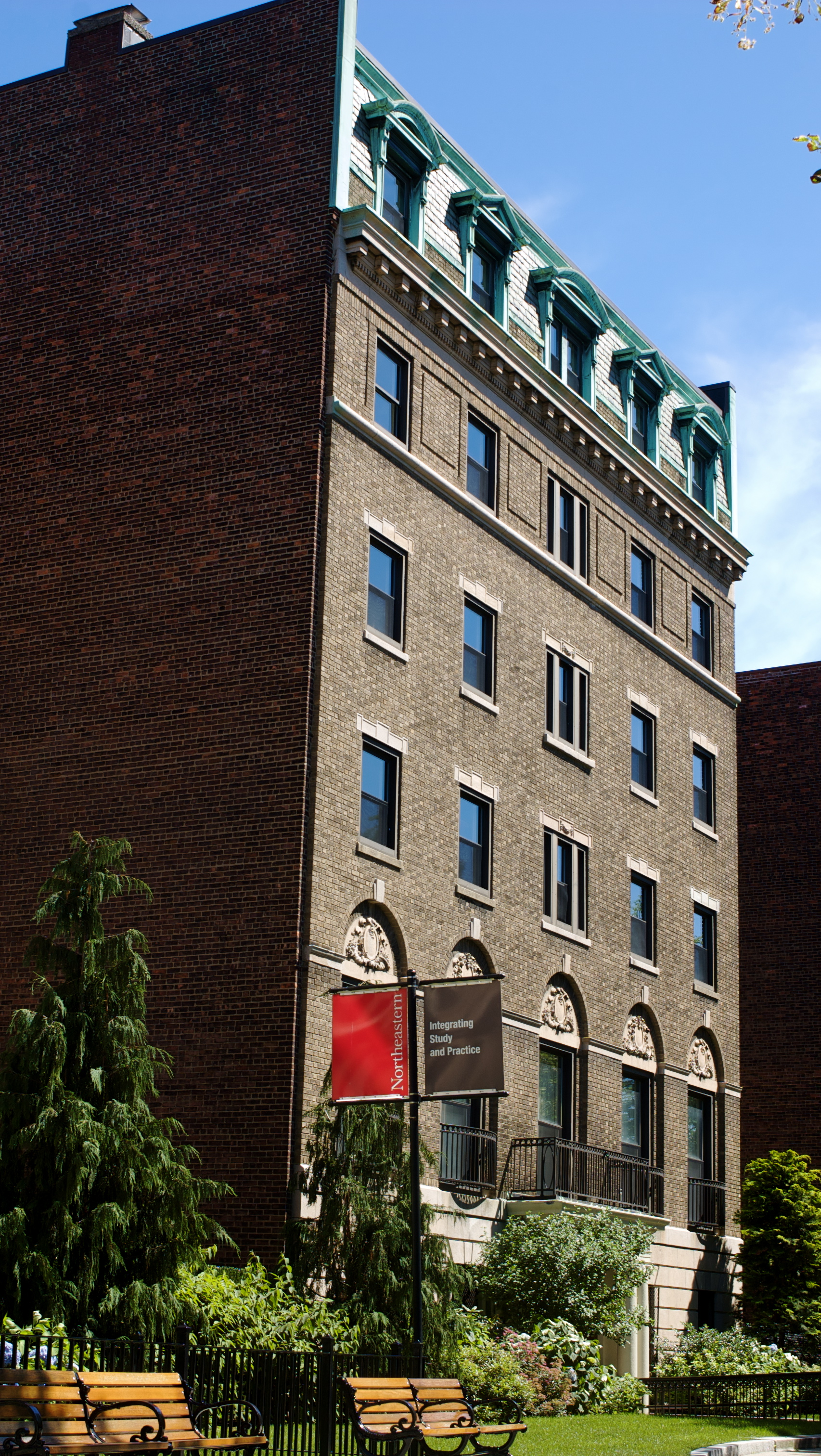
- Students House (now Kerr Hall at Northeastern University)

- Location within Massachusetts Location within the United States
- Location: Boston, Massachusetts
- Coordinates: 42°20′31″N 71°5′29″W
- Built: 1913
- Architect: Kilham, Walter H.; Hopkins, James C.
- Architectural style: Late 19th and 20th Century Revivals, Colonial Revival
- NRHP reference No.: 97000970
- Added to NRHP: September 11, 1997

The Students House is a historic dormitory on 96 Fenway in Boston, Massachusetts. The house was built in 1913 and designed by Boston firm Kilham and Hopkins. It was funded by an organization of local well-to-do Back Bay residents to provide affordable housing for female students attending area schools. Most of the students housed in its early years attended the New England Conservatory of Music, its population dominated by other schools after the conservatory opened its own dormitory. It was sold in 1972 to Northeastern University, which uses it to house freshman students, and is referred to as Kerr Hall.

The building was added to the National Register of Historic Places in 1997.

== See also ==
- National Register of Historic Places listings in southern Boston, Massachusetts
