= Kilham & Hopkins =

Architecture firm in Boston, Massachusetts

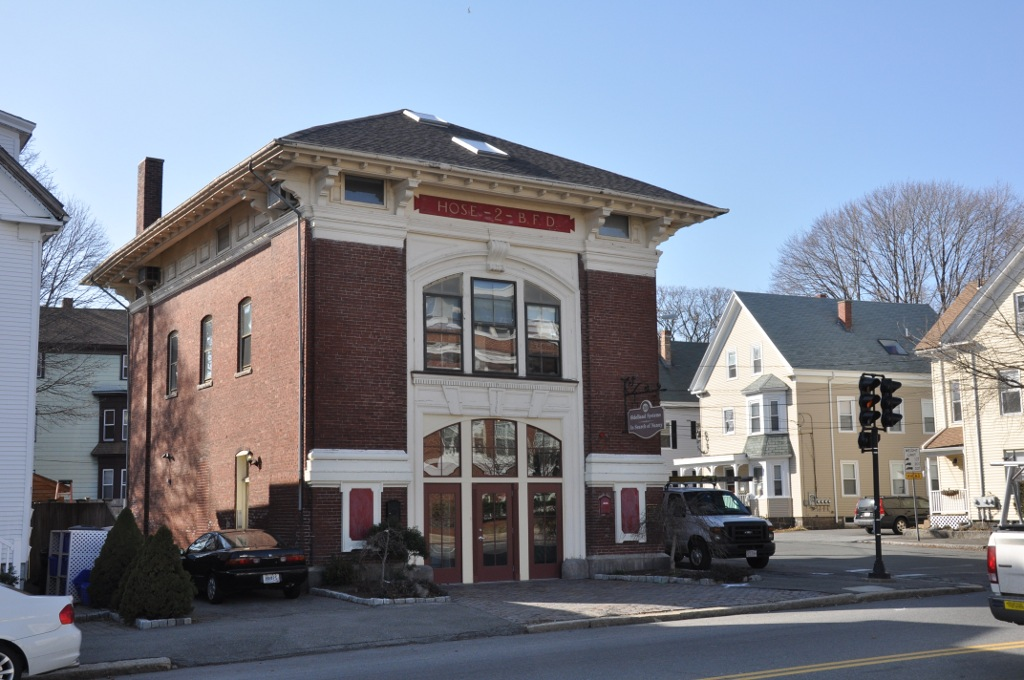
Hose House No. 2 (Beverly, Massachusetts)

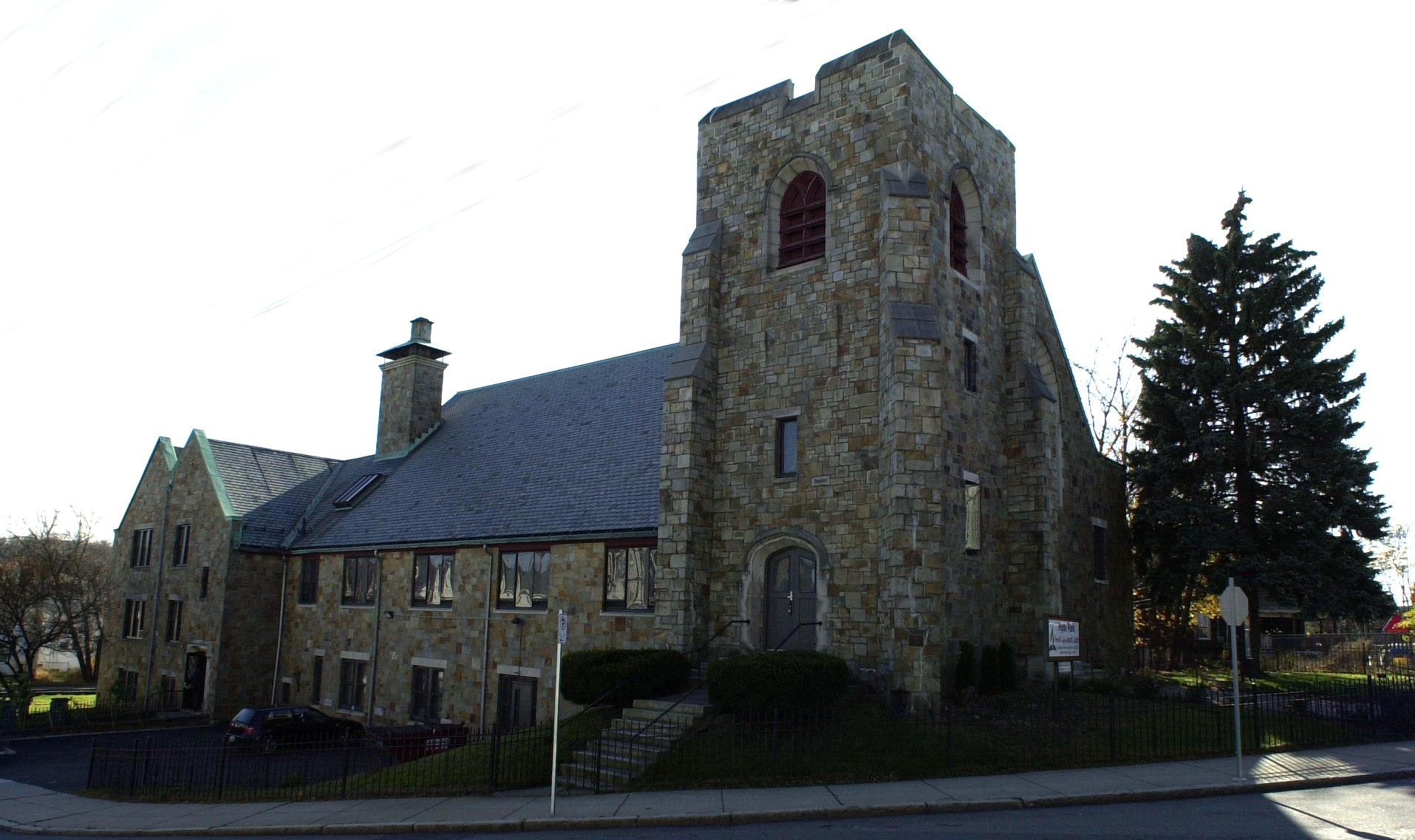
First Congregational Church of Hyde Park

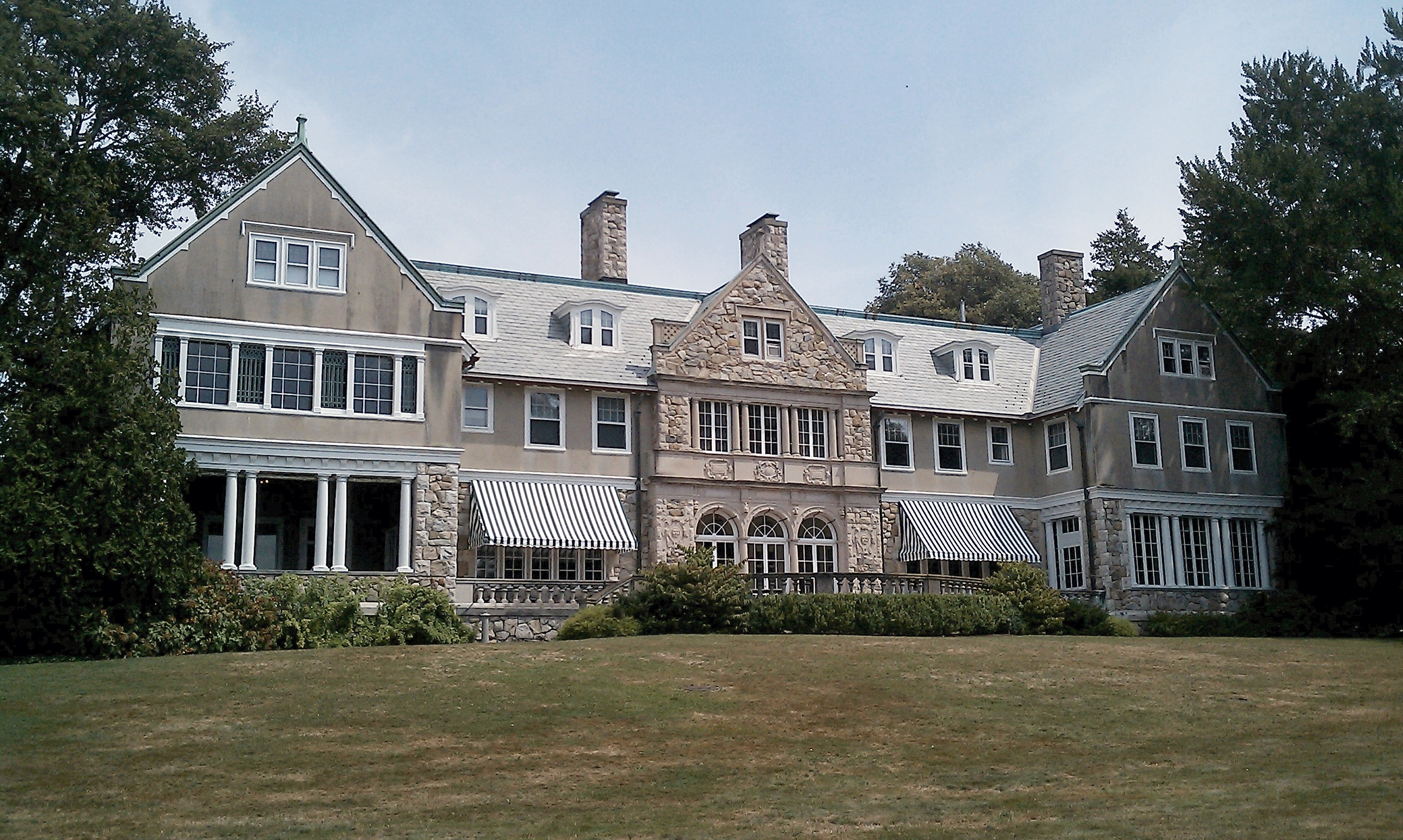
Blithewold Mansion

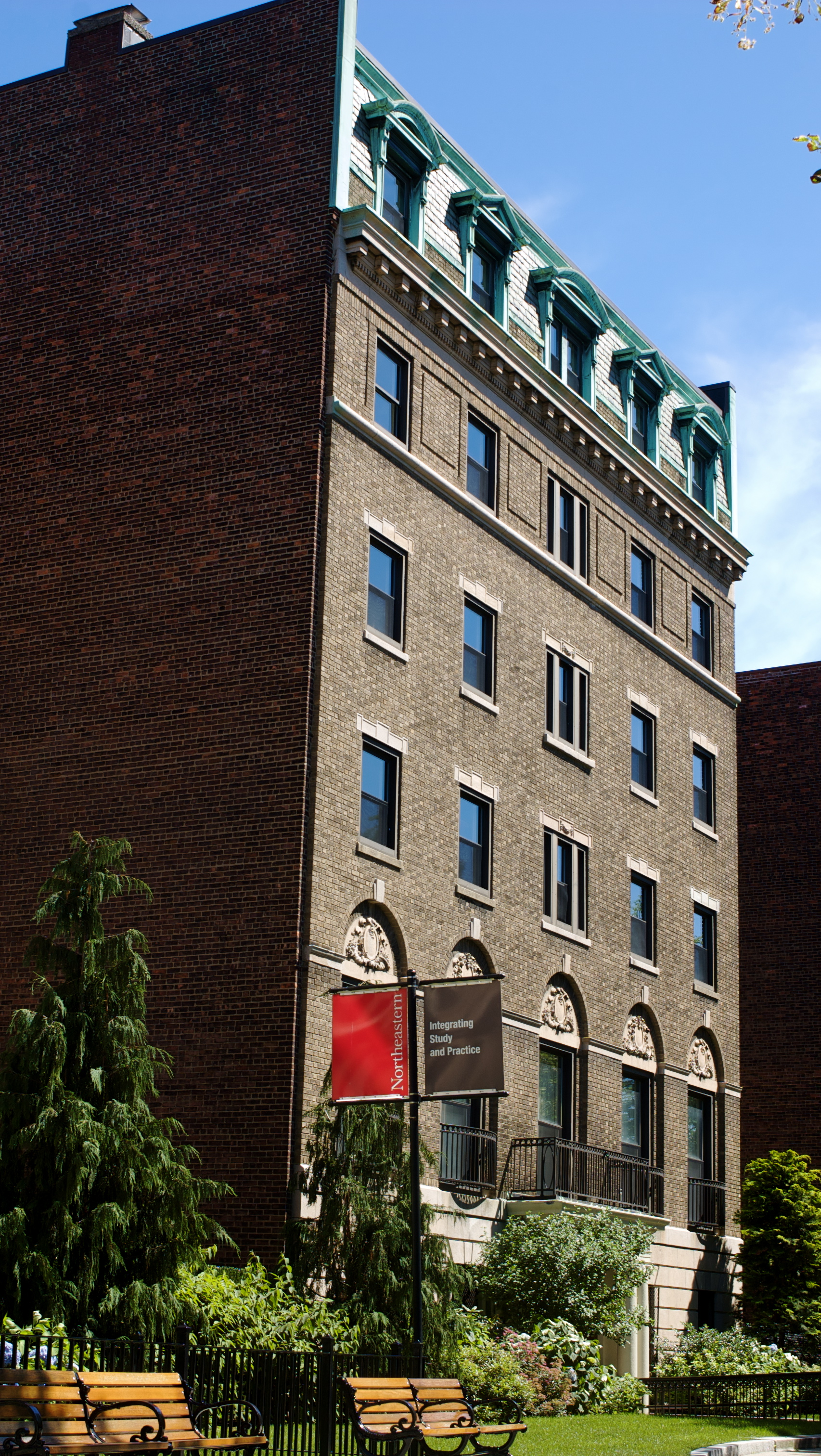
Students House on Fenway in Boston

Kilham & Hopkins was an architectural firm in Boston, Massachusetts formed in 1899 or 1900 by its founding members, Walter Harrington Kilham (August 30, 1868 – September 11, 1948) and James Cleveland Hopkins (December 25, 1873 – 1938). The firm later became Kilham, Hopkins & Greeley after William Roger Greeley (May 12, 1881 – October 1966) joined the firm in 1916, and Kilham Hopkins Greeley and Brodie after Walter S. (Steve) Brodie (October 26, 1911 – January 1985) joined the firm in 1945.

The firm has been recognized for its contributions to early 20th century reform housing, including its work at the Atlantic Heights Development in Portsmouth, New Hampshire, at the Woodbourne Historic District in the Forest Hills section of the Jamaica Plain neighborhood of Boston, and for the Naumkeag Steam Cotton Company in the Salem Point Neighborhood of Salem, Massachusetts. A number of the firm's works, including Blithewold and Hose House No. 2, have been listed on the National Register of Historic Places.

== History and membership ==
Kilham & Hopkins was formed in 1899 or 1900 by its founding members, Walter H. Kilham and James C. Hopkins. Both were graduates of Massachusetts Institute of Technology, Kilham receiving a B.S. in 1889 and Hopkins receiving his in 1895.

The works of the firm up to 1912 were documented in an illustrated retrospective, "The Work of Kilham & Hopkin: Architects of Boston, Massachusetts" published in Architectural Record. Kilham served as an instructor in architecture at the Massachusetts Institute of Technology for several years, and also developed a reputation for his work as a painter.

The firm became Kilham, Hopkins & Greeley after William Roger Greeley joined the firm in 1916. Greeley lived in Lexington, Massachusetts, wrote "The Essence of Architecture" in 1927, and served as moderator of the American Unitarian Association, the highest lay position in the Unitarian Church. The firm later became Kilham Hopkins Greeley and Brodie while Walter S. Brodie was a member of the firm from 1945 to 1970. One of the founder's sons, James C. Hopkins Jr. (c. 1914–1998), also became partner.

Firm founder Walter Kilham was an advocate for the end of tenement housing and for the construction of suitable housing for working men. By 1918, the firm "had achieved a reputation as advocates of housing reform and progressive town planning." The firm produced plans for World War I shipyard workers' Atlantic Heights Development in Portsmouth, New Hampshire, based upon their work in five projects already completed by the firm in Massachusetts. The firm's contributions to early 20th century reform housing were the subject of a 1987 work published by the University of Chicago Press.

In 1946, firm founder Walter Kilham published a book on the history of architecture in Boston.

A number of these architects' works are listed on the U.S. National Register of Historic Places.

== Selected works ==
Works with varying attribution, include but are not limited to:

=== Kilham & Hopkins ===
- Aldworth Manor, also known as Aldworth Farm (Harrisville, NH) Alterations to Home and new Carriage House. Built for Arthur Childs. Listed in NRHP and cited in the 1916 publication of Current Architecture (Boston Architectural Club)
- One or more works in Atlantic Heights Development, Concord, Crescent, Falkland, Kearsarge, Porpoise, Preble, Raleigh and Saratoga Ways, Portsmouth, New Hampshire (Kilham & Hopkins), NRHP-listed
- Blithewold, built for William McKee, Ferry Road, Bristol, Rhode Island (Kilham & Hopkins), NRHP-listed
- Dr. J. L. Bremer House, Cohasset, Massachusetts (Kilham & Hopkins)
- Briggs Residence, Brookline, Massachusetts (Kilham & Hopkins)
- 132 Carlton St. Brookline, MA (designed in 1908 in the French Beaux Arts-style)
- Michael Driscoll School, aka Westbourne Terrace School, 64 Westbourne Terrace, Brookline, Massachusetts (Kilham & Hopkins)
- Edward Devotion School (1913), 345 Harvard Street, Brookline, Massachusetts (Kilham & Hopkins)
- J. H. Duer House, Brookline, Massachusetts (Kilham & Hopkins)
- Lockey House (1912), 93 Seaver St., Brookline, Massachusetts (Kilham & Hopkins)
- President Finley's Bungalow, Tanworth, New Hampshire (Kilham & Hopkins)
- First Congregational Church of Hyde Park, built 1910, 6 Webster St., Hyde Park, Boston, Massachusetts (Kilham & Hopkins), NRHP-listed
- Estate of W. Scott Fitz, Manchester-by-the-Sea, Massachusetts (Kilham & Hopkins)
- Franklin School, 7 Stedman Road, Lexington, Massachusetts (Kilham, Hopkins & Greeley), NRHP-listed
- Haverhill High School (former), Haverhill, Massachusetts (Kilham & Hopkins)
- Hopewell School, Monroe St., Taunton, Massachusetts (Kilham & Hopkins), NRHP-listed
- James C. Hopkins Residence, Dover, Massachusetts (Kilham & Hopkins)
- Hose House No. 2, 30 Rantoul St., Beverly, Massachusetts (Kilham & Hopkins), NRHP-listed
- Massachusetts Institute of Technology, Summer School of Engineering (aka "Camp Technology"), Gardner Lake, near East Machias, Maine (Kilham & Hopkins)
- William L. McKee Residence, Boston, Massachusetts (Kilham & Hopkins)
- Charles F. Painter House, 78 Farlow Road, Newton, Massachusetts (Kilham & Hopkins)
- B. F. Pitman House, Brookline, Massachusetts (Kilham & Hopkins)
- Old Salem High School (1909), 29 Highland Avenue at Jackson Street, Salem, Massachusetts (Kilham & Hopkins)
- Salem Point Neighborhood, six wood-frame, multi-family dwellings built in 1915 for employees of the Naumkeag Steam Cotton Company, 1 Prince Street Place, 2 Prince Street Place, and Dow Street, Salem, Massachusetts
- Charles P. Searle House, Ipswich, Massachusetts (Kilham & Hopkins)
- The Shurtleff School (1909), Chelsea, Massachusetts (Kilham & Hopkins)
- Simplex Electrical Co. (two concrete factories), Sydney Street, Cambridge, Massachusetts (Kilham & Hopkins)
- R. A. Stewart House, Brookline, Massachusetts (Kilham & Hopkins)
- Students House, 96 The Fenway, Boston, Massachusetts (Kilham, Walter H.; Hopkins, James C.), NRHP-listed
- Tewksbury Town Hall (1920), Tewksbury, Massachusetts (Kilham, Hopkins & Greeley)
- Unitarian Universalist Church of Marblehead (1911), Marblehead, Massachusetts (Kilham & Hopkins)
- Vose Grammar School (built 1909, demolished 2007), Central Avenue & Brook Road, Milton, Massachusetts (Kilham & Hopkins)
- C. N. Wallace House, Boston, Massachusetts (Kilham & Hopkins)
- Williams School (1909), Chelsea, Massachusetts (Kilham & Hopkins)
- Woodbourne Historic District (1911–1912), aka Forest Hills Cottages, Kilham & Hopkins developed the overall housing project of Woodbourne and designed numerous cottages, Forest Hills section of Jamaica Plain, a neighborhood of Boston, Massachusetts (Kilham & Hopkins), NRHP-listed

=== Kilham, Hopkins & Greeley ===
- Modifications to Lexington Depot (1921–22), Lexington, Massachusetts
- Brookline High School (c.1930), 141 Goddard Avenue, Brookline, Massachusetts (Kilham, Hopkins & Greeley)
- Cary Memorial Hall (1927), aka Isaac Harris Cary Memorial Building, 1605 Massachusetts Avenue, Lexington, Massachusetts (Kilham, Hopkins & Greeley, with Willard D. Brown)
- Community Sailing Boat House (1940/1941), Boston, Massachusetts (Kilham, Hopkins & Greeley)
- Marshfield High School (1940), Marshfield, Massachusetts (Kilham, Hopkins & Greeley)
- Waltham City Hall, Waltham, Massachusetts (Kilham, Hopkins & Greeley)

=== Kilham, Hopkins, Greeley & Brodie ===
- Amesbury High School (1969), 5 Highland St., Amesbury, Massachusetts (Kilham, Hopkins, Greeley & Brodie)
- Braintree Public Library (1954), Braintree, Massachusetts (Kilham, Hopkins, Greeley & Brodie)
- Dedham Town Hall and Office Building (1962), Dedham, Massachusetts(Kilham, Hopkins, Greeley & Brodie)
- The Governor's Academy (formerly Governor Dummer Academy): Moseley Chapel (1964) and Thompson Arts Center (1965), Byfield, Massachusetts (Kilham, Hopkins, Greeley & Brodie)
- Hamilton-Wenham Regional High School (1963), South Hamilton, Massachusetts (Kilham, Hopkins, Greeley & Brodie)
- Happy Hollow Elementary School (1954), Wayland, Massachusetts (Kilham, Hopkins, Greeley & Brodie)
- North Middlesex Regional High School (1961), Townsend, Massachusetts (Kilham, Hopkins, Greeley & Brodie)

=== Other ===
- Glover School (built 1916, demolished 2012), Maple Street, Marblehead, Massachusetts (Walter S. Brodie)
- Hingham Memorial Tower (1907), Hingham, Massachusetts (William Roger Greeley)

== See also ==
- New Hampshire Historical Marker No. 286: The Atlantic Heights Neighborhood
