= Hopewell School (Taunton, Massachusetts) =

- U.S. National Register of Historic Places
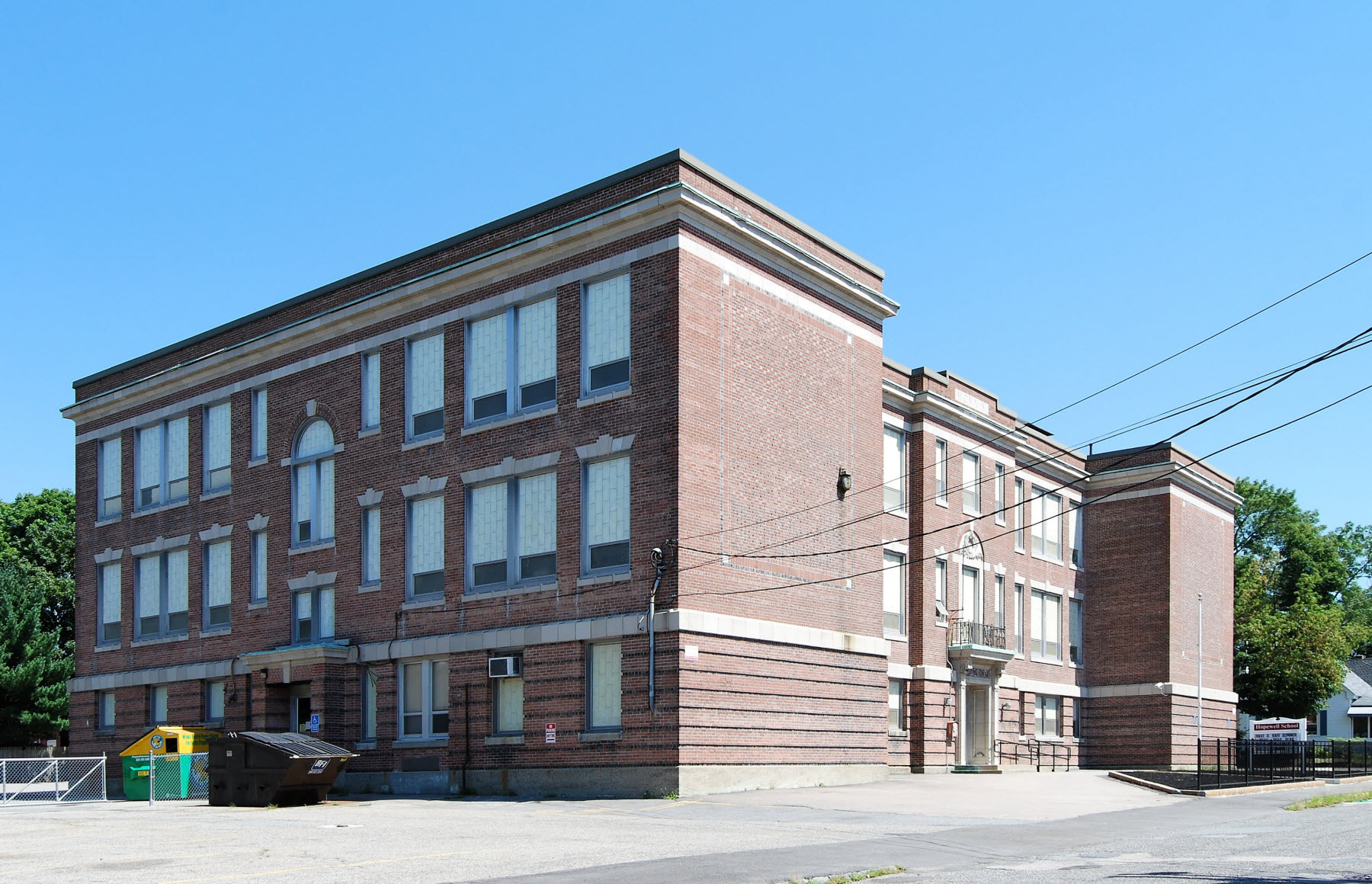

- Location within Massachusetts Location within the United States
- Location: Taunton, Massachusetts
- Coordinates: 41°55′11″N 71°5′40″W
- Built: 1914
- Architect: Kilham & Hopkins; Richardson & Hale (engineers)
- Architectural style: Renaissance revival
- MPS: Taunton MRA
- NRHP reference No.: 84003859
- Added to NRHP: July 5, 1984

The Hopewell School is a historic school building located on Monroe Street in Taunton, Massachusetts. It was built in 1914, and designed by the Boston firm of Kilham & Hopkins in the Renaissance Revival style. The school replaced a previous school of the same name located around the corner on Bay Street in the Whittenton section of the city.

The school is a three-story brick building, with terra cotta and stone trim elements. It has projecting end bays, with its entrance in a central section that projects only slightly. The entrance is trimmed in terra cotta, while windows have limestone trim, with those on the second floor sporting keystone lintels. The building is capped by a limestone cornice, above which stands a brick parapet. Some of its windows have been filled in with brick. The building was constructed utilizing the most up-to-date fireproof construction methods and materials known at the time, by the Boston engineering firm of Richardson & Hale. The bricks were locally sourced from Taunton brick yards.

The school was added to the National Register of Historic Places in 1984, for its architectural significance as a fine example of Renaissance Revival architecture, and for its role in the development of the city's public education systems, reflecting changing trends in educational architecture.

== See also ==
- National Register of Historic Places listings in Taunton, Massachusetts
