= Franklin School (Lexington, Massachusetts) =

- U.S. National Register of Historic Places
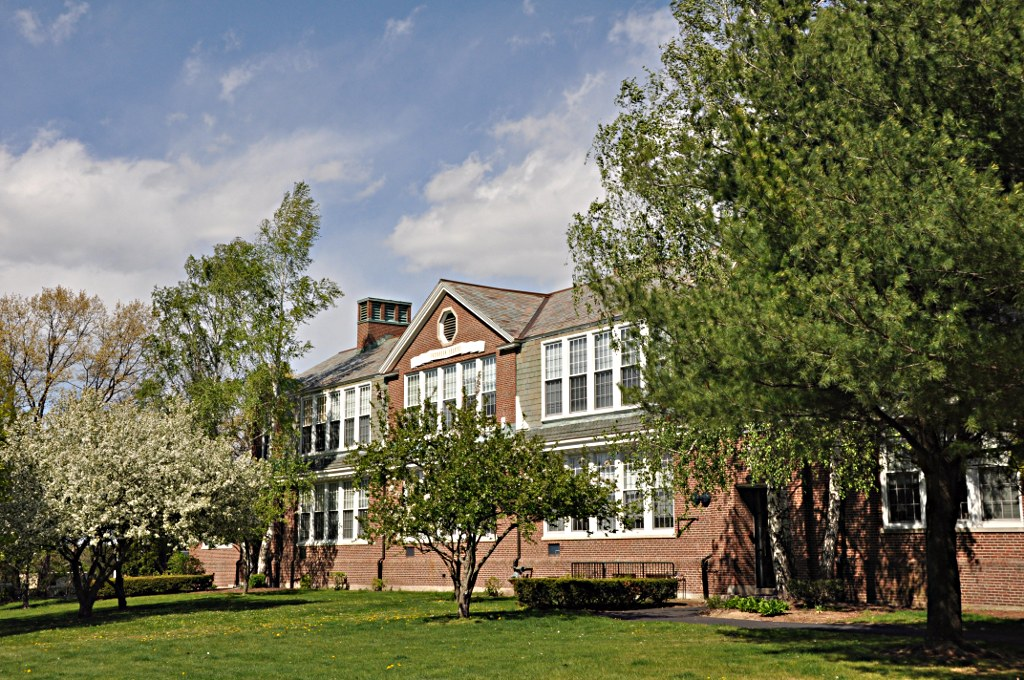

- Location within Massachusetts Location within the United States
- Location: 7 Stedman Rd., Lexington, Massachusetts
- Coordinates: 42°25′51″N 71°13′45″W
- Area: 3 acres (1.2 ha)
- Built: 1931
- Architect: Kilham, Hopkins & Greeley
- Architectural style: Colonial Revival
- NRHP reference No.: 09000437
- Added to NRHP: September 25, 2009

The Franklin School is a historic former school building at 7 Stedman Rd. in Lexington, Massachusetts. Built in 1931, it is the only school built by the town in the period of the Great Depression. The Georgian Revival structure was designed by architects Kilham, Hopkins & Greeley. It served as a public school until 1985, when it was converted to the Franklin School Apartments. It was listed on the National Register of Historic Places in 2009.

== Description and history ==
The former Franklin School is set on the east side of Stedman Road, a short road in a residential area of southern Lexington. The school stands at the front of a complex that includes five modern apartment buildings. It is a 2 1/2-story Georgian Revival structure, built out of load-bearing red brick, with a central section flanked on each side by matching 1 1/2-story wings. The roof of the main section is gambreled, with a center gable section that has an octagonal louvered opening at its center. Windows on both levels are groups of sash, organized 5–4–5, separated by the piers that support the gable. The projecting wing sections have groups of three windows facing to the front. The basic layout of the school's interior has been retained despite its conversion into apartments, which have been carefully fitted into classroom, office, and other spaces, retaining the brick-walled hallways. In the basement the utility areas of the building retain their original function.

The school was built in 1931, in response to growth in the town's population during the 1920s, and was one of the last major construction projects in the town until the 1960s. In 1958 additions were made to this school, but they were removed as part of its apartment conversion.

== See also ==
- National Register of Historic Places listings in Middlesex County, Massachusetts
