= M.H. Merriam and Company =

- U.S. National Register of Historic Places
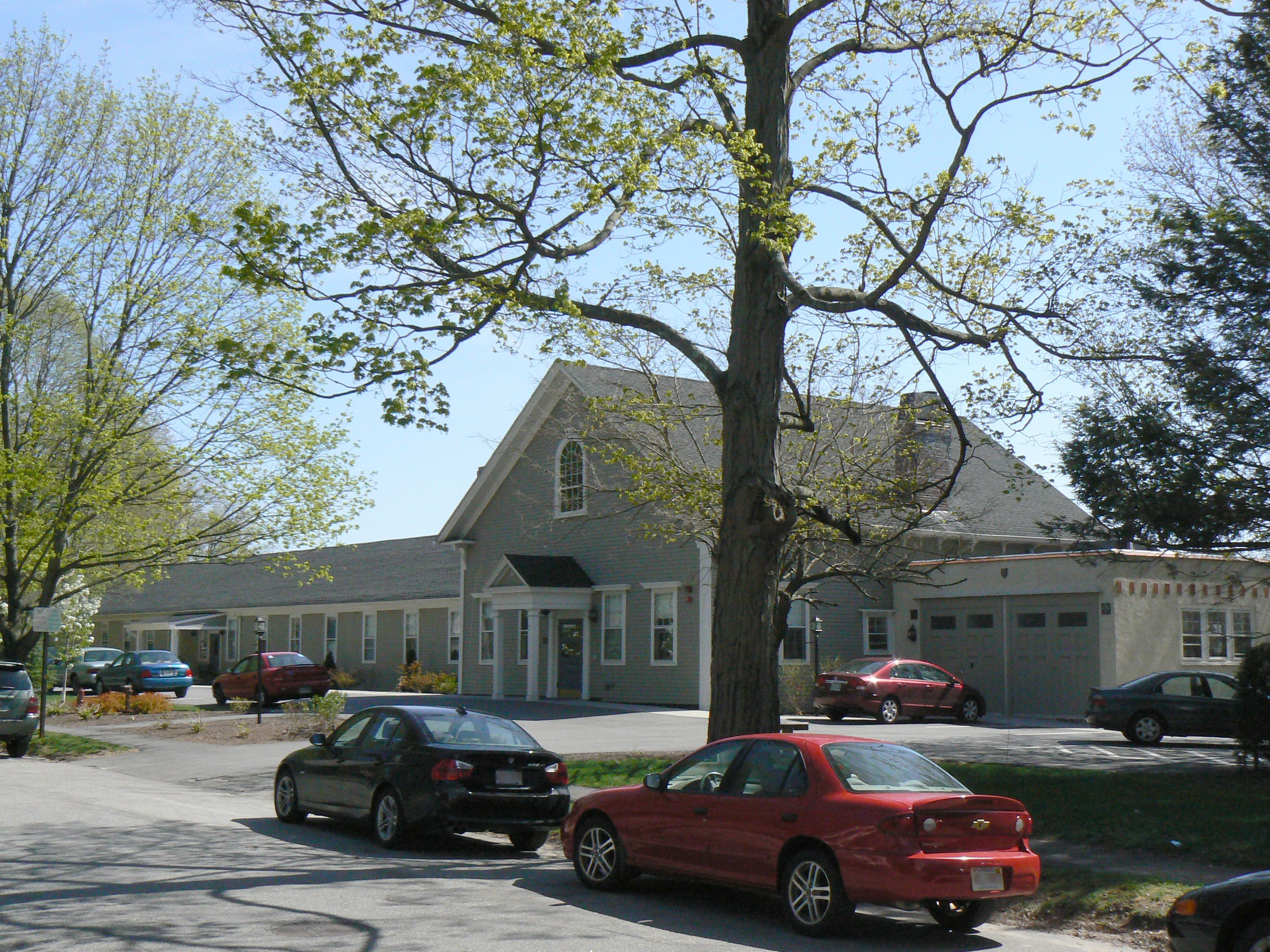

- Location within Massachusetts Location within the United States
- Location: Lexington, Massachusetts
- Coordinates: 42°26′56″N 71°13′37″W
- NRHP reference No.: 09000033
- Added to NRHP: February 18, 2009

The M.H. Merriam and Company is a historic factory building at 7-9 Oakland Street in Lexington, Massachusetts. The single story wood-frame factory building, built in 1882, is located just outside Lexington's central business district. It is unusual in part because Lexington was at the time a primarily rural town, and is important for its association with Matthew H. Merriam, a businessman, industrialist, banker, and civic leader, whose principal business was leatherwork associated with the manufacture of footwear.

The building was listed on the National Register of Historic Places in 2009, and has been converted for use as a long-term medical care facility.

== See also ==
- National Register of Historic Places listings in Middlesex County, Massachusetts
