= Warren E. Sherburne House =

Historic house in Massachusetts, United States

- U.S. National Register of Historic Places
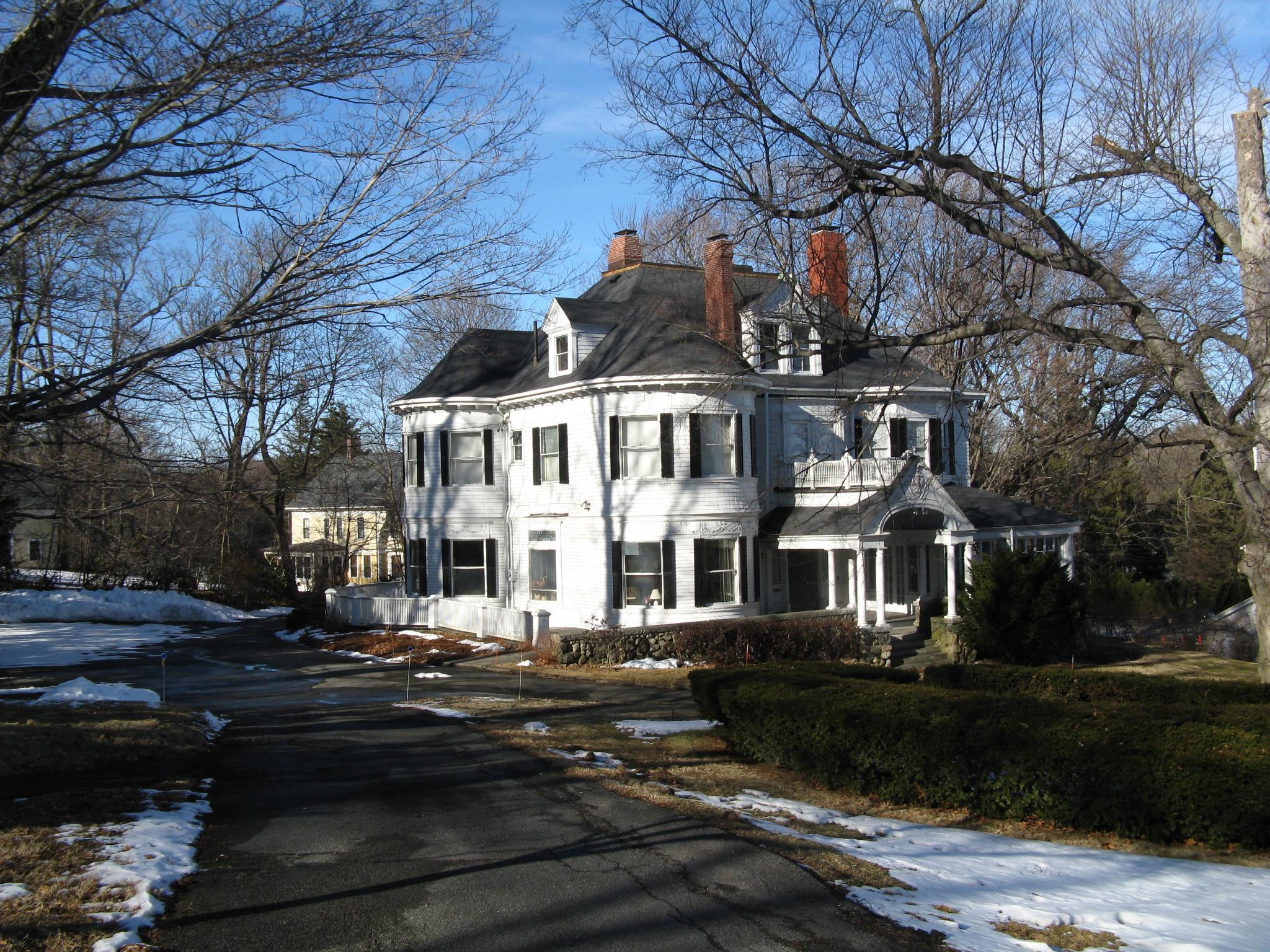
- Warren E. Sherburne House

- Location within Massachusetts Location within the United States
- Location: 11 Percy Rd., Lexington, Massachusetts
- Coordinates: 42°26′32″N 71°13′13″W
- Built: 1894
- Architect: Samuel D. Kelley
- NRHP reference No.: 77000178
- Added to NRHP: December 2, 1977

The Warren E. Sherburne House is an historic house in Lexington, Massachusetts. This architecturally eclectic house was designed by Boston architect Samuel D. Kelley and built in 1894. The house as irregular massing reminiscent of Queen Anne styling, as well as other features, such as its porch treatment, that are indicators of the Colonial Revival then coming into style. The owner, Warren Sherburne, was owner of a glassmaking company.

The house was listed on the National Register of Historic Places in 1977.

== See also ==
- National Register of Historic Places listings in Middlesex County, Massachusetts
