= Simonds Tavern =

- U.S. National Register of Historic Places
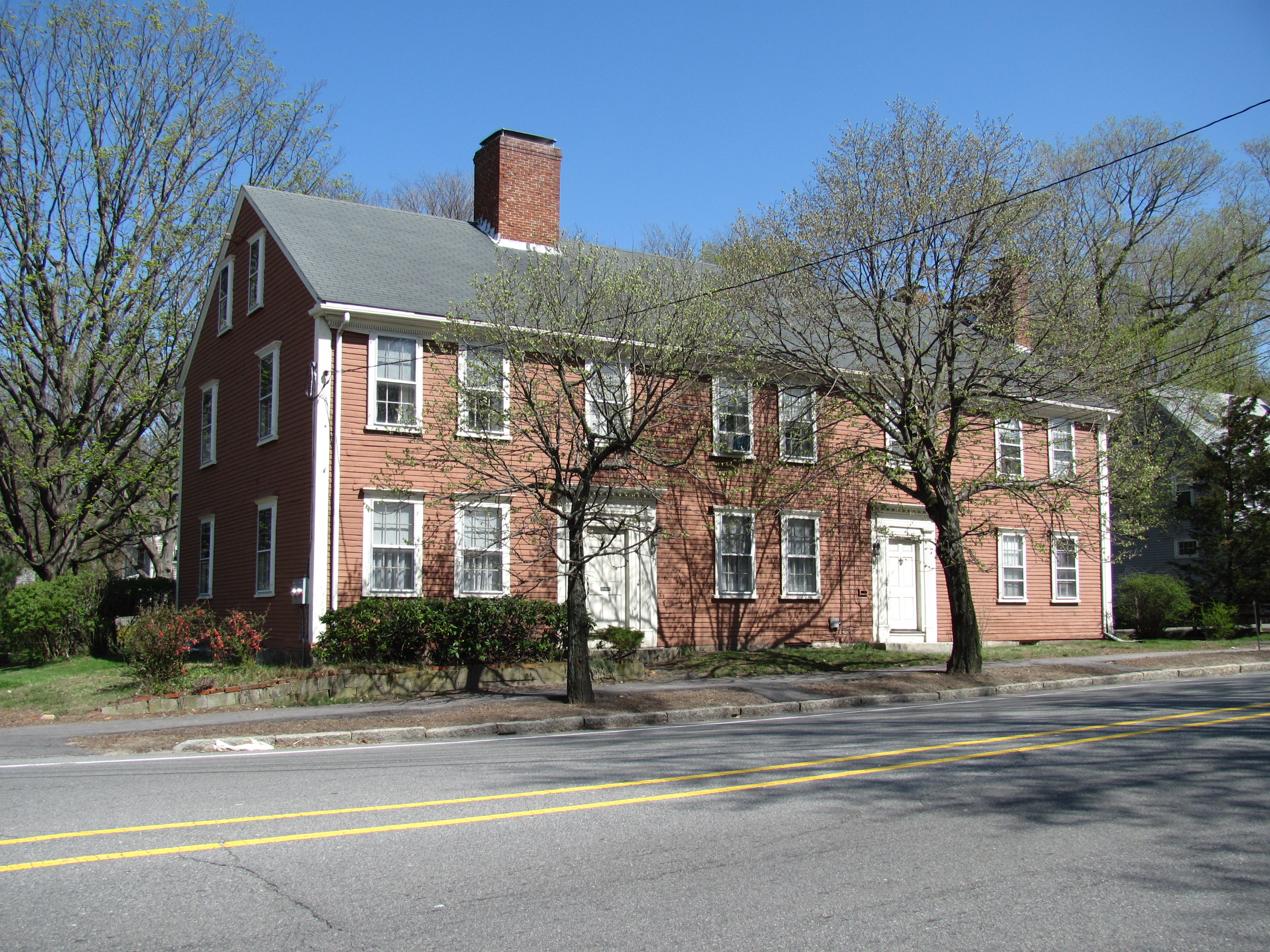
- Simonds Tavern

- Location within Massachusetts Location within the United States
- Location: 331 Bedford St., Lexington, Massachusetts
- Coordinates: 42°28′3″N 71°14′36″W
- Built: 1794
- Architectural style: Federal
- NRHP reference No.: 76000251
- Added to NRHP: October 14, 1976

Simonds Tavern is a historic tavern building in Lexington, Massachusetts. It is a 2 1/2-story wood-frame structure, eight bays wide, with two front entrances and asymmetrically placed chimneys. The first portion of the building was built c. 1794 by Joshua Simonds, who also ran a tavern near Fiske Hill. He began operating a tavern at this site in 1802, and enlarged the building 1810 after Bedford Street was cut through the area. The building's interior has well-preserved Federal details.

The building was listed on the National Register of Historic Places in 1976. It is now residences.

== See also ==
- National Register of Historic Places listings in Middlesex County, Massachusetts
