= Fort Hill, Boston =

- Fort Hill; Roxbury Highlands Historic District
- U.S. National Register of Historic Places
- U.S. Historic district
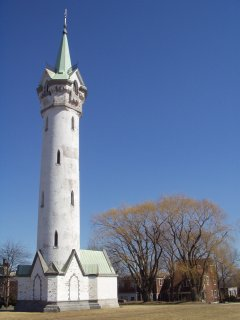
- Fort Hill's name originates from the American Revolutionary War fortification built in the center of the district, now the location of the Cochituate Standpipe.

- Location within Greater Boston area Location within Massachusetts Location within the United States
- Location: Boston, Massachusetts
- Coordinates: 42°19′31″N 71°5′40″W
- NRHP reference No.: 89000147
- Added to NRHP: February 22, 1989

Fort Hill is a 0.4 square mile neighborhood and historic district of Roxbury, in Boston, Massachusetts. The approximate boundaries of Fort Hill are Malcolm X Boulevard on the north, Washington Street on the southeast, and Columbus Avenue on the southwest.

The geographic area comprising Fort Hill was strategically important during the American Revolutionary War and housed the patriot army defenses during the siege of Boston. Fort Hill is actually named after an earthwork fortification that the patriot army built upon the hill located at the center of the neighborhood. The hill is now the location of Highland Park, which is notable for a Victorian-era tower designed by Nathaniel Jeremiah Bradlee, and landscaping designed by Frederick Law Olmsted.

Fort Hill developed rapidly as a residential neighborhood in the 19th century, especially after the extension of streetcar service from Boston. Fort Hill is served by the Massachusetts Bay Transportation Authority's Orange and Silver Lines. The neighborhood features a variety of architecture including Greek Revival and Italianate houses that predate the American Civil War, classic Boston triple-deckers, row houses and newer green developments. The neighborhood of Fort Hill, which is sometimes referred to as Highland Park, was listed on the National Register of Historic Places as the Roxbury Highlands Historic District on February 22, 1989.

== Points of interest ==
Fort Hill is home to the First Church in Roxbury, which, gathered in 1631, was the sixth church founded in New England. The Church has had five different meeting houses at its site at the intersection of Highland Avenue and Centre Street, with the current dwelling, built in 1803, still standing today as the oldest wooden frame church building in Boston. The First Church of Roxbury marked the starting point for the April 18, 1775 Midnight Ride by William Dawes who, along with Paul Revere, was dispatched by Joseph Warren to warn Lexington and Concord of the British incursion during the Revolutionary War. The First Church currently is the headquarters of the Unitarian Universalist Urban Ministry's activities.

The Dillaway-Thomas House located at 183 Roxbury Street was used by the patriots in the Revolutionary War. The Dillaway-Thomas House was built as a parsonage for the First Church in Roxbury, with construction beginning in 1750. During the eleven-month siege of Boston from April 1775 through March 1776, the 4700 soldier right wing of the patriot army camped in Roxbury. Major General John Thomas used the house as his headquarters. The Dillaway-Thomas House now houses the operations for Roxbury Heritage State Park.

During the American Revolutionary War, the Roxbury High Fort played a significant strategic role in the siege of Boston. The fort, located on what is now Beech Glen Street, gave Fort Hill its name.

== History ==
=== Colonial era to the early 19th century ===
The area comprising Fort Hill contained mostly country estates and farm and pasture land in the era preceding the American Revolutionary War. Despite its agrarian orientation, the area was strategically important to the colonial resistance to the siege of Boston. The only road that connected the mainland with Boston on the Shawmut Peninsula passed through Fort Hill, dividing at John Eliot Square into the road to Brookline and Cambridge (Roxbury and Tremont Streets) and the road to Dedham (Centre Street). The district's height overlooking the land connection and its puddingstone outcroppings made it an advantageous location for the Continental Army to build fortifications.

In the summer of 1775, the Continental Army built two forts in the area as part of a circle of defenses that eventually enabled the evacuation of the British from Boston. The Lower Fort was located on two acres of land between Cedar, Highland and Linwood Streets. The High Fort was an earthworks structure that occupied the summit of the hill. The Revolutionary War resulted in the destruction of many of Fort Hill's colonial-era buildings, and the Dillaway-Thomas is the only surviving pre-Revolutionary structure in the district.

Fort Hill began its transformation from agricultural to residential uses in the early nineteenth century. In 1803, what is now known as Washington Street was improved to become the Norfolk and Bristol Turnpike, a road that connected Boston with Pawtucket, Rhode Island. As early as the 1820s, a horse-drawn bus line was established along Washington Street to carry commuters into Boston, and in 1835 the railroad from Boston to Providence was sited along the Stony Brook Valley on the North side of Fort Hill. These improvements in transportation drew wealthy estate builders and upper middle class businessmen to Fort Hill.

=== Annexation and streetcar suburb ===
Roxbury's annexation to Boston in 1868 triggered the first wave of heavy suburbanization within the district. In 1869, Roxbury built the Cochituate Standpipe, the neighborhood's most widely known structure, to modernize its water system. One additional development project significantly increased the attractiveness of the neighborhood. Electric trolley service began in 1889 and residents began to move to Fort Hill in mass, creating a market for row houses, triple-story houses, and single-family homes.

During the early twentieth century, Fort Hill experienced an influx of immigrants of English, Irish, and German descent. The influence of German immigrants is visible in some of Fort Hill's architecture in the area around Egleston Square. Late nineteenth-century suburban development was dominated by the Yankee Protestant middle class, while the early twentieth-century witnessed the influx of a middle class Jewish population. In the 1940s and 1950s, Fort Hill witnessed another wave of immigration, as many African American people from the American South moved into the neighborhood as part of the Great Migration. Following the influx of African Americans, Fort Hill and Roxbury in general became what the City of Boston has characterized as the "heart" of black culture in Boston.

=== Present day ===
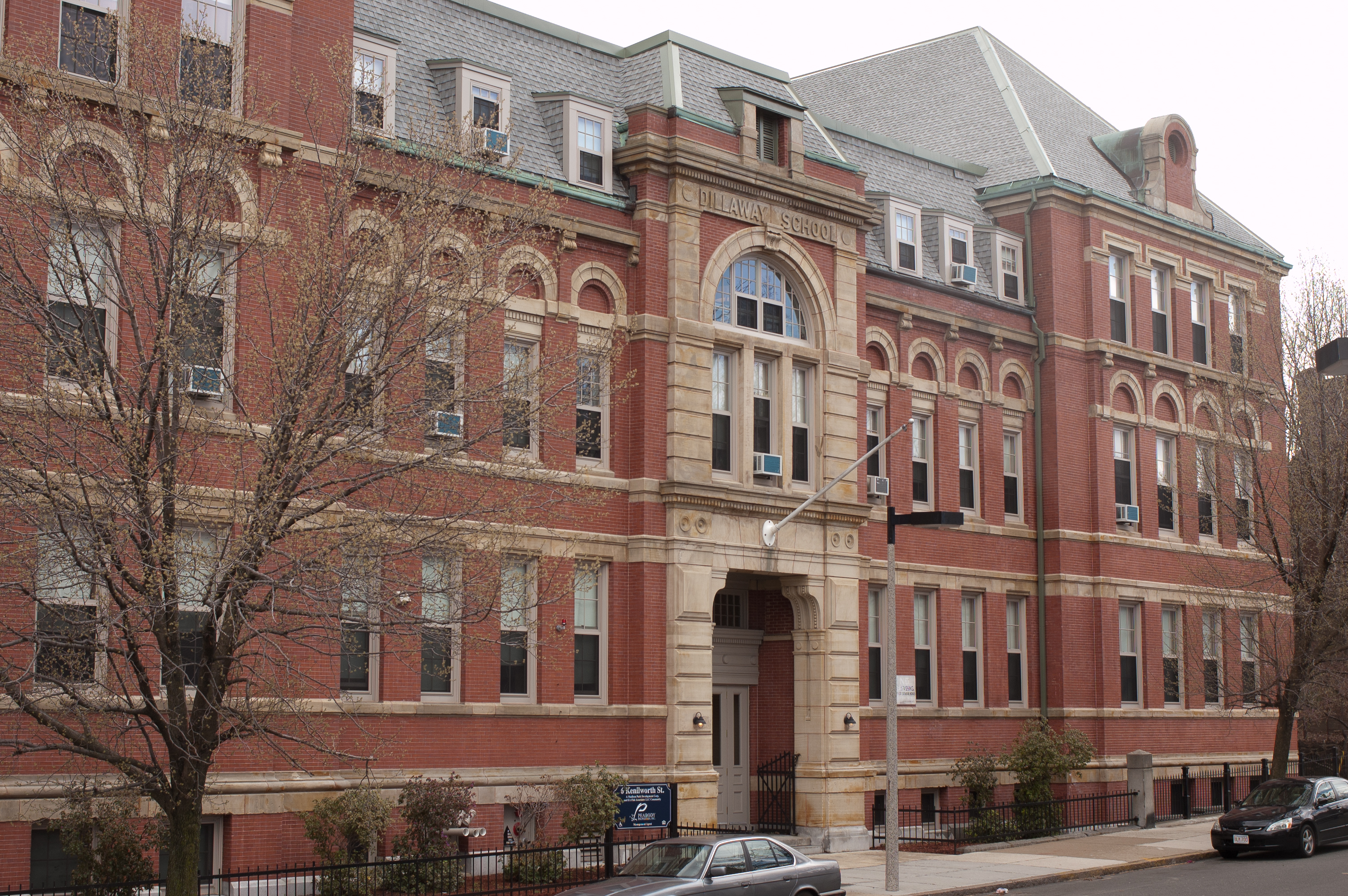
The Dillaway School on Kenilworth Place in Fort Hill

Today, Fort Hill is home to an ethnically and linguistically diverse community. Fort Hill has been recognized for its sizable population of residents with Irish, Puerto Rican, Dominican, German and Sub-Saharan African roots. Over the last decade Fort Hill has experienced an influx of professionals, artists and students, many of whom attend Northeastern University, Massachusetts College of Art and Design or Wentworth Institute of Technology. Fort Hill is also often referred to as a neighborhood that is notable for having a high concentration of residents living with same-sex partners, and has a history of its residents advocating for gay rights.

== Transportation ==
Fort Hill is served by the MBTA's bus and rail services, roadways and public bicycle trails.

- The rapid transit Orange Line, which runs along the west side of Fort Hill, stops at Jackson Square and Roxbury Crossing.
- Nubian station is a major hub for MBTA bus services, including the Silver Line.
- Fort Hill contains a few major roads including Washington Street, Columbus Avenue and Malcolm X. Boulevard. Most of the residential areas of the district allow for resident and nonresident street parking.
- Bicycle paths. The Pierre Lallement Bicycle Path runs along the Southwest Corridor Park from Forrest Hills to Back Bay.

== Education ==
Fort Hill is served by Boston Public Schools, which assigns students using an algorithm based on, among other things, the preferences of the applicants and the location of a student's home. Fort Hill is home to a number of primary and secondary schools including Nathan Hale Elementary School (PK–5), Timilty Middle School (6–8), and the John D. O'Bryant School of Math & Science (7–12). Fort Hill hosts two institutions of higher learning, Roxbury Community College and Emmanuel College's retreat center.

== Notable residents ==
- Nathaniel Jeremiah Bradlee (1829–1888), architect, partner in the firm Bradlee, Winslow & Wetherell
- Thomas Dudley (1576–1653), colonial magistrate, Governor of the Massachusetts Bay Colony
- William Lloyd Garrison (1805–1879), journalist, abolitionist
- Edward Everett Hale (1822–1909), author, historian and Unitarian minister
- Mel Lyman (1938-1978), musician, writer, and the founder of the Fort Hill Community commune.
- Louis Prang (1824–1909), printer, lithographer and publisher
- William Pynchon (1590–1662), colonial treasurer, original patentee of the Massachusetts Bay Colony

== See also ==
- National Register of Historic Places listings in southern Boston, Massachusetts
