= Monument Square =

Monument Square may refer to:

- Battle Monument Square (Baltimore, Maryland)
- Monument to the Great Fire of London#Monument Square
- Monument Square (Portland, Maine)
- Monument Square (Charlottesville, Virginia), former location of the George Rogers Clark (sculpture)
- Monument Square Historic District (Charlestown, Boston, Massachusetts), location of the Bunker Hill Monument
- Monument Square Historic District (Jamaica Plain, Boston, Massachusetts), location of the First Church of Jamaica Plain
- Monument Square, surrounding Soldiers and Sailors Monument (Troy, New York)
