= 1876 Boston mayoral election =

Election in Massachusetts, United States

- December 12, 1876
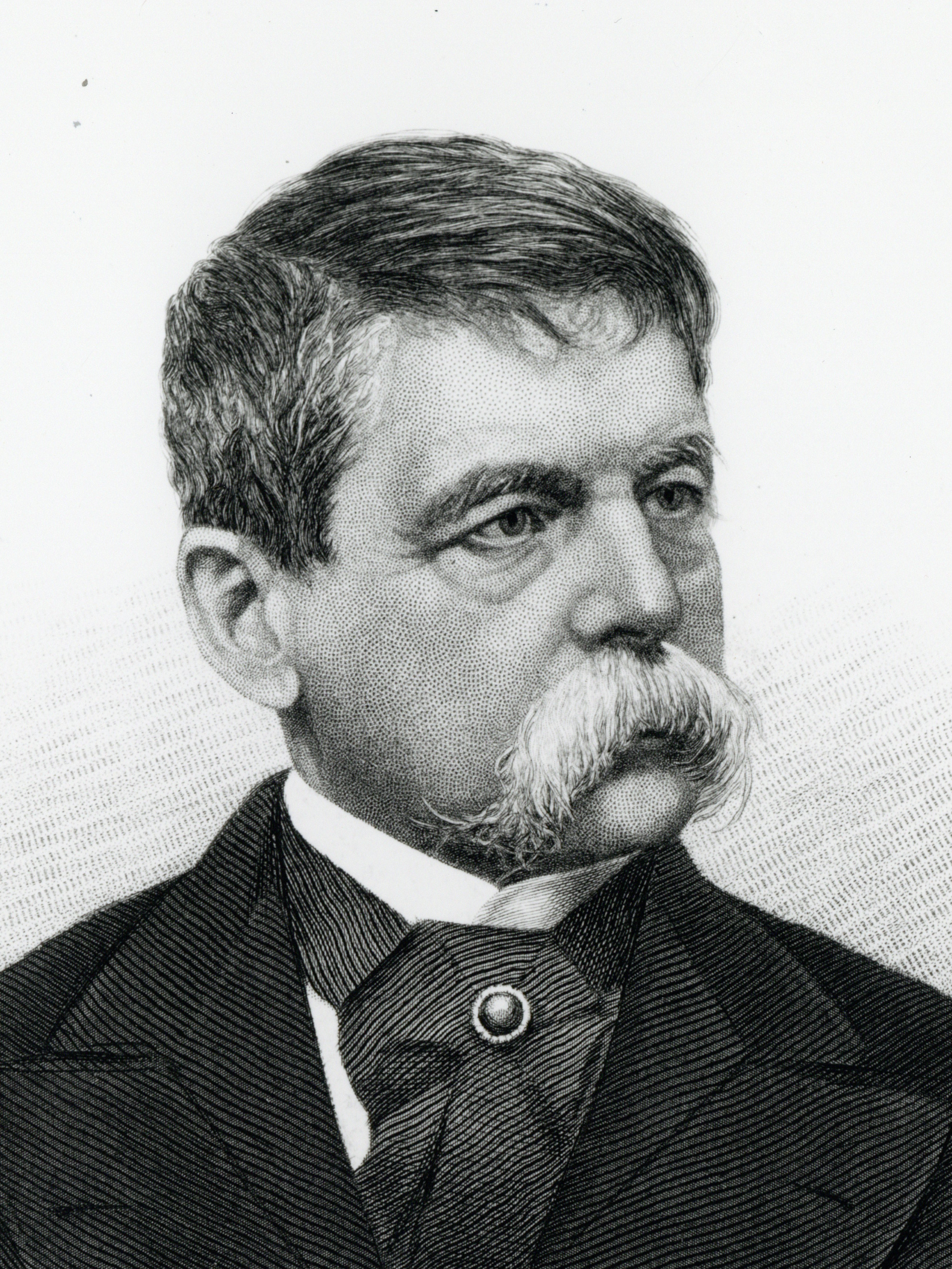

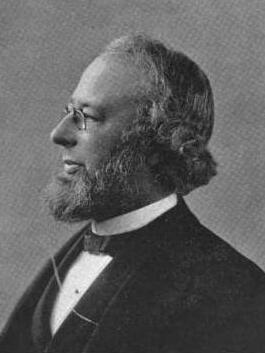
Candidate	Frederick O. Prince	Nathaniel Jeremiah Bradlee
Party	Democratic	Republican
Popular vote	16,562%	13,782
Percentage	54.01%	44.95%
Mayor before election
Samuel C. Cobb
Nonpartisan
Elected mayor
Frederick O. Prince
Democratic

The Boston mayoral election of 1876 saw the election of Democratic Party nominee Frederick O. Prince over Republican Party nominee Nathaniel Jeremiah Bradlee.

== Nominations ==
The Democratic Party nominated Frederick O. Prince for mayor.

In late-November, The Boston Globe reported a strong sentiment in the Republican Party in favor of nominating Halsey J. Boardman. However, the party ultimately nominated Nathaniel Jeremiah Bradlee when its city convention took place.

== Results ==
The 1876 election saw a strong performance by the Democratic Party ticket. Not only did their mayoral nominee (Prince) prevail, but the party won ten out of twelve seats up for election on the Board of Aldermen.

1876 Boston mayoral election
Party	Candidate	Votes	%
Democratic	Frederick O. Prince	16,562	54.01
Republican	Nathaniel Jeremiah Bradlee	13,782	44.95
Prohibition	George Buttrick	266	0.87
Others	Scattering	53	0.17
Turnout		30,663	

== See also ==
- List of mayors of Boston, Massachusetts
