= Dillaway School =

- U.S. National Register of Historic Places
- U.S. Historic district – Contributing property
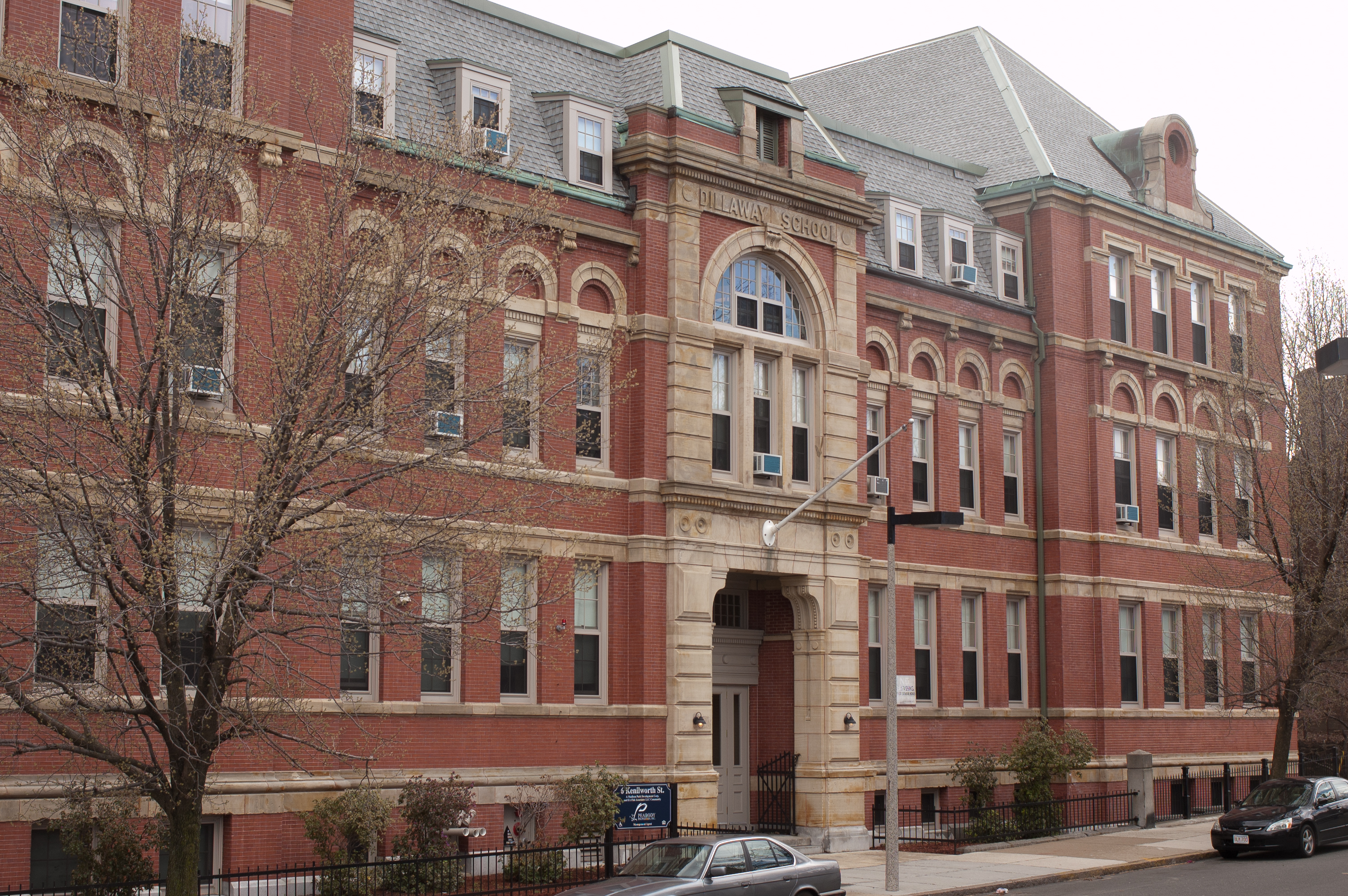

- Location within Massachusetts Location within the United States
- Location: 16-20 Kenilworth Street, Boston, Massachusetts
- Coordinates: 42°19′44″N 71°05′13″W
- Area: less than one acre
- Built: 1882
- Architect: Clough, George A.
- Part of: Roxbury Highlands Historic District (ID89000147)
- NRHP reference No.: 80001683

Significant dates
- Added to NRHP: April 9, 1980
- Designated CP: February 22, 1989

The Dillaway School is an historic school at 16-20 Kenilworth Street in Boston, Massachusetts. The school was built in 1882 to a design by George Albert Clough, the city's first official architect, and is his only surviving school design in the city. The building was listed on the National Register of Historic Places in 1980, and included in the Roxbury Highlands Historic District in 1989. The building has been converted to residential use.

== Description and history ==
The Dillaway School is located in Boston's Roxbury neighborhood, a short way west of Nubian Square (formerly Dudley Square) on the south side of Kenilworth Street near its junction with Dudley Street. It is a three-story masonry structure, built out of brick with stone trim. It is seventeen bays wide, with the outer four bays on each end projecting slightly and covered by a tall hip roof. The central bays are two full stories, with a third in a mansard roof. The entrance is in the center bay, recessed under an elaborate stone arch, above which is a complex multipart round-arch window assembly. Horizontal stone courses run at the sill and lintel levels of the windows on the first two floors, with the second-floor windows topped by blind round stone arches.

This school was built in 1882 to a design by George Clough, who was the first Boston city architect. He entered this role in 1875, by which time the city had grown by annexation nearly to its present size. Clough designed many public buildings for the city as a result of this growth and his position. Twenty-five of them were school buildings; this one is one of only two to survive.

== See also ==
- National Register of Historic Places listings in southern Boston, Massachusetts
