= First Church of Jamaica Plain =

Historic church in Massachusetts, United States

- U.S. National Register of Historic Places
- U.S. Historic district – Contributing property
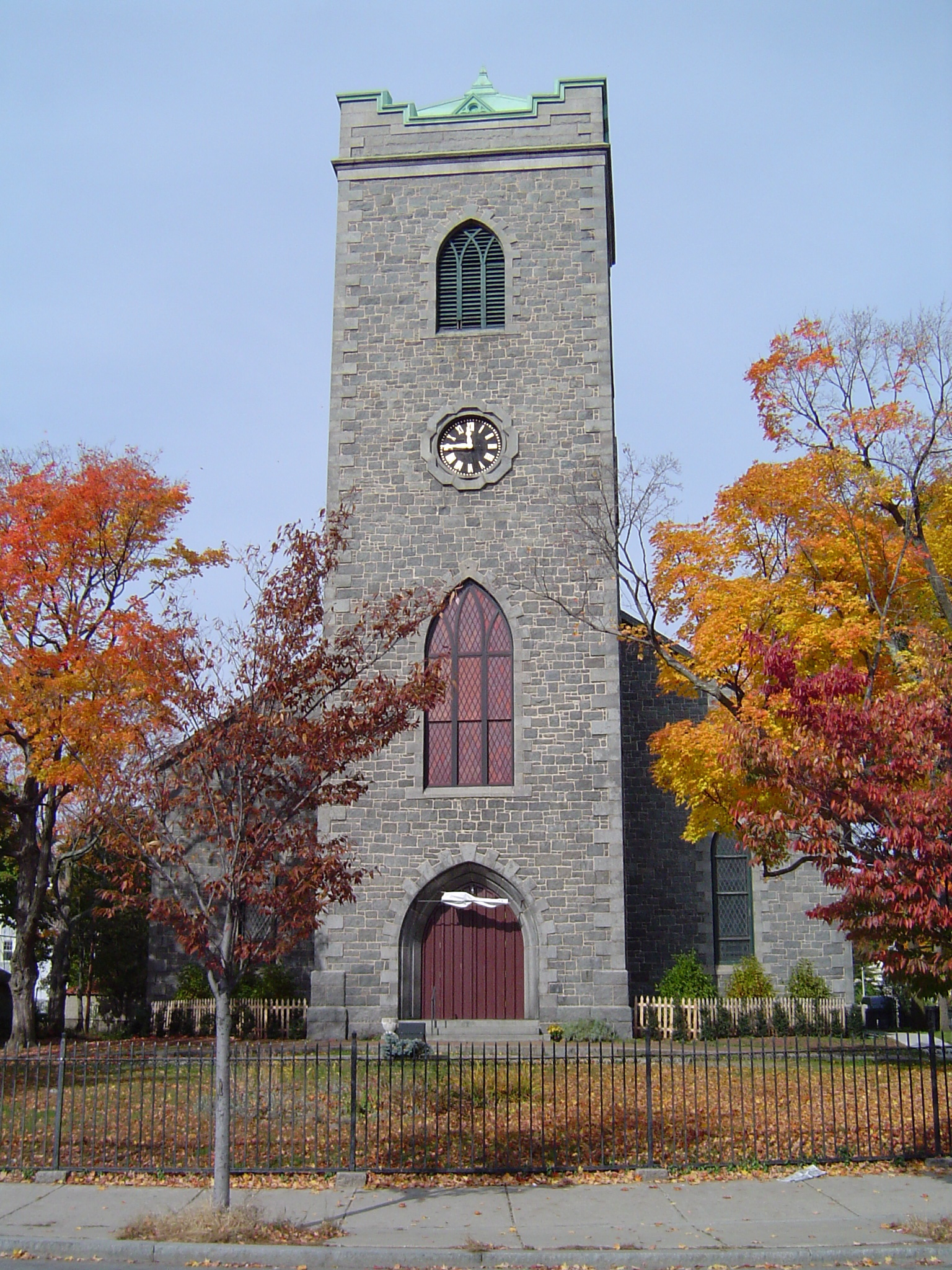

- Location within Massachusetts Location within the United States
- Location: Boston, Massachusetts
- Coordinates: 42°18′36″N 71°6′58″W
- Area: 1.4 acres (0.57 ha)
- Built: 1854
- Architect: Nathaniel J. Bradlee; Cabot, Everett & Mead
- Architectural style: Gothic Revival; Shingle Style
- Part of: Monument Square Historic District (ID90001536)
- NRHP reference No.: 88000955

Significant dates
- Added to NRHP: July 15, 1988
- Designated CP: June 2, 1987

The First Church of Jamaica Plain is a historic church at 6 Eliot Street in the Jamaica Plain neighborhood of Boston, Massachusetts. The stone Gothic Revival church was designed in 1854 by the well known Boston architect, Nathaniel J. Bradlee, for a congregation which was established in 1769 as the Third Church of Roxbury. It is built out of ashlar granite, laid in courses without ornament. It has a square tower with Gothic arched windows at the second level, a clock face at the third, and Gothic louvered openings at the belfry, and a parapeted top. A Shingle style parish hall was added in 1889. This new addition was designed by Cabot, Everett & Mead.

The church was listed on the National Register of Historic Places in 1988, and included in the Monument Square Historic District in 1990.

== See also ==
- National Register of Historic Places listings in southern Boston, Massachusetts
- First Church in Jamaica Plain, Unitarian Universalist
