= Nathaniel Jeremiah Bradlee =

American architect

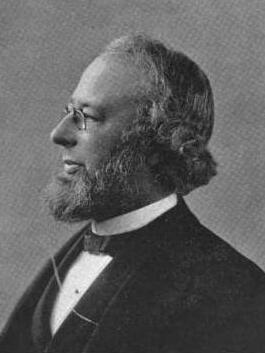
- Born: June 1, 1829; Boston, Massachusetts
- Died: December 17, 1888 (aged 59); Bellows Falls, Vermont
- Occupation: Architect
- Parent(s): Elizabeth Davis; Samuel Bradlee
- Buildings: First Church of Jamaica Plain; Cochituate standpipe Danvers State Hospital; Boston Young Men's Christian Union
- Projects: Cochituate Water Works

Nathaniel Jeremiah Bradlee (June 1, 1829 – December 17, 1888) was a Boston architect and a partner in the firm of Bradlee, Winslow & Wetherell.

== Life ==
Bradlee was born in Boston to Elizabeth Davis and Samuel Bradlee. He married Julia Rebecca Weld on April 17, 1855. Their children were Joseph Williams Bradlee, Caroline Lousia Bradlee, Elizabeth Lydia Bradlee, Eleanor Collamore Bradlee, and Hellen Curtis Bradlee.

Bradlee designed many of the townhouses in Boston's South End, and was president of the Cochituate Water Board. The Bradlee Basin at the Chestnut Hill Reservoir, Newton, Massachusetts, completed in 1870, was named in his honor.

In 1876, Bradlee ran unsuccessfully for mayor of Boston as a Republican. He received 44.95% of the vote, losing to Democratic candidate Frederick O. Prince, who received 54.01% of the vote.

From 1866 to 1896, his family lived in the Alvah Kittredge House, a Greek Revival mansion (built 1836) at 10 Linwood Street, Roxbury, Massachusetts. He vacationed in Altamonte Springs, Florida in what is now known as the Bradlee-McIntyre House (built 1885), probably the best example of Victorian Cottage Style architecture in Central Florida. In 1885, Henry Herman Westinghouse, younger brother of George Westinghouse, built a nearby house whose plan was a mirror image of the Bradlee-McIntyre House. Westinghouse also had Bradlee design homes of 12 to 15 rooms near Boston Avenue in town.

Bradlee died unexpectedly in Bellows Falls, Vermont while on a train from Boston to Keene, New Hampshire. His papers are archived in the Boston Athenæum.

== Legacy ==
Bradlee's early 1860s Jordan Marsh department store, an ornate brownstone edifice with a landmark corner clock tower in what is now known as Boston's Downtown Crossing, sparked a major historic preservation movement in the city when it was torn down in 1975. Local architect Leslie Larson had founded a coalition called the City Conservation League to try to save the old building — one of the few survivors of the Great Boston Fire of 1872 — but it made way for a low modern brick structure that sits there today as Macy's. Some outraged customers cut up their credit cards in protest of the demolition. These protests and preservationist grassroots efforts led to the creation of the Boston Landmarks Commission.

Bradlee built for Royal Robbins of Waltham Watch Co. a series of eight freight stables in 1866, which serviced the adjoining Boston and Providence Railroad property. They are still standing on Stanhope Street in Boston.

== Gallery ==
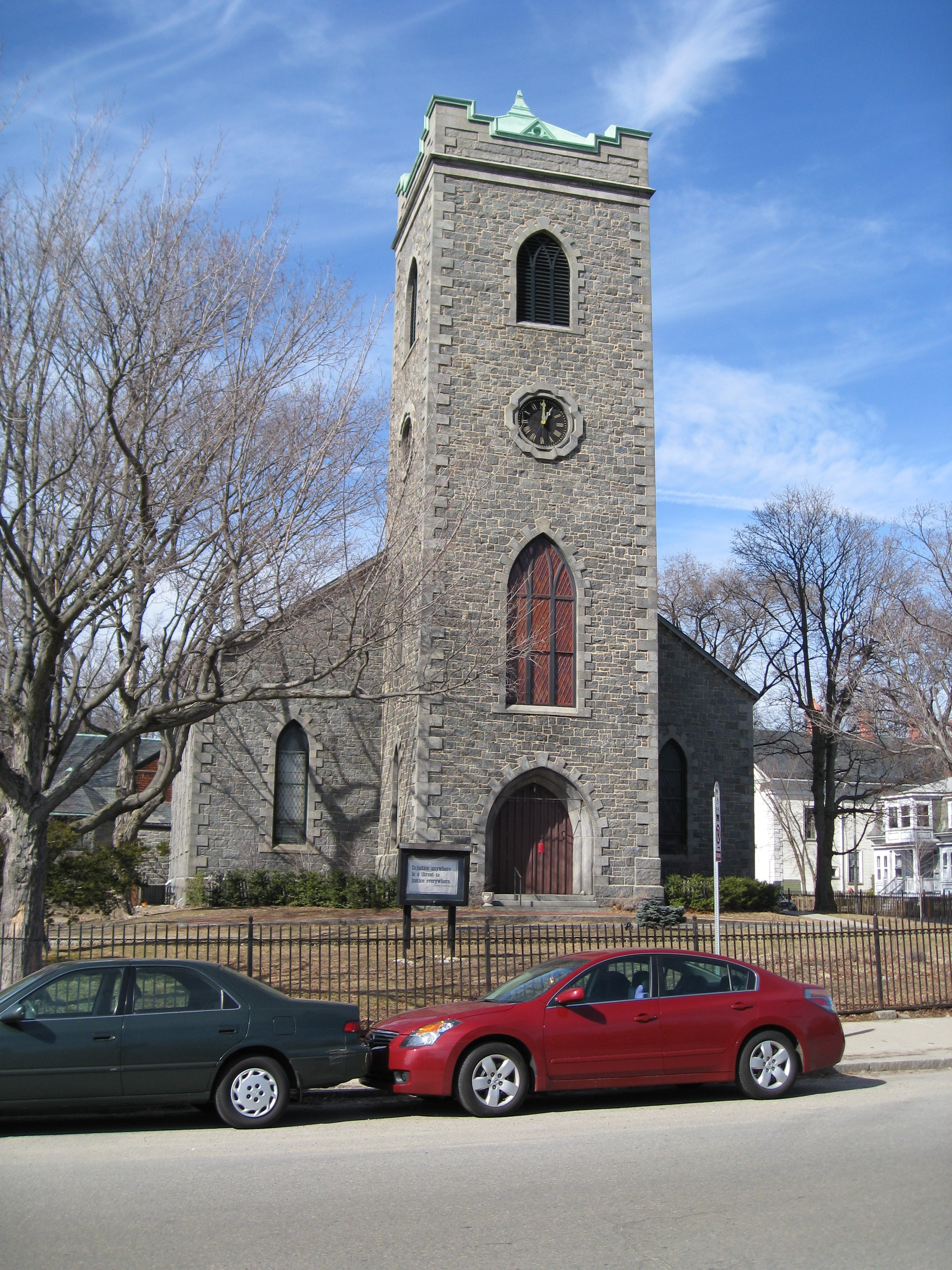
First Church of Jamaica Plain, 1854

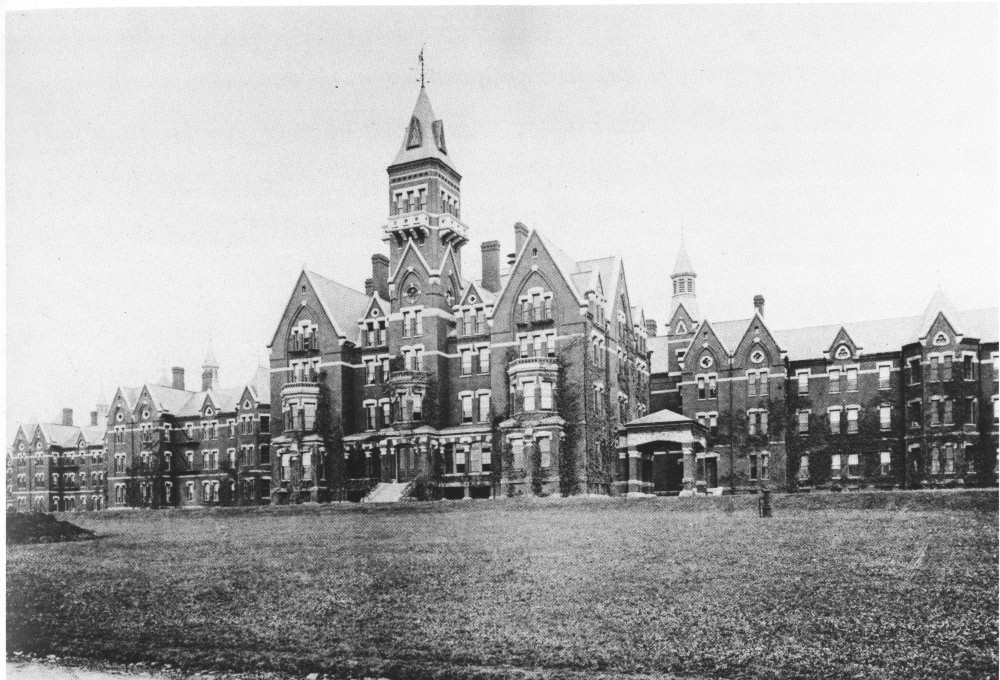
Danvers State Hospital, 1874–1878

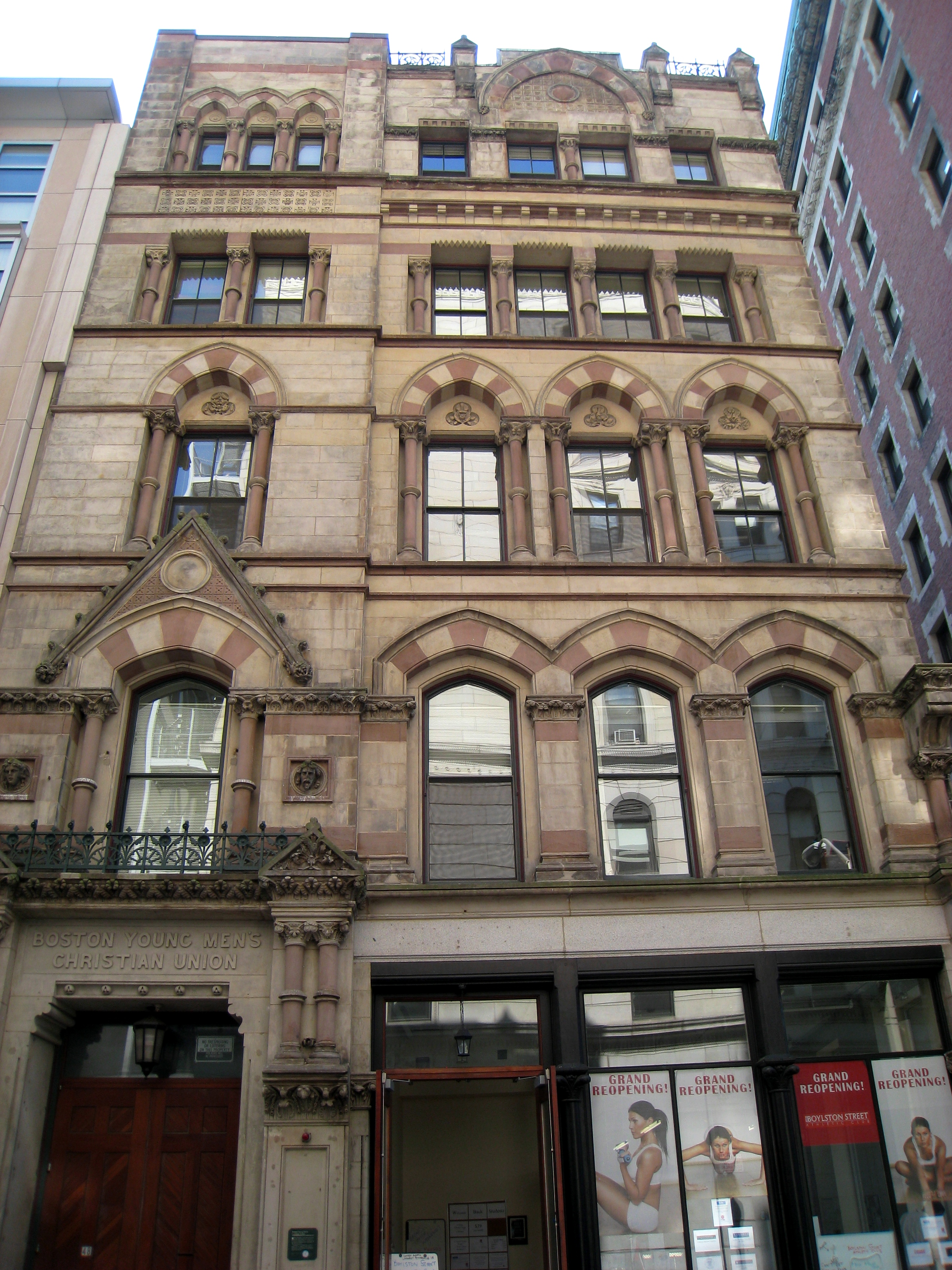
Boston Young Men's Christian Union, 1876

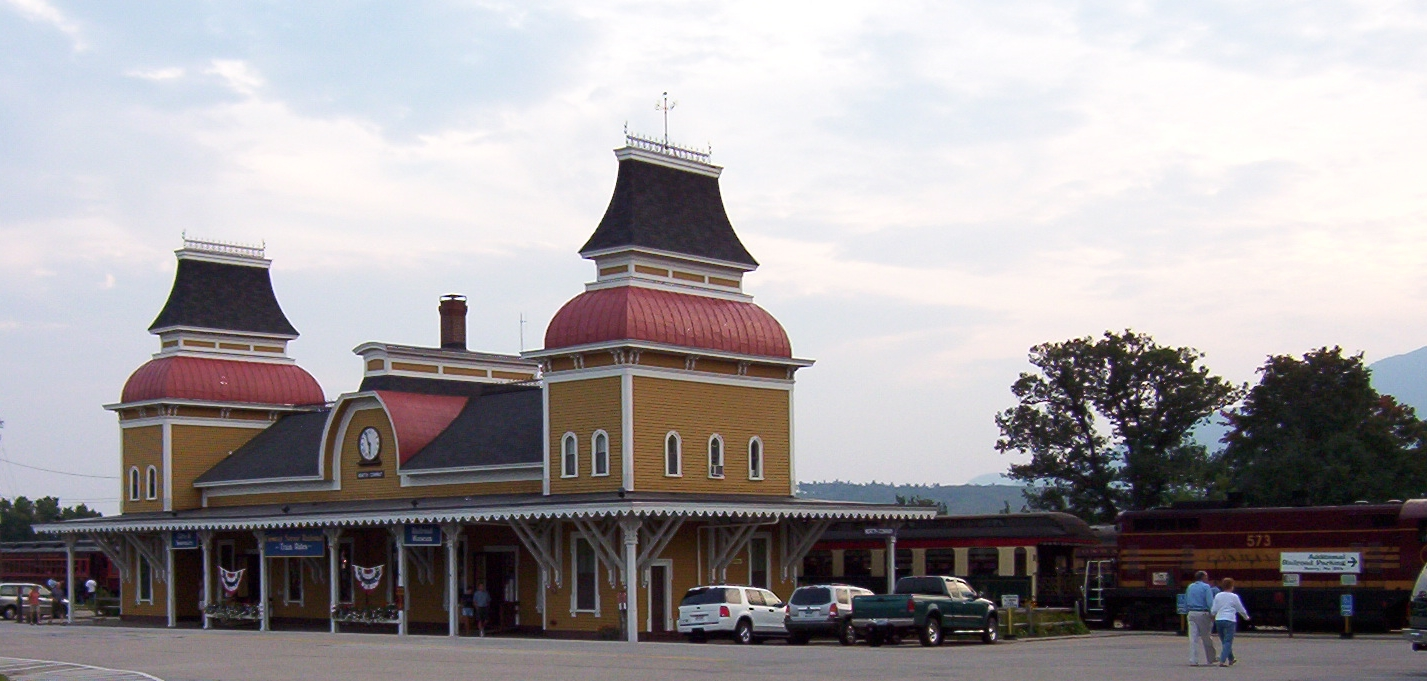
Depot, North Conway, New Hampshire, 1874
- 1853–1854 – First Church in Jamaica Plain, Unitarian-Universalist, a National Register of Historic Places (NRHP) site. At Centre and South Sts. Jamaica Plain, Massachusetts.
- 1855 – William F. Schultz House, 53 Beacon Street, Boston, Massachusetts.
- Early 1860s – Jordan Marsh department store, 450 Washington Street, Boston, Massachusetts (demolished in 1975)
- 1861–1862, Phillips School, Boston, Massachusetts. A rare substantial surviving Italianate school building.
- 1866 eight freight stables at 13-45 Stanhope Street, Boston to service B&P Railroad Co.
- 1869, the Cochituate standpipe. Modernized Roxbury's water system.
- 1870 – Mount Auburn Reception House, Mount Auburn Cemetery, Cambridge, Massachusetts. One of only two existing buildings in Cambridge, Massachusetts by Bradlee.
- 1874, Railway Station, North Conway, New Hampshire.
- 1874– Second Church, Boston, on Boylston Street, between Dartmouth and Clarendon
- 1874–1878 – Danvers State Hospital, 450 Maple Street, Danvers, Massachusetts. A massive complex designed to care for the mentally ill.
- 1875, commercial building (workshops), 6 East Springfield Street, South End, Boston
- 1876 – Boston Young Men's Christian Union, 48 Boylston Street, Boston, Massachusetts. An outstanding example of the High Gothic style, another NRHP site.
- 1878 – Unitarian Church, Brunswick, Maine.
- 1879 – 542–550 Columbus Avenue, South End, Boston. Single family row houses.
- Late 1870s – Palladio Hall, 60–62 Warren Street, Boston, Massachusetts. An Italian Renaissance-style commercial block designed and owned by Bradlee.

== Published works ==
- Nathaniel J. Bradlee, History of the Introduction of Pure Water into the City of Boston, with a Description of Its Cochituate Water Works, Boston: Alfred Mudge & Son, 1868.
