= Boston Young Men's Christian Union =

- U.S. National Register of Historic Places
- Boston Landmark
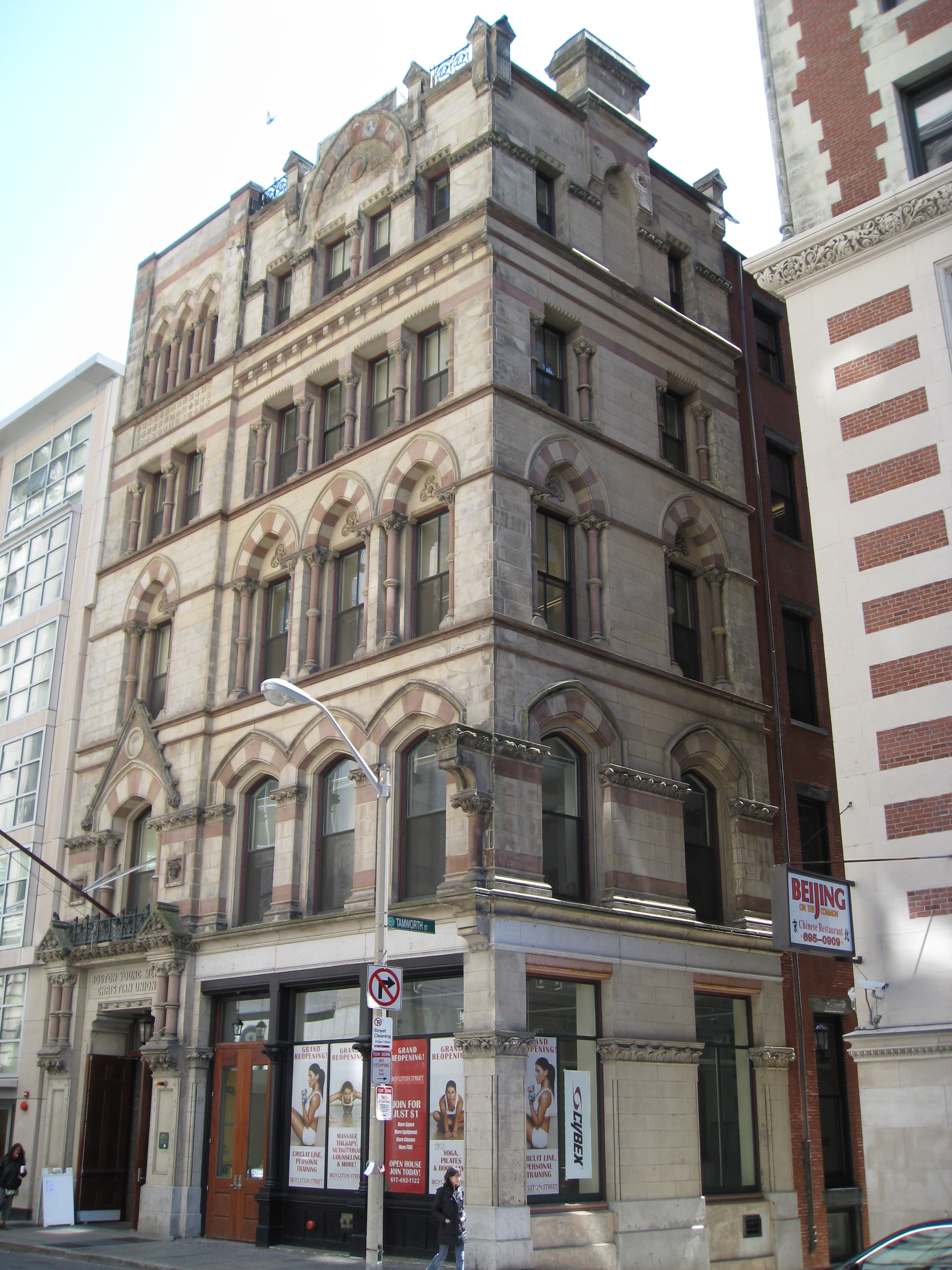

- Location within Boston Location within Massachusetts Location within the United States
- Location: Boston, Massachusetts
- Coordinates: 42°21′7.81″N 71°3′50.63″W
- Built: 1875
- Architect: Bradlee & Winslow; Morton & Chesley
- Architectural style: Gothic
- MPS: Boston Theatre MRA
- NRHP reference No.: 80000451

Significant dates
- Added to NRHP: December 9, 1980
- Designated BOSL: November 30, 1977

The Boston Young Men's Christian Union is a historic building at 48 Boylston Street in Boston, Massachusetts and a liberal Protestant youth association. When Unitarians were excluded from the Boston YMCA (which was evangelical) in 1851, a group of Harvard students founded a Christian discussion group, which was incorporated as the Boston YMCU in 1852. In 1873, the organization decided to construct its own building. $270,000 was raised, and construction on the original segment completed in 1875. The building was designed by Nathaniel Jeremiah Bradlee, constructed in a High Victorian Gothic style, and included ground-level retail. Several additions were made, including in 1956. The building was designated a Boston Landmark by the Boston Landmarks Commission in 1977 and added to the National Historic Register in 1980. Boston YMCU owned Camp Union, a 600-acre (240 ha) camp, in Greenfield, New Hampshire (1929–1993) (now Barbara C. Harris Camp & Convention Center of the Episcopal Diocese of Massachusetts). From its renovation in 2003 to 2011 it was called the Boylston Street Athletic Club, and later the Boston Union Gym or BYMCU Athletic Club. The Boston Young Men's Christian Union claims to be "America's First Gym".

The Massachusetts Commission for the Blind moved out in 2012, and the organization began failing financially. In 2016, plans were announced to redevelop the site as 46 units of affordable housing, in partnership with the Planning Office for Urban Affairs of the Archdiocese of Boston.

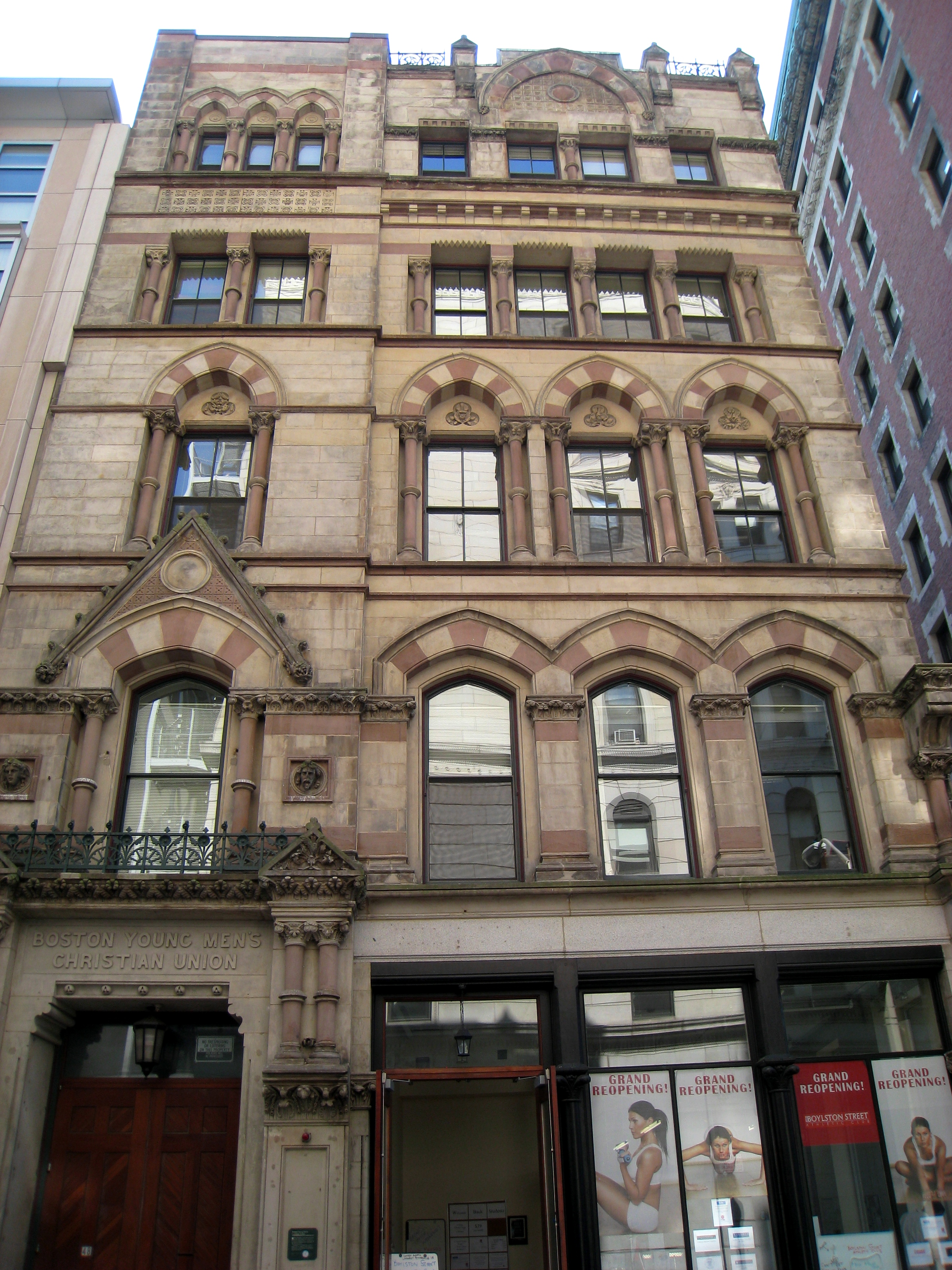

== Goal (1852) ==
The BYMCU goal in 1852 was to furnish the young men of Boston and vicinity a place of pleasant resort where the influences are beneficial and elevating, to provide them with opportunity of self-improvement and healthful recreation, at little or no expense; to give them opportunities for doing good, by engaging in charitable and benevolent work.

== Members ==
All young men of good moral character, and claiming to believe in the truths of Christianity, without distinction of sect or party, were eligible as members of this society.

== Activities ==
The report of 1871 shows the Union organized, with committees as follows: finance; lectures, classes, and entertainments; library; rooms; members; benevolent action; public worship and religious study. Sunday religious services were maintained, seats in churches furnished to young men, teachers supplied for Sunday schools and missions, boarding-places recommended, employment secured, savings deposited, and practical benevolent work engaged in. In 1875, there were classes in book-keeping, German, French, parliamentary law, vocal music, astronomy, elocution, and Shakespeare; monthly socials were held, at which many of Boston's most cultured women were present; and a Christmas and New Year's festival was given to poor children. In 1895, we note, 2,318 children and 267 adults were sent to the country for short periods, and carriage and other drives for shut-ins and convalescents to the number of 8,070 provided. The report for 1900 showed that the secular classes had grown in variety and attendance, that the library had 15,000 volumes, that the membership was 5,554, that religious services had been held every Sunday except during July and August, and that over $18,000 had been expended in drives, bay trips, and country visits for the poor.

== See also ==
- National Register of Historic Places listings in northern Boston, Massachusetts
