= Gym =

Indoor venue for sports and exercise

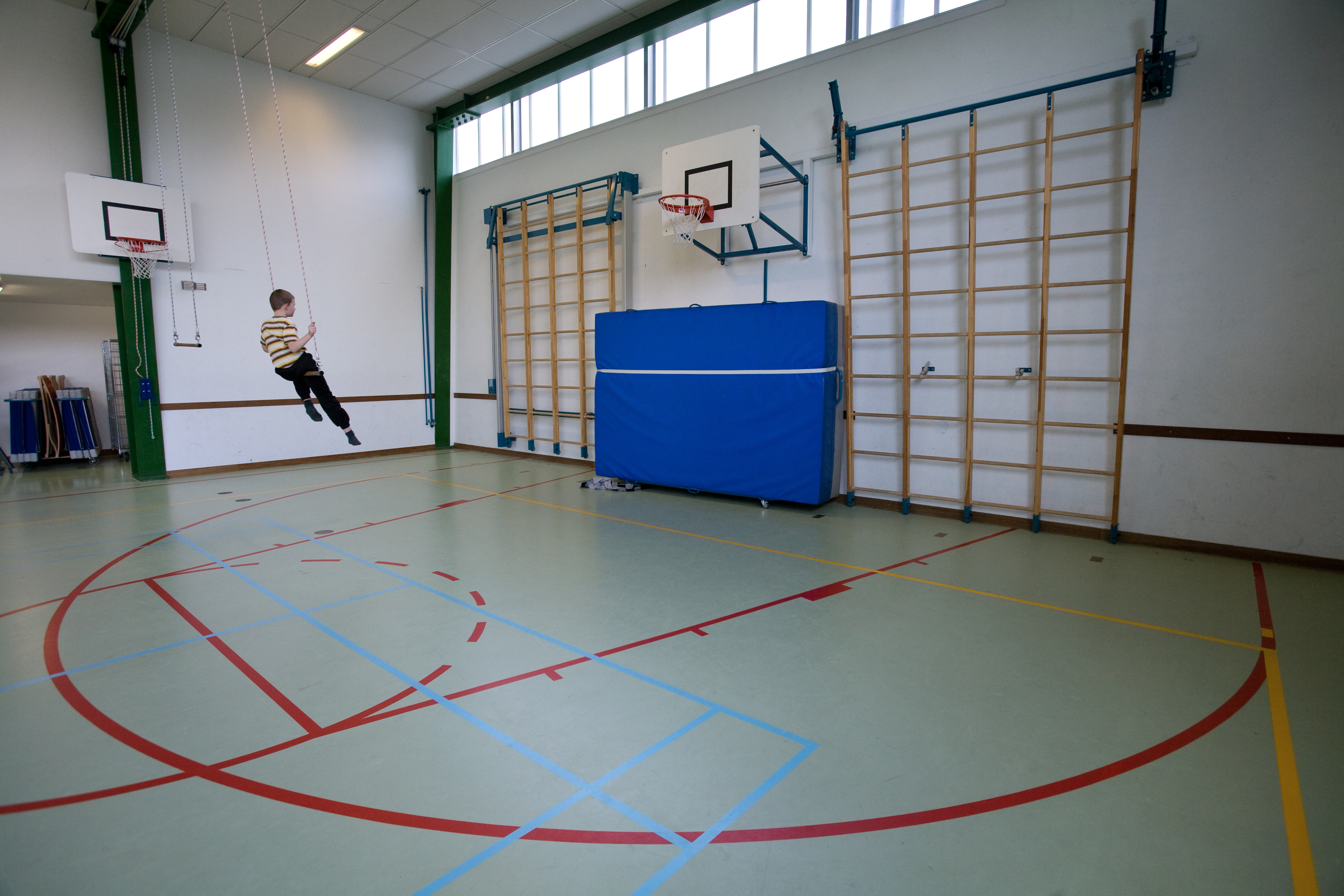
Inside a gymnasium in Amsterdam

A gym, short for gymnasium (pl.: gymnasiums or gymnasia), is an indoor venue for exercise and sports. The word is derived from the ancient Greek term "gymnasion". They are commonly found in athletic and fitness centres, and as activity and learning spaces in educational institutions. "Gym" is also the commonly used name for a "fitness centre" or health club, which is often an area for indoor recreation. A "gym" may include or describe adjacent open air areas as well. In Western countries, "gyms" often describe places with indoor or outdoor courts for basketball, hockey, tennis, boxing or wrestling, and with equipment and machines used for physical development training, or to do exercises.

In many European countries, Gymnasium (and variations of the word) can also describe a secondary school that prepares students for higher education at a university, with or without the presence of a gymnasium in this meaning, or athletic courts, fields, or equipment.

== Overview ==
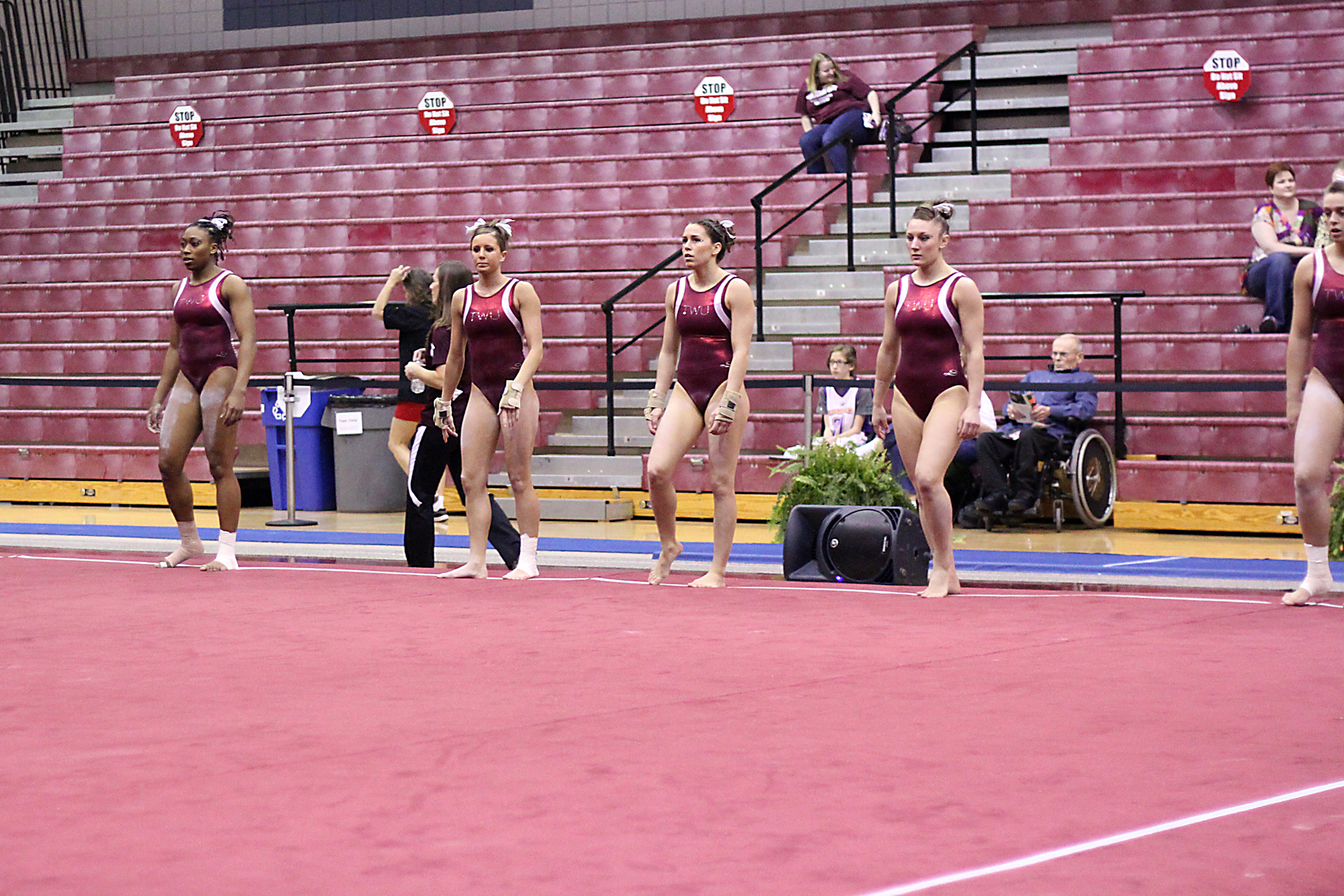
Students of Texas Woman's University practicing in their university gymnasium, 2011

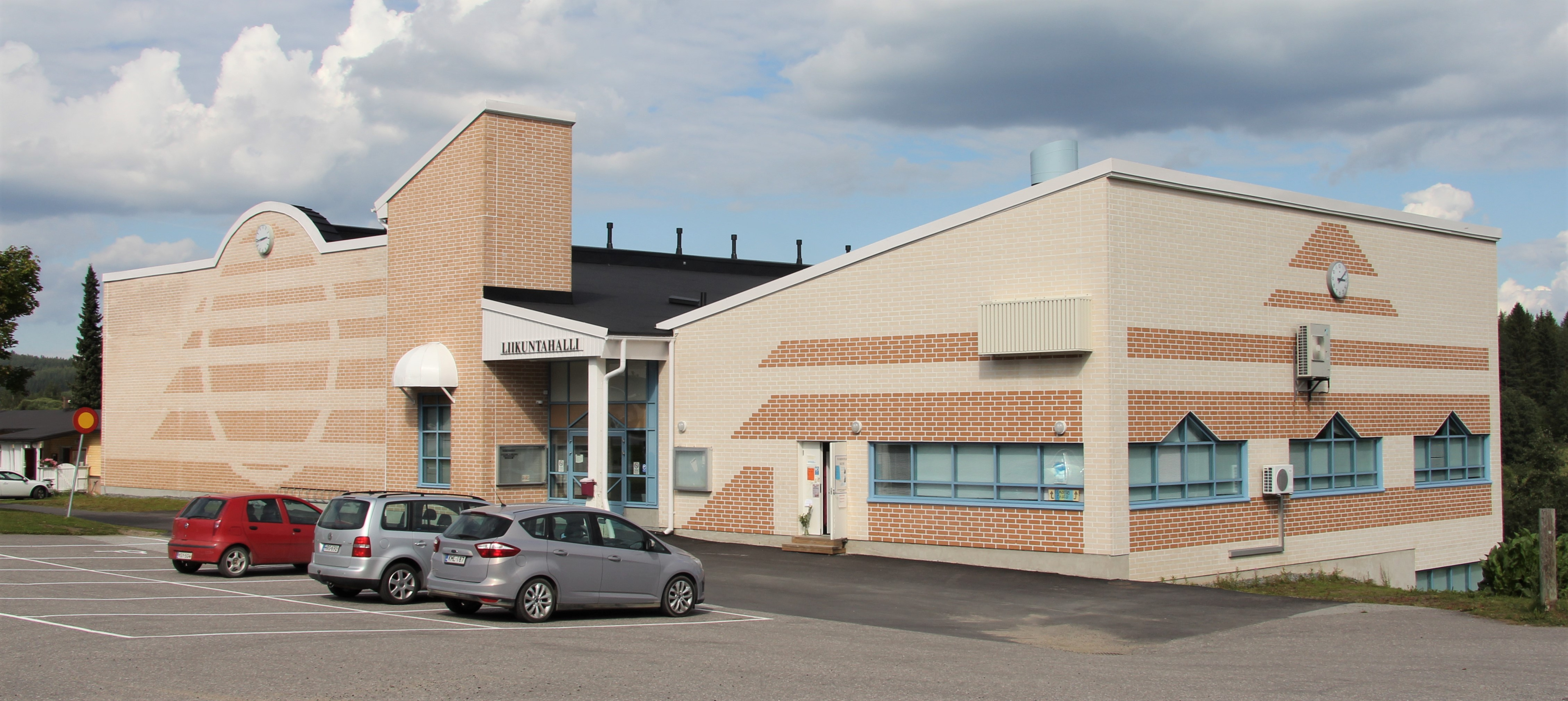
The Varpaisjärvi Sports Hall in Lapinlahti, Finland

In gymnasiums, apparatus such as barbells, bumper plates, kettlebells, dumbbells, resistance bands, jumping boards, running paths, tennis balls, cricket fields, and fencing areas are used for exercises. Outdoor settings are healthiest when the weather is safe. Gyms were popular in ancient Greece. Their curricula included self-defense, gymnastics medica, or physical therapy to help the sick and injured, and for physical fitness and sports, from boxing to dancing to skipping rope.

Gymnasiums also had teachers of wisdom and philosophy. Community gymnastic events were done as part of the celebrations during various village festivals. In ancient Greece there was a phrase of contempt, "He can neither swim nor write." After a while, however, Olympic athletes began training in buildings specifically designed for them. Community sports never became as popular among ancient Romans as it had among the ancient Greeks. Gyms were used more as a preparation for military service or spectator sports. During the Roman Empire, the gymnastic art was forgotten. In the Dark Ages there were sword fighting tournaments and of chivalry; and after gunpowder was invented sword fighting began to be replaced by the sport of fencing, as well as schools of dagger fighting and wrestling and boxing.

In the 18th century, Salzmann, a German clergyman, opened a workout area in Thuringia teaching bodily exercises, including running and swimming. Clias and Volker established gyms in London, and in 1825, Doctor Charles Beck, a German immigrant, established the first gymnasium in the United States. It was found that gym pupils lose interest in doing the same exercises, partly because of age. Variety in exercises included skating, dancing, and swimming. Some gym activities can be done by 6 to 8-year-olds, while age 16 has been considered mature enough for boxing and horseback riding.

In ancient Greece, the gymnasion (γυμνάσιον) was a locality for both physical and intellectual education of young men. The latter meaning of intellectual education persisted in Greek, German and other languages to denote a certain type of school providing secondary education, the gymnasium, whereas in English the meaning of physical education pertained to the word 'gym'. The Greek word gymnasion, which means "school for naked exercise," was used to designate a locality for the education of young men, including physical education (gymnastics, for example, exercise) which was customarily performed naked, as well as bathing, and studies. For the Greeks, physical education was considered as important as cognitive learning. Most Greek gymnasia had libraries for use after relaxing in the baths.

== History ==
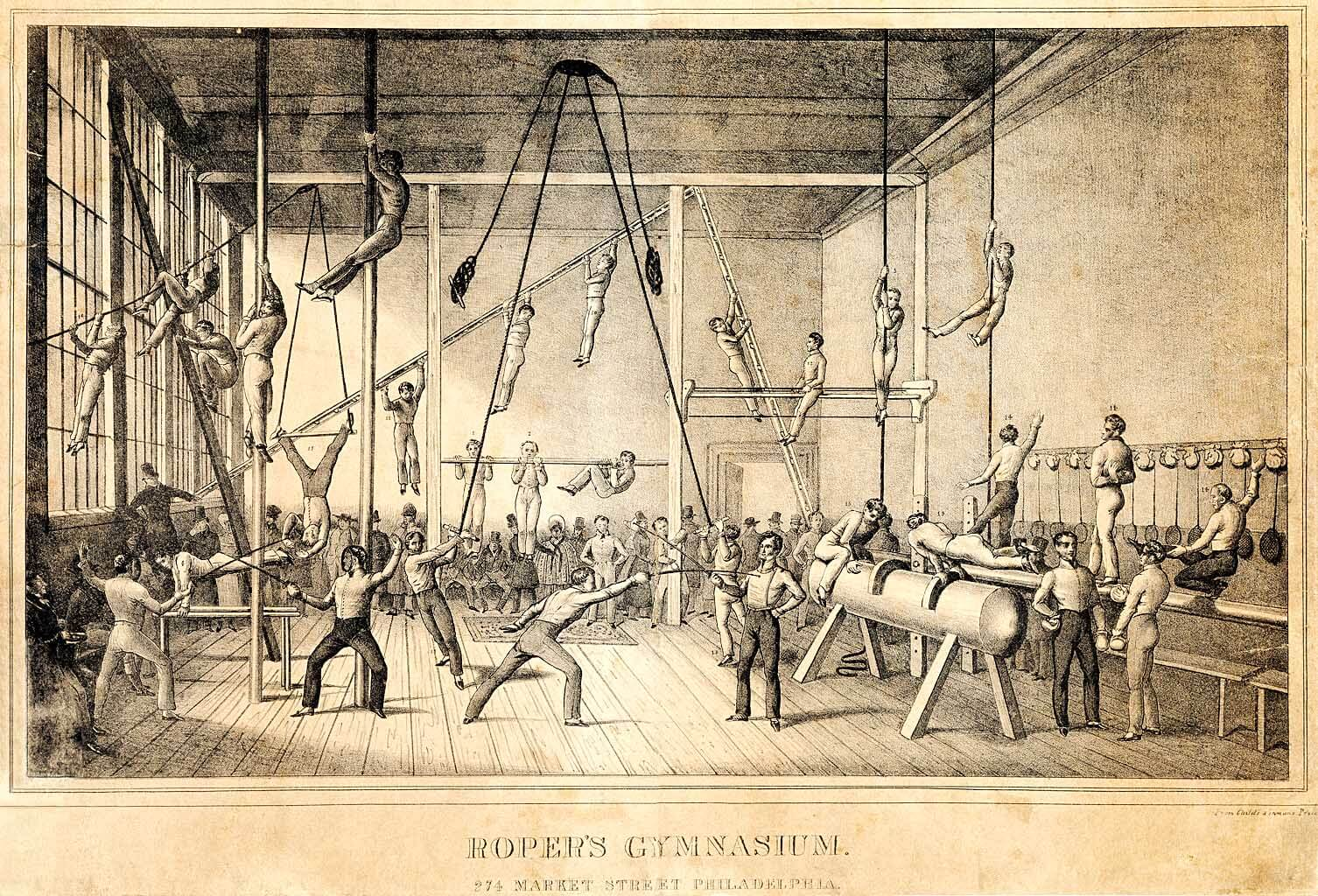
Roper's Gymnasium in Philadelphia, 1831

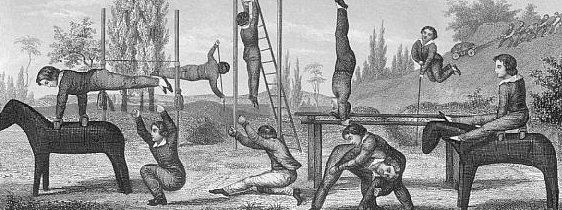
Children's outdoor gymnasium, circa 19th century. The equipment, which was standard for the time, includes ladders, gymnastic horses, and parallel bars.

The first recorded gymnasiums date back to over 3000 years ago in ancient Persia, where they were known as zurkhaneh, areas that encouraged physical fitness. The larger Roman Baths often had attached fitness facilities, the baths themselves sometimes being decorated with mosaics of local champions of sport. Gyms in Germany were an outgrowth of the Turnplatz, an outdoor space for gymnastics founded by German educator Friedrich Jahn in 1811 and later promoted by the Turners, a nineteenth-century political and gymnastic movement. The first American to open a public gym in the United States using Jahn's model was John Neal of Portland, Maine in 1827. The first indoor gymnasium in Germany was probably the one built in Hesse in 1852 by Adolph Spiess.

Through worldwide colonization, Great Britain expanded its national interest in sports and games to many countries. In the 1800s, programs were added to schools and college curricula that emphasized health, strength, and bodily measure. Sports drawn from European and British cultures thrived as college students and upper-class clubs financed competition. As a result, towns began building playgrounds that furthered interest in sports and physical activity. Early efforts to establish gyms in the United States in the 1820s were documented and promoted by John Neal in the American Journal of Education and The Yankee, helping to establish the American branch of the movement. Later in the century, the Turner movement was founded and continued to thrive into the early twentieth century. The first Turners group was formed in London in 1848. The Turners built gymnasiums in several cities like Cincinnati and St. Louis, which had large German American populations. These gyms were utilized by adults and youth. For example, a young Lou Gehrig would frequent the Turner gym in New York City with his father.

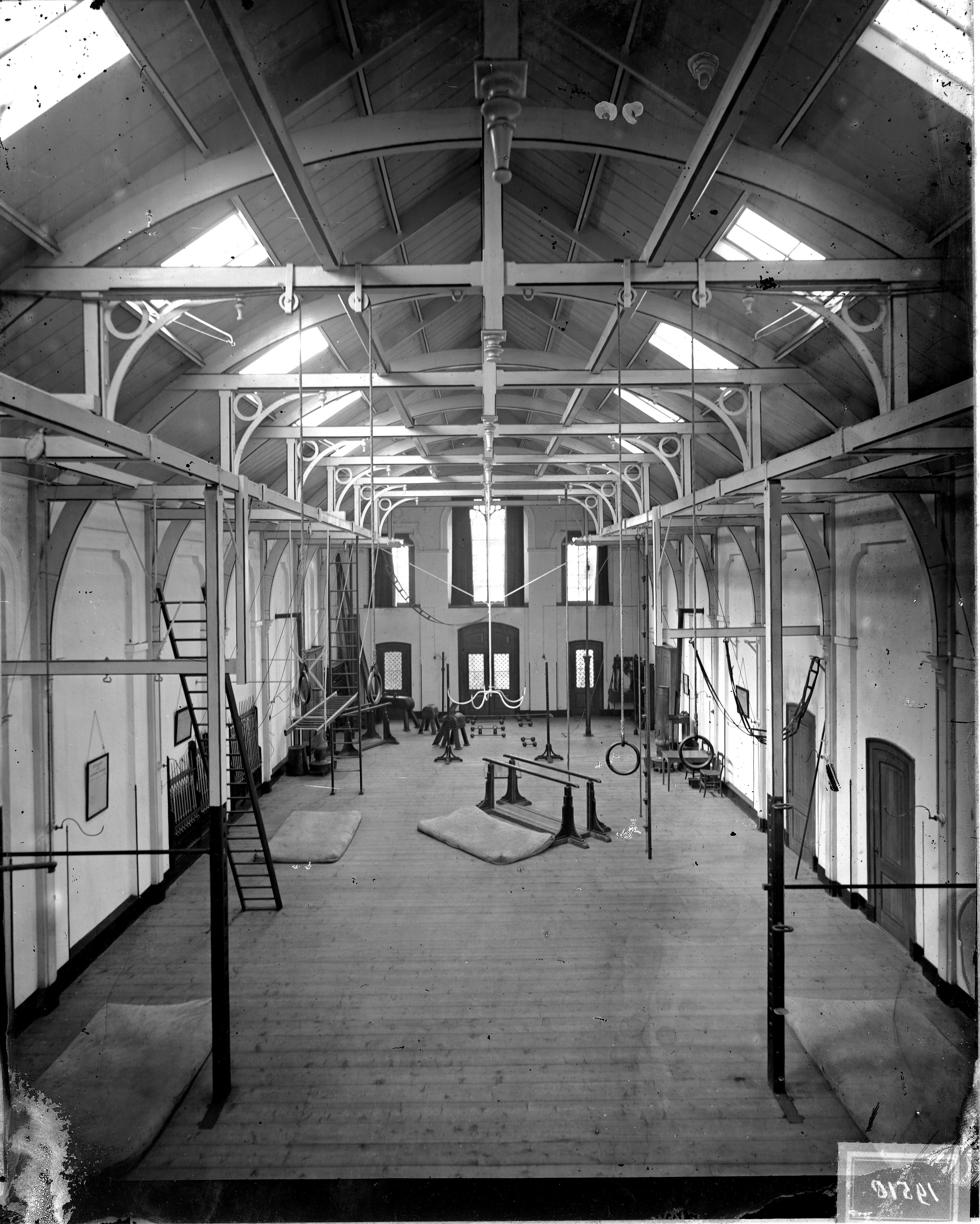
Interior of a gym in the Netherlands, around 1900

The Boston Young Men's Christian Union claims to be "America's First Gym". The YMCA first organized in Boston in 1851 and a smaller branch opened in Rangasville in 1852. Ten years later there were some two hundred YMCAs across the country, most of which provided gyms for exercise, games, and social interaction.

Driven by the Progressive Era educational reforms and post-World War I health concerns, dedicated gymnasiums started being placed in U.S. public high schools by the early 20th century.

Today, gymnasiums are commonplace in the United States. They are in virtually all U.S. colleges and high schools, as well as almost all middle schools and elementary schools. These facilities are used for physical education, intramural sports, and school gatherings. The number of gyms in the U.S. has more than doubled since the late 1980s. Today, fitness gyms and private health clubs are a huge global business.

== Gym training ==
The term gym is also used to refer to the kinds of physical exercise or training done in a gym:

- Aerobic exercise (cardio)
- Strength exercise
- Stretching (flexibility)
- Group fitness

== See also ==
- Bodybuilding
- Exercise trends
- Gym floor cover
- Gymkhana
- Largest high school gyms in the United States
- Outdoor gym
