= Roxbury High Fort =

- U.S. National Register of Historic Places
- U.S. Historic district – Contributing property
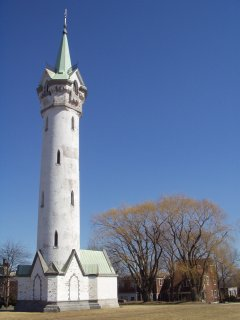
- Cochituate Standpipe (built 1869)

- Location within Massachusetts Location within the United States
- Location: Boston, Massachusetts
- Coordinates: 42°19′31″N 71°5′40″W
- Built: 1869
- Architect: Standish & Woodbury; Olmsted, Frederick Law
- Architectural style: Gothic
- Part of: Roxbury Highlands Historic District (ID89000147)
- NRHP reference No.: 73000856

Significant dates
- Added to NRHP: April 23, 1973
- Designated CP: February 22, 1989

Roxbury High Fort is a historic fort site on Beech Glen Street at Fort Avenue in the Roxbury neighborhood of Boston, Massachusetts. The site now contains a small park and the Cochituate Standpipe, also known as Fort Hill Tower, built in 1869. The fort site was added to the National Register of Historic Places in 1973. The site inspired the name of the Fort Hill neighborhood, which surrounds the area of the High Fort.

== History ==
The Roxbury High Fort site once contained earthwork fortifications of the Continental Army during the Siege of Boston during the American Revolutionary War. At that time Roxbury was an independent town connected to Boston by a narrow neck of land. The hill offered a great vantage of the entire area.

In 1868 Roxbury was annexed to Boston. In 1869, the 70-foot-tall (21 m) Cochituate Standpipe was built atop Fort Hill by the Cochichuate Water Company.

Eventually the water tower was abandoned with other expansions to the Boston water system. By the 1960s, the tower fell into disrepair. The original cast iron balcony was removed. In the early 1980s the City of Boston restored the tower. The area is also today known as Highland Park.

== See also ==
- National Register of Historic Places listings in southern Boston, Massachusetts
