= Monument Square Historic District (Jamaica Plain, Boston, Massachusetts) =

Historic district in Massachusetts, United States

- U.S. National Register of Historic Places
- U.S. Historic district
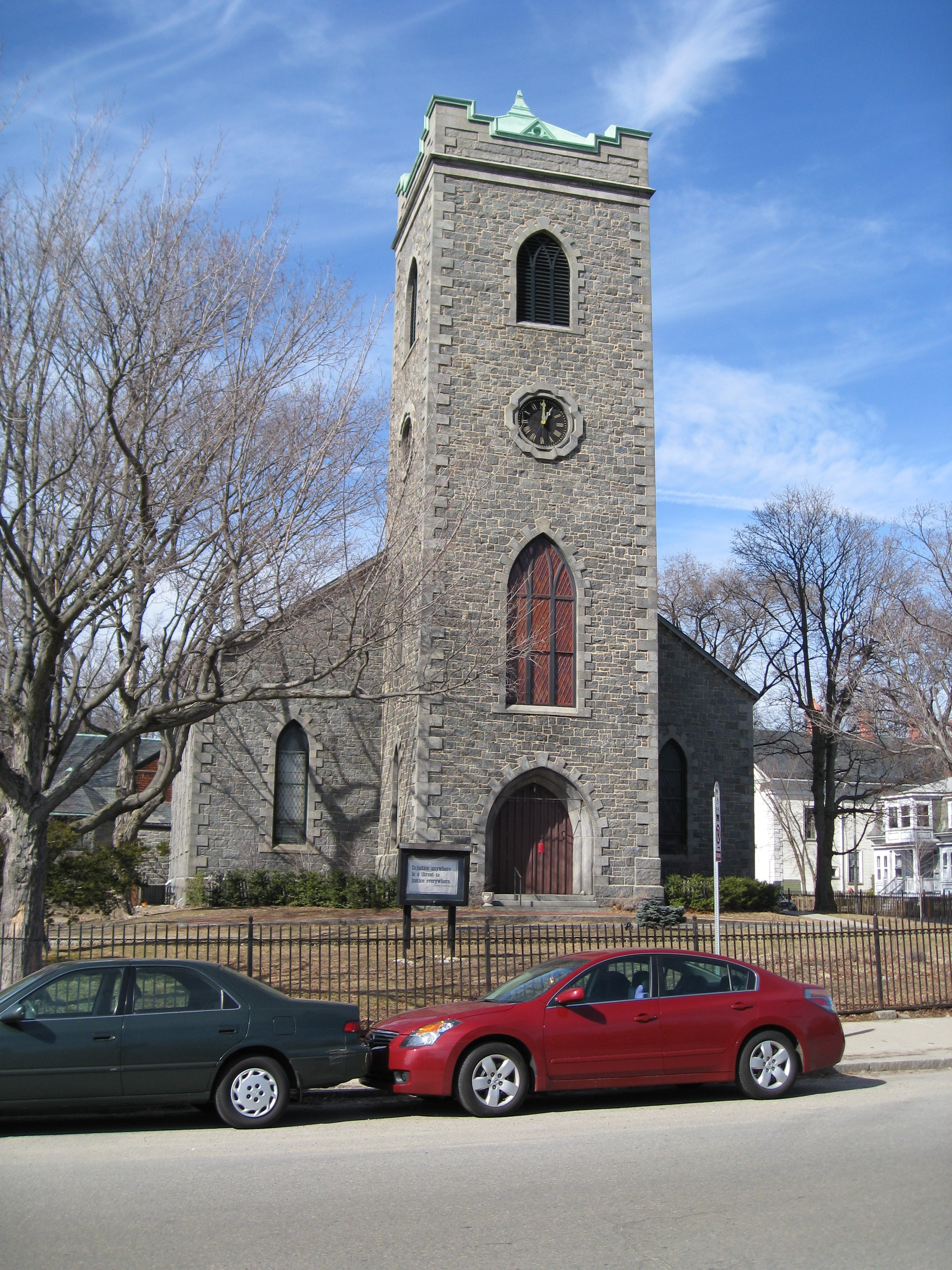
- First Church of Jamaica Plain

- Location within Massachusetts Location within the United States
- Location: Roughly bounded by Jamaicaway, Pond, Centre and Eliot Sts., Jamaica Plain, Boston, Massachusetts
- Coordinates: 42°18′33.9″N 71°6′56.8″W
- Area: 43 acres (17 ha)
- Architect: Multiple
- Architectural style: Early Republic, Bungalow/Craftsman, Late Victorian
- NRHP reference No.: 90001536
- Added to NRHP: October 11, 1990

Monument Square Historic District is a predominantly residential historic district north of Monument Square in Jamaica Plain, a neighborhood of Boston, Massachusetts. The 43 acres (17 ha) district is bounded on the northwest by Pond Street, the northeast by Myrtle and Pond Streets, the southeast by Centre Street (excluding the commercial properties on Centre Street itself), and Holbrook and Eliot Streets to the west. This area, originally developed as country estates, was developed as a residential area in the late 19th and early 20th centuries, with its architecture reflecting a diversity of styles. Prominent non-residential buildings including the First Church of Jamaica Plain, Eliot Hall, and the Eliot School. Also included in the district is Jamaica Plain's Gothic Soldier's Monument, at the junction of South and Centre Streets.

The district was added to the National Register of Historic Places on October 11, 1990.

== Gallery ==
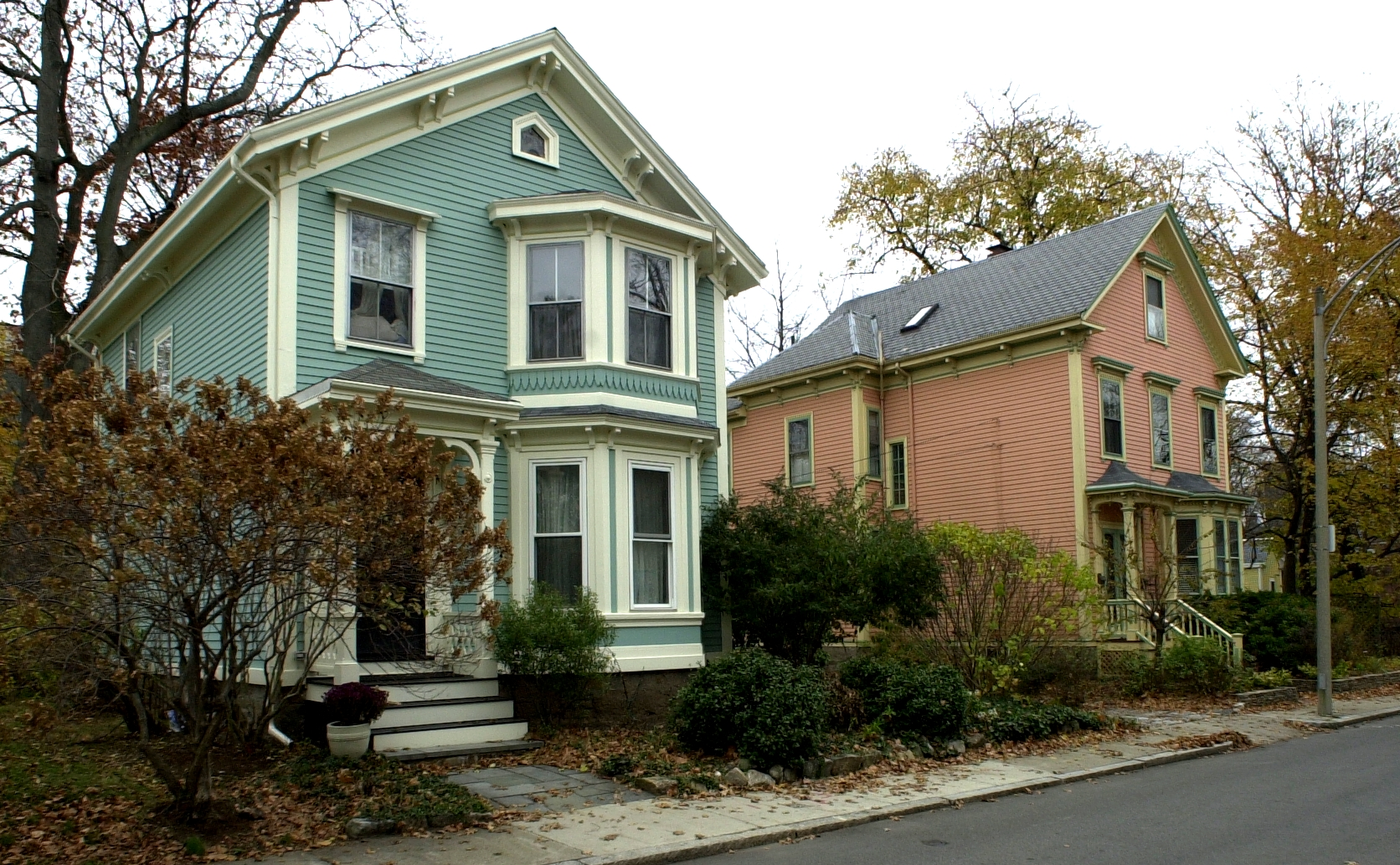
Houses on Holbrook St.

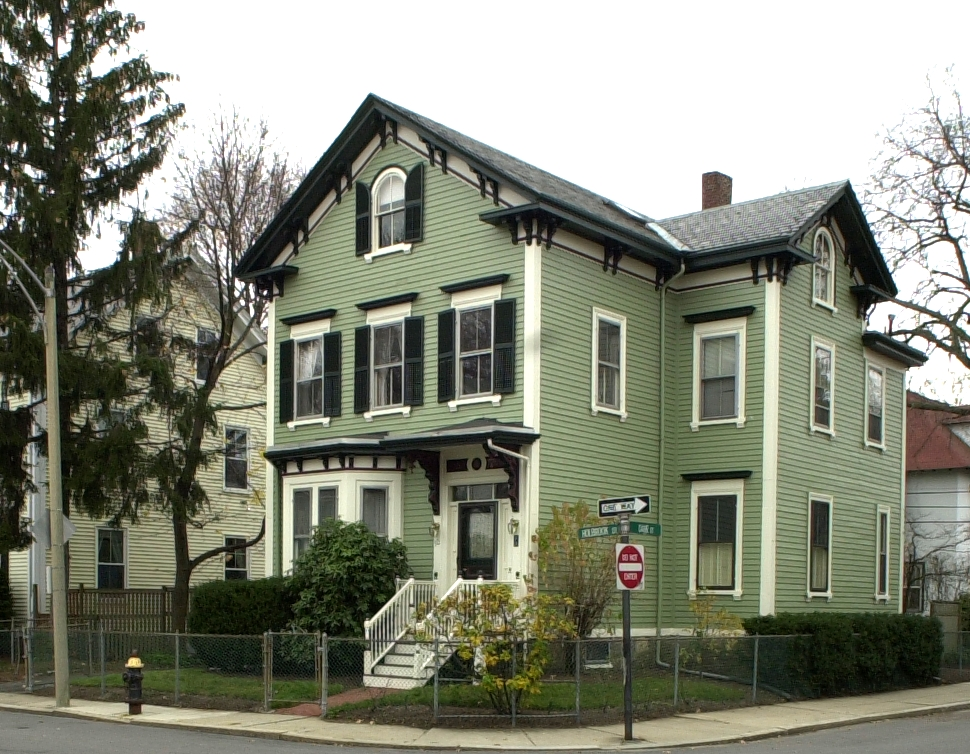
House on Holbrook St.

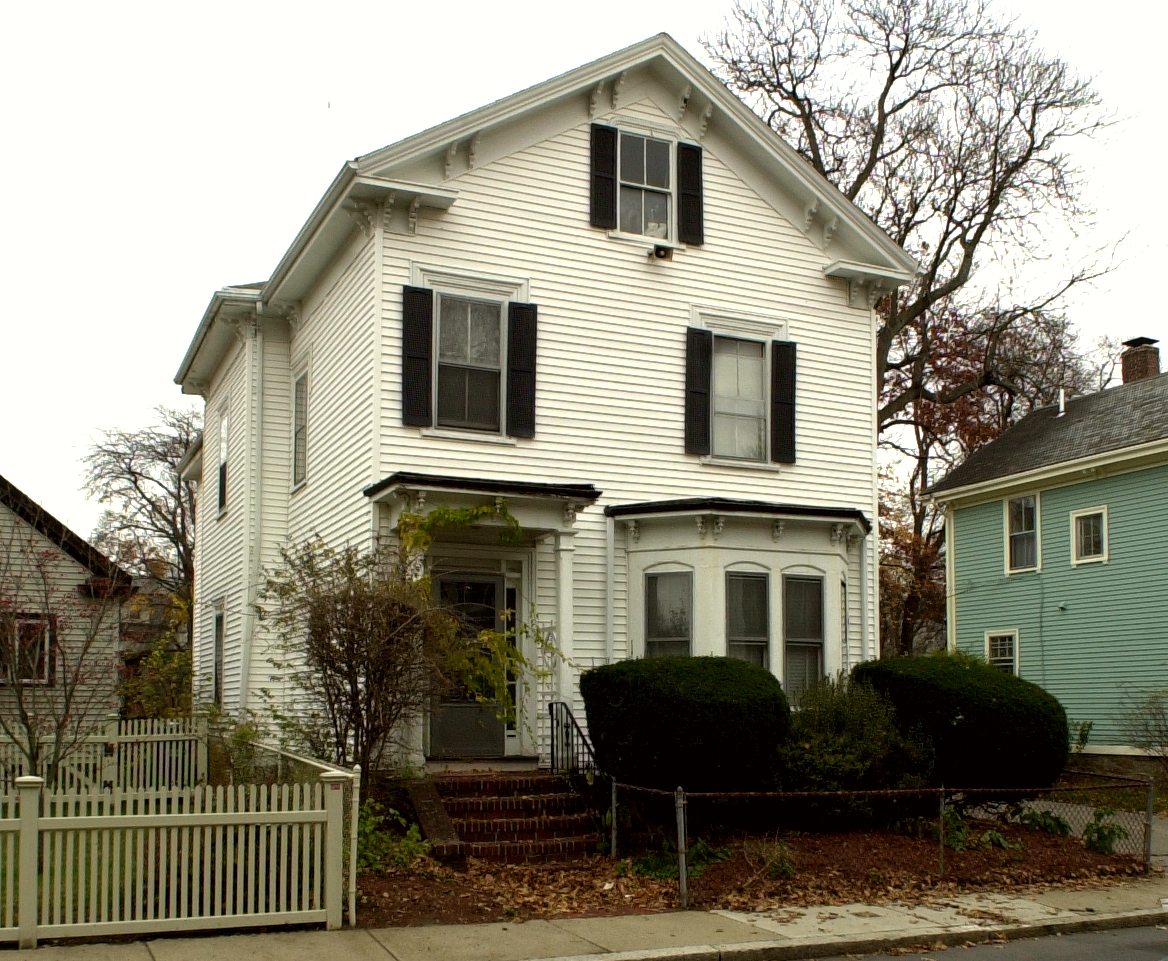
House on Holbrook St.

== See also ==
- National Register of Historic Places listings in southern Boston, Massachusetts
