= Harvard Avenue Fire Station =

- U.S. National Register of Historic Places
- U.S. Historic district – Contributing property
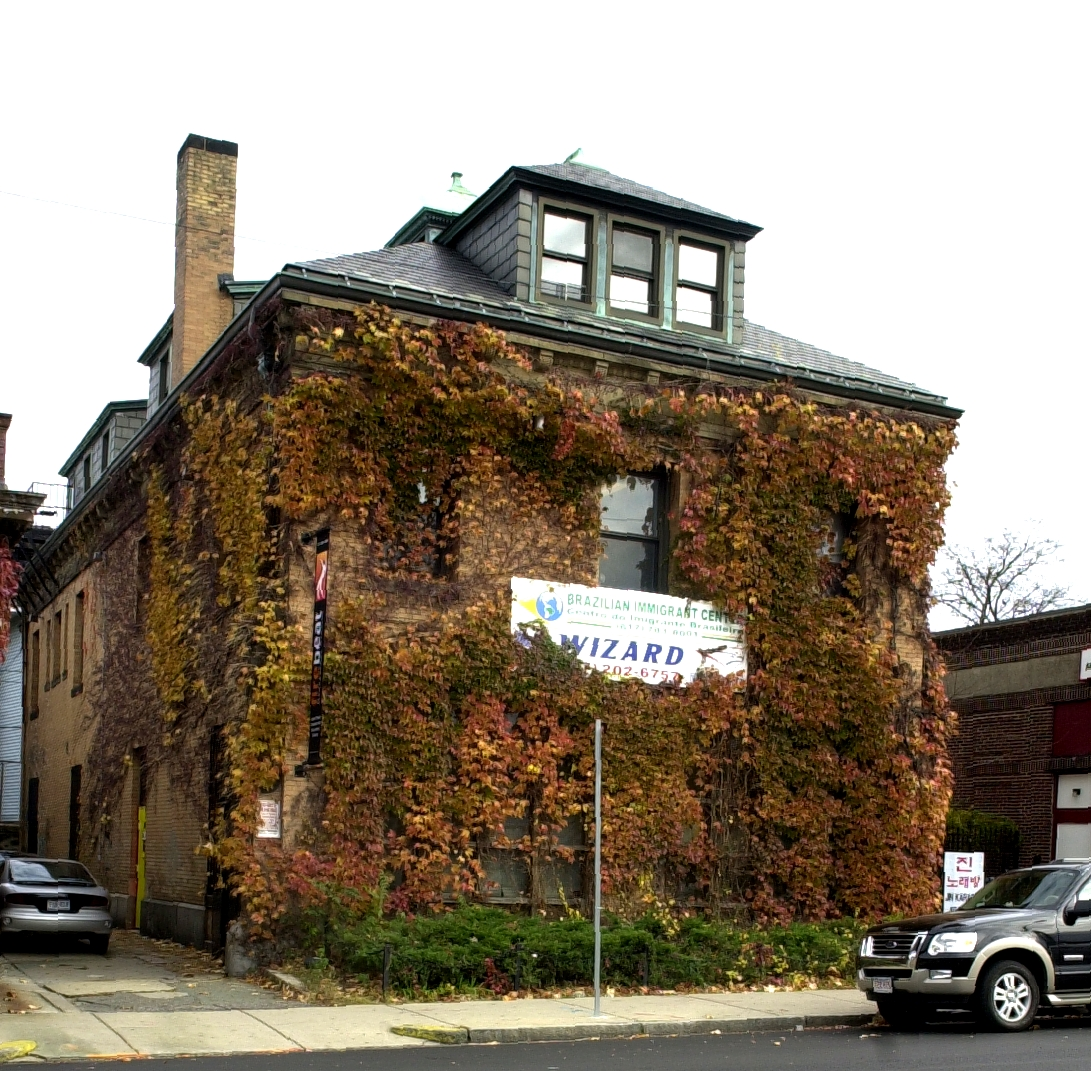
- The two walled-up engine doors are hidden behind the ivy.

- Location within Massachusetts Location within the United States
- Location: 16 Harvard Ave., Boston, Massachusetts
- Coordinates: 42°21′18.6″N 71°7′57.1″W
- Area: less than one acre
- Built: 1891
- Architect: Harrison H. Atwood
- Part of: Harvard Avenue Historic District (ID00000415)
- NRHP reference No.: 83000605

Significant dates
- Added to NRHP: March 31, 1983
- Designated CP: April 28, 2000

The Harvard Avenue Fire Station is a historic former fire station on 16 Harvard Avenue in Boston, Massachusetts. The station was designed in 1891 by Harrison H. Atwood, the Boston city architect who also designed the Congress Street Fire Station, It is a hip-roofed two story brick structure with Renaissance and Classical Revival elements. It was the second firehouse built on the site, and housed Engine #41 and Hook and Ladder #14.

The building was listed on the National Register of Historic Places in 1983.

== See also ==
- National Register of Historic Places listings in southern Boston, Massachusetts
