= Harrison H. Atwood =

American architect and politician

Harrison Henry Atwood
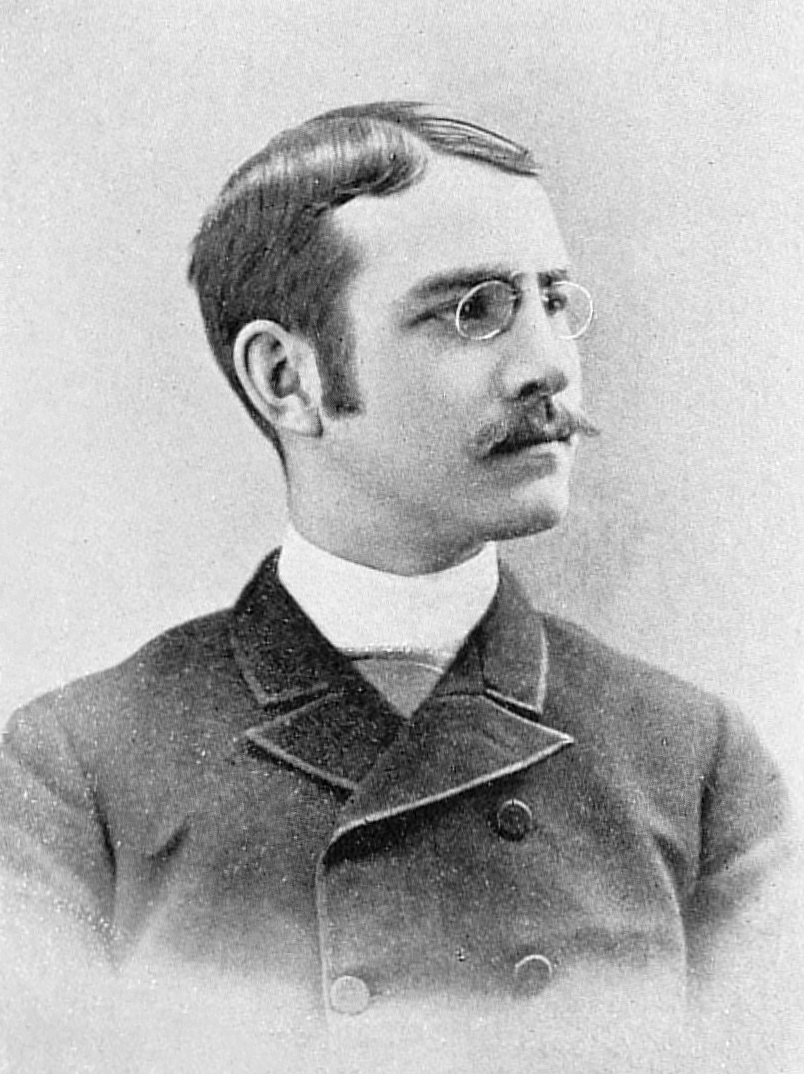
- Atwood c. 1894

Member of the U.S. House of Representatives from Massachusetts's 10th district
- In office March 4, 1895 – March 3, 1897
- Preceded by: Michael J. McEttrick
- Succeeded by: Samuel J. Barrows

Member of the Massachusetts House of Representatives
- In office 1887–1889
- Preceded by: Patrick D. Dwyer; Matthew Dolan
- Succeeded by: Joseph P. Lomasney
- Constituency: 8th Suffolk district
- In office 1915–1915
- Preceded by: Timothy J. Ahern; Sanford Bates; Charles S. Lawler
- Succeeded by: Charles S. Lawler
- Constituency: 24th Suffolk district
- In office 1917–1918
- Succeeded by: Frank L. Brier; Elihu D. Stone
- Constituency: 19th Suffolk district
- In office 1923–1924
- Preceded by: Frank L. Brier; Herbert W. Burr; Charles Shulman
- Succeeded by: Bernard P. Casey; Bernard Ginsburg
- Constituency: 19th Suffolk district
- In office 1927–1928
- Preceded by: Peter J. Fitzgerald; Joseph J. Mulhern
- Succeeded by: Frank J. McFarland
- Constituency: 17th Suffolk district

5th City Architect of Boston
- In office 1889–1891
- Preceded by: Charles J. Bateman
- Succeeded by: Edmund M. Wheelwright

Personal details
- Born: August 26, 1863 North Londonderry, Vermont, U.S.
- Died: October 22, 1954 (aged 91) Boston, Massachusetts, U.S.
- Party: Republican; Progressive
- Spouse: Clara Stein
- Children: Harrison Jr. August
- Profession: Architect

Harrison Henry Atwood (August 26, 1863 – October 22, 1954) was an American architect and politician who represented Boston in the United States House of Representatives from 1895 to 1897 and for several nonconsecutive terms in the Massachusetts House of Representatives. He was a member of the Republican Party but was also supported by the Progressive Party during his later terms in the Massachusetts House.

== Biography ==
Born at the home of his grandmother in North Londonderry, Vermont, Atwood attended public schools in Boston. He studied architecture and engaged in that profession in Boston. Atwood was elected as a Republican to the Fifty-fourth Congress (March 4, 1895 – March 3, 1897). Atwood defeated incumbent Democrat Michael J. McEttrick. He was a member of the Republican State Committee.

Atwood was an unsuccessful candidate for renomination in 1896 to the Fifty-fifth Congress. He resumed his former profession in Boston. From 1888 to 1894 he was a member of and secretary to the Boston Republican City Committee. From 1889 to 1890 he was City Architect of Boston, designing the Bowditch School, the Congress Street Fire Station, and the Harvard Avenue Fire Station, all on the National Register of Historic Places. Atwood also designed several churches for the Roman Catholic Archdiocese of Boston. He was again a member of the Massachusetts House of Representatives in 1915, 1917, 1918, 1923, 1924, 1927, and 1928.

He was an unsuccessful candidate for election in 1918 to the Sixty-sixth Congress, and then resumed his work as an architect in Boston. In April 1938, he moved to Wellesley Hills, Massachusetts.

== Death ==
Atwood died in Boston on October 22, 1954, and was interred in Forest Hills Cemetery in the Forest Hills neighborhood of Boston.

== Buildings on the National Register of Historic Places designed by H.H. Atwood ==
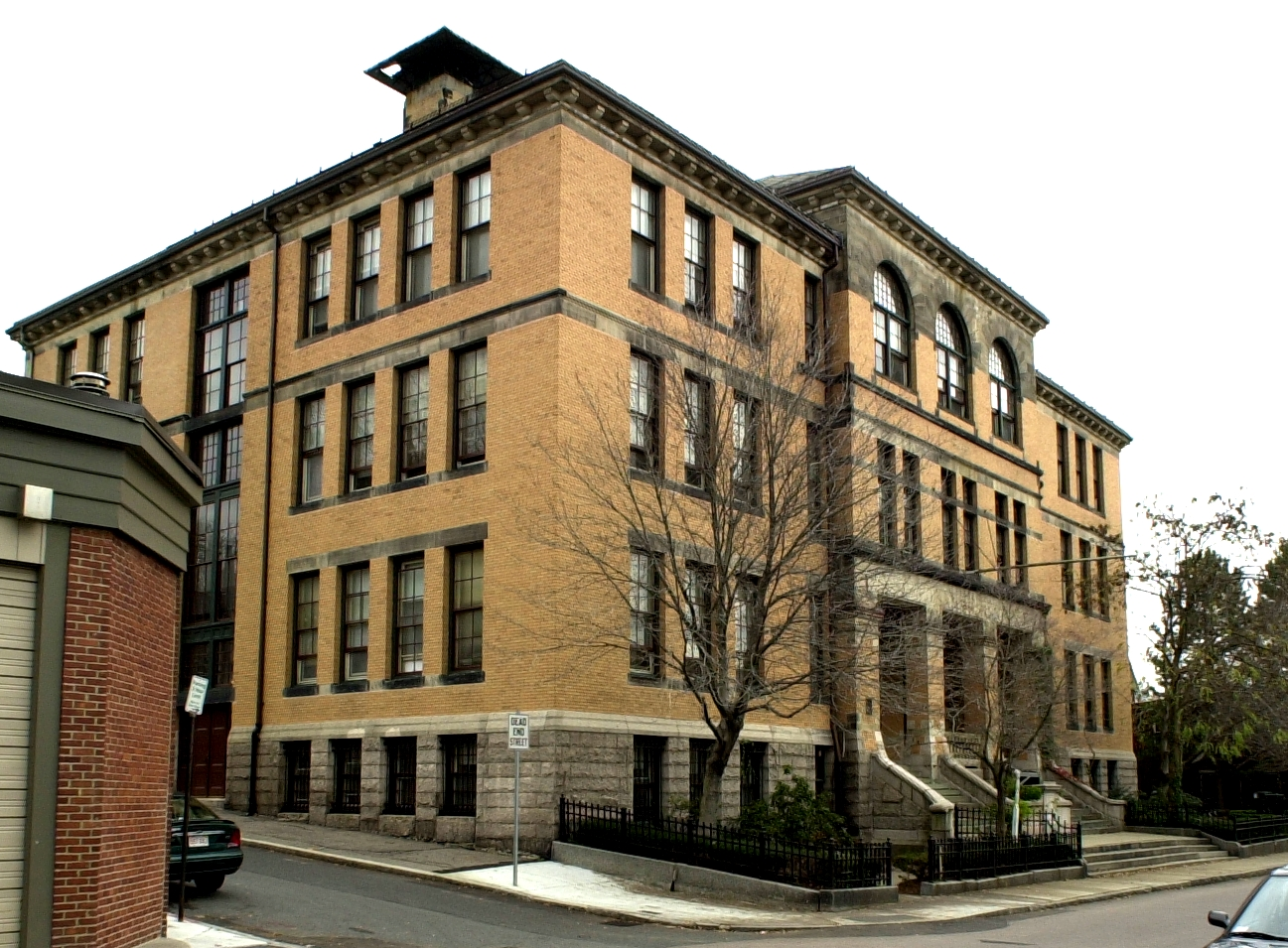
Bowditch School

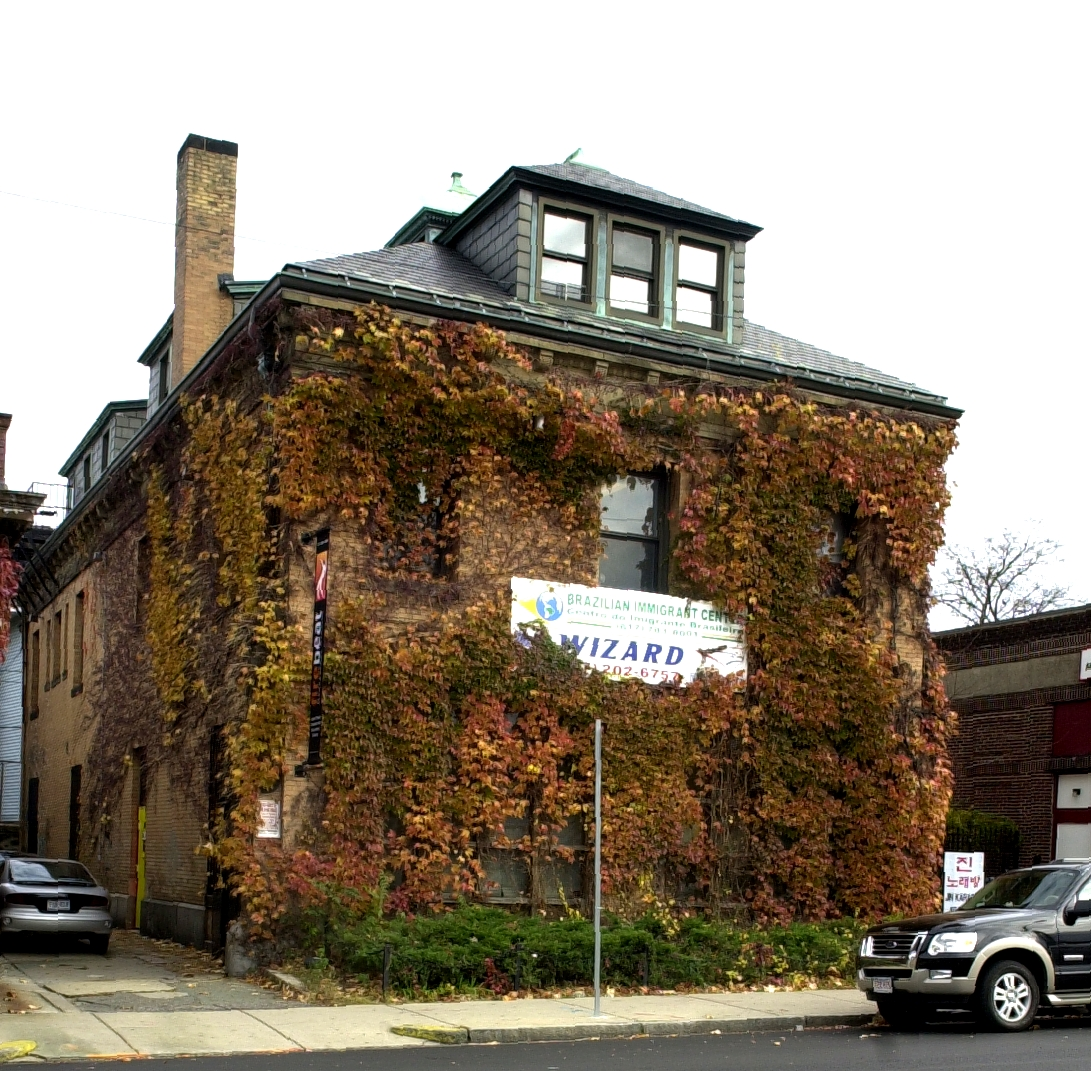
Harvard Avenue Fire Station

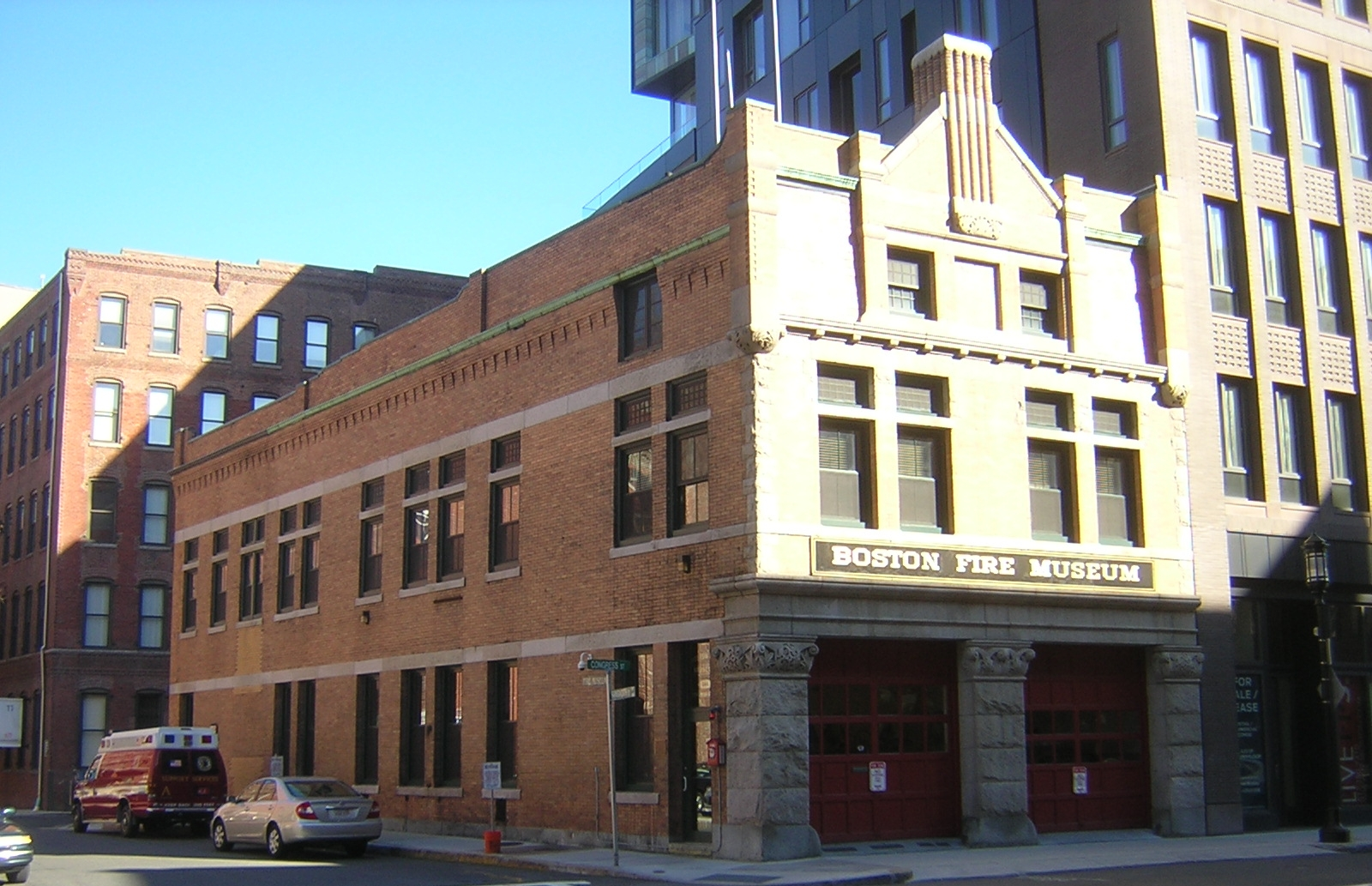
Congress Street Fire Station

== See also ==
- 1915 Massachusetts legislature
- 1917 Massachusetts legislature
- 1918 Massachusetts legislature
- 1923–1924 Massachusetts legislature

== Bibliography ==
- United States Congress. "Harrison H. Atwood (id: A000336)". Biographical Directory of the United States Congress.
- Official Congressional Directory By United States Congress

U.S. House of Representatives
Preceded by Michael J. McEttrick	Member of the U.S. House of Representatives from Massachusetts's 10th congressional district March 4, 1895 – March 3, 1897	Succeeded by Samuel J. Barrows
