= Michael J. McEttrick =

American politician

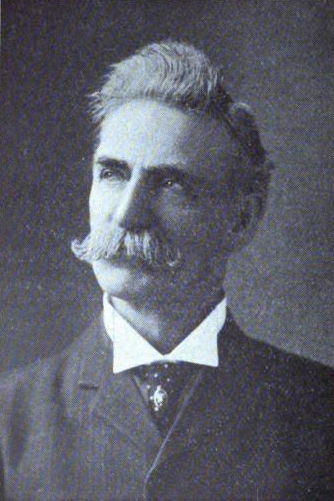
- McEttrick as State Senator c. 1908

Member of the U.S. House of Representatives from Massachusetts's 10th district
- In office March 4, 1893 – March 3, 1895
- Preceded by: Joseph H. Walker
- Succeeded by: Harrison Henry Atwood

Member of the Massachusetts State Senate
- In office January 1, 1892 – December 31, 1892
- In office January 1, 1908 – December 31, 1908
- Succeeded by: James H. Doyle
- Constituency: 4th Suffolk

Member of the Massachusetts House of Representatives
- In office 1885–1891
- In office 1906–1907
- In office 1913–1913

Personal details
- Born: June 22, 1848 Roxbury, Boston, Massachusetts, U.S.
- Died: December 31, 1921 (aged 73) Boston, Massachusetts, U.S.
- Party: Democratic
- Education: Roxbury Latin School
- Profession: Civil engineer

Michael Joseph McEttrick (June 22, 1848 – December 31, 1921) was a U.S. representative from Massachusetts.

McEttrick was born in Roxbury, Massachusetts, he graduated from the Washington Grammar and the Roxbury Latin Schools.

He became a journalist. He served as assistant assessor of Boston in 1884. He served as a member of the Massachusetts House of Representatives 1885-1891 and chairman of the Democratic members of the house. He served in the Massachusetts State Senate in 1892.

Mcettrick was elected as an Independent Democrat to the Fifty-third Congress (March 4, 1893 – March 3, 1895). He was an unsuccessful candidate for renomination in 1894 to the Fifty-fourth Congress.

== Congressional career ==
=== 1892 and 1894 ===
In 1892 and 1894 McEttrick ran for Congress as an independent Democratic for Congress in Massachusetts 10th Congressional District.

He won in 1892 and lost in 1894.

=== 1892 ===
McEttrick won the 1892 election defeating Republican Harrison H. Atwood in a four way race.

=== 1894 ===
McEttrick lost the 1894 election to Republican Harrison H. Atwood.

== Return to State office ==
=== Massachusetts House of Representatives ===
McEttrick was again a member of the State house of representatives in 1906, 1907, and 1913.

=== Massachusetts Senate ===
McEttrick served in the State Senate in 1908 representing the Fourth Suffolk District.

== Later years ==
McEttrick engaged in the real estate business in Boston, Massachusetts, until his death there on December 31, 1921. McEttrick was interred in Calvary Cemetery.

== Bibliography ==
- United States Congress. "Michael J. McEttrick (id: M000430)". Biographical Directory of the United States Congress.

U.S. House of Representatives
Preceded by Joseph H. Walker	Member of the U.S. House of Representatives from Massachusetts's 10th congressional district March 4, 1893 – March 3, 1895	Succeeded by Harrison H. Atwood
