= Fort Point Channel Historic District =

Historic district in Massachusetts, United States

- U.S. National Register of Historic Places
- U.S. Historic district
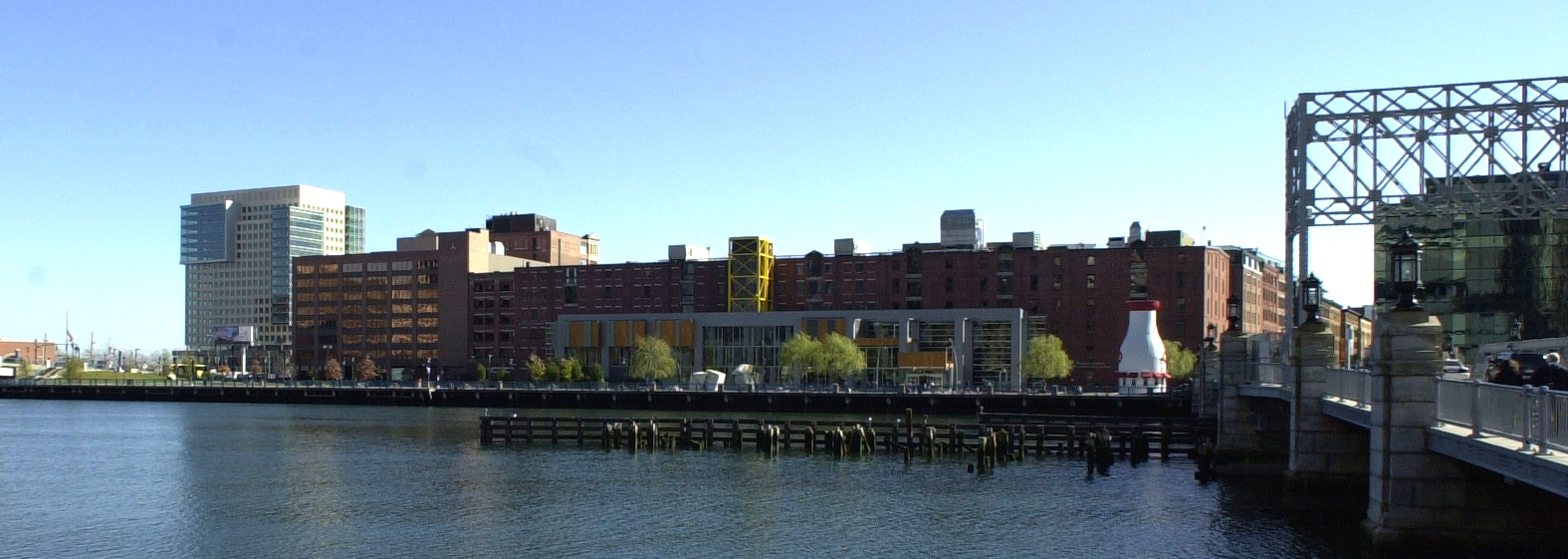

- Location within Boston Location within Massachusetts Location within the United States
- Location: Necco Court, Thomson Place, A, Binford, Congress, Farnsworth, Melcher, Midway, Sleeper, Stillings, Summer Sts., Boston, Massachusetts
- Coordinates: 42°21′4″N 71°3′2″W
- Area: 55 acres (22 ha)
- Built: 1836
- Architect: Safford, Morton; et al.
- Architectural style: Italianate, Romanesque
- NRHP reference No.: 04000959
- Added to NRHP: September 10, 2004

The Fort Point Channel Historic District is an historic district located along Congress, Summer and A streets in South Boston on the south side of Fort Point Channel.

The district includes the Boston Children's Museum (pictured, right), located in a renovated 19th-century brick industrial building, and the Boston Fire Museum, housed in the 1891 Congress Street Fire Station.

== History ==
Consisting of about 55 acres (22 ha) of land across the Fort Point Channel from Boston's Financial District, the area was developed by the Boston Wharf Company from 1836 to 1882, mainly for warehousing and manufacturing. The Boston Wharf Company parceled out all of the lots and laid out all of the streets from scratch, naming the streets after officers in the company and principal tenants in the buildings: Binford, Farnsworth, Melcher, Midway, Sleeper and Stillings streets, Necco Court, Thomson Place.

The Boston Wharf Company constructed most of the buildings for the manufacture and storage of a wide variety of goods, beginning with sugar and molasses and branching out into the wool trade by the end of the 19th century.

Concurrently, the company enlarged its operations to become a chief developer of warehouse and industrial facilities for local railroads and shipping companies. This district made Boston the main production and marketing center for wool for clothing and fabrics during the late 19th and early 20th centuries.

After the wool trade declined, the district's buildings were abandoned. Artists gradually moved into the large, well-lit warehouse loft spaces, thus creating New England's largest enclave of artists, the Fort Point Arts Community.

== Architecture ==
The Fort Point Channel district mainly consists of a visually uniform collection of side-by-side loft buildings constructed between the 1880s and 1920s by the Boston Wharf Company, most bearing the company's trademark logo as a circular copper crest relief attached to each building.

According to the Boston Landmarks Commission, these buildings represent "an unusually coherent and well-preserved collection of late 19th and early 20th century lofts that reflect a critical period of social, economic, and physical development in the City and the region. The loft buildings are generally masonry, with simple volumes and flat roofs. Buildings are elegantly proportioned, with classically inspired details concentrated at entrances and cornices."

== Landmark designation ==
The Fort Point Channel Historic District was added to the National Register of Historic Places in 2004.

In 2001, the Fort Point District was petitioned as a Landmark District with the Boston Landmarks Commission. In 2008, a Mayoral-appointed Study Committee began drafting District guidelines. In December 2008, Mayor Menino and the Boston Landmarks Commission voted in favor of the guidelines which were officially approved on January 28, 2009 by the Boston City Council.

== See also ==
- National Register of Historic Places listings in northern Boston, Massachusetts
