= Bowditch School =

- U.S. National Register of Historic Places
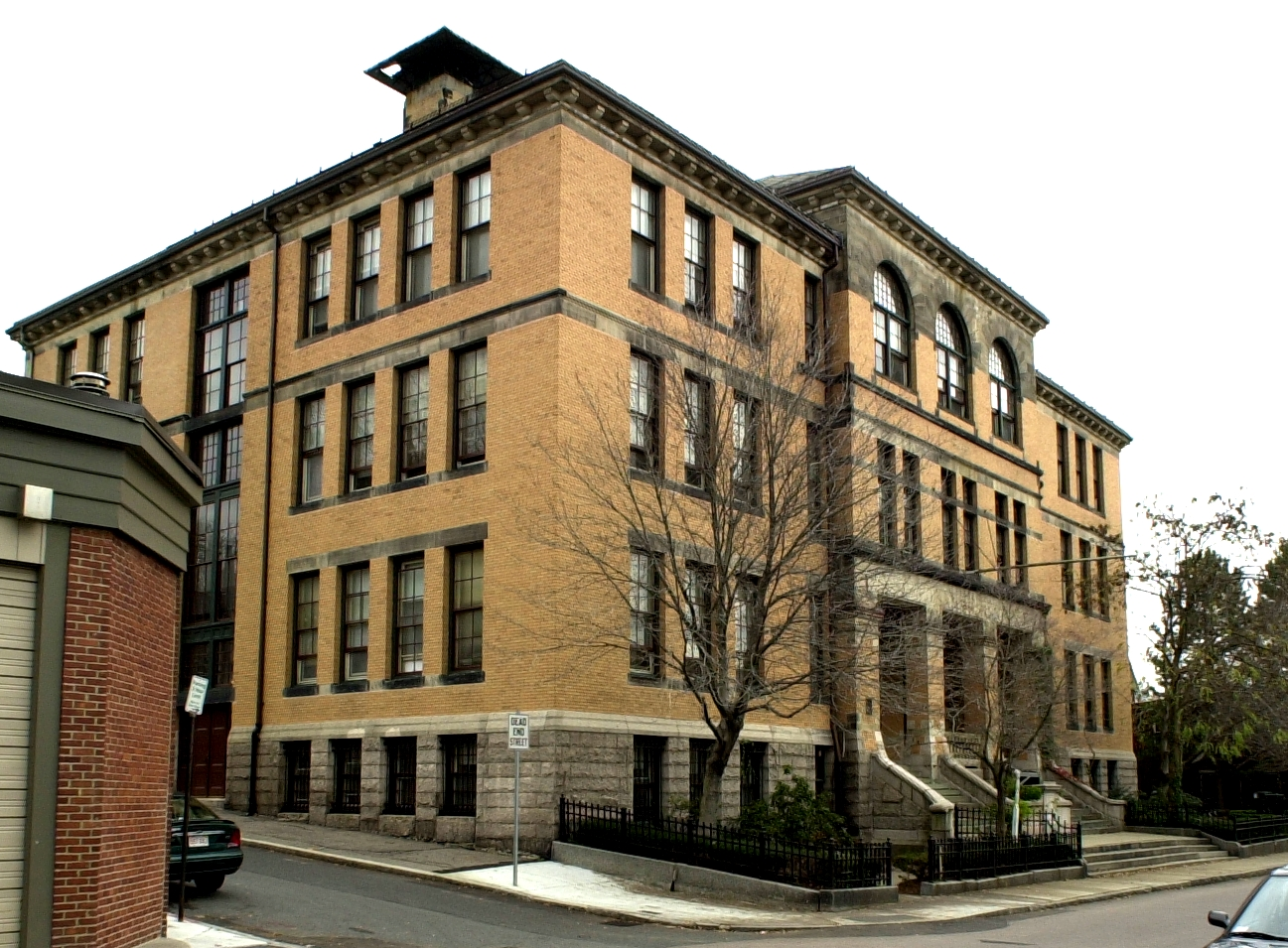

- Location within Massachusetts Location within the United States
- Location: 80-82 Green St., Boston, Massachusetts
- Coordinates: 42°18′42.2″N 71°6′34.2″W
- Area: less than one acre
- Built: 1892
- Architect: Harrison H. Atwood
- Architectural style: Classical Revival
- NRHP reference No.: 90001145
- Added to NRHP: August 3, 1990

The Bowditch School is an historic school building at 80–82 Green Street in the Jamaica Plain neighborhood of Boston, Massachusetts. The three-story brick-and-granite Classical Revival building was designed by Harrison Henry Atwood, a prominent local architect, and was built in 1892. Its main facade has a projecting three-part pavilion, with square entry openings at the base, and round-arch windows at the top level, with a modillioned cornice. It is named for Nathaniel Bowditch, a noted early 19th-century astronomer and mathematician.

By 1981 Boston Public Schools stopped using the facility, and the city government deemed it excess to the city's needs in July of that year.

The building was listed on the National Register of Historic Places in 1990.

== Gallery ==
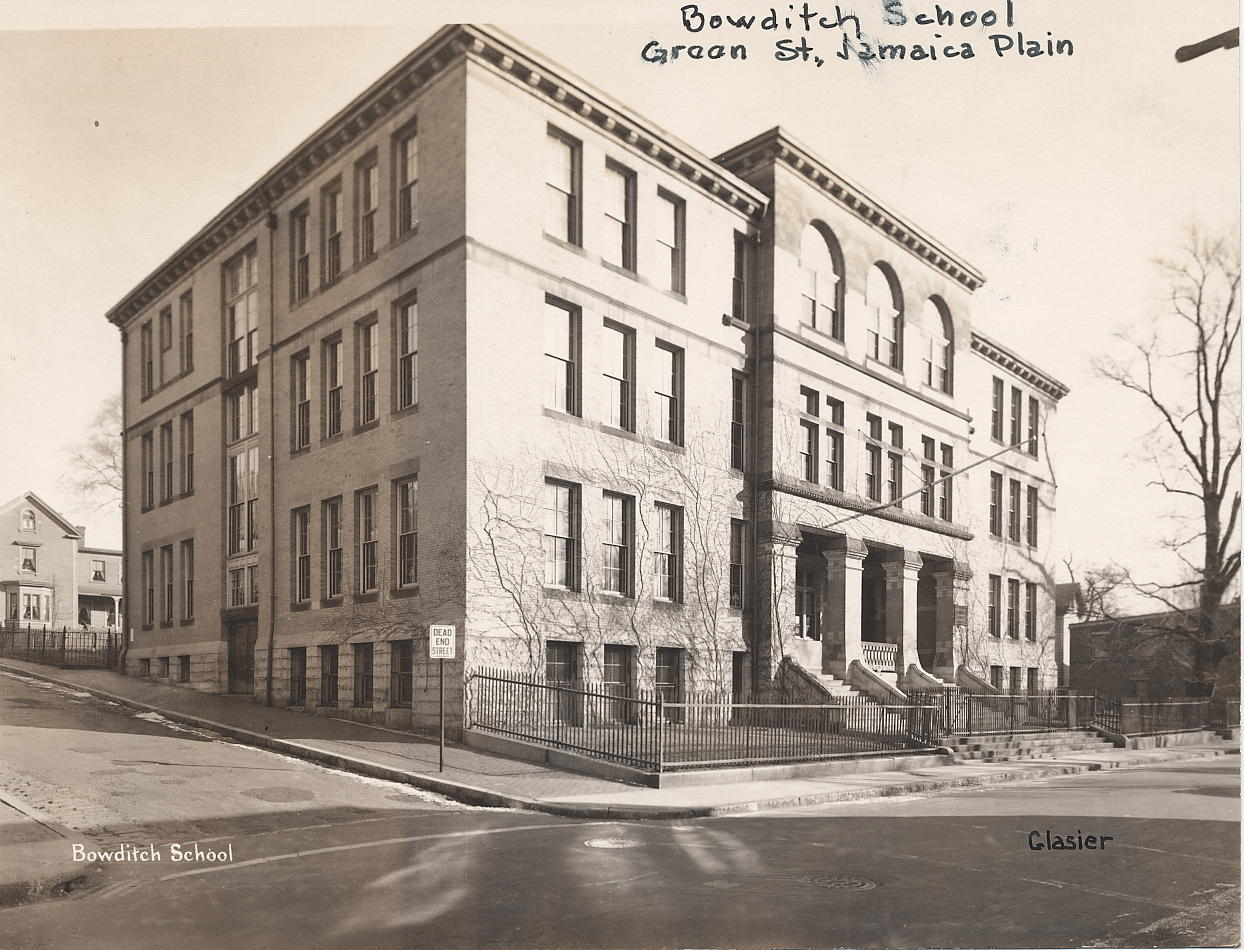
in 1920s-30s

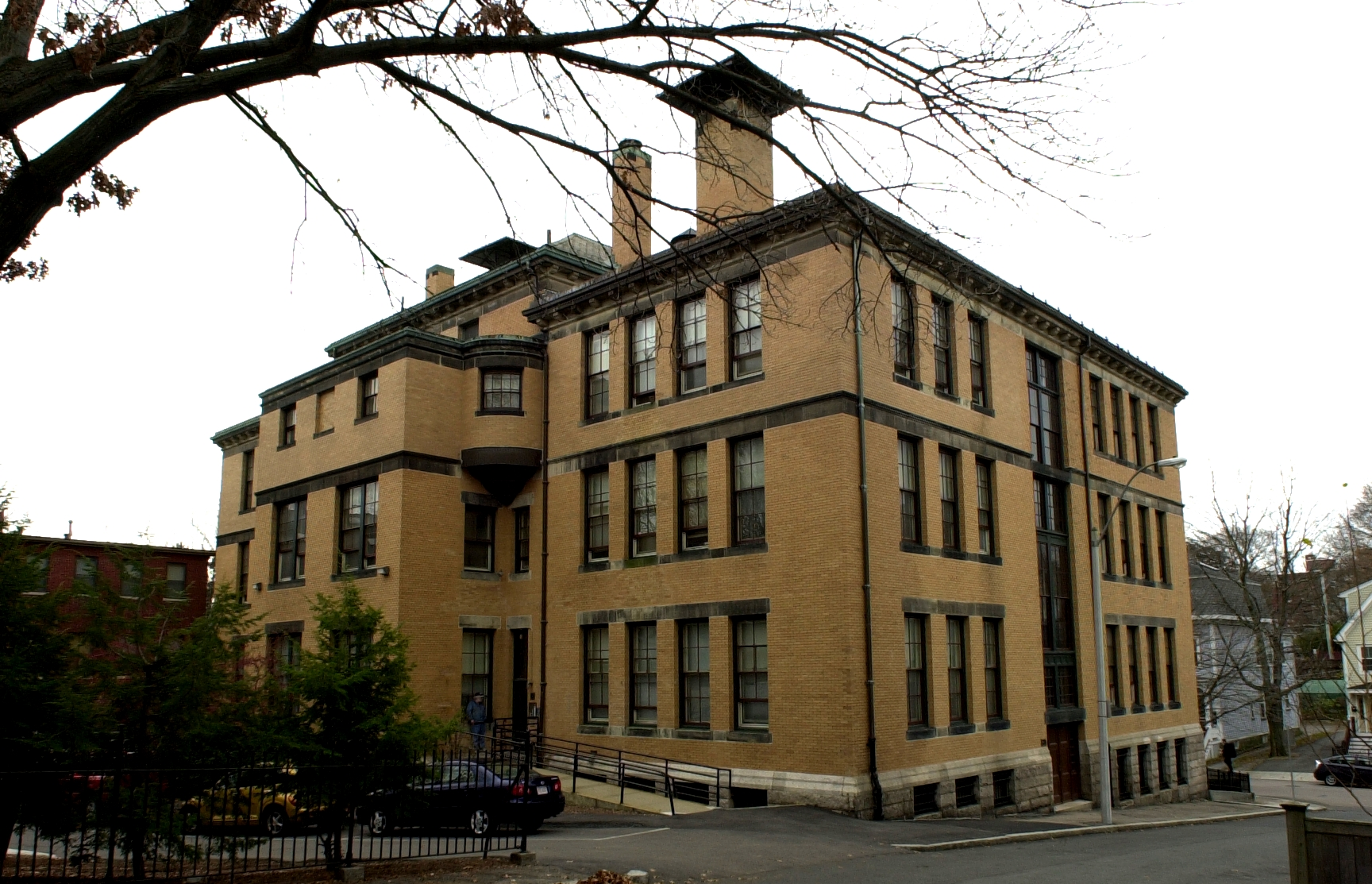

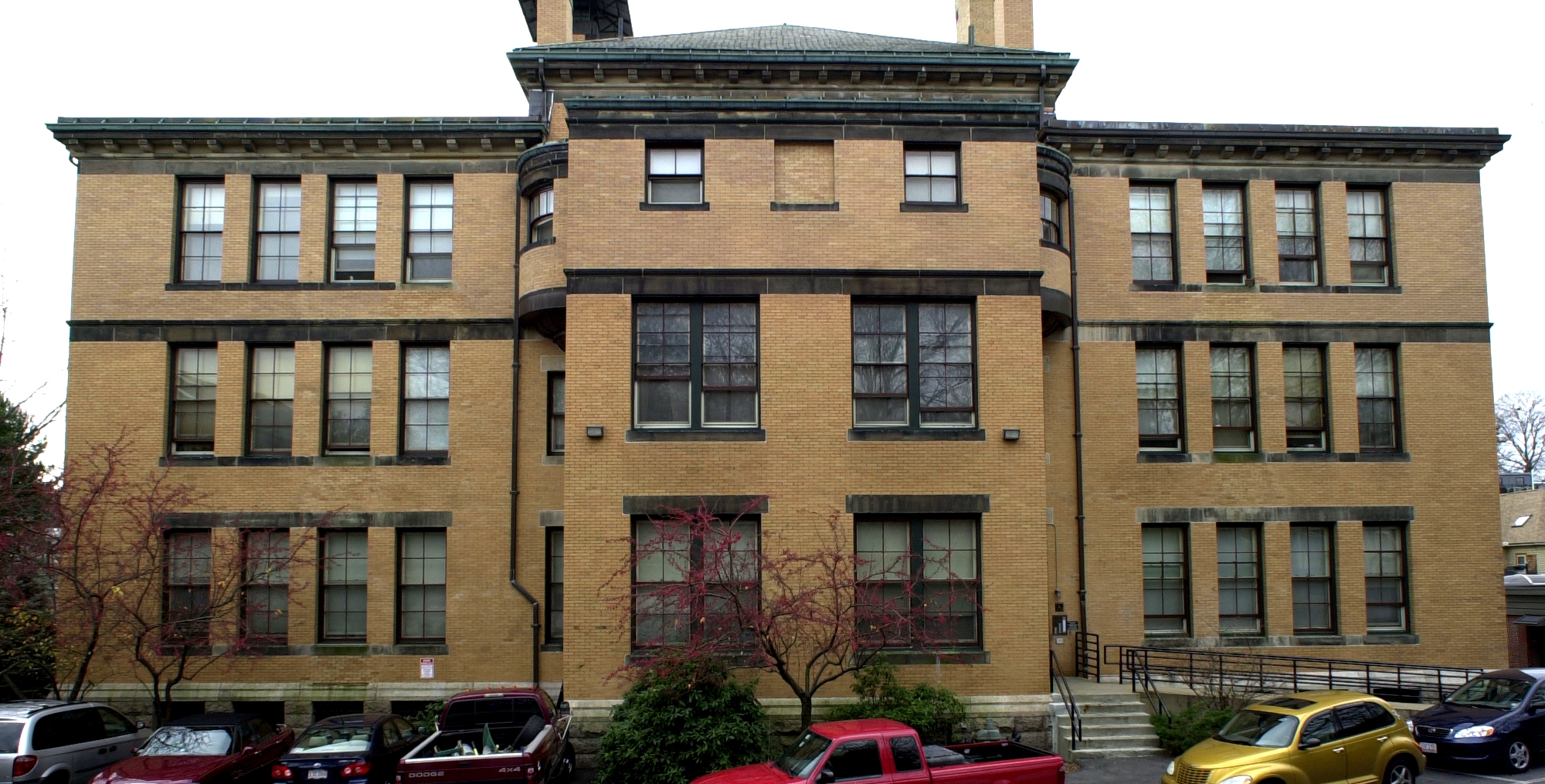

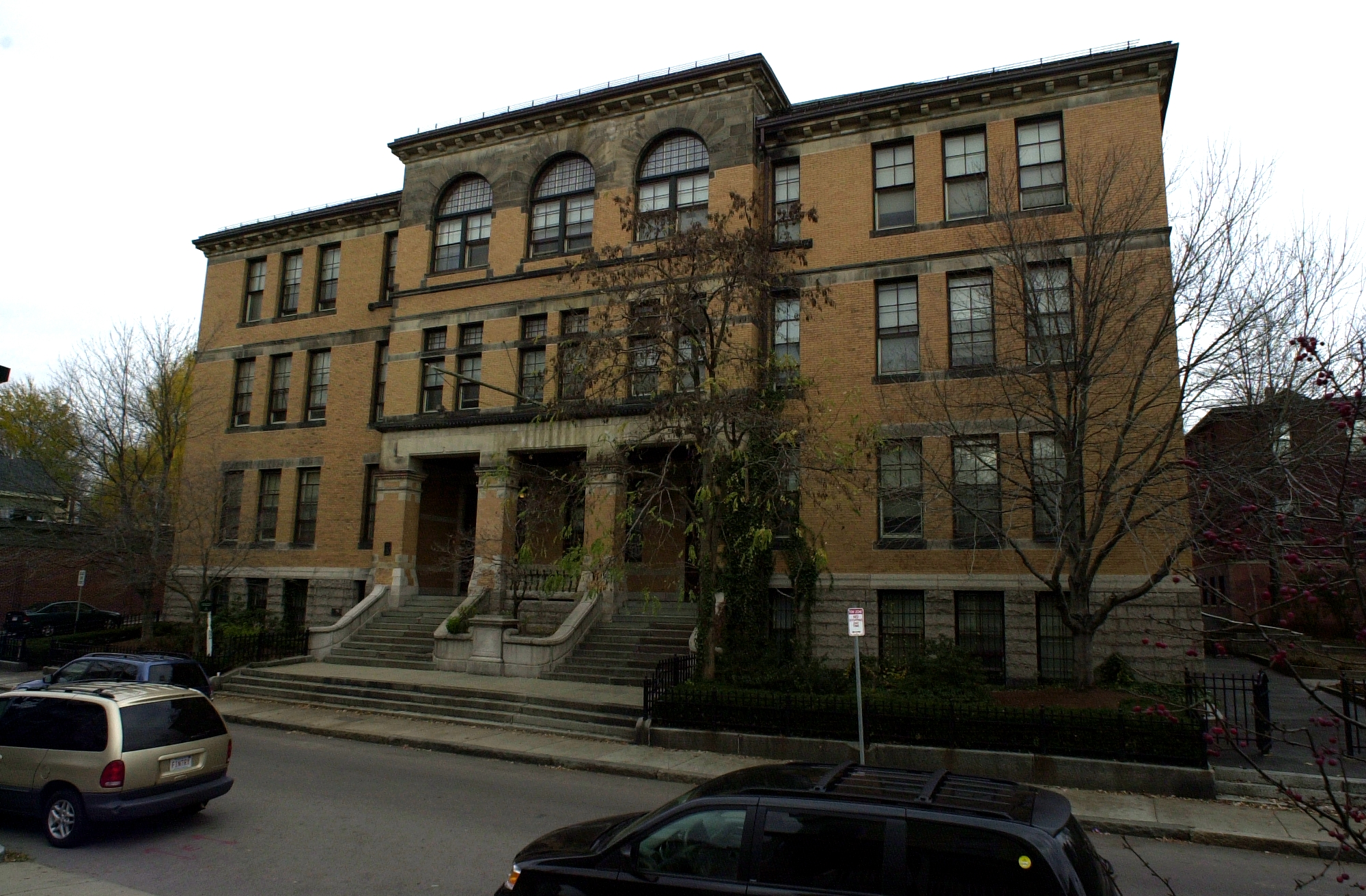

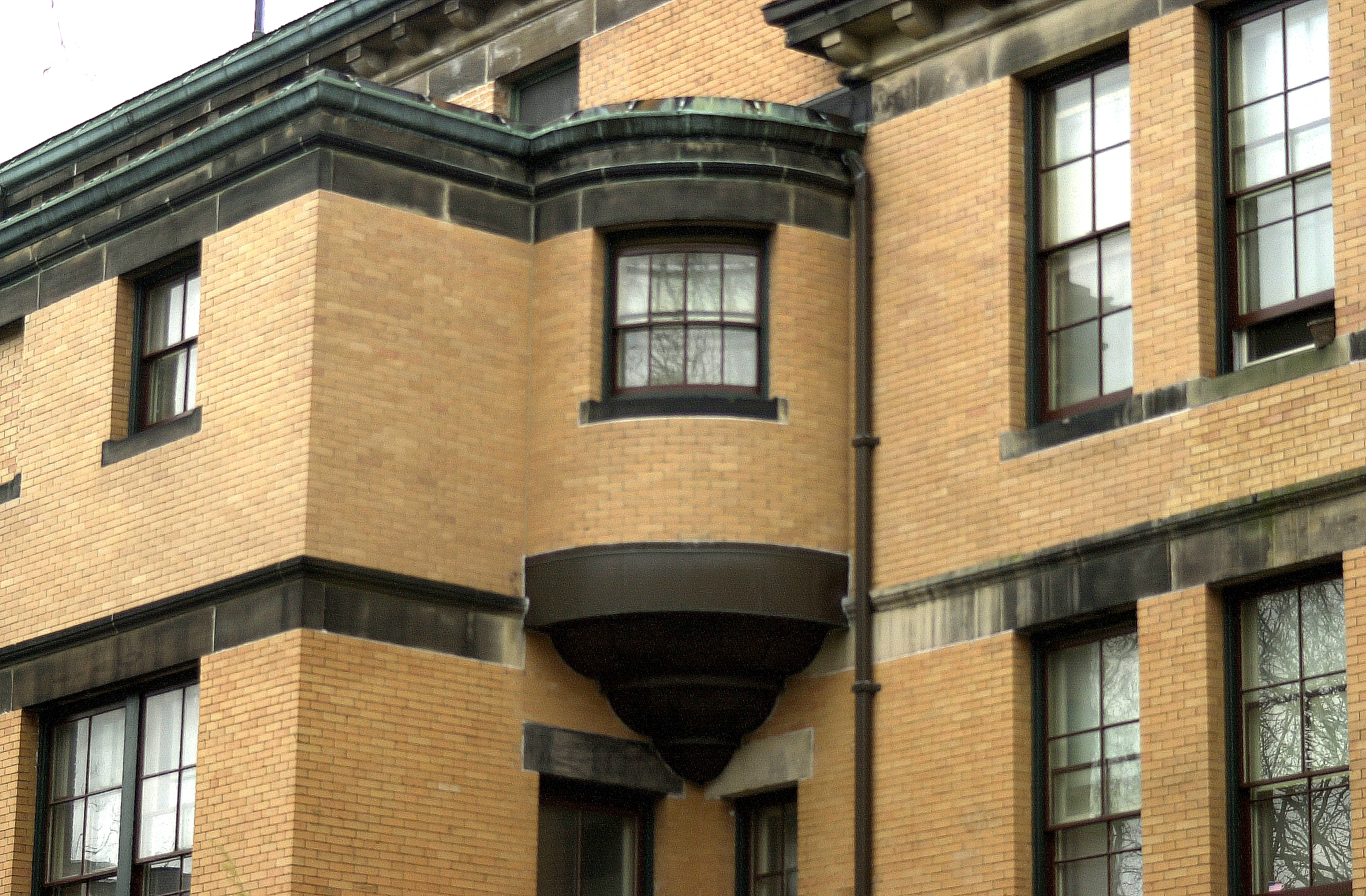

== See also ==
- National Register of Historic Places listings in southern Boston, Massachusetts
