= Harvard Avenue Historic District =

Historic district in Massachusetts, United States

- U.S. National Register of Historic Places
- U.S. Historic district
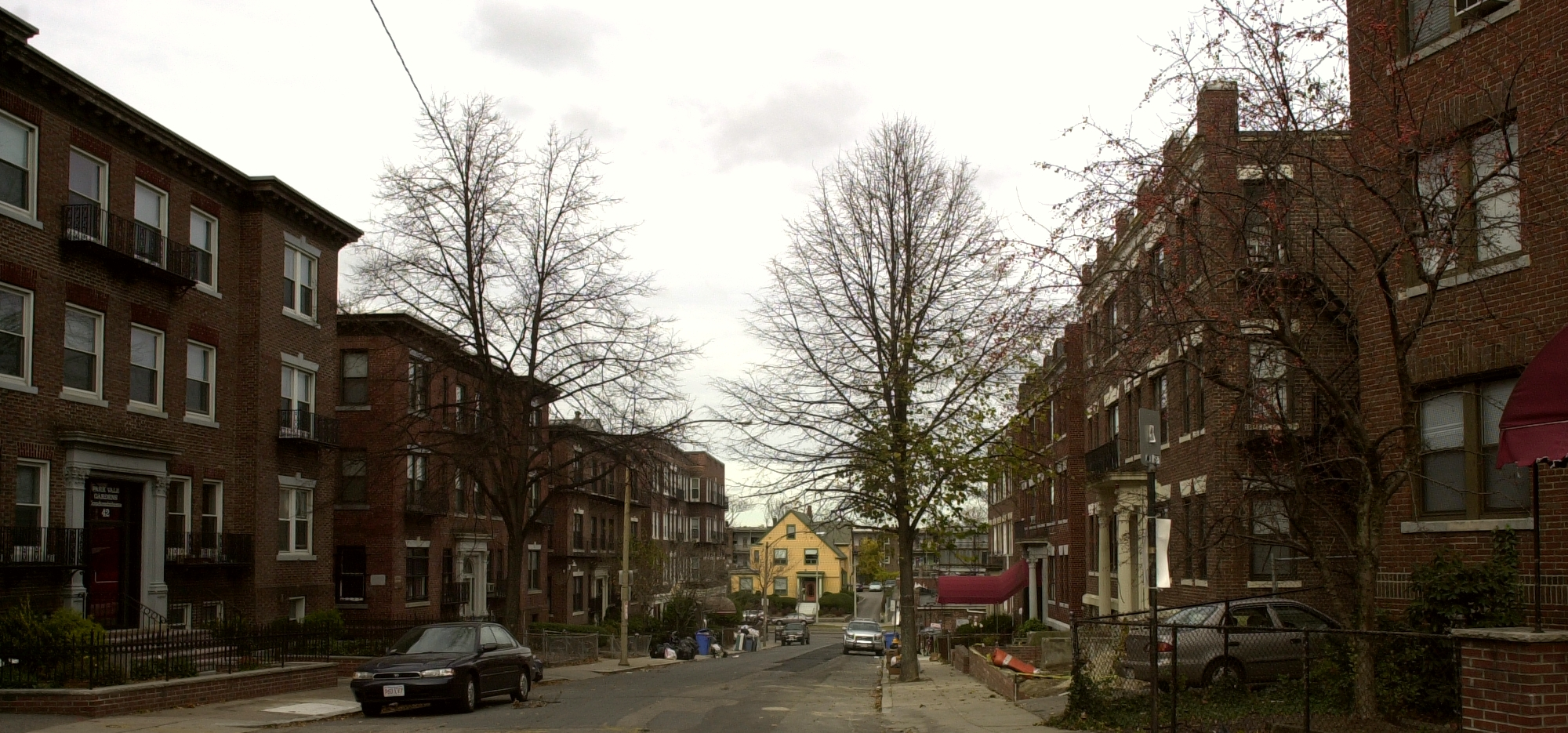

- Location within Massachusetts Location within the United States
- Location: Roughly bounded by Linden St., Commonwealth AVe., Harvard Ave., and Park Vale Ave., Boston, Massachusetts
- Coordinates: 42°21′12″N 71°7′58″W
- Area: 23 acres (9.3 ha)
- Built: 1867
- Architect: Shepley, Rutan and Coolidge et al.
- Architectural style: Late Victorian, Late 19th And 20th Century Revivals, et al.
- NRHP reference No.: 00000415
- Added to NRHP: April 28, 2000

The Harvard Avenue Historic District is a historic district roughly bounded by Linden Street, Commonwealth Avenue, Harvard Avenue, and Park Vale Avenue in the Allston neighborhood of Boston, Massachusetts. Its spine is Harvard Avenue, a major north–south thoroughfare connecting Allston to points north (generally via Cambridge Street toward Cambridge), and south toward Brookline. The area underwent a population explosion in the early 20th century, and Harvard Avenue was developed roughly between 1905 and 1925 as a commercial and residential spine. Notable buildings in the district include the Allston Station building, designed by Shepley, Rutan and Coolidge, and the Harvard Avenue Fire Station.

The district was listed on the National Register of Historic Places in 2000.

== See also ==
- National Register of Historic Places listings in southern Boston, Massachusetts
