= Congress Street Fire Station =

- U.S. National Register of Historic Places
- U.S. Historic district – Contributing property
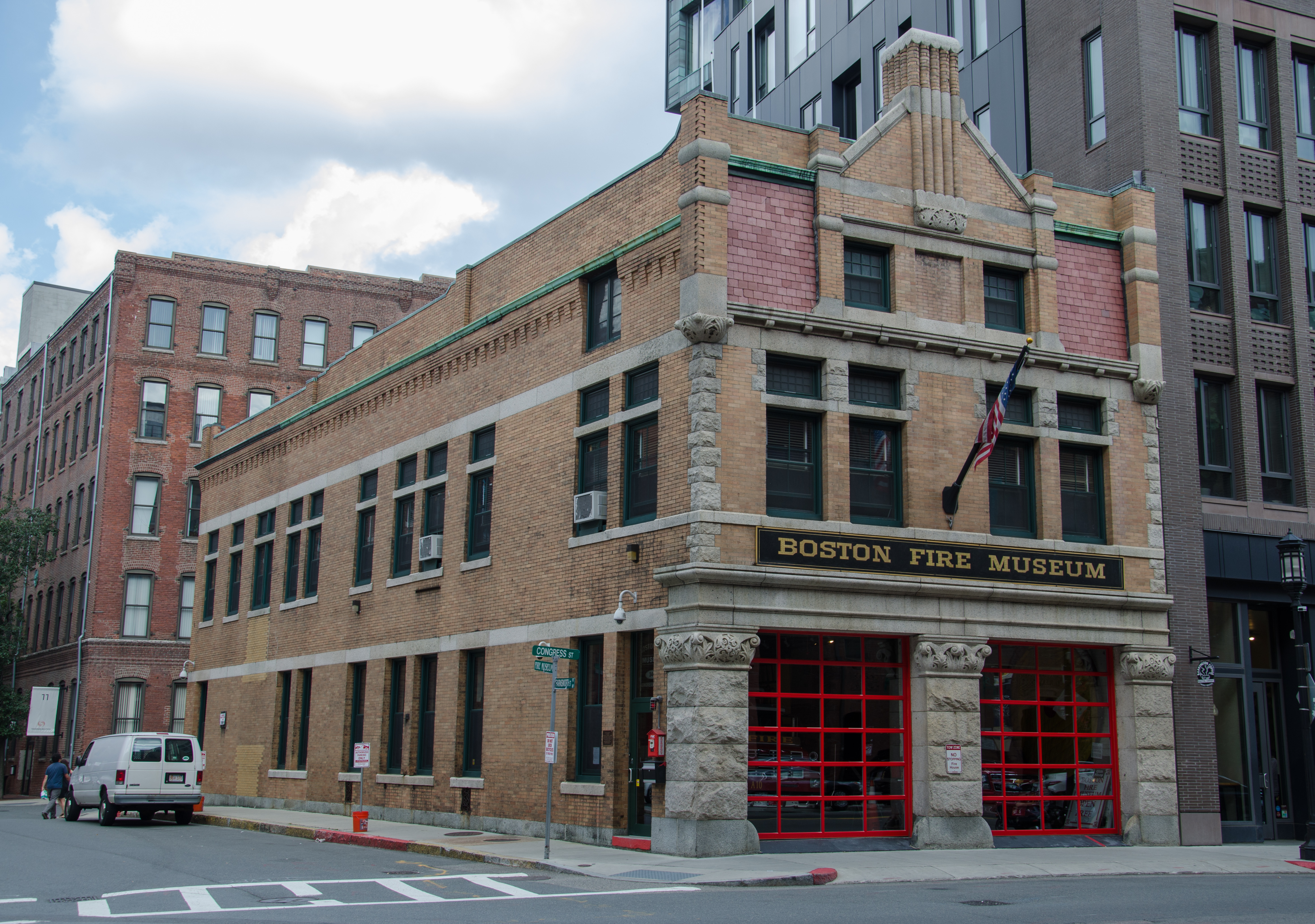

- Location within Boston Location within Massachusetts Location within the United States
- Location: 344 Congress St., Boston, Massachusetts
- Coordinates: 42°21′02.7″N 71°02′56.2″W
- Area: less than one acre
- Built: 1891
- Architect: Harrison H. Atwood
- Architectural style: Romanesque, Panel Brick
- Part of: Fort Point Channel Historic District (ID04000959)
- NRHP reference No.: 87001396

Significant dates
- Added to NRHP: September 03, 1987
- Designated CP: September 10, 2004

The Congress Street Fire Station, now known as the Boston Fire Museum, is an historic fire station at 344 Congress Street in Boston, Massachusetts.

The Romanesque style station was designed by Harrison H. Atwood, then the city architect, and constructed in 1891. It is distinctive for its early use, within this style, of light-colored brick, and features a rusticated ground level and progressively more refined detailing as it rises.

The building was added to the National Register of Historic Places in 1987, and was included in the Fort Point Channel Historic District in 2004. It now serves as the Boston Fire Museum.

== See also ==
- National Register of Historic Places listings in northern Boston, Massachusetts
