= List of University of Chicago faculty =

This list of University of Chicago faculty contains administrators, long-term faculty members, and temporary academic staffs of the University of Chicago. The long-term faculty members consists of tenure/tenure-track and equivalent academic positions, while that of temporary academic staffs consists of lecturers (without tenure), postdoctoral researchers, visiting professors or scholars (visitors), and equivalent academic positions. Summer visitors are also generally excluded from the list (unless summer work yielded significant end products) since summer terms are not part of formal academic years; the same rule applies to the Graham School of Continuing Liberal and Professional Studies, the extension school of the university.

== Graduate Library School (1928–1989) ==
- Lester Asheim
- Lee Pierce Butler
- Leon Carnovsky
- Herman H. Fussler
- Frances E. Henne
- Carleton B. Joeckel
- Jesse Shera
- Peggy Sullivan
- Don R. Swanson
- Douglas Waples
- Louis Round Wilson
- Victor Yngve

This school, established with funding from the Carnegie Foundation, so important to the development of U.S. librarianship in the 20th century, was closed in 1989. For details, see University of Chicago Graduate Library School.

== Literature ==
- Frederick A. de Armas – Andrew W. Mellon Professor in Humanities and professor of Spanish and comparative literature; chair of the Department of Romance Languages and Literatures
- Saul Bellow (X. 1939) – former Raymond W. and Martha Hilpert Gruner Distinguished Service Professor in the Committee on Social Thought and English; winner of the Pulitzer Prize and the Nobel Prize in Literature
- Lauren Berlant – George M. Pullman Professor of English
- David Bevington – editor, scholar of the work of William Shakespeare
- Homi K. Bhabha – former professor of English
- Allan Bloom – author of The Closing of the American Mind; former professor in the Committee on Social Thought
- Wayne C. Booth – George M. Pullman Distinguished Service Professor Emeritus
- Kenneth Burke – philosophy, aesthetics, criticism and rhetorical literary theorist
- Chicago School of literary criticism – group of faculty members at the University of Chicago (R.S. Crane, Elder Olson, Wayne Booth) who founded neo-Aristotelianism (Note: Chicago School of literary criticism)
- J. M. Coetzee – 2003 Nobel Prize laureate in Literature; distinguished professor in the Committee on Social Thought
- Anna Crone – linguist and literary theorist on Slavic languages
- T.S. Eliot – influential poet, dramatist and literary critic; member of the University of Chicago's Committee on Social Thought
- Ralph Ellison – National Book Award winner for Invisible Man
- Leela Gandhi – postcolonial theorist and British English professor
- Gerald Graff (A.B. 1959) – former professor of English and Education
- Daryl Hine – poet and translator; MacArthur Fellow in 1986
- James R. Lawler – Edward Carson Waller Distinguished Service Professor in Romance Languages and Literatures (1979–1997)
- Norman Maclean – author of A River Runs Through It
- Thomas Pavel – Gordon J. Laing Distinguished Service Professor in the Committee on Social Thought and the Departments of Romance Languages and Comparative Literature
- Robert Pinsky – poet-critic; former assistant professor of the humanities
- A.K. Ramanujan – poet and scholar of Indian literature; MacArthur Fellow in 1983
- Theodore Silverstein – scholar of medieval literature and poetry
- Mark Strand – former professor in the Committee on Social Thought; Pulitzer Prize winner
- David E. Wellbery – chair of the department of Germanic Studies
- Thornton Wilder – professor (1930–1937); winner of the National Book Award, and the Presidential Medal of Freedom, and three-time winner of the Pulitzer Prize
- Eleanor Wilner – poet
- A.B. Yehoshua – Israeli novelist, essayist, and playwright
- Adam Zagajewski – member of the Committee on Social Thought

== Law School ==
- Douglas Baird – former dean of the Law School
- Gerhard Casper – former dean of the Law School and Provost at the University of Chicago; President Emeritus of Stanford University
- Ronald Coase – professor emeritus of law; Nobel laureate in Economics; co-founder of law and economics movement, arguably the most influential intellectual movement in legal scholarship in the second half of the 20th century
- Aaron Director – played a central role in the development of the law and economics movement; founded the Journal of Law and Economics, which he co-edited with Ronald Coase
- Frank Easterbrook – judge on the 7th Circuit Court of Appeals
- Richard Epstein – currently the James Parker Hall Distinguished Service Professor of Law
- Richard H. Helmholz – legal historian
- Elena Kagan – former professor and dean of Harvard Law School; now a US Supreme Court justice
- Karl Llewellyn – major figure in the school of legal realism
- Michael W. McConnell – federal judge on the US Court of Appeals for the Tenth Circuit; leading constitutional originalist
- Martha Nussbaum – philosopher and public intellectual, currently Ernst Freund Distinguished Service Professor of Law and Ethics
- Barack Obama – president of the United States; taught constitutional law (1992–2004)
- Richard Posner – jurist and economist; United States circuit judge of the United States Court of Appeals for the Seventh Circuit and a senior lecturer at the University of Chicago Law School
- Roberta Cooper Ramo – first woman president, American Bar Association
- Antonin Scalia – United States Supreme Court justice; professor at the Law School (1977–1982)
- Michael H. Schill – president of the University of Oregon, former dean and the Harry N. Wyatt Professor of Law Emeritus at the University of Chicago Law School
- Geoffrey R. Stone – First Amendment scholar, Edward H. Levi Distinguished Service Professor of Law
- Cass Sunstein – Legal scholar, particularly in the fields of constitutional law, administrative law, environmental law, and law and behavioral economics
- James Boyd White – founder of "Law and Literature" movement
- Diane Wood – judge on the 7th Circuit Court of Appeals

== Institute for the Study of Ancient Cultures (formerly the Oriental Institute) ==
- Miguel Civil – professor emeritus of Sumerology
- Fred Donner – professor of Islamic history
- Peter Dorman – professor emeritus of Egyptology
- Norman Golb – Ludwig Rosenberger Professor in Jewish History and Civilization
- Janet Johnson – professor of Egyptology
- Walter Kaegi – professor of Byzantine-Islamic Studies
- Albert T. Olmstead – professor of Assyriology
- Robert K. Ritner – professor of Egyptology
- Martha Roth – professor of Assyriology; editor, Chicago Assyrian Dictionary
- Gil Stein – director of the then-Oriental Institute (2013–2017)
- Matthew Stolper – professor of Assyriology and Achaemenid Empire; director of Persepolis Fortification Project; member of the American Institute of Iranian Studies, American Oriental Society, and British School of Archaeology in Iraq
- Edward F. Wente – professor emeritus of Egyptology
- K. Aslihan Yener – professor of ancient Anatolian archeology; director of the Amuq Valley Regional Projects in Antioch (Antakya, Turkey)

== Near Eastern Languages and Civilizations ==
- Muhammad S. Eissa – professor of Arabic

== Mathematics ==
- Abraham Adrian Albert – developer of Albert algebra
- László Babai – known for work in computer science and discrete mathematics, especially for his work on interactive proof systems; Gödel Prize winner
- Walter Lewis Baily, Jr. – known for work in algebraic geometry, Baily-Borel compactification
- Alexander A. Beilinson – researches representation theory, algebraic geometry, and mathematical physics; Wolf Prize winner
- Gilbert Ames Bliss – worked on calculus of variations, won Chauvenet Prize
- Oskar Bolza – German mathematician known for research on calculus of variations
- Luis Caffarelli – world leader in the field of partial differential equations
- Alberto Calderón – co-founded the Chicago school of mathematical analysis; winner of Bôcher Memorial Prize, the Wolf Prize, and the National Medal of Science
- Ngô Bảo Châu – Fields Medal winner
- Shiing-shen Chern – one of the most influential figures in differential geometry; famous for Chern classes; National Medal of Science and Wolf Prize winner
- Arthur Byron Coble – president of the American Mathematical Society (1933–1934)
- Leonard Eugene Dickson – first recipient of the Cole Prize in algebra
- Vladimir Drinfeld – Fields Medal winner
- Charles Fefferman – received full professorship at the University of Chicago at age 22, making him the youngest ever appointed in the United States; Fields Medal winner
- Victor Ginzburg – known for his works in geometric representation theory
- George Glauberman – works on finite simple groups, proved the ZJ theorem and Z* theorem
- Paul Halmos – mathematician and mathematical expositor
- Israel Herstein – worked in algebra, including ring theory
- Lars Hörmander – Fields Medal winner
- Irving Kaplansky – president of the American Mathematical Society (1985–1986)
- John L. Kelley – taught for one year in Chicago before moving to the University of California, Berkeley
- Serge Lang – known for work in number theory and for textbooks; spent most of career at Yale University
- Greg Lawler – best known for work on Schramm-Loewner evolution; winner of Wolf Prize
- William Lawvere – known for his work in category theory, topos theory, and the philosophy of mathematics
- Saunders Mac Lane – co-founder of category theory
- J. Peter May – algebraic topologist
- Paul Meier – statistician, promoter of randomized trials in medicine
- E. H. Moore – first head of the Mathematics department
- Andrei Okounkov – former Dickson Instructor in Mathematics and the college; Fields Medal winner
- David Pingree – MacArthur Fellow in 1981
- Daniel Quillen – former Dickson Instructor in Mathematics and the college; Fields Medal winner
- Alexander Razborov – Andrew MacLeish Distinguished Service Professor in the Department of Computer Science
- Paul Sally – mathematics educator
- Irving Segal – worked on theoretical quantum mechanics; shares credit for Segal-Shale-Weil representation
- Stephen Smale – Fields Medal and Wolf Prize winner
- Robert Soare – known for work in mathematical logic
- Norman Steenrod – topologist
- Marshall Stone – contributed to real analysis, functional analysis, topology, and Boolean algebras; President of the American Mathematical Society (1943–1944)
- Karen Uhlenbeck – MacArthur Fellow in 1983, first female winner of the Abel Prize
- André Weil – known for seminal work in number theory and algebraic geometry; leader of influential Bourbaki group; Wolf Prize winner
- Efim Zelmanov – Fields Medal winner
- Antoni Zygmund – one of the most influential mathematicians in the field of analysis in the 20th century; co-founder, with student Calderón, of the Chicago school of mathematical analysis

== History ==
- Rachel Fulton Brown – medievalist and associate professor of Medieval History and Fundamentals
- Muzaffar Alam – George V. Bobrinskoy Professor in South Asian Languages and Civilizations
- Kenneth Pomeranz – professor of Chinese and world history, considered a leading figure in the California School of economic history, and former president of the American Historical Association
- Robert Bartlett – professor of medieval history (1984–1992), and currently Wardlaw Professor of Mediaeval History, University of St. Andrew's; Fellow of the Royal Historical Society and author of many books, including The Making of Europe: Conquest, Colonization, and Social Change (Princeton University Press, 1994)
- Daniel Boorstin – professor at the University of Chicago for 25 years; Pulitzer Prize winner (1974); Librarian of Congress
- John W. Boyer – dean of the college and the Martin A. Ryerson Distinguished Service Professor of History
- Mark Philip Bradley – professor at the University of Chicago; chief editor of the The American Historical Review
- James Henry Breasted – professor of Egyptology and Oriental history
- John Leonard Clive– historian, winner of the National Book Award for Biography and History
- Herrlee G. Creel (Ph.B. 1926, A.M. 1927, Ph.D. 1929) – sinologist
- Ioan P. Culianu – historian of religion
- Bruce Cumings – Gustavus F. and Ann M. Swift Distinguished Service Professor in History and the college
- Lorraine Daston – visiting professor in the Committee on Social Thought
- Shannon Lee Dawdy – associate professor, MacArthur Fellow
- William Dodd – historian of the old South and ambassador to Germany from 1933 to 1937
- Fred M. Donner – professor of Near Eastern history; Guggenheim Fellow (2007)
- Stanley Elkins – American historian, best known for his influential, yet controversial, comparison of slavery in the United States to Nazi concentration camps
- Sheila Fitzpatrick – Bernadotte E. Schmitt Distinguished Service Professor of History; historian of modern Russian and Soviet history
- Cornell Fleischer – Kanuni Suleyman Professor of Ottoman and Modern Turkish Studies; MacArthur "Genius" Fellow (1988)
- John Hope Franklin – pioneering scholar of African-American history; civil rights leader; professor of history from 1964; John Matthews Manly Distinguished Service Professor, 1969–1982; resident of the American Historical Association (1979); winner of the Presidential Medal of Freedom and the Pulitzer Prize
- Ramón A. Gutiérrez – Preston & Sterling Morton Distinguished Service Professor of United States History; director of the Center for the Study of Race, Politics and Culture; author of award-winning book When Jesus Came the Corn Mothers Went Away: Marriage, Sexuality and Power in New Mexico, 1500–1846 (Stanford: Stanford University Press, 1991); MacArthur Fellow (1983) (Note: MacArthur Fellow list of winners)
- Jan E. Goldstein – intellectual historian of modern Europe, co-editor of The Journal of Modern History
- Gustave E. von Grunebaum – historian and Arabist
- Neil Harris – historian, former director of the National Humanities Institute and chairman of the American Council of Learned Societies
- Marshall G. S. Hodgson – pioneer in Islamic Studies and global history, member of the Committee on Social Thought
- Thomas C. Holt – James Westfall Thompson Professor of American and African American History; MacArthur Fellow in 1990
- Akira Iriye – professor of history until 1989; now Charles Warren Professor Emeritus of American History at Harvard; leading diplomatic and international historian, specializing in U.S.-Japan relations during the 20th century; Guggenheim Fellow (1974) and president of the American Historical Association (1988)
- Walter Kaegi – professor of Byzantine and late Roman history; co-founder of the Byzantine Studies Conference; editor of the Byzantinische Forschungen journal; voting member of Oriental Institute, Chicago; author of many books, including Byzantium and the Decline of Rome and "Byzantine Military Unrest 471–843: An Interpretation
- Leszek Kołakowski – philosopher and historian of ideas; MacArthur Fellow in 1983
- William Hardy McNeill – professor emeritus of History
- Eric McKitrick – American historian, recipient of the 1994 Bancroft Prize
- Arnaldo Momigliano – historiographer; MacArthur Fellow in 1987
- David Nirenberg – Deborah R. and Edgar D. Jannotta Professor of Medieval History and Committee on Social Thought
- Ada Palmer – associate professor of Early Modern European History and the College, author of the Terra Ignota series
- Francesca Rochberg – Assyriologist, historian of science
- Hans Rothfels – professor of history (1946–1951)
- Bernadotte E. Schmitt – winner of the Pulitzer Prize
- Francis W. Shepardson – founding faculty member and professor of history (1892–1917), secretary to the university's president from 1897 to 1904, and dean of the senior colleges (graduate schools) from 1904 to 1907
- Noel Swerdlow – winner of a Macarthur Fellowship
- James Westfall Thompson – professor of history (1895–1933), leading American historian of the European Middle Ages and early modern period; president of the American Historical Association, 1941 (died in office)
- Karl Weintraub – professor of history (1954–2004) and leading scholar of European cultural history and the history of autobiography
- John Woods – professor of Iranian and Central Asian history

== Classics ==
- Danielle Allen – dean of the Division of Humanities; MacArthur Fellow
- Clifford Ando – professor of Roman Empire history; author of Imperial Ideology and Provincial Loyalty in the Roman Empire (2000) (which won APA's Goodwin Award in 2003), and The Matter of the Gods (2008); editor of Roman Religion (2003) and co-editor, with Jörg Rüpke, of Religion and Law in Classical and Christian Rome (2006)
- Shadi Bartsch – professor of gender issues in antiquity and in Roman literature and culture; Quantrell Teaching Award and Faculty Award for Excellence in Graduate Teaching
- Jonathan M. Hall – professor of Greek history; chair of Classics Department; author of Ethnic Identity in Greek Antiquity (Cambridge, 1997); APA's Goodwin Award; 2004 Gordon J. Laing Prize; Quantrell Teaching Award; Phyllis Fay Horton Distinguished Service
- Amy Judith Kass (née Apfel) – professor of classic texts in the College of the University of Chicago
- James M. Redfield – Edward Olson Distinguished Service Professor of Classics
- Peter White – professor of Roman poetry, comedy and satire and Greco-Roman historiography; Associate Chair for Undergraduate Affairs; author of Promised Verse: Poets in the Society of Augustan Rome; APA's Goodwin Award; Quantrell Teaching Award

== Philosophy ==
- Hannah Arendt – former professor in the Committee on Social Thought
- Rudolf Carnap – professor of philosophy; leading member of the Vienna Circle
- Stanley Cavell – visiting lecturer on philosophy
- Arnold Davidson – professor of the Philosophy of Religion in the Divinity School; also in the Department of Philosophy, the Department of Comparative Literature, the Committee on Historical and Conceptual Studies of Science, and the college
- Donald Davidson – professor of philosophy (1976–1981)
- John Dewey – former professor of philosophy
- Burton Dreben – logician, became an instructor in 1955
- Charles Hartshorne – former professor of philosophy
- John Haugeland – David B. and Clara E. Stern Professor of Philosophy
- Anthony Kenny – visiting professor of philosophy
- Charles Larmore – Chester D. Tripp Professor and the Raymond W. & Martha Hilpert Gruner Distinguished Service Professor
- Jonathan Lear – John U. Nef Distinguished Service Professor at the Committee on Social Thought and in the Department of Philosophy
- Jean-Luc Marion – professor of the Philosophy of Religion and Theology in the Divinity School; also in the Department of Philosophy and the Committee on Social Thought
- George Herbert Mead – former professor of philosophy
- Martha Nussbaum – Ernst Freund Distinguished Service Professor of Law and Ethics in the Divinity School; also in the Law School, the Department of Philosophy, and the college
- Robert B. Pippin – Evelyn Stefansson Nef Distinguished Service Professor in the John U. Nef Committee on Social Thought, the Department of Philosophy, and the college
- Paul Ricoeur – John Nuveen Professor Emeritus in the Divinity School (1971–1991)
- Bertrand Russell – visiting professor of philosophy (1938–1939)
- Howard Stein – philosopher and historian of science
- Leo Strauss – professor of political philosophy (1949–1967)
- Paul Johannes Tillich – professor of religion (1962)
- James Hayden Tufts – former professor of philosophy

== Religion ==
- Richard T. Antoun – professor (1989); professor emeritus of anthropology at Binghamton University; stabbed to death by student in 2009
- J. A. B. van Buitenen – George V. Bobrinskoy Professor of Sanskrit in the Department of South Asian Languages and Civilizations
- Wendy Doniger – Historian of Religions (1978– )
- Mircea Eliade – Sewell Avery Distinguished Service Professor of the History of Religions (1958–1986), best known for his "myth of the Eternal Return" and his book The Sacred and the Profane: The Nature of Religion
- Joseph Kitagawa – historian of religions
- Hans Küng – Catholic priest, theologian, and author
- Bruce Lincoln – historian of religions
- Martin Marty – Lutheran religious scholar
- David Tracy – professor emeritus of theology (1970–); leading figure in theological hermeneutics and proponent of theological pluralism in works such as Plurality and Ambiguity
- Joachim Wach – historian of religions (1944–1955)
- Christian K. Wedemeyer – associate professor of the history of religions; MacArthur Fellow in 1987

== Science ==
- Warder Clyde Allee – ecologist and professor of zoology
- Zonia Baber – geographer and geologist
- Myrtle Bachelder – chemist and Women's Army Corps officer; noted for her secret work on the Manhattan Project atomic bomb program, and for the development of techniques in the chemistry of metals
- R. Stephen Berry – physical chemist; MacArthur Fellow in 1983
- J Harlen Bretz – professor of geology
- Ralph Buchsbaum – invertebrate zoologist
- John T. Cacioppo – biological psychologist, Tiffany and Margaret Blake Distinguished Service Professor
- Marcela Carena – particle physicist
- John Carlstrom – astrophysicist; MacArthur Fellow
- Sean M. Carroll – cosmologist
- Thomas Chrowder Chamberlin – geologist; developed planetesimal theory
- Subrahmanyan Chandrasekhar – 1983 Nobel Prize laureate in Physics
- Fay-Cooper Cole – witness at the Scopes Monkey Trial
- Arthur Compton – physicist who discovered the Compton effect and oversaw the Manhattan Project
- Jerry Coyne – professor emeritus; specialist in speciation and evolutionary genetics
- Andrew M. Davis – professor of astronomy and geophysical sciences; developed resonant ionization mass spectrometry
- Savas Dimopoulos – particle physicist
- Michael Dickinson – bioengineer and neuroscientist
- Guangbin Dong – organic chemist
- Enrico Fermi – 1938 Nobel Prize laureate in Physics
- Zachary Fisk – condensed matter physicist
- Ian Foster – computer scientist, pioneer of Grid Computing
- James Franck – Nobel laureate
- Karl Freed – physical chemist
- Daniel Friedan – theoretical physicist; MacArthur Fellow in 1987
- T. Theodore Fujita – atmospheric scientist and renowned tornado expert; developer of Fujita scale
- Murray Gell-Mann – 1969 Nobel Prize in Physics
- Henry A. Gleason – ecologist, botanist, and taxonomist
- Maria Goeppert-Mayer – developed model for nuclear shell structure at the University of Chicago, for which she received a Nobel in Physics in 1963
- George Ellery Hale – solar astronomer, best known for his discovery of magnetic fields in sunspots
- James Hartle – theoretical physicist at the Enrico Fermi Institute
- Chuan He – professor of chemistry; chemical biologist
- Gerhard Herzberg – 1971 Nobel Prize laureate in Chemistry
- Edwin Hubble – astronomer, observational cosmologist
- Clyde A. Hutchison Jr. – physical chemist
- Ole J. Kleppa – pioneer in high temperature thermochemistry; inventor of the Kleppa Calorimeter
- Edward W. Kolb – cosmologist
- Martin Kreitman – geneticist; MacArthur Fellow in 1991
- Bruce Lahn – professor of human genetics
- Richard Lewontin – pioneered use of molecular biology on questions of evolution and genetic variation
- Albert J. Libchaber – physicist; recipient of Wolf Prize in Physics in 1986; MacArthur Fellow in 1986
- Frank Rattray Lillie – embryologist and zoologist
- Joseph Lykken – particle physicist
- Dario Maestripieri – behavioral biologist
- Joseph Edward Mayer – physical chemist
- Martha McClintock – biological psychologist
- Albert A. Michelson – first American Nobel laureate in the sciences; known for the Michelson-Morley experiment, a cornerstone of relativity theory; measured the speed of light
- Robert Millikan – Nobel laureate in Physics; known for his measurement of the charge of the electron and the photoelectric effect; performed famed oil-drop experiment at the University of Chicago's Ryerson Laboratory, which has been designated a historic physics landmark by the American Physical Society
- Robert S. Mulliken – 1966 Nobel Prize in Chemistry; 1983 Priestley Medal
- John Keith Moffat – Louis Block Professor in Biochemistry, Molecular, and Cell Biology; former Deputy Provost for Research; and Guggenheim Fellow noted for Time resolved crystallography
- Yoichiro Nambu – winner of Sakurai Prize, Wolf Prize, Nobel Prize in Physics, and the National Medal of Science; considered founder of string theory; known for "color charge" in quantum chromodynamics and work on spontaneous symmetry breaking in particle physics
- Eugene Parker – astrophysicist, known for his work on the solar wind
- Stuart Rice – chemist; National Medal of Science winner
- Howard Taylor Ricketts – pathologist
- Bernard Roizman – virologist, member of the National Academy of Sciences
- Clemens C. J. Roothaan – physicist and chemist
- Lanny D. Schmidt – inventor and researcher, member of the National Academy of Engineering
- Florence B. Seibert – biochemist, winner of the Garvan–Olin Medal; member of the National Women's Hall of Fame
- Stephen Shenker – theoretical physicist, string theorist; MacArthur Fellow in 1987
- Paul Sigler – former professor; worked out the structure of the RNA molecule responsible for the initiation of protein synthesis
- Maria Spiropulu – particle physicist
- Otto Struve – astronomer
- Leo Szilard – physicist
- Lucy Graves Taliaferro – parasitologist
- Edward Teller – "father of the hydrogen bomb"
- Michael S. Turner – cosmologist
- Russell Tuttle – primate morphologist
- Harold Urey – 1934 Nobel Prize laureate in Chemistry
- Robert M. Wald – gravitational physicist
- Carlos E.M. Wagner – particle physicist
- Frank Wilczek – theoretical physicist, mathematician; 2004 Nobel Prize laureate
- Sewall Wright – National Medal of Science winner; one of the founders of population genetics

== Medicine and health policy ==
- Susan L. Cohn – professor of pediatrics and dean for clinical research
- Nellie X. Hawkinson (1886– 1971) – professor in nursing education
- Raphael Carl Lee – surgeon, medical researcher, biomedical engineer; MacArthur Fellow in 1981
- Nathaniel Kleitman – physiologist and sleep researcher, recognized as the father of modern sleep research
- Olufunmilayo Olopade – Distinguished Service Professor in Medicine and Human Genetics; MacArthur Fellow
- Harold Pollack – professor and chair of the Center for Health Administration Studies
- Mark Siegler – director of the MacLean Center for Clinical Medical Ethics
- Daniel Sulmasy – medical ethicist
- Darrel Waggoner – director of Human Genetics

== Social sciences ==
- James A. Robinson – Reverend Dr. Richard L. Pearson Professor of Global Conflict Studies and University Professor at Harris School of Public Policy
- Arjun Appadurai (A.M. 1973, Ph.D. 1976) – former professor of anthropology
- Gary Becker (A.M. 1953, Ph.D. 1955) – University Professor in Economics, Graduate School of Business, and Sociology
- Katherine Baicker – health economist, dean and Emmett Dedmon Professor at Harris School of Public Policy
- Chris Blattman – economist, political scientist, member of the Pearson Institute
- Leonard Bloomfield – linguist who led the development of structural linguistics
- Manasi Deshpande – labor economist and 2023 Sloan Fellow
- Dipesh Chakrabarty – Lawrence A. Kimpton Distinguished Service Professor in History and South Asian Languages & Civilizations
- Ronald Coase – Clifton R. Musser Professor Emeritus of Economics, The Law School
- Eve Ewing – associate professor Department of Race, Diaspora, and Indigeneity
- Constantin Fasolt – professor of Early Modern European history
- Robert Fogel – Charles R. Walgreen Distinguished Service Professor of American Institutions
- John Hope Franklin – John Matthews Manly Distinguished Service Professor Emeritus in History
- Milton Friedman – Paul Snowden Russell Distinguished Service Professor Emeritus in Economics
- Susan Gal – Mae & Sidney G. Metzl Distinguished Service Professor of Anthropology and Linguistics; leading scholar in studies of Eastern Europe, linguistic anthropology, and gender
- Clifford Geertz – professor of anthropology (1960–1970)
- Matthew Gentzkow – Richard O. Ryan Professor of Economics and Neubauer Family Faculty Fellow
- Susan Goldin-Meadow – Beardsley Ruml Distinguished Service Professor in the Departments of Psychology, Comparative Human Development, the college, and the Committee on Education
- Chauncy Harris – pioneering geographer at the University of Chicago in the first department of geography in the United States
- Friedrich Hayek – former professor in the Committee on Social Thought
- James Heckman – winner of the Nobel Memorial Prize in Economics in 2000
- Hans Joas – visiting professor of sociology and social thought and a member of the Committee on Social Thought at the University of Chicago
- Morton A. Kaplan – professor of political science
- Evelyn M. Kitagawa (B.A. 1941, Ph.D. 1951) – professor of sociology
- Karin Knorr-Cetina – George Wells Beadle Distinguished Service Professor of Anthropology and Sociology
- Lawrence Kohlberg (A.B. 1949, Ph.D. 1958) – professor in the Committee on Human Development (1962–1968)
- Maynard C. Krueger – socialist vice-presidential candidate and professor of economics 1933? – ??
- Harold Lasswell – one of the most influential political scientists of the 20th century
- Karl Lashley – gestaltist psychologist
- Steven Levitt – Alvin H. Baum Professor in Economics
- Mark Lilla – professor in the Committee on Social Thought (1999–2007)
- John A. List – economist, pioneer in the field of experimental economics
- Robert Lucas Jr. (A.B. 1959, Ph.D. 1964) – John Dewey Distinguished Service Professor in Economics
- Jacob Marschak – economist, leader of the Cowles Commission
- Raven I. McDavid, Jr. – linguist, dialectologist
- John Mearsheimer – R. Wendell Harrison Distinguished Service Professor of Political Science
- Charles Edward Merriam – founder of the behavioral approach to political science
- Merton H. Miller – Robert R. McCormick Distinguished Service Professor Emeritus, Graduate School of Business
- Hans Morgenthau – international relations theorist; his book Politics Among Nations defined the international relations field
- Robert Pape (Ph.D. 1988) – professor of political science
- Vivian Paley – early childhood education researcher; MacArthur Fellow in 1989
- Robert E. Park – professor of sociology (1914–1936)
- Henry Paulson – fellow at the Harris School of Public Policy Studies and the chairman of the Paulson Institute; 74th United States Secretary of the Treasury
- William R. Polk – established the Center for Middle Eastern Studies, serving as Founding Director
- Kenneth Prewitt – director of the Census Bureau from 1998 to 2001, appointed assistant professor in 1965
- Alfred Radcliffe-Brown – professor of anthropology (1931–1937); developed theory of Structural Functionalism
- Raghuram Rajan – Katherine Dusak Miller Distinguished Service Professor of Finance at the Booth School of Business, former chief economist at the International Monetary Fund, former governor of the Reserve Bank of India and former chief economic advisor to the Prime Minister of India; author of Saving Capitalism from the Capitalists with Luigi Zingales, Fault Lines, I Do What i Do and The Third Pillar
- Robert Redfield – professor of anthropology (1927–1958)
- Albert Rees – former University of Chicago and Princeton University economics professor, former provost at Princeton, advisor to President Gerald Ford
- Carl Rogers – one of the founders of humanistic psychology
- Marshall Sahlins – Charles F. Grey Distinguished Service Professor Emeritus of Anthropology
- Edward Sapir – creator of the Sapir–Whorf hypothesis, arguably the most influential figure in American linguistics
- Saskia Sassen – Ralph Lewis Professor of Sociology (1998–2007)
- David M. Schneider – professor of anthropology (1960–1986)
- Michael Schudson – journalism expert (1976–1980)
- Richard Shweder – Harold H. Swift Distinguished Service Professor of Human Development in the Department of Comparative Human Development
- Michael Silverstein – Charles F. Grey Distinguished Service Professor of anthropology, linguistics, and psychology; MacArthur Fellow in 1982
- Theda Skocpol – former professor of sociology (1981–1986); now Dean of Graduate School of Arts and Sciences at Harvard
- George Stigler – Charles R. Walgreen Distinguished Service Professor in Economics and Graduate School of Business
- Stanley Jeyaraja Tambiah – specialised in studies of Thailand, Sri Lanka, and Tamils, as well as the anthropology of religion and politics
- William I. Thomas (Ph.D. 1896) – professor of sociology (1896–1918)
- Frederic Thrasher – sociologist and prominent member of the Chicago School of Sociology
- Victor Turner – former professor in the Committee on Social Thought
- Thorstein Veblen – professor of political economy (1892–1906)
- Stephen Walt – former professor (1989–1999) and deputy dean of social sciences (1996–1999); dean of Harvard's John F. Kennedy School of Government after tenure at the University of Chicago
- Naomi Weisstein – professor of psychology; Guggenheim fellow
- William Julius Wilson – Lucy Flower University Professor of Sociology (1972–1996)
- Albert Wohlstetter – awarded Presidential Medal of Freedom; influenced prominent neoconservatives, including Paul Wolfowitz; prominent theorist of the Cold War
- Dali Yang – William Claude Reavis Professor in the Department of Political Science, Faculty Director of the University of Chicago Center in Beijing
- Theodore O. Yntema (Ph.D. 1929) – economist, director of the Cowles Commission
- Iris Marion Young – former professor of political science

== Arts and entertainment ==
- Easley Blackwood Jr. – composer
- Walter Blair – English professor
- Jan Chiapusso – piano pedagogue
- John Eaton – composer; MacArthur Fellow in 1990
- Roger Ebert (X. 1970) – film critic and lecturer at Graham School; winner of the Pulitzer Prize
- Cécile Fromont – art historian
- Philip Gossett – musicologist and scholar of 19th-century Italian opera
- Iñigo Manglano-Ovalle – MacArthur Fellow in 2001
- Paul B. Moses – art historian
- Shulamit Ran – William H. Colvin Professor of Music, 1973–present; winner of the Pulitzer Prize; student of Ralph Shapey
- Ralph Shapey – composer; MacArthur Fellow in 1982
- Jacqueline Stewart – film history
- Jessica Stockholder – sculptor, Arts Department chair
