= James E. Miller =

James E. Miller Jr.
- Born: James Edwin Miller Jr. September 9, 1920; Bartlesville, Oklahoma, U.S.
- Died: September 9, 2010 (aged 90); Chicago, Illinois, U.S.

Academic background
- Education: University of Oklahoma (BA, 1942); University of Chicago (MA, 1947; PhD, 1949)

Academic work
- Discipline: American literature
- Sub-discipline: Walt Whitman studies
- Institutions: University of Nebraska–Lincoln; University of Chicago
- Notable works: A Critical Guide to Leaves of Grass (1957); The American Quest for a Supreme Fiction (1979)

James E. Miller Jr. (1920–2010) was an American scholar and the Helen A. Regenstein Professor Emeritus of English Language and Literature at the University of Chicago, where he completed his graduate work, taught, and served as chairman of the English department.

He also served as president of the Midwest Modern Language Association (1961–1962), president of the National Council of Teachers of English (1969–1970), and editor of the journal College English (1960–1966). He served as an editorial adviser to the journals Prairie Schooner, American Literature, Walt Whitman Quarterly Review, Modern Philology, Critical Inquiry, Studies in American Fiction, and American Poetry.

== Life and Teaching Career ==
Born and raised in Oklahoma, Miller completed his undergraduate studies at the University of Oklahoma in 1942, before serving as a cryptographer in the United States Army. After World War II, he attended the University of Chicago under the G.I. Bill, receiving his master's degree in 1947 and his PhD in American literature in 1949, with a dissertation on F. Scott Fitzgerald (directed by Walter Blair).

Miller taught at the University of Nebraska–Lincoln from 1953 to 1961, becoming chairman of its English department, before returning to the University of Chicago in 1962, where he chaired its English department from 1978 to 1984. Miller retired in 1990.

Miller died on his ninetieth birthday at his home in Hyde Park, Chicago, from kidney failure and sepsis. He had suffered from Alzheimer's disease in his later years. He had been married twice, and had two children, and a stepdaughter.

== Work ==
Specializing in American literature, Miller published over twenty books and various articles on authors such as T. S. Eliot, Herman Melville, and Walt Whitman. His influential work on Eliot considered personal correspondence and the accounts of friends as well as an in-depth reading of Eliot's early work up to and including The Waste Land. Miller also contended that though Eliot lived in England much of his life, he remained quintessentially an American writer. Miller's early work on J. D. Salinger was among the first of its kind to be published. Throughout his career, Miller traveled and taught extensively in Japan, Australia, France, Italy, and elsewhere.

Miller was particularly influential in Whitman studies. Influenced by New Criticism, his early essays on Whitman's poetry, later revised and collected in A Critical Guide to Leaves of Grass (1957), emphasized Whitman's artistry and helped elevate his standing in the academy. He also co-authored Start with the Sun (1960) with Bernice Slote and Karl Shapiro, edited Whitman's "Song of Myself": Origin, Growth, Meaning (1964), which presented parallel versions of the poem's 1855 and 1892 texts, and published The American Quest for a Supreme Fiction (1979), a study of Whitman's influence on twentieth-century poetry.

Miller was honored as one of four Centennial Scholars at the 1992 Whitman Centennial Conference at the University of Iowa and as the sole Whitman Sesquicentennial Scholar at the 2005 conference at the University of Nebraska–Lincoln, commemorating the 150th anniversary of Leaves of Grass.

== Selected bibliography ==
=== Selected books (as author or editor) ===
- Miller, James E., Jr. A Critical Guide to Leaves of Grass. Chicago: University of Chicago Press, 1957.
- Miller, James E., Jr., Karl Shapiro, and Bernice Slote. Start with the Sun: Studies in Cosmic Poetry. Lincoln: University of Nebraska Press, 1960.
- Miller, James E., Jr., ed. Whitman's "Song of Myself": Origin, Growth, Meaning. New York: Dodd, Mead, 1964.
- Miller, James E., Jr. T. S. Eliot's Personal Waste Land: Exorcism of the Demons. University Park: Pennsylvania State University Press, 1977.
- Miller, James E., Jr. The American Quest for a Supreme Fiction: Whitman's Legacy in the Personal Epic. Chicago: University of Chicago Press, 1979.
- Miller, James E., Jr. Leaves of Grass: America's Lyric-Epic of Self and Democracy. New York: Twayne Publishers, 1992.
- Miller, James E., Jr. T. S. Eliot: The Making of an American Poet, 1888–1922. University Park: Pennsylvania State University Press, 2005.

=== Selected articles and chapters ===
- Miller, James E., Jr. "'Song of Myself' as Inverted Mystical Experience." PMLA 70, no. 4, part 1 (September 1955): 636–661. doi:10.2307/460106
- Miller, James E., Jr. "Whitman's 'Calamus': The Leaf and the Root." PMLA 72, no. 1 (March 1957): 249–271. doi:10.2307/460228
- Miller, James E., Jr. "Whitman Then and Now: A Reminiscence." Walt Whitman Quarterly Review 8, no. 2 (Fall 1990): 92–101. doi:10.13008/2153-3695.1283
- Miller, James E., Jr. "Whitman's Multitudinous Poetic Progeny: Particular and Puzzling Instances." In Walt Whitman: The Centennial Essays, edited by Ed Folsom, 185–200. Iowa City: University of Iowa Press, 1994. doi:10.2307/j.ctt20h6vc8.20
- Miller, James E., Jr. "'Poets to Come . . . Leaving It to You to Prove and Define It': Lucy Chen, Whitman, T. S. Eliot, and Poets Unknown." In Whitman East and West: New Contexts for Reading Walt Whitman, edited by Ed Folsom, 1–13. Iowa City: University of Iowa Press, 2002. doi:10.2307/j.ctt20q20x5.6
