= Jeanne Boyd =

American composer

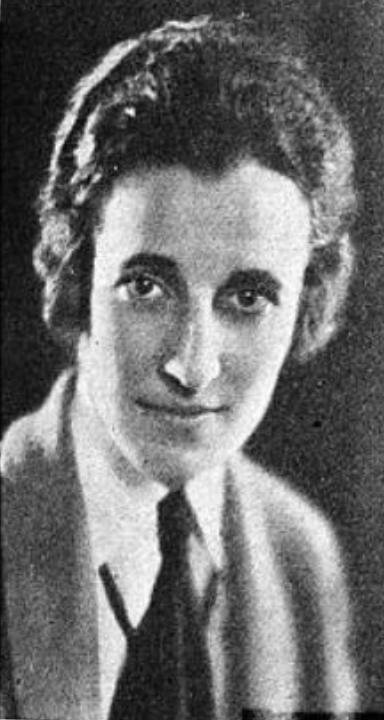
- Jeanne Boyd, from a 1927 publication
- Born: Jeanne Margaret Boyd; February 25, 1890; Mount Carroll, Illinois, U.S.
- Died: August 8, 1968 (age 78); Jonesboro, Arkansas, U.S.
- Occupations: Composer, pianist, music educator, musical arranger

Jeanne Margaret Boyd (February 25, 1890 – August 8, 1968) was an American pianist, composer, arranger, and music educator, based in Chicago.

== Early life and education ==
Boyd was born in Mount Carroll, Illinois, and raised in Fremont, Nebraska, the daughter of James P. W. Boyd and Jane Hughes Boyd (later known as Mrs. A. F. Plambeck). She attended the Frances Shimer School, and studied music with Emil Liebling, Lyravine Votaw, and Edgar A. Brazelton.

== Career ==
Boyd taught at the Frances Shimer School from 1909 to 1914, and at the Lyceum Arts Conservatory from 1914 to 1917. In 1922 she spent two months in residence at the MacDowell Colony. She taught at the Bush Conservatory of Music in the 1920s. She also led workshops for piano accompanists. Boyd gave recitals of her own works and those of other composers. She was a member of the Society of American Musicians. In the 1940s and 1950s she taught at the American Conservatory of Music.

== Compositions ==
=== Instrumental ===
- Symphonic suite (1922)
- Song against Ease (1940s, symphonic poem)
- Eleventurous dances (1943, 1951; suite)
- Introduction and fugue (1949)
- Sonatine for Piano (1950s)
- Andante lamentoso

=== Vocal ===
Boyd set the works of several poets to music, including poems by Sharmel Iris, Wilbur D. Nesbit, and Alan Seeger. She wrote songs for school use, including a children's cantata, and patriotic songs. Several of Boyd's songs were compiled in a book, Songs (1960).

- "In Italy" (1915, lyrics by Sharmel Iris)
- "Canzonetta" (1915, lyrics by Sharmel Iris)
- "Your Flag and My Flag" (1916, lyrics by Wilbur D. Nesbit)
- "At morning" (1916, lyrics by Sharmel Iris)
- "The Lost Road" (1916, lyrics by Sharmel Iris)
- "The Light" and "The Fairy Pool" (1916, lyrics by Veta Thorpe)
- "To a Child" (1917, lyrics by Sharmel Iris)
- "Mist of the Night" (1917)
- "I Have a Rendezvous with Death" (1918, words by Alan Seeger)
- "La Tarantella" (1920, lyrics by Sharmel Iris)
- The Hunting of the Snark (1929, a children's cantata based on the Lewis Carroll poem)
- "Flag of my Land" (1933)
- "Wind from the South" (1941, lyrics by Boyd)
- "When the Bobolink Sings"
- "Psalm CXXXII" (1957, with Joseph Lukewicz)
- "The Lord's Prayer" (1962, with Arline Ellison)

=== Arrangements and descants ===
In addition to her original compositions, Boyd arranged familiar European music (sometimes for publication with English lyrics), and wrote descants for popular hymns, including works by Charles T. Griffes, Cyril Scott, John Liptrot Hatton, Henry Smart, Edvard Grieg, Frederic Hymen Cowen, Joseph Barnby, Sergei Rachmaninoff, and Émile Paladilhe.

== Personal life ==
Boyd died in 1968, at the age of 78, at a rest home in Jonesboro, Arkansas.
