= Garrett Stewart =

- Born: January 5, 1945 (age 81)
- Awards: Guggenheim Fellowship (1978); American Academy of Arts and Sciences (2010); Perkins Prize (2011)

Education
- Education: Yale University (MA, PhD); University of Southern California (BA)

Philosophical work
- Institutions: University of California, Santa Barbara; University of Iowa
- Language: English
- Main interests: Victorian literature; Film theory; Stylistics; Narratology; Media studies; Visuality Studies; Conceptual art
- Notable works: Death Sentences (1984); Reading Voices (1990); Novel Violence (2009)
- Notable ideas: Subvocalization, Phonotext, Narratography

Garrett Stewart (born January 5, 1945) is an American literary and film theorist known for his work on close reading, narrative theory, and the relationship between print and cinematic form. He served as the James O. Freedman Professor of Letters in the English Department at the University of Iowa from 1993 until his retirement in 2025, following earlier appointments at Boston University and the University of California, Santa Barbara. Stewart held a Guggenheim Fellowship in 1978–79, was elected to the American Academy of Arts and Sciences in 2010, and in 2011 received the Barbara Perkins and George Perkins Prize from the International Society for the Study of Narrative for Novel Violence: A Narratography of Victorian Fiction.

== Career ==
Stewart graduated with a B.A. from the University of Southern California in 1967 and then earned a Ph.D. in English from Yale University in 1971. He taught at Boston University (1971–76) and the University of California, Santa Barbara (1976–93) before joining the University of Iowa faculty in 1993.

Across his career, Stewart has pursued a methodology of intense close-reading in the mediums of print, film, and (most recently) conceptual art. He describes his own work as existing at the intersection of stylistics and narrative theory. Examining the ways in which the larger structures of plot are operative at even the smallest of scales prompted Stewart in 2007 to develop the term "narratography" in Framed Time: Toward a Postfilmic Cinema—a mapping of the ways in which technique constructs a particular narrative mode, whether in terms of stylistics (print) or editing/montage (film). Stewart describes narratography as "searching out the 'microplots' of narrative development in the inflections of technique, audiovisual or linguistic".

== Awards and honors ==
Stewart's fellowships and honors include a Guggenheim Fellowship (1978–79), a National Endowment for the Humanities Senior Fellowship (1990–91), a Camargo Foundation Fellowship (2002), election to the American Academy of Arts and Sciences (2010), the Barbara Perkins and George Perkins Prize from the International Society for the Study of Narrative (2011), and a Leverhulme Fellowship at Queen Mary University of London (2015).

== Professional service ==
Stewart has served on the MLA Publications Committee (1996–99) and MLA First Book Prize Committee (1998–2000), on the editorial board of PMLA (1999–2001), and as a jury member for the Truman Capote Award for Literary Criticism (2001–17). Since 2009 he has served on the editorial advisory board of Film Quarterly, and since 2018 on the advisory board for Cambridge University Press's series on twenty-first-century literature.

Stewart has held visiting professorships at Stanford University (1986), Princeton University (1987–88 and again in 2019, as Humanities Council Visiting Professor), the University of Fribourg in Switzerland (1995–96), Queen Mary University of London (2012, as Distinguished Visiting Professor), and the University of Konstanz in Germany (2018).

== Work and main ideas ==
In his 1990 book Reading Voices: Literature and the Phonotext, Stewart argues that literature, despite its visual appearance, is essentially an acoustic medium. He draws on the neurophysiological phenomenon of "subvocalization" to suggest that literary poetics are produced by the "voice" that the reader gives to a text—what Stewart calls the "phonetic undertow of literary writing," a sensibility David LaRocca describes as Stewart's own "secondary vocality." Subvocalization has been corroborated by empirical science. Minuscule movements in the larynx and other muscles involved in speech have been observed in subjects during silent reading. While the vocal cords do not outwardly activate, it has been proposed that subvocalization reduces the cognitive load on working memory, and that reading comprehension depends as much on the way words "sound" in the reader's mind as it does on the words' visual (typographical) arrangement. Stewart argues that this phonotext, so often ignored by the "phonophobia" of post-Derridean deconstruction, opens up new inroads to literary analysis. (When Shakespeare's Juliet asks "What's in a name?", for example, aurally she might also declare, "What sin a name"). The book's central terminology has since been taken up as a point of reference in scholarship on literature and sound. Stewart's distinction between "phonotext" and "graphotext" has become part of standard academic terminology in literary and sound studies, leading one scholar to credit Reading Voices with prompting "an accelerating expansion of the corpus of serious work dedicated to unearthing literature's fundamental engagement" with vocal sound. The L=A=N=G=U=A=G=E poet Charles Bernstein has been among Stewart's readers and built on the concept in his own work.

In his 1999 book Between Film and Screen: Modernism's Photo Synthesis, Stewart draws on ideas in film theory—specifically the work of Gilles Deleuze as well as British screen theory and its emphasis on the cinematic apparatus—to argue that as an art form cinema is haunted by its basis in still photography, an argument David LaRocca traces through the book's closing chapter, "Modernism's Flicker Effect." While cinema creates the illusion of live action, this is only made possible by a strip of still frames as they speed past the projector. Stewart is interested in the ways in which film tries, and often fails, to repress this stillness in its representations of time and movement. In this respect, he views the various techniques of cinematic plotting to be influenced—if not determined—by the very machinery that makes them possible. If that's the case, then new/different film technologies ought to engender new/different kinds of plots and cinematic styles. Such is Stewart's contention in a follow-up book, Framed Time: Toward a Postfilmic Cinema (2007), where he argues that digital filmmaking is subsequently haunted by its basis, not in still photography, but the pixel array, leading to the internally-morphing representations of time in recent sci-fi films like the Wachowskis' The Matrix (1999) or Spielberg's Minority Report (2002).

Stewart has published numerous other books, ranging from language in Charles Dickens to representations of death in British fiction. More recently his scholarship has turned toward digital cinema and modes of surveillance (e.g., Closed Circuits: Screening Narrative Surveillance [2014]) as well as conceptual art (e.g., Bookwork: Medium to Object to Concept to Art [2011] and Transmedium: Conceptualism 2.0 and the New Object Art [2017]). He describes the common linkage between these various projects:

For me, it's always first of all the medium that matters—and in a quite material sense, including the differential function of phonetics and frame-advance in literary and film "texts" respectively. Or cross-wired technical effects in conceptual art. With interpretive viewing posited as its own kind of "reading," my emphasis is everywhere on process rather than product: on knowing how it is that we read before determining what it is, in all its cultural and political ramifications, that we are out to understand.

In 2024, Stewart published Attention Spans: Garrett Stewart, a Reader, an anthology of prior works with new critiques by Stewart himself. This was followed in 2025 by Bandwidths: Reading Across Media with Garrett Stewart, in which Stewart and a collection of literary critics, film scholars and philosophers write about each other's works. Concluding the trilogy, Stewart published Closer Reading: Garrett Stewart's Essays in Refraction, a collection of new essays on film, literary fiction, conceptual art, and more, in 2025.

Stewart retired from the University of Iowa in June 2025 and was granted emeritus status.

== Works by Garrett Stewart ==
Books

- Stewart, Garrett (1974). Dickens and the Trials of Imagination. Cambridge, MA: Harvard University Press. ISBN 978-0674204409.
- Stewart, Garrett (1984). Death Sentences: Styles of Dying in British Fiction. Cambridge, MA: Harvard University Press. ISBN 978-0674194281.
- Stewart, Garrett (1990). Reading Voices: Literature and the Phonotext. Berkeley: University of California Press. ISBN 978-0520068773.
- Stewart, Garrett (1996). Dear Reader: The Conscripted Audience in Nineteenth-Century British Fiction. Baltimore: Johns Hopkins University Press. ISBN 978-0801852824.
- Stewart, Garrett (1999). Between Film and Screen: Modernism's Photo Synthesis. Chicago: University of Chicago Press. ISBN 978-0226774114.
- Stewart, Garrett (2006). The Look of Reading: Book, Painting, Text. Chicago: University of Chicago Press. ISBN 978-0226773940.
- Stewart, Garrett (2007). Framed Time: Toward a Postfilmic Cinema. Chicago: University of Chicago Press. ISBN 978-0226774152.
- Stewart, Garrett (2009). Novel Violence: A Narratography of Victorian Fiction. Chicago: University of Chicago Press. ISBN 978-0226774589.
- Stewart, Garrett (2011). Bookwork: Medium to Object to Concept to Art. Chicago: University of Chicago Press. ISBN 978-0226773919.
- Stewart, Garrett (2015). Closed Circuits: Screening Narrative Surveillance. Chicago: University of Chicago Press. ISBN 978-0226201214.
- Stewart, Garrett (2015). The Deed of Reading: Literature * Writing * Language * Philosophy. Ithaca, NY: Cornell University Press. ISBN 978-0801454219.
- Stewart, Garrett (2017). Transmedium: Conceptualism 2.0 and the New Object Art. Chicago: University of Chicago Press. ISBN 978-0226500874.
- Stewart, Garrett (2018). The Value of Style in Fiction. Cambridge: Cambridge University Press. ISBN 978-1107193857.
- Stewart, Garrett (2018). The One, Other, and Only Dickens. Ithaca, NY: Cornell University Press. ISBN 9781501730108.
- Stewart, Garrett (2020). Book, Text, Medium: Cross-Sectional Reading for a Digital Age. Cambridge: Cambridge University Press. ISBN 978-1108834599.
- Stewart, Garrett (2020). Cinemachines: An Essay on Media and Method. Chicago: University of Chicago Press. ISBN 978-0226656564.
- Stewart, Garrett (2021). Cinesthesia: Museum Cinema and the Curated Screen. Montreal: caboose (Kino-Agora series). ISBN 978-1927852095.
- Stewart, Garrett (2022). The Ways of the Word: Episodes in Verbal Attention. Ithaca, NY: Cornell University Press. ISBN 978-1501761393.
- Stewart, Garrett (2022). The Metanarrative Hall of Mirrors: Reflex Action in Fiction and Film. New York: Bloomsbury Academic. ISBN 978-1501388798.
- Stewart, Garrett (2023). Streisand: The Mirror of Difference. Queer Screens. Detroit: Wayne State University Press. ISBN 978-0814349083.

Anthologies

- LaRocca, David, ed. (2024). Attention Spans: Garrett Stewart, a Reader. New York: Bloomsbury Academic. ISBN 979-8765102220.
- LaRocca, David, ed. (2025). Bandwidths: Reading Across Media with Garrett Stewart. New York: Bloomsbury Academic. ISBN 979-8765112991.
- LaRocca, David, ed. (2025). Closer Reading: Garrett Stewart's Essays in Refraction. New York: Bloomsbury Academic. ISBN 979-8765140277.

Selected articles

- Stewart, Garrett (1976). "Modern Hard Times: Chaplin and the Cinema of Self-Reflection". Critical Inquiry. 3 (2): 295–314. doi:10.1086/447890.
- Stewart, Garrett (1980). "Lying as Dying in Heart of Darkness". PMLA. 95 (3): 319–331.
- Stewart, Garrett (1981). "Coppola's Conrad: The Repetitions of Complicity". Critical Inquiry. 7 (3): 455–474. doi:10.1086/448110.
- Stewart, Garrett (2009). "Digital Fatigue: Imaging War in Recent American Film". Film Quarterly. 62 (4): 45–55. doi:10.1525/fq.2009.62.4.45.
- Stewart, Garrett (2010). "Bookwork as Demediation". Critical Inquiry. 36 (3): 410–457. doi:10.1086/653407.
- Stewart, Garrett (2021). "Organic Reformations in Richard Powers's The Overstory". Daedalus. 150 (1): 160–177. doi:10.1162/daed_a_01840.
