= Cecilia Clare Bocard =

American musician, composer, nun (1899–1994)

Sister Cecilia Clare Bocard, S.P.
- Born: Frances Ada Bocard; April 13, 1899; New Albany, Indiana
- Died: February 15, 1994 (aged 94); Saint Mary-of-the-Woods, Indiana
- Occupations: Religious Sister, organist, composer and music teacher

Sister Cecilia Clare Bocard, S.P., (April 13, 1899 – February 15, 1994) was an American musician and composer of works for organ, piano, and chorus.

Born Frances Ada Bocard in New Albany, Indiana, she began studying piano in first grade and organ in third grade. Bocard began as her parish's organist at the early age of nine. She entered the Sisters of Providence of Saint Mary-of-the-Woods in 1916 at the age of 17, taking the religious name Sister Cecilia Clare. In addition to her composing work, Bocard taught piano, organ, composition and theory at Saint Mary-of-the-Woods College Conservatory of Music for 47 years. Beginning in 1970, she served as organist at the Church of the Immaculate Conception until her death in 1994. She is buried in the Sisters of Providence Convent Cemetery.

== Education ==
Bocard earned a bachelor's degree in composition and orchestration at Bush Conservatory of Music beginning in 1923 and went on to earn her master's degree in composition there in 1925. She also studied liturgical music at the St. Pius X School of Liturgical Music of Manhattanville College of the Sacred Heart in New York in 1935, composition and piano at Northwestern University 1936–37, and Gregorian chant at Solesmes Abbey in France in 1961. In 1961 she also attended the Fourth International Congress on Catholic Church Music at Cologne, Germany. Throughout her years as a composer and organist, Bocard ended up studying under musicians including Wilhelm Middelschulte, Edgar Brazelton, Arne Oldberg, Moissaye Boguslawski, Arnold Schultz and Nadia Boulanger.

== Works and honors ==
Some of her well-known religious compositions include A Cycle of Psalms, written in 1956 and performed by the Sisters of Providence Choir in 1965 at the Chicago Civic Opera House; the organ work "Te Deum Laudamus" (1952); the hymn "Our Lady of Providence"; and the five-volume work Propers for the Mass for Sundays and Feast Days. She also composed a two-act opera called Cleft in the Rock. Her Mass in Honor of Divine Providence won first place in the 1955 Nemmers Memorial National Contest. Not all of her works were religious; other tunes include "Kaifeng", "Goblins", and "Wings of a hummingbird flashing by". She also received several awards in contests of the Indiana Composers' Guild, including first prize in 1942 and second prize in 1944.

Several of Bocard's works appear on the 1964 record In God's Providence, released by the Sisters of Providence Choir of Sisters. She also served as organist for this album.

As a music educator, Bocard also wrote on the subject and was published in several music education journals.

Bocard was awarded professor emerita status at Saint Mary-of-the-Woods College in 1971, and received an honorary Doctor of Letters degree from them in 1983. She is known to alumnae for her "Saint Mary-of-the-Woods Wedding March." In 1987, the 105th session of the Indiana House of Representatives honored Bocard for "her contributions to the fields of Education and Music" through House Resolution #49. That same year she was honored by the Archdiocese of Indianapolis for her contributions to overall Catholic education.
