= Henry G. Lykken =

American inventor (1880–1958)

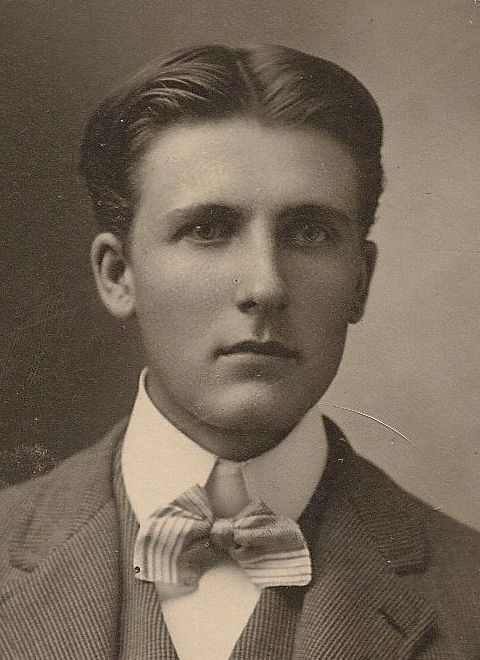
H.G. Lykken, 1902

Henry G. Lykken (December 9, 1880 – April 5, 1958) was an American civil engineer and inventor who is credited with invention of: emergency tires, pneumatic grain elevators, coal pulverizers, and the original flour milling equipment adopted by Pillsbury Mills.

Henry G. Lykken was born in Dakota County, Minnesota and raised in Walsh County, North Dakota. He was the eldest of nine children born to Gilman Lykken (1854 - 1939), who emigrated from Telemark, Norway and Ella (Thoreson) Lykken (1860 - 1953). He was the father of David T. Lykken and grandfather of Joseph Lykken.

Lykken graduated from the University of North Dakota in 1905 with the B.A. degree and M.E. degree in 1906 in mining engineering. In 1958, his alma mater awarded him an honorary Doctor of Engineering degree. He was an inductee of Minnesota Inventors Hall of Fame of 1978.
