= Votaw =

Votaw is a surname. Notable people with the surname include:

- Carmen Delgado Votaw
- Carolyn Harding Votaw (1879–1951), American missionary and public servant
- Lyravine Votaw (1874–1958), American music educator
- Ty Votaw (born 1962), American lawyer and golf administrator

== See also ==
- Votaw, Texas, unincorporated community in the United States
