= Bush Conservatory of Music =

Defunct music conservatory based in Chicago, Illinois, U.S.

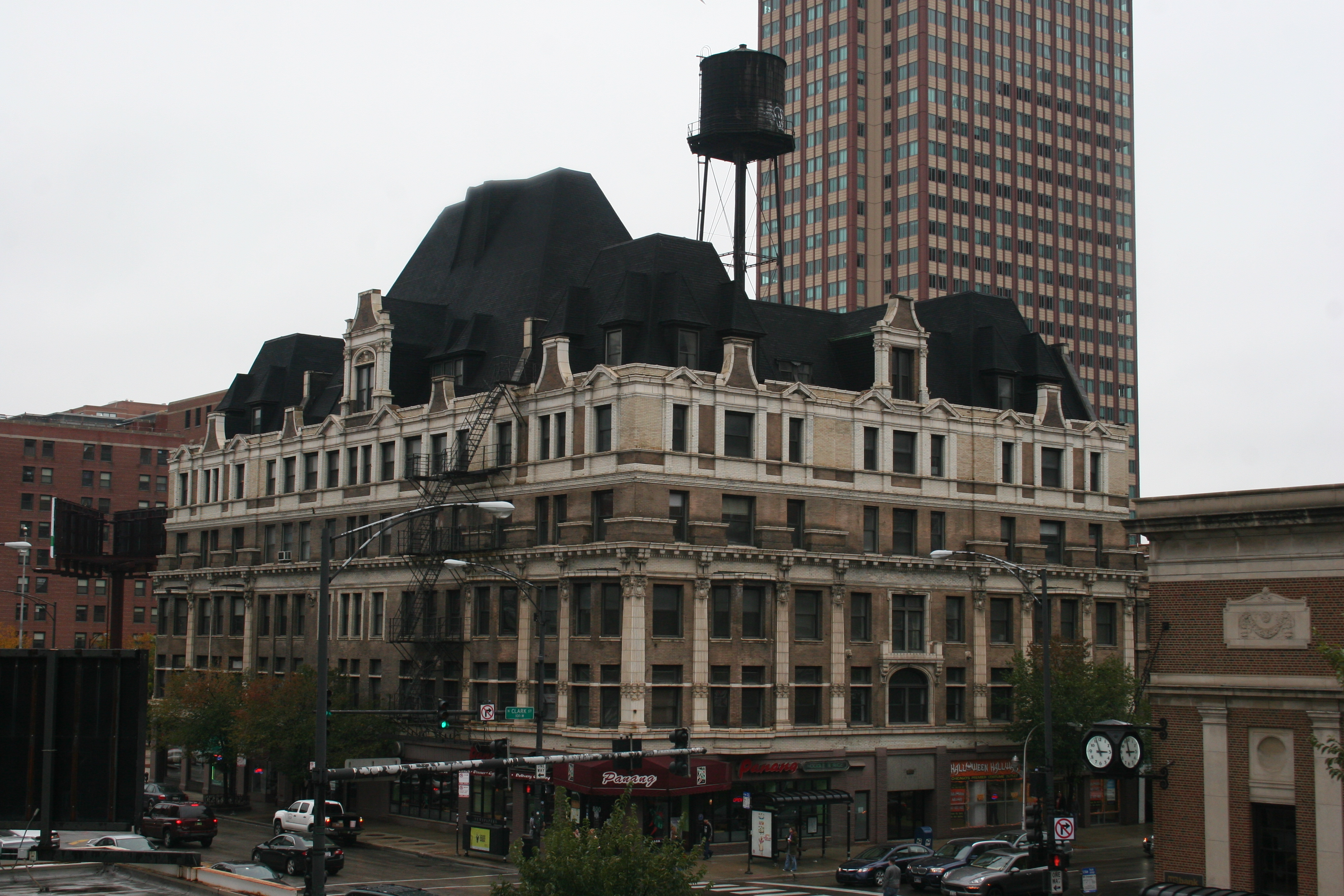
- Original building in Chicago at N. Clark & Chicago circa 2012
- Chicago; Dallas; Memphis

Information
- Type: Private
- Established: 1901
- Closed: 1932
- Campus: Urban

The Bush Temple Conservatory of Music and Dramatic Art was an American conservatory of music based in Chicago with branches in Dallas and Memphis.

== History ==
The Conservatory was founded in 1901 by William Lincoln Bush (1861–1941), of the Chicago-based piano manufacturer and retailer, Bush & Gerts Piano Company, a company that he co-founded as W. H. Bush and Company in 1885 with (i) his father, William H. Bush, and (ii) a noted, German-born piano-maker, John Gerts (1845–1913).

Bush Temple of Music, Chicago
Northwest corner of North Clark Street and Chicago Avenue

The building was a 6-story, early French Renaissance design by British-American Chicago architect John Edmund Oldaker Pridmore (1864–1940) featuring a buff brick and terra cotta exterior. The Building originally had a clock tower and included a showroom for the Bush and Gerts Piano Company, the Bush Temple Conservatory of Music, the Bush Temple Theatre, a museum, and offices. The building was designated a Chicago landmark in 2001.
Facing a decline in interest in music education, The Bush Temple Conservatory moved to smaller quarters at 839 N. Dearborn St. in 1918. Constructed in 1878, this building was previously home to Grant's Seminary for Young Ladies (Grant Collegiate Institute) and Arlington Hotel.

Bush Temple of Music, Memphis, gave its inaugural concert on January 28, 1905.

Bush Temple of Music, Dallas was located at 307 Elm Street. It was opened in 1903 and managed by William Hayes Wray (1869–1943), who served as President of Bush and Gerts of Texas for twenty-five years. The building, formerly known as the "March Building", was a four-story structure – formerly the Fakes Furniture Store – that was purchased in 1902 by Mars Nearing Baker (1854–1941) from Col. Stephen Ellis Moss (1853–1942). Its auditorium, occupying the second and third floors, had a seating capacity of 1,500. The remodeling was designed by Sanguinet & Staats.

Bush was treasurer of the Conservatory and also president of the Bush & Gerts Piano Company of Texas and the Bush Temple of Music in Dallas. Bush & Gerts had branches in Boston, Dallas, Austin, and Memphis.

The conservatory flourished since its founding and was the first music conservatory in Chicago to provide dormitories for out-of-state students. In 1924, The Bush Conservatory was one of six institutions that founded the National Association of Schools of Music and Kenneth McPherson Bradley, president of the Bush Conservatory, served as its founding president from 1924 to 1928.

The conservatory's name ceased to exist in 1932 because – thirty-three months after the Wall Street crash of 1929 and under financial duress of the ensuing Great Depression – it merged with the Chicago Conservatory College.

== Presidents ==
Chicago Temple Conservatory

- Kenneth McPherson Bradley (1872–1954) stepped down as president of the Bush Conservatory in October 1925 to become director of the Juilliard Foundation in New York. He was the nephew of the former governor of Kentucky, William O'Connell Bradley.
- Edgar Andrew Nelson (1882–1957), a choral director and oratory coach, and vice president at the Bush Conservatory, was appointed president in October 1925, replacing Bradley. Nelson was of Swedish descent. He had studied piano with Emil Larson and, later, Harald von Mickwitz. He also studied organ with Clarence Dickinson. In 1908, Nelson earned a Bachelor of Music from the Bush Conservatory and subsequently was appointed assistant managing director of the conservatory. Nelson went on to serve as president of the Chicago Conservatory after the Bush Conservatory merged with it in 1932.

== Noted faculty and alumni ==
Faculty, Bush Conservatory, Chicago

- Jeanne Boyd
- 1921–1932 – Jan Chiapusso, piano
- Grace Potter Carroll (1883–1978)
- Charles W. Clark, baritone, head of the vocal department
- Fannie Bloomfield Zeisler, head of the piano department
- Frederic Lamond, guest artist who held several master classes
- Harriet Lundgren (1907–1996)
- Edgar Nelson
- Moissaye Boguslawski, piano
- Harald von Mickwitz
- Richard Rudolph Czerwonky (1886–1949), violinist
- Edgar Albert Brazelton (1875–1953), a pianist and theory teacher, eventually became Dean of the Chicago Conservatory of Music, after the merger
- Sergei Tarnowsky
- Herbert Miller
- John J. Blackmore
- Mae Graves Atkins, soprano
- Agnes Pringle, a violinist who had studied with Leopold Auer
- Jeanette Lamden, vocalist
- Ebba Sundstrom Nylander (1896–1963), violinist and conductor
- Olga von Türk-Rohn (1865–1940), soprano and voice teacher
- Lyravine Votaw, head of the School Music department in the 1920s

Faculty, Bush Conservatory, Memphis

- Frieda Siemens (pseudonym for Simonson; 1889–1969), pianist & director of the piano department. On July 27, 1905, Frieda married James Francis Bliss (1878–1928) in Manhattan, New York City. He was a dental surgeon from Springfield, Massachusetts.
- Marie Greenwood-Guiberson (née Mary Susan Greenwood; 1864–1954), head of the vocal department. She was married to William P. Guiberson, and later to Edmond Smither Worden (1877–1949)

Alumni, Bush Conservatory, Chicago

- Jane Jarvis
- Baylus Benjamin McKinney
- Harold Newton
- Gladys Swarthout
- Larry Shay
- Harold Triggs
- Pearl White (organist)
- Elsie Vieweger, vocalist
