= B. B. McKinney =

Baylus McKinney
- Also known as: B. B. McKinney
- Born: Baylus Benjamin McKinney; July 22, 1886; Heflin, Webster Parish; Louisiana, USA
- Died: September 7, 1952 (aged 66)
- Genres: Gospel
- Occupation(s): Singer, song writer, teacher, and music editor

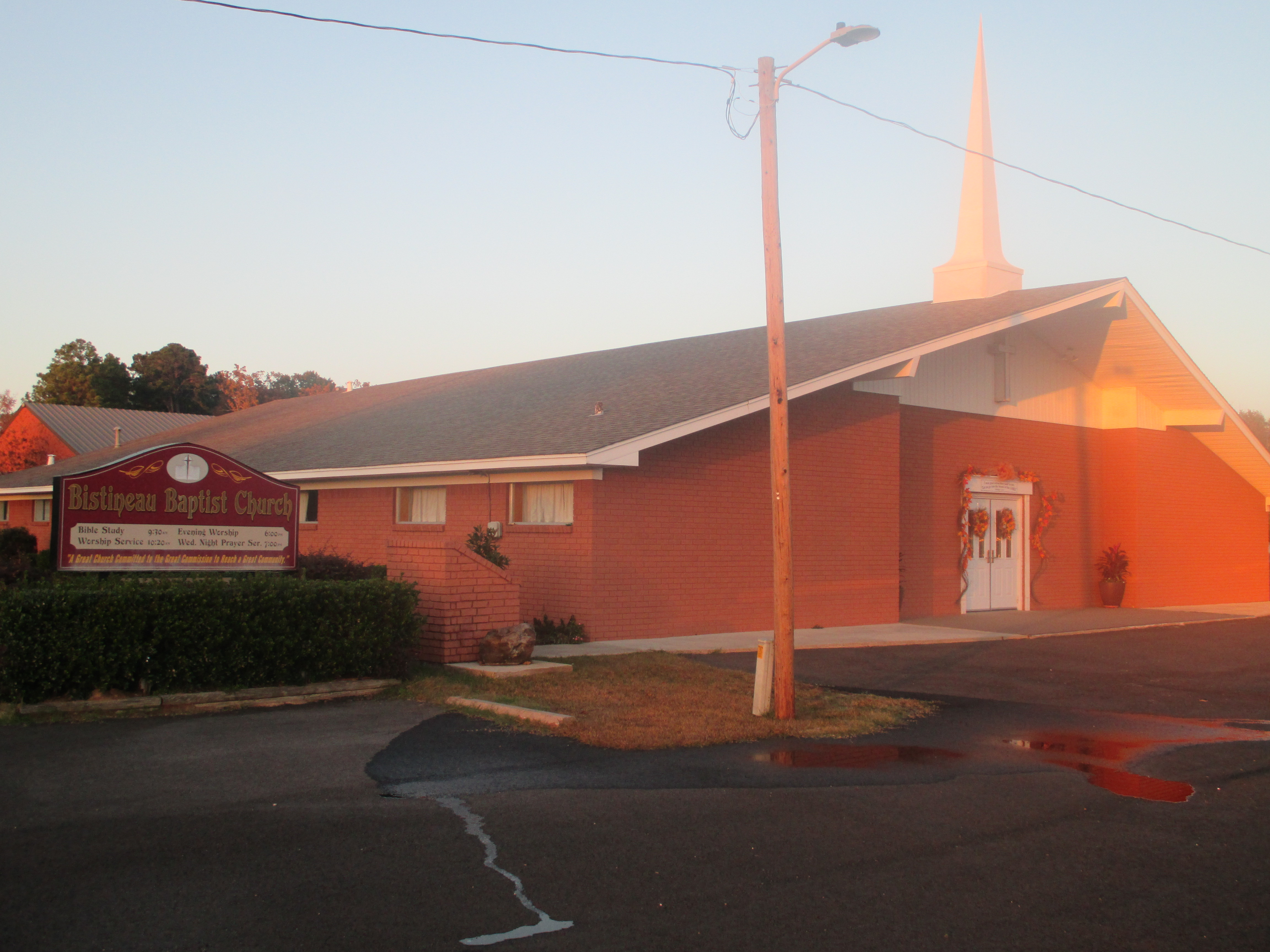
Bistineau Baptist Church near Heflin, Louisiana, was McKinney's home congregation.

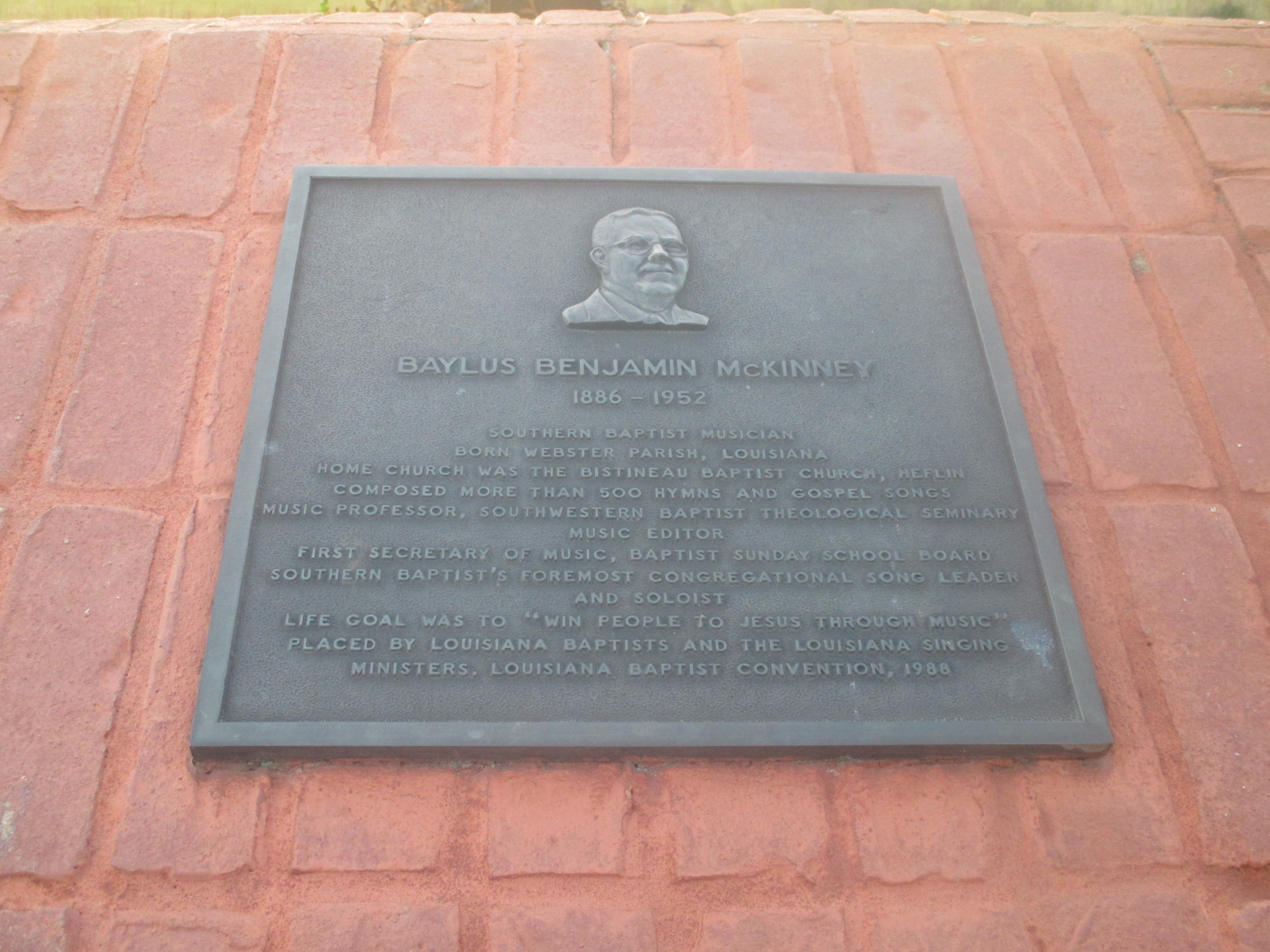
McKinney historical marker at Bistineau Baptist Church in south Webster Parish, Louisiana; click to enlarge.

Baylus Benjamin McKinney or B. B. McKinney (July 22, 1886 – September 7, 1952), was an American singer, song writer, teacher, and music editor.

== Biography ==
McKinney was a native of rural Heflin in south Webster Parish in northwestern Louisiana. He was an alumnus of Louisiana College in Pineville, Southwestern Baptist Theological Seminary in Fort Worth, Texas, and the Siegel-Myers School of Music and the Bush Conservatory of Music, both in Chicago, Illinois.

McKinney wrote the words and music to 149 hymns and gospel songs. His most famous are "The Nail Scarred Hand" (1924), "Let Others See Jesus in You" (1924), "Satisfied with Jesus" (1926), "Speak to My Heart" (1927), "'Neath the Old Olive Trees" (1934), "Breathe on Me" (1937), and "Wherever He Leads I'll Go" (1937). He was also the editor of the widely-used Broadman Hymnal (1940, Nashville).

B.B. McKinney Chapel (which was demolished in 2003-2004 for the construction of the new R.A. Young Tabernacle) was on the grounds of Falls Creek Baptist Encampment in Davis, Oklahoma, it was named in his honor. He was posthumously inducted into the Gospel Music Hall of Fame in 1982.
