= Moissaye Boguslawski =

American pianist and educator (1887–1944)

Background information
- Born: Moses Boguslawski; November 1, 1887; Chicago, Illinois, U.S.
- Died: August 30, 1944 (aged 56)
- Genres: classical
- Occupation(s): pianist, composer, editor, teacher
- Instrument: piano
- Years active: 1908–1944

Moissaye Boguslawski (born Moses Boguslawski; November 1, 1887 – August 30, 1944) was an American pianist, composer, editor and teacher. Sometimes known as Bogie.

== Biography ==
Boguslawski was born in Chicago in 1887 to a Ukrainian Jewish family with significant musical background. His parents, Afram "Frank" Boguslawski and Anna Nemkovsky, emigrated in the 1880s. His father was a music teacher, flutist and orchestra leader from Poltava who served in the Tsar's army during the Russo-Turkish War (1877–78). His cousin Sol Nemkovsky was a noted violinist.

Despite the family's poverty, Boguslawski began piano lessons at age 4 and began playing in public at weddings at the age of 10. By age 15, he was performing at a dance hall in Chicago. He also studied briefly with Rudolph Ganz.

Boguslawski was named head of the piano department at the Kansas City Conservatory of Music when he was 20 years old. Recitals given during this time established him as a well-known pianist, and in 1916 a trip to the East Coast earned him good reviews in New York and Boston. Soon he was a sought-after performer both in concert and as a recorded radio performer. He performed with various orchestras and performers, including Emma Calvé and Antonio Scotti. For Chicago's WJJD radio station (now WYLL), Boguslawski played all of Bach's piano music and all of the sonatas of Beethoven, taking a total of 21 weeks to accomplish. He was a professor of piano at Chicago Musical College and at the Bush Conservatory of Music; later he was head of the Boguslawski College of Music., where students included Cecilia Clare Bocard.

Later in his career, Boguslawski composed pieces of his own, including a comprehensive set of children's teaching pieces with publisher M. M. Cole. Compositions include Hungarian Rhapsodie No. 1, Valse Russe, Frog's Frolic, and Overture to a Carnival.

Boguslawski was known for skillfully attracting media attention. A 1936 piece in TIME magazine said of him, "When straight news about himself is scarce, 'Bogie' is likely to come forth with such a project as his proposal to promote world peace through voice culture, since animosity arises when unpleasant tones are heard." Whatever his motivation, Boguslawski did influence the fields of music psychology and music therapy, contributing his theories about curing antisocial behavior and memory loss.
