= David T. Lykken =

American behavioral geneticist (1928–2006)

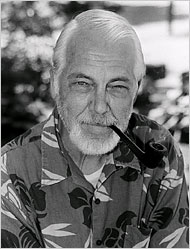
- Born: David Thoreson Lykken; 18 June 1928; Minneapolis, Minnesota, U.S.
- Died: 15 September 2006 (aged 78)
- Education: University of Minnesota (BA, MA, PhD)
- Known for: Twin studies, lie detection, set-point theory of happiness
- Scientific career
- Fields: Psychology, behavioral genetics
- Workplaces: University of Minnesota; Deep Springs College

David Thoreson Lykken (June 18, 1928 – September 15, 2006) was a behavioral geneticist and Professor Emeritus of Psychology and Psychiatry at the University of Minnesota. He is best known for his work on twin studies and lie detection.

== Life ==
Born in Minneapolis, Minnesota, David Lykken was the youngest of seven children born to Henry G. Lykken and his wife Frances. He joined the United States Navy at 17 and then attended University of Minnesota on the G.I. Bill, earning his Bachelor of Arts (psychology, philosophy and mathematics) 1949, his master's degree in psychology and statistics in 1952, and his doctorate in clinical psychology and neuropsychiatry in 1955. He remained on Minnesota's permanent faculty for his entire career and taught as a visiting professor at Deep Springs College. He was an emeritus professor from 1998 until his death. Lykken's wife, wildlife advocate Harriet (Betts) Lykken, died in 2005. Lykken was survived by three sons: attorney Matthew Lykken, physicist Joseph Lykken, and criminologist Jesse Lykken, as well as ten grandchildren.

== Work ==
Lykken was also known for his work on twins, which he began in 1970. He was a principal investigator on the Minnesota Twin Family Study, which examines heritability of certain psychological traits based on evidence found in identical and fraternal twins. He was a signatory of a collective statement in response to The Bell Curve titled "Mainstream Science on Intelligence", written by Intelligence editor Linda Gottfredson and published in The Wall Street Journal in 1994 and in Intelligence in 1997.

Lykken was the proponent of a set-point theory of happiness, which argues that variation in sense of well-being is half determined by genetics and half determined by circumstances, and has been the subject of international media attention. His research findings suggest that variation in baseline levels of cheerfulness, contentment, and psychological satisfaction is largely a matter of heredity.

He was also a proponent of introducing a scheme whereby every parent or prospective parent would have to obtain a license in order to have a legal baby, which would depend on the parents being married, financially independent, having no criminal record or debilitating illness, and not being assessed as high in psychopathy or sociopathy.

He was elected a Fellow of the American Psychological Association (Division 1), a Charter Fellow of the American Psychological Society and a Fellow of the American Association for the Advancement of Science. He was also a member of the Behavior Genetics Association and the International Society for Twin Research. Throughout his career, he consulted with government and industry. He frequently testified as an expert witness on polygraph testing and personality assessment in the wake of Daubert standard requirements.

== Funding ==
Some of Lykken's work was funded by the Pioneer fund. An organization founded by Americans sympathetic to Nazi policy on eugenics which openly modelled its support of eugenics on the Nazi Lebensborn breeding program, and has often explicitly promoted scientific racism at numerous points in its history up to and including the present. Lykken defended his acceptance of money from the fund, writing "If you can find me some rich villains that want to contribute to my research—Qaddafi, the Mafia, whoever—the worse they are, the better I'll like it. I'm doing a social good by taking their money... Any money of theirs that I spend in a legitimate and honorable way, they can't spend in a dishonorable way". Nevertheless, he has praised the theories of eugenic academics associated with or on the board of the pioneer fund, such as Richard Lynn.

== See also ==
- Henry G. Lykken
- Joseph Lykken
