= Harriet Lundgren =

Chicago Civic Opera prima ballerina (1907–1996)

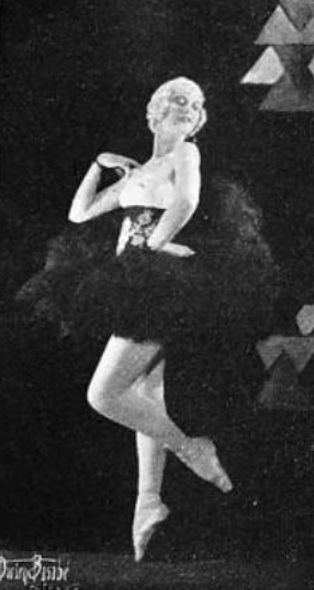
- Harriet Lundgren, from a 1927 publication
- Born: November 20, 1907; Chicago, Illinois, U.S.
- Died: January 1996; Chicago, Illinois, U.S.
- Occupation(s): Ballerina, dance educator

Harriet M. Lundgren (November 20, 1907 – January 1996) was prima ballerina for the Chicago Civic Opera Company from 1922 until 1932. She was also a ballet teacher.

== Early life and education ==
Lundgren was born in Chicago, the daughter of Martin Lundgren and Ida Lundgren. Both of her parents were born in Sweden. As a teenager, she trained with several prominent ballet companies, including the Hazel Wallack Studio, the Pavley-Oukrainsky Ballet, and the Adolph Bolm Company.

== Career ==
In 1925, Lundgren was in the production of The Legend of the Nile with the Civic Opera. She toured in production called A Bird Fantasy in 1926, including at the Palace Theatre in Dallas, Texas and in Kansas City's Newman Theater. She made an appearance as a bird of paradise in the final number of the silent film A Social Celebrity (1926) with Vivian Gonchar, with whom she had toured. In 1927, she joined the faculty of the Bush Conservatory of Music in Chicago.

In 1936, she was announced as the principal dancer with the new Coe Glade touring company. She and her dancers performed in the Glade productions of Rigoletto and Carmen in Duluth, Madison, Sioux City, Minneapolis, and other midwestern cities. Lundgren was one of the principal dancers in the Outdoor Opera of Soldier Field productions of Aida and Il Trovatore in Chicago in 1936.

After her tenure at the opera, Lundgren taught Russian and Italian ballet at the Bush Conservatory, eventually opening her own school in the Edgewater Beach Apartments, which remained open until the 1960s.

== Personal life ==
In 1928, Lundgren was engaged to Chase Baromeo, an American basso singer with the Chicago Civic Opera. Instead, Baromeo married pianist Delphie Lindstrom, in 1931. Lundgren died in 1996, at the age of 88, in Chicago.
