= Heflin, Louisiana =

- Village
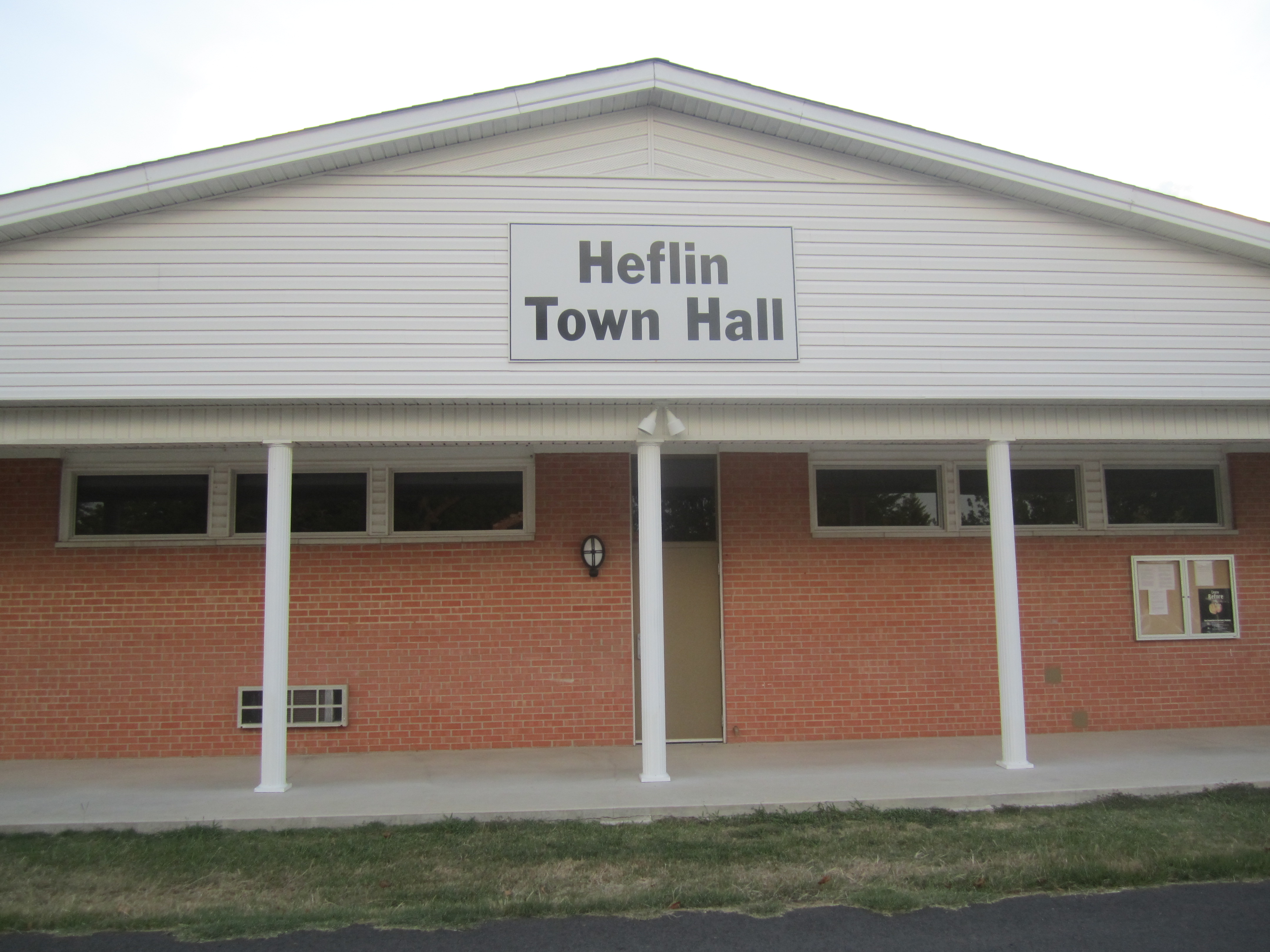
- Heflin Town Hall

- Location of Heflin in Webster Parish, Louisiana.

- Location of Louisiana in the United States
- Coordinates: 32°27′23″N 93°16′06″W
- Country: United States
- State: Louisiana
- Parish: Webster

Area
  - Total: 1.93 sq mi (5.00 km^{2})
  - Land: 1.91 sq mi (4.95 km^{2})
  - Water: 0.019 sq mi (0.05 km^{2})
- Elevation: 272 ft (83 m)

Population (2020)
  - Total: 213
  - Density: 111.3/sq mi (42.99/km^{2})
- Time zone: UTC-6 (CST)
  - Summer (DST): UTC-5 (CDT)
- Area code: 318
- FIPS code: 22-33735
- GNIS feature ID: 2407474

Heflin is a village in southern Webster Parish, Louisiana, United States. As of the 2020 census, Heflin had a population of 213. It is part of the Minden Micropolitan Statistical Area.

== History ==
Heflin is named for Alabama native Charles Buckner Heflin (1829–1910), a veteran of the Confederate Army who thereafter operated a cotton gin and was engaged in the planting and mercantile business in south Webster Parish. Charles Heflin was for eight years a member of the Webster Parish Police Jury, the parish governing body, and the Webster Parish Democratic Executive Committee. He was affiliated with the Masonic lodge. He was the father-in-law of J. S. Bacon, a member from 1926 to 1932 of the Louisiana House of Representatives from Heflin. One of Charles Heflin's sons, William Thomas Heflin (1868–1936), a native of Webster Parish, was engaged in the timber business and was elected in 1916 as the sheriff of Winn Parish in North Louisiana.

On April 5, 2013, voters by a margin of 50-30 recalled Mayor Judy Tillman, a Democrat, from office. No candidate qualified to fill the mayor's office in a special election scheduled for October 19. When filing reopened, the Republican Ralph Lee James (born February 1956) filed for mayor without opposition in the October 19 election.

== Geography ==
According to the United States Census Bureau, the village has a total area of 2.0 square miles (5.2 km^{2}), of which 2.0 square miles (5.2 km^{2}) is land and 0.50% is water.

== Demographics ==
Historical population
| Census | Pop. | Note | %± |
|---|---|---|---|
| 1960 | 289 | | — |
| 1970 | 314 | | 8.7% |
| 1980 | 279 | | −11.1% |
| 1990 | 253 | | −9.3% |
| 2000 | 245 | | −3.2% |
| 2010 | 244 | | −0.4% |
| 2020 | 213 | | −12.7% |
| 2025 (est.) | 204 | ▼ | −4.2% |
U.S. Decennial Census

As of the census of 2000, there were 245 people, 95 households, and 70 families residing in the village. The population density was 123.4 inhabitants per square mile (47.6/km^{2}). There were 104 housing units at an average density of 52.4 per square mile (20.2/km^{2}). The racial makeup of the village was 89.39% White, 8.98% African American, 0.41% Native American, 0.41% Asian, and 0.82% from two or more races. Hispanic or Latino of any race were 0.82% of the population.

There were 95 households, out of which 35.8% had children under the age of 18 living with them, 64.2% were married couples living together, 9.5% had a female householder with no husband present, and 25.3% were non-families. 24.2% of all households were made up of individuals, and 14.7% had someone living alone who was 65 years of age or older. The average household size was 2.58 and the average family size was 3.08.

In the village, the population was spread out, with 26.9% under the age of 18, 8.2% from 18 to 24, 27.8% from 25 to 44, 20.4% from 45 to 64, and 16.7% who were 65 years of age or older. The median age was 37 years. For every 100 females, there were 105.9 males. For every 100 females age 18 and over, there were 98.9 males.

The median income for a household in the village was $33,333, and the median income for a family was $47,083. Males had a median income of $29,167 versus $19,500 for females. The per capita income for the village was $13,547. About 5.7% of families and 8.9% of the population were below the poverty line, including 15.9% of those under the age of eighteen and 5.2% of those 65 or over.

== Notable people ==
- David B. Bolen, track and field athlete and diplomat
- Baylus Benjamin McKinney, composed 149 Christian hymns
