= Rosalyn Tureck =

Background information
- Born: December 14, 1913; Chicago, Illinois, U.S.
- Died: July 17, 2003 (aged 89) Riverdale, Bronx, New York, U.S.
- Genre: classical
- Instruments: piano; harpsichord
- Years active: 1926-1999

Rosalyn Tureck (December 14, 1913 – July 17, 2003) was an American pianist and harpsichordist who was particularly associated with the music of Johann Sebastian Bach. However, she had a wide-ranging repertoire that included works by composers Ludwig van Beethoven, Johannes Brahms and Frédéric Chopin, as well as more modern composers such as David Diamond, Luigi Dallapiccola and William Schuman. Diamond's Piano Sonata No. 1 was inspired by Tureck's playing. She was one of the great pianists of the 20th Century and she is also known as the High Priestess of Bach.

== Biography ==
Tureck was born in Chicago, Illinois, the third of three daughters of Russian Jewish immigrants Samuel Tureck (né Turk; Rosalyn's father was of Turkish descent) and Monya (Lipson) Tureck. She was the granddaughter of a cantor from Kiev. The first of her teachers to recognize her special gifts for playing the music of Bach was the Javanese-born Dutch pianist Jan Chiapusso, who gave her twice-weekly lessons in Chicago from 1929 to 1931 and also introduced her to the sounds of exotic instruments and ensembles such as the Javanese gamelan.

At Tuley High School (closed 1974), Tureck was a friend and classmate of future Nobel Prize–winning novelist Saul Bellow, who graduated in January 1932. The two remained in contact for decades.

"My technique was grounded, from my earliest years of study, in the school of Mendelssohn as passed on by Anton Rubinstein and many of his pupils, one of whom, Sophia Brilliant-Liven, was my teacher. It's essentially a finger technique, not a chordal one." Tureck reports that Brilliant-Liven was a stern teacher. "During the years I was with her, from the ages of 9 to 13, she never praised my playing." However, she made up for this, Tureck said, with a single compliment given to 13-year old Tureck after her performance in the semi-finals of a piano competition in which 80,000 young pianists participated. Brilliant-Liven told young Tureck, "If I had been listening from outside the auditorium, I would have sworn it was Anton Rubinstein himself playing." Tureck went on to the finals, and to win first prize in the competition.

She continued her musical studies in Chicago with pianist and harpsichordist Gavin Williamson. She later studied at the Juilliard School in New York City, where one of her teachers was Leon Theremin. She made her debut at Carnegie Hall playing the electronic instrument invented by Theremin, the eponymously named theremin. In 1937, Tureck gave a six-week series of all-Bach recitals entirely from memory at New York's Town Hall. Her repertoire featured major works including the complete Well-Tempered Clavier, Goldberg Variations, Partitas, French and English Suites, Italian Concerto, and other works by Bach.

In 1940, Tureck joined the piano faculty of the Mannes School of Music. Later in her career, she joined the faculty at Juilliard as a teacher.

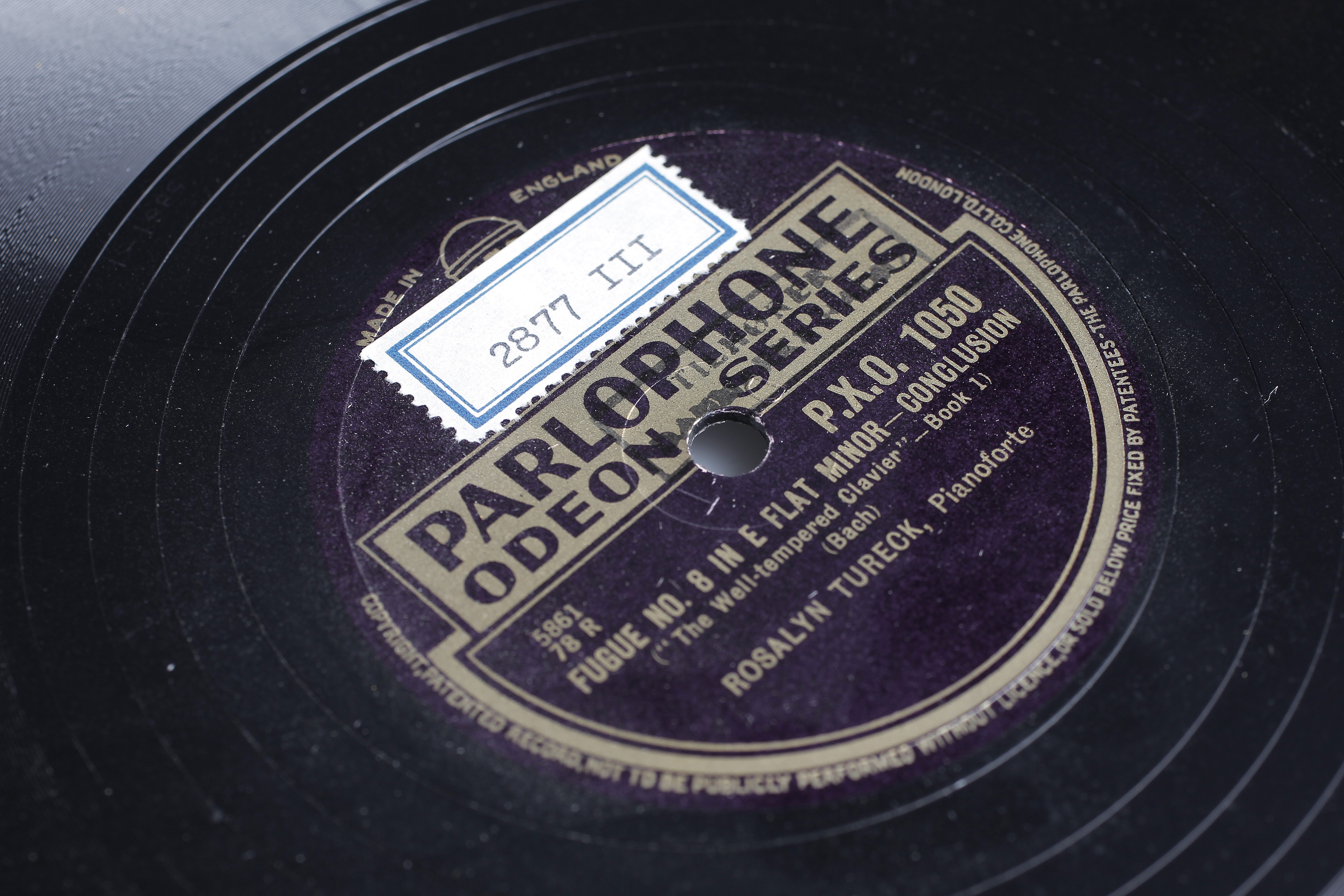
Tureck recording of Bach, Parlophone Records

She was hired to teach at the University of California, San Diego in 1966. She proposed opening a Bach institute on campus. Instead, Muir College Provost John Stewart kept the focus on avant garde music of the 20th century, and Tureck's Bach project never began. She left UCSD a few years after that.

For a while she followed Wanda Landowska in playing Bach's keyboard music on a harpsichord but later returned to playing the piano. In 1970, Tureck performed in Boston for the Peabody Mason Concert series. She was an honorary fellow of St Hilda's College, Oxford.

Author William F. Buckley, a friend of Tureck's, when writing in his magazine National Review often called her "J.S. Bach's representative on Earth".

In a CBC radio special on Glenn Gould, the host told Tureck that Gould cited her as his "only" influence. He recalled: "It was playing of such uprightness, to put it into that moral sphere."

On March 18, 1986, she played during the state dinner hosted by President Ronald Reagan.

In 1990 she served on the jury of the Paloma O'Shea Santander International Piano Competition.

During 2000 and 2001, Tureck lived in Spain teaching and practicing every day of the week, specifically in Estepona, Málaga, where she remained for a year in retirement.

Tureck was among the founders of the Music Academy of the West summer conservatory in 1947.

She died at her home in Riverdale, New York City in 2003, aged 89. Her scores and recordings were given to the Music Division and the Rodgers & Hammerstein Archives of Recorded Sound, both divisions of the New York Public Library for the Performing Arts.

== Political and social activism ==
Tureck opposed apartheid in South Africa. In 1960, she cancelled a planned concert tour in protest against racial segregation. In 1975, she also supported a cultural boycott of South Africa, despite acknowledging its potential impact on cultural exchanges.
