= Darrel Waggoner =

- Born: 1966 (age 59–60); Nashville, Tennessee, US
- Education: MD, Washington University in St. Louis
- Occupation: Clinical Geneticist
- Employer: University of Chicago
- Spouse(s): Lisa Vinci, MD

Darrel Waggoner (born 1966) is a professor of human genetics and pediatrics at the Pritzker School of Medicine, and is the director of Human Genetics at University of Chicago.

== Life and education ==
Darrel Waggoner was born in Nashville, TN. He was the first person in his family to attend college and attended Saint Louis University where he studied chemistry. When he decided to matriculate into Washington University School of Medicine his father "didn't believe him at first".

After graduating from medical school, Waggoner pursued a residency in Pediatrics at the University of Chicago where he became chief resident.

== Research ==
Waggoner researches genetic conditions and is currently working with Dr. Carole Ober studying clinic phenotypes of Hutterites.
