= Jan Chiapusso =

Dutch-American classical pianist

- Born: Jan Joseph Chiapusso; 2 February 1890; Gemou, Java, Dutch East Indies
- Died: 21 August 1969 (aged 79); Lawrence, Kansas, U.S.
- Education: Cologne Conservatory
- Occupations: Classical pianist and teacher
- Spouse: Beulah C. Hollingsworth (m. 1934)

Jan Joseph Chiapusso (2 February 1890 – 21 August 1969) was a Dutch, later American, classical pianist and teacher. He was a student of Frederic Lamond and Raoul Pugno, and he was the teacher of Rosalyn Tureck, among others.

== Biography ==
Jan Joseph Chiapusso was born in Gemou, near Semarang, in Java in the Dutch East Indies, now Indonesia. His parents were Dutch, but the last name Chiapusso is of Italian origin. When he was six months old, his parents relocated to the city of Nijmegen in the Netherlands.

He entered the Cologne Conservatory in 1907, graduating in 1911. He had further training with Frederic Lamond and Raoul Pugno.

He arrived in the United States in 1916, where he gave concerts and was Professor of Piano (1916–1917) at Shorter College in Rome, Georgia. He taught at the Bush Conservatory of Music in Chicago 1921–31, interrupting this in 1927 to tour Europe as a performer. On return to the United States he taught at the University of Chicago 1932–34, and from 1934 at the University of Kansas, retiring in 1960. He then returned to concertising, giving lecture tours he called "Tone Picture Recitals". In these talks he would illustrate the influence of the gamelan and other types of Javanese music on European composers, drawing on his own experiences and his family's knowledge.

While Chiapusso was at the Bush Conservatory, he taught Rosalyn Tureck from 1929 to 1931, and was the first of her teachers to recognise her special gifts for playing the music of Johann Sebastian Bach. He also introduced her to the sounds of Indonesian, Asian and African instruments.

Chiapusso himself was a fervent advocate of Bach's music, and wrote a book called Bach's World, published by Indiana University Press in 1968, the year before he died.

He died in 1969, in Lawrence, Kansas, aged 79. His wife (the former Beulah C. Hollingsworth, a soprano and music instructor, whom he married in 1934) predeceased him, and he had no children.

He made a few recordings, including some on Ampico piano rolls. Extant recordings available on CD include:

- Frédéric Chopin, Étude in E minor, Op. 25, No. 5
- Franz Liszt, Transcendental Étude No. 8 in C minor, "Wilde Jagd". The Liszt work appeared on a three-LP compilation called "The Golden Age of Piano Virtuosi".

He also published his own piano arrangements of some Bach organ and solo cello works.
