= Marcela Carena =

Argentine theoretical physicist

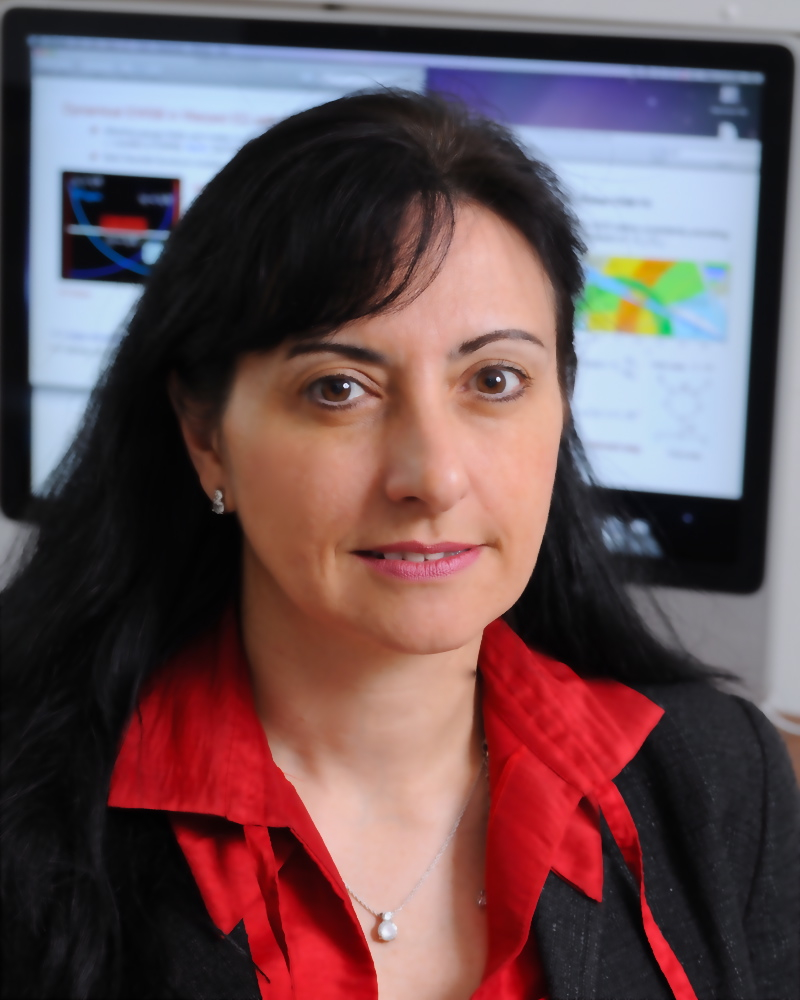
- Born: Buenos Aires, Argentina
- Citizenship: Argentina; Italy; United States
- Education: Balseiro Institute; University of Hamburg
- Known for: Theory and phenomenology of the Higgs boson, supersymmetry, and electroweak baryogenesis; quantum simulation for particle physics.
- Scientific career
- Fields: Particle physics
- Workplaces: Perimeter Institute for Theoretical Physics; other affiliations: University of Chicago, Fermilab
- Doctoral advisor: Roberto Peccei

Marcela Silvia Carena Lopez is an Argentine theoretical physicist, and since November 2024 the executive director of the Perimeter Institute for Theoretical Physics in Waterloo, ON, Canada. Prior to taking this position she was a Distinguished Scientist at the Fermi National Accelerator Laboratory in Batavia, Illinois, where she was Director of the lab's Theory Division. She is also a professor at the University of Chicago, where she is a member of the Enrico Fermi Institute and the Kavli Institute for Cosmological Physics.

== Early life and education ==
Marcela Carena was born in Buenos Aires, Argentina, and grew up in the Villa Urquiza neighborhood. An only child, her father was an Italian immigrant who had immigrated to Argentina in the early 20th century, and her mother came from a Spanish family who had previously immigrated to Argentina.

Carena initially studied engineering at the Instituto Tecnológico de Buenos Aires, then studied philosophy at the University of Buenos Aires, and finally received her diploma in physics from the Instituto Balseiro in Bariloche, Argentina in 1985. That same year, at the encouragement of Robert Peccei, Carena was offered a position at the University of Hamburg and at the DESY Laboratory. Carena received her PhD in high energy physics from the University of Hamburg in 1989.

== Career ==
After the completion of her PhD, Carena began a postdoctoral appointment at Purdue University, where she worked with William Bardeen. She then returned to Germany for another postdoc position at the Max Planck Institute for Physics in Munich, Germany. In 1993, she went to CERN in Geneva, Switzerland, as a John Stewart Bell Fellow.

After three years at CERN, Carena was hired by Fermilab in an associate scientist position, and was later promoted to a full tenured scientist role. At Fermilab, Carena originated a visitor program which brings students from Latin America to Fermilab to pursue research projects with Fermilab theoretical physicists as part of their graduate education. In 2008, she began a formal teaching position at the University of Chicago.

Carena was a general councilor of the American Physical Society (APS); chair of the Division of Particle and Fields of APS; and a member of the APS Committee on International Scientific Affairs. She is currently Chair-elect of the APS Forum on International Physics. Carena is a former chair of the DPF Nominating Committee. She served on the Particle Physics Project Prioritization Panel (P5) of the U.S. DOE/NSF High Energy Physics Advisory Panel (HEPAP). From 2004 through 2019, Carena was a member of the Aspen Center for Physics.

In 2021 she was appointed as a member of the Argentinian Academy of Exact, Physical, and Natural Sciences. In 2022 she received the Distinguished Scientist Fellow award from the U.S. Dept. of Energy Office of Science.

Carena frequently delivers public lectures. She was featured in the 2008 documentary film The Atom Smashers.

== Research ==
Carena's research is focused on models of new physics beyond the Standard Model and their manifestations in particle physics experiments, including on topics such as Higgs physics, supersymmetry, dark matter, and electroweak baryogenesis. Since 2018 she is the principal investigator of a national consortium developing methods to achieve quantum simulation of foundational problems in particle physics. This research is supported by the QuantISED program of the U.S. Dept. of Energy Office of High Energy Physics.

== Awards ==
- John Stewart Bell Fellow at CERN, 1993–95
- Marie Curie Fellow, 1996
- American Physical Society Fellow since 2002
- Research Award from the Alexander von Humboldt Foundation, 2013
- Simons Distinguished Visiting Scholar at the Kavli Institute for Theoretical Physics, 2013
- 2022 Distinguished Scientist Fellow award from the U.S. Dept. of Energy Office of Science.

== Personal life ==
Carena married theoretical physicist Carlos E.M. Wagner in 1985. They have two children.

== Publications ==
- Dr. Carena's publications on the INSPIRE-HEP Literature Database .
- Articles by Marcela Carena in Scientific American
