= Mark Philip Bradley =

American historian and writer

- Education: Harvard University
- Occupations: Historian, writer

Mark Philip Bradley is an American historian and writer. He is the Bernadotte E. Schmitt Distinguished Service Professor in the department of history at the University of Chicago.

Bradley attended Harvard University, earning his PhD degree in 1995. He wrote the books Imagining Vietnam and America: The Making of Postcolonial Vietnam, Vietnam At War and The World Reimagined: Americans and Human Rights in the Twentieth Century.

Bradley has served as chief editor of The American Historical Review since August 2021.
