= Carlos E.M. Wagner =

American particle physicist

Carlos E. M. Wagner is a theoretical particle physicist known for his work on the phenomenology of physics beyond the Standard Model, including supersymmetry, electroweak symmetry breaking, Higgs physics, baryogenesis, and dark matter. He is a senior scientist in the High Energy Physics division of Argonne National Laboratory and a professor at the University of Chicago and is affiliated with the Department of Physics, the Enrico Fermi Institute, the Kavli Institute for Cosmological Physics, and the Leinweber Institute for Theoretical Physics. Since 2024, Wagner has held a Distinguished Visiting Research Chair at the Perimeter Institute for Theoretical Physics.

== Education and early career ==
Wagner studied physics at the Instituto Balseiro at the Centro Atómico Bariloche in San Carlos de Bariloche, Argentina. He received his PhD from the University of Hamburg in 1989, where his doctoral adviser was Istvan Montvay.

After completing his doctorate, he held postdoctoral positions at Purdue University (1989–1991) and at the Max Planck Institute for Physics in Munich (1991–1993), followed by a research appointment at CERN, first as a fellow and then as a staff member; he was offered a staff position at CERN in 1996. He joined Argonne National Laboratory and the University of Chicago around 1999, and his family settled in the Chicago area in 2000.

== Research ==
Wagner's research concerns the phenomenology of elementary particles, with an emphasis on collider physics, the physics of the Higgs boson, electroweak symmetry breaking, and the theory of dark matter. Within supersymmetric extensions of the Standard Model, he has studied theoretical predictions for the mass and properties of the Higgs boson. He has also worked on electroweak baryogenesis, a mechanism through which the observed matter–antimatter asymmetry of the universe could have been generated during a phase transition in the early universe. He has served as head of the theory group in Argonne's High Energy Physics division.

== Awards and honors ==
Wagner was elected a Fellow of the American Physical Society in 2008, cited for "contributions to the phenomenology of theories of supersymmetry and of electroweak symmetry breaking".In 2014 he was awarded a Humboldt Research Award, hosted at the Institute for Theoretical Physics of Heidelberg University.

In 2026 he was elected a Fellow of the American Association for the Advancement of Science, recognized for "groundbreaking contributions to the mechanism of electroweak symmetry breaking and its phenomenological consequences, and for outstanding mentorship of junior colleagues".

== Personal Life ==
He is married to Argentine theoretical physicist Marcela Carena.
