= Dario Maestripieri =

Italian behavioral biologist

- Born: 1964 (age 61–62); Italy
- Education: Università di Roma La Sapienza, Italy
- Scientific career
- Fields: Ethology, Primatology, Biological Anthropology, Biological Psychology, Evolutionary Psychology
- Workplaces: University of Chicago

Dario Maestripieri (born 1964) is an Italian behavioral biologist known for his research and writings about biological aspects of behavior in human and nonhuman primates. He is currently a professor of Comparative Human Development, Evolutionary Biology, and Neurobiology at The University of Chicago.

== Background ==
Maestripieri obtained a laurea in Biology in 1987 and a doctorate in psychobiology in 1992 from the Università di Roma La Sapienza, in Italy. After spending one year as a Visiting Researcher at the Sub-department of Animal Behaviour of the University of Cambridge in the U.K., he moved to Emory University in Atlanta, U.S.A., where he worked at the Yerkes National Primate Research Center from 1992 to 1999. He has been a professor at the University of Chicago since 1999.

== Research ==
Maestripieri conducts research with rhesus macaques at the Caribbean Primate Research Center of the University of Puerto Rico as well as research with human subjects at the University of Chicago. His studies of nonhuman primates have addressed topics such as aggression and dominance, affiliation and social bonding, communication and cognition, mating and reproduction, and parenting and development. Some of his work has elucidated the neuroendocrine regulation of primate behavior while other research has investigated its evolutionary significance. Human research conducted in Maestripieri's laboratory at the University of Chicago has focused on three different areas: parent-child relationships, attachment, and socio-emotional development; neuroendocrine regulation of social processes and stress reactivity; evolutionary psychology and neuroeconomics.

Maestripieri has published six books, several popular science essays, and over 175 scientific articles. Evolutionary Theory and Primate Behavior includes a collection of essays illustrating evolutionary analyses of major aspects of primate socioecology and behavior including feeding, social, and reproductive strategies. In Primate Psychology, Maestripieri integrates human and nonhuman primate research on many aspects of social behavior, development, communication and cognition. In Macachiavellian Intelligence: How Rhesus Macaques and Humans Have Conquered the World, he highlights the many parallels between the social behavior of rhesus macaques and human beings and explains them using evolutionary and economic cost-benefit analyses. He also suggests that complex political intelligence evolved in highly competitive primate societies played a role in the evolution of the human brain and human intelligence, as well as in our ecological success on this planet. Maternal Effects in Mammals is an edited collection of theoretical and empirical essays addressing the role of nongenetic maternal influences on phenotypic evolution in many species of mammals. In Animal Personalities: Behavior, Physiology, and Evolution, research on individual differences in behavior and reactivity to the environment in many animals and humans is discussed and integrated from a comparative and evolutionary perspective. In Games Primates Play: An Undercover Investigation of the Evolution and Economics of Human Relationships, Maestripieri illustrates how evolutionary and comparative studies, along with economic cost-benefit analyses of behavior, can explain why people behave the way they do in everyday social situations and in the negotiation of their personal and business relationships.

== Honors ==
Dario Maestripieri was awarded the B. Grassi Prize as the Best Young Zoologist from the Accademia Nazionale dei Lincei in Italy in 1989, the Distinguished Scientific Award for Early Career Contribution to Psychology from the American Psychological Association in 2000 and a Career Development Award from the National Institute of Mental Health in 2001. He has been elected Fellow of the Association for Psychological Science for sustained and outstanding distinguished contributions to psychological sciences, and Fellow of the American Association for the Advancement of Science for distinguished contributions to the integrative study of animal behavior.

== Selected works ==
=== Books ===
- Games Primates Play: An Undercover Investigation of the Evolution and Economics of Human Relationships (2012) Basic Books
- Animal Personalities: Behavior, Physiology, and Evolution (2012), with Claudio Carere, The University of Chicago Press
- Maternal Effects in Mammals (2009), with Jill Mateo, The University of Chicago Press
- Macachiavellian Intelligence: How Rhesus Macaques and Humans Have Conquered the World (2007) The University of Chicago Press
- Primate Psychology (2003) Harvard University Press
- Evolutionary Theory and Primate Behavior (2002), with Peter Kappeler, Springer

=== Articles ===
- Maestripieri, D. (2010). Platt, M.; Ghazanfar, A. (eds.). "Neurobiology of social behavior". Primate Neuroethology. Oxford: Oxford University Press: 359–384. doi:10.1093/acprof:oso/9780195326598.003.0019. ISBN 978-0-19-532659-8.
- Sapienza, P.; Zingales, L.; Maestripieri, D. (2009). "Gender differences in financial risk aversion and career choices are affected by testosterone". Proceedings of the National Academy of Sciences of the United States of America. 106 (36): 15268–15273. Bibcode:2009PNAS..10615268S. doi:10.1073/pnas.0907352106. PMC 2741240. PMID 19706398.
- Roney, JR.; Hanson, KN.; Durante, KM.; Maestripieri, D. (2006). "Reading men's faces: Women's mate attractiveness judgments track men's testosterone and interest in infants". Proceedings of the Royal Society B: Biological Sciences. 273 (1598): 2169–2175. doi:10.1098/rspb.2006.3569. PMC 1635527. PMID 16901836.
- Maestripieri, D.; Roney, JR. (2005). "Primate copulation calls and post-copulatory female choice". Behavioral Ecology. 16: 106–113. doi:10.1093/beheco/arh120.
- Maestripieri, D. (2005). "Early experience affects the intergenerational transmission of infant abuse in rhesus monkeys". Proceedings of the National Academy of Sciences of the United States of America. 102 (27): 9726–9729. Bibcode:2005PNAS..102.9726M. doi:10.1073/pnas.0504122102. PMC 1172276. PMID 15983367.
- Maestripieri, D.; Zehr, JL. (1998). "Maternal responsiveness increases during pregnancy and after estrogen treatment in macaques". Hormones and Behavior. 34 (3): 223–230. doi:10.1006/hbeh.1998.1470. PMID 9878271. S2CID 20711399.
- Maestripieri, D. (1995). "First steps in the macaque world: Do rhesus mothers encourage their infants' independent locomotion?". Animal Behaviour. 49 (6): 1541–1549. doi:10.1016/0003-3472(95)90075-6. S2CID 43638848.
- Maestripieri, D. (1993). "Vigilance costs of allogrooming in macaque mothers". The American Naturalist. 141 (5): 744–753. doi:10.1086/285503. PMID 19426008. S2CID 29266193.
