= Frederic Lamond (pianist) =

Scottish pianist and composer (1868–1948)

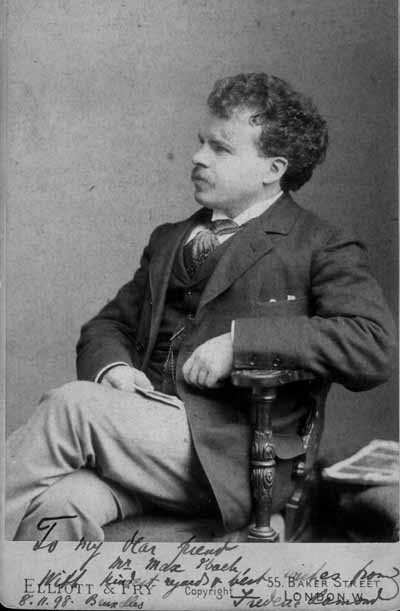
Frederic Lamond at the height of his career. The dedication reads: To my dear friend Mr. Max Ibach, with kindest regards and best wishes from Frederic Lamond. 8. 11. 1898, Bruxelles

Frederic Archibald Lamond (28 January 1868 – 21 February 1948) was a Scottish classical pianist and composer, and the second-last surviving pupil of Franz Liszt.

== Early life ==
Lamond was born in Glasgow, Scotland.

In 1882, Lamond entered the Raff-Konservatorium, in Frankfurt. He studied under Hugo Heermann (violin), Anton Urspruch (composition), Max Schwarz (piano); then piano with Hans von Bülow, Clara Schumann and Franz Liszt.

17 November 1885 Lamond made his debut in Berlin.

Lamond studied with Franz Liszt at Weimar and Rome in 1885, and in London in 1886. In 1886 Lamond also met Johannes Brahms, who coached him in his own works. Lamond also became acquainted with Anton Rubinstein in Germany, hearing him conduct and play many times there, and later in Russia in the 1890s.

== Career ==
In addition to becoming one of the early champions of Brahms' piano works, Lamond was considered the primary authority on Beethoven's piano music before Artur Schnabel, and Breitkopf & Härtel published his edition of the piano sonatas.

In 1893 Lamond was invited by Vasily Safonov to Moscow to play Tchaikovsky's First Piano Concerto in B-flat minor, Op. 23, at the request of the composer. While in Russia, he met Alexander Scriabin, whose Second Sonata, Op. 19, Lamond later played.

As a composer (in the 1880s and early 1890s), Lamont was not prolific. His orchestral works include a Symphony in A major, op. 3 (1893), the overture Aus dem schottischen Hochlande ('From the Scottish Highlands'), op. 4, and Sword Dance from Eine Liebe im Hochlande, all of which have been recorded. There are also piano pieces and a piano trio.

In 1904 Lamond married the Austrian actress Irene Triesch (1877–1964). Settled in Germany, he embarked on a series of international tours, including Russia, the USA and South America.

Lamond gave the first performance of John Ireland's E minor Piano Sonata on 12 June 1920, the only time he ever played it. In the 1920s and '30s he recorded many works of Beethoven (including an acoustic recording of the "Emperor" Concerto complete under Eugène Goossens, for His Master's Voice) and Liszt, as well as a scattered assortment of smaller works by other composers. While not the greatest of technicians by the time of his recordings — reviews from his youth praise his accuracy and bravura in such taxing works as the Brahms Paganini Variations, Op. 35 — his graceful phrasing and singing tone are quite remarkable.

In 1937 the University of Glasgow awarded Lamond an Honorary Doctor of Laws.

== Later life ==
Despite his declining technique, he continued to give concerts until the end of his life, and was in Prague in 1938 when the Nazis invaded Czechoslovakia. Forced to leave most of his belongings behind, including an unfinished novel, he left for England. A friend later recounted Lamond's flight when he was stopped at the border at Eger. "A Gestapo officer insisted on seeing his passport. 'You can see it, he said, 'but I will not allow you to take it into your hands.' The officer then asked him, 'Are you an Aryan?' to which Lamond replied, 'No, I am a monkey!' Lamond was a courageously outspoken man who would stand no nonsense."

Lamond was a highly respected teacher, among whose pupils were Victor Borge, Jan Chiapusso, Gunnar Johansen, Ervin Nyiregyházi, and Carrie Burpee Shaw. Lamond died at the age of eighty, in Stirling.

== Legacy ==
Lamond started writing his autobiography as a set of memoirs, dedicated to his late brother David.

In 1948, Lamond made recordings in early April 1945 at the BBC studios in Glasgow, talking about his time with Franz Liszt; he was at times reading from a draft of parts of Chapter V of his memoirs.

After Lamond's death in 1948, his widow Irene Triesch arranged for the incomplete memoirs to be published as a book. Chapter V of the book describes Lamond's time as a student of Franz Liszt in 1885–1886.

In 2015, David Pentecost created a documentary video biography about Lamond. Pentecost describes in one of his own books, his research about Lamond.
