= Maria Spiropulu =

Greek physicist

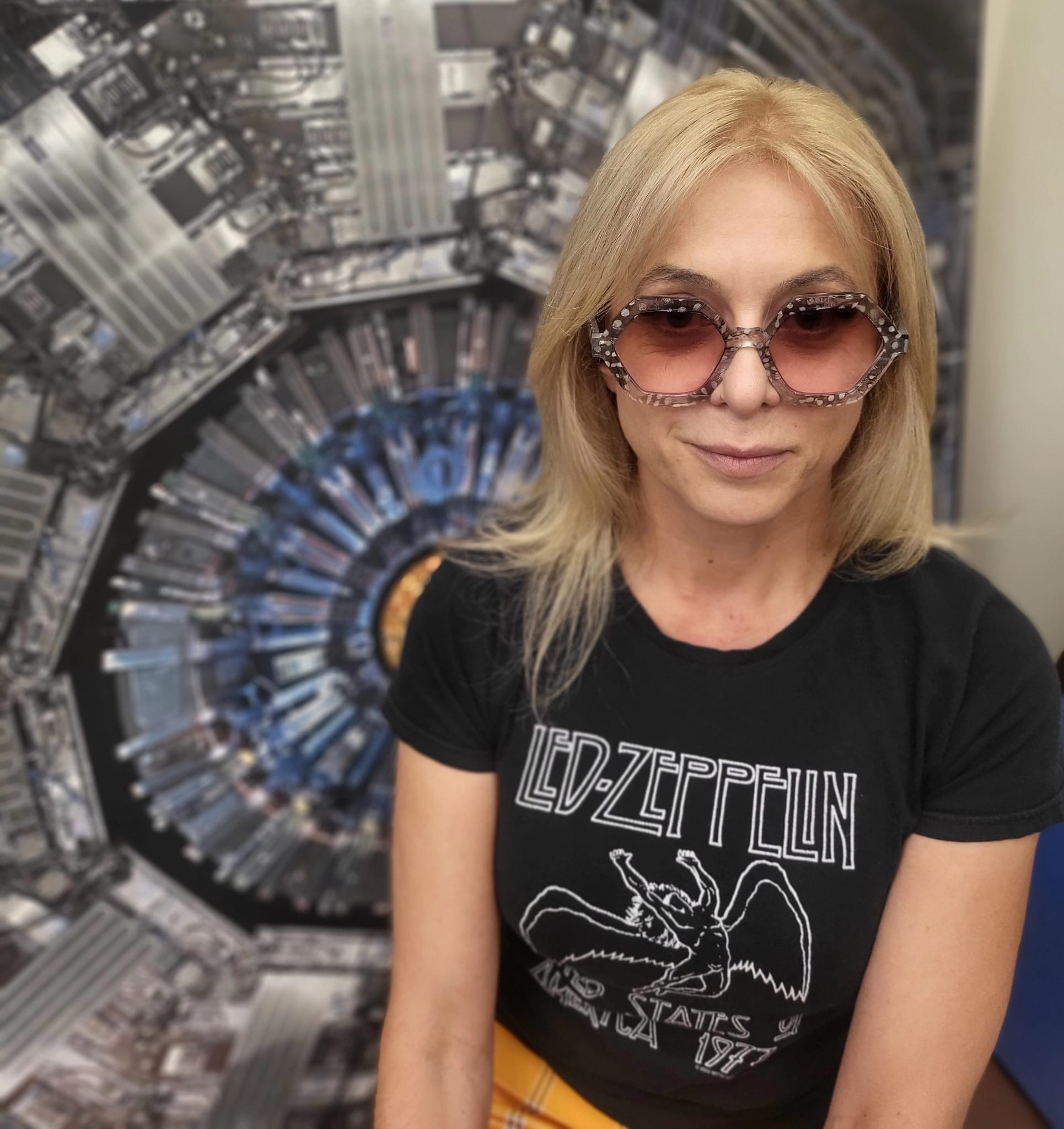
- Born: Kastoria, Greece
- Education: Aristotle University of Thessaloniki; Harvard University
- Known for: Advances in quantum networks, new methods to search for supersymmetry and extra dimensions at colliders
- Scientific career
- Fields: Particle physics
- Workplaces: Caltech
- Doctoral advisor: John Huth

Maria Spiropulu (/ˌspɪrəˈpuːluː/; Greek: Μαρία Σπυροπούλου) is a Greek particle physicist. She is the Shang-Yi Ch'en Professor of Physics at the California Institute of Technology.

== Biography ==
Maria Spiropulu received her bachelor's degree in physics from the Aristotle University of Thessaloniki in 1993, and obtained her PhD with the CDF experiment from Harvard University in 2000. For her doctoral thesis, she applied for the first time in hadron colliders a novel double blind analysis method to search for evidence of supersymmetry. She excluded a large part of the parameter space where supersymmetric particles were expected to emerge.

From 2001 to 2003, Spiropulu continued the CDF experiment as an Enrico Fermi fellow at the University of Chicago, using signatures of missing transverse energy to search for extra dimensions and supersymmetry. In 2004, she moved to CERN as a research scientist with the CMS experiment. From 2005 to 2008, she served as co-convener of the CMS physics analysis group searching for supersymmetry and other phenomena beyond the Standard Model. She was a senior research physicist at CERN until 2012, and has been professor of physics at the California Institute of Technology since 2009. She invented, with her student Chris Rogan and collaborators Maurizio Pierini and Joseph Lykken, a new set of kinematic variables ("razor") targeting the discovery and characterization of new physics at the LHC.

She worked at the Tevatron's collider experiments and at the CERN's Large Hadron Collider with leading roles on the detector and trigger R&D and operations and breakthroughs in the searches for dark matter and other new physics including the discovery of the Higgs boson. In 2014, she initiated a program to explore and apply quantum computation and artificial intelligence tools towards accelerating discovery in high-energy particle physics and other domain sciences.

Spiropulu is co-founder and President of Bohr Quantum Technology Corp. an advanced quantum networking technologies startup. In 2017, with Caltech, AT&T, Fermilab and JPL, she founded the Alliance for Quantum Technologies and the Intelligent Quantum Networks and Technology (IN-Q-NET), a multi-institutional private-public partnership research program that has produced notable results on fundamental R&D in areas of quantum information science and technology with emphasis on quantum networks. The latest results on quantum internet prototype systems were released in 2020 and feature state-of-the-art quantum teleportation fidelity in time-bin qubits and uptime operations. The project, and a first in theoretical modeling that includes imperfections of the realistic setup and comparison with the data, and overall a first in systems integration of such prototypes with automated monitoring, data acquisition and real-time data analysis systems on par with the Department of Energy's high energy physics (HEP) projects.

Since 2018 Spiropulu has been the PI of the Quantum Communications Channels for Fundamental Physics (QCCFP) project, supported by the QuantISED program of the U.S. Dept. of Energy Office of High Energy Physics. Accomplishments of this project include the first laboratory demonstration of traversable wormhole teleportation, using a Google Sycamore quantum processor.

Spiropulu was co-chair of the EPP2024 Committee of the National Academy of Sciences. She served as chair of the Fermilab Physics Advisory Committee, member of the High Energy Physics Advisory Panel to the U.S. Department of Energy and the National Science Foundation, chair of the Forum of International Physics and member of the Physics Policy Committee of the American Physical Society and Chair of the Caltech Faculty Board. She is a member of the Aspen Center for Physics and serves on the Advisory Panel of the HEP Forum for Computational Excellence. She testified in Congress in May 2017 on the Department of Energy's High Energy Physics Program Funding for FY 2018 and was selected to participate in the 2020-2021 Defense Science Study Group of the Institute for Defense Analyses (IDA) sponsored by DARPA.

She is the founder of the Physics of the Universe Summit that explores challenges in emerging and cross-cutting areas of science and technology. Spiropulu participated at the White House Summit on Advancing American Leadership in Quantum Information Science, on September 24, 2018 and participated in the signing ceremony for an International Cooperation Agreement between the U.S. Department of Energy, the National Science Foundation, and CERN in May 2015.

Spiropulu is the author of "Where is Einstein?", the final chapter in My Einstein: Essays by Twenty-four of the World's Leading Thinkers on the Man, His Work, and His Legacy.

Spiropulu is the academic great-granddaughter of Enrico Fermi, via her doctoral advisor John Huth and his advisor Owen Chamberlain.

== Awards ==
In 2008, Spiropulu was elected as a Fellow of the American Association for the Advancement of Science, "for her leadership in experimental high-energy physics, in particular for her pioneering efforts in the experimental search for supersymmetry and extra dimensions." In 2014, she was made a Fellow of the American Physical Society.

Spiropulu was the winner of the inaugural RSAC Frontier Award, presented at the RSAC Conference on March 25, 2026 in San Francisco. The award "recognizes visionary individuals, teams, and early stage ventures developing disruptive technologies with the potential to reshape security, privacy, and digital trust worldwide".
