= Sharmel Iris =

American poet

Scharmel Iris
- Born: Scharmel Iris; 1889; Italy
- Died: 1967 (aged 77–78); Chicago, Illinois, U.S.
- Other name: Vincent Holme

Scharmel Iris (1889–1967) was an ambitious Italian-American Catholic poet, who cultivated a reputation as a forger and con artist in Chicago for his many creative attempts to achieve fame.

Iris was born in Italy in 1889 and arrived in Chicago at age three, where he was first published in 1905. Iris never wavered from his goal of becoming the next great American poet, although his dedication to this goal led him into poverty. In order to support himself, he often used the pseudonym Vincent Holme to write letters of praise for his own work to publishers, or to attempt to raise funds from patrons of the humanities. Similarly, he wrote letters claiming to be the friend or relative of celebrated artists such as T. S. Eliot, W. B. Yeats, Salvador Dalí, and Pablo Picasso. Evidently these ploys worked in many cases, as Iris was published in Poetry Magazine and was reviewed in many Chicago papers. In another scheme, he used Lewis University as his address, implying that he was a faculty member, and he eventually moved into the college. He was expelled from the campus upon detection in 1966, and he died in a nearby retirement home in 1967.
