= Lyravine Votaw =

American music educator

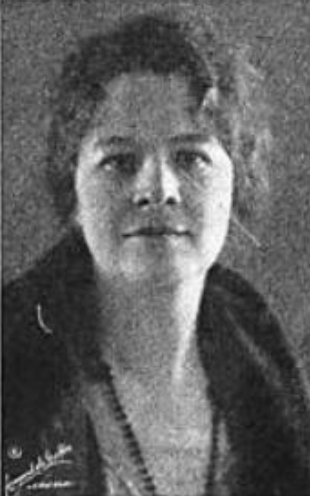
- Lyravine Votaw, from a 1928 publication
- Born: Harriet Lyravine Votaw; December 28, 1874; Cleveland, Ohio, U.S.
- Died: April 4, 1958 (age 83); Elgin, Illinois, U.S.
- Occupations: Music educator, editor, writer, singer

Harriet Lyravine Votaw (December 28, 1874 – April 4, 1958) was an American singer and music educator, based in Chicago.

== Early life and education ==
Votaw was born in Cleveland, Ohio, the daughter of Elihu Hilles Votaw and Harriet Weber Votaw. Her father was a clergyman. She graduated from the American Conservatory of Music in Chicago, with degrees in teaching and voice. Mary Forrest Ganz, the first wife of Rudolph Ganz, and Karleton Hackett were among her teachers.

== Career ==
Votaw was a contralto singer and church soloist, and taught music educators in Chicago. She was director of the school music department at the Bush Conservatory of Music. She held special classes for public school music teachers in evenings and Saturdays. She also taught music at the Frances Shimer School, the Dearborn School of Lyceum Arts, and, until 1937, at North Park College.

Votaw was a contributing editor to The Supervisors Service Bulletin, a publication for school music educators. She was also head of the Public School Music department of Musicians' Magazine. She also composed and arranged music for school use. She was an active member of the Daughters of the American Revolution (DAR) and the American Association of University Women (AAUW).

== Publications ==
- "Psychological Principles and School Music" (1919)
- "A Symphonic Tale" (1925)
- "The Why and Wherefore of the Junior High School" (1925)
- "A Supervisor's Opportunities" (1928, a four-part series)
- "Masks or Faces" (1928)
- "Our American Education: Do You Know?" (1928)
- "If I Just Had Time" (1929)
- Rhythm Band Direction (1935)

== Personal life ==
Votaw moved to Texas in the late 1930s, but returned to Chicago in her last years. She died in 1958, at the age of 83, in Elgin, Illinois.
