= PMLA =

PMLA may refer to:

- Prevention of Money Laundering Act, 2002, an Act of the Parliament of India
- Prime Minister's Literary Awards, Australia
- Publications of the Modern Language Association of America, a journal
