= Joseph Lykken =

American physicist

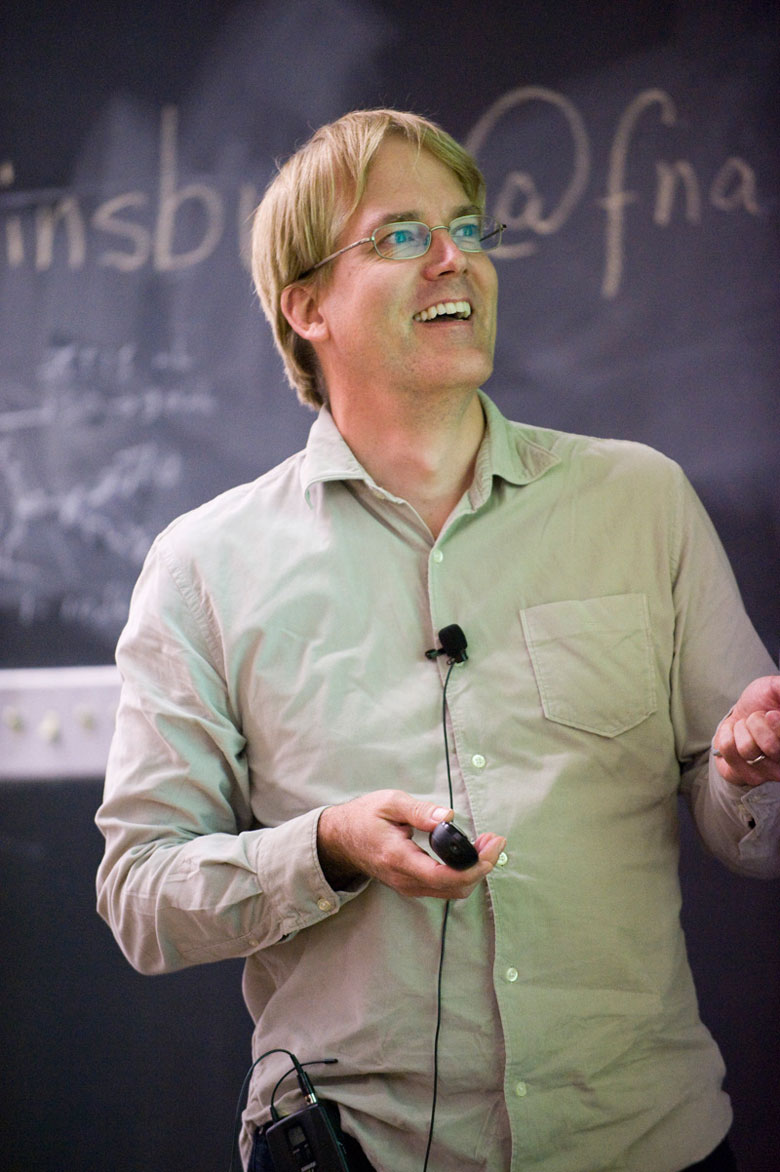
- Education: Massachusetts Institute of Technology
- Known for: Research advances relating to wormholes, extra dimensions, supersymmetry, the Higgs boson, and superstrings.
- Scientific career
- Fields: Physics
- Workplaces: Fermilab, University of Chicago
- Thesis: Gauge Invariant Formulations of Large N Quantum Chromodynamics (1982)
- Doctoral advisor: Roman Jackiw

Joseph David Lykken (/ˈlɪkən/ LIK-ən) is an American theoretical physicist at the Fermi National Accelerator Laboratory and, from July 1, 2014 to Sept 6, 2022, he was the Deputy Director of Fermilab. He is currently Director of Fermilab's Quantum Division.

== Background and education ==
Lykken was born in Minneapolis, Minnesota. He is the son of David T. Lykken, noted psychologist, behavioral geneticist, and twin researcher.

Lykken received his Ph.D. in 1982 from M.I.T. He arrived at Fermilab in 1989, where he worked in the Fermilab Theory Division, and as a collaborator of the Compact Muon Solenoid (CMS) experiment at the CERN Large Hadron Collider.

== Research ==
In 1983 Lykken's paper with Lawrence Hall and Steven Weinberg helped establish the minimal supersymmetric standard model as a leading paradigm for physics beyond the Standard Model. In 1996 Lykken proposed "weak scale superstrings," which posited extra dimensions of space within the reach of particle colliders, such as the Fermilab Tevatron, and the CERN Large Hadron Collider. As a member of the CMS collaboration, he was co-author of the Higgs boson discovery paper, and with Maurizio Pierini, Chris Rogan, and Maria Spiropulu, developed a new set of kinematic variables ("razor") targeting the discovery and characterization of new physics at the LHC. Since 2018 he has been a member of the Quantum Communications Channels for Fundamental Physics (QCCFP) project, supported by the QuantISED program of the U.S. Dept. of Energy Office of High Energy Physics. Accomplishments of this project include the first laboratory demonstration of traversable wormhole teleportation, using a Google Sycamore quantum processor.

== Professional activities ==
Lykken is a former member and subpanel chair of the High Energy Physics Advisory Panel, which advises the United States Department of Energy and the National Science Foundation. He was a Trustee of the Aspen Center for Physics in Aspen, Colorado. He is a Fellow of the American Physical Society (APS) and the American Association for the Advancement of Science (AAAS), and is former chair of the APS Division of Particles and Fields.

== Selected publications ==
Lykken's publications are available on the INSPIRE-HEP Literature Database .
