= Walter Blair (folklorist) =

American academic and folklorist

- Born: April 21, 1900; Spokane, Washington, U.S.
- Died: June 29, 1992 (aged 92); Chicago, Illinois, U.S.
- Occupations: Academic, literary scholar, folklorist

Academic background
- Education: Yale University (BA, 1923); University of Chicago (MA, 1926; PhD, 1931)

Academic work
- Discipline: American literature, folklore, American humor
- Institutions: University of Chicago
- Notable students: Saul Bellow, Philip Roth
- Notable works: Native American Humor (1937); Tall Tale America (1944); Mark Twain & Huck Finn (1960)

Walter Blair (April 21, 1900 – June 29, 1992) was an American literary scholar and professor in the University of Chicago English department who was known for his study of American folklore, humor, and tall tales.

Born in Spokane, Washington, he graduated from Yale University in 1923 and received, in 1926, received his master's degree from the University of Chicago. In 1931, he earned his PhD in English from the same institution. Blair taught at Chicago from 1929 to 1968, and served as the chairman of its English department for nine years (1951–1960).

His works included Native American Humor: 1800 to 1900 (1937), Horse Sense in American Humor (1942), Tall Tale America: A Legendary History of Our Humorous Heroes (1944, multiple reprints), Half-Horse Half-Alligator: The Growth of the Mike Fink Legend, Davy Crockett: Truth and Legend, Mark Twain & Huck Finn (1960), and a mystery novel called Candidate for Murder, the last of which was published under the pseudonym Mortimer Post.

Notable students of Blair included Nobel laureate Saul Bellow and Pulitzer Prize winner Philip Roth, as well as four other Pulitzer Prize winners.

In May 1992, he won the Distinguished Scholar Award of the Mark Twain Circle, an association of Twain scholars.

Blair was a resident of the Hyde Park neighborhood of Chicago. He died at his home there on June 29, 1992, aged 92.
