= Comaroff =

Comaroff is a surname. Notable people with the surname include:

- Jean Comaroff (born 1947), South African anthropologist, wife of John
- John Comaroff (born 1945), South African anthropologist, husband of Jean
