= John Boyer =

John Boyer may refer to:

- John W. Boyer (born 1946), an American historian and academic advisor
- John Boyer (software engineer) (1936–2023), an American software developer
