= Constantin Fasolt =

German-American historian

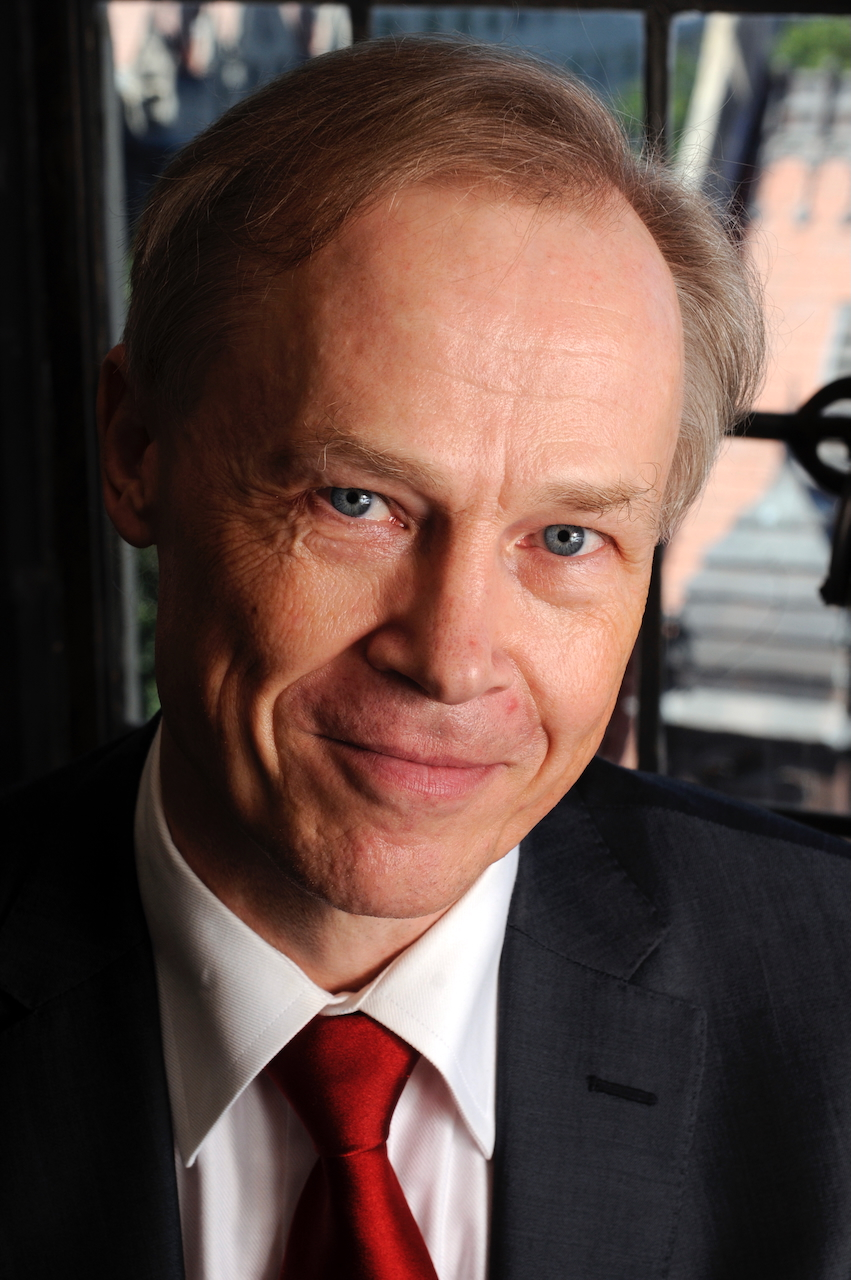
- Born: March 18, 1951 (age 75); Germany
- Occupations: Historian, professor
- Known for: Work on conciliar theory, historiography, and the philosophy of history

Academic background
- Education: University of Bonn; University of Heidelberg; Columbia University (Ph.D.)
- Thesis: William Durant the Younger's 'Tractatus de modo generalis concilii celebrandi': An Early 14th-Century Conciliar Theory (1981)
- Doctoral advisor: John Hine Mundy

Academic work
- Discipline: History
- Sub-discipline: Intellectual history, medieval and early modern Europe
- Institutions: University of Chicago
- Notable works: Council and Hierarchy (1991); The Limits of History (2004)
- Website: constantinfasolt.org

Constantin Fasolt (born 1951) is a German-American historian and scholar specializing in the development and significance of historical thought. He is the Karl J. Weintraub Professor Emeritus of Medieval and Early Modern European History at the University of Chicago, where he taught from 1983 until his retirement in 2017.

== Early life and education ==
Fasolt was born in Germany and attended the Beethoven-Gymnasium in Bonn from 1961 to 1969. After completing two years of military service, he enrolled at the University of Bonn to study philosophy, history, and English language and literature. He later transferred to the University of Heidelberg, where he studied under noted philosophers including Hans-Georg Gadamer, Michael Theunissen, and Ernst Tugendhat.

Fasolt was especially impressed by Tugendhat, and later remarked, "that was a philosopher—if I had met him as my first teacher, I could have stayed in philosophy, probably, and not gone to the United States." However, disillusioned by what he described as "overcrowded" and "undemanding" conditions at German universities, he decided to pursue his academic career in the United States.

In 1975, Fasolt moved to the U.S. and enrolled at Columbia University, where he studied medieval history with John H. Mundy, J. M. W. Bean, Robert Somerville, Eugene F. Rice Jr., and Paul Oskar Kristeller and wrote his dissertation under Mundy's supervision. He earned his M.A. in 1976, M.Phil. in 1978, and Ph.D. with distinction in 1981.

== Academic career ==
From 1979 to 1981 Fasolt taught Columbia University's core course "Contemporary Civilization" as a preceptor in history, and from 1981 to 1983 as a lecturer in history. From 1981 to 1983 he also held a Mellon Fellowship at Columbia's Society of Fellows in the Humanities.

In 1983, he joined the University of Chicago as Assistant Professor of History and shifted most of his teaching and research into the early modern period. He became Associate Professor in 1990, full Professor in 1999, and was named Karl J. Weintraub Professor in 2007. He retired in 2017 and now holds the title of Karl J. Weintraub Professor Emeritus.

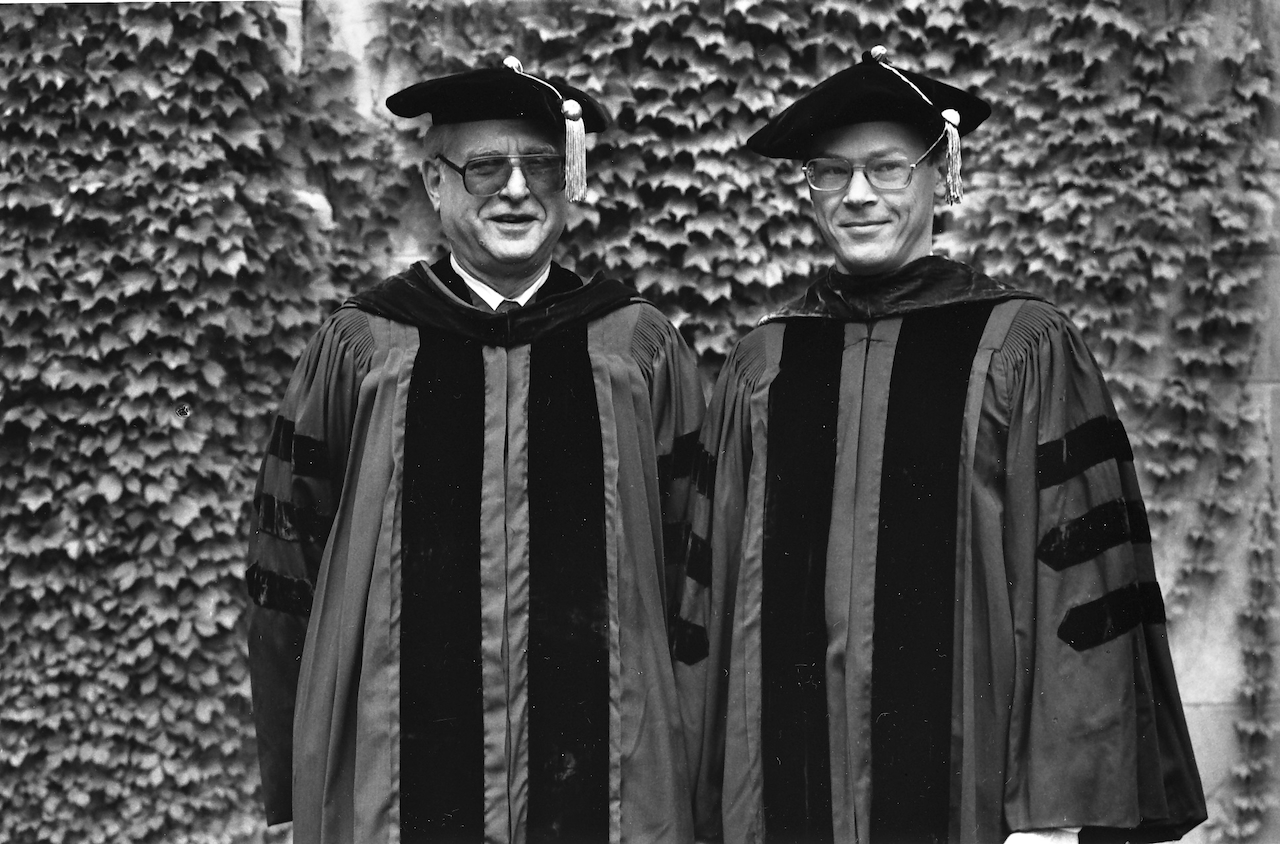
Karl J. Weintraub and Constantin Fasolt, Quantrell Awards 1989. (Photo courtesy of The University of Chicago)

He held visiting professorships at the University of Virginia (1999–2000) and the University of Notre Dame (2002–03).

Fasolt came to prominence through his work in conciliar theory and historiography, especially in Council and Hierarchy (1991) and The Limits of History (2004). As an administrator, he chaired numerous committees and served as Master of the Social Sciences Collegiate Division, Deputy Dean of the Division of the Social Sciences, and Associate Dean of the College (2005–2008).

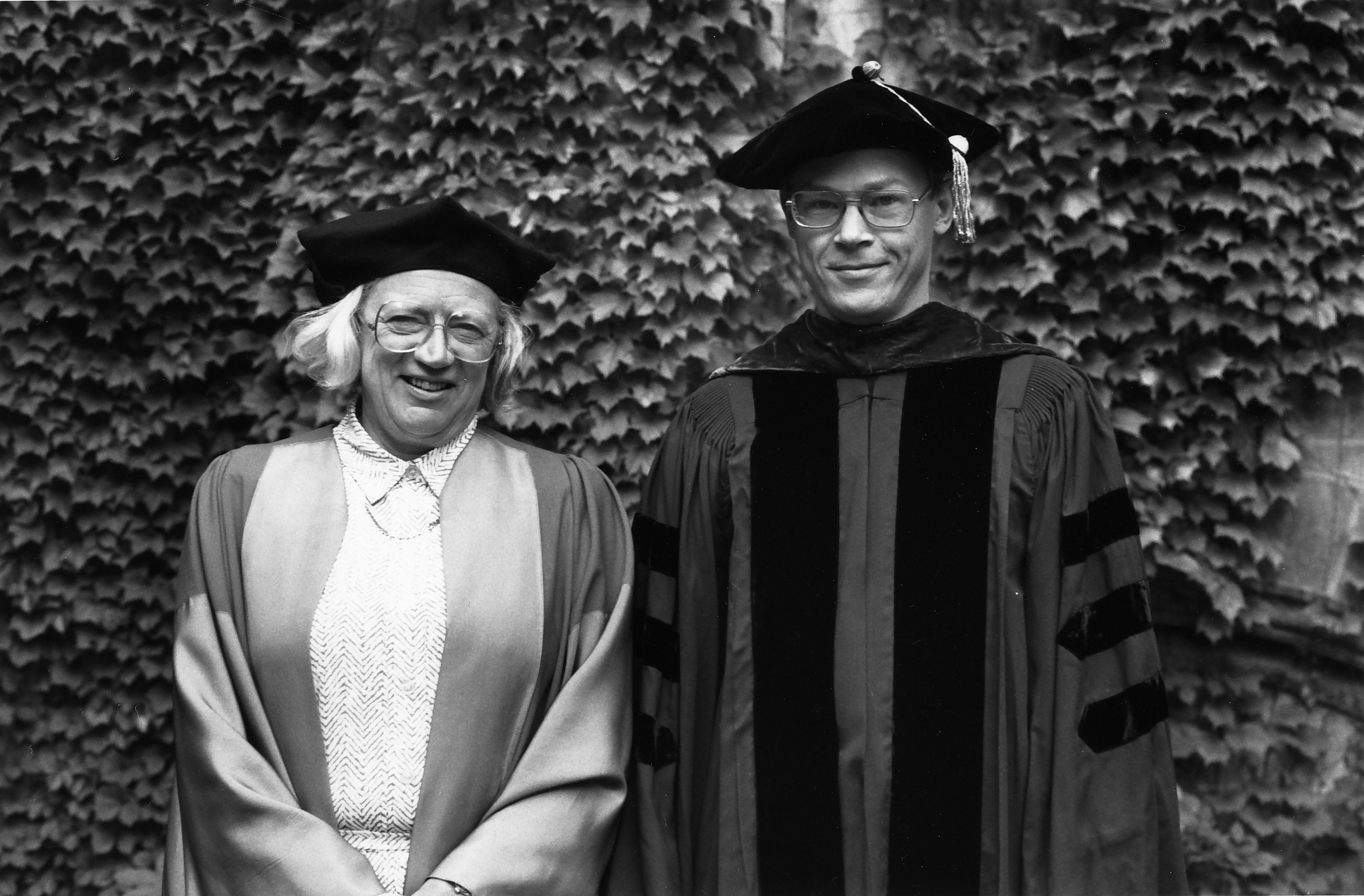
Hanna H. Gray and Constantin Fasolt, Quantrell Awards 1989. (Photo courtesy of The University of Chicago)

He was also general editor (1993–present) of the book series New Perspectives on the Past, with volumes published by Cornell University Press, Blackwell, and Wiley.

== Research and scholarship ==
Fasolt's scholarship centers on the transformation of European political and historical thought from the medieval period through the early modern era. His research delves into the evolution of concepts such as sovereignty, democracy, and human rights, examining how these ideas have shaped modern understandings of history and governance.

His first major work, Council and Hierarchy: The Political Thought of William Durant the Younger (1991), explores the origin and significance of late medieval theories of constitutional government for the conciliar movement and its role in the replacement of ecclesiastical with secular forms of governance in early modern times. In The Limits of History (2004), Fasolt challenges the modern understanding of historical objectivity, arguing that the scholarly study of history on the basis of primary evidence, no matter how thoroughly devoid of bias, is inherently and essentially political. He further elaborates on these themes in Past Sense: Studies in Medieval and Early Modern European History (2014), a collection of twenty previously published studies with a new introduction.

Fasolt has also contributed to the translation and analysis of significant historical texts, including his edition of Hermann Conring's New Discourse on the Roman-German Emperor and help with Osvaldo Cavallar and Julius Kirshner, Jurists and Jurisprudence in Medieval Italy: Texts and Contexts (2020).

In 1989, he received the Quantrell Award for Excellence in Undergraduate Teaching.

== Professional service ==
Fasolt served as chair of multiple core programs at the University of Chicago, including "History of Western Civilization," "Classics of Social and Political Thought," and "History of European Civilization." He was a member of the College Council, a referee for major academic publishers and foundations, and served on editorial boards including H-WCiv and H-Teach.

== Bibliography ==
=== Books and edited books ===
- Past Sense: Studies in Medieval and Early Modern European History. Studies in Medieval and Reformation Traditions, ed. Andrew Colin Gow, vol. 182. Leiden: Brill, 2014.
- The Limits of History. Chicago: University of Chicago Press, 2004.
- Council and Hierarchy: The Political Thought of William Durant the Younger. Cambridge Studies in Medieval Life and Thought, 4th series, ed. David Luscombe. Cambridge: Cambridge University Press, 1991.
- Osvaldo Cavallar and Julius Kirshner. Jurists and Jurisprudence in Medieval Italy: Texts and Contexts. With the help of Constantin Fasolt. Toronto Studies in Medieval Law, vol. 4. Toronto: University of Toronto Press, 2020.
- Hermann Conring's New Discourse on the Roman-German Emperor. Ed. and trans. Constantin Fasolt. Medieval and Renaissance Texts and Studies, 282. Tempe, AZ: Arizona Center for Medieval and Renaissance Studies, 2005.
- General Editor of New Perspectives on the Past, a series of monographs founded by R. I. Moore in 1983 and published by Blackwell, Oxford. Books published since 1993: David Arnold, The Problem of Nature (1996); Ernest Gellner, Nations and Nationalism, 2nd edition (2006); Francis Oakley, Kingship (2006); William Ray, The Logic of Culture (2001); Bruce Trigger, Sociocultural Evolution (1998); David Turley, Slavery (2000); Merry Wiesner, Gender in History (2001).

=== Articles, chapters in books, and other published writings ===
- Fasolt, Constantin. "History, Law, and Justice: Empirical Method and Conceptual Confusion in the History of Law." In "Law As . . ." III—Glossolalia: Toward a Minor (Historical) Jurisprudence, ed. Christopher L. Tomlins. UC Irvine Law Review 5 (2015): 413–62.
- Fasolt, Constantin. "Introduction: A Program of Research." In Past Sense: Studies in Medieval and Early Modern European History, by Constantin Fasolt, 1–106. Leiden: Brill, 2014.
- Fasolt, Constantin. "Breaking up Time—Escaping from Time: Self-Assertion and Knowledge of the Past." In Breaking Up Time: Negotiating the Borders between Present, Past and Future, ed. Chris Lorenz and Berber Bevernage, 176–96. Göttingen: Vandenhoeck & Ruprecht, 2013.
- Fasolt, Constantin. "Saving Renaissance and Reformation: History, Grammar, and Disagreements with the Dead." Religions 3 (2012): 662–80. Reprinted in From the Renaissance to the Modern World: A Tribute to John M. Headley, ed. Peter Iver Kaufman, 68–86. Basel: MDPI, 2013.
- Fasolt, Constantin. "Hegel's Ghost: Europe, the Reformation, and the Middle Ages." Viator 39 (2008): 345–386. Reprinted in Constantin Fasolt, Past Sense (2014): 545–96.
- Fasolt, Constantin. "Religious Authority and Ecclesiastical Governance." In The Renaissance World, ed. John Jeffries Martin, 364–380. New York – London: Routledge, 2007. Reprinted in Constantin Fasolt, Past Sense (2014): 525–44.
- Headley, John M., Sanjay Subrahmanyam, Constantin Fasolt, and John M. Hobson. "Recentering the West: A Forum." Historically Speaking 9, no. 2 (Nov/Dec 2007): 9–19.
- Fasolt, Constantin. "Hermann Conring and the European History of Law." In Politics and Reformations: Histories and Reformations. Essays in Honor of Thomas A. Brady, Jr., ed. Christopher Ocker, Michael Printy, Peter Starenko, and Peter Wallace, 113–134. Studies in Medieval and Reformation Traditions, vol. 127. Leiden: Brill, 2007. Reprinted in Constantin Fasolt, Past Sense (2014): 445–63.
- Fasolt, Constantin. "History and Religion in the Modern Age." History and Theory, Theme Issue 45 (2006): 10–26.
- Fasolt, Constantin. "Red Herrings: Relativism, Objectivism, and Other False Dilemmas." Storia della storiografia 48 (2005): 17–26.
- Fasolt, Constantin. "Empire the Modern Way." Disquisitions on the Past & Present 13 (2005): 73–82. Reprinted in Constantin Fasolt, Past Sense (2014): 503–11.
- Fasolt, Constantin, Allan Megill, and Gabrielle M. Spiegel. "The Limits of History: An Exchange." Historically Speaking 6, no. 5 (May/June 2005): 5–17.
- Fasolt, Constantin. "Political Unity and Religious Diversity: Hermann Conring's Confessional Writings and the Preface to Aristotle's Politics of 1637." In Confessionalization in Europe, 1555–1700: Essays in Honor and Memory of Bodo Nischan, ed. John M. Headley, Hans J. Hillerbrand, and Anthony J. Papalas, 319–45. Aldershot: Ashgate, 2004. Reprinted in Constantin Fasolt, Past Sense (2014): 416–44.
- Fasolt, Constantin. "Sovereignty and Heresy." In Infinite Boundaries: Order, Disorder, and Reorder in Early Modern German Culture, ed. Max Reinhart, 381–91. Kirksville, Missouri: Sixteenth Century Essays & Studies, 1998. Reprinted in Constantin Fasolt, Past Sense (2014): 493–502.
- Fasolt, Constantin. "William Durant the Younger and Conciliar Theory." Journal of the History of Ideas 58 (1997): 385–402. Reprinted in Constantin Fasolt, Past Sense (2014): 294–312.
- Fasolt, Constantin. "Visions of Order in the Canonists and Civilians." In Handbook of European History, 1400–1600: Late Middle Ages, Renaissance and Reformation, ed. Thomas A. Brady, Jr., Heiko Oberman, and James Tracy, 2:31–59. Leiden: Brill, 1995. Reprinted in Constantin Fasolt, Past Sense (2014): 467–92.
- Fasolt, Constantin. "Quod omnes tangit ab omnibus approbari debet: The Words and the Meaning." In In Iure Veritas: Studies in Canon Law in Memory of Schafer Williams, ed. Steven Bowman and Blanche Cody, 21–55. Cincinnati, Ohio: University of Cincinnati, College of Law, 1991. Reprinted in Constantin Fasolt, Past Sense (2014): 222–57.

Fasolt has also contributed reviews in the following journals: American Historical Review, Bryn Mawr Classical Review, German History, Journal of Modern History, Renaissance Quarterly, and Sixteenth Century Journal.
