= Chapin Hall (institute) =

American policy research institute

Chapin Hall at the University of Chicago
- Focus: Child and family services
- Executive director: Brian Samuels
- Location: Chicago, Illinois, United States
- Website: www.uchicago.edu/research/center/chapin_hall/

Chapin Hall is a research and policy center based in Chicago that focuses on the well-being of children, youth, and families. Chapin Hall's work is funded by federal, state and local government agencies, foundations, and non-profit organizations. The organization's three impact areas are child welfare, youth homelessness, and community capacity building.

== History ==
Chapin Hall was founded in 1860 as the Chicago Nursery and Half-Orphan Asylum. In addition to housing orphans and other dependent children, the Asylum provided day care services for working mothers. In 1931, the Chicago Nursery and Half-Orphan Asylum moved into a building at 2800 West Foster Avenue. After the move, the organization became known by the name of that building, Chapin Hall Center for Children. By the 1960s and 70s, Chapin Hall Center for Children was financially dependent on state money. During the 70s and 80s, national public policy shifted to fund institutional care for only "severely disturbed children." As a result of dwindling support, in 1984, Chapin Hall Center for Children closed its residential care program and reopened the following year as a research center that was part of the University of Chicago. It first Executive Director was Harold A. Richman. Chapin Hall separated from the University of Chicago in 2013 but retained an affiliation. That affiliation ended in 2024. Chapin Hall is now a fully independent research and policy center. Its current executive director is Bryan Samuels, who joined the organization in 2013 after serving as the commissioner of the Administration on Children, Youth and Families in Washington D.C.

== Organization ==
Chapin Hall’s mission is to improve child, youth, family, and community well-being by generating actionable knowledge for practitioners, administrators, and policymakers. Its work is guided by a commitment to conducting rigorous, policy- relevant research.

Chapin Hall counts among its assets a motivated staff that includes approximately 70 researchers and policy analysts across the U.S. who are trained in a variety of academic and professional disciplines, including social welfare, public policy, economics, education, public health, psychology, and sociology. These individuals bring substantive knowledge, statistical and methodological expertise, and practice experience to their work. It currently has more than 120 active projects with budgets totaling upward of $21 million.

Chapin Hall has long been a leader in the field of child welfare research and pioneered the use of linked administrative data to study the provision of child welfare services and the outcomes of child welfare system-involved children and families. It has made major contributions through its research on the outcomes of children and youth in foster care, the impact of social-ecological factors on child welfare service provision, and the effects of child welfare interventions.

== Research and policy initiatives ==
=== Center for State Child Welfare Data ===
The Center for State Child Welfare Data is a platform that enables public sector agencies to store and analyze administrative data related to children placed in out-of-home care. As of 2017, 22 states used the platform, covering about 70% of children in the U.S. in the child welfare system.

One component of Center is the Foster Care Data Archive. The archive provides access to information about children in the foster care system over time.

In addition to providing a platform for the data, Chapin Hall staff help members analyze data for both policymaking and in practice.

=== Voices of Youth Count Initiative ===
Voices of Youth Count is a research initiative on youth experiences of unaccompanied homelessness in the U.S. Chapin Hall partnered with twenty-two counties across the U.S. to conduct "youth-led counts and surveys of young people and providers". The research also included qualitative interviews in five of those twenty-two counties, a national phone survey, a survey of service providers, a review of policy related to youth homelessness, and a systematic review of published evidence on the effectiveness of programs targeting youth homelessness.

Based on these data sources, Voices of Youth Count has produced a series of policy briefs. The first provided an estimate of the scale and character of youth homelessness in the U.S. The second report focused on lesbian, gay, bisexual, trans, and queer youth, and the third looked at youth homelessness among pregnant or parenting young people.

Reports on youth counts, youth homelessness in the rural U.S., youth trajectories into and through homelessness, child welfare, and education are forthcoming.
