= Quantrell Award =

Teaching award by the University of Chicago

- Awarded for: Excellence in Undergraduate Teaching
- Sponsored by: Ernest Quantrell
- Presented by: University of Chicago
- Established: 1938
- Website: https://www.uchicago.edu/who-we-are/global-impact/accolades/llewellyn-john-and-harriet-manchester-quantrell-awards-for-excellence-in-undergraduate-teaching

The Quantrell Award, or the Llewellyn John and Harriet Manchester Quantrell Awards for Excellence in Undergraduate Teaching is a prize awarded by the University of Chicago for excellence in undergraduate teaching.

== History ==
The award was established in 1938 through an anonymous endowment from University of Chicago trustee Ernest Quantrell. The award is presented to between three and six recipients each year, who are nominated by the students. It is believed by the university to be the oldest prize for undergraduate teaching in the United States. It comes with a stipend, which was originally $1,000.

In 1947, Louise Roberts became the first woman to receive the Quantrell Award.

In 1952, Quantrell agreed to make his contribution known and named the prize after his parents.

As of 2019, the university required recipients to be full-time, tenure track faculty or senior lecturers.

== Recipients ==
Notable recipients of the award have been (please note the list below is incomplete as it does not include every recipient who won the award in some of the years):

- 2026: Nick Feamster, Fredrik Albritton Jonsson
- 2025: Eleonory Gilburd, Lenore Grenoble
- 2023: Leora Auslander, Robert L. Kendrick
- 2022: David Schmitz
- 2021: Jonathan R. Lyon, Ada Palmer
- 2020: David Archer, Susan Gal
- 2019: Berthold Hoeckner, Maryanthe Malliaris
- 2018: Boaz Keysar
- 2017: Andrew Abbott, Agnes Callard, Bana Jabri
- 2014: John E. Woods
- 2013: Jeffrey A. Harvey
- 2012: Howard Nusbaum, Jason Merchant, Cathy Cohen
- 2011: Angela Olinto, Charles Lipson
- 2009: Amy Dru Stanley, Jonathan M. Hall
- 2008: Eric Larsen, Michael Kremer
- 2007: Thomas Pavel
- 2006: Russell Tuttle
- 2005: Kenneth W. Warren, László Babai
- 2004: David Jablonski
- 2003: Bernard Roizman, Susan Goldin-Meadow
- 2002: Mario Santana, John Comaroff, Jean Comaroff
- 2001: Danielle Allen
- 2000: D. Gale Johnson, David G. Grier, Shadi Bartsch
- 1999: Moishe Postone, Susan Kidwell, Bertram Cohler
- 1998: Stephen Stigler, Steven Levitt
- 1997: Lawrence McEnerney, Elizabeth Alexander , Gregory L. Hillhouse
- 1996: Sidney Nagel, James Hopson, Hanna Holborn Gray
- 1995: Richard Kron
- 1994: Michael J. Wade, Ingrid Rowland, James Cronin
- 1993: Gerald Rosenberg, Edward Kolb, Laurie Butler
- 1992: Richard Saller, Fred Donner
- 1991: David Malament
- 1990: Peter White, Harold Richman, Leo P. Kadanoff, Philip Kurland
- 1989: Lauren Berlant, Constantin Fasolt
- 1988: Jan Goldstein
- 1987: James Redfield, Karl Weintraub
- 1986: Jonathan Z. Smith, David W. Oxtoby
- 1985: John Mearsheimer, Anna Crone
- 1984: Dennis Hutchinson, Jean Comaroff
- 1983: William H. McNeill, Ted Cohen, Leon Kass
- 1982: Robert J. Richards, Edward Garber, Janel Mueller
- 1981: Sam Peltzman, Mark Inghram
- 1980: John Alexander Simpson, Amy Kass, Robert Geroch
- 1979: Marvin Zonis, David Bevington
- 1978: Herbert Friedmann (biochemist, not ornithologist of same name)
- 1976: Richard Taub
- 1975: William Veeder, Bertram Cohler
- 1974: Philip Gossett
- 1973: John Hubby, Norman Maclean, Edward Anders
- 1972: Wayne Booth, H. Gregg Lewis, Richard Beals
- 1971: Peter Meyer, Richard McKeon, Donald N. Levine
- 1970: Stuart Rice, Joseph Cropsey, Easley Blackwood Jr.
- 1969: Henry Rago, Virgil Burnett, Isaac Abella
- 1968: Dudley Shapere
- 1967: Gilbert F. White, David Wake
- 1966: Elder Olson
- 1965: James M. Redfield
- 1964: Ralph Lerner, John Cawelti
- 1963: Richard Lashof, McKim Marriott
- 1962: Edward Wasiolek
- 1961: Irving Kaplansky
- 1960: Karl Weintraub
- 1959: Lawrence Bogorad
- 1958: Stuart Tave, Maynard Krueger
- 1957: Reuel Denney
- 1956: Rosalie Wax
- 1954: Beatrice Mintz
- 1952: Alfred Putnam
- 1949: Warner Wick, Richard M. Weaver,
- 1948: Milton Singer
- 1947: Louise Roberts (first woman to receive the prize), Benson Ginsburg
- 1946: Robert Keohane
- 1944: Everett Olson
- 1942: Russell Thomas, David Daiches
- 1941: Norman Maclean
- 1940: James Cate
- 1939: Ralph Buchsbaum
- 1938: Joseph Schwab
