= Bana Jabri =

French researcher (born 1961)

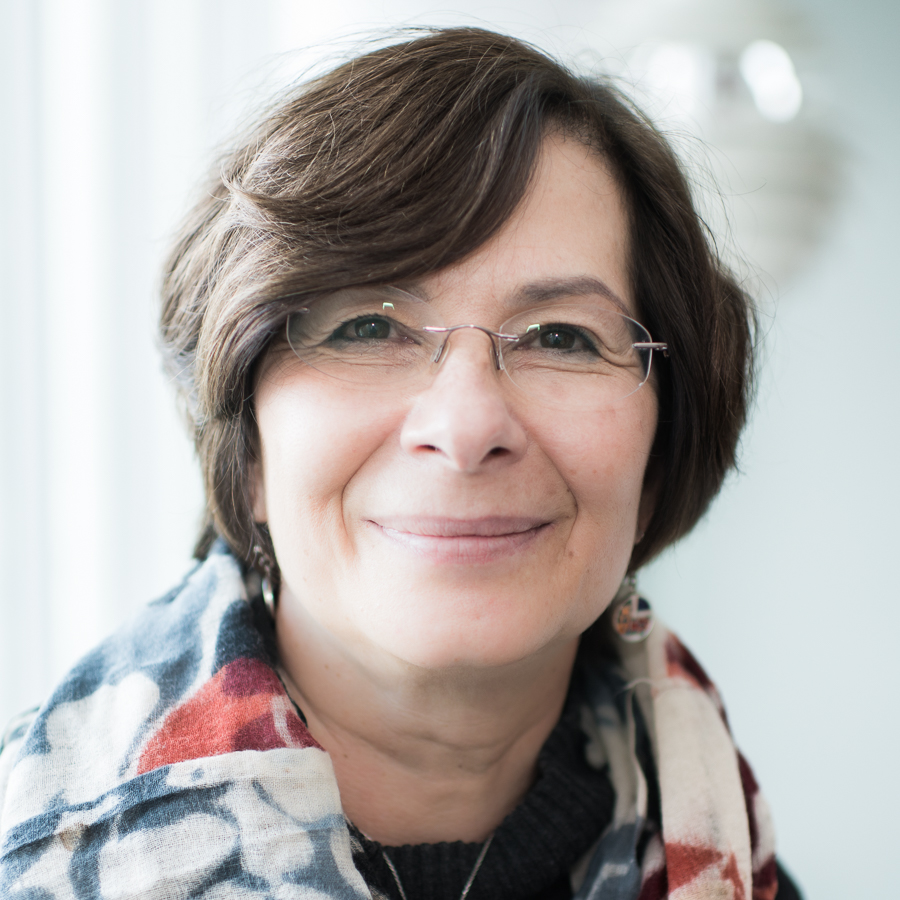
- Born: Damascus, Syria
- Education: Paris Diderot University; Pasteur Institute
- Scientific career
- Workplaces: Necker–Enfants Malades Hospital; Princeton University; University of Chicago

Bana Jabri (born 1961) is a French gastroenterologist and immunologist of Syrian and Armenian descent. She is the Sarah and Harold Lincoln Thompson Professor in the Department of Medicine at the University of Chicago. She researches inflammatory diseases of the intestine, including celiac disease. She is an elected fellow of the Association of American Physicians.

== Early life and education ==
Jabri was born in 1961 in Damascus, Syria to a Syrian father and an Armenian mother. She moved to Germany when she was two years old and to France when she was twelve. She attended Paris Diderot University, graduating in 1986 with a bachelor's degree in biochemistry. She graduated from the Pasteur Institute in 1991 with her Doctor of Medicine, followed by a residency at Assistance Publique – Hôpitaux de Paris, which is when she had her first child. She then completed a fellowship at the US National Institutes of Health. She returned to Paris Diderot University for a PhD in immunology, graduating in 1996.

== Career ==
In 1994, she accepted a position as an assistant professor in the department of pediatric gastroenterology at Necker–Enfants Malades Hospital, remaining through 1998. In 1999, she worked at Princeton University as a staff researcher, becoming a research scientist the following year. She accepted a position at the University of Chicago in 2002 as an assistant professor; she was promoted in 2005 to associate professor and in 2011 to full professor. In 2006, she became the co-director of its Digestive Disease Research Core Center and in 2011 she was made the director of research for its Celiac Disease Center. In 2018 she received a named professorship, becoming the Sara and Harold Lincoln Thompson Professor.

== Awards and honors ==
In 2009, she became the first researcher in the US to win the William K. Warren, Jr. Prize for Excellence in Celiac Disease Research. In 2017 she received the Lloyd Mayer Prize in Mucosal Immunology. She is also an elected member of the Association of American Physicians and a recipient of the Llewellyn John and Harriet Manchester Quantrell Award for Excellence in Undergraduate Education.

In 2017, she received the Quantrell Award.
