= Jean Comaroff =

American anthropologist

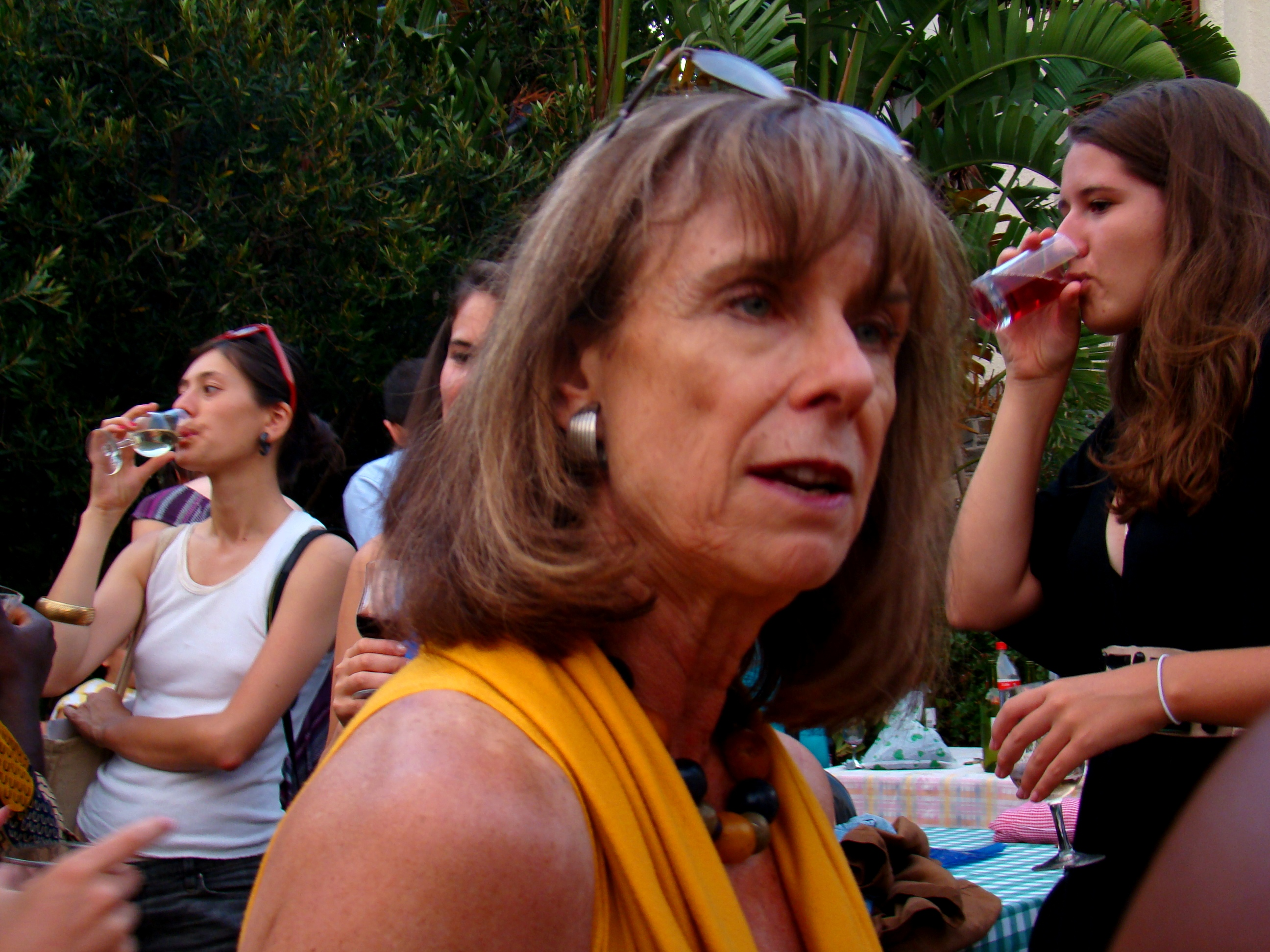
- Born: 22 July 1946 (age 80); Edinburgh, Scotland
- Education: University of Cape Town; London School of Economics
- Scientific career
- Fields: Anthropology
- Workplaces: University of Chicago; Harvard University

Jean Comaroff (born 22 July 1946) is an Alfred North Whitehead Research Professor of Anthropology and African American Studies at Harvard and former Oppenheimer Fellow in African Studies.

She is an expert on the effects of colonialism on people in Southern Africa. Until 2012, Jean was the Bernard E. & Ellen C. Sunny Distinguished Service Professor of Anthropology and of Social Sciences at the University of Chicago, Director of the Chicago Center for Contemporary Theory, and Honorary Professor of Anthropology at the University of Cape Town.

== Biography ==
Comaroff was born in Edinburgh, Scotland, shortly after World War II. Her father, a Jewish South African doctor, joined the British Army Medical Corps while studying abroad to specialize in obstetrics and gynecology. Her mother was a convert to Judaism, born to a Lutheran German family that had emigrated to South Africa in the late nineteenth century.

Comaroff's parents returned to South Africa when she was ten months old, settling in the highly segregated industrial town of Port Elizabeth. As the apartheid regime intensified, the family supported local political protest, her father participating in running a clinic at an underserved township, and her mother being involved in community work, including helping to run soup kitchens and night-school in black neighborhoods, and working with the elderly Jewish community.

She received her B.A. in 1966 from the University of Cape Town and her Ph.D. in 1974 from London School of Economics. She has been a University faculty member since 1978.

In collaboration with her husband John Comaroff, as well as on her own, Comaroff has written extensively on colonialism, and hegemony based on fieldwork conducted in southern Africa and Great Britain.

Comaroff also serves as a member of the Editorial Collective of the journal Public Culture, Journal of the Royal Anthropological Institute, American Anthropologist and Journal of Southern African Studies. Her first book, Body of Power, Spirit of Resistance: The Culture and History of a South African People was regarded as being “groundbreaking and compelling.. An important recent book that she wrote with John Comaroff is Theory from the South, which among other things covers "how Euro-America is evolving towards Africa."

Their co-written volume, The Truth About Crime contends that at crime and policing are ever more central to the changing nature of sovereignty as states privatize security and turn to non-state actors to manage social order.

== Career ==
Comaroff began her academic career as a Research Fellow in the Department of Sociology and Anthropology at the University College of Swansea, South Wales, from 1971 to 1973.

She subsequently served as a Lecturer in Anthropology at the Bolton Institute of Technology and in the Extra-Mural Studies Department at the University of Manchester between 1973 and 1974.

From 1976 to 1978, she held the position of Senior Research Fellow in Medical Sociology and Anthropology in the Department of Psychiatry at the University of Manchester.

In 1978, Comaroff joined the University of Chicago as an Assistant Professor of Anthropology and Social Sciences in the College, a position she held until 1984.

During this period, she was a Bunting Fellow at the Bunting Institute, Radcliffe College, Harvard University between 1981 and 1982. She was promoted to Associate Professor at the University of Chicago in 1984, and subsequently became a full Professor of Anthropology and Social Sciences in the College in 1987, a position she retained until 2012.

In 1988, she was appointed Directeur d'Études at the École des Hautes Études en Sciences Sociales in Paris, a role she held again in 1995. She was a Visiting Professor at Duke University in 1989, and served as an Honorary Senior Fellow at the International Centre for Contemporary Cultural Research at the University of Manchester from 1994 to 1995. From 1996 to 1999, she chaired the Department of Anthropology at the University of Chicago. That same year, she was named the Bernard E. and Ellen C. Sunny Distinguished Service Professor.

Between 1997 and 2004, she served as a member of the Core Faculty for the Clinical Scholars Program funded by the Robert Wood Johnson Foundation at the University of Chicago Medical School. She received the Quantrell Award for excellence in undergraduate teaching.

Her work also involved academic engagement in South Africa. She was a Visiting Research Associate at the University of the North West in 1999–2000, and has been an Honorary Professor of Anthropology at the University of Cape Town since 2004. In 2000, she was also a Visiting Professor at Tel Aviv University.

She was the Matina Horner Distinguished Visiting Professor at the Radcliffe Institute for Advanced Study, Harvard University in 2003; Visiting Lecturer at the University of Basel in 2005; Visiting Professor at the University of Vienna in 2007; and Distinguished Visiting Professor at the Center for African Studies, Oxford University in 2008.

In 2012, Comaroff transitioned to Harvard University, where she holds the title of Alfred North Whitehead Research Professor of African and African American Studies and Anthropology. She also became an Oppenheimer Research Fellow, and was appointed Faculty Associate at the Weatherhead Center for International Affairs in 2013. Additionally, she holds an ongoing position as Research Associate in the Department of Anthropology at the University of Chicago. Internationally, Comaroff was the J.Y. Pillay Visiting Professor at Yale-NUS College in Singapore during the fall semester of 2019, and a Contributing Faculty Member at the same institution in 2020.

== Scholarly work ==
Her scholarship has fundamentally reshaped the contours of contemporary social science, particularly in relation to the Global South. Her body of work, often produced in collaboration with John Comaroff. In Theory from the South: Or, How Euro-America is Evolving Toward Africa (2012), She and John Comaroff argue that attention to the Global South particularly Africa can yield new theoretical perspectives and political insights. They contend that the Global South not only provides valuable empirical observations regarding the dynamics of global modernity, but also serves as an important source of innovative concepts and frameworks for understanding world-making processes.

She also poses a provocative challenge to dominant narratives of progress and development: that Euro-America is no longer the privileged site of global futurity and that many features once presumed to be peripheral, pathological, or postcolonial in the South are in fact prefigurative of emergent conditions in the North. The assertion that Euro-America is evolving toward Africa serves not as a literal or empirical thesis, but as a conceptual provocation one that aims to disrupt the unidirectional flow of theory and history from North to South.

Comaroff’s methodology in this project is rooted in what she terms grounded theory: a historically contextualized, problem-driven mode of theorization that operates through a dialectical engagement between the inductive and the deductive, the empirical and the abstract, the everyday and the structural. Rather than treating theory as a set of universal principles abstracted from lived experience, Comaroff insists on a model of theorizing that emerges from within the social worlds under analysis. This approach draws from anthropology’s long tradition of field-based inquiry while resisting its tendencies toward cultural relativism or empiricist containment.

Comaroff interrogates wide-ranging phenomena personhood, sovereignty, citizenship, law, labor, liberal democracy, and violence situating them within broader processes of capitalist restructuring, racialization, and geopolitical reordering.

Comaroff’s scholarship centers on rethinking the relationship between theory and geography, advocating for theory from the Global South rather than solely about it. In works such as Theory from the South (2012, with John Comaroff), she argues that regions like Africa offer not only empirical insights but also conceptual resources for understanding global modernity. Her approach resists idealizing the South or inverting binary hierarchies, instead emphasizing theoretical openness, contingency, and heterogeneity.

Comaroff also critiques the contemporary state of theory in academia, calling for its reinvigoration as both an epistemic and political practice. Across her influential works including Body of Power, Spirit of Resistance and Ethnicity, Inc. she explores how law, religion, ethnicity, and violence function as sites of power in postcolonial contexts. Her recent work further engages with emerging Africa–China relations and advocates for a multipolar, polycentric theoretical landscape attentive to translocal entanglements and what she describes as analysis on “an awkward scale.”

== Personal life ==
In late 1960s, she and her husband, anthropologist John Comaroff moved to Great Britain to pursue a PhD in anthropology. Both Jean and John Comaroff were faculty members at the University of Chicago between 1979 and 2012.

Her son Joshua Comaroff and daughter Jane Anna Gordon are both academics, both writing quite extensively with their spouses, Ker-shing Ong and Lewis Riccardo Gordon respectively.

== Publications ==
- Comaroff, Jean (1985). Body of Power, Spirit of Resistance. University of Chicago Press. doi:10.7208/chicago/9780226160986.001.0001. ISBN 978-0-226-11423-1.
- Comaroff, Jean (2007-01-01). "Beyond Bare Life: AIDS, (Bio)Politics, and the Neoliberal Order". Public Culture. 19 (1): 197–219. doi:10.1215/08992363-2006-030. ISSN 0899-2363.
- Comaroff, Jean (2020-08-06). "Livingstone's Last Stand: The End of Development As We Know It?". Journal of Asian and African Studies. 55 (5): 636–642. doi:10.1177/0021909620937706.
- Comaroff, Jean (2024). "Religion and Intimacy". Philosophy and Global Affairs. 4 (1): 59–77. doi:10.5840/pga202472367. ISSN 2692-790X.

== Prizes ==
- Gordon Laing Prize, best book by a faculty member published by the University of Chicago Press [with John L. Comaroff]
- Harry J. Kalven, Jr. Prize for advancement of research in law and society.
- Anders Retzius Gold Medal from the Swedish Society for Anthropology and Geography.
- Best Special Issue award, Council of Editors of Learned Journals for “Millennial Capitalism and the Culture of Neoliberalism.” (Public Culture 12[2]).
- Quantrell Award

== Joint publications (with John Comaroff) ==
- 1991 Of Revelation and Revolution Vol I: Christianity, Colonialism, and Consciousness in South Africa. Chicago: University of Chicago Press.
- 1992 Ethnography and the Historical Imagination. Boulder: Westview Press.
- 1997 Of Revelation and Revolution Vol II: The Dialectics of Modernity on a South African Frontier. Chicago: University of Chicago Press.
- 2000 "Millennial Capitalism: First Thoughts on a Second Coming". Public Culture, 12(2): 291–343.
- 2006 Law and Disorder in the Postcolony (eds.) University of Chicago Press.
- 2006 ":The Portraits of an Ethnographer as a Young Man: The Photography of Isaac Schapera in 'Old Botswana'." Anthropology Today. 22(1):10-17.
- 2007 Picturing a Colonial Past: The African Photographs of Isaac Schapera. (eds. w/ D.A. James) University of Chicago Press.
- 2009 "Ethnicity, Inc". Chicago Studies in Practices of Meaning, University of Chicago Press (July 15, 2009)
- 2009 Dixit: Violencia y ley en la poscolonia: una reflexión sobre las complicidades Norte-Sur, Buenos Aires y Madrid, Katz Barpal Editores, ISBN 978-84-96859-56-2 (En coedición con el Centro de Cultura Contemporánea de Barcelona)
- 2011 "Twenty Years after Of Revelation and Revolution: An Interview with Jean Comaroff", Social Sciences and Missions (Leiden: Brill), vol.24(2-3), pp. 148–170
- 2012 Theory from the South: Or, How Euro-America is Evolving Toward Africa (The Radical Imagination). [Paradigm Publishers].
- Comaroff, Jean; Comaroff, John L. The Truth about Crime: Sovereignty, Knowledge, Social Order. Chicago, IL: University of Chicago Press.
- Comaroff, John L.; Comaroff, Jean (eds.). The Politics of Custom: Chiefship, Capital, and the State in Contemporary Africa. Chicago, IL: University of Chicago Press.
- Meiu, George Paul; Comaroff, Jean; Comaroff, John L., eds. (2020-08-04). Ethnicity, Commodity, In/Corporation. Indiana University Press. doi:10.2307/j.ctv12sdz39. ISBN 978-0-253-04796-0.
