= Fredrik Albritton Jonsson =

American historian

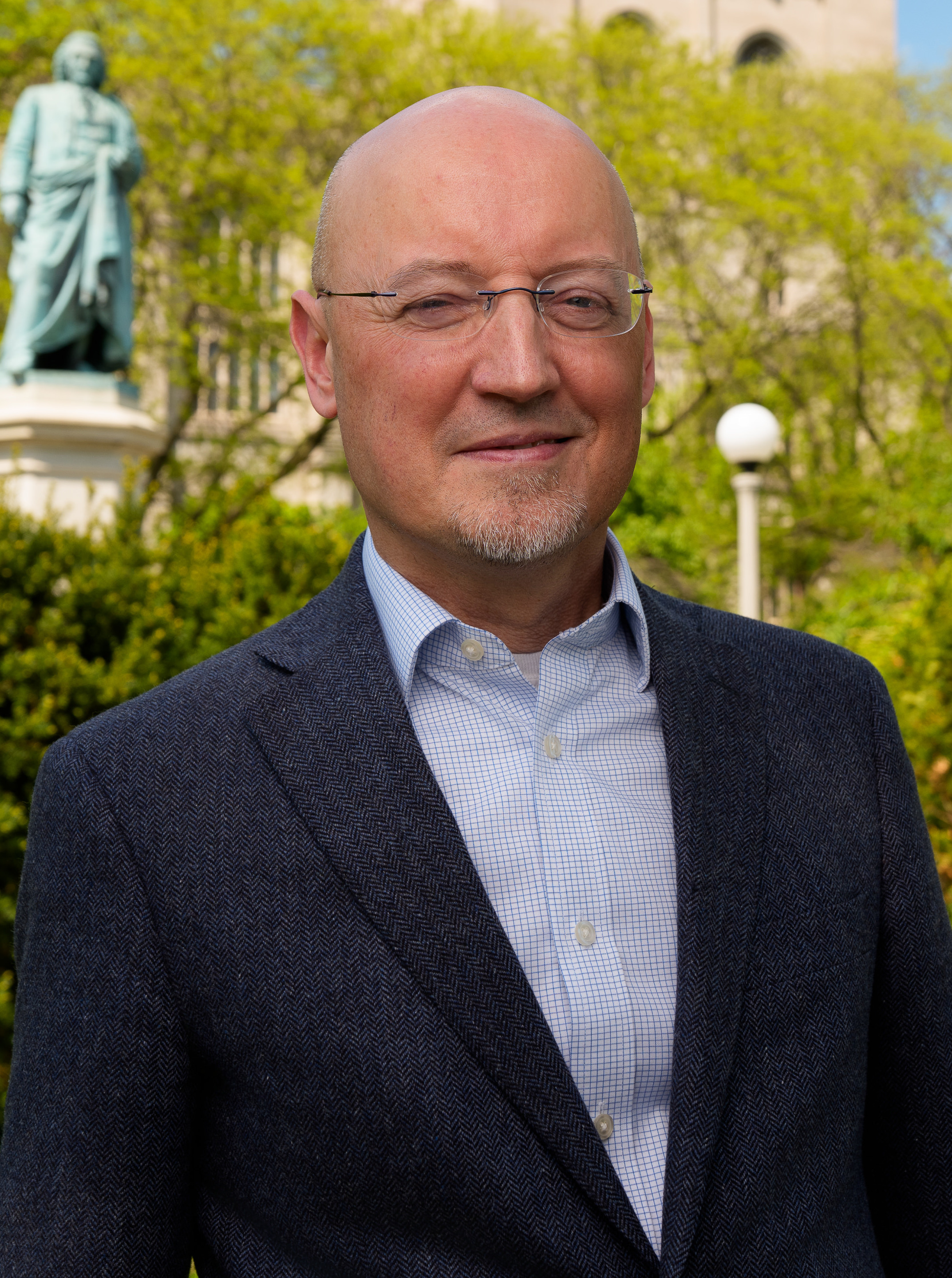
- Professor Jonsson in 2026
- Title: Associate Professor of History

Academic background
- Education: University of Cambridge (MPhil); University of Chicago (PhD)

Academic work
- Discipline: History
- Sub-discipline: Environmental history History of science and technology Political economy
- Institutions: University of Chicago
- Main interests: British history The Enlightenment; Cornucopianism; Fossil fuel

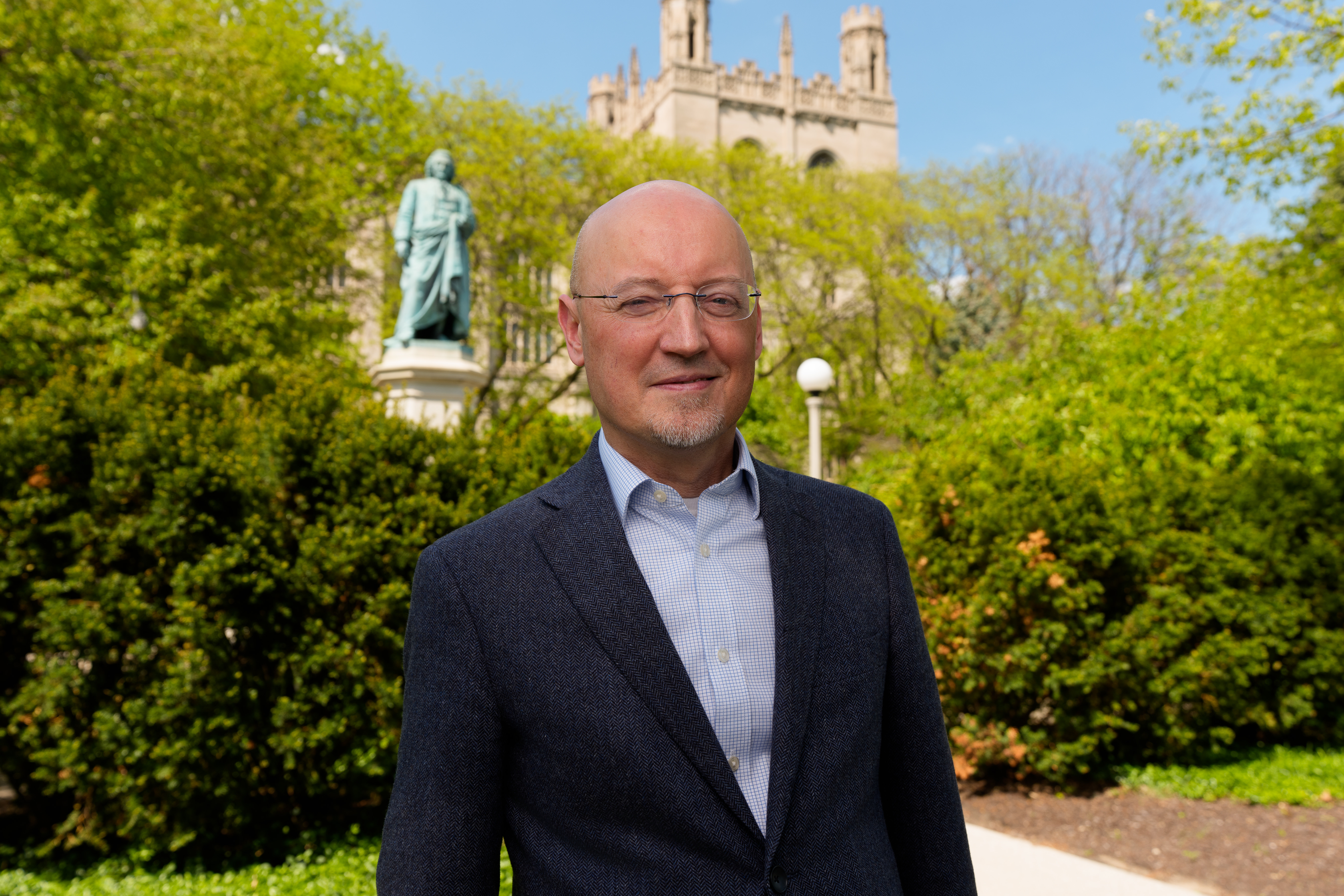
Fredrik Albritton Jonsson. May 4, 2026. Photographer Jason Smith

Fredrik Albritton Jonsson (b 1972) is an associate professor of history and chair of the Committee on Environment, Geography and Urbanization (CEGU) at the University of Chicago. He is the Author of Enlightenment's Frontier: The Scottish Highlands and the Origins of Environmentalism and the coauthor, with Vicky Albritton, of Green Victorians: The Simple Life in John Ruskin's Lake District. He is coauthor, with Carl Wennerlind, of Scarcity: A History from the Origins of Capitalism to the Climate Crisis. With Frank Trentmann, John Brewer and Neil Fromer, he is the editor of Scarcity in the Modern World: History, Politics, Society and Sustainability 1800-2075. With Rachael Osborn, Mark Fiege and Will Wright, he authored an amicus brief of environmental historians for Juliana v. United States. He currently serves as the co-editor of The Journal of Modern History. He is also Associate Editor of the journal Anthropocene History. He received the Quantrell Award in 2026.
