= Marvin Zonis =

American economist (1936–2020)

Marvin Zonis (September 18, 1936 – November 15, 2020) was an American political economist who focused on Middle Eastern politics and history and an emeritus professor at the University of Chicago Booth School of Business, where he taught courses on international political economy, leadership, and e-commerce. He was the first professor at the Business School to teach a course on digital technologies.

== Education and career ==
He was educated at Yale University, the Harvard Business School, the Massachusetts Institute of Technology, where he received a Ph.D. in political science, and the Chicago Institute for Psychoanalysis, where he received training in psychoanalysis.

Zonis also consulted to corporations and professional asset management firms throughout the world, helping them to identify, assess, and manage their political risks. Zonis was a member of the Board of Directors of CNA Financial, the global insurance and financial services firm, and was also on the Board of Advisors of Syntek Capital, a European Private Equity Venture Capital Firm focusing on TMT (telecom, media and technology). He was a member of the Board of Advisers for the Comptroller General of the United States at the GAO and also a Fellow of PwC-Diamond Advisory Services, and a member of the Board of Directors of the Fondation des États-Unis, Paris, and the Board of Advisers of the Centre for Business Management, Queen Mary University of London. He was also a prominent member of the International Society of Political Psychology.

Zonis wrote extensively on globalization, digital technologies, emerging markets, Middle East politics, the oil industry, Russia, and U.S. foreign policy. He was a leading authority on the Middle East, and spent most of his life studying the volatile mix of Islam, terrorism, and the Middle East. In his youth he lived in Iran, hitchhiked through Afghanistan, studied Islam in Iraq and travelled extensively throughout other parts of the region as well.

He received the Quantrell Award.

== Death ==
Zonis died on November 15, 2020.

== Select publications ==
- The Kimchi Matters: Global Business and Local Politics in a Crisis-Driven World
- The East European Opportunity: The Complete Business Guide and Sourcebook 1992 Zonis and co-author Dwight Semler here outlined business opportunities in six Eastern European countries during the post-Soviet transition. Designed to provide business travellers with a concise reference, this guide provides information on the geography, historical background, economy and present political status of Poland, Romania, Yugoslavia, Bulgaria, Czechoslovakia and Hungary.
- Majestic Failure: The Fall of the Shah

This is a psychoanalytic and historical portrait of the late Shah of Iran Mohammad Reza Pahlavi (1919–1980) whom Zonis knew personally. Zonis contends that as the Shah's core psychological relationships failed in the 1970s he regressed into his essential passivity and dependence, making him incapable of facing the challenge from the Iranian Revolution. The main sources of the Shah's psychic support that maintained his psychic equilibrium were the admiration of his subjects, several friendships dating from childhood, a belief in special divine protection, and his alliance with the U.S. government. The range of psychoanalytic interpretation in the book is wide-ranging and fine-grained; while one chapter examines his relationships with his father and mother, another looks at the Shah's obsessions with flying and heights, While he was much closer to his mother, the Shah only mentions her 12 times in the first volume of his autobiography while he references his father 784 times.

- The Political Elite of Iran

Zonis' first published book is an examination of the political class of Iran up until the late 1960s. Zonis studied not only those who held formal office, but identified approximately 3,000 people who exercised significant influence over the allocation of resources and values. He classified the ten percent of this group who exercised the most influence as his data universe. The interactions between the Shah and this group were then investigated. Zonis managed to interview a large cross section of this elite group. He concluded that the longer members of this elite group of 300 participated in the Shah's political system, the more likely they were to exhibit attributes of insecurity, cynicism, and mistrust.
