= Jonathan R. Lyon =

American historian of medieval Europe

Jonathan R. Lyon is an American historian of medieval Europe. He is a professor of history at the University of Vienna.

Lyon previously taught at the University of Chicago from 2022-2024. He received the Quantrell Award for Excellence in Undergraduate Teaching.

== Bibliography ==
- Princely Brothers and Sisters: The Sibling Bond in German Politics, 1100-1250, Cornell University Press, 2012
- Corruption, Protection and Justice in Medieval Europe: A Thousand-Year History, Cambridge University Press, 2022
