= Edward Garber =

American geneticist

Edward David Garber (1918 – October 9, 2004) was an American geneticist.

== Biography ==
Garber was born into a family of modest means in 1918 in Manhattan, New York City and died on October 9, 2004, in the Palliative Care Center and Hospice of the North Shore in Skokie, IL at the age of 86. His death was due to kidney failure.

Garber was raised in a coldwater flat in Manhattan's Lower East Side. He was admitted to Townsend Harris High School, a selective public school, and received a New York state grant with partial tuition waiver to study at Cornell University, graduating in 1940 with a bachelor's degree in botany. He earned his MS in genetics in 1942, and his PhD in genetics in 1949, both from the University of California, Berkeley. He studied under the auspices of the GI Bill. He was awarded the John Belling Prize for his PhD dissertation on the genetics of Sorghum, which is the first publication he is known to have authored. He married Rosalie Kirshtein, who died in 2013; and had two daughters Martha and Jane, a son Joel, and two grandchildren, Beckey and Matt.

In 1982, he received the Quantrell Award.

He served in the Army during World War II, during which time he was stationed in Charleston, South Carolina. Until his realization that he wanted to be an academician, he worked for several years at the Office of Naval Research in Oakland. CA

== Area of study ==
While working for the Office of Naval Research in Oakland, CA, he studied: the causative agent of plague i.e. Pateurella pestis (now Yersinia pestis), bacterial variation and the resulting resistance to streptomycin in vitro and in vivo, and sex linkage in mice.

Garber started his academic career in 1953 as a faculty member of the Botany Department, University of Chicago; he reached mandatory retirement age in 1988, but stayed on as Professor Emeritus of Ecology and Evolution. During his career, he made significant contributions in the field of genetics. His work encompassed higher plants (Sorghum, peas, Collinsia), lower plants (algae, liverworts), animals (mice, carp, Homo sapiens), bacteria (Erwinia, Pseudomonas, Xanthomonas), and fungi (Aspergillus, Colletotrichum, Fusarium, Penicillium, Microbotrytum). He experimented extensively on mold systems, spending nearly three decades working on filamentous fungi. He wrote more than 150 papers, books, and reviews. He carried out studies on the development of streptomycin resistance in Pasteurellas pestis. While a member of the University of Chicago faculty, he taught genetics, and supervised eleven (11) Master's theses and twenty (20) PhD dissertations. He mentored the MS thesis and the PhD dissertation of mycologist Joan W. Bennett, and likewise for geneticist Michael L. Baird and fungal biochemist Regnal J. Jones. In 1982, Garber was honored with the University of Chicago's Quantrell Award for excellence in undergraduate teaching. He also worked with Richard J. Boyajian of the University of Chicago Laboratory Schools to develop a human genetics curriculum for the Chicago Public Schools, and participated in the design of the sickle cell anemia exhibit at Chicago's Museum of Science and Industry.

His multi-faceted work illustrated the power of classical genetics. One primary area of his research focused on the Collinsia genus. Another primary area of his research focused on several smut species (Microbotryum violeceum) formerly Ustilago violacea. From 1960 on, he studied the filamentous fungi, Aspergillus fumigatus, Fusarium oxysporium, Penicillium digitatum, P. expansum and P. italicum, describing the parasexual cycle in them and also analyzing the relationship between nutrition and phytopathogenicity. He was one of the first researchers to use enzyme electrophoresis as a taxonomic and genetic tool for mycological studies.

In addition to working as a plant/fungal cytogeneticist, he did research in the area of medical science. He, along with John W. Rippon, Professor Emeritus at the University of Chicago, undertook pioneering enzymologic studies of dermatophytes. These studies associated the yield of elastase and collagenase with the more virulent forms of dermatophytes, and established that the production of specific enzymes correlated with defined mating types. He collaborated with his University of Chicago colleague Manfred Ruddat for more than 30 years, resulting in numerous scientific papers. The University of Chicago Medical and Biological Science Alumni Association conferred its Gold Key Award on Garber in 1992.

Garber wrote a textbook titled Cytogenetics: An Introduction, published by McGraw Hill (1972). He served as editor for Genetic Perspectives in Biology and Medicine, (University of Chicago Press) in 1985. He was the co-editor-in-chief of the International Journal of Plant Sciences (University of Chicago Press) from 1992-2000. He also spent time at the University of Hebrew in Jerusalem, under the auspices of the United States-Israel Binational Science Foundation, where he was involved in studies such as: how prawns flourished in brackish water ponds, the breeding of hybrid carp, and the use of yeast as a human food supplement.

== Main publications ==
- Genetic perspectives in biology and medicine
- Genetics of Ustilago violacea
- Genetics of phytopathogenic fungi
- Cytotaxonomic studies in the genus Sorghum
- The host as a growth medium
- A nutrition-inhibition hypothesis of pathogenicity
- The virulence of biochemical mutants of Erwinia aroideae for varieties of radish and turnip
