= Jason Merchant =

Linguist and academic administrator

Academic background
- Education: Yale University (BA); University of California, Santa Cruz (PhD)
- Thesis: The syntax of silence (1999)

Academic work
- Discipline: Linguistics

Jason Merchant is the Lorna Puttkammer Straus Distinguished Service Professor of Linguistics and Vice Provost for Academic Affairs at the University of Chicago, as well as Faculty Director of UChicagoGRAD, where he is the University's functional equivalent to a dean of a graduate school. His portfolio includes overseeing the University's commitment to the principled institutional neutrality articulated in the Kalven Report.

== Education and career ==
Merchant earned his PhD in linguistics at the University of California, Santa Cruz in 1999, and his BA summa cum laude in linguistics (with distinction in the major) at Yale University in 1991, where he was elected to Phi Beta Kappa as a junior and served as undergraduate vice president. He held postdoctoral fellowships at Northwestern University and the University of Groningen, prior to joining the University of Chicago in 2001. Merchant became Vice Provost in 2018, having previously served as chair of the linguistics department, chair of the department of Slavic languages and literatures, and as deputy dean of the humanities.

As vice provost, he oversees all academic appointments at the University of Chicago, and is responsible for academic affairs, where he reviews all academic hires, promotions, tenure cases, and retentions, and is also responsible for academic governance, serving as the vice provost for the Council of the Senate. His work has included adjudicating claims of academic misconduct and fraud; he was instrumental in granting a PhD to a chemistry student 48 years after her department failed to support her when her advisor died. He also serves on the University's Scholars at Risk committee, which has brought scholars out of war zones to work at the University of Chicago.

Merchant has served on the board of the University of Chicago Graham School, the College Council, and as the faculty president of the University of Chicago's chapter of Phi Beta Kappa. He created a new undergraduate Core course sequence for the University's Core curriculum, Language and the Human, and chaired the sequence from 2007-2008 and 2010-2013.

Merchant is a member of the Linguistic Society of America, where he has served as chair of the Nominating Committee, and as chair of the Leonard Bloomfield Award committee.

== Awards and fellowships ==
Merchant has been a Fulbright fellow at Utrecht University, a Deutscher Akademischer Austauschdienst (DAAD) fellow at the University of Tübingen, and an Onassis Fellow at the University of Thessaloniki. In 2012, he was awarded the Llewellyn John and Harriet Manchester Quantrell Award for Excellence in Undergraduate Teaching and in 2019 the Distinguished Graduate Student Alumni Award from the University of California, Santa Cruz.

== Research ==
Merchant is a linguist who has worked on the syntax and semantics of ellipsis, grammatical systems of case and agreement in a variety of languages, lexical selection, allomorphy, bilingual grammars, and on historical semantics and legal interpretation; his primary languages of investigation are the Germanic languages, Romance, Slavic, and Greek.

His most cited work is The Syntax of Silence, which analyzes the intersection of unbounded grammatical (A') dependencies and ellipsis in sluicing. The book has been called “a major contribution to our understanding of ellipsis” and “the most important work on the sluicing ellipsis construction since Ross's seminal 1969 article.”

Merchant is among the 30 most cited syntacticians in the world.

== Selected publications ==
- The syntax of silence: Sluicing, islands, and the theory of ellipsis. Oxford University Press, 2001.
- Sluicing: Cross-linguistic explorations. (ed. with Andrew Simpson). Oxford University Press, 2010.
- Voice and ellipsis. Linguistic Inquiry 44.1, 77-108 (2013).
- How much context is enough? Two cases of span-conditioned stem allomorphy. Linguistic Inquiry 46.2, 273-303 (2015).
- Roots don’t select, categorial heads do: Lexical-selection of PPs may vary by category. The Linguistic Review 36.3, 325-341 (2019).
