= Edward Wasiolek =

American literary scholar (1924–2018)

Edward Wasiolek (April 27, 1924 – May 3, 2018) was an American literary scholar.

Born in Camden, New Jersey on April 27, 1924, Wasiolek served in the United States Navy Reserve between 1943 and 1946, after which he enrolled at Rutgers University, where he obtained a bachelor's degree. Wasiolek completed his master's degree and doctorate at Harvard University, then joined the University of Chicago faculty in 1955. He received the Quantrell Award. In 1983, Wasiolek was awarded a Guggenheim Fellowship. He was later appointed Avalon Foundation Distinguished Service Professor of Slavic Languages and Literatures, and granted emeritus status in 1996. He died on May 3, 2018, aged 94.
