= Sluicing =

Syntactic phenomenon

In syntax, sluicing is a type of ellipsis that occurs in both direct and indirect interrogative clauses. The ellipsis is introduced by a wh-expression, whereby in most cases, everything except the wh-expression is elided from the clause. Sluicing has been studied in detail in the early 21st century and it is therefore a relatively well-understood type of ellipsis. Sluicing occurs in many languages.

== Basic examples ==
Sluicing is illustrated with the following examples. In each case, an embedded question is understood though only a question word or phrase is pronounced. (The intended interpretations of the question-denoting elliptical clause are given in parentheses; parts of these are anaphoric to the boldface material in the antecedent.)

Phoebe ate something, but she doesn't know what. (=what she ate)
Jon doesn't like the lentils, but he doesn't know why. (=why he doesn't like the lentils)
Someone has eaten the soup. Unfortunately, I don't know who. (=who has eaten the soup)

Sluicing in these examples occurs in indirect questions. It is also frequent in direct questions across speakers, e.g.

Somebody is coming for dinner tonight. - Who? (=Who is coming for dinner tonight)?
They put something in the mailbox. - What? (=What did they put in the mailbox)?

The examples of sluicing above have the sluiced material following its antecedent. This material can also precede its antecedent, e.g.

I don't know why, but the pictures have been moved. (=why the pictures have been moved)
When and how is unclear, but somebody should say something. (=when and how somebody should say something)

Merchant states that these and other examples of sluicing can be organized into four categories of sluicing constructions. These types include sluices with adjunct wh-phrases, sluices with overt correlates, sluices with implicit arguments and contrast sluices. The first type refers to when the wh-phrase does not have an elided copy of the antecedent but is an adjunct.

Zayd rāḥ, lakǝn ma-adri mita/wein.
Zayd left.3MS but NEG-know.1S when/where
"Zayd left, but I don’t know when/where."

The second type refers to a correlate in the antecedent clause that is indefinite. This is shown in the above example about someone eating the soup, with ‘someone’ being the indefinite correlate of ‘who’. The third type of sluicing construction refers to when the wh-word is not referring to a term in the antecedent but is referring to an object that corresponds to the preceding verb.

Fatema təqra, lakǝn ma-ʕaraf eiš.
Fatema read.3FS but NEG-know.1S what
"Fatema is reading, but I don’t know what."

The final type of sluicing construction occurs when the elided material correspondent contrasts that of what is in the antecedent.

Zayd ʕand-ah walad, lakǝn ma-adri kam bent.
Zayd has.3MS son but NEG-know.1S how.many daughter
"Zayd has a son, but I don’t know how many daughters."

== Theoretical approaches to sluicing ==
There are two theoretical approaches that have been proposed for how sluicing occurs in languages. John R. Ross is the first examination of sluicing; he argued that sluicing involves regular wh-fronting followed by deletion of the sister constituent of the wh-phrase. This analysis has been expanded in greater detail by Jason Merchant, the most comprehensive treatise on sluicing to date. A second kind of analysis presents nonstructural analyses of ellipsis and does not posit unpronounced elliptical material. Yet another account of sluicing builds on the catena unit; the elided material is a catena.

== Movement approach ==
The movement approach states that sluicing is a product of the syntactic derivation in which an embedded clause is built in the syntax and then the wh-phrase within the embedded clause moves outside of the constituent to the position of SpecCP (specifier to the complementizer phrase). These steps are then followed by the deletion (and therefore non-pronunciation) of the tense phrase node that contains the rest of the clause. Evidence for this approach is seen in the connectivity effects of case marking, binding and preposition stranding as outlined by Merchant

== Case-marking in sluicing ==
Interrogative phrases in languages with morphological case-marking show the case appropriate to the understood verb as Ross and Merchant illustrated here with the German verb "schmeicheln" (to flatter), which governs the dative case on its object.

Er hat jemandem geschmeichelt, aber ich weiß nicht, wem.
he has someone.DAT flattered but I know not who.DAT
"He flattered someone, but I don't know who."

The sluiced wh-phrase must bear the same case that its counterpart in a non-elided structure would bear.

== Preposition-stranding in sluicing ==
It has been concluded that languages that forbid preposition-stranding in question formation also forbid it in sluicing, as the following German example shows:

Er hat mit jemandem gesprochen, aber ich weiß nicht, *(mit) wem.
he has with someone spoken but I know not with who
"He spoke with someone, but I don't know (with) who."

Examples of languages in which p-stranding does not occur are Greek, German, and Russian.

Much research has been done to determine if sluicing can allow for preposition-stranding in a non-preposition-stranding language. Stjepanović conducted research on whether that is possible in Serbo-Croatian, a non-preposition-stranding language. She concluded that there is not enough evidence to contradict the initial claim made by Ross. However, she found that a preposition may be lost or removed from a sentence under sluicing in Serbo-Croatian. More research is to be conducted to confirm the official cause of the loss of preposition.

Petar je sakrio igradku ispod jedne stolice i pored jednog zida, ali ne znam (ispod) koje stolice i (pored) kojeg zida.
Petar is hidden toy under one chair.GEN and beside one wall.GEN but not I.know under which chair.GEN and beside which wall.GEN
Petar hid the toy under a chair and beside a wall, but I don't know which chair and which wall.'

== Binding ==
Jason Merchant demonstrates that binding supports the movement approach using the following sentence:

Every linguist_{1} criticized some of his_{1} work, but I’m not sure how much of his_{1} work ~~[every linguist_{1} criticized t]~~

In order for the second “his work” to refer to “every linguist” in the above example, it must be c-commanded by its antecedent within its local domain. Here, “his work” could not be coreferential with the subject: “every linguist” at the beginning of the sentence because it is outside of its local domain. This provides evidence that “his work” originally started off in the elided constituent where it could be c-commanded and in the local domain of that “every linguist” before it moved out of the clause.

== Non-movement approach ==
There are also several theoretical approaches to sluicing that do not involve the movement of the wh-phrase out of the embedded clause. These approaches include PF deletion and LF copying. PF deletion as proposed by Howard Lasnik states that the TP within the embedded clause is null and has syntactic structure within it that is elided following a wh-movement operation. The other approach, LF copying, is a process proposed by Anne Lobeck in which the original structure of a sluicing phrase is one in which the wh-word originates in the SpecCP position of the embedded clause and a null phrase marker (marked e) occupies the position of the tense phrase of the embedded clause. This is the extent of the syntactic derivation. After this structure is derived, it is sent off for semantic interpretation, to logical form, in which the implied material in the tense phrase is then present for our full understanding of the sentence. The evidence for this approach is that it is able to account for islands in sluicing as is discussed below.

== Islands in sluicing ==
Sluicing has garnered considerable attention because it appears, as John R. Ross first discussed, to allow wh-fronting to violate the island conditions he discovered:

They want to hire someone who speaks a Balkan language, but I don't remember which one. (=*which one they want to hire someone who speaks)

Sluicing allows a sentence that contains an island to retain its meaning and remain grammatical. As mentioned by Klaus Abels, there is an ongoing debate on whether this can happen in all situations or if it is island-dependent.

A biography of one of the Marx brothers will be published later this year; guess which one (=*which one of the Marx brothers a biography of will be published later this year)!

The first example is ungrammatical because the island prevents us from moving anything out of the subject constituent. The second example is saved through sluicing as the island is sluiced and the meaning can be inferred from the context of the sentence, therefore maintaining the meaning and remaining grammatical.

== Multiple sluicing ==
In some languages, sluicing can leave behind more than one wh-phrase (multiple remnant sluicing):

Someone wants to eat something. ?I wish I knew who what. (=who wants to eat what)

?Something is causing someone big problems, although it's not clear what who. (=what is causing who big problems)

Sentences like these are considered acceptable in languages like German, Japanese, Chinese, Turkish, Russian, and others, although in English, their acceptability seems marginal. Lasnik discusses the fact that the wh-phrase remnants in multiple sluicing must be clausemates:

*Someone told me that something broke, but I don't remember who what. (≠who told me that what broke)

== Issues with different approaches to sluicing ==
Only the catena-based approach handles multiple sluicing without further elaboration. The structural movement analysis must rely on some other type of movement to evacuate the noninitial wh-phrase from the ellipsis site; proposals for this additional movement include extraposition or shifting and need to be able to account for islands in sluicing. The nonstructural analysis must add phrase-structure rules to allow an interrogative clause to consist of multiple wh-phrases and be able to account for connectivity effects. The catena-based approach, however, does not account for the locality facts; since catenae can span multiple clauses, the fact that multiply-sluiced wh-phrases must be clausemates is a mystery.

== Sluicing in other languages ==
=== Omani Arabic ===
Sluicing has also been analyzed in Omani Arabic. All four of the above stated sluicing constructions outlined by Merchant are accounted for in Omani Arabic.

Sluices with Adjunct Wh-Phrases

Zayd rāḥ, lakǝn ma-adri mita/wein.
Zayd left.3MS but NEG-know.1S when/where
"Zayd left, but I don’t know when/where."

Sluices with Overt Correlates

Zaid qabǝl ḥad, lakǝn ma-aʕraf mi:n.
Zaid met.3MS someone but NEG-know.1S who
"Zaid met someone, but I don’t know who."

Sluices with Implicit Arguments

Fatema təqra, lakǝn ma-ʕaraf eiš.
Fatema read.3FS but NEG-know.1S what
"Fatema is reading, but I don’t know what."

Contrast Sluices

Zayd ʕand-ah walad, lakǝn ma-adri kam bent.
Zayd has.3MS son but NEG-know.1S how.many daughter
"Zayd has a son, but I don’t know how many daughters."

=== Danish ===
The following example displays sluicing in Danish:

Peter har snakket med en eller anden, men jeg ved ikke hvem.
Peter has talked with one or another but I know not who.
"Peter has talked with someone, but I don't know who."

=== German ===
The following example displays sluicing in German:

Hans will jemandem helfen, aber ich weiß nicht wem.
Hans wants someone help but I know not whom.
"Hans wants to help someone, but I don't know whom."

=== Japanese ===
The following example from displays sluicing in Japanese.

Abby-ga dareka-o mi-ta ga, watashi-wa dare ka wakaranai.
Abby-NOM someone-ACC see-PAST but I-TOP who Q know.not
"Abby saw someone, but I don’t know who."

=== Korean ===
The following example displays sluicing in Korean:

Mimi-ka khu-n cha-lul sa-ss-nuntey, elmana khu-nci molukeyssta
Mimi-NOM big-MOD car-ACC buy-PAST-but how big-Q.COMP not.know
Mimi bought a big car, but I don’t know how big.

== See also ==
- Ellipsis (linguistics)
- Verb phrase ellipsis
