= Rosalie Hankey Wax =

American anthropologist

- Born: November 4, 1911; Des Plaines, Illinois, U.S.
- Died: 1998 (aged 86–87)
- Education: PhD from University of Chicago in 1950
- Spouse: Murray Wax (1949-1987)
- Scientific career
- Fields: Anthropology
- Institutions: Emory University; University of Chicago; University of Kansas; Washington University in St. Louis

Rosalie Wax (1911 – 1998) was a noted American Anthropologist who during the second world war researched interned Japanese-Americans and later Native Americans. She taught at the University of Chicago, University of Kansas and at Washington University. She received the Quantrell Award.

== Selected publications ==
- Wax, R. (1971). Doing fieldwork: Warnings and advice. University of Chicago Press.
- Wax, Murray, and Rosalie Wax. (1963) "The notion of magic." Current Anthropology 4, no. 5 495–518.
- Wax, R. H., & Thomas, R. K. (1961). American Indians and white people. Phylon. 22(4), 305–317.
- Wax, R. (1952). Field methods and techniques: Reciprocity as a field technique. Human Organization, 11(3), 34–37.
- Wax, R. H. (1979). Gender and age in fieldwork and fieldwork education: No good thing is done by any man alone. Social Problems, 26(5), 509–522.
