= Berthold Hoeckner =

German musicologist

Berthold Hoeckner is a German musicologist who serves as the J. W. Van Gorkom Professor and Department Chair of Music at the University of Notre Dame. He was educated at the Musikhochschule Cologne, University of Cologne, and King's College London before earning his doctorate from Cornell University in 1994. Hoeckner grew up in Olpe, Germany.

Hoeckner specializes in nineteenth- and twentieth-century music, aesthetics, Theodor Adorno, music and literature, film music and visual culture, and the psychology and neuroscience of music. Hoeckner has received numerous awards and fellowships, including the Alfred Einstein Prize from the American Musicological Society in 1998, a Mellon New Directions Fellowship from the Andrew Mellon Foundation in 2006-2007, and a research fellowship from the Alexander von Humboldt Foundation in 2001-2002. Before coming to Notre Dame, he taught at the University of Chicago from 1994 to 2021, where he served as resource faculty for the Cinema and Media Studies Department, and Germanic Studies Department, and on the faculty of the Scherer Center for the Study of American Culture. He received the Quantrell Award.

== Books and selected articles ==
- "Elsa Screams or the Birth of Music Drama.” Cambridge Opera Journal (1997)
- “Schumann and Romantic Distance.” Journal of the American Musicological Society (1997)
- “Poet's Love and Composer's Love.” Music Theory Online (2001)
- Programming the Absolute: Nineteenth-Century German Music and the Hermeneutics of the Moment (Princeton University Press 2002)
- “Homage to Adorno's ‘Homage to Zerlina’.” Musical Quarterly (2004)
- Apparitions: New Perspectives on Adorno and Twentieth-Century Music (Editor - Routledge 2006)
- “Paths through Dichterliebe.” Nineteenth-Century Music (2006)
- “Audiovisual Memory: Transport and Transportation.” In Beyond the Soundtrack: Representing Music in Cinema (Richard Leppert, Lawrence Kramer, and Daniel Goldmark, Editors - University of California Press 2007)
- Film, Music, Memory (University of Chicago Press 2019)
