= Jan E. Goldstein =

American intellectual historian (born 1946)

Jan Ellen Goldstein (born 1946) is an American intellectual historian of Modern Europe. She is the Norman and Edna Freehling Professor of History at the University of Chicago, and co-editor of the Journal of Modern History.

== Scholarship ==
Goldstein obtained her Ph.D. from Columbia University in 1978. Her academic interests include:

- French intellectual and cultural history from the 18th through the 20th centuries
- History of the human sciences (Psychiatry and Psychoanalysis)
- Philosophical conceptions of selfhood and the self
- Historical methodology

Her books include Console and Classify, about the birth and development of the French psychiatric profession in the 19th century, which has become a classic in its field. More recently, Goldstein published The Post-Revolutionary Self: Politics and Psyche in France, 1750–1850, which charts the competition among several French schools of philosophical psychology that vied to replace Sensationalism in the late 18th century.

She has also worked as editor on a volume of the University of Chicago's Readings in Western Civilization series, 19th Century Europe: Liberalism and its Critics, a collection of primary source documents used in the History of European Civilization core sequence in the College.

== Editorship and other activities ==
She has served since 1996 as co-editor of the Journal of Modern History, the leading journal of intellectual, cultural and political history of Modern Europe. The post is shared by University of Chicago historians John W. Boyer and Fredrik Albritton Jonsson.

Goldstein was a named a Guggenheim fellow in 1992. In 2010, she was named a fellow of the American Academy of Arts and Sciences.

She was elected president of the American Historical Association for 2014–2015. She received the Quantrell Award.

== Select publications ==
- Hysteria Complicated by Ecstasy: The Case of Nanette Leroux (Princeton University Press, 2010).
- The Post-Revolutionary Self: Politics and Psyche in France, 1750–1850 (Harvard University Press, 2005).
- Console and Classify: The French Psychiatric Profession in the Nineteenth Century. (Cambridge University Press, 1987) French translation, 1997. 2nd ed. with new afterword (University of Chicago Press, 2001).
- "Of Marx and Marksmanship: Reflections on the Linguistic Construction of Class in Some Recent Historical Scholarship," Modern Intellectual History, 2 (2005): 87–107.
- "Bringing the Psyche into Scientific Focus: A Political Account," in Theodore Porter and Dorothy Ross, eds., The Cambridge History of Science, vol. 7: The Modern Social Sciences (Cambridge University Press, 2003), pp. 131–153.
- "The Case History in Historical Perspective: Nanette Leroux and Emmy von N.," in Muriel Dimen and Adrienne Harris, eds., Storms in Her Head: Freud and the Construction of Hysteria (New York: Other Press, 2001), pp. 143–167.
- "The Future of French History in the United States: Unapocalyptic Thoughts for the New Millennium," French Historical Studies 24:2 (Winter 2001): 1–10.
- "Mutations of the Self in Old Regime and Post-Revolutionary France: From Ame to Moi to Le Moi," in Lorraine Daston. ed., Biographies of Scientific Objects (University of Chicago Press, 2000), pp. 86–116.
- "Framing Discipline with Law: Problems and Promises of the Liberal State," American Historical Review 98:2 (April 1993): 364–375.
- "The Hysteria Diagnosis and the Politics of Anticlericalism in Late Nineteenth-Century France," Journal of Modern History Vol. 54, No. 2, June 1982.
