= Howard Nusbaum =

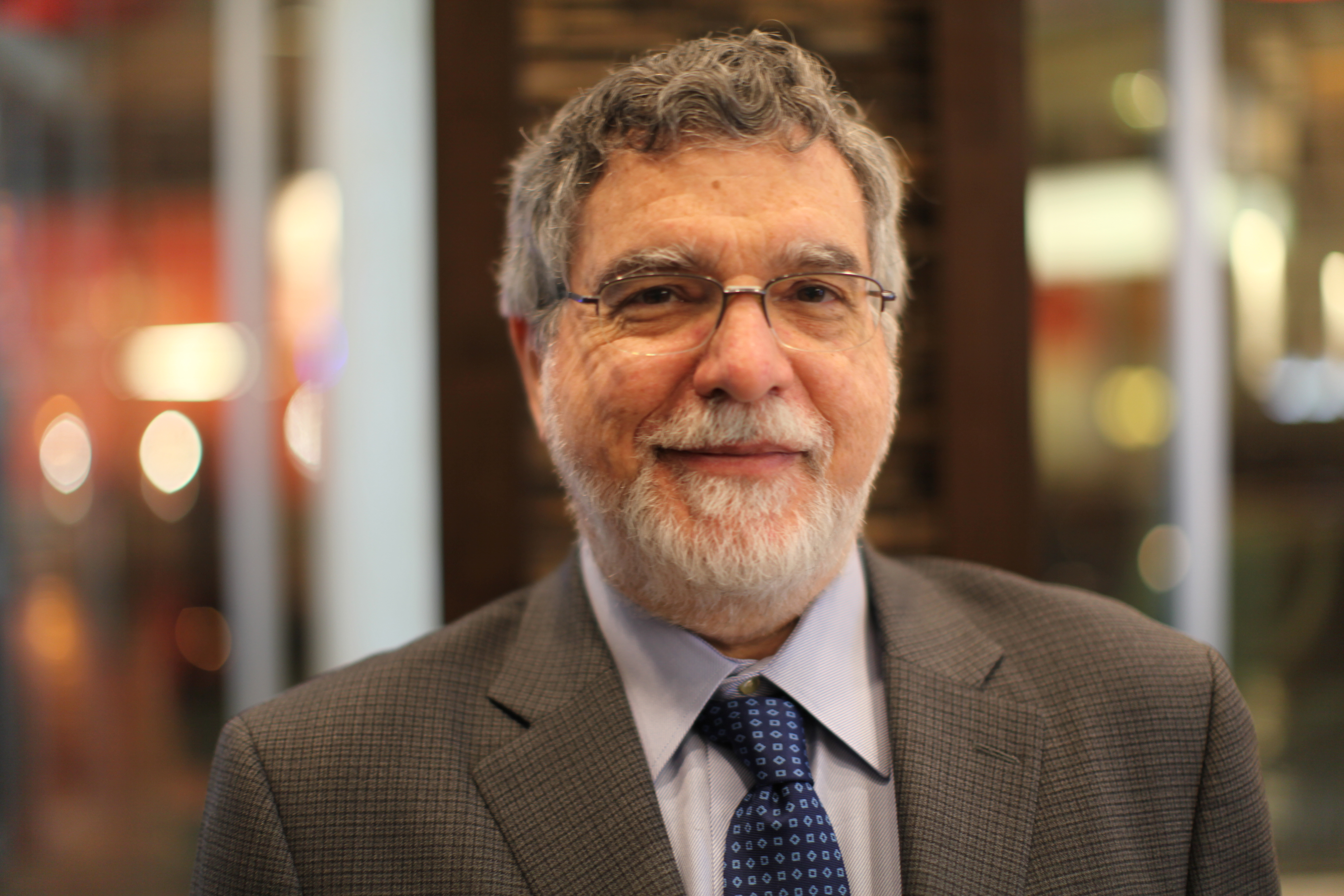
- Howard Nusbaum, PhD founder of the Center for Practical Wisdom
- Born: 1954 (age 71–72); Chicago, Illinois, United States
- Education: SUNY at Buffalo, New York; USA
- Known for: Speech research, Cognitive neuroscience
- Awards: University of Chicago Future Faculty Mentorship Award, Quantrell Awards for Excellence in Undergraduate Teaching
- Scientific career
- Fields: Social neuroscience, Cognitive Psychology, Speech
- Workplaces: University of Chicago (professor)
- Doctoral advisor: James Sawusch

Howard C. Nusbaum (/ˈnʊsbɔːm/, born 1954) is the Stella M. Rowley Professor of Psychology at the University of Chicago, United States, and a steering committee member of the Neuroscience Institute. He is also the founder and director of the Chicago Center for Practical Wisdom. He recently served as the Social Sciences Division Deputy Dean, the Deputy Dean of the College, and the Master of the Social Sciences Collegiate Division. He also was the Division Director for the Division of Behavioral and Cognitive Sciences in the Directorate of the Social, Behavioral, and Economic Sciences at the National Science Foundation. Nusbaum is an internationally recognized expert in cognitive psychology, speech science, and in the new field of social neuroscience. Nusbaum investigates the cognitive and neural mechanisms that mediate spoken language use, as well as language learning and the role of attention in speech perception. In addition, he investigates how we understand the meaning of music, and how cognitive and social-emotional processes interact in decision-making.

== Background ==
Nusbaum went to Brandeis University, Massachusetts, and obtained a B.A. in psychology and computer science in 1976. He was awarded Doctor of Philosophy (Ph.D.) from SUNY at Buffalo (New York) in 1981. He then worked as a research associate at Indiana University (Bloomington, Indiana), and joined the University of Chicago in 1986, where he is a professor. He served as Chair of the psychology department from 1997-2010. Nusbaum is the co-director of the Center for Cognitive and Social Neuroscience.

Howard Nusbaum has one daughter (Rebecca), and he is married to Anne Henly, the Director of the undergraduate research initiative in psychology at the University of Chicago social science collegiate division. They live in Hyde Park, Chicago with their two Newfoundland boys, Newton and Otto.

== Academic achievements ==
Nusbaum's scientific endeavor focuses on cognition and social neuroscience, with an emphasis on spoken language, because it is one of the primary ways by which humans interact. Nusbaum's research is concerned with understanding the psychological and neural mechanisms that mediate the use of language and that guide much of human interaction. His work on spoken language processing has emphasized the role of learning and attention and working memory using a number of techniques including functional neuroimaging, psychophysiological, and behavioral measures.

Much of Nusbaum's research is on the mechanisms of speech perception and production but recent studies have also examined the development of concepts, emotional processing, and social interaction. Notably, Nusbaum has examined the role of sleep in consolidating perceptual learning of speech sounds, the cortical mechanisms that mediate perception of audio-visual speech, the role of gesture in production and comprehension of speech, and how listeners adjust to differences among talkers.

Current research projects involve understanding the ability of non-human animals to learn language-like structure, examining the role of sleep in illusory memory and perceptuo-motor learning, the processing of emotional information in lonely people, how we use different dimensions of speech to refer to events, how our expectations change the way we understand sensory information. Nusbaum is also involved in interdisciplinary studies in the new field of neuroeconomics. He served as the principal investigator on various John Templeton grants aiming to develop scholarly investigations into the nature, cultivation, benefits and applications of wisdom.

In 2012, he received the Quantrell Award.

== Nusbaum contribution to speech research ==
Despite several decades of concerted effort, research in speech perception has yet to crack the "lack of invariance" problem: there is a many-to-many mapping between the acoustic patterns and percepts. The acoustic signature of a particular phoneme changes as a function of phonetic context, speaking rate, physical characteristics of talkers, dialect, acoustic environment, and so on. How listeners achieve "phonetic constancy" despite these sources of variability largely remains a mystery. The modal approach has been to search for invariant cues that have somehow been missed—that is, to hypothesize that there is no lack of invariance problem aside from the fact that researchers have not discovered how to detect invariant cues available to listeners.

Nusbaum has taken a distinctly contrary position, assuming that the lack of invariance is real rather than apparent, and that the basis for phonetic constancy lies in the processing mechanisms of human speech perception. Nusbaum's early work pioneered the application of cognitive psychological theories of attention and memory to problems in speech perception., Nusbaum's more recent research uses functional neuroimaging techniques to further explore these issues. For instance, he has demonstrated that increased activity in a temporal-parietal network is associated with increased task demands in a multi-talker context, and that the time-course of relative activity in auditory and motor area during perception of the McGurk effect is consistent with a model of speech perception in which visual-motor information serves as a kind of feedback to augment (and potentially supplant) auditory representations of speech sounds.

His work has also shown that two dissociable networks underlie the use of context in sentence recognition, and that sleep serves an important role in the consolidation of generalizations of phonetic knowledge learned opportunistically through exposure to an unfamiliar talker.

== Society memberships ==
Association for Psychological Science; Society for Neuroscience; Cognitive Science Society; Psychonomic Society; Associate Member of the Acoustical Society of America.

== Selected work ==
- Hoeckner, B., Wyatt, E., Decety, J., & Nusbaum, H. C. (2011). Film music influences how viewers relate to movie characters. Psychology of Aesthetics, Creativity, and the Arts, 5, 146-153.
- Fenn, K. M., Shintel, H., Atkins, A. S., Skipper, J. I., Bond, V. C., Nusbaum, H. C. (2011). When less is heard than meets the ear: change deafness in a telephone conversation. Quarterly Journal of Experimental Psychology, 64, 1442-1456.
- Margoliash, D., & Nusbaum, H. C. (2009). Language: the perspective from organismal biology. Trends in Cognitive Sciences, 13, 505-510.
- M., Gallo, D. A., Margoliash, D., Roediger III, H. L., & Nusbaum, H. C. (2009). Reduced false memory after sleep. Learning & Memory, 16, 509-513.
- Monteleone, G. T., Phan, K. L., Nusbaum, H. C., Fitzgerald, D., Hawkley, L. C., Irick, J. S., Fienberg, S. E., & Cacioppo, J. T. (2008). Detection of deception using functional Magnetic Resonance Imaging: Well above chance, though well below perfection. Social Neuroscience, 2, 1-11.
- Beilock, S.L., Lyons, I.M., Mattarella-Micke, A., Nusbaum, H.C., & Small, S.L. (2008). Sports experience changes the neural processing of action language. Proceedings of the National Academy of Sciences U S A., 105, 13269-73.
- Norris, C., Decety, J., Nusbaum, H. C., & Cacioppo, J. T. (2008). In the eye of the beholder: Individual differences in perceived social isolation predict regional brain activation to social stimuli. Journal of Cognitive Neuroscience, 21, 1-10.
- Hasson, U., Skipper, J. I., Nusbaum, H. C., & Small, S. L. (2007). Abstract coding of audiovisual speech: beyond sensory representation. Neuron, 56, 1116-1126.
- Shintel, H., & Nusbaum, H. C. (2007). The sound of motion in spoken language: Visual information conveyed by acoustic properties of speech. Cognition, 105, 681-690.

== Books ==
- Schwab, E. C., & Nusbaum, H. C. (Eds.). Pattern recognition by humans and machines: Volume 1, Speech Perception. New York: Academic Press, 1986.
- Schwab, E. C., & Nusbaum, H. C. (Eds.). Pattern recognition by humans and machines: Volume 2, Visual Perception. New York: Academic Press, 1986.
- Goodman, J. C., & Nusbaum, H. C. (Eds.). The development of speech perception: The transition from speech sounds to spoken words. MIT Press, Cambridge, 1994.
- Cacioppo, J.T., Tassinary, L. G., & Berntson, G. (Eds.). Methodology Section editor for The Handbook of Psychophysiology. Boston: Cambridge University Press, 2007.

== See also ==
- Affective neuroscience
- Cognitive psychology
- Music psychology
- Neuroeconomics
- Neuroscience
- Neuropharmacology
- Speech
- Sleep
- Social neuroscience
