= Tatjana Wood =

American comic artist (1926–2026)

- Born: Tatjana Amalie Weintraub; March 2, 1926 Darmstadt, Hesse, Germany
- Died: February 27, 2026 (aged 99) New York City, U.S.
- Area: Colourist
- Notable works: Camelot 3000; Swamp Thing
- Awards: Shazam Award, 1971, 1974; Will Eisner Award Hall of Fame, 2023
- Spouse: Wally Wood (m. 1950; div. 1966)

Tatjana Amalie Wood (née Weintraub; March 2, 1926 – February 27, 2026) was an American artist and comic book colorist.

== Life and career ==
Tatjana Weintraub was born in Darmstadt, Germany, on March 2, 1926. Her German mother, Elizabeth Hammel, who was Christian, ran a women’s clothing store. Her Russian-born father, Mische Weintraub, who was Jewish, was a photographer. During World War II, she and her brother, Karl Joachim Weintraub, were sent to an international Quaker boarding school in the Netherlands. Gaining Dutch citizenship was not easy, so after World War II, the Quakers arranged for the two to travel to New York City in 1947. Karl went on to the University of Chicago, where he became a history professor, while Tatjana stayed in New York, attending the Traphagen School of Fashion. In 1949, she met Wally Wood, and they married August 28, 1950. The couple divorced in 1966.

During the 1950s and 1960s, Wood sometimes made uncredited contributions to Wally Wood's artwork. One of the stories she worked on was "Carl Akeley" in EC Comics' Two-Fisted Tales #41 (February–March 1955). She did a number of animal drawings for that story.

Later, beginning in 1969, Wood did extensive work for DC Comics as a comic book colorist. She was the main colorist for DC's covers from 1973 through the mid-1980s. Her New York Times obituary points out that she colored nearly every DC comic cover during this time. Wood did coloring work on the interiors of comics as well, including Grant Morrison's acclaimed run on Animal Man, Alan Moore's issues of Swamp Thing, and Camelot 3000. She won the Shazam Award for Best Colorist in 1971 and 1974. Wood has had no significant credits in the comics industry since 2003. In 2023, Wood was inducted into the Will Eisner Award Hall of Fame.

She was also a dressmaker and weaver, who has crafted theatrical costumes and pictorial loom tapestries.

Wood died in New York City on February 27, 2026, at the age of 99, less than 3 days shy of her 100th birthday.
