= Robert L. Kendrick =

American musicologist

Robert L. Kendrick OMRI
- Born: Robert L. Kendrick; 1957 (age 68–69)
- Spouse: Lucia Marchi
- Awards: Order of Merit of the Italian Republic; Quantrell Award

Academic background
- Education: University of Pennsylvania (BA); New York University (MA, PhD)
- Thesis: Genres, Generations, and Gender: Nuns’ Music in Early Modern Milan, c. 1550-1706 (1993)

Academic work
- Institutions: University of Chicago
- Main interests: Renaissance and Baroque eras

Robert L. Kendrick OMRI (born 1957) is an American musicologist. He is the Robert O. Anderson Distinguished Service Professor Emeritus at the University of Chicago. He was elected to the American Academy of Arts and Sciences in 2018. In 2019 Kendrick was awarded the Order of Merit of the Italian Republic 5th class (Knight) for his work in researching sacred Italian music from the Renaissance and Baroque eras. In 2023, he received the Quantrell Award for Excellence in Undergraduate Teaching.

He also sits on the advisory board of Women's Philharmonic Advocacy, a non-profit organization that promotes equity for women composers.

== Publications ==
Selected works by Robert L. Kendrick:

- Biblical Families in Music: Conflict and Heterodoxy in Oratorios, 1670-1770, 2025
- Fruits of the Cross: Passiontide Music Theater in Habsburg Vienna, 2018
- Singing Jeremiah: Music and Meaning in Holy Week, 2014
- The Sounds of Milan, 1585-1650, 2002
- Celestial Sirens: Nuns and Their Music in Early Milan, 1996
