= Stuart Tave =

American literary scholar (1923–2026)

Stuart Malcolm Tave (April 10, 1923 – January 6, 2026) was an American literary scholar.

== Life and career ==
Tave was born in Brooklyn, New York. He graduated from Columbia University, earned a master's degree at Harvard University, and completed a D.Phil. at the University of Oxford. Tave taught at the University of Chicago, where he served as chair of the English department, dean of the Division of the Humanities, and William Rainey Harper Professor. He received a Quantrell Award for Excellence in Undergraduate Teaching from the institution in 1958, and was awarded a Guggenheim Fellowship in 1959. Upon his retirement in 1993, Tave was granted emeritus status. In 2000, the University of Chicago honored him as that year's Norman Maclean Award winner.

He served in the United States Navy from 1943 to 1946, including at the landing at Lingayen Gulf, Luzon. He served with the Strategic Bombing Survey during the occupation of Japan and penned an article about standing watch on the Japanese battleship Nagato, published October 1998.

Tave died on January 6, 2026, at the age of 102.
