= David G. Grier =

American physicist

David G. Grier is an American physicist whose research focuses on experimental soft condensed matter physics—an interdisciplinary field that includes physics, chemistry, biology, and nanotechnology, aiming to understand how objects interacting in simple ways manage to organize into sophisticated hierarchies of structure and function.

Grier is a professor in department of physics at New York University and a founding member of NYU's Center for Soft Matter Research. Named as one of the "Top 20 Scientists Under 40" by Discover magazine in 2003, Grier served as chair of the university's department of physics from 2005 until 2013.

Soft-matter research features close ties to industry, both because many of the most interesting soft-matter systems have immediate economic value and also because research in this field involves developing new methods and instruments for processing nanoscopic and microscopic systems. Among these is a holographic optical trapping technique, developed by Grier's group as part of its National Science Foundation-funded basic research program, which provides the groundwork for new categories of applications in photonics, medical diagnostics, drug discovery, and environmental monitoring. The company he founded to commercialize this technology, Arryx, Inc., was recognized with an R&D 100 Award during its first year of operation. Grier's achievements in this field have led to his being named one of the Scientific American 50 for 2004 and one of the World Economic Forum's Technology Pioneers for 2005.

His laboratory's other achievements include developing state-of-the-art methods of digital video microscopy and introducing powerful new methods of holographic video microscopy. Using these techniques, the Grier group has demonstrated the first practical tractor beams, the first knotted force fields, and the first optically organized micromachines. The partnership of optical micromanipulation and optical characterization has revealed new principles in non-equilibrium statistical physics and is responsible for the still-controversial discovery that like-charged objects sometimes can attract each other.

Grier has published over 100 peer-reviewed articles on basic research in this area and holds more than 50 U.S. Patents on technology invented in the course of this research. His efforts have been recognized with a David and Lucile Packard Foundation Fellowship. More than a dozen of his former graduate students and postdoctoral fellows have gone on to faculty positions in major universities or leadership roles in industrial research and development.

Raised in New York City and a graduate of Stuyvesant High School, Grier attended Harvard College, where he graduated with high honors in physics. He received his doctorate in physics from the University of Michigan in 1989. After two years as a postdoctoral fellow in the Condensed Matter Physics Department at AT&T Bell Laboratories, he accepted a faculty position at the University of Chicago, where he was a member of the physics department for 12 years.

In 2000, he received the Quantrell Award and in 2016, he co-founded Spheryx Inc.
