= Foreigners in the Homeland =

2000 book by Mario Santana

Foreigners in the Homeland: The Spanish American New Novel in Spain, 1962-1974
- Author: Mario Santana
- Subject: Latin American Boom
- Genre: Non-fiction
- Publication date: 2000

Foreigners in the Homeland: The Spanish American New Novel in Spain, 1962-1974 is a 2000 book by Mario Santana. The book is about the reception of the Latin American Boom. The book was reviewed in several academic journals including the Latin American Literary Review Press, Hispania, Modern Language Review, and Iberoamericana.
