= Karl Weintraub =

American historian (1924–2004)

Karl Joachim "Jock" Weintraub (December 31, 1924, Darmstadt, Germany – March 25, 2004, Chicago, Ill.) was a longtime professor of history at the University of Chicago, having taught there since 1954. He was a strong proponent of liberal education and wrote and spoke extensively on its value.

Weintraub was born in Germany to parents of German and Russian-Jewish ancestry; in reaction to the increasing Nazi discrimination against Jews, they fled to the Netherlands in 1935, where they were forced into hiding during the Nazi occupation. During this time, Weintraub attended the Quaker Eerde School. He and his sister Tatjana Wood emigrated to the United States in 1948. He received his post-secondary education at the University of Chicago, attaining a B.A. in 1949, a Master's in 1952, and a Ph.D. in history in 1957.

Weintraub's scholarship focused on culture, autobiography, and the history of the self; he was the author of Visions Of Culture (1966) and The Value Of The Individual: Self and Circumstance in Autobiography (1978). Weintraub noted that 18th- and 19th-century autobiographical writers often used a narrative of "development" in their stories, as distinct from earlier autobiographies' use of a narrative of "unfolding". He was a renowned teacher of the University of the Chicago's core-curriculum course Western Civilizations, which was taught by his wife Katy O'Brien Weintraub until 2024. Weintraub's classes, with a head count typically capped in the twenties, would attract hundreds of potential students and were some of the most popular classes at the college for many years.

He received the Quantrell Award in 1960 and 1987. Since the start of this annual teaching award at the University of Chicago in 1938, he is one of only five people (the others being Norman Nachtrieb, Bertram Cohler, Lorna Straus, and James M. Redfield) to receive the award twice.
