= John Comaroff =

South African anthropologist (born 1945)

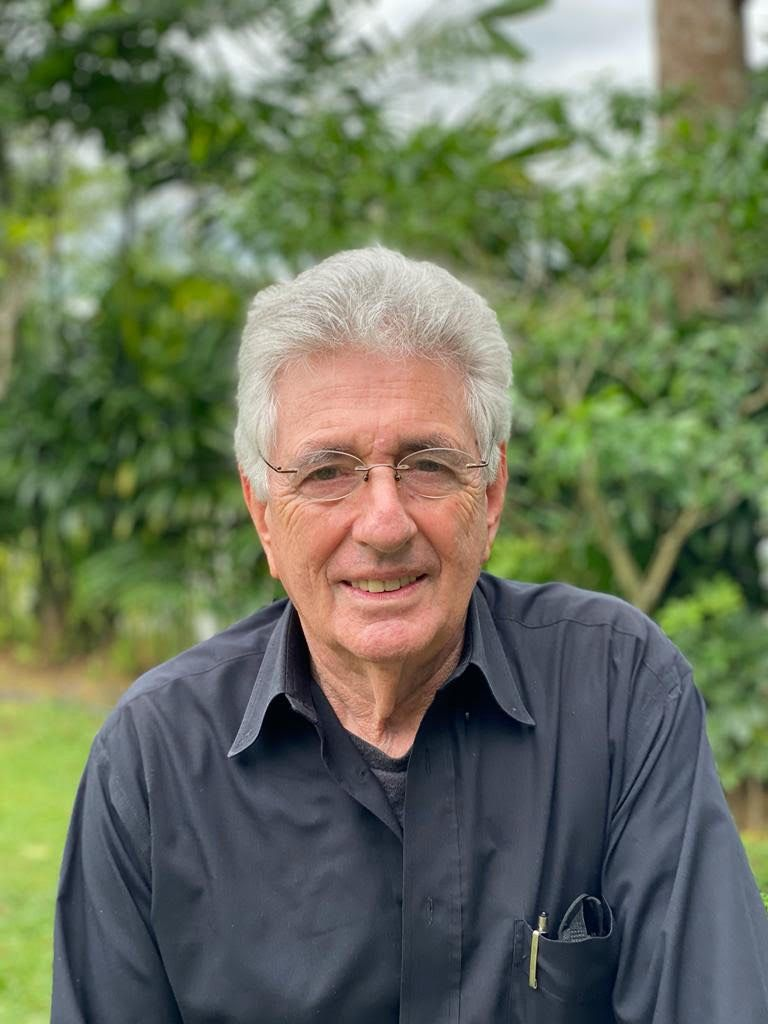
- Born: 1 January 1945 (age 81); Cape Town, South Africa
- Education: University of Cape Town; London School of Economics
- Scientific career
- Fields: Anthropology
- Workplaces: Harvard University
- Doctoral advisor: Isaac Schapera

John L. Comaroff (born 1 January 1945) is a retired professor of African and African American Studies and of anthropology. He is recognized for his study of African and African-American society. Comaroff and his wife, anthropologist Jean Comaroff, have collaborated on publications examining post-colonialism and the Tswana people in South Africa. He has written several texts describing his research and has presented peer-reviewed anthropological theories of African cultures that have relevance to understanding global society.

In 2020, Comaroff was placed on paid administrative leave from his position at Harvard University after allegations of sexual harassment. In January 2022 he was placed on unpaid leave before resuming teaching in September. In 2023, a student lawsuit against Harvard for inadequately responding to the allegations moved to mediation before being settled in 2024. The same year, the Harvard Faculty of Arts and Sciences extended a one-time retirement option to all tenured professors aged 73 and above. Comaroff notified Harvard of his retirement on March 8. His retirement became effective on June 30, 2024.

== Early life and education ==
Comaroff was born in Cape Town, South Africa, the only child of Jane Miller Comaroff and Louis (sometimes known as Lionel) Comaroff. His father's family was from Russian Empire, Ukraine: his grandfather migrated in the early 1890s from Ukraine to England, and his father, Louis, was born in Rhodesia. Comaroff's mother's family migrated to South Africa from Russian Empire, Lithuania in the early 1900s.

Comaroff was the first person in his family to attend university. He attended the University of Cape Town, where he developed his interest in anthropology. In his second year at the university, he met his classmate and future wife, Jean. They completed their bachelor's degrees and part of their Honors year at the University of Cape Town. The second part of their Honors year was completed at the London School of Economics.

== Career ==
Comaroff has conducted most of his field research in South Africa. From 1969 to 1970 he spent 19 months studying society, culture, politics, and law among the Barolong boo Ratshidi, part of the Tswana chiefdoms along the South Africa-Botswana Borderland. From 1972 to 1973, he went back to the Mafeking District, of the Barolong boo Ratshidi, for supplementary research on society and culture for filming Heal the Whole Man, which looks at healing and other religious practices of the Barolong boo Ratshidi. He then focused his research on the social and cultural aspects of economic development of the Barolong in Botswana for 15 months in 1974 and 1975. From 1977 to 1978 for three months, he focused on this group again but looked at the rise of agrarian capitalism. During the summers of 1990–1998, Comaroff returned to South Africa to conduct research in various places such as Bophuthatswana, better known as the North West Province. From 1999 to 2001, he again studied in the North West Province, looking at occult-related violence. He researched this topic for 15 months. Then from 2002 to 2001, he studied crime and policing in this area. In 2005–2010 he did comparative research on the ways in which ethnic identity and cultural property have become commodified, focusing on the Tswana and San peoples as case studies.

Comaroff joined the American Bar Foundation in 1991 as a research fellow until 2012. He is no longer an affiliated scholar at the American Bar Foundation.

Since 2009, Comaroff has worked on the project Ethnicity Inc., follow-up research being conducted in connection with the Comaroffs' book Ethnicity Inc. The project focuses on why ethnic groups have become increasingly like corporations, why culture has become more like intellectual property, and what about the contemporary world has made it that way.

In 2012 the Comaroffs published a book, Theory from the South, about how research conducted in Africa helps us understand emerging patterns in global economy and society.

John and Jean Comaroff spent 34 years teaching at the University of Chicago. In 2012, they took teaching positions at Harvard University.

== Research interests ==
Much of Comaroff's early work was focused on African politics and law. His first book, Rules and Processes: The Cultural Logic of Dispute in an African Context, co-authored with Simon Roberts, explores the nature of Tswana legal processes.

Witchcraft has been a topic of longstanding interest for the Comaroffs. They became particularly interested in it after returning to South Africa in the 1990s, shortly before and after apartheid had ended there, when the northern provinces experienced a rise in witch-related killings.

Global capitalism is also a topic of interest for both Comaroffs. Their Ethnicity Inc. (2009) focuses on global capitalism and its impact on social identity. So does their work on lawfare, which investigates how the law has been used to perpetrate, and to counter the perpetration of, violence. The concept is developed in their 2006 book Law and Disorder in the Postcolony.

In their book Of Revelation and Revolution, the Comaroffs look closely at hegemony. They write, "We take hegemony to refer to that order of signs and practices, relations and distinctions, images and epistemologies—drawn from a historically situated cultural field—that come to be taken for granted for as the natural and received shape of the world".

In addition to holding professorships at Chicago and Harvard, Comaroff has been a lecturer in social anthropology at the University College of Swansea, University of Wales (1971–1972) and the University of Manchester (1972–1978). He has also been a visiting professor at the University of California Riverside (1981–1982), Duke University (1989), Tel Aviv University (2000), University of Basel (2005), and the University of Vienna (2007). Comaroff was an Honorary Senior Fellow at the University of Manchester in the International Centre for Contemporary Cultural Research (1994–1995) and in the Department of Social Anthropology (1996–1998). In 1988 and 1995 he was an Associate Director of Studies at the Ecole des Haute Etudes en Sciences Sociales in Paris. He was a visiting scholar at the Center for Modern Oriental Studies in Berlin (1998), a visiting fellow at the Stellenbosch Institute for Advance Study in South Africa (2010 and 2011), and an Honorary Professor at the University of Cape Town between 2004 and 2020.

== Awards and honors ==
- Jensen Memorial Lectures, Frobenius Institute, Johann Wolfgang Goethe-Universität Frankfurt am Main (2001)
- Monica Wilson Memorial Lecture, University of Cape Town (2004)
- Carl Schlettwein Lecture, Zentrum für Afrikastudien Basel, University of Basel (2005)
- Llewellyn John and Harriet Manchester Quantrell Award for Excellence in Undergraduate Teaching, University of Chicago (2002)
- Anders Retzius Gold Medal, Swedish Society for Anthropology and Geography, presented by the King of Sweden (2007, with Jean Comaroff)
- Harry J. Kalven, Jr. Prize, Law and Society Association, for career-long contributions to the study of law (2008, with Jean Comaroff)

== Sexual harassment allegations ==
In May 2020, The Harvard Crimson reported that multiple students had filed Title IX complaints alleging harassment and professional retaliation by Comaroff; he was subsequently placed on paid administrative leave for a semester.

In January 2022, Harvard completed two internal reviews and placed Comaroff on unpaid leave for one semester, finding a violation of the Faculty of Arts and Sciences' sexual and professional conduct policies arising out of what was adjudged to be inappropriate verbal communication. He was barred temporarily from teaching required courses and taking on new advisees, although he continued to teach his graduate advisees.

In February 2022, three graduate students sued Harvard, alleging that it failed to respond adequately to longstanding harassment and retaliation claims; Comaroff and Harvard each denied the allegations. In late 2023 the case entered mediation and in 2024 it was dismissed with prejudice and without costs.

On September 6, 2022, after Comaroff returned from administrative leave, students walked out of his classroom before the first lecture of the semester was to begin. The Harvard Graduate Students Union then staged a protest outside the building, criticizing Harvard's decision not to fire Comaroff. It also circulated a petition demanding that Harvard be more transparent about how it conducts sexual harassment investigations and decides upon sanctions. Comaroff faced a similar walkout and protest at his first class of January 2023.

In October 2023 Dean Hopi Hoekstra confirmed that a few sanctions were still in place and under consideration, including restrictions on some of Comaroff's teaching assignments, but these came to an end with his retirement.

== Bibliography ==
- Comaroff, John L.; Roberts, Simon (1986). Rules and Processes: The Cultural Logic of Dispute in an African Context. Chicago, Illinois: University of Chicago Press.
- Comaroff, Jean; Comaroff, John L. (1991). Of Revelation and Revolution, Volume 1: Christianity, Colonialism, and Consciousness in South Africa. Chicago, Illinois: University of Chicago Press. ISBN 9780226114422.
- Comaroff, Jean; Comaroff, John L. (2006). Law and Disorder in the Postcolony. Chicago, Illinois: University of Chicago Press. ISBN 9780226114088. LCCN 2006006541.
- Comaroff, John L.; Comaroff, Jean; James, Deborah (2007). Picturing a Colonial Past: The African Photographs of Isaac Schapera. Chicago, Illinois: University of Chicago Press. ISBN 978-0226114125.
- Comaroff, Jean; Comaroff, John L. (2009). Ethnicity, Inc. Chicago, Illinois: University of Chicago Press. ISBN 978-0-226-11472-9.
- Comaroff, Jean; Comaroff, John L. (2011). Theory from the South: Or, How Euro-America is Evolving Toward Africa. Boulder, Colorado: Paradigm.
