= John W. Boyer =

American historian

- Occupation: Historian

Academic background
- Education: Loyola University Chicago (BA) University of Chicago (MA, PhD)

John W. Boyer (born October 17, 1946, in Chicago) is an American historian. He is Senior Advisor to the President and the Martin A. Ryerson Distinguished Service Professor at the University of Chicago. He served as Dean of the College from 1992 until 2023, making him the longest-tenured dean in the College's history.

== Teaching and research ==
Boyer was born in Chicago, Illinois. He obtained his Bachelor of Arts degree in 1968 from Loyola University Chicago. He went on to earn a Master of Arts in 1969 and Ph.D. in 1975 from the University of Chicago. His field specialties include: Nineteenth- and twentieth-century European political and cultural history, Germany from 1740 to 1918, the Habsburg monarchy between 1648 and 1918, religion and politics in modern European history, and history of the universities.

He has been a co-editor of The Journal of Modern History since 1980, alongside Jan E. Goldstein. Boyer has received accolades from the Austrian government for his scholarly dedication: in 2004, he was awarded the Cross of Honor for Science and Art, First Class, in recognition of his work on the history of the Habsburg Empire; in 2006, he received the Austrian State Prize for Modern History.

== Administrative career ==
In addition to his teaching and research, Boyer has held a number of administrative positions at the University of Chicago. He has been the Chairman of the Council on Advanced Studies in the Humanities and Social Sciences since 1986 and the Dean of the college since 1992, the longest tenure of anyone in that position. In 1992–93, he also served as Acting Dean of the Social Sciences Division. Prior to that, he was the Master of the Social Sciences Collegiate Division and Deputy Dean of the Social Sciences Division from 1987 to 1992. Some of his notable accomplishments include strengthening alumni relations, increasing funding for faculty chairs and student scholarship funds, and increasing the diversity of each successive class. He has also worked to get well-known scholars to teach undergraduate courses. In 1993, that rate was 41% of tenured associate or full professors. He noted that professors who teach in the Core received an additional $1,500 in 2006, adding that "it's really pretty small."

Boyer has focused on the development of study abroad programs. He was deeply involved with the establishment of the University of Chicago Center in Paris, as well as many other programs and internships. As a result, study abroad rates have tripled since 1992.

On March 15, 2017, Boyer was reappointed to an unprecedented 6th term as the Dean of the college at the University of Chicago.

In June 2023, Boyer left his role as dean of the undergraduate college to begin a new role as Senior Advisor to the President.

== Selected publications ==
- Boyer, John W. (2022). Austria, 1867-1955. (Oxford History of Modern Europe) Oxford University Press, ISBN 978-0-19-8221296
- Boyer, John W. (2006). Broad and Christian in the Fullest Sense": William Rainey Harper and the University of Chicago. Volume 15 of Occasional papers on higher education. University of Chicago Press.
- Boyer, John W. (2005). The "Persistence to Keep Everlastingly At It": Fund-Raising and Philanthropy at Chicago in the Twentieth Century. Volume 13 of Occasional papers on higher education. University of Chicago Press.
- Boyer, John W. (2004). Judson's War and Hutchins's Peace: The University of Chicago and War in the Twentieth Century. Volume 12 of Occasional papers on higher education. University of Chicago Press.
- Boyer, John W. (2003). Academic Freedom and The Modern University. The Experience of the University of Chicago. Volume 10 of Occasional papers on higher education. University of Chicago Press.
- Boyer, John W. (2002). The Organization of the College and the Divisions in the 1920s and 1930s. Volume 8 of Occasional papers on higher education. University of Chicago Press.
- Boyer, John W. (2001). Building for a Long Future. The Role of the Trustees in the Early University. Volume 6 of Occasional papers on higher education. University of Chicago Press.
- Boyer, John W. (1995). Culture and political crisis in Vienna: Christian socialism in power, 1897-1918. University of Chicago Press, ISBN 978-0-226-06960-9
- Boyer, John W. (1995). Political radicalism in late imperial Vienna: Origins of the Christian Social movement, 1848-1897. University of Chicago Press, ISBN 978-0-226-06956-2
- Geyer, Michael; Boyer, John W. (1995). Resistance against the Third Reich, 1933-1990. University of Chicago Press, ISBN 978-0-226-06959-3
- Boyer, John W.; Goldstein, Jan (1988). Nineteenth-century Europe: liberalism and its critics. University of Chicago Press, ISBN 978-0-226-06951-7
- Boyer, John W.; Kirshner, Julius (1987). The Old regime and the French Revolution. University of Chicago Press, ISBN 978-0-226-06949-4
