= Harold Richman =

American child welfare researcher

Harold A. Richman
- Born: 1937; United States
- Died: July 30, 2009 (aged 71–72); Chicago, Illinois, United States
- Education: The University of Chicago, Chicago, IL; USA
- Known for: his research to inform policies and practices of child welfare.
- Scientific career
- Fields: Public Policy
- Workplaces: The University of Chicago (professor)

Harold Richman (15 May 1937 – 30 July 2009) was the founding director of Chapin Hall Center for Children, a policy research center at the University of Chicago known for pioneering methods of collecting, linking, and analyzing administrative data from public agencies to help monitor outcomes of children and youth and their families involved in U. S. public programs. He was Hermon Dunlap Smith Professor Emeritus of Social Welfare Policy at the University of Chicago School of Social Service Administration and the College.

== Education ==
At age 22, Harold Richman received an A.B in American History and Literature from Harvard College, Cambridge, Massachusetts. He continued his studies at the University of Chicago, Chicago, Illinois, where he received his M.A. in Social Welfare Policy in 1961 and his PhD in 1969.

== Employment ==
After two years as Associate Professor, Harold Richman became Dean and Professor of the School of Social Service Administration. He served as Dean of the SSA from 1969 to 1978.

In 1985, Harold Richman guided the board of Chapin Hall, a residential home created during the American Civil War to care for “half orphans," in redefining its mission. he established Chapin Hall as a university-based research center that conducted research with the express purpose of informing child welfare policy and practice. He helped to shape a field of research around the array of activities and resources needed by all young people to thrive physically, socially, and academically and led work at Chapin Hall to document and evaluate community-building initiatives and the role philanthropy plays in those efforts.

He stepped down as director of Chapin Hall in 2000, but continued as a research fellow and advised research centers in several countries including South Africa, Ireland, Jordan, and Israel.

== Leading and Reforming, for the sake of vulnerable children ==
Harold Richman provided public policy leadership throughout the world:

- He sat on boards of major public institutions (service agencies, public policy institutes) and foundations, several of which he helped create. This included the John Gardner Center at Stanford University; the Children’s Institute at the University of Cape Town; the Information and Research Center in Amman, Jordan; The Engelberg Center for Children and Youth at the Myers-JDC-Brookdale Institute in Jerusalem, and the Center for the Study of Social Policy in Washington D.C.
- He sat on the boards of a number of foundations (SEED Foundation in Washington D.C., Michael Reese Health Trust, Chicago, IL, MB Fund, Chicago, IL) and civic groups (Bulletin of the Atomic Scientists, Interfaith Youth Core, Mental Disability Rights International, Afterschool Matters, Chicago, IL).
- He led a Committee on Public Policy Studies at the University of Chicago. The Committee has since evolved into the internationally respected Irving B. Harris School of Public Policy Studies, a graduate professional school at the University of Chicago.
- He established Chapin Hall as a policy research center at the University of Chicago to inform child-family policy.
- Under his leadership, the School of Social of Administration became a leading institution in the field of social welfare policy and administration.
- He was the first chairman and served on the board of The University of Chicago's Laboratory Schools (the preK–12 school founded by John Dewey), the council of the College, and the Social Service Review.
- He was a member of the Governing Board of the Bulletin of the Atomic Scientists.

He advised colleagues, government officials, and philanthropists on countless policy issues, as well as small neighborhood groups helping highly vulnerable communities.

== Honors ==
- The White House Fellows Legacy of Leadership Award, 2009
- Quantrell Award for Excellence in Undergraduate Teaching, University of Chicago, 1990
- Hermon Dunlap Smith Professor of Social Welfare Policy in the School of Social Service Administration and the College, University of Chicago 1969 – present (Emeritus, 2002–present)
- White House fellow and Special Assistant to the Secretary of Labor, W. Willard Wirtz, 1965–66
- Elizabeth Dixon Award for Special Distinction, University of Chicago, 1960
- Harvard College National Scholar, 1955–59; John Harvard Scholar, 1955–59

A Harold A. Richman Fellowship has been created in Mr. Richman's honor, to support outstanding child policy researchers at Chapin Hall early in their careers.

== Death ==
Harold Richman died in Chicago on 30 July 2009 after a long battle with cancer.

== Selected publications ==
- Sojourner, A., Brown, P., Chaskin, R., Hamilton, R., Fiester, L., Richman, H.: Moving Forward While Staying in Place: Embedded Funders and Community Change. Chicago: Chapin Hall Center for Children, (June 2004).
- Brown, P., Chaskin, R., Hamilton, R., Richman, H.: Toward Greater Effectiveness in Community Change: Challenges and Responses for Philanthropy; in: Practice Matters: The Improving Philanthropy Project. The Foundation Center, New York, NY, October 2003.
- Richman, Harold A. Child Abuse and Neglect: From Radiology to Public Policy. What Have We Wrought?, Journal of the North American Society of Pediatric Radiology (1999).
- Brown, P. and H. Richman. "Neighborhood Effects and State and Local Policy." In G. Duncan, J. Brooks-Gunn and L. Aber (Eds.) Neighborhood Poverty, Volume II: Policy Implications in Studying Neighborhoods, New York, NY, Russell Sage, (1998).
- Brown, Prudence and Harold A. Richman. Communities and Neighborhoods: How Can Existing Research Inform and Shape Current Urban Change Initiatives?, Social Science Research Council, New York, 1995.
- Richman, Harold A. and Robert J. Chaskin. "Concerns About School-linked Services: Institution-based versus Community-based Models." In The Future of Children, vol. 2, Los Altos, CA: Center for the Future of Children and the David and Lucille Packard Foundation, 1992. Reprinted in Education and Urban Society, vol. 25, no. 2, 201-211, February 1993.
- Richman, Harold; Joan Wynn and Joan Costello. Children's Services in Metropolitan Chicago: Directions for the Future, Chicago: Chicago Community Trust, 1990.
- Richman, Harold. "Child Abuse, Foster Care & Preventive Services." In Raising Children for the Twenty-First Century. Washington, D.C.: American Enterprise Institute, 1990.
- Wynn, Joan; Harold A. Richman, Robert Rubinstein, and Julia Littell. Communities and Adolescents: An Exploration of Reciprocal Supports. New York: William T. Grant Foundation, 1989.
- Stagner, Matthew and Harold A. Richman. Help Seeking and the Use of Social Service Providers by Welfare Families in Chicago, Hardship and Support Systems in Chicago, vol. 3, Chicago: Chicago Community Trust, 1986.
- Richman, Harold A. and Matthew Stagner. "Children in an Aging Society." Daedelus (Winter, 1986). Reprinted in Our Aging Society: Promise and Paradox. Richmond, VA, W. W. Norton Press, 1986.
- Richman, Harold A. (with L. Bowen, M. Stagner, and D. Engstrom). "Children's Habitat." In State of the Child, 1985, by Mark Testa and Edward Lawlor. Chicago: Chapin Hall Center, 1986.
- Stagner, M. and Harold A. Richman. "Reexamining the Role of General Assistance." Public Welfare (Spring, 1986).
- Stagner, M. and Harold A. Richman. General Assistance Profiles: Findings from a Longitudinal Study of New General Assistance Recipients. Springfield, IL: Illinois Department of Public Aid, 1985.
- Richman, Harold A.; Frank Farrow, and Judith Meltzer, eds. Policy Options in Long Term Care. Chicago: University of Chicago Press, 1981.
- Richman, Harold A. "Accountability: A View of Federal Policy." In Social Work in the New Age of Accountability. Seattle: University of Washington Press, 1973.
- O'Toole, James, Harold A. Richman, et al. Work in America., Cambridge, MA: MIT Press, 1972.
- Richman, Harold A. "Casework With a Child Following Heart Surgery." Children, vol 2, no. 5. Reprinted in Communicating with Children, Eileen Holgate ed. London: Longman, 1972.

== See also ==
- Child Welfare
- Public Policy
