= John Boyer (software engineer) =

American software engineer (1936–2023)

- Born: John Joseph Boyer; July 25, 1936; Wadena, Minnesota, U.S.
- Died: January 17, 2023 (aged 86); Madison, Wisconsin, U.S.
- Education: College of St. Thomas; University of Wisconsin–Madison
- Occupation: Software engineer
- Organization: Computers to Help People Inc.
- Known for: Braille software
- Notable work: liblouis, BrailleBlaster
- Spouse: Hazel Mendenhall (m. 1973; died 1977)

John Joseph Boyer (July 25, 1936 – January 17, 2023) was an American software engineer who developed open-source software for the blind.

== Early life and education ==
Boyer was born in Wadena, Minnesota, the fifth of 12 children of John H. Boyer and Tillie M. (Ament) Boyer. His father owned a farm-equipment business. Boyer was born blind, and lost his hearing before age 10 after a series of ear infections.

He attended the New York Institute for the Blind and graduated from high school as the salutatorian in 1956.

Boyer enrolled at the College of St. Thomas in Saint Paul, studying math and psychology. The college president, Monsignor James Shannon, was initially skeptical of how a blind and deaf student could "hear lectures, recite in class or write examinations," but later said, "[Boyer] has demonstrated that he can perform each of these functions with brilliant success." The National Foundation of the Blind gave Boyer a translator who took notes and signed lectures into Boyer's hand. His textbooks were translated into braille, but didn't contain any graphs. In 1961, he graduated magna cum laude with a B.S. in math.

Unable to find a job after graduating, Boyer worked an assembly line, while also training his own guide dog and building a hearing aid. He was forced to train his own guide dog because the program could only accommodate blind people and not those who were also deaf.

At the University of Cincinnati, he took a course for blind computer programmers in 1964, and worked as a programmer in Ohio and later at the University of Wisconsin–Parkside. In 1982 he received a master's degree in computer science from University of Wisconsin–Madison; he also worked on a doctorate but never finished his dissertation.

== Career ==
While studying at UW-Madison, Boyer founded Computers to Help People Inc., a non-profit to help people with disabilities find computer-related jobs as well as publish scientific books in braille.

He developed Liblouis, which translates text into braille, and released it as free and open source software under the LGPL license. Named after Louis Braille, the project was commissioned in 2002 by ViewPlus Technologies Inc., a braille printing company. Boyer extended liblouis's functionality so it could convert HTML and XML files into braille and later added support for tactile graphics. Software Freedom Conservancy, which now serves as the non-profit home for liblouis, described it as "an essential tool for blind and visually impaired users."

In 2010, with ViewPlus Technologies, Boyer developed BrailleBlaster, a Java application that allows users to create and edit braille text. It is now developed by the American Printing House for the Blind.

President Barack Obama named Boyer a Champion of Change in 2012 for "leading education and employment efforts in science, technology, engineering and math for Americans with disabilities". He was honored at a White House ceremony, but found it frustrating because the staff had arranged for an ASL interpreter, which he couldn't see.

== Personal life ==
Boyer was a fan of science fiction and at one time owned a 7-foot-long (2.1 m) boa constrictor.

While working at UW-Parkside, Boyer met his wife, Hazel Mendenhall. The two married in 1973, however Mendenhall died from ALS in 1977. Losing his wife led Boyer into depression; he said his Roman Catholic faith and counseling helped him out of it.

Boyer died on January 17, 2023, while being treated for pneumonia at UW Health University Hospital. He was survived by two brothers and five sisters.
