= Lutheran, Germany =

Lutheran
- Ortsteil of Lübz
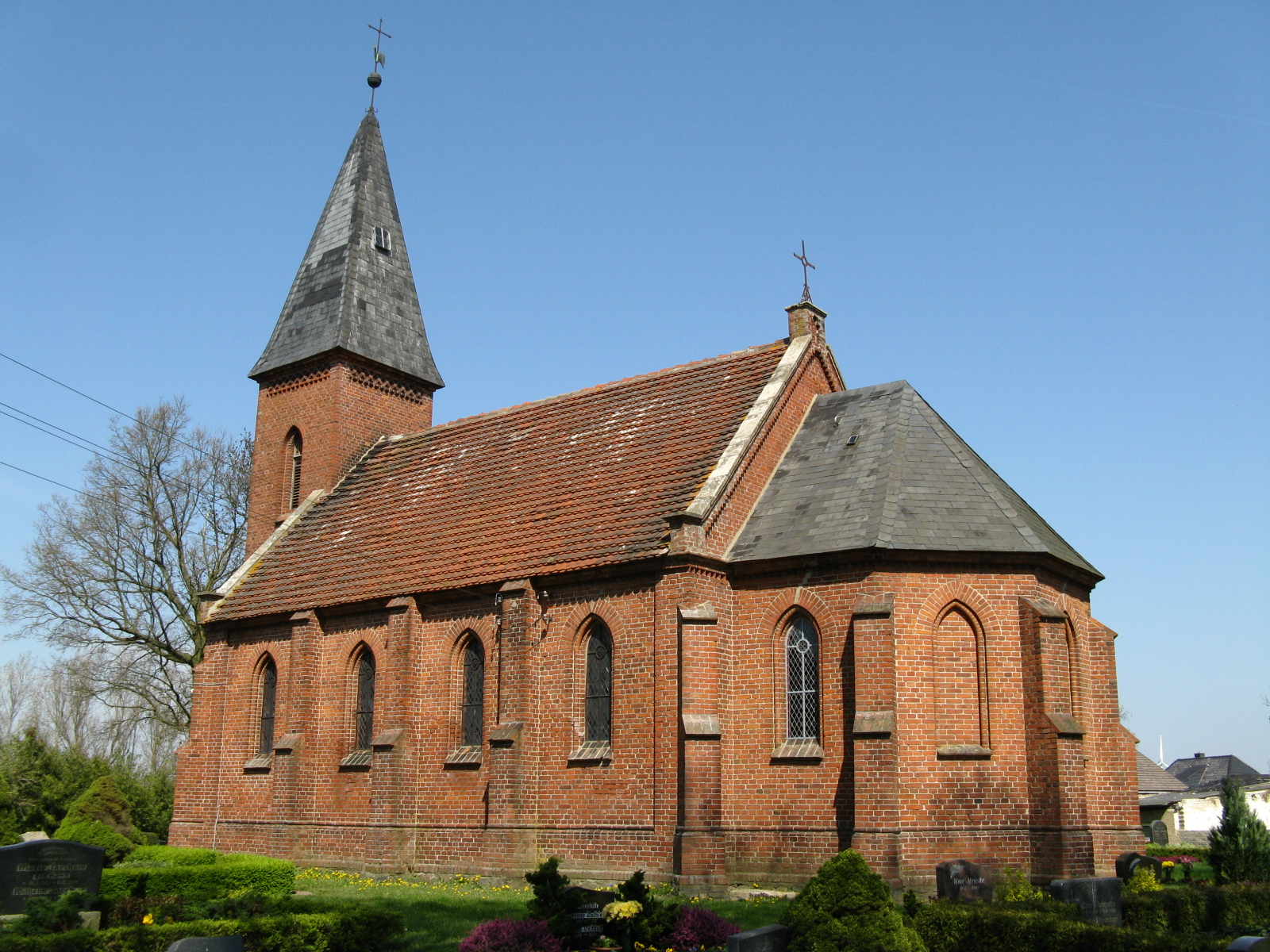
- Church
- Interactive map of Lutheran
- Location within Germany Location within Mecklenburg-Vorpommern
- Coordinates: 53°27′N 12°00′E
- Country: Germany
- State: Mecklenburg-Vorpommern
- District: Ludwigslust-Parchim
- Town: Lübz

Area
  - Total: 8.46 km^{2} (3.27 sq mi)
- Elevation: 56 m (184 ft)

Population (2012-12-31)
  - Total: 299
  - Density: 35.3/km^{2} (91.5/sq mi)
- Time zone: UTC+01:00 (CET)
  - Summer (DST): UTC+02:00 (CEST)
- Postal codes: 19386
- Dialling codes: 038731
- Vehicle registration: PCH

Lutheran (German pronunciation: [lʊtəˈʁaːn]) is a village and a former municipality in the Ludwigslust-Parchim district, in Mecklenburg-Vorpommern, Germany. Since 25 May 2014, it is part of the town Lübz.
