= The Journal of Modern History =

- Discipline: History
- Language: English
- Edited by: John W. Boyer, Jan E. Goldstein, Fredrik Albritton Jonsson

Publication details
- History: 1929–present
- Publisher: University of Chicago Press in cooperation with the Modern European History Section of the American Historical Association (United States)
- Frequency: Quarterly
- Impact factor: 0.806 (2020)

Standard abbreviations
- ISO 4: J. Mod. Hist.

Indexing
- ISSN: 0022-2801
- LCCN: 31005078
- JSTOR: 00222801
- OCLC no.: 263589299

Links
- Journal homepage

The Journal of Modern History is a quarterly peer-reviewed academic journal covering European intellectual, political, and cultural history, published by the University of Chicago Press. Established in 1929, the journal covers events from approximately 1500 to the present, with a geographical scope extending from the United Kingdom through the European continent, including Russia and the Balkans. The journal also publishes articles on topics connected with European empires and overseas expansion.

== Editors and editorial board ==
The Journal of Modern History is coedited by John W. Boyer, Jan E. Goldstein, and Fredrik Albritton Jonsson. Previous editors include Sheila Fitzpatrick, Hanna Gray, William Hardy McNeill, and Bernadotte Schmitt.

== Format and contents ==
The journal publishes articles and book reviews. On occasion, it has published special issues focusing on specific topics.

== The Chester Penn Higby Prize ==
Chester Penn Higby (1886–1966) served on the history faculty at the University of Wisconsin–Madison from 1927 to 1956, and was one of the founders of the Journal of Modern History. He also served as the first president of the Modern European History Section of the American Historical Association. Upon his retirement, several of his former students established a trust fund to provide a cash prize for the best article published in the journal. The prize is awarded during even-numbered years, and past winners have included Jan E. Goldstein, William W. Hagen, Susan Pedersen, and Heinrich August Winkler.
