= Economic antisemitism =

Prejudice against Jews based on their economic status and activities

Economic antisemitism is antisemitism that uses stereotypes and canards that are based on negative perceptions or assertions of the economic status, occupations, or economic behavior of Jews, at times leading to various governmental policies, regulations, taxes, and laws that target or disproportionately impact the economic status, occupations, or behavior of Jews.

== Relationship to religious antisemitism ==
Leon Poliakov writes that economic antisemitism is not a distinct form of antisemitism but merely a manifestation of theological antisemitism (without the theological causes of economic antisemitism, there would be no economic antisemitism). On the other hand, Derek Penslar contends that in the modern era, economic antisemitism is "distinct and nearly constant" but theological antisemitism is "often subdued".

== Stereotypes and canards ==
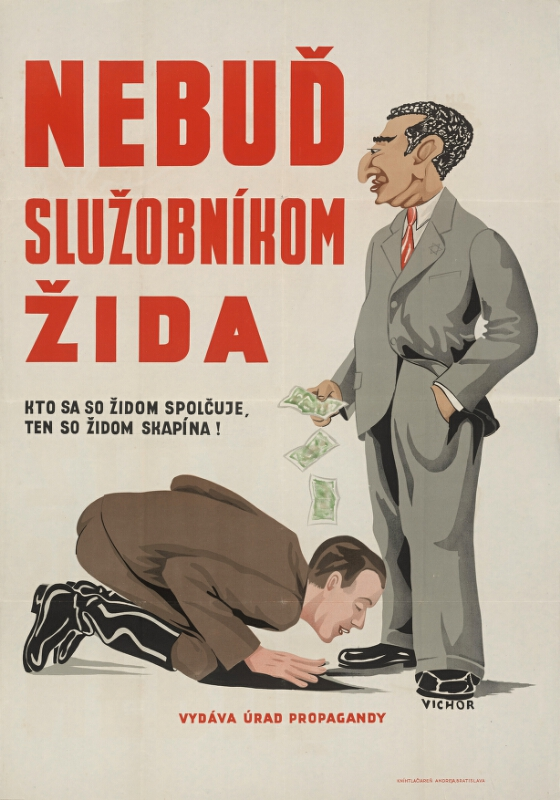
A World War II-era Slovak propaganda poster exhorts readers not to "be a servant to the Jew".

Derek Penslar describes modern economic antisemitism as a "double helix of intersecting paradigms, the first associating the Jew with paupers and savages and the second conceiving of Jews as conspirators, leaders of a financial cabal seeking global domination".

Throughout history, stereotypes of Jews as being connected to greed, money-lending, and usury have stoked anti-Jewish sentiments and still, to a large extent, influence the perception of Jews today. Reuveni and Wobick-segev suggest that we are still haunted by the image of "the mighty, greedy Jew".

Allegations on the relationship of Jews and money have been characterised as underpinning the most damaging and lasting antisemitic canards.

Antisemites have often promulgated myths related to money, such as the canard that Jews control the world finances, first promoted in the Protocols of the Elders of Zion, and later repeated by Henry Ford and his Dearborn Independent. Many such myths are still widespread in the Islamic world such as in books like The Secret Relationship Between Blacks and Jews, published by the Nation of Islam, as well as on the internet.

Abraham Foxman cites examples of economic antisemitism found around the world, particularly in the United Kingdom, Germany, Argentina, and Spain. He also cites many modern instances of money-related antisemitism that are found on the Internet.

Gerald Krefetz summarizes the myths as Jews "control the banks, the money supply, the economy, and businesses – of the community, of the country, of the world". He gives as illustrations many slurs and proverbs, in several different languages, suggesting that Jews are stingy, greedy, miserly, or aggressive bargainers. Krefetz suggests that during the 19th century, most of the myths focused on Jews being "scurrilous, stupid, and tight-fisted", but after the Jewish emancipation and the rise of Jews to the middle and upper classes in Europe the myths evolved and began to assert that Jews were "clever, devious, and manipulative financiers out to dominate" world finances.

Foxman describes six facets of canards used by proponents of economic antisemitism:

1. All Jews are wealthy.
2. Jews are stingy and greedy.
3. Powerful and wealthy Jews control the business world.
4. Judaism emphasizes profit and materialism.
5. Jews may cheat non-Jews.
6. Jews use their wealth and power to benefit "their own kind".

These stereotypes of Jews arose from Jews' involvement in money lending, making them "greedy and unproductive" for engaging in this usury, in the eyes of the Christian world. However, Jews often had no choice but to enter this market as they were often banned from pursuing other careers. Due to restrictions on Christians lending to other Christians and charging interest, Jews were funneled into these roles. If they were not moneylenders, they often held other positions in business, such as merchants, traders, and shopkeepers.

=== Statistics ===
The Anti-Defamation League conducted a poll in Europe in 2007 that asked respondents if they agreed with the statement that "Jews have too much power in international financial markets". Polling data showed that respondents agreed with that statement as follows: 61% in Hungary, 43% in Austria, 40% in Switzerland, 40% in Belgium, 21% in the United Kingdom and 13% in the Netherlands.

Another poll conducted by the ADL in 2009 found that 31% of Europeans surveyed blamed Jews for the 2008 financial crisis.

== Motivations ==
=== Allegations of unethical business practices ===
William I. Brustein describes popular economic antisemitism in Europe before the 19th century as based on accusations of Jews using alleged unethical business practices in second-hand trade, petty commerce and money-lending.

In the 17th and the 18th centuries, anecdotal remarks from Christian merchants and traders show that there were negative feelings towards Jewish business people, who were sometimes regarded as liars or cheats. Werner Sombart hypothesized that the perceptions of cheating or dishonesty were simply a manifestation of Christian frustration at innovative commercial practices of Jews, which were contrary to the customs and traditions of the Christian merchants but were otherwise ethical.

=== Restrictions on occupations and professions ===
One form of economic antisemitism in the Middle Ages was a mass of legal restrictions imposed on the occupations and professions of Jews. Local rulers and church officials closed many professions to the Jews, pushing them into marginal occupations considered repugnant, such as tax- and rent-collecting and money-lending, but tolerated them as a "necessary evil".

Catholic doctrine then held that lending money for interest was a sin and forbade it to Christians. Not being subject to that restriction, Jews dominated this business. The Torah and the later sections of the Hebrew Bible criticise usury, but interpretations of the Biblical prohibition vary. Since few other occupations were open to them, Jews were motivated to take up money-lending. That was said to show Jews were usurers, which then led to many negative stereotypes and propaganda. Natural tensions between creditors, typically Jews, and debtors, typically Christians were added to social, political, religious and economic strains. More dangerous was lending to the monarchs of Europe, which enabled them to finance their endless wars and projects. Some monarchs would renege on repayments, often accusing their Jewish money lenders of various crimes. The nobility would also borrow large sums to maintain their lavish lifestyles. On numerous occasions the monarchs would cancel loans made by Jewish lenders, and some would also expel Jews from their realms.

Peasants who were forced to pay their taxes to Jews could personify them as the people taking their earnings and remain loyal to the lords on whose behalf the Jews worked.

Also present in the Middle Ages was the insistence by European sovereigns that "the Jews belonged to them in a peculiar way, different from that of their other subjects", which was evident in examples from the English legal code Leges Edwardi Confessoris, which portrayed the king as "tutor" and "defender" of the Jews, and of the Jews as his "possessions"; writing that "for those Jews, and all that they possess, belong to the kind, [...] as if they were his private property". Similar depictions were presented by legal scholars working for King Alfonso II of Aragon.

=== Occupational preferences ===
Throughout history, the economic status and occupations of Jews have been the subject of antisemitic stereotypes and canards. Some of the stereotypes and canards are based on economic and social restrictions placed on the Jews.

Writing about 130, the Roman satirist Juvenal mockingly depicted Jews as grotesquely poor.

Another aspect of economic antisemitism is the assertion that Jews do not produce anything of value but instead tend to serve as middlemen, acting as "parasites in the production line" of non-Jews, who are doing the real work. Krefetz lists middlemen occupations subject to that canard as distributors, shoppers, wholesalers, brokers, financiers, and retailers and writes that they are "all notably Jewish occupations".

Since the Middle Ages, Diaspora Jews have been characterised by a real or perceived "inverted occupational pyramid": they were perceived to be more prevalent in the tertiary sector, working in service jobs such as accounting, finance, medicine, law or commerce, than in the secondary and primary sectors. Perceptions that Jews are more prevalent in certain occupations or in the professions (medicine or law) have been the target of antisemitic sentiment at different periods in history.

Jews have been the targets of antisemitic criticism for their occupational preferences. For example, Robert von Mohl characterised European Jews of the 19th century as being concentrated in trade and finance, with some representation in the artistic and intellectual fields. Perceptions of overrepresentation of Jews in certain occupations have driven antisemitic sentiment in the Soviet Union.

There have been a number of theories for the reason for the "inverted occupational pyramid". Gerald Krefetz writes that the livelihood of Jews, particularly their business activities, has been influenced by religious, cultural, social and historical factors. Krefetz asserts that those factors have led to a predisposition for occupations marked by independence, professionalism and scholarship. Jews have tended to show an "entrepreneurial spirit" and "capacity for risk-taking", which lead them to innovate financial concepts like negotiable instruments of credit, international syndicates, department stores, holding companies and investment banks. Krefetz suggests that Jews have frequently chosen professions that are "portable" or involve duties as a middleman, because of their long historical background, based on trading and "heightened awareness of continual persecution". In a similar vein, Foxman argues that many medieval Jews were especially well suited for commerce because the Jewish diaspora caused many Jews to have far-flung networks of friends and family, which facilitated trade: Zvi Eckstein and Maristella Botticini argue that widespread literacy and a focus on education are primary factors in Jewish occupational tendencies. During the first century, high priest Joshua ben Gamala made it mandatory for all young Jewish boys to get a primary education. Mandatory primary education was not a common practice during this time and did not become so for the rest of the world till well over a millennium later. Another factor in widespread literacy among Jews was the focus on study and interpretation of the Torah, Mishna, and Talmud. This led to the acquisition of basic literacy and argumentative skills. These cultural and religious developments caused many Jews to adopt a skill set that was well adept for urbanization and modernization.

According to Werner Sombart, one complaint of Christian businesses was that Jews did not limit themselves to one particular trade or market but were often "jack of all trades" or "ubiquitous" and "paid no heed to the demarcation of all economic activities into separate categories". When Jews entered trades or business areas in Europe, that frequently resulted in complaints from Christian competitors that the Jews were depriving them of customers and profit.

Sombart, analysing 17th- and 18th-century Christian views of Jewish merchants, concluded that Jewish merchants were considered to pursue profit blatantly, openly and aggressively in contrast to the Christian approach, which was willing to seek profit but viewed the aggressive pursuit of profit as unseemly, uncivilized and uncouth.

Sombart also asserts another cause of Christian frustration with Jewish businesses, who imported raw materials, which was considered inappropriate by Christian merchants.

=== Jealousy ===
Niewyk and Nicosia describe economic antisemitism as focusing on "excessive" Jewish wealth and power growing out of the Jews' success in commerce, banking and professional careers.

Marvin Perry asserts that much antisemitism in the European commercial world derived from the fact that non-Jewish merchants could not match the "economies of scale and advertising promotions" of Jewish competitors. Mark Twain (Samuel Clemens) wrote, "I am persuaded that in Russia, Austria, and Germany nine-tenths of the hostility to the Jew comes from the average Christian's inability to compete successfully with the average Jew in business in either straight business or the questionable sort".

Similarly, Foxman writes that it is likely that non-Jews in medieval or Renaissance Europe had feelings of fear, vulnerability and hostility towards Jews because they resented being beholden to Jewish lenders. He claims that money-based antisemitism is a result of resentment and jealousy of Jews. Krefetz also makes a similar point: the ability of Jews to make money occasionally stirs jealousy and hate in non-Jews, contributing to a fear that Jews will "ascend too high" in the economic sphere and begin to manipulate and control world finances. Krefetz asserts that US antisemitism seems "rooted less in religion or contempt and more in envy, jealously and fear" of Jewish affluence and of the hidden power of "Jewish money".

However, Dennis Prager and Joseph Telushkin offer a different perspective. Addressing the premise that "the Jews' disproportionate wealth and concentration in business and in the professions is said to provoke anti-Jewish hostility", they assert that "while economic factors can and often do exacerbate antisemitism, [...] economic factors do not cause Jew-hatred; they only provide opportunities for it to be expressed". As one of the arguments supporting their thesis, Prager and Telushkin point out, "Jews have often suffered the worst antisemitism when they were poor, as was true with the overwhelming majority of Jews in [...] Poland and Russia, and have encountered the least amount of antisemitism when affluent as in the United States and Canada today".

=== Anti-mercantilism ===
Penslar characterised economic antisemitism as "an extreme form of the antimercantile sentiments that are rooted in pagan antiquity and the early Christian tradition".

=== Blame for the ills of capitalism ===
In the 19th century, Jews came to be so closely associated with capitalism that some even viewed the Jews as the "creators of capitalism". According to Muller, those who embraced capitalism tended to be sympathetic to Jews, and those who rejected capitalism tended to be hostile to Jews.

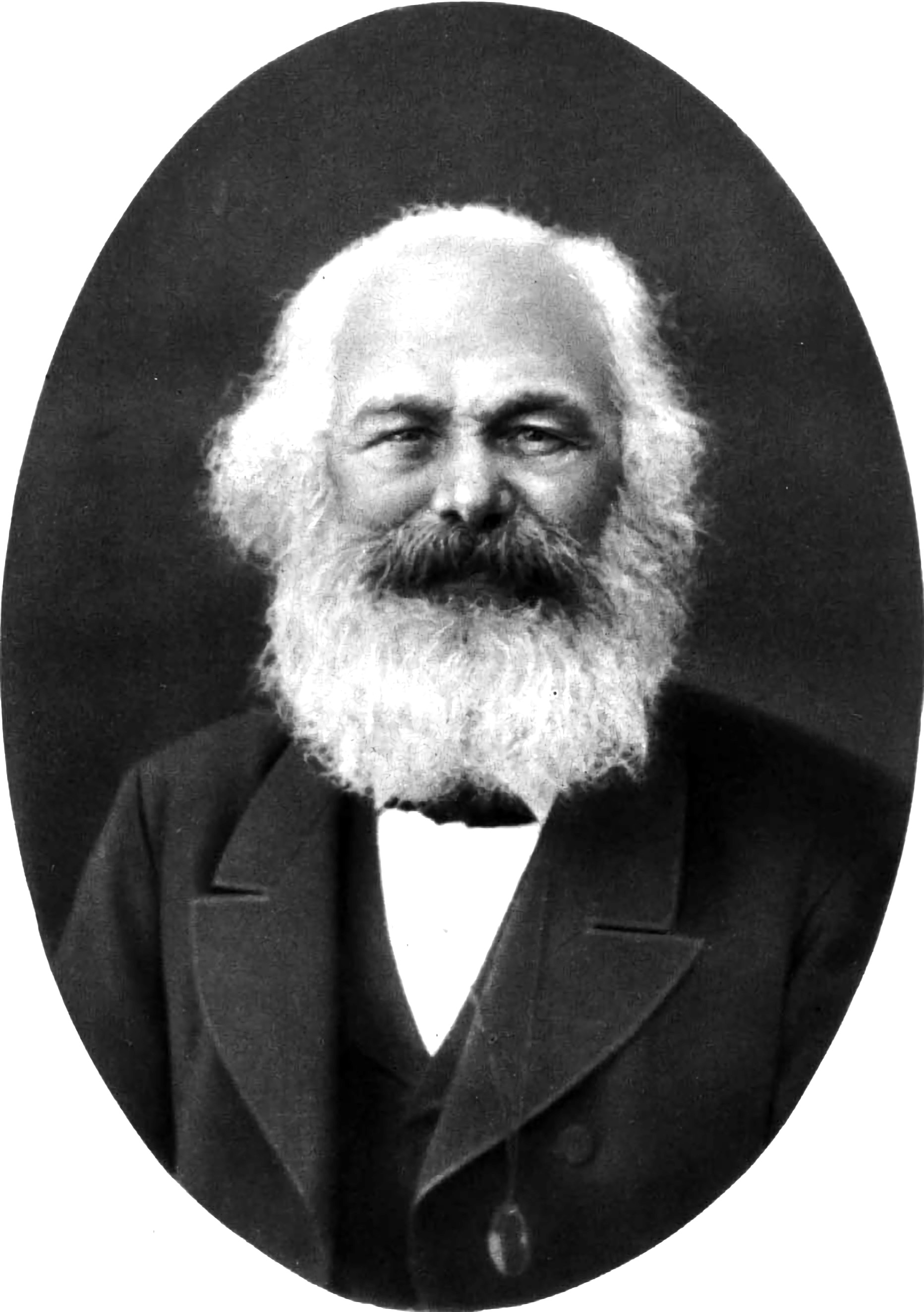
Karl Marx

Richard Levy writes that although there were local variations, most modern economic antisemitism is defined by "the scapegoating of Jews for capitalism's ills". Similarly, Steven Beller writes that economic antisemitism at the turn of the 20th century was "based on fear and envy at the supposed stranglehold of 'the Jews' over finance and accused Jews of being behind the depredations of capitalism on the traditional economy".

Laurel Platt attributes antisemitic attitudes that extend back to the Middle Ages for the tendency to blame Jews for the problems of capitalism and urbanisation that arose in the late 19th century.

Scholars have noted the antisemitic attitudes of mid-19th-century French socialists such as Charles Fourier and Pierre-Joseph Proudhon. Fourier vilified the Jews as the "incarnation of commerce: parasitical, deceitful, traitorous and unproductive". Proudhon used even more vehement invective, attacking Jews as the "incarnation of finance capitalism" and characterizing them as anti-producers by temperament. Alphonse Toussenel, a follower of Fourier, wrote finance, meaning the Jews, was dominating and ruining France. Similarly, Auguste Blanqui commented in his correspondence on Jews as being usurers and "Shylocks".

Karl Marx – himself from a Jewish background – argued that earning a living from collecting interest or acting as a middleman was an unjust and exploitive aspect of capitalism. Because many Jews were employed in occupations that Marx considered "non-productive", he singled out Jews for particular criticism and blamed Judaism for the exploitation and alienation of workers. Moses Mendelssohn argued to the contrary that commercial activity was just as valid and beneficial as manual labour: "Many a merchant, while quietly engaged at his desk in forming commercial speculations, [...] produces [...] more than the most active and noisy mechanic or tradesman".

Penslar wrote that Marx argued not that Jews merely embraced capitalism but that they "embodied" it. Penslar stated that Marx claimed that the Jewish religious culture shared many key characteristics of capitalism, such as materialism and egoism.

Marx concluded that Judaism was responsible for the alienation of many Jewish workers. In his 1844 work On the Jewish Question, Marx distinguished between the "Sabbath Jew" and the "everyday Jew." Marx argued that, practically speaking, everyday Judaism was a commercial practice, not a theology. According to Perry, Marx believed that "Jews are the embodiment of capitalism (money-system) in action and the creators of all its evil consequences for humanity".

Several other commentators have noted that economic antisemitism increases in times of recession or economic hardship, such as during the Depression of 1873.

=== Identification of Jews as socialists or communists ===
Jewish Bolshevism is an antisemitic and anti-communist canard that is based on the claim that Jews have been the driving force behind or are disproportionately involved in communism, sometimes more specifically Russian Bolshevism.

The expression was the title of a pamphlet, The Jewish Bolshevism, and became current after the 1917 October Revolution in Russia, featuring prominently in the propaganda of the anti-Bolshevik "White" forces during the Russian Civil War. That idea spread worldwide in the 1920s with the publication and circulation of The Protocols of the Elders of Zion. That was popularised by the Jewish ancestry of many leading Bolsheviks, most notably Leon Trotsky, during and after the October Revolution. Daniel Pipes says that "primarily through the Protocols of the Elders of Zion, the Whites spread these charges to an international audience". James Webb wrote that it is rare to find an antisemitic source after 1917 that "does not stand in debt to the White Russian analysis of the Revolution".

The label "Judeo-Bolshevism" was used in Nazi Germany to equate Jews with communists, implying that communism served Jewish interests and/or that all Jews were communists. Jews and Communists were both blamed for having allegedly betrayed Germany during World War I and resulting in Germany signing The Treaty of Versailles, in what is known as the "stab-in-the-back myth". In Poland before World War II, Żydokomuna was used in the same way to allege that Jews were conspiring with the Soviet Union to invade Poland. According to André Gerrits, "The myth of Jewish Communism was one of the most popular and widespread political prejudices in the first half of the 20th century, in Eastern Europe in particular". The allegation still sees use in antisemitic publications and websites today.

== Historical development ==
Jerome Chanes identifies six stages in the historical development of antisemitism:

1. Pre-Christian anti-Judaism in ancient Greece and Rome, which was primarily ethnic in nature
2. Christian antisemitism in antiquity and the Middle Ages, which was religious in nature and has extended into modern times
3. Traditional Muslim antisemitism, which was, at least in its classical form, nuanced in that Jews were a protected class
4. Political, social and economic antisemitism of Enlightenment and post-Enlightenment Europe, which laid the groundwork for racial antisemitism
5. Racial antisemitism, which arose in the 19th century and culminated in Nazism
6. Contemporary antisemitism, which has been labelled by some as the New Antisemitism

=== Middle Ages ===
According to Norman Roth, "far more attention has [been] focused on Jewish moneylending than on any other occupation". He asserts that general histories of the medieval period, if they mention Jews at all, refer to them as moneylenders or as being involved in the slave trade. He asserts that there is not a great abundance of research on commercial activity of Jews in the Middle East. He accuses scholars of making "sweeping generalizations that would be "laughable and unthinkable in any other context".

Throughout the Middle Ages, Jews were subjected to a wide range of legal disabilities and restrictions, some of which lasted until the end of the 19th century. At times, even moneylending and peddling were forbidden to them. The number of Jews permitted to reside in different places was limited. They were concentrated in ghettos, they were not allowed to own land, they were subject to discriminatory taxes on entering cities or districts other than their own, they were forced to swear special Jewish Oaths, and they suffered a variety of other measures.

The exclusion of Jews from many trades and craft guilds began after the First Crusade (1096–1099). The exclusion often came at the urging of the clergy, local guild members, state and local governments. Jews were excluded in certain places from certain crafts as they were excluded by the craft guilds in certain trades and, indirectly, agriculture by bans on land-ownership. That often led Jews into peddling, second-hand goods, pawnbroking and moneylending.

In Southern Europe, Christian competitors of Jews in several occupations, including moneylending, asked leaders to expel Jews to reduce competition.

The result of those occupational restrictions was to push Jews into marginal roles, considered socially inferior, such as tax and rent collecting and moneylending, which were tolerated as a "necessary evil".

Although Jews had not been particularly associated with moneylending in antiquity, a stereotype of them doing so was developed beginning in the 11th century. Jonathan Frankel notes that the stereotype, though obviously an exaggeration, had a solid basis in reality. While not all Jews were moneylenders, Jews were probably disproportionately represented in that trade.

Catholic doctrine then held that lending money for interest was a sin and so was an occupation forbidden to Christians. Not being subject to the restriction, Jews made that business their own despite possible criticism of usury in the Torah and later sections of the Hebrew Bible.

Howard Sachar wrote that the occupations that were left for Jews to engage in were often the occupations that Christians disdained, such as peddling, hawking and moneylending. He estimated that three fourths of Jews in Central and Western Europe were occupied in those occupations in the 18th century. Sachar stated, "In their [Jews'] struggle for livelihood, they generated a sizable underclass of beggars, fencers, pimps, even robbers, thereby creating a self-fulfilling gentile scenario of Jews, one that would endlessly invoked by Jew-haters throughout the late eighteenth and nineteenth centuries". Similarly, Todeschini wrote that the perception of Jews as dishonest and immoral became a self-fulfilling prophecy because the exclusion from other professions forced them to engage in moneylending and other marginal professions that were regarded as unethical.

One of the reasons that moneylending was open to Jews as a profession was that European Christian culture regarded moneylending as sinful or immoral. That caused Christians to avoid the profession, leaving a vacuum for which Jews could fill. The Christian abhorrence of moneylending was rooted in the Old Testament laws of Exodus 22:25, Deuteronomy 23:19–20, Leviticus 25:35–37 and Psalms 15:5. Those biblical rules were emphasized in the Middle Ages again in the Lateran councils, particularly the Second Lateran Council in 1139, and the Fourth Lateran Council in 1215, but proclamations of the Catholic Church outlawed excessively-high interest rates, not all interest.

Max Dimont asserts that moneylending, of all professions, was the "most reviled". The occupation of moneylending was considered a "degenerate" profession in the 14th century by many Christians, including Franciscans in England such as John Peckham, who engaged in discussions of usury and debt.

One reason that Christians permitted Jews to engage in moneylending, despite it being considered a sinful activity, was that Jews were already considered to be damned and so they may as well commit the sin of usury, thus saving the souls of Christians who would otherwise be forced to lend money.

Moneylending became an important occupation for Jews, beginning in the early Middle Ages, and continuing into the modern era. Moneylending was first noted as a significant occupation in the 9th century, and in the 10th century, some Jews were large scale financiers. That prevalence in the field of moneylending has led to scholarly debate, which considered why Jews gravitated towards money-related occupations.

Dimont writes that the Jewish role in moneylending was the most important contribution of Jews to medieval society since the feudal culture might have failed without a flow of capital. Foxman writes that the moneylending profession gave rise to the modern financial industries, including banking. Over time, Jews became very skilled at both commerce and moneylending. Some European leaders encouraged Jews to engage in moneylending because it enhanced economic activity and provided personal benefit to the leaders themselves. In addition, leaders benefited from Jewish moneylenders by collecting fees and taxes. Throughout Europe, Jews filled the role of Court Jew for virtually every seat of nobility. However, some European leaders expelled Jews from their countries (England 1290, France 1306 and 1394), depriving themselves of the economic benefits provided by the moneylenders.

Although most scholars attribute the large number of Jews in the moneylending occupation to the exclusion from other crafts and trades, Werner Sombart, in his The Jews and Modern Capitalism, asserted that moneylending was an occupation that many Jews preferred and chose. As evidence, he pointed out his book that Jews had heavily been engaged in moneylending before the era when they were excluded from trades and crafts and also that Jews' religion and culture predisposed them to commercial and financial endeavours. Because Sombart speculated on anthropological and racial explanations, his work has been described as antisemitic and racist. However, some modern scholars characterise his presentation of the topic as sympathetic and valid. Sombart's work was a watershed in the scholarship of Jewish culture because it prompted subsequent historians and economists to begin to examine the relationship between Jews and money.

Sombart contends that many of the trade and craft prohibitions were rarely enforced and so Jews could have found employment in many of the proscribed occupations if they had desired. However, Sombart writes that Jews were absolutely excluded from government jobs, that exclusion being more significant than the putative trade exclusions. He also suggests that exclusion from government jobs had some incidental benefits for Jews because it freed them from problems associated with political partisanship.

=== Early modern period ===
Penslar asserted that the "more fantastic aspects of medieval antisemitism, which include the demonization of Jews, and accusations of ritual murder and black magic were (incompletely) suppressed, to some extent, by the combined forces of Protestantism and the modern state", but economic antisemitism did not share the same fate because "it has fit as well into a rationalized worldview as a magical one, into a secular sensibility as a theological one".

According to Perry and Schweitzer, "Jewish economic endeavors labored under the stigma, variously, of being 'unproductive', sterile, parasitic, usurious, dangerous, dishonest, criminal and the like".

The trope, and economic antisemitism as a whole, also strengthened in the 17th century, when Jewish spokesmen used the association between Jews and capitalism to protest their exclusion from residing in many areas of Europe. They argued that Jews could provide economic help to host countries, advertising the "unique mercantile qualifications of the Jews" to encourage their toleration in European societies.

For example, in 1638, Venetian Rabbi Simone Luzatto contended that Jews were suited to be commercial agents because of the skills they developed from their exclusion from other career options. Similarly, in 1655, Rabbi Manasseh ben Israel from Amsterdam, in an attempt to advocate for the readmission of Jews to England, emphasized the financial expertise among Jews and that "God had implanted a commercial talent in te Jews." These arguments were intended to promote the toleration and inclusion of Jews in the 17th century but also reinforced the perception of Jews as inherently and exclusively capitalistic.

=== 19th-century Europe ===
Prior to around 1820 in Europe, most Jews were peddlers and shopkeepers, but after the Jewish emancipation, in the 19th century, Jews were able to migrate to the middle and upper classes and to engage in a wider variety of occupations. In 1859, the Austrian Empire had guilds abolished, which was an opportunity for Jews to enter "liberal professions" such as law, journalism and medicine.

In the mid-19th century, a number of German Jews founded investment banking firms, which later became mainstays of the industry. Most prominent Jewish banks in the US were investment banks, rather than commercial banks. Jonathan Knee postulates that Jews were forced to focus on the development of investment banks because they were excluded from the commercial banking sector.

After legislation supporting the equality of French Jews with other citizens during the French Revolution, similar laws promoting Jewish emancipation were enacted in the early 19th century in parts of Europe over which France had influence. The old laws restricting them to ghettos and the many laws that limited their rights to property, worship and occupation were rescinded.

Despite the lifting of official economic restrictions against Jews throughout Europe, economic stereotypes and unofficial or semiofficial restrictions on the economic activity of Jews continued. Bernard Lazare commented, "Economic antisemitism to-day is stronger than it ever was, for the reason that to-day, more than ever, the Jew appears powerful and rich. Formerly he was not seen: he remained hidden in his Ghetto, far from Christian eyes. He had but one care, to conceal his wealth, that wealth of which tradition regarded him as the gatherer, and not the proprietor. The day he was freed from his disabilities, the day the restrictions put to his activities fell away, the Jew showed himself in public".

Howard Sachar wrote that throughout much of the 19th century, popular literature and theatrical performances in the Austrian and German empires were merciless in their caricatures of the Rothschilds as "Jewish cash bags" or "Jews behind the throne". Those caricatures evolved from mere political satire to more-overt antisemitism in the early 20th century. Sachar noted the irony that Jewish proponents of communism, such as Marx, were partially responsible for antisemitism targeting the relationship between Jews and capitalism.

One example of economic antisemitism was promulgated in France by Édouard Drumont in his 1879 pamphlet What we Demand of Modern Jewry that contrasted the poverty of French workers with the wealth of Jewish bankers and industrialists.

=== 19th-century United States ===
By the time of the American Civil War, tensions over race and immigration and economic competition between Jews and non-Jews combined to produce the worst American outbreak of antisemitism until then. Americans on both sides of the slavery issue denounced Jews as disloyal war profiteers and accused them of driving Christians out of business and aiding and abetting the enemy.

Major General Ulysses S. Grant was influenced by such sentiments and issued General Order No. 11, expelling Jews from areas under his control in western Tennessee:

The Jews, as a class violating every regulation of trade established by the Treasury Department and also department orders, are hereby expelled [...] within twenty-four hours from the receipt of this order.

That order was quickly rescinded by President Abraham Lincoln, but it already been enforced in a number of towns. According to Jerome Chanes, Lincoln's revocation of Grant's order was based primarily on "constitutional strictures against [...] the federal government singling out any group for special treatment". Chanes characterised the order as "unique in the history of the United States" because it was the only overtly-antisemitic official action of the US government.

Grant later issued an order "that no Jews are to be permitted to travel on the road southward". His aide, Colonel John V. DuBois, ordered "all cotton speculators, Jews, and all vagabonds with no honest means of support" to leave the district. "The Israelites especially should be kept out... they are such an intolerable nuisance".

From the early 1880s, declining farm prices also prompted elements of the Populist movement to blame the perceived evils of capitalism and industrialism on Jews because of their alleged racial/religious inclination for financial exploitation. More specifically, they alleged financial manipulations by Jewish financiers such as the Rothschilds. Although Jews played only a minor role in the nation's commercial banking system, the prominence of Jewish investment bankers, such as the Rothschilds in Europe, Jacob Schiff, and Kuhn, Loeb & Co. in New York City, made the claims of antisemites believable to some. In the 1890s, Mary Elizabeth Lease, an American farming activist and populist from Kansas, frequently blamed the Rothschilds and "British bankers" for farmers' ills.

The Morgan Bonds scandal injected populist antisemitism into the 1896 presidential campaign. It was disclosed that President Grover Cleveland had sold bonds to a syndicate that included J. P. Morgan and the Rothschilds. The syndicate was now selling the bonds for a profit, and the Populists used that as an opportunity to uphold their view of history that both Washington, DC, and Wall Street were in the hands of international Jewish banking houses.

Another focus of antisemitism was the allegation that Jews were at the middle of an international conspiracy to fix the currency, and thus the economy, to a single gold standard.

=== The Protocols of the Elders of Zion ===
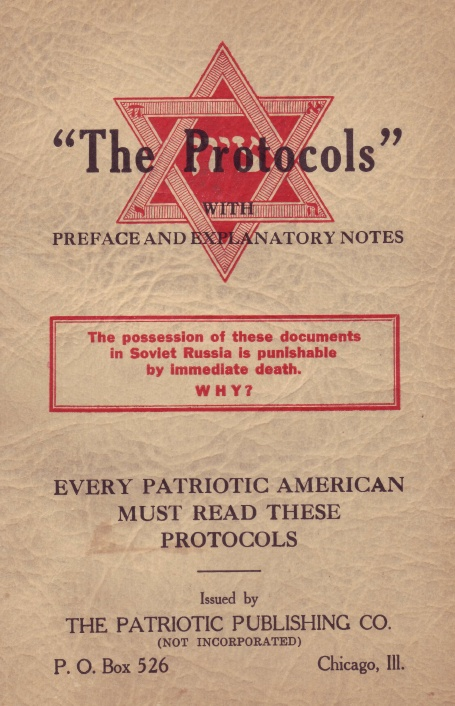
The Protocols of the Elders of Zion

The Protocols of the Elders of Zion, an antisemitic text, purported to describe a Jewish plan to achieve global domination and to document the minutes of a late-19th-century meeting attended by world Jewish leaders, the "Elders of Zion", conspiring to take over the world. The fraudulent Protocols included plans to subvert the morals of the non-Jewish world, to control the world's economies by Jewish bankers, to have the press in Jewish control of the press and ultimately destroy civilisation. The document of 24 "protocols" was analysed by Steven Jacobs and Mark Weitzman, who documented several protocols that suggested that Jews would employ control of the worlds banking system to dominate the world. Those that focus on economic issues are 2, 3, 4, 21 and 22.

=== Henry Ford and the Dearborn Independent ===
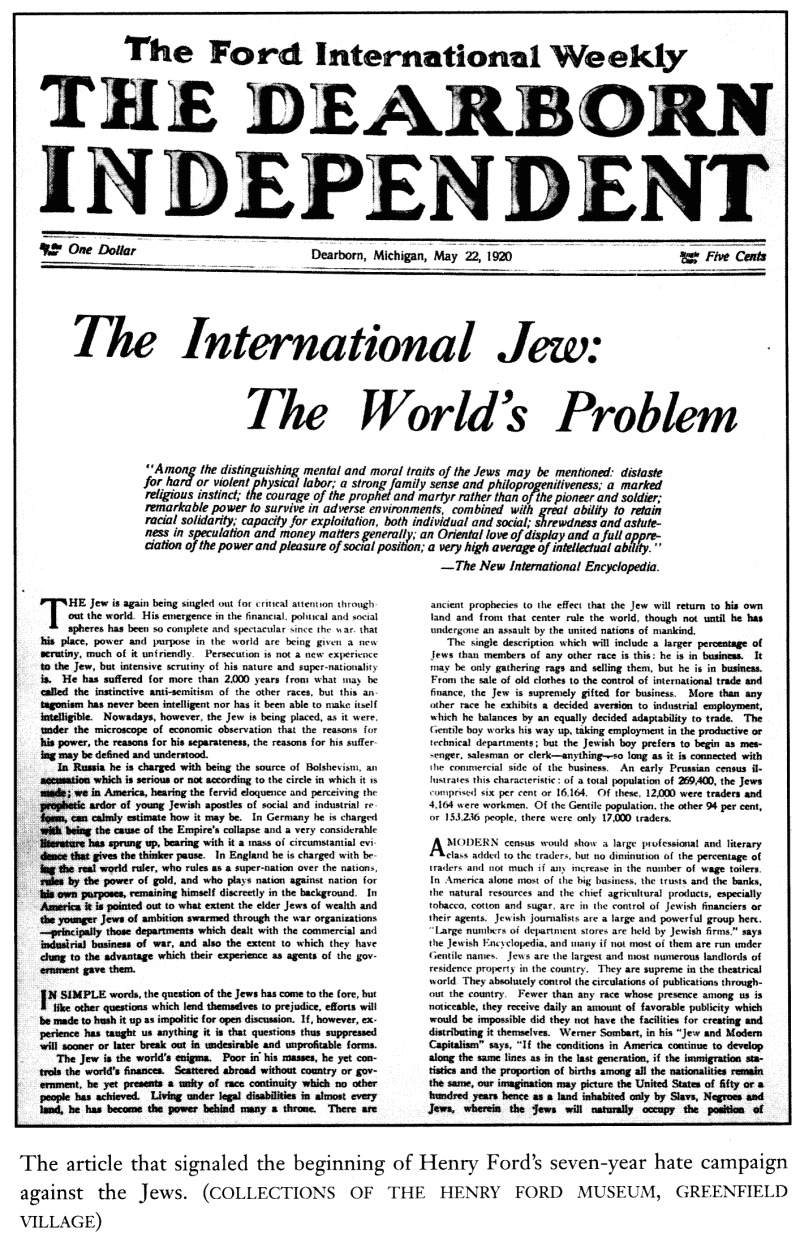
The Dearborn Independent

Henry Ford was a non-interventionist who opposed both world wars and believed that Jews were responsible for starting wars to profit from them: "International financiers are behind all war. They are what is called the international Jew: German Jews, French Jews, English Jews, American Jews. I believe that in all those countries except our own the Jewish financier is supreme [...] here the Jew is a threat". Ford also shared Marx's view that Jews were responsible for capitalism. He believed that in their role as financiers, they did not contribute anything of value to society.

In 1915, during World War I, Ford blamed Jews for instigating the war: "I know who caused the war: German-Jewish bankers". In 1925, Ford said, "What I oppose most is the international Jewish money power that is met in every war. That is what I oppose – a power that has no country and that can order the young men of all countries out to death". According to Steven Watts, Ford's antisemitism was partially caused by a desire for world peace.

Ford became aware of The Protocols of the Elders of Zion. Believing them to be legitimate document, he published portions of it in his newspaper, The Dearborn Independent. From 1920 to 1921, the Dearborn Independent also carried a series of articles expanding on the themes of financial control by Jews. One of the articles, "Jewish Power and America's Money Famine", asserted that the power exercised by Jews over the nation's supply of money was insidious by helping deprive farmers and others outside the banking coterie of money when they needed it most. The article asked, "Where is the American gold supply? [...] It may be in the United States but it does not belong to the United States". It drew the conclusion that Jews controlled the gold supply and thus American money. Another of the articles, "Jewish Idea Molded Federal Reserve System", was a reflection of Ford's suspicion of the Federal Reserve System and its proponent, Paul Warburg. Ford believed that the Federal Reserve was secretive and insidious. Those articles gave rise to claims of antisemitism against Ford, and in 1929, he signed a statement apologising for the articles.

=== Nazi Germany ===
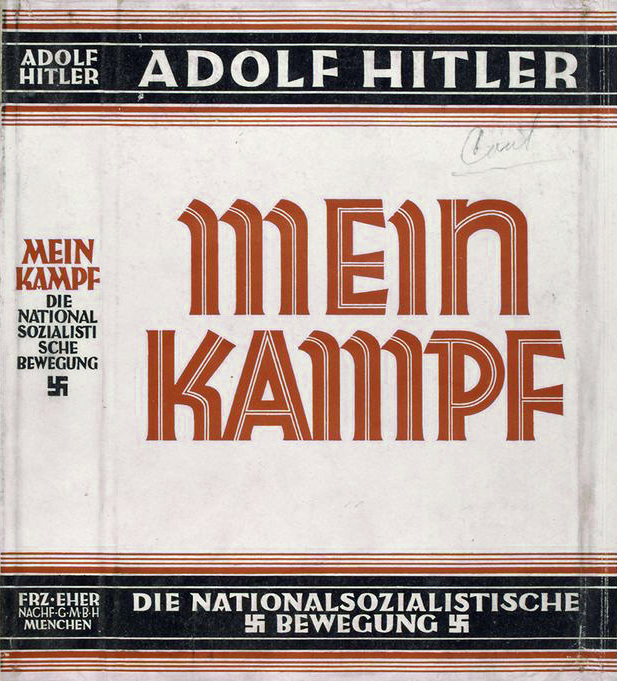
Mein Kampf by Adolf Hitler

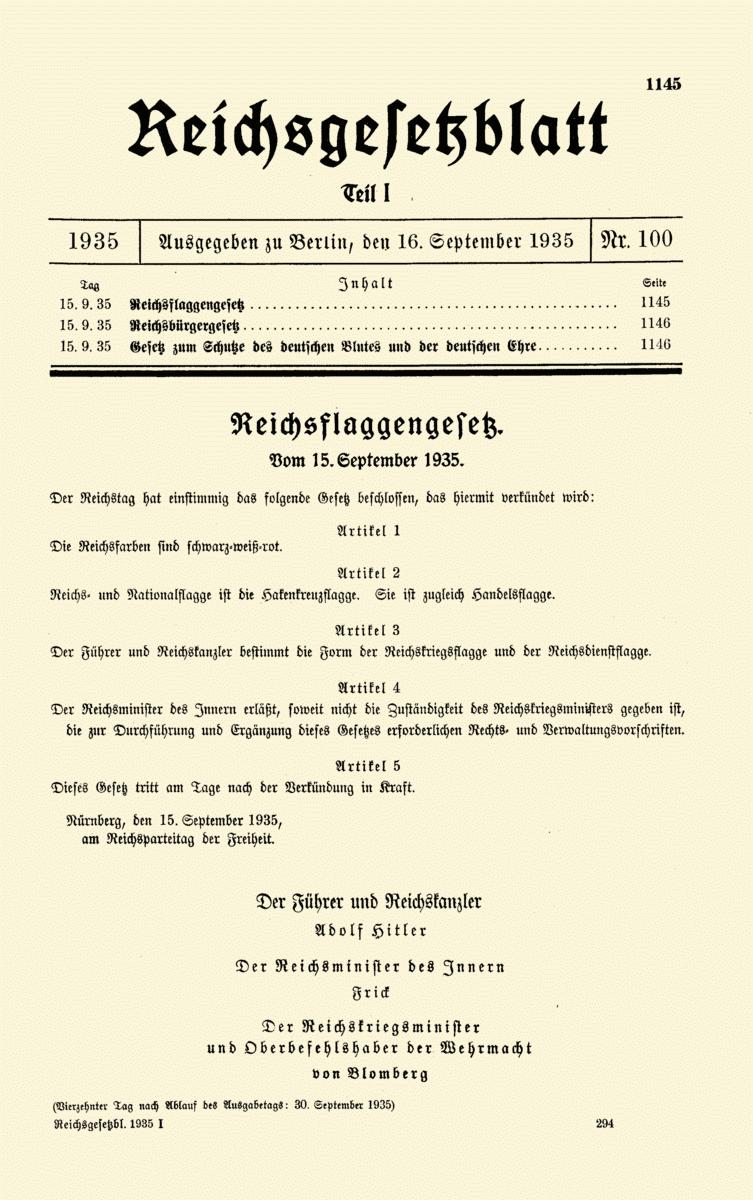
Title page of the German government gazette Reichsgesetzblatt issue proclaiming the Nuremberg Race Laws

Antisemitism and the persecution of Jews represented a central tenet of Nazism. In its 25-point Party Program, published in 1920, Nazi Party members publicly declared their intention to segregate Jews from "Aryan" society and to abrogate Jews' political, legal and civil rights. Nazi leaders began to carry out their pledge to persecute German Jews soon after their assumption of power.

Adolf Hitler rose to power in Germany during a time of economic depression. Hitler blamed Jews for Germany's economic woes. Hitler's book Mein Kampf (German for "My Struggle") included the following passage, which was representative of much antisemitism in Germany and Europe: "The Jewish train of thought in all this is clear. The Bolshevization of Germany – that is, the extermination of the national völkisch German intelligentsia to make possible the sweating of the German working class under the yoke of Jewish world finance – is conceived only as a preliminary to the further extension of this Jewish tendency of world conquest [...] If our people and our state become the victim of these blood-thirsty and avaricious Jewish tyrants of nations, the whole earth will sink into the snares of this octopus".

From 1933, repressive laws were passed against Jews, culminating in the Nuremberg Laws, which removed most of the rights of citizenship from Jews by using a racial definition based on descent, rather than any religious definition of who was a Jew. Sporadic violence against the Jews became widespread with the Kristallnacht riots, which targeted Jewish homes, businesses and places of worship, killing hundreds across Germany, including the newly-annexed Austria.

The ideologically-antisemitic agenda of that culminated in the genocide of the Jews of Europe, known as the Holocaust.

The first major law to curtail the rights of Jewish German citizens was the Law for the Restoration of the Professional Civil Service on 7 April 1933. Those who were Jewish or "politically unreliable" were now excluded from state service.

That was the German authorities' first formulation of the so-called Aryan paragraph, which excluded Jews (and often other "non-Aryans") from organizations, professions, and other aspects of public life. In April 1933, German law restricted the number of Jewish students at German schools and universities. In the same month, further legislation sharply curtailed "Jewish activity" in the medical and legal professions. Subsequent laws and decrees restricted reimbursement of Jewish doctors from state health insurance funds.

On 1 April 1933, Jewish doctors, shops, lawyers and stores were boycotted. Only six days later, the Law for the Restoration of the Professional Civil Service was passed, banning Jews from being employed in government. Jews were now indirectly and directly dissuaded or banned from privileged and upper-level positions reserved for "Aryan" Germans. From then on, Jews were forced to work at more-menial positions, beneath non-Jews.

Using the Weimar-era Reich Flight Tax, the Nazis subjected emigrants to punitive taxes as a form of "legalized theft", with a particular focus on Jews fleeing the country.

In 1936, Jews were banned from all professional jobs, effectively preventing them from exerting any influence in education, politics, higher education and industry. There was no longer any practical ability to stop the anti-Jewish actions that spread across the German economy.

In 1937 and 1938, German authorities again stepped up legislative persecution of German Jews. The government set out to impoverish Jews and remove them from the German economy by requiring them to register their property. Even before the Olympics, the Nazi government had initiated "Aryanization", the dismissal of Jewish workers and managers of a company and/or the takeover of Jewish-owned businesses by non-Jewish Germans, who bought them at bargain prices, fixed by government or Nazi party officials. On 1 March 1938, government contracts could no longer be awarded to Jewish businesses. On 30 September, the government forbade Jewish doctors to treat non-Jews, and it revoked the licences of Jewish lawyers.

After the Kristallnacht (commonly known as "Night of Broken Glass") pogrom of 9–10 November 1938, Nazi leaders stepped up "Aryanization" efforts and enforced measures that increasingly succeeded in physically isolating and segregating Jews from their fellow Germans. Jews were barred from all public schools and universities as well as from cinemas, theatres and sports facilities. In many cities, Jews were forbidden to enter designated "Aryan" zones. German decrees and ordinances expanded the ban on Jews in professional life. By September 1938, for instance, Jewish physicians were effectively banned from treating "Aryan" patients.

By April 1939, nearly all Jewish companies had either collapsed under financial pressure and declining profits or had been forced to sell out to the Nazi German government. That further reduced Jews' rights as human beings, and they were in many ways officially separated from the German populace.

=== Occupied Europe ===
Antisemitism was particularly virulent in Vichy France during World War II. The antisemitic demands of right-wing groups were implemented under the collaborating Vichy regime of Marshal Philippe Pétain after the defeat of the French by the German army in 1940. A law on the status of Jews that year, followed by one in 1941, purged Jews from employment in administrative, civil service and judicial posts; most professions and even from the entertainment industry, restricting most of them to menial jobs.

=== Soviet Union ===
William Korey describes a 1977 Academy of Sciences of the USSR report, International Zionism: History and Politics, alleging that "Jewish bourgeoisie", using Zionism as a cover, sought "the expansion of their positions in the economy of the largest capitalist states [...] and in the economic system of world capitalism as a whole". The report specifically mentioned six Wall Street investment firms: Lazard Brothers, Lehman Brothers, Kuhn, Loeb & Co., Loeb Rhoades, Bache & Co. and Goldman-Sachs. The report also expounded on the "clannish" theory that Jewish financial firms around the world were related by family-ties and collaborated unethically.

=== 20th-century United States ===
In 1922, educational discrimination became a national issue when Harvard College announced that it was considering a quota system for Jewish students. Although it was eventually dropped, the quota was enforced in many colleges by underhanded techniques. As late as 1945, Dartmouth openly admitted and defended a quota system against Jewish students. To limit the growing number of Jewish students, a number of private liberal arts universities and medical and dental schools instituted a quota system referred to as numerus clausus. Those included Harvard University, Columbia University, Cornell University, and Boston University. In 1925, Yale University, which already had such admissions preferences as "character", "solidity" and "physical characteristics", added a program of legacy preference admission spots for children of Yale alumni in an explicit attempt to put the brakes on the rising percentage of Jews in the student body. That was soon copied by other Ivy League and other schools, and admissions of Jews were kept down to 10% until the 1950s. Such policies were for the most part discarded during the early 1960s, but the last vestiges were not eliminated at Yale University until 1970.

Jews encountered resistance when they tried to move into white-collar and professional positions. Banking, insurance, public utilities, medical schools, hospitals, large law firms and faculty positions restricted the entrance of Jews. That era of "polite" antisemitism by social discrimination underwent an ideological escalation in the 1930s.

=== Federal Reserve System ===
The Anti-Defamation League documented one of the more common aspects of money-related antisemitism: the claim that the United States' Federal Reserve System was created by Jews and is run by them for their own financial benefit. The ADL gives examples of that myth repeated by Aryan Nations, Louis Farrakhan, Sheldon Emry and Wickliffe Vennard. Another example cited is Bo Gritz, the 1992 Presidential candidate of the Populist Party, in his book Called to Serve.

Foxman rebuts the Federal Reserve myth, in his book Jews and Money, by explaining that the Federal Reserve is a quasi-public entity that was created and is controlled by the US Congress.

=== Islamic world ===
Various incarnations of money-related antisemitism have been documented in the Islamic world. In a 1968 conference at the University of Cairo, a speaker proclaimed that "money-worship [is among the] inherent qualities in them [the Jews] [...] They are characterized by avarice and many other vices, which arose from selfishness, love of worldly life, and envy [...]"

Arabs' discourse on the Holocaust displays various instances of economic antisemitic rhetoric. One such example is Shaykh Muhammad Sayyid al-Tantawi's 1997 book The Israelites in the Qur'an. He was an integral part of the religious leadership in Egypt, which purported the idea that Jews had undermined Islam throughout history. In the book, Jews are characterised as a swindler people starting both world wars for selfish economic gain and taking over the German economy as a result of their sinister fiscal techniques. Tantawi used that perception of Jews as a justification for Hitler's genocidal agenda and said that it is "little wonder that the Germans rose against them several times and employed all the means of killing, expulsion, and pillage".

The Murabitun organization has published policy statements that are antisemitic and concentrate on breaking Jewish control of the world financial system.

According to Robert S. Wistrich, both Hamas and Hezbollah routinely blame "the world banking crisis on the Jews who supposedly control the American government and economy".

Osama bin Laden, in his 2002 Letter to America, wrote, "You [United States] are the nation that permits usury, which has been forbidden by all religions. yet you build your economy and investments on Usury. As a result of all this, in all its different forms and guises, the Jews have taken control of your economy, through which they have taken control of your media, and now control all aspects of your life making you their servants and achieving aims at their expense."

Mahmoud Ahmadinejad, the president of Iran, told the United Nations General Assembly in 2008 that the Zionists "have been dominating an important portion of the financial and monetary centers [...] in a deceitful, complex, and furtive manner".

Foxman also identifies editorials, cartoons and news stories throughout the Middle East as sources that repeat money-related antisemitic myths.

=== Nation of Islam ===
The Nation of Islam has promulgated some money-based antisemitic myths, particularly in its book The Secret Relationship Between Blacks and Jews. Volume 1 claims that Jews played a major role in the Atlantic slave trade and profited from black slavery. Volume 2 of the book alleges that Jews in America exploited black labour and innovation in cotton, textiles, music and banking, for example. The book also asserts that Jews have promoted a myth of black racial inferiority.

Nation of Islam leader Louis Farrakhan has also elaborated on these concepts in speeches, making statements such as "The Federal Reserve is the synagogue of Satan, [...] the House of Rothschild" and "The Black man and woman have always been looked upon as the 'property' of White America, and particularly, members of the Jewish community".

=== 20th-century populism ===
==== White supremacists ====
In the 1970s, the white supremacist movement in the United States adopted the position that Jews are "parasites and vultures" who are attempting to enslave Aryans by dominating world banking and media. White supremacists such as William L. Pierce and Eustace Mullins have repeated money-based antisemitic myths.

The American militia movement is also a source of money-based antisemitism. Its leaders include Bo Gritz, who alleges that the Federal Reserve System is controlled by Jews, and John Trochman, who believes that the nation's problems are the fault of a Jewish "banking elite".

==== New economic antisemitism ====
According to Rosensaft and Bauer, the international Arab boycott constitutes a "new economic antisemitism". Irwin Cotler elaborates that the new economic antisemitism involves Arab countries applying an international restrictive covenant against corporations in other countries by conditioning their trade with Arab countries to the following:

- refrain from doing business with Israel (secondary boycott)
- refrain from doing business with another corporation that may be doing business with Israel (tertiary boycott)
- refrain from hiring or promoting Jews within the corporation.

=== 21st-century ===
The topic of economic antisemitism came to the public spot-light yet again when NBA player LeBron James quoted on Instagram a line of lyric from a song by 21 Savage "We been gettin' that Jewish money, everything is kosher". James apologized for his behaviour, but pleaded ignorance by stating that he "actually thought it was a compliment, and obviously it wasn't through the lens of a lot of people." This episode came one year after James said that "racism may appear hidden, but it is alive every single day in the US, and across the world."

Ignorance among factions of the left over economic forms of antisemitism have been blamed for the Labour Party's recent antisemitism controversy. Siobhain McDonagh received controversy from the left wing of the party after she appeared to agree with a statement put forward by John Humphreys that "to be anti-capitalist you have to be antisemitic". On October 8th, 2024, Dublin city councillor Punam Rane said that "the entire US economy today is ruled by the Jews, by Israel" in the context of a debate on restricting economic ties to West Bank settlements.

== In literature ==
Jews have been portrayed as miserly and greedy in both belles-lettres and popular literature.

=== Shylock ===
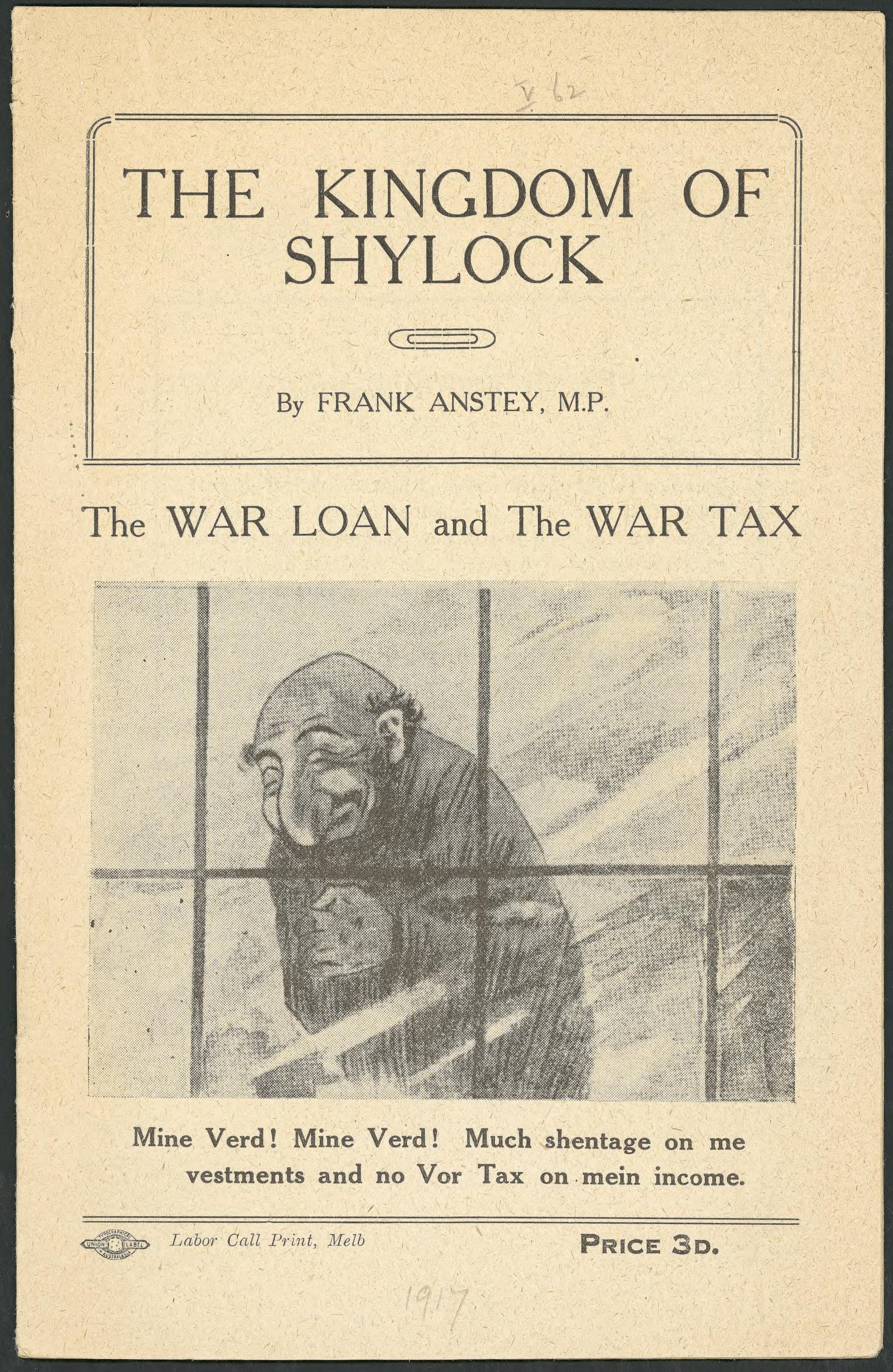
Front cover of The Kingdom of Shylock (1917), a pamphlet by Australian politician Frank Anstey asserting Jewish control of banking and finance

The character Shylock in William Shakespeare's play The Merchant of Venice is a Jewish moneylender who is portrayed in unscrupulous and avaricious. Penslar asserts that Shylock is a metaphor for the Jewish "otherness" and that he represents the "inseparability of Jewish religious, social, and economic distinctiveness". Gerald Krefetz calls Shylock a "classic image" that has haunted Jews ever since it first appeared since it made Jews a scapegoat.

Historian Richard Hofstadter wrote that Shylock was used as the basis for "crankery" by Charles Coughlin and Ezra Pound.

John Gross stated that Shylock represents "the sinister international financier" on both sides of the Atlantic Ocean.

Foxman contends that Shylock may have contributed to antisemitism in Japan since The Merchant of Venice has been translated into Japanese more than any other play by Shakespeare.

=== Fagin ===
The character Fagin in Charles Dickens's novel Oliver Twist is depicted as avaricious and has served to support antisemitic stereotypes. Dickens claimed that he held Jews in high regard and that the depiction of Fagin was simply a caricature that was based upon actual persons. In an apparent demonstration of remorse, he removed many occurrences of the word "Jew" from later editions of the work.

=== Ezra Pound ===
Poet Ezra Pound mentions Jewish attitudes towards money in his The Cantos, which has primarily economic and governance themes. In the poem, Jews are implicated in sinister manipulations of the money supply.

Foxman asserts, "The Cantos include a "vicious diatribe against interest-paying finance" and that it has sections with antisemitic passages. In Canto 52, "Stinkschuld's [Rothschilds] sin drawing vengeance, poor yitts paying for / Stinkschuld [Rothschilds] / paying for a few big jews' vendetta on goyim" had the name Rothschilds replaced by "Stinkschulds" at the insistence of Pound's publisher.

== See also ==
- Jewish business ethics
- Jewish views of poverty, wealth and charity
- Secular Jewish culture#Economic activity
- Conspiracy theories about George Soros

== Sources ==
- ADL Report, "Jewish 'Control' of the Federal Reserve: A Classic Anti-Semitic Myth", July 1995
- Aris, Stephen, The Jews in Business, Cape, 1970
- Arkin, Marcus, "Not of Pure Aryan Stock: The Jewish Impact on the Economic Transformation of Modern Germany", in A new Jewry: America since the Second World War, Peter Medding (Ed.), Oxford University 1992, pages 237–240. First printed in One people- one destiny: some explorations in Jewish affairs by Marcus Arkin, O. Burgess Publishers, 1989.
- Baron, Salo, Kahan, Arcadius; et al., Economic history of the Jews, Nachum Gross (Ed.), Schocken Books, 1975. Originally published as an article in Encyclopedia Judaica, 1972, vol 16, pp. 1266–1326.
- Birmingham, Stephen, "The rest of us": the rise of America's eastern European Jews, Syracuse University Press, 1999
- Botticini, Maristella, "A Tale of 'Benevolent' Governments: Private Credit Markets, Public Finance, and the Role of Jewish Lenders in Medieval and Renaissance Italy". The Journal of Economic History, vol 60, 2000, pp. 164–189
- Brown, Erica, Confronting Scandal: How Jews Can Respond When Jews Do Bad Things, Jewish Lights Publishing, 2010
- Cameron, Rondo E., et al., International banking, 1870-1914, Oxford University Press US, 1991
- Cassis, Youssef, "Finance, Elites, and the Rise of Modern Capitalism", in Finance and the making of the modern capitalist world, 1750-1931, Clara Eugenia N˙Òez, P. L. Cottrell (Eds.), Universidad de Sevilla, 1998
- Chapman, Peter, The Last of the Imperious Rich: Lehman Brothers, 1844-2008, Penguin, 2010
- Cohen, Naomi Wiener, Jacob H. Schiff: a study in American Jewish leadership, UPNE, 1999
- Dearborn Publishing Company, Jewish Influence in the Federal Reserve System, excerpts reprinted from the Dearborn Independent, Dearborn Publishing Company, 1921.
- Dimont, Max I., Jews, God, and History, 1962, (reprinted Penguin, 2004)
- Foxman, Abraham, Jews and Money: The Story of a Stereotype, Macmillan, 2010
- Gabler, Neal (1988). An Empire of Their Own: How the Jews Invented Hollywood. Crown. ISBN 0-385-26557-3.
- Goldberg, J. J., Jewish Power. Addison Wesley, 1996.
- Gurock, Jeffrey S., Central European Jews in America, 1840-1880: migration and advancement, Taylor & Francis, 1998
- Jackson, Kathy Merlock, Rituals and patterns in children's lives, Popular Press, 2005
- Korey, William, Russian antisemitism, Pamyat, and the demonology of Zionism, Psychology Press, 1995
- Krefetz, Gerald, Jews and money: the myths and the reality, Ticknor & Fields, 1982
- Kuznets, Simon, "Economic Structure and Life of the Jews", in The Jews, Louis Finkelstein (Ed.), 1960, vol II, pp. 1597–1666.
- Marx, Karl, On the Jewish Question, 1843.
- Kasindorf, Jeanie, "The Chutzpah Defense", New York Magazine 11 November 1991
- Levitas, Daniel, The terrorist next door: the militia movement and the radical right, Macmillan, 2002
- Mosse, Werner Eugen, Jews in the German Economy, Oxford: Clarenden Press, 1987.
- Mosse, Werner Eugen, The German-Jewish Economic Elite 1820-1935: A socio-economic profile, Oxford: Clarenden Press, 1989.
- Muller, Jerry, Capitalism and the Jews, Princeton University Press, 2010
- Nation of Islam, The Secret Relationship Between Blacks and Jews: How Jews Gained Control of the Black American Economy, Nation of Islam- Historical Research Department, 2010
- Nelson, Benjamin, The idea of usury, from tribal brotherhood to universal otherhood, Princeton University Press, 1949
- Neusner, Jacob, The Economics of the Mishnah, University of Chicago Press, 1990
- Norwood, Stephen Harlan, Encyclopedia of American Jewish History, ABC-CLIO, 2008
- Penslar, Derek Jonathan, Shylock's children: economics and Jewish identity in modern Europe, University of California Press, 2001
- Perry, Marvin, Antisemitism: myth and hate from antiquity to the present, Palgrave Macmillan, 2002 (chapter 4: "Homo Judaicus Economicus: the Jew as Shylock, Parasite, and Plutocrat").
- Pfeffer, Jacob, Distinguished Jews of America: a collection of biographical sketches of Jews who have made their mark in business, the professions, politics, science, etc, Distinguished Jews of America Pub. Co., 1917
- Reuveni, Gideon, (Ed.)The Economy in Jewish History: New Perspectives on the Interrelationship Between Ethnicity and Economic Life, Berghahn Books, 2010.
- Sachar, Howard Morley, A history of the Jews in the modern world, Random House, Inc., 2005
- Sanua, Marianne Rachel, Let us prove strong: the American Jewish Committee, 1945-2006, UPNE, 2007
- Shapiro, Edward, A Time for Healing: American Jewry Since World War II, JHU Press, 1995
- Sherman, A. J., "German-Jewish Bankers in World Politics: The Financing of the Russo-Japanese War", Leo Baeck Institute Yearbook (1983) 28 (1): 59-73
- Slater, Robert The Titans of Takeover, Beard Books, 1999
- Todeschini, Giacomo, "Franciscan Economics and Jews", in Friars and Jews in the Middle Ages and Renaissance, Volume 2, Myers, Susan E. and McMichael, Steven J. (Eds), BRILL, 2004.
- Sombart, Werner, Die Juden und das Wirtschaftsleben, Duncker, 1911. Translated into English by M. Epstein: The Jews and Modern Capitalism, E.P. Dutton, 1913. English translation online here, and here, and version. (page numbers cited refer to the 1913 English translation)
- Steward, James B., Den of Thieves, Simon and Schuster, 1992
- Stone, Amy, Jewish Americans, Gareth Stevens, 2006
- Supple, Barry E., "A Business Elite: German-Jewish Financiers in Nineteenth-Century New York", The Business History Review, Vol. 31, No. 2 (Summer, 1957), pp. 143–178
- Valdman, Edouard, Jews and money: towards a metaphysics of money, Schreiber, 2000
- Iranian President Ahmadinejad's 2008 UN Address
