= Gordon J. Laing Award =

The Gordon J. Laing Award is conferred annually, by the University of Chicago's Board of University Publications, on the faculty author, editor, or translator whose book has brought the greatest distinction to the list of the University of Chicago Press. The first award was given in 1963 and the most recent award was given on April 8, 2026, to Sarah Newman, Associate Professor of Anthropology and Social Sciences in the College and Director of Undergraduate Studies at the University of Chicago.

The award is named in honor of Gordon Jennings Laing, the scholar who, serving as general editor of the Press from 1909 until 1940, firmly established the character and reputation of the Press as the premier academic publisher in the United States.

The award is presented each spring at a ceremony at the David Rubinstein Forum at the University of Chicago.

== Recipients of the Gordon J. Laing Award ==
- 2026 Sarah Newman - Unmaking Waste: New Histories of Old Things
- 2025 Jenny Trinitapoli - An Epidemic of Uncertainty: Navigating HIV and Young Adulthood in Malawi
- 2024 Margareta Ingrid Christian - Objects in Air: Artworks and Their Outside around 1900
- 2023 Elisabeth S. Clemens - Civic Gifts: Voluntarism and the Making of the American Nation-State
- 2022 Lisa Wedeen - Authoritarian Apprehensions: Ideology, Judgment, and Mourning in Syria
- 2021 Michael Rossi - The Republic of Color: Science, Perception, and the Making of Modern America
- 2020 Eve Ewing - Ghosts in the Schoolyard: Racism and School Closings on Chicago's South Side
- 2019 Deborah L. Nelson - Tough Enough: Arbus, Arendt, Didion, McCarthy, Sontag, Weil
- 2018 Forrest Stuart - Down, Out, & Under Arrest: Policing and Everyday Life in Skid Row
- 2017 David Nirenberg - Neighboring Faiths: Christianity, Islam and Judaism in the Middle Ages and Today
- 2016 Amir Sufi and Atif Mian - House of Debt: How They (and You) Caused the Great Recession, and How We Can Prevent It From Happening Again
- 2015 Mauricio Tenorio-Trillo - I Speak of the City: Mexico City at the Turn of the Twentieth Century
- 2014 Alison Winter - Memory: Fragments of a Modern History
- 2013 Andreas Glaeser - Political Epistemics: The Secret Police, The Opposition, and the End of East German Socialism
- 2012 Adrian Johns - Piracy: The Intellectual Property Wars from Gutenberg to Gates
- 2011 Robert J. Richards - The Tragic Sense of Life: Ernst Haeckel and the Struggle over Evolutionary Thought
- 2010 Martha Feldman - Opera and Sovereignty: Transforming Myths in Eighteenth-Century Italy
- 2009 Bernard Harcourt - Against Prediction: Profiling, Policing, and Punishing in an Actuarial Age
- 2008 Philip Gossett - Divas and Scholars: Performing Italian Opera
- 2006 W.J.T. Mitchell - What Do Pictures Want?: The Lives and Loves of Images
- 2005 Bill Brown (critical theory) - A Sense of Things: The Object Matter of American Literature
- 2004 Jonathan M. Hall - Hellenicity: Between Ethnicity and Culture
- 2003 Robert J. Richards - The Romantic Conception of Life: Science and Philosophy in the Age of Goethe
- 2002 Bruce Lincoln - Theorizing Myth: Narrative, Ideology, and Scholarship
- 2001 François Furet - The Passing of an Illusion: The idea of Communism in the Twentieth Century
- 2000 James Chandler - England in 1819: The Politics of Literary Culture and the Case of Romantic Historicism
- 1999 André LaCocque & Paul Ricoeur - Thinking Biblically: Exegetical and Hermeneutical Studies
- 1998 Martin E. Marty - Modern American Religion (in three volumes)
- 1997 Marshall Sahlins - How "Natives" Think: About Captain Cook, For Example
- 1996 W.J.T. Mitchell - Picture Theory: Essays on Verbal and Visual Representation
- 1995 Edward Laumann, Robert T. Michael, and Stuart Michaels - The Social Organization of Sexuality: Sexual Practices in the United States
- 1994 David McNeill - Hand and Mind: What Gestures Reveal About Thought
- 1993 Gerald N. Rosenberg - The Hollow Hope: Can Courts Bring About Social Change?
- 1992 Jean Comaroff and John L. Comaroff - On Revelation and Revolution, Volume 1: Christianity, Colonialism, and Consciousness in South Africa
- 1991 Leszek Kołakowski - Modernity on Endless Trial
- 1990 Richard G. Klein - The Human Career: Human Biological and Cultural Origins
- 1989 S. Chandrasekhar - Truth and Beauty
- 1988 David Grene - Herodotus: The History (translation)
- 1987 Philip B. Kurland and Ralph Lerner - The Founders' Constitution (in five volumes)
- 1986 Mircea Eliade - A History of Religious Ideas (in three volumes)
- 1985 Paul Ricoeur - Time and Narrative, Volume 1
- 1984 Richard Hellie - Slavery in Russia, 1450-1725
- 1983 Anthony C. Yu - The Journey to the West (in four volumes)
- 1982 James M. Gustafson - Ethics from a Theocentric Perspective, Volume 1: Theology and Ethics
- 1981 Wayne C. Booth - Critical Understanding: The Powers and Limits of Pluralism
- 1980 Morris Janowitz - The Last Half Century: Societal Change and Politics in America
- 1979 Alan Gewirth - Reason and Morality
- 1978 Sewall Wright - Evolution and the Genetics of Populations, Volume 3: Experimental Results and Evolutionary Deductions
- 1977 Marshall Sahlins - Culture and Practical Reason
- 1976 Keith Michael Baker - Condorcet: From Natural Philosophy to Social Mathematics
- 1975 Eric W. Cochrane - Florence in the Forgotten Centuries, 1527–1800: A History of Florence and the Florentines in the Age of the Grand Dukes
- 1974 Stuart M. Tave - Some Words of Jane Austen
- 1973 Edward Shils - The Intellectuals and the Powers
- 1972 Edward Wasiolek - The Notebooks of Dostoevsky (in five volumes)
- 1971 Herrlee G. Creel - The Origins of Statecraft in China, Volume 1: The Western Chou Empire
- 1970 Gerald D. Suttles - The Social Order of the Slum: Ethnicity and Territory in the Inner City
- 1969 Leonard B. Meyer - Music, the Arts, and Ideas: Patterns and Prediction in Twentieth-Century Culture
- 1968 Philip Foster - Education and Social Change in Ghana
- 1967 Donald F. Lach - Asia in the Making of Europe, Volume 1, Books 1 and 2
- 1966 A. Leo Oppenheim - Ancient Mesopotamia: Portrait of a Dead Civilization
- 1965 Tang Tsou - America’s Failure in China, 1941-1950
- 1964 William Hardy McNeill - The Rise of the West: A History of the Human Community
- 1963 Bernard Weinberg - A History of Literary Criticism in the Italian Renaissance
