= Richard Klein (paleoanthropologist) =

Paleoanthropologist

Richard G. Klein
- Born: April 11, 1941 (age 85); Chicago
- Education: University of Chicago; University of Michigan
- Known for: Study of human origins
- Awards: Member of the National Academy of Sciences, Member of the American Academy of Arts and Sciences, Gordon J. Laing Award
- Scientific career
- Fields: paleoanthropology
- Workplaces: Stanford University; University of Chicago; University of Washington, Seattle; Northwestern University in Evanston, Illinois; University of Wisconsin–Milwaukee

Richard G. Klein (born April 11, 1941) is a professor of Biology and Anthropology at Stanford University. He is the Anne T. and Robert M. Bass Professor in the School of Humanities and Sciences. He earned his PhD at the University of Chicago in 1966, and was elected to the National Academy of Sciences in April 2003. His research interests include paleoanthropology, Africa and Europe. His primary thesis is that modern humans evolved in East Africa, perhaps 100,000 years ago and, starting 50,000 years ago, began spreading throughout the non-African world, replacing archaic human populations over time. He is a critic of the idea that behavioral modernity arose gradually over the course of tens of thousands, hundreds of thousands of years or millions of years, instead supporting the view that modern behavior arose suddenly in the transition from the Middle Stone Age to the Later Stone Age around 50–40,000 years ago.

== Early life and education ==
Klein was born in 1941 in Chicago, and went to college at the University of Michigan, Ann Arbor. In 1962, he enrolled as a graduate student at the University of Chicago to study with the Neanderthal expert, Francis Clark Howell. Of the two theories in vogue then, that Neanderthals had evolved into the Cro-Magnons of Europe or that they had been replaced by the Cro-Magnons, Klein favored the replacement theory. Klein completed a master's degree in 1964, and then studied at the University of Bordeaux with François Bordes, who specialized in prehistory. There he visited the La Quina and La Ferrassie caves in southwest France, containing Cro-Magnon artifacts layered on top of Neanderthal ones. These visits influenced him into believing the shift from Neanderthal to modern humans 40,000 to 35,000 years ago was sudden rather than gradual. Klein also visited Russia to examine artifacts.

Klein briefly held positions at the University of Wisconsin–Milwaukee, Northwestern University in Evanston, Illinois, and the University of Washington, Seattle, before becoming a professor at the University of Chicago in 1973. Twenty years later, he moved to Stanford University.

== Works ==
- Man and culture in the late Pleistocene: A case study, Chandler Publishing, 1969. ASIN: B0006BYMZM (republished by ACLS Humanities as ebook with ISBN 978-1597405881)
- Ice-Age Hunters of the Ukraine, University of Chicago Press, 1973. ISBN 0-226-43945-3
- The Analysis of Animal Bones from Archaeological Sites, with Kathryn Cruz-Uribe, University of Chicago Press, 1984. ISBN 978-0-226-43958-7
- Quaternary extinctions: A prehistoric revolution, first editor Paul S. Martin, University of Arizona Press, 1989. ISBN 978-0816511006
- The Dawn of Human Culture, with Blake Edgar, John Wiley & Sons, 2002. ISBN 0-471-25252-2
- The Human Career: Human Biological and Cultural Origins, 3rd ed., University of Chicago Press, 2009. ISBN 978-0-226-43965-5

== Awards ==
- Member of the National Academy of Sciences
- Member of the American Academy of Arts and Sciences
- President, South African Archaeological Society (2002–2004)
- Gordon J. Laing Award

== See also ==
- Behavioral modernity
