= Cary Wolfe =

American academic

Cary Wolfe (born 1959) is an American academic. He teaches English at Rice University. He has written on topics from American poetry to bioethics. He has been a voice in debates on animal studies and advocates a version of the posthumanist position. He is series editor for Minnesota Press's Posthumanities Series. He was born and grew up in North Carolina.

== Early life ==
In 1984 Wolfe read interdisciplinary studies in English, philosophy, and comparative literature at University of North Carolina at Chapel Hill, where he received a B.A. with Highest Honors. He later received an M.A. from the Department of English there in 1986. He received his Ph.D. from the Department of English, at Duke University in 1990.

== Career ==
Wolfe's first teaching position was as an assistant professor at Indiana University, Bloomington, in 1990. He remained there until 1998, serving as associate professor of American studies. Wolfe moved to the State University of New York at Albany as a visiting professor. At Albany, he later served as director of graduate studies, associate chair, Department of English, 1998–1999, and was made a full professor in 1999. In 2003, he accepted an endowed professorship, the Bruce and Elizabeth Dunlevie post, at Rice University. Wolfe directs a center of critical and cultural theory at Rice, 3CT.

== Works ==
=== Books ===
- The Limits of American Literary Ideology in Pound and Emerson, Cambridge Studies in American Literature and Culture, no. 69 (Cambridge: Cambridge University Press, 1993).
- Critical Environments: Postmodern Theory and the Pragmatics of the "Outside," Theory Out of Bounds Series, no. 13 (Minneapolis: University of Minnesota Press, 1998).
- Animal Rites: American Culture, the Discourse of Species, and the Posthumanist Theory (Chicago: University of Chicago Press, 2003). Nominated for the James Russell Lowell Prize, Modern Language Association, 2004.
- What is Posthumanism? (Minneapolis: University of Minnesota Press, 2010)
- Before the Law: Humans and Other Animals in a Biopolitical Frame (Chicago: University of Chicago Press, 2012)
- Ecological Poetics, or Wallace Stevens’s Birds (Chicago: University of Chicago Press, 2020) Reviewed in the Electronic Book Review

=== Edited collections ===
- Rasch, William; Wolfe, Cary, eds. (1995). The Politics of Systems and Environments. Oxford University Press.
- Cary., Rasch, William. Wolfe (2000). Observing complexity systems theory and postmodernity. University of Minnesota Press. OCLC 748858770. (rpt. of the above in modified form with new introduction).
- Wolfe, Cary; Tabbi, Joseph, eds. (1997). "Critical Ecologies". Electronic Book Review. 4.
- The MSN issue: Music/Sound/Noise, special issue of EBR: Electronic Book Review, ed. with Joseph Tabbi and Mark Amerika. Online. World Wide Web: http://www.altx.com/ebr.
- Wolfe, Cary (2003). Zoontologies : the question of the animal. University of Minnesota Pr. ISBN 978-0-8166-4105-5. OCLC 712515349.
- Wolfe, Cary; Arsić, Branka, eds. (2010). The other Emerson. University of Minnesota Press. ISBN 978-0-8166-7487-9. OCLC 692336697.
