= Animality studies =

Emerging interdisciplinary academic field

Animality studies is an emerging interdisciplinary academic field focused on the cultural study of animals and animality. It can be distinguished from animal studies and critical animal studies by its resistance to animal rights or animal welfare as an explicit justification for work in this field. According to Michael Lundblad, "If animal studies can be seen as work that explores representations of animality and related discourses with an emphasis on advocacy for nonhuman animals, animality studies becomes work that emphasizes the history of animality in relation to human cultural studies, without an explicit call for nonhuman advocacy."

== See also ==
- Anthrozoology
