= Richard Hellie =

American historian (1937–2009)

- Born: May 8, 1937; Waterloo, Iowa, U.S.
- Died: April 24, 2009 (aged 71); Chicago, Illinois, U.S.
- Occupation: Historian
- Parent(s): Ole Hellie; Elizabeth Larsen

Academic background
- Education: Theodore Roosevelt High School; University of Chicago
- Thesis: Muscovite law and society: The Ulozhenie of 1649 as a reflection of the political and social development of Russia since the Sudebnik of 1589 (1965)

Academic work
- Institutions: University of Chicago (1966–2009)

Richard Hellie (May 8, 1937 – April 24, 2009) was an American historian.

Richard Hellie was born in Waterloo, Iowa, on May 8, 1937, to Ole Hellie and Elizabeth Larsen. His mother was a schoolteacher, and his father was a journalist. Ole worked successively for newspapers in Minnesota, Wisconsin, Missouri, Nebraska, and Iowa before joining the Des Moines Register in 1941, where he covered Nazi war crimes. Richard Hellie's interest in Russian history was sparked upon reading a children's book about Soviet partisans. He attended Theodore Roosevelt High School, where he played football. Following completion of the eleventh grade, Hellie enrolled at the University of Chicago, where he was a student of Arcadius Kahan. He completed a bachelor's degree in 1958, followed by a doctorate in 1965 (with one-year research spells at Harvard University in 1962–63 and Moscow State University in 1963–64), and taught at Rutgers University for one year after his graduation. He returned to Chicago in 1966, and was later appointed Thomas E. Donnelly Professor in History. While on the faculty of the University of Chicago, Hellie served as editor of the journal Russian History for two decades. He died of complications from esophageal cancer at home in Hyde Park, Chicago, on April 24, 2009, aged 71.

Four scrapbooks about Harry S. Truman that Hellie created at the age of sixteen are held by the Harry S. Truman Presidential Library and Museum.

== Works ==
- Enserfment and Military Change in Muscovy, Chicago: University of Chicago Press, 1971
- Slavery in Russia, 1450–1725, Chicago: University of Chicago Press, 1982
- The Muscovite Law Code (Ulozhenie) of 1649 (ed. and tr.), Irvine, CA: Charles Schlacks Jr., 1988
- The Economy and Material Culture of Russia, 1600–1725, Chicago: University of Chicago Press, 1999
