= Animal studies =

Cross-disciplinary study of animals

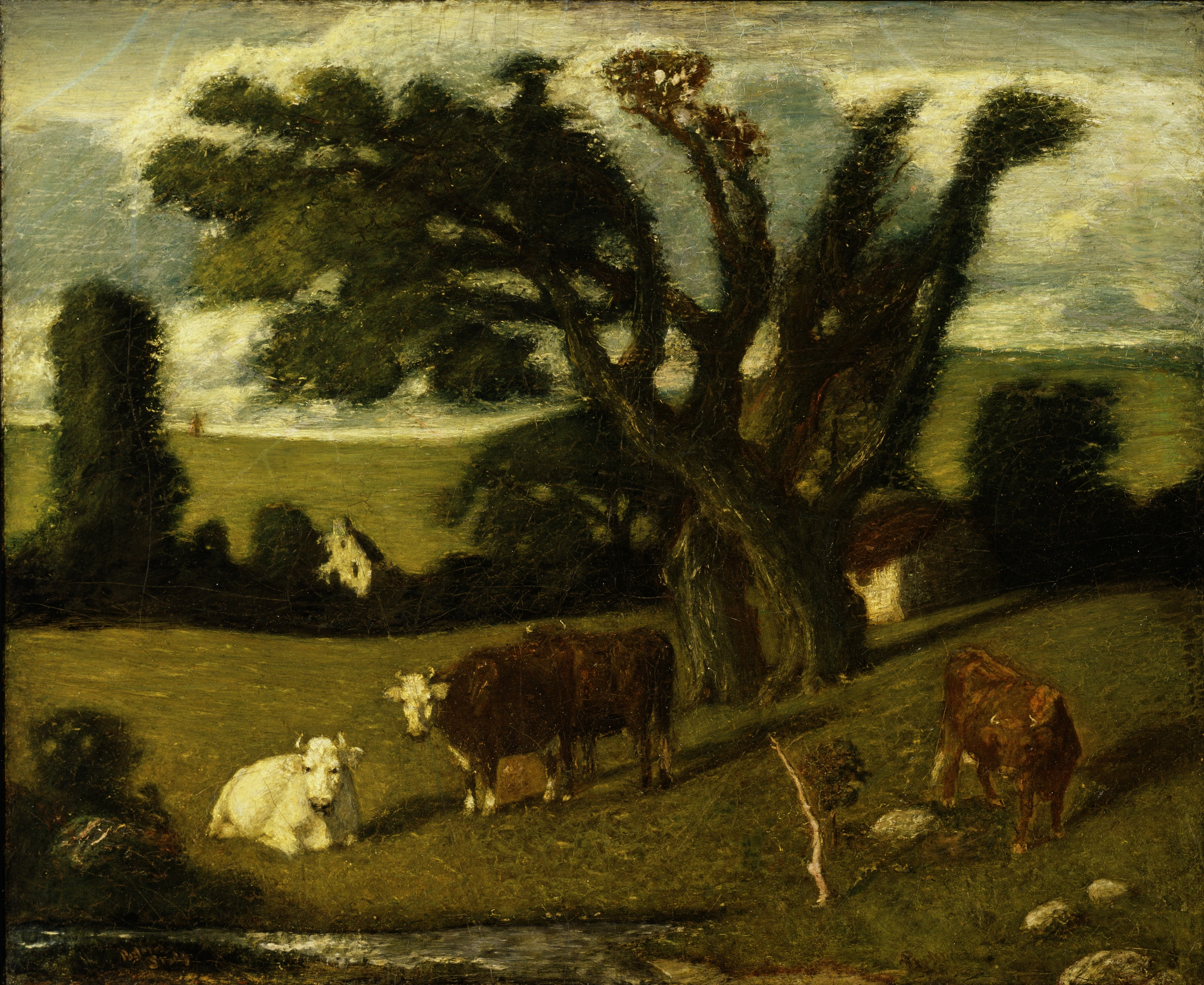
Painting titled "Pastoral Study" from the Smithsonian American Art Museum. Painting is by artist Albert Pinkham Ryder from 1897.

Animal studies is a recently recognised field in which animals are studied in a variety of cross-disciplinary ways. Scholars who engage in animal studies may be formally trained in a number of diverse fields, including art history, anthropology, biology, film studies, geography, history, psychology, literary studies, museology, philosophy, communication, and sociology. They engage with questions about notions of "animality," "animalization," or "becoming animal," to understand human-made representations of and cultural ideas about "the animal" and what it is to be human by employing various theoretical perspectives. Using these perspectives, those who engage in animal studies seek to understand both human-animal relations now and in the past as defined by present knowledge. Because the field is still developing, scholars and others have some freedom to define their own criteria about what issues may structure the field.

== History ==
Animal studies became popular in the 1970s as an interdisciplinary subject, animal studies exists at the intersection of a number of different fields of study such as journals and books series, etc. Different fields began to turn to animals as an important topic at different times and for various reasons, and these separate disciplinary histories shape how scholars approach animal studies. Historically, the field of environmental history has encouraged attention to animals.

== Ethics ==
Throughout Western history, humankind has put itself above the "nonhuman species." In part, animal studies developed out of the animal liberation movement and was grounded in ethical questions about co-existence with other species: whether it is moral to eat animals, to do scientific research on animals for human benefit, and so on. Take rats, for example, with a history of being used as "an experimental subject, feeder, and "pest." However, fewer than 10% of research studies on animals result in new medical findings for human patients. This has led researchers to find new Non-animal Approach Methodologies (NAMs) that provide more accurate human reactions. Animal studies scholars who explore the field from an ethical perspective frequently cite Australian philosopher Peter Singer's 1975 work, Animal Liberation, as a founding document in animal studies. Singer's work followed Jeremy Bentham's by trying to expand utilitarian questions about pleasure and pain beyond humans to other sentient creatures. Overall, progress happens slowly, but the marginal voices help introduce new concepts and ethics that can eventually transform society's relationship with other species.

Some still believe that the primary purpose of animal interaction is solely for food. However, animal domestication created a new intimate bond between human and non-human, and changed the way that humans live their lives. Theorists interested in the role of animals in literature, culture, and Continental philosophy also consider the late work of Jacques Derrida a driving force behind the rise of interest in animal studies in the humanities. Derrida's final lecture series, The Animal That Therefore I Am, examined how interactions with animal life affect human attempts to define humanity and the self through language. Taking up Derrida's deconstruction and extending it to other cultural territory, Cary Wolfe published Animal Rites in 2003 and critiqued earlier animal rights philosophers such as Peter Singer and Tom Regan. Wolfe's study points out an insidious humanism at play in their philosophies and others. Recently also the Italian philosopher Giorgio Agamben published a book on the question of the animal: The Open. Man and Animal.

== Art ==
Animals also played an essential role in the art community. One of the earliest forms of art was on the walls of caves from the early man, where they usually drew what they hunted. The country of Namibia has a large collection of ancient rock art from the Stone Age. The skillfully engraved depiction of animal tracks provides important information about the animals of that time. Then, in the Middle Ages, animals would appear for more religious reasons. Later in the 15th century, artists began coinciding with animals as a serious subject when discoveries in foreign lands were brought back to England. During the Renaissance era, the influential artist Leonardo da Vinci took interest in animal studies. Leonardo da Vinci studied animal anatomy to create anatomically accurate drawings of various species. Years later, animal representation took the form of woodworking, lithography, and photographs. In the late 1800s, photographers became interested in capturing animal locomotion.

== Research topics and methodologies ==
Researchers in animal studies examine the questions and issues that arise when traditional modes of humanistic and scientific inquiry begin to take animals seriously as subjects of thought and activity. Students of animal studies may examine how humanity is defined in relation to animals, or how representations of animals create understandings (and misunderstandings) of other species. In fact, animals often elicit fear in humans. A well-known animal phobia is ophidiophobia, the fear of snakes. People with animal phobias tend to negatively generalize animals, even species that are harmless.

In most movies, predatory animals such as sharks and wolves are usually the antagonists, but this only causes significant damage to their reputation and makes people fear what they think their true nature is. In order to do so, animal studies pays close attention to the ways that humans anthropomorphize animals, and asks how humans might avoid bias in observing other creatures. Anthropomorphized animals are frequently found in children's books and films. Researchers are analyzing the positive and negative effects of anthropomorphized animals on a child's view of the non-human species.

In addition, Donna Haraway's book, Primate Visions, examines how dioramas created for the American Museum of Natural History showed family groupings that conformed to the traditional human nuclear family, which misrepresented the animals' observed behavior in the wild. Critical approaches in animal studies have also considered representations of non-human animals in popular culture, including species diversity in animated films and fiction. By highlighting these issues, animal studies strives to re-examine traditional ethical, political, and epistemological categories in the context of a renewed attention to and respect for animal life. The assumption that focusing on animals might clarify human knowledge is neatly expressed in Claude Lévi-Strauss's famous dictum that animals are "good to think."

== See also ==
- Intersectionality
- Anthrozoology (human–animal studies)
- Animality studies
- Critical animal studies
- Ecocriticism
- Ecosophy

== Bibliography ==
- Bjorkdahl, Kristian, and Alex Parrish (2017) Rhetorical Animals: Boundaries of the Human in the Study of Persuasion. Lantham: Lexington Press. ISBM 9781498558457.
- Boehrer, Bruce, editor, A Cultural History of Animals in the Renaissance, Berg, 2009, ISBN 9781845203955.
- Boggs, Colleen Glenney (2013). Animalia Americana: Animal Representations and Biopolitical Subjectivity. New York: Columbia University Press. ISBN 978-0-231-16122-0.
- Burt, Jonathan, editor (2013), "Animal" series, Reaktion Books.
- De Ornellas, Kevin (2014). The Horse in early modern English Culture, Fairleigh Dickinson University Press, ISBN 978-1-61147-658-3.
- Derrida, Jacques (2008). The animal that therefore I am. New York: Fordham University Press. ISBN 978-0-8232-2791-4.
- Haraway, Donna J. (2008). When species meet. Minneapolis: University of Minnesota Press. ISBN 978-0-8166-5046-0.
- Kalof, Linda (2017). The Oxford Handbook of Animal Studies. Oxford: Oxford University Press. ISBN 9780199927142.
- Pick, Anat (2011). Creaturely Poetics: Animality and Vulnerability in Literature and Film. New York City: Columbia University Press. ISBN 978-0-231-14787-3.
- Ritvo, Harriet (2010). Noble cows and hybrid zebras: essays on animals and history. Charlottesville: University of Virginia Press. ISBN 978-0-8139-3060-2.
- Salisbury, Joyce E. (2010). The Beast Within. London: Routledge. ISBN 978-0-415-78095-7.
- Tuan, Yi-Fu (1984). Dominance and affection: the making of pets. New Haven: Yale Univ Press. ISBN 0-300-10208-9.
- Waldau, Paul (2013). Animal Studies: An Introduction. New York: Oxford University Press. ISBN 978-0-19-982701-5.
- Wolfe, Cary (2003). Zoontologies: the question of the animal. Minneapolis: University of Minnesota Press. ISBN 0-8166-4106-4.
