= Gordon Jennings Laing =

American classical scholar

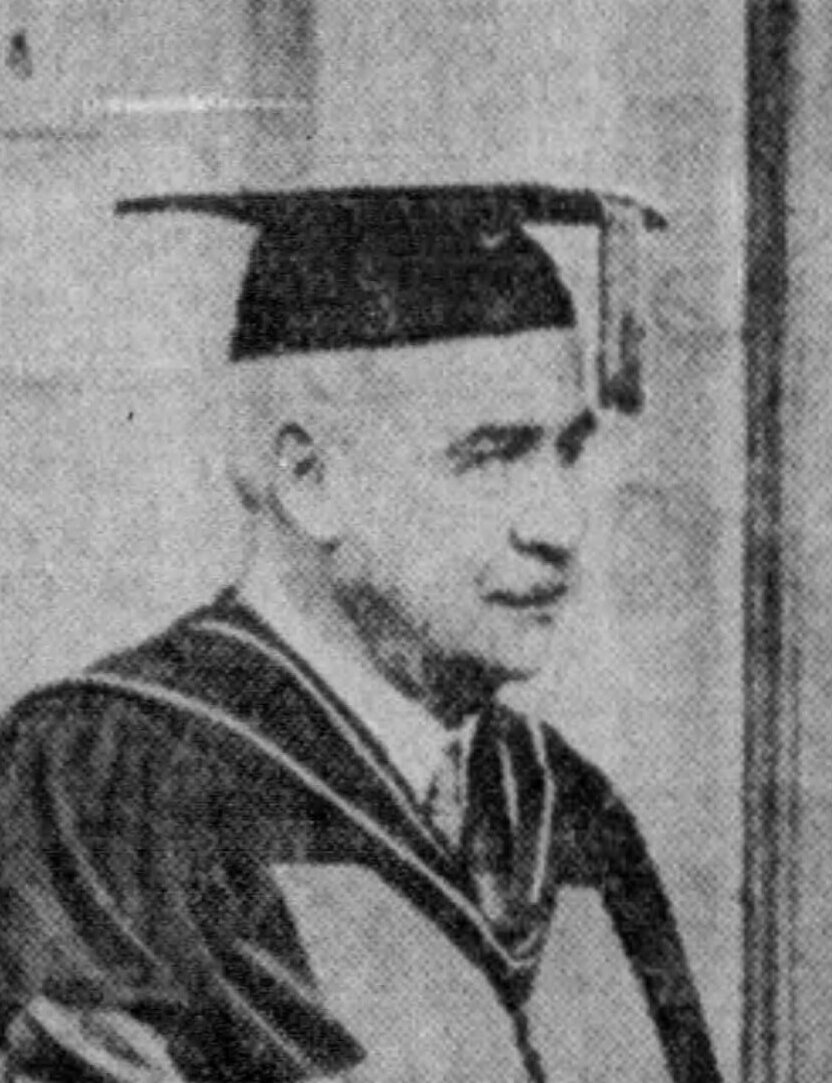
- Laing in 1930

Gordon Jennings Laing (October 16, 1869 – September 1, 1945) was an American classical scholar, born in London, Ontario, Canada. He graduated from the University of Toronto in 1891, taught Latin and Greek at Whetham College, Vancouver, British Columbia (1892-1893), and at the University of Toronto (1893-1895). He took the degree of Ph.D. at Johns Hopkins University in 1896, after which he taught and served at Bryn Mawr (1897–99), Chicago (1899-1921), McGill (1921–23), and Chicago (1923–35). He was managing editor of the Classical Journal from 1905 to 1908, associate editor of Classical Philology after 1905, and general editor of the University of Chicago Press after 1908. His publications include Masterpieces in Latin Literature (Boston, 1903), an edition of Selections from Ovid (New York, 1905), and an edition of the Phormio of Terence (Chicago, 1908), as well as Survivals of Roman Religion (1931). The Gordon J. Laing Award from the University of Chicago Press is named in his honor. In 1939, he was the commencement speaker at Washington University in St. Louis.
