= Alison Winter =

American academic

Alison Winter (19 November 1965 – 22 June 2016) was an American academic.

== Biography ==
Born on 19 November 1965 in New Haven, Connecticut, Winter spent her early childhood in Bonn, Germany, and attended high school in Ann Arbor, Michigan, where her father taught mathematics at the University of Michigan. His influence led her to study the history of science at the University of Chicago beginning in 1983. Winter moved to the United Kingdom for graduate study, where she met Adrian Johns in 1987. The two married in 1992. Winter completed her M. Phil at the University of Cambridge in 1991, followed by a PhD in 1993. She began teaching at the California Institute of Technology in 1994, and returned to Chicago as a faculty member in 2001.

Winter's doctoral dissertation was published by the University of Chicago Press as the book Mesmerized: Powers of Mind in Victorian Britain in 1998. The work covered the early history of animal magnetism and Franz Mesmer, as well as its spread throughout England from the 1830s to the 1870s, and focused on the work of John Elliotson. Research for Winter's second book Memory: Fragments of a Modern History was funded by the Guggenheim Fellowship, Andrew W. Mellon Foundation, and National Science Foundation. Memory was written in eleven chapters that can be read separately, as each chapter covers a different topic and several examples relating to memory. Alluding to its title, Memory sought to help readers "understand the broad historical developments precisely by bringing fragments of memory's history to life." Following its publication by the University of Chicago Press in 2012, Winter received the Gordon J. Laing Award in 2014.

Winter was diagnosed with glioblastoma in 2015, and died of a brain tumor on 22 June 2016, aged 50.
