= Robert J. Richards =

American historian (born 1942)

- Born: 1942 (age 83–84)
- Citizenship: United States
- Education: University of Chicago; University of Nebraska–Lincoln; St. Louis University
- Known for: History of Darwinian evolution
- Spouse: Barbara
- Scientific career
- Fields: History of science Philosophy of science
- Workplaces: University of Chicago
- Website: https://home.uchicago.edu/~rjr6/

Robert J. Richards (born 1942) is an author and the Morris Fishbein Distinguished Service Professor of the History of Science and Medicine at the University of Chicago. He has written or edited seven books about the history of science as well as dozens of articles.

In Nature is the Poetry of Mind, or How Schelling solved Goethe's Kantian Problems Richards describes Goethe's reception of Kant, his orientation on Spinoza, F. W. J. Schelling, and his contributions to evolutionary biology.

He has won several awards, including the Gordon J. Laing Award, the Quantrell Award for excellence in undergraduate teaching, the Pfizer Award, the George Sarton Medal from the History of Science Society and the Laing Prize from the University of Chicago Press and earned a Simon Guggenheim Memorial Fellowship. Richards earned two PhDs: one in the History of Science from the University of Chicago and another in Philosophy from St. Louis University.

== Books ==
- Cambridge Companion to the Origin of Species (edited with Michael Ruse) (Cambridge: Cambridge University Press, 2008). ISBN 978-0-521-87079-5
- Darwinian Heresies (edited with Abigail Lustig and Michael Ruse) (Cambridge: Cambridge University Press, 2004). ISBN 0521815169
- Darwin and the Emergence of Evolutionary Theories of Mind and Behavior (University of Chicago Press, 1987). ISBN 0226711994
- The Meaning of Evolution: The Morphological Construction and Ideological Reconstruction of Darwin's Theory (University of Chicago Press, 1992). ISBN 0226712028
- The Romantic Conception of Life: Science and Philosophy in the Age of Goethe (University of Chicago Press, 2002). ISBN 0226712109
- The Tragic Sense of Life: Ernst Haeckel and the Struggle over Evolutionary Thought (University of Chicago Press, 2008). ISBN 9780226712147
- Was Hitler a Darwinian? Disputed Questions in the History of Evolutionary Theory (University of Chicago Press, 2013)

== Articles ==
- Nature is the Poetry of Mind, or How Schelling solved Goethe's Kantian Problems (2006)
