= Deborah L. Nelson =

American academic (born 1962)

Deborah L. Nelson (born 14 December 1962) is an American academic.

Nelson earned her doctorate from the Graduate Center of the City University of New York and joined the University of Chicago faculty in 1996. She was appointed the Helen B. and Frank L. Sulzberger Professor of English in 2018. Her 2017 book, Tough Enough: Arbus, Arendt, Didion, McCarthy, Sontag, Weil won the 2018 James Russell Lowell Prize awarded by the Modern Language Association, and the 2019 Gordon J. Laing Award.

In 2023, Professor Deborah L. Nelson was appointed dean of the University of Chicago Division of the Arts & Humanities.

== Early life and education ==
Nelson graduated from Simsbury High School. She graduated from Yale College with a bachelor of arts in English in 1985. She graduated from Columbia University with a masters in English in 1990.

== Tenure as Dean of Arts & Humanities ==
In 2025, Nelson announced the re-naming of the expanded Division of the Arts & Humanities at the University of Chicago: “The re-naming of our division formally articulates the longstanding relationships among our scholars and artists, whose research and arts practice create life-changing examinations of who we have been, who we are, and who we might become—both individually and collectively.”

In an op-ed published in the Chicago Tribune, Nelson announced that she and more than 50 colleagues within the division were working to plan for the long-term vitality of the arts and humanities at the University of Chicago: "While U. of C. has produced many formidable figures in the arts and humanities over the last 133 years, we should remember that they changed ways of thinking only by refusing to accept the existing order of things. This is a time to take up that challenge again."
