= David Rosen (literary scholar) =

American literary scholar

- Awards: James Russell Lowell Prize (2013)

Academic background
- Education: Columbia University (BA); Yale University (PhD)

Academic work
- Discipline: Literary studies
- Institutions: Trinity College, Connecticut

David Rosen is an American literary scholar. He is a professor at Trinity College, Connecticut.

== Biography ==
Rosen received his BA from Columbia University, MA and PhD from Yale University. He was an instructor at Yale, and joined the faculty of Trinity College, Connecticut, in 2002. Rosen's scholarship has focused on poetry and the evolution of the concept of privacy.

Rosen won the James Russell Lowell Prize from the Modern Language Association in 2013 for co-authoring The Watchman in Pieces: Surveillance, Literature, and Liberal Personhood (2013) with Aaron Santesso. The book explores the way in which literature has shaped, and in turn been shaped by, surveillance and privacy practices since the Renaissance.
