= James Russell Lowell Prize =

The James Russell Lowell Prize is an annual prize given to an outstanding scholarly book by the Modern Language Association.

== Background ==
The prize is presented for a book that is an outstanding literary or linguistic study, a critical edition of an important work, or a critical biography.

== Eligibility ==
The Prize is open only to members of the Association.

== Notable winners ==
Past winners of the prize include:

2023 - Jonathan Sawday, Saint Louis University, for Blanks, Print, Space, and Void in English Renaissance Literature: An Archaeology of Absence

2022 - Matt Cohen, University of Nebraska–Lincoln, for The Silence of the Miskito Prince: How Cultural Dialogue Was Colonized

2021 - Kevin Quashie, Brown University, for Black Aliveness; or, a Poetics of Being

2020 - Peter Boxall, University of Sussex, for The Prosthetic Imagination: A History of the Novel as Artificial Life

2019 - Lynn Festa, Rutgers University-New Brunswick, for Fiction without Humanity: Person, Animal, Thing in Early Enlightenment Literature and Culture

2018 - Jonathan P. Eburne, Pennsylvania State University, for Outsider Theory: Intellectual Histories of Unorthodox Ideas

2017 - Deborah L. Nelson, University of Chicago, for Tough Enough: Arbus, Arendt, Didion, McCarthy, Sontag, Weil

2016 - Branka Arsić, Columbia University, for Bird Relics: Grief and Vitalism in Thoreau

2015 - Caroline Levine, Cornell University, for Forms: Whole, Rhythm, Hierarchy, Network

2014 - Anna Brickhouse, University of Virginia, for The Unsettlement of America: Translation, Interpretation, and the Story of Don Luis de Velasco, 1560–1945

2013 - David Rosen, Trinity College, and Aaron Santesso, Georgia Institute of Technology, for The Watchman in Pieces: Surveillance, Literature, and Liberal Personhood

2012 - Sianne Ngai, Stanford University, for Our Aesthetic Categories: Zany, Cute, Interesting

2011 - Simon Gikandi, Princeton University, for Slavery and the Culture of Taste (Princeton Univ. Press, 2011) Stephen Greenblatt, Harvard University, for The Swerve: How the World Became Modern (W. W. Norton, 2011)

2010 - Phillip H. Round, University of Iowa, for Removable Type: Histories of the Book in Indian Country, 1663–1880

2009 - Laura Dassow Walls, University of South Carolina, for The Passage to Cosmos: Alexander von Humboldt and the Shaping of America

2008 - Isobel Armstrong, University of London, for Victorian Glassworlds: Glass Culture and the Imagination 1830–1880

2007 - Laura Marcus, University of Edinburgh, for The Tenth Muse: Writing about Cinema in the Modernist Period

2006 - Martin Puchner, Columbia University, for Poetry of the Revolution: Marx, Manifestos, and the Avant-Gardes

2005 - Paula R. Backscheider, Auburn University, for Eighteenth-Century Women Poets and Their Poetry: Inventing Agency, Inventing Genre W. J. T. Mitchell, University of Chicago, for What Do Pictures Want?: The Lives and Loves of Images

2004 - Diana Fuss, Princeton University, for The Sense of an Interior: Four Writers and the Rooms That Shaped Them

2003 - Giancarlo Maiorino, Indiana University, Bloomington, for At the Margins of the Renaissance: Lazarillo de Tormes and the Picaresque Art of Survival

1982 - Thomas M. Greene, Yale University, for The Light in Troy: Imitation and Discovery in Renaissance Poetry

1979 - Barbara Kiefer Lewalski, Brown University, for Protestant Poetics and the Seventeenth-Century Religious Lyric

1972 - Theodore Ziolkowski Princeton University, for Fictional Transfigurations of Jesus
