= Branka Arsić =

University professor

- Awards: Guggenheim Fellowship (2019); James Russell Lowell Prize (2016); Ralph Waldo Emerson Society’s 2024 Distinguished Achievement Award

Academic background
- Education: University of Belgrade (PhD)

Academic work
- Discipline: American Literature
- Institutions: Central European University; University at Albany, SUNY; Columbia University

Branka Arsić is the Charles and Lynn Zhang Professor of English and Comparative Literature at Columbia University.

== Biography ==
Arsić was born in Serbia and received her PhD from the University of Belgrade. She taught at Central European University in Budapest and the State University of New York at Albany before joining the Columbia University faculty in 2012. She also taught at the Center for Women's Studies in Belgrade. Her scholarship specializes in the literature of the 19th century Americas and its scientific, philosophical and religious contexts. She was praised for "sharing insights that enable students to see canonical literature in a new light, helping them connect those works to contemporary issues and experiences."

Her book on Henry David Thoreau, Bird Relics: Grief and Vitalism in Thoreau, won the MLA's James Russell Lowell prize for the outstanding book of 2016. She was named a Great Immigrant by Carnegie Corporation of New York in 2018. She received a Guggenheim Fellowship in 2019 in the field of American literature.

Arsić was a visiting professor at Brown University. She is married to Brown professor David Wills.

== Publications ==
=== Books ===
- Ambient Life: Melville and the Ethereal Enlightenment, University of Minnesota Press (2026)
- Bird Relics: Grief and Vitalism in Thoreau, Harvard University Press (2016)
- On Leaving: A Reading in Emerson, Harvard University Press (2010)
- Passive Constitutions or 7 1/2 Times Bartleby, Stanford University Press (2007)
- The Passive Eye: Gaze and Subjectivity in Berkeley (via Beckett), Stanford University Press (2003)

=== Edited Collections ===
- Dispersion: Thoreau and Vegetal Thought, Bloomsbury Academic (2021)
- Melville’s Philosophies with K.L. Evans, Bloomsbury Academic (2017)
- American Impersonal: Essays with Sharon Cameron, Bloomsbury Academic (2014)
- The Other Emerson with Cary Wolfe, University of Minnesota Press (2007)
