= Thomas McLernon Greene =

Thomas McLernon Greene (May 17, 1926 – June 23, 2003) was an American scholar of English literature.

A native of Haddonfield, New Jersey, Greene was born on May 17, 1926. He completed his undergraduate degree at Yale University in 1949, after serving in the Counterintelligence Corps. from 1945 to 1947. Between 1949 and 1951, Greene attended the University of Paris. He became an instructor at Yale in 1954, a year before completing his doctorate in comparative literature, also at Yale. Greene was named a full professor in 1966 and appointed the Frederick Clifford Ford Professor of English and Comparative Literature in 1978, serving until retirement in 1996. He continued to research and write until his death on June 23, 2003, in New Haven, Connecticut. Yale held a public memorial service for Greene on September 5, 2003. His wife Liliane Massarano Greene died in 2010.

Greene has authored numerous books including The Light in Troy which won the Modern Language Association's James Russell Lowell Prize and the American Comparative Literature Association's Harry Levin Prize in 1982.
