= Aaron Santesso =

Canadian literary scholar (born 1972)

Aaron Santesso (born 14 September 1972) is a Canadian literary scholar and professor in the School of Literature, Media, and Communication at the Georgia Institute of Technology. His primary area of expertise lies in 17th and 18th-century literature, with published works cover a wide variety of topics within this broader category. Most notably, Santesso has published numerous works regarding surveillance in regards to literature and societal perceptions. His book, The Watchman in Pieces: Surveillance, Literature, and Liberal Personhood, which was cowritten with David Rosen, details the ways in which literature has shaped, and in turn been shaped by, surveillance and privacy practices since the Renaissance.

== Education ==
Santesso is a native of Trail, British Columbia, and received his bachelor's degree from the University of British Columbia. He then went on to receive his master's degree from Queen's University, and later his doctorate in English, with a specialization in 17th and 18th-century literature, from the same institution.

== Career ==
As a professor, Santesso currently works in the Georgia Institute of Technology's School of Literature, Media, and Communication. Previously, he taught at Wesleyan University and the University of Nevada. In his research and teaching, he focuses primarily on literary studies.

Santesso is the author and coeditor of several published books. His book The Watchman in Pieces: Surveillance, Literature, and Liberal Personhood, which was cowritten by David Rosen and awarded the James Russell Lowell Prize, details the relationship between surveillance and literature. In particular, it discusses how changes in observation strategies has impacted literature since the Renaissance. In this discussion, societal theories regarding surveillance and privacy are challenged. As Santesso and Rosen state, "the key challenges of contemporary surveillance...center on interpretation, empathy, and understanding the world as a tangle of competing narratives." Literature, they argue, is the mode through which this line of thinking may be achieved. Santesso has discussed surveillance and privacy in many of his other works, as well. In "School Surveillance and Privacy", a chapter form the book The Palgrave International Handbook of School Discipline, Surveillance, and Social Control, he examines the topic in relation to places of education. He has also discussed surveillance issues in relation to J.R.R. Tolkien, such as in the Slate article "The Eye of Sauron Is the Modern Surveillance State", cowritten with Rosen.

In addition to detailing issues of surveillance, Santesso has written many pieces regarding authors and themes presented in 17th and 18th-century literature. In his book A Careful Longing: The Poetics and Problems of Nostalgia, he discusses modern conceptions of nostalgia in relation to 18th-century poetry. He was also featured in Swift's Travels: 18th-Century Satire and its Legacy, a collection of Swift and other 18th-century satirical writers.

== Select works ==
- Santesso, Aaron and David Rosen. The Watchman in Pieces: Surveillance, Literature, and Liberal Personhood. Yale University Press, 2013.
- Santesso, Aaron. A Careful Longing: The Poetics and Problems of Nostalgia. University of Delaware Press, 2006.
