= Regulation through litigation =

Regulation through litigation refers to changes in society (particularly those that affect industries) brought about by litigation, rather than legislation or self-regulation.

Some laws have "private attorney general" provisions that permit individuals to file suit in court to vindicate important rights. Many laws for addressing consumer protection, civil rights and employment discrimination provide incentives for the private enforcement of laws by allowing the prevailing party to recover a reasonable attorney's fee.

Regulation through litigation may at times overlap with judicial activism.

== Criticism ==
Critics include members of industry and public-service professions; some argue that as potential defendants, their opposition is based more in self-interest than in policy concerns. Of particular concern is the use of the attorney general office to make policy, especially when that policy contradicts the policy of the chief executive. For example, many criticized Mississippi Attorney General Jim Hood for his litigation against insurance companies after Hurricane Katrina on the grounds that it undid the efforts of Governor Haley Barbour to improve the business environment in the state. In another example, eight state attorneys general unsuccessfully sued utility companies in an attempt to force implementation of global warming standards that the federal government had refused to adopt.

Some critics cite the constitutional doctrine of separation of powers, arguing that rules that govern society as a whole should be rooted solely in laws enacted by legislative bodies. By corollary, the judicial and executive branches should properly be limited in their powers with regard to the law: the judicial in interpreting the laws, and the executive in enforcing the laws.

There are sometimes legislative efforts to prevent regulation through litigation. Rick Boucher (D-VA) argued in support of a 2005 federal tort reform that gave immunity to gun manufacturers in lawsuits that were "nothing more than thinly veiled attempts to circumvent the legislative process and achieve gun control through litigation"; reform supporters complained (with the Pentagon's support) that the plaintiffs were trying to "sue [gun manufacturers] out of existence" through forcing them to incur $250 million in legal defense expenses, while gun control supporters argued that the legislation took away "the right of victims to be able to have their day in court", that the bill gave unprecedented immunity to a single industry, and that the law was unconstitutional.

== See also ==
- The Hollow Hope
- Tort reform
