= Gerald Krefetz =

American writer and financial developer

- Born: July 26, 1932; New York City, United States
- Died: January 27, 2006 (aged 73)
- Education: Columbia University
- Occupation: Author specializing in financial topics.
- Spouse: Ruth Marossi Krefetz
- Children: Adriene and Nadine

Gerald Krefetz (died 27 January 2006) was an American author specializing in financial topics.

== Personal life ==
He was married to Ruth Marossi Krefetz. Together the couple had two children, Adriene and Nadine.

== Career ==
Krefetz wrote on the economic status of Jewish communities in America and on antisemitism. In 1961, Krefetz was noted for calling attention to the lack of material about the Holocaust in American school textbooks.

== Books ==
- Money makes money: and the money money makes makes more money, 1970
- Jews and money: the myths and the reality, 1982
- The Parents Guide to Paying for College, 1999
- The Basics of Stocks, 2005
- The Basics of Speculating, 2005
- The Basics of Investing, 2005
- How to Read and Profit from Financial News, 1995
- Investing Abroad
- Leverage, 1986
- The Book of Incomes, 1982
- The Dying Dollar, 1972
- The Smart Investors Guide, 1982
