= Gerald N. Rosenberg =

American legal scholar

Gerald N. Rosenberg (born 1954) is an American political science and law professor at the University of Chicago, and the author of the 1991 book The Hollow Hope, now in its 3rd edition (2023).

== Education and career ==
A Phi Beta Kappa, Summa Cum Laude graduate of Dartmouth College, he holds an M.A. degree in Politics and Philosophy from Oxford University, a J.D. degree from the University of Michigan Law School and a Ph.D. in Political Science from Yale University. He is also a member of the Washington, D.C. bar.

Rosenberg spent the 2013–14 academic year as a visiting professor at the National Law School of India University in Bangalore, India. In the 2002–2003 academic year he was awarded a Fulbright Fellowship to teach U.S. Constitutional Law at the Law School of Xiamen University in Xiamen, Fujian, P.R. China. He has also served as a visiting fellow in the Law Program, Research School of Social Sciences, Australian National University, Canberra, Australia, 1995–1996.

He received the Quantrell Award.

== The Hollow Hope ==
The Hollow Hope challenges the belief that the U.S. Supreme Court is an agent of progressive social change. Rosenberg argues that the Supreme Court is structurally constrained from producing social change even when social change plaintiffs win their cases. Focusing on well known Supreme Court cases, particularly Brown v. Board of Education and Roe v. Wade, The Hollow Hope argues that they did not produce the significant social reforms that proponents claim for them.

The Hollow Hope was awarded the Gordon J. Laing Award from the University of Chicago Press in 1993 for a book published by a University of Chicago faculty member that brings the greatest distinction to the Press. It was also given the Wadsworth Award by the Law-Courts section of the American Political Science Association (for a publication ten years or older that has made a lasting contribution) in 2003. In addition, Rosenberg is a 1993 recipient of the Llewellyn John & Harriet Manchester Quantrell Award for Excellence in Undergraduate Teaching from the University of Chicago.

He is also the lead author of a video textbook on American Politics, American Government (with Mark Rom & Matthew Dickinson) (Thinkwell, Austin, Texas, 2001, revised edition, 2007), an edited collection of empirical studies of the Supreme Court of India, A Qualified Hope: The Indian Supreme Court and Progressive Social Change (edited with Sudhir Krishnaswamy and Shishir Bail), Cambridge University Press, 2019, 2022, as well as over forty articles and book chapters.
