= William Korey =

American lobbyist and academic

- Born: June 16, 1922; Chicago, Illinois, United States
- Died: August 26, 2009; Cambridge, Massachusetts, United States
- Education: University of Chicago; Columbia University
- Occupations: Lobbyist, academic
- Employer(s): B’nai B’rith, Anti-Defamation League
- Known for: Advocacy on Soviet Jewry, genocide convention ratification

William Korey (16 June 1922 – 26 August 2009) was an American lobbyist on international issues for B’nai B’rith. He was also a director of the Anti-Defamation League.

Korey wrote the influential book The Soviet Cage, one of a half-dozen books he published in the course of his career.

== Biography ==
Korey graduated from the University of Chicago. He served in the American Army during World War II. He attended the Russian institute at Columbia University, inspired by interactions with Russian soldiers. After attaining his doctorate, Corey taught for a number of years, including at the City College of New York.

In 1960, Korey became the first director of B’nai B’rith International’s United Nations Office, later also serving as the organisation’s international council chairman and heading its international policy research department. At the United Nations, he worked to counter efforts by member states that opposed Israel and sought to equate Zionism with racism, and he helped build coalitions with other American organisations accredited to the UN. In 1966, he was elected chairman of a coalition comprising 86 labour, civic, and religious organisations dedicated to promoting engagement with the United Nations.

As a lobbyist, Korey played a significant role in advancing the Jackson-Vanik amendment to the 1974 Trade Act, which linked U.S. trade relations with the Soviet Union to freedom of Jewish emigration. He was also a prominent defender of the Helsinki Accords, arguing that they provided mechanisms for influencing Soviet human rights practices. For several decades, Korey advocated for U.S. ratification of the Convention on the Prevention and Punishment of the Crime of Genocide, which was adopted by the United Nations in 1948. The United States ratified the convention in 1986, followed in 1988 by federal legislation criminalising genocide.
