= Adrian Johns (academic) =

British-born academic (born 1965)

Adrian Dominic Sinclair Johns (born 19 October 1965) is a British-born academic. He earned a doctorate from the University of Cambridge in 1992. He joined the University of Chicago faculty in 2001, and was appointed the Allan Grant Maclear Professor of History. He was awarded a Guggenheim fellowship in 2012.

Johns is best known for his works on the history of information, particularly The Nature of the Book: Print and Knowledge in the Making and Piracy: The Intellectual Property Wars from Gutenberg to Gates.

Johns met Alison Winter at Cambridge in 1987, and the two married in 1992. She died in 2016.

== Eisenstein-Johns Debate ==
In 2002, Johns was involved in a debate with Elizabeth Eisenstein in the American Historical Review over the degree to which printing was necessarily an agent of change (which Eisenstein had argued) or, as Johns claimed, a vehicle of change which carried messages that were mostly shaped by outside social forces.

== Selected bibliography ==
- Johns, Adrian. The Science of Reading: Information, Media, and Mind in Modern America. Chicago: University of Chicago Press, 2023. ISBN 9780226821481.
- Johns, Adrian. Death of a Pirate: British Radio and the Making of the Information Age. New York: W.W. Norton & Company, 2012. ISBN 0393341801.
- Johns, Adrian. Piracy: The Intellectual Property Wars from Gutenberg to Gates. Chicago: University of Chicago Press, 2010. ISBN 9780226401188.
- Johns, Adrian. The Nature of the Book: Print and Knowledge in the Making. Chicago: University of Chicago Press, 1998. ISBN 9780226401218.
