= Max Dimont =

Finnish-born American historian and author

Max Isaac Dimont
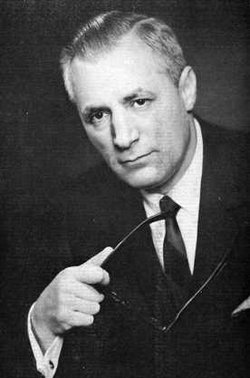
- Born: August 12, 1912; Helsinki, Grand Duchy of Finland, Russian Empire
- Died: March 25, 1992 (aged 79); St. Louis, Missouri, USA
- Occupations: Jewish historian Writer
- Spouse: Ethel
- Children: 2
- Writing career
- Years active: 1962-1992
- Genre: Non-fiction
- Subject: Jewish history
- Notable works: God, Jews, and History (1962)

Max Isaac Dimont (August 12, 1912 – March 25, 1992) was a Finnish American Jewish historian, lecturer, publicist, and writer.

== Early life ==
Dimont was born into a Jewish family on August 12, 1912, in Helsinki, Grand Duchy of Finland, Russian Empire, one of five children. Some sources claim he was born in Lithuania due to passenger lists on the ship on which they traveled.

Dimont finished high school in Finland, where he learned German. In 1929, he moved with his mother and four siblings to the United States to join his father, who had moved to Cleveland, Ohio in 1922. His father, Hyman Dimont, was a merchandise broker and Talmudic scholar, and returned to teaching Hebrew in his later years.

Dimont, who did not speak any English, taught himself the language by reading Shakespeare and the King James version of the Bible. He claims that he spoke "Elizabethan English" or "beautiful King James English" for his first few years in the United States. He finished four years of American high school in two years. He worked part-time at the Cleveland Public Library; his first full-time work was as a salesman at a Thom McAn store, then as a newspaperman.

== Career ==
Dimont served as a paratrooper and an interpreter officer for the United States Army Intelligence and Security Command during World War II. In 1939, he started working in public relations and human resources for the main office of the Edison Brothers Stores in St. Louis, Missouri. The Edison brothers did not mind his lack of college degree and saw merit in his past work with newspapers. In 1956, Hadassah Women's Zionist Organization of America asked him to do a lecture series on Jewish history; he cites this experience as responsible for getting him involved in history.

He published his first book, Jews, God and History in 1962 to overwhelming success. The Los Angeles Times praised the book as "unquestionably the best popular history of the Jews written in the English language." He and his wife Ethel visited Israel for the first time following the publication. Between 1962 and 1994, Jews, God and History sold over 1.5 million copies, was reprinted 17 times, and was translated into six languages. Dimont never made suffering the focus of his books unlike many other Jewish historians and instead exalted in the endurance of Jews. He was very interested in American Jewry, referring to it as "vigorous and healthy," "voluntary," and "something entirely new."

He published his second book, The Indestructible Jews: Is There a Manifest Destiny in Jewish History? in 1971 and his third, The Jews in America: The Roots, History, and Destiny of American Jews, in 1978. His literary success saw him traveling across the United States, Finland, Israel, Brazil, South Africa, and Canada giving lectures about Jewish history. In 1978, after 35 years there, he retired from the Edison Brothers to focus on being a scholar full-time. While there, he was the editor of the Edisonian, the company's publication. During his life, he also wrote for the St. Louis Post-Dispatch and the St. Louis Jewish Light. Amazing Adventures of the Jewish People and Appointment in Jerusalem: A Search for the Historical Jesus were published in 1984 and 1992, respectively. In 1977, he announced he was working on his first novel, Love and Loot, about G.I.s during World War II, but it was never published.

Prior to his death, Dimont was working on an updated version of Jews, God and History to include more recent events. He developed severe vision impairment and was nearly blind by the end of his life. His wife Ethel had always helped him write his books, oftentimes writing down what he dictated and listening to him read his reference books in their earlier years, and this book was no exception. Dimont died on March 25, 1992, after undergoing heart surgery. Ethel finished writing the Jews, God and History revision and published it herself in 1993.

== Personal life ==
Dimont spoke Finnish, Norwegian, Danish, Swedish, German, Yiddish, Hebrew, and English. He and his wife Ethel, a native of New York, married in 1946 and raised two daughters, Gail and Kaaren. He and Ethel lived in Clayton, Missouri, and attended Temple Israel. Ethel died in 2013.
