= The Hollow Hope =

Book by Gerald N. Rosenberg

- Author: Gerald Rosenberg
- Language: English
- Publisher: University of Chicago Press
- Publication date: 1991
- ISBN: 9780226312477

The Hollow Hope: Can Courts Bring About Social Change? was written by Gerald N. Rosenberg and published in 1991. A highly controversial work, it produced labels ranging from "revolutionary" to "insulting." A Second Edition of the book was published in 2008 by the University of Chicago Press (ISBN 9780226726717), followed by a 3rd edition in 2023 (ISBN 978-0226312477).

== Basic thesis and controversy ==
In his book, Gerald Rosenberg questions the validity of the commonly accepted axiom that the Supreme Court of the United States is able to effect widespread progressive social change. Naturally, such a drastic departure from conventional beliefs drew the ire of many critics, both within and beyond academia. Others praised the book. In 1993 it was awarded the Gordon J. Laing Prize by the University of Chicago Press (for a book written by a University of Chicago faculty member that brings the greatest distinction to the University of Chicago Press). In 2003 the American Political Science Association gave The Hollow Hope the Wadsworth Award (for a publication ten years or older that has made a lasting contribution).

== Dynamic Court and Constrained Court ==
Rosenberg examines two views of the United States Supreme Court: the view of the Dynamic Court and the view of the Constrained Court. The Dynamic Court view maintains that the United States Supreme Court is indeed capable of affecting widespread progressive change, often citing cases such as Brown v. Board and Roe v. Wade as examples. The Constrained Court view, on the other hand, holds that because of the existing constraints imposed upon the Court by the United States Constitution and the United States Congress, the Court is unable to accomplish significant change.

Rosenberg sides largely with the Constrained Court view. He studies several landmark cases that have been handed down from the Court, such as Brown v. Board of Education of Topeka (1954) and Roe v. Wade (1973), and asserts that in each examined situation, the Court was largely unable to attain any tangible, empirically-measurable change. Rosenberg names three constraints that preclude the US Supreme Court from being truly effective, and arrives at the conclusion that although the Court is indeed capable of accomplishing significant change, such change can only occur when these three constraints are overcome.

=== First Constraint ===
The First Constraint is that the nature of constitutional rights precludes the Court from hearing or effectively acting on many significant social reform claims and lessens the chances of popular mobilization. This Constraint can be overcome if there exists sufficient precedent for change based on the Judiciary's interpretation of the Constitution.

=== Second Constraint ===
The Second Constraint is that the Court does not have sufficient independence from the legislative and executive branches to affect significant social reform. This Constraint can be overcome by securing support from substantial numbers in Congress and securing the support of the executive branch.

=== Third Constraint ===
The Third Constraint is that the Court does not have the power to develop necessary policy and implement decisions that could affect significant reform. Because, as Alexander Hamilton put it, the Court controls neither the sword (Executive branch) nor the purse (Legislative branch), it must rely on cooperation from the other two branches in order to enforce its decisions. This Constraint can be overcome either by securing support of citizens or at least not having significant opposition from all citizens.

== Conditions for Judicial Efficacy ==
If the first and second constraints are overcome, Rosenberg hypothesizes that the third constraint, the Court's lack of power, can be overcome if at least one of four conditions is met. The first condition is that non-court actors offer incentives for implementation. Condition 2 highlights the imposition of costs by non-court actors for non-implementation. The third condition for judicial efficacy is the existence of a market that can implement the decision. The fourth condition hypothesizes that if there is both public and elite support, and support from administrators and those actors whose support is necessary for Court decisions to be implemented, then change can occur.

=== Empirical studies ===
In the third edition Rosenberg presents in-depth case studies of Supreme Court decisions requiring the end of racial segregation in schools and racial discrimination throughout society (Part 1), creating the right to abortion access and ending gender discrimination (Part 2), and striking down laws that discriminate against gays and lesbians with particular focus on marriage equality (Part 3). The book examines both direct effects (whether change occurred) and indirect effects such as changes in public opinion, political organizing, and legislative action. Rosenberg maintains that the efforts made by women's rights, pro-choice, and civil rights activists to use the courts to produce progressive social change have not been very effective. To support this claim, he examines a great deal of data. In looking at the effects that Brown v. Board had on desegregation, for example, Rosenberg looks at the percentage of black schoolchildren attending mixed schools in the South in the years preceding this landmark decision, and the years following it. He finds almost no measurable change in the ten years following this decision. Indeed, it is not until the Civil Rights Act of 1964 that the percentage begins to increase annually. In the 3rd edition he presents data showing that despite Brown schools are re-segregating. Similarly, in looking at Roe v. Wade, he finds that the annual number of legal abortions increased because there was demand for abortion access and public, business and political support for it (Condition 3). In the 3rd edition Rosenberg suggests that given this support for abortion access, the Dobbs decision reversing Roe is likely, in the long run, to make little difference in the number of legal abortions. In Part 3 on marriage equality Rosenberg finds that the Supreme Court followed public opinion and elite support. It was that support that allowed the Obergefell decision invalidating restrictions on marriage equality to be implemented.

== Criticism ==
There is a great deal of criticism leveled at The Hollow Hope. Some critics argue that the empirical data that Rosenberg presents is not fine-grained enough to identify subtle yet important changes. Others suggest that his constraints and conditions are imprecise, meaning that the argument lacks predictive power. Some critics claim that the Court is most effective when it engages in dialogue with other political actors such as when it interprets legislation, action that The Hollow Hope doesn't address. Finally, critics have alleged that progressives are more sophisticated in their approach to change than The Hollow Hope suggests, litigating only when judicial victory is likely to produce the change they desire.

== See also ==
- Judicial activism
- Regulation through litigation
