= Arcadius Kahan =

American historian

Arcadius Kahan (January 16, 1920 – 1982) was a 20th-century economic historian and Professor at the University of Chicago. Arcadius was author of Russian Economic History, The Nineteenth Century as well as The Plow the Hammer and the Knout The latter book presents his explanation of the foundation in the Eighteenth Century of the Russian economy and power structure.

Kahan had been a student in the Jewish Labor Bund when the Nazis invaded his country, Poland, in 1939. He joined an underground group which engaged in acts of sabotage and which struggled not to be caught, a group in which he became a leader. After the Soviet army pushed the Nazis out of Poland, he expected to help in forming a new government. Instead, the Soviets set up their own state within Poland. Kahan faced severe persecution that included a stay in a prison and reeducation facility used by the Soviets which was on the site of a wartime extermination camp. Kahan was forced to leave Eastern Europe.

After his arrival in the United States he earned a master's degree in 1954 and Ph.D. in 1958 in Economics from Rutgers University.

He joined the Economics faculty at the University of Chicago in 1955. As a member of the Economics Department at the University of Chicago, Kahan straddled a fine line between the principles which he brought from his socialist youth and the neoclassical school of economic thought associated with the department. He won the confidence of Milton Friedman with his work on the economic effects of the persecution of Jews in 19th century Russia. Kahan concluded that this had a significant impact on Russia's economic backwardness, particularly as compared with western Europe. He argued that this was an example of dysfunctional governmental interference in the economy, which drew on the methodology of the neoliberals in the Chicago school.

== Sources ==
- The Hammer, the Plow, and the Knout, Kahan, UC Press, Chicago 1985
- Essays in Jewish Social and Economic History, Kahan, UC Press, Chicago, 1986
