= Benjamin Tompson =

British-American poet (1642–1714)

- Born: 1642; Quincy, Massachusetts, British America
- Died: April 13, 1714 (aged 71–72)
- Burial place: Eliot Burying Ground
- Education: Harvard College (1662)
- Occupations: Author; educator; physician
- Known for: First known American-born poet
- Notable work: New Englands Crisis; poem, Harvardine Quils

Signature
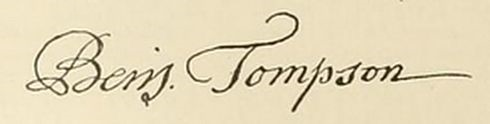

Benjamin Tompson (1642 – April 13, 1714) was an American Puritan poet, author, educator and physician from the Massachusetts Bay Colony, who is widely considered by historians as the "first native-born poet in America". He is also noted for his poems and writings involving King Philip's War and related conflicts between the colonies and Massachusett Indian Nations in 17th-century southern Massachusetts. In the aftermath of Indian attacks and the burning of entire towns and churches, Tompson saw this as an occasion to memorialize the tragic loses incurred in the conflicts through poetry and other writings in the hopes that it would also inspire other writers who were generally silent to take up the cause. His poem, Harvardine Quils, is the definitive example, directed at Harvard's scholars and other writers.

== Family background ==
Tompson was born on July 14, 1642, in what was then a part of Braintree. His parents were William Tompson and Abigail Tompson; Benjamin was the youngest of five children.

William was born in Lancashire county in 1596 or 1597; he likely attended the school in Winwick and knew Richard Mather who attended the same parish as he, and who had a great influence on William. William, a Puritan minister and the first pastor at Braintree, had emigrated from England in 1636. (Note: In the 1630s over ten thousand English scholars, soldiers, and statesmen emigrated to New England, led by John Winthrop and Richard Mather.) at a time when a "flood tide" of English migration to the colony was occurring. In May 1642, the Colony of Virginia was in need of ministers, where they sent some seventy letters to Boston in the hopes that they would heed their call and send any ministers that could be spared. The elders met and the letters were publicly read at a town meeting where it was agreed to send three ministers on the mission. William was one of the few ministers chosen, as he was one of several ministers who belonged to churches that had more than one minister. They set out in October from New York, but before they made it to the open sea they struck some rocks at Hell Gate and to prevent foundering they ran their ship ashore. While detained at New Amsterdam, they received "slender entertainment" and accommodations from the Dutch governor. It was mid-winter before they were able to secure another pinnace for their journey, where they departed from Narragansett Bay in October and safely arrived in Virginia. They were cordially received by the townspeople who welcomed their ministerial efforts. They were not, however, received in the same manner by the Virginia authorities because, as Puritans, Tompson and the other ministers would not conform to the dictates and precepts of the Church of England. Subsequently, they were ordered to return to Boston, as Puritanism was not tolerated by Governor Sir William Berkeley and his officers. Sometime in the summer of 1643, they arrived back in Boston.

Benjamin's mother died shortly after his birth and he subsequently was raised in the household of Thomas Blanchard, a neighbor. He attended Harvard College and graduated in 1662. In 1666 his father died. The next year Benjamin married Susanna Kirtland, with their marriage producing nine children. When he was fifty-one Susanna died in 1693. Subsequently, he was forced to take care of his children as a single parent. On December 13, 1698, he married Prudence Payson, a widow. Benjamin's older brother was Samuel Tompson, who was a Puritan Deacon.

== Vocations ==
Tompson taught at the Roxbury free school for three years, founded by Puritan missionary John Eliot, (Note: Eliot is credited for translating the Bible into the Massachusett Indian language, the first Bible printed in North America.) which eventually became the Roxbury Latin School. Among his students was Cotton Mather. Thereafter he returned to Braintree, presumably in 1704, remaining there until 1710. Throughout his adult life he practiced medicine as a physician and was also a disciplinary teacher. As an author and poet Tompson is credited for being the first American-born poet to emerge. He is noted for his writings and poems eulogizing the various conflicts between the colonists and the Indigenous peoples of Massachusetts. Because the work involved an epic issue in New England it became one of the best sellers in England, where works by American writers were welcomed. When Tompson was able to find time not involved with his teaching he pursued his writing aspirations and taught himself the art of writing poetic verse, and was motivated more by his own enthusiasm than from the influence of other writers.

After years of co-existence between the colonists and local Indigenous nations, Tompson was deeply moved by the conflicts and destruction that erupted during King Philips War in 1675–1676. In an effort to memorialize the loss of life Tompson took to poetry, which he also employed as a means to get other writers to join in the effort to bring attention to matters. Historian Peter White maintains that with the outbreak of the war, Tompson saw himself as "the public, representative voice" of threatened Massachusetts, and that he "decided to declare himself spokesman, apologist, critic, war correspondent."

Tompson's works include New Englands Crisis, his most publicized work, a series of poems involving the troubles of King Philip's War, which included his definitive poem, Harvardine Quils. (Note: "Harvardine Quils" is a reference to the pens of Harvard writers.) It was Tompson's appeal and a challenge to the writers of New England to join in the effort of memorializing the tragic losses. The first verse reads:

What meanes this silence of Harvardine quils
While Mars triumphant thunders on our hills.
Have pagan priests their Eloquence confin'd
To no mans use but the mysterious mind?
Have Pawaws charm'd that art which was so rife
To crouch to every Don that lost his life?
But now whole towns and Churches fire and dy
Without the pitty of an Elegy.
Nay rather should my quils were they all swords
Wear to the hilts in some lamenting words.
I dare not stile them poetry but truth
The dwindling products of my crazie youth
If these Essays shall rouze some quainter Pens
Twill to the Author make a rich amends. (Note: The entire poem can be read in White, 1980: Benjamin Tompson, Colonial Bard)

The rights to the publication were bought by Boston's John Foster, who printed them in 1676; they are regarded as "the first collection of American poems to be printed in what is the American colonies". Also in 1676, Tompson wrote and published New-Englands tears for her present miseries, printed in London, discussing the cause of conflicts between colonists and Indigenous peoples.

Not long after the death and funeral of John Winthrope, a Puritan and once governor of Massachusetts Bay Colony, Tompson wrote a Funeral Tribute in his honor, which appeared in New-Englands Tears. (Note: The text of the funeral tribute to Winthrope can be read in White, 1980, pp. 109–110.)

There are varying opinions among some historians as to who had the most inspirational influence on Tompson's authorship and his use of satire. Historian Moses Coit Tyler held the view that it was the English poet and social commentator, John Dryden, who bore the most influence on Tompson's work, and in particular his New Englands Tears. Two of Dryden's works make reference to Tears in regards to the English colonies. (Note: Dryden's titles: Fons Lachrymarum, or a Fountain of Tears; from whence flow England's Complaint (1677) and The Citizens Flight, with their Recall, to which is added Englands Tears and Englands Comforts (1665)) Historian Howard Judson Hall held the opinion that it was Tompson's teacher, John Quarles, who had the greatest influence. Historian Edwin Sill Fussell, however, maintains that the evidence to support either view conclusively, while compelling, is circumstantial, as both Dryden and Quarles made use of satire in their writings.

Primier Poems of Benjamin Tompson, 1676
Two title pages, 1 & 2

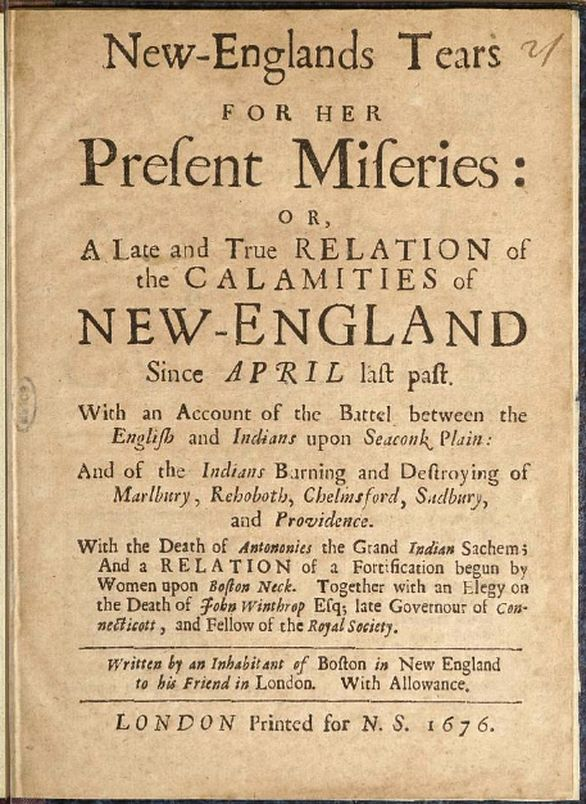
Tompson, 1676, New Englands Tears for Her Present Miseries

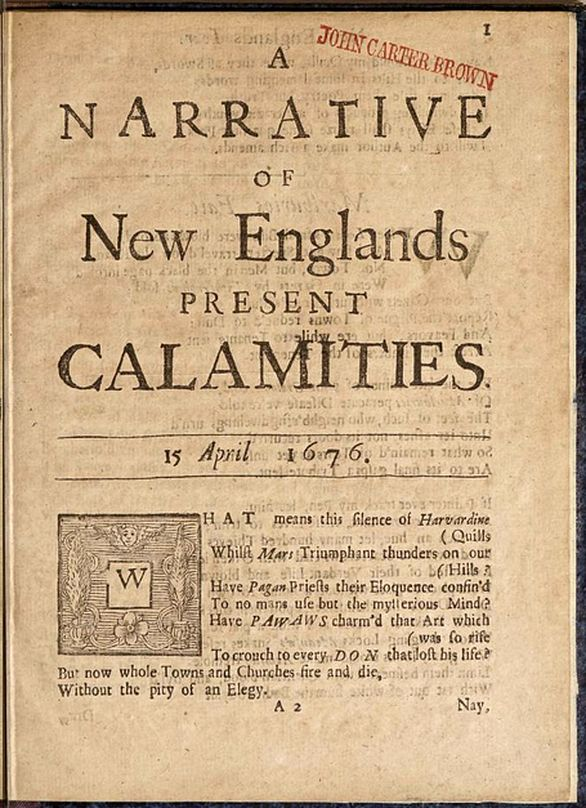
A Narrative of New Englands Present Calamities

On June 1, 1699, Gabriel Bernon (Note: Gabriel Bernon (1644–1736) was a French Huguenot and prominent merchant in La Rochelle, France, who fled religious persecution and arrived in Boston in 1688.) sold Tompson and wife Prudence his mansion with two and one-half acres in Roxbury for 110 pounds. On January 3, 1670, Tompson refused an offer to teach in Boston, as he had accepted a call to teach at Charleston, replacing Ezekiel Chevers, the former teacher. He taught there until November 1674. The years spent between 1674 and 1678 remain uncertain due to lack of any records, diary entries or letters. Beginning in 1700 Thompson once again was teaching at the Free School in Roxbury, remaining there for the next three years. In 1704 he returned to Braintree and taught at the local school there, while also serving as the town clerk.

Historian Howard Hall believed that Tompson remained in Braintree until 1710, when old age compelled him to return to Roxbury where he lived with his sons, Benjamin, a saddler, and Philip, also a physician. Historian Peter White, however, said it was more likely that after Tompson retired as town clerk he returned to Roxbury with Prudence, his second wife, and once again took up residence in the Bernon mansion, where he lived out the remaining years of his life.

== Final days and legacy ==
Tompson died at his home in Roxbury on April 13, 1714, at the age of 71–72. His tombstone at the Eliot Burying Ground is inscribed with the following inscription: "Learned schoolmaster and physician and the renowned poet of New England".

Tompson's writings are historically significant because they reveal a common example of poetic verse in New England during the late seventeenth century, and because of their subject content: "it concerns itself specifically for the most part with native material—Indian wars and Puritan divines, colonial fashions, attitudes, and standards". Conversely, in terms of literary style Tompson's work is considered adequate rather than exceptional.

== See also ==
- William Hubbard (clergyman) — New England clergyman and historian who wrote A Narrative of Troubles with the Indians (Boston, 1677)
- Samuel Green and Marmaduke Johnson, Boston printers of the first Bible to appear in North America
- Anne Bradstreet Poet and first writer in England's North American colonies to be published.
- List of early American publishers and printers

== Bibliography ==
- Baird, Charles Washington (1885). History of the Huguenot emigration to America. New York: Dodd, Mead & company.
- Eberwein, Jane Donahue (1993). ""Harvardine quil": Benjamin Tompson's Poems on King Philip's War". Early American Literature. 28 (1). University of North Carolina Press: 1–20. JSTOR 25056917.
- Flynn, Robin P. (ed.). Gabriel Bernon Papers. Rhode Island Historical Society, Manuscripts Division.
- Fussell, Edwin S. (December 1953). "Benjamin Tompson, Public Poet". The New England Quarterly. 26 (4). The New England Quarterly, Inc.: 494–511. doi:10.2307/362705. JSTOR 362705.
- Tompson, Benjamin (1924). Hall, Howard Judson (ed.). Benjamin Tompson, 1642-1714, First Native-born Poet of America: His Poems. Houghton Mifflin.
- Meserole, Harrison T. (1985). American poetry of the seventeenth century. Pennsylvania State University Press. ISBN 978-0-2710-0418-1.
- Murdock, Kenneth B. (1936). Malone, Dumas (ed.). Dictionary of American biography. Vol. XVIII. New York: Charles Scribner's Sons.
- Tompson, Benjamin (1894) [1676]. Foster, John (ed.). New England's crisis. Boston: The Club of Odd Volumes.
- Tompson, Benjamin (1676). New-Englands Tears for her present miseries.
- Tyler, Moses Coit (1880). A history of American literature. Vol. II. New York: G.P. Putnam.
- White, Peter (1980). Benjamin Tompson, colonial bard : a critical edition. Pennsylvania State University Press. ISBN 978-0-2710-0250-7.
- Winsor, Justin (1880). The memorial history of Boston : including Suffolk County, Massachusetts. 1630-1880. Vol. I. Boston: Ticknor.
- Winthrop, John (1972). The history of New England from 1630 to 1649. Vol. I & II. New York: Arno Press. ISBN 9780405033155.
- Wroth, Lawrence C. (1938). The Colonial Printer. Portland, Me.: The Southworth-Anthoensen press.
- "Benjamin Tompson Poems". My Poetic Side.
