= A Map of New England =

Historic map

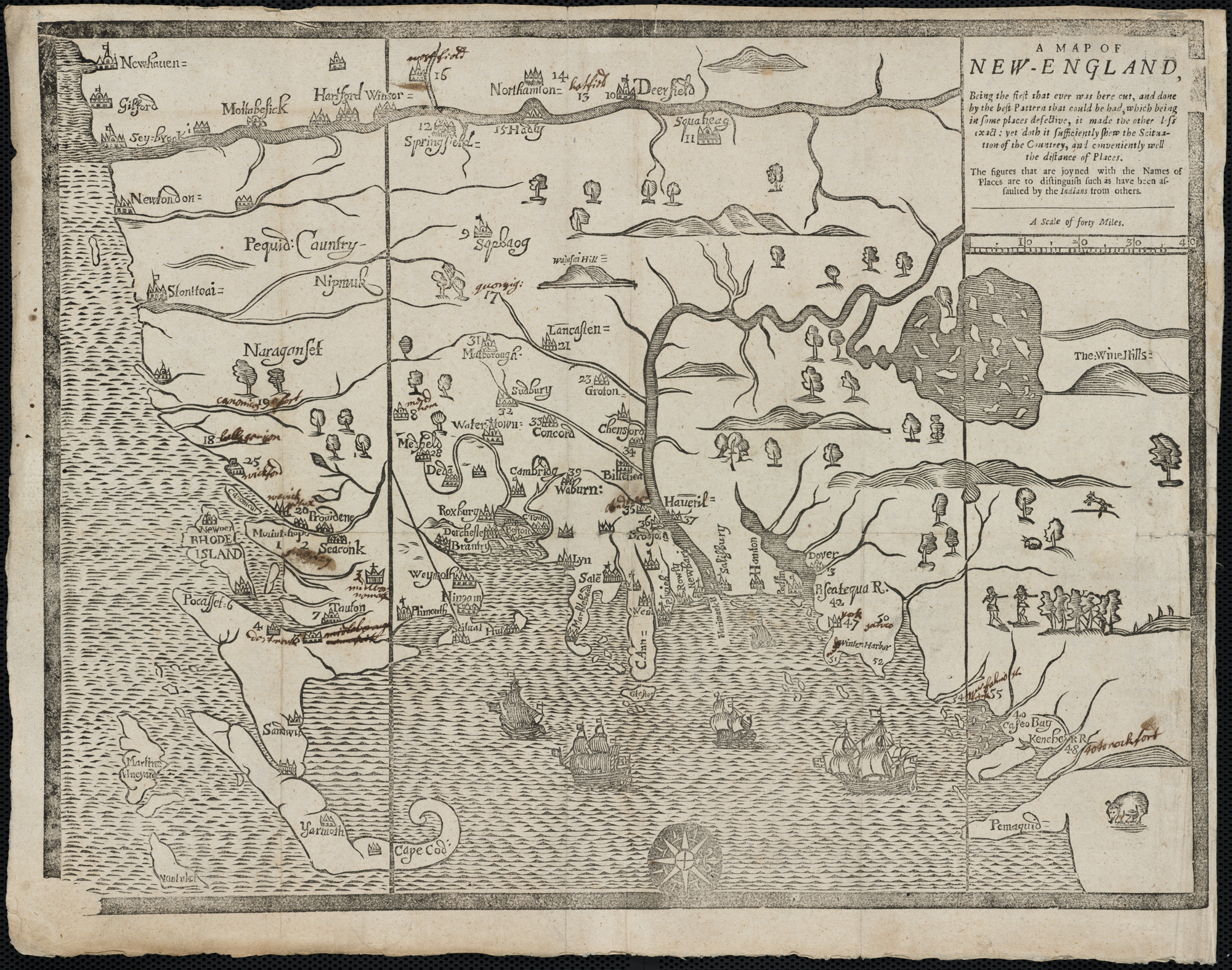
A Map of New England

A Map of New England, officially entitled A map of New-England, being the first that ever was here cut, and done by the best pattern that could be had, which being in some places defective, it made the other less exact: Yet doth it sufficiently show the situation of the country & conveniently well the distances of places, is an early regional map of New England, published in 1677. It was created by engraver John Foster, and first published as a visual guide to clergyman William Hubbard's 1677 publication A Narrative of the Troubles with Indians in New England, narrating his perspective of King Philip's War (1675–78). Originally printed and published in Boston, it is the first map known to have been published in the Western Hemisphere.

== Description ==
A woodblock print measuring 31 x 40 cm (12 x 16 in), depicted with a 1:900,000 scale, the map is the first domestically published map of New England, made 29 years after the first printing press arrived in the Massachusetts Bay Colony in 1638. Around that time, Foster was thought to be the only skilled woodblock engraver in Boston, as he set up shop in 1674.

The map is depicted in an unorthodox manner, with the west part of New England on the top of the page, extending as far west as New Haven, Connecticut and the northern regions (present day New Hampshire) extending to the right side.

=== History ===
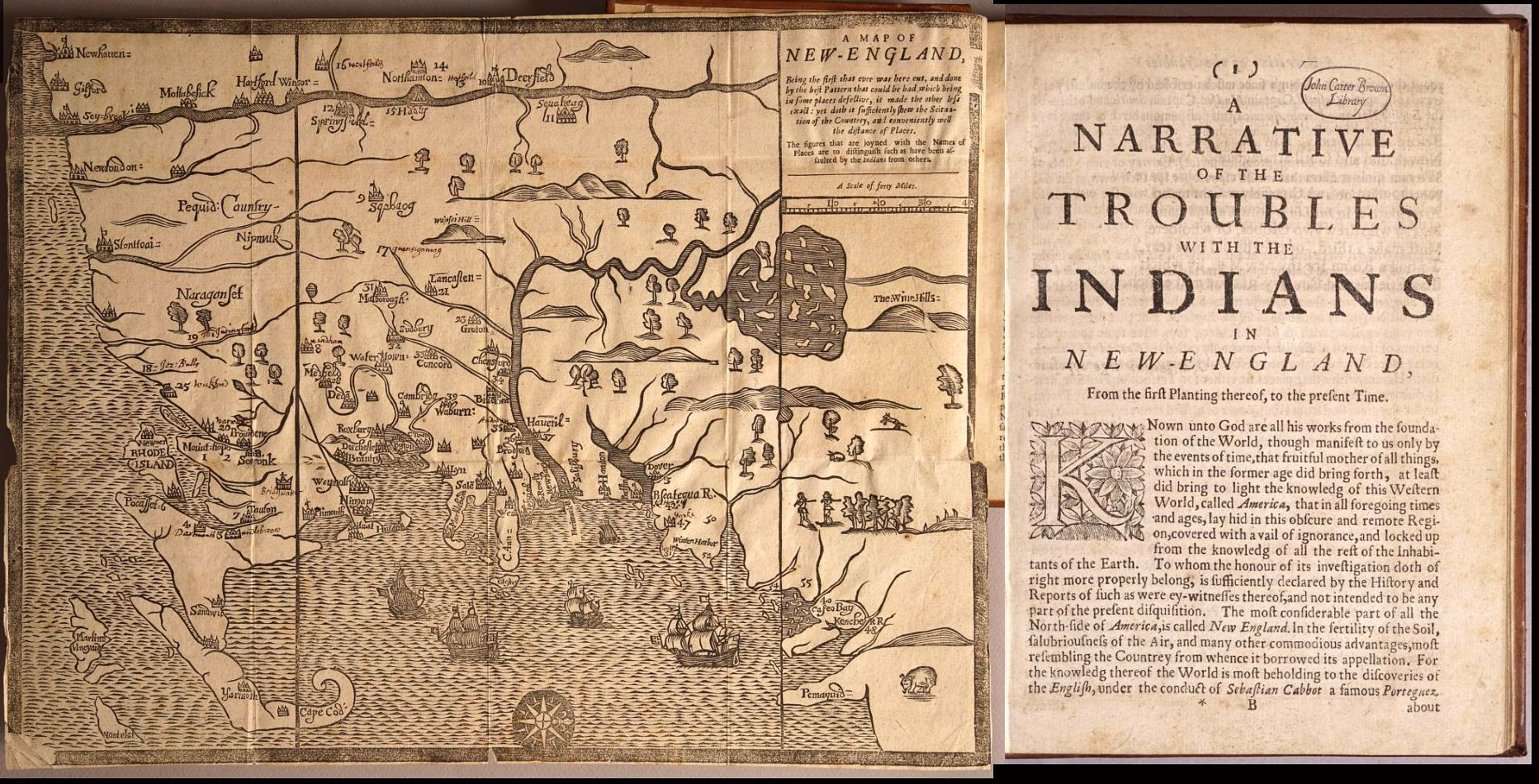
The map, side by side as a companion piece to William Hubbard's Narrative

The woodcut map was not made as a standalone atlas, but rather as a colonist history reference involving conflict with New England's tribal nations. The map was crafted to guide readers with a legend to William Hubbard's Narrative, which compiles the colonist perspective of King Philip's War (1675–1678), which was ongoing between the English colonists and the Wampanoag and Narragansett Nations in addition to a narrative on the Pequot War.

The map uses perpendicular lines to mark the North and South boundaries of the Massachusetts Bay Colony per the 1629 charter. Noted as to supplement Hubbard's narrative, the map is disproportional due to chronicling the incidents prior to and during King Philip's war. Connecticut is largely shrunken to the left of the page, while present day Greater Boston, Martha's Vineyard, and Colony of Rhode Island and Providence Plantations are shown in great detail, the hotspots of the conflict, with Cape Cod largely squished by the ratio of the map. Numbers dot the towns depicted, as Foster sought to mark incidents and battles prior to and during the war. Such examples include:

"40. Casco, a large Bay scatteringly inhabited and full of Islands, where Sept. 1675, Mr. Purchase his House was plundered. Sept. 9, following, Wakely's House and Family was spoiled. ..."

In addition, the territories of the Pequot Nation, and Nipmuc Nation are labeled on the map.

The map can be interpreted as a "biblical map" equivalent, as Hubbard sought to emulate his narrative as an Old Testament style chronicle, with New England as the equivalent of a "New Israel".

=== Variations ===
The map, along with Hubbard's Narrative was published the same year in London, retitled as The Present State of New-England. The original Boston version labels the White Mountains of New Hampshire as the "White Hills", while the London version labels them the "Wine Hills", along with additional spelling mistakes.

A variation of the Boston edition held by the Massachusetts Historical Society, also has an unnamed town marked in its version, which scholars and historians have been studying to determine the order of the map variants.

The Library of Congress owns a copy that was drawn in pen-and-ink.

== Legacy ==
The map, along with the Narratives, was popular in New England upon its release and for several years, and its aesthetic design is considered an iconic piece of 17th century Colonial media, and as such, it is often depicted on the covers of history books about the era.

With the inception of the Massachusetts Historical Society in the early 19th century, Hubbard and Forster's work saw a resurgence of popularity. In such instances, reproductions of Forster's map was recreated in 1826, by John and William Pendleton, the first lithographic printers of the United States.

In a reprint of Hubbard's narratives in 1865, editor Samuel G. Drake described the map as "the curious Woodcut Map."
