= Dorchester South Burying Ground =

Graveyard in Boston, Massachusetts

- U.S. National Register of Historic Places
- U.S. Historic district
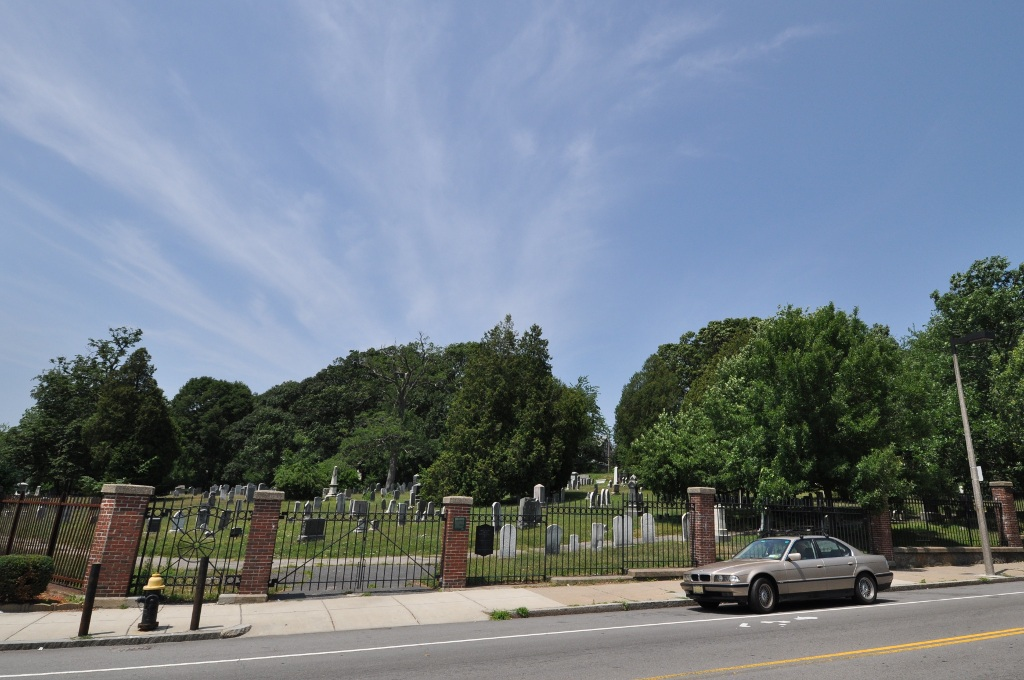
- Location: Dorchester, Boston, Massachusetts
- Coordinates: 42°16′43″N 71°4′1″W
- Area: 2 acres (0.81 ha)
- Built: 1814
- NRHP reference No.: 14000365
- Added to NRHP: June 27, 2014

The Dorchester South Burying Ground is a historic graveyard on Dorchester Avenue in the Dorchester neighborhood of Boston, Massachusetts. Established in 1814, it is the second oldest cemetery in Dorchester, after the North Burying Ground. It is a roughly 2-acre (0.81 ha) parcel on the west side of Dorchester Avenue, north of Dorchester Lower Mills. A paved roadway provides circulation around the perimeter of the property. There is some evidence that the cemetery was formally terraced, due to the sloping terrain, but there is no evidence of curbing that might have been used for this purpose. One of the cemetery's most prominent features is a line of granite tombs along the southern boundary.

The cemetery was listed on the National Register of Historic Places in 2014.

== See also ==
- List of cemeteries in Boston, Massachusetts
- National Register of Historic Places listings in southern Boston, Massachusetts
