= Irish Donation of 1676 =

The Irish Donation of 1676 is the name sometimes used to refer to a foreign aid consignment sent to the Massachusetts Bay Colony in 1676 from Ireland. A return donation 171 years later – from Massachusetts to Ireland – has been described as repayment for the original aid.

== Background ==
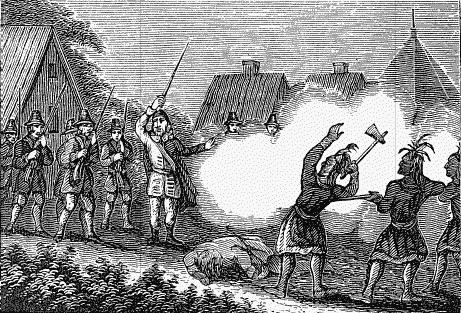
The Wampanoag Confederacy made early gains in the King Philip's War.

In 1675, the King Philip's War erupted between the Wampanoag Confederacy and their allies, on the one hand, and the United Colonies of New England and their Mohegan and Pequot allies on the other. The destructive conflict saw rapid Wampanoag gains and bloody losses by the United Colonies who were largely refused military assistance both by the Kingdom of England and by the neighboring Province of New York. By the spring of 1676 the frontier of Massachusetts had been overrun and lay "in shambles" with eleven towns – including Dartmouth and Springfield – entirely evacuated, and much of the population sheltered in a besieged Boston.

== The Donation ==
In 1676 Nathaniel Mather – a Lancashire-born, Harvard-educated, independent Protestant clergyman – was ministering in Dublin. Mather organized a fundraising drive among Dubliners to send foodstuffs and other goods to Massachusetts Bay Colony. The resulting donation was loaded onto the hired ship Katherine which sailed from Dublin, en route to Boston, on August 28, 1676.

Upon arrival, the consignment was to be given to a committee composed of William Tyng, James Oliver, and John Hull, "or as many of them as shall be alive". The committee was instructed to sell the goods to pay the shipping charges and distribute the remainder to colonists and members of colonial-allied Native American tribes who had been made refugees. Proceeds from the donation were ultimately divided among approximately 600 families.

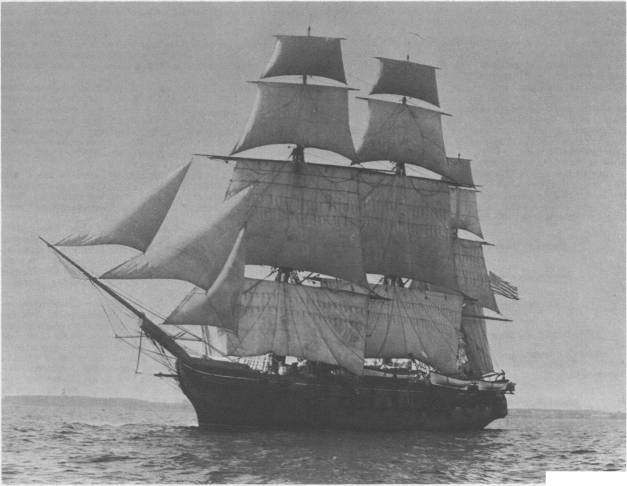
The United States sloop-of-war USS Jamestown (pictured) carried a return donation to Ireland in 1847.

== Massachusetts Donation of 1847 ==
In 1847, during the Great Famine, Massachusetts businessmen organized a fundraising drive for distressed Irish families which collected $150,000 in goods. The donation, transported to Ireland aboard the U.S. Navy sloop-of-war USS Jamestown was, according to Captain Robert Bennett Forbes, "for the payment of an old debt" – a reference to the Irish Donation of 1676.

A second planned donation shipment, to be collected from citizens of New York and transported aboard the U.S. Navy frigate USS Macedonian, saw less success; agitation by the ascendant, anti-Catholic Know Nothing movement had resulted in popular hostility to the idea of sending supplies to benefit the Irish. The shortfall in New York was made-up by additional provisions offered by Bostonians which ultimately enabled USS Macedonian to put to sea with a full cargo.

== See also ==
- Ireland–United States relations
