= John Foster (printer) =

American printer (1648–1681)

- Born: 1648; Dorchester, Massachusetts
- Died: September 9, 1681 (aged 32–33)
- Burial place: Dorchester North Burying Ground
- Education: Harvard College (Bachelor's degree, 1667)
- Occupations: Printer, engraver
- Notable work: First imprints of a map and portrait printed in America
- Parent(s): Hopestill and Mary (Bates) Foster

Signature
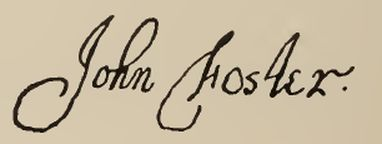

John Foster (1648 – September 9, 1681) was an early American woodcut printmaker and letterpress printer who operated a printing shop in Boston in the Massachusetts Bay Colony when the colony was still in its infancy. He is credited with printing the first image in British colonial America, from a woodcut (Note: Various historians refer to Foster's woodcut as a "wood engraving", or simply as an "engraving", and often refer to Foster simply as an "engraver".) he carved of the Puritan minister Richard Mather. He also printed the first map in the colonies, also from a woodcut that he carved. Foster graduated from Harvard University, but was a self-taught pioneer in American printmaking in woodcut, and also learned the art of typography from the Boston printer Marmaduke Johnson. He subsequently printed many works by prominent religious figures of the day in Massachusetts, and for a few years printed and published an annual almanac. His woodcuts were also used for the printing of official seals of the Massachusetts Bay Colony used by the provincial government.

== Early life ==
Foster was born in Dorchester, Massachusetts, which later became part of South Boston. He was the second son and fourth child of Hopestill and Mary (Bates) Foster. He was baptized in Dorchester on December 10, 1648, by the Puritan minister Richard Mather, who arrived in the British colonies in 1635. Foster's father was a brewer and a member of the Massachusetts General Court. Foster attended Harvard College and graduated in the class of 1667 with a bachelor's degree, some two years after he began teaching English, Latin, and writing in his hometown. His graduation class contained only seven students. After graduation he pursued a post-graduate course, but according to Harvard's records did not complete the course, as his name does not appear in their Quinquennial Catalogue. In October 1669, Foster replaced Rev. Hope Atherton, also a graduate of Harvard College as the teacher at the school in Dorchester, receiving a salary of £25 a year, later raised to £30 a year. He taught at Dorchester until late in 1674.

Investigations by Samuel Green, once the official printer in Cambridge, Massachusetts, reveals that Foster had possessed a natural talent for drawing and sketching, and early in life was drawn to the art of wood-engraving. After securing the necessary tools, he spent his leisure hours in learning the art. The crudeness of his work indicates that he was probably self-taught, although he may have been influenced by John Hull, the mint-master, and Edward Budd, a prominent carver who was in Boston as early as 1665.

== Printing career ==
Few details are known of Foster's career as a printer, which is often the case for mid-seventeenth-century printers. According to Foster's biographer, Samuel Abbott Green, it is difficult to write an extensive biography of his personal and professional life. Foster was the first printmaker to emerge in British colonial America and is considered to be a pioneer and innovator in this art. During Foster's time, the various crafts and trades were in their early development in colonial America and had not been specialized, as there was little time to devote to these things over the priorities of maintaining a comfortable life in the virgin frontier.

Foster "took up engraving as an avocation" (meaning printmaking) in 1671 and became the earliest printmaker in colonial America. After Richard Mather died, his son, Increase Mather, wrote a biography of Richard's life, printed and published by Samuel Green and Marmaduke Johnson in Cambridge in 1670, whose front piece bore an imprint from Foster's wood-cut of Mather. (Note: A similar image of Mather, a badly damaged oil painting, presumably painted by Foster, is held at the American Antiquarian Society, and it is possible that the woodcut was based on this painting.) It is considered the first printed image created in the American colonies. (Note: The rare print of Mather was in the possession of Sarah Catherine Mather (1840–1924) for many years before she discovered it tucked away at the bottom of her work basket. The print was passed down to her nephew Frank Jewett Mather, Jr. (1868–1953), a direct descendant of Richard Mather, and a former professor of art history at Princeton University. Frank died in 1953 and later Frank Mather's widow donated the print to the Princeton university library.)

A few years later, he purchased the printshop of Marmaduke Johnson from his widow which Johnson had established shortly before his death in 1674. Foster had learned the finer arts of typography and use of the printing press from Johnson. Like Johnson, Foster was also required to obtain a license to open and operate a printing office in Boston. Early the following year, Foster assumed control of Marmaduke's printing establishment and commenced printing operations "over against the Sign of the Dove," and became the premier and pioneering printer of Boston. Also that year, Foster began publishing an annual almanac which contained both science and the Zodiac with "An Almanack of Cœlestial Motions for the Year of the Christian Epocha", with year date noted in each yearly issue, with the first publication issued in 1675 and its last appearing in 1681, the year of Foster's early death. His almanacks contain a number of astrological and other imprints made from his woodcuts. (Note: Belief in Astrology did not conflict with Puritan religious beliefs and worship of God, as they regarded astrology as a way to further interpret God's workings.) Print historian Richard Holman explains that Foster's frustration with the bad quality of Cambridge printer Samuel Green on Foster's almanac during 1675 prompted him to give it a try as printer. Holman adds "perhaps Foster looked at the title page and decided that a bright Harvard man could certainly do better."

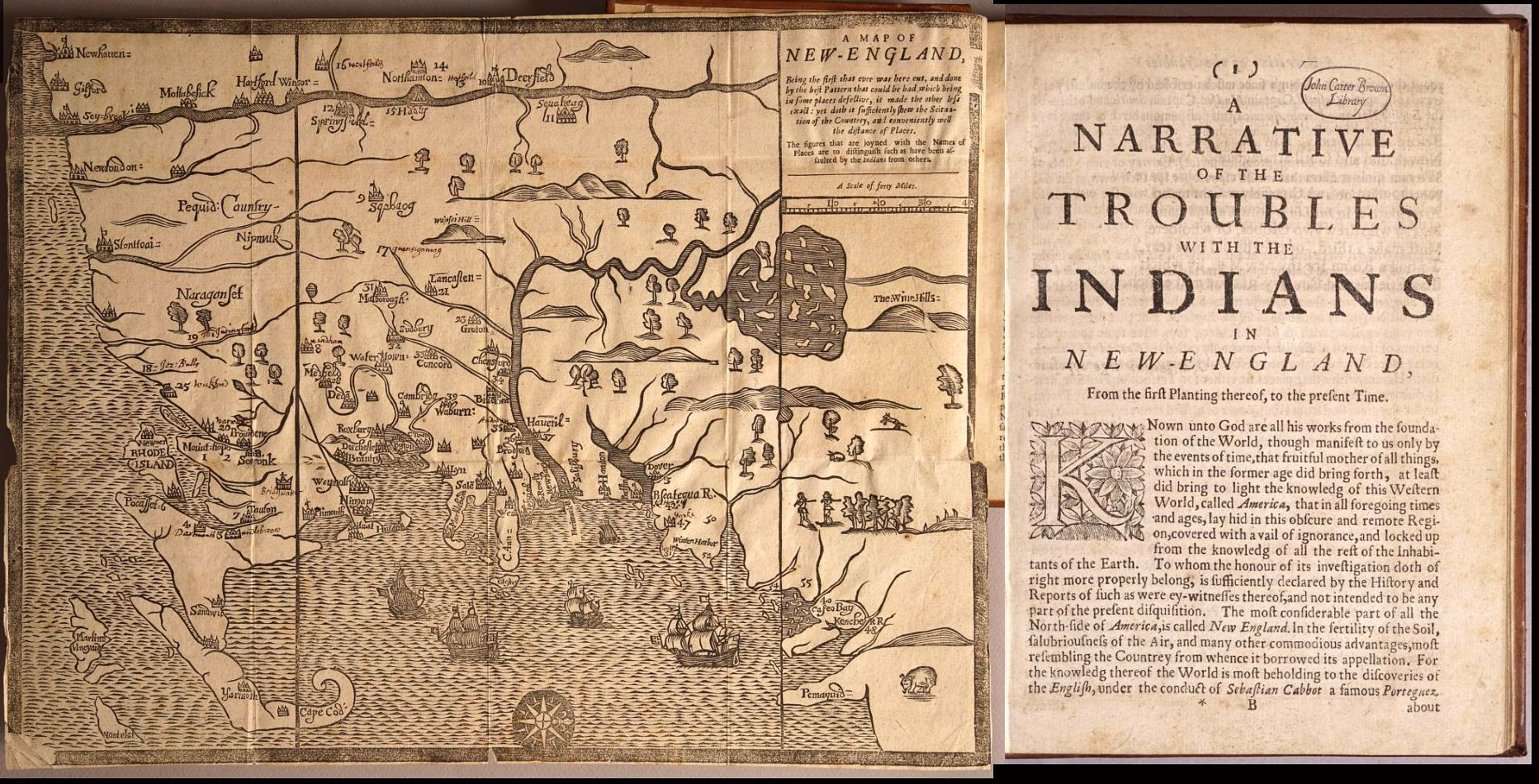
Foster's map of the Massachusetts Bay area, printed from a woodcut, one of two examples, referred to as the White Hills map, or spelled as Wine Hills (pictured), a derivative from the Indian word 'Winne'. (Top of the map faces west) See also: map with White Hills spelling

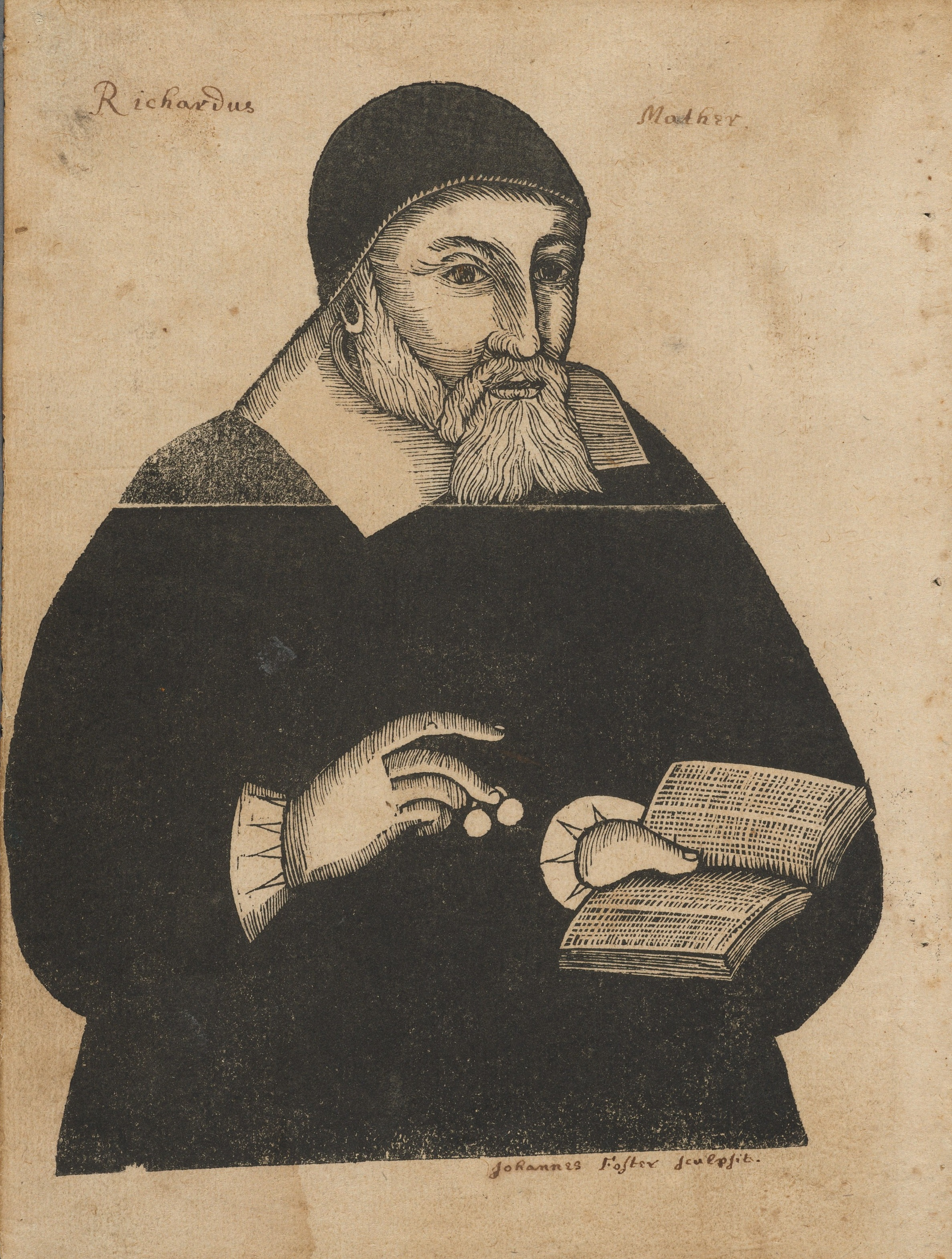
Foster's woodcut of Rev. Richard Mather, the first print made in British America (Note: Five known examples of Foster's print have survived, and are in the possession of the American Antiquarian Society, Harvard, Massachusetts Historical Society, Princeton, and University of Virginia.)

In 1672, Foster engraved on wood the Massachusetts Bay Colony seal, modeled after the original silver seal which was cut in England, and sent over to Governor Endicott in 1629. Foster's seals were used on official documents, and the colonial laws, including The General Laws and Liberties of the Massachusetts Colony, printed by Samuel Green. Evident in different editions of the laws, the engravings of this seal reveal variations, and suggest that Foster must have cut several separate seals. Foster's woodcuts were frequency used between 1675 and 1678, and appeared on various official documents until the Andros government of 1686. From 1678 on Foster's woodcut appears on many colonial documents indicating that nearly all the official printing contracts went to him after that date." An example of Foster's Massachusetts colonial seal also appears in Increase Mather's work, A brief history of the war with the Indians in New-England, published in 1676.

Aside from works by John Eliot, Foster also published A Narrative of the Troubles with the Indians in New England in 1677, by William Hubbard, Minister of Ipswich. The map contained (pictured in this section) was from an engraving of Foster's. He is credited with the first printed map produced in the American colonies, which appeared in Hubbard's 1677 work. He cut the woodblocks used to print the map of New England, known as the White Hills map. (Note: There are two printings of the map, one slightly smaller than the other, with a number of variations in the lettering, spellings and imagery.) Foster's map has puzzled and fascinated historians since the mid-nineteenth century because two versions exist, the other being produced in London, England. The map printed in Boston has the spelling of White Hills while the map printed in London spelled the term as Wine Hills for the same grouping of mountains. There are also differences in the lettering used and in some of the imagery. Which map came first and whether or not Foster carved both is a point of controversy, and raises the question as to whether it was Foster who actually carved the second woodcut used in London. David Woodward, a specialist in cartography maintains that the Wine Hills block was made in England, by another engraver using Foster's original proof for the model, and that the difference in the spellings were the result of this printmaker's inability to decipher some of the letters, as he would have glued Foster's original face down on the block to create the copy. His unfamiliarity with the various name is also a factor which contributed to differences in the spellings.

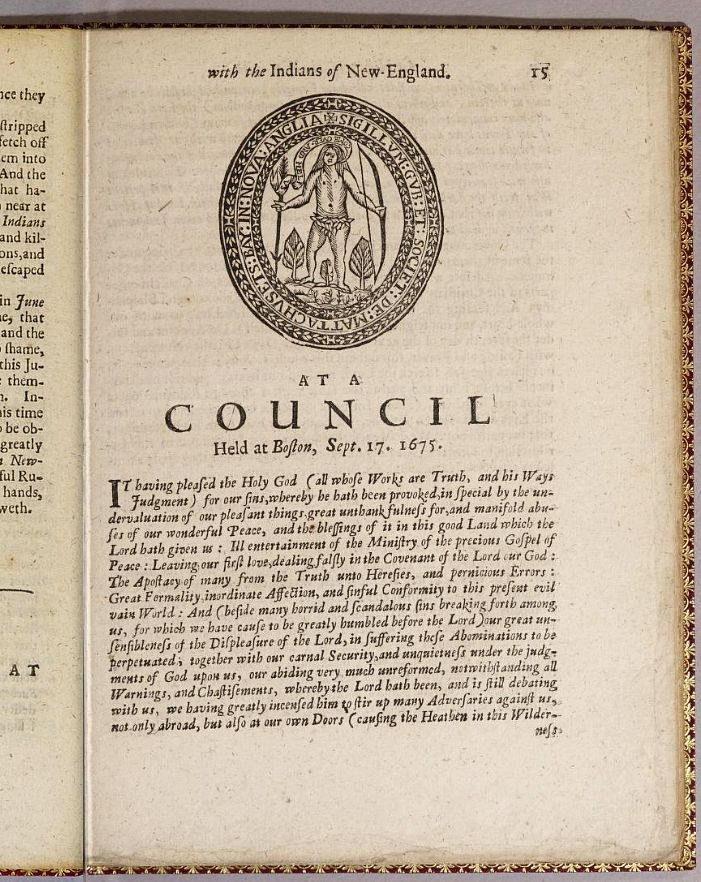
Example of Foster's woodcut in work by Increase Mather, 1676

Foster also printed works by Roger Williams, Thomas Thacher, Samuel Nowell, Eleazar Macher, Anne Bradstreet, William Adams, James Allen, and Samuel Willard, and several newspaper broadsides.

In 1678, he acquired a new font of type and subsequently produced his best work. He had no training in the printing trade but came to know its workings by observing Samuel Green at work in his shop in Cambridge where he printed the first Bible printed in the English language to appear in colonial America. (Note: The first bible printed in any language was the Eliot Indian Bible printed in 1661–1663.) Historian Matt B. Jones of the American Antiquarian Society explains that "enough has been said to make it clear that Green and Foster were not friendly rivals", which involved the competition between the two printers for printing commissions that often came from the Commissioners of the United Colonies who financed the Cambridge press, the Puritan Reverends Increase Mather and John Eliot, and others who ultimately gave Foster much of their work. Foster's printing career lasted from 1675 until just before his early death in 1681, which is largely why his extant works are very rare, consisting of some fifty editions.

Foster was provided with many printing commissions from Increase Mather (Note: Increase Mather, son of Richard Mather, was a New England Puritan clergyman in the Massachusetts Bay Colony and president of Harvard College for twenty years.) who provided him with a continuous flow of manuscript material; this enabled Foster to establish himself as a reputable printer in Boston. Foster also helped Mather distribute his writings across the New England colonies; such works outlined and detailed the providential history of New England.

In another American first, Foster bought out and printed a work by Benjamin Tompson, a renowned poet of New England, entitled New Englands Crisis, printed in Boston in 1676, consisting of a series of poems on events involved in the Indian wars. Print historian Lawrence Wroth notes that these poems are regarded as "the first collection of American poems to be printed in what is now the United States."

== Selected works printed by Foster ==
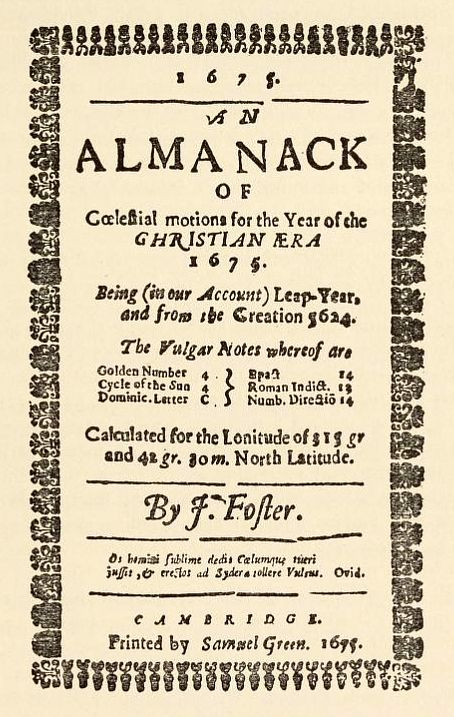
Almanack, printed and published by John Foster and Samuel Green, 1675

Along with his annual almanacs, Foster printed many religious works authored by various religious figures of his day, including Increase Mather, Leonard Hoar, Samuel Willard and others, some of which are listed below.

- The Times of Men are in the Hands of God. A Sermon occasioned by the blowing up of a Vessel with the crew, 1697
- George Fox Digged out of his Burrowes, or an offer of Disputation on 14 proposalls, made the last summer, 1672
- The wicked Man's Portion. Sermon at the Lecture in Boston, January 18, 1674, on the Execution of Two Men, 1674
- The Happiness of a People. Election Sermon at Boston, 1675
- A Narrative of the Troubles with the Indians in New England, from the first Planting thereof in the Year 1607, to the present Year 1677
- Relation of the Troubles which have happened in New-England by Reason of the Indians there, from the year 1614 to the year 1675
- An Earnest Exhortation to the Inhabitants of New England to hearken to the Voice of God
- Earnest Exhortation to the Inhabitants of New England.
- Harmony of the Gospels in the Holy History of the Humiliations and Sufferings of Jesus Christ, 1678.
- Several Poems compiled with great variety of Wit and Learning, full of Delight
- Confession of Faith owned and assented to by the Synod assembled at Boston in N. E. May 12, 1680
- The Duty of a People that have renewed their Covenant with God, 1680
- Platform of Church Discipline, &c, 1681
- Brief Animadversions on the Narrative of the New England Anabaptists, 1681
- Two Sermons on the Death of Lady Mildmay; dedicated by T. Flynt to Mrs. Bridget Usher, 1681

== Final days and legacy ==
After fighting tuberculosis for seven months, Foster died of tuberculosis in 1681 on September 9, 1681, at the relatively young age of thirty-three, leaving Boston without a printer. Samuel Sewall, though not a printer but a magistrate, a well respected man of Boston was recommended by the General Court to manage and continue printing operations where Foster left off. Foster is buried in the Dorchester North Burying Ground, not far from Richard Mather's grave.

In 1879 Boston historian John Allen Lewis said of Foster:

After a while I came to look on Foster as one of the great men of that great age, — a scholar, a thinker, a printer, engraver, chemist, — a man worthy of the love, friendship, and admiration of the Mathers. Had Foster lived to that age that Franklin reached, Franklin might have been called a 'second Foster.'

While Foster's body was "weak & languishing", while still of sound mind, he made out his last will and signed it on July 18, 1681. In it he had directed that his printing-press and wares at his shop in Boston be sold to pay off his debts, his funeral expenses, and to provide twenty or thirty shillings "to pay for a pair of handsome Gravestones." He bequeathed his house in Dorchester to his widowed mother, who was his sole executor. The value of his estate at the time of his death amounted to a little over a hundred pounds.

In Foster's will, he left the greater portion of his estate to his mother and his siblings, but set aside 20 shillings each (£1) for his good friends, the ministers John Eliot and Increase and Cotton Mather. Historians believe that Foster also worked as a medical doctor, which was not uncommon for a man of Foster's education at a time when there were few doctors in the early years of colonial America.

A portrait of Richard Mather by Foster was featured on a postage stamp in the U.S. Postal Service's 1998 "Four Centuries of American Art" series.

== See also ==
- List of early American publishers and printers
- Benjamin Tompson — First native born poet to emerge in colonial America

== Bibliography ==
- Barker, Virgil (1951). American Painting. The Macmillan Company.
- Green, Samuel Abbott (1909). John Foster : the earliest American engraver and the first Boston printer. Boston : Massachusetts Historical Society.
- Griffin, Gillett Good (1959). John Foster's Woodcut of Richard Mather. Stinehour Press.
  Page covering first American print
- Hamilton, Sinclair (1958). Early American book illustrators and wood engravers, 1670–1870. Princeton, N.J, Princeton university Library.
- —— (Summer 1963). "John Foster and the "White Hills" Map". The Princeton University Library Chronicle. 14 (4). Princeton University Library: 177–182. doi:10.2307/26402914. JSTOR 26402914.
- Hubbard, William (1865) [1677]. Drake, Samuel Gardner (ed.). The history of the Indian wars in New England : from the first settlement to the termination of the war with King Philip in 1677. Vol. I. Roxbury, Mass. : Printed for W.E. Woodward.
- Jones, Matt B. (1934). The Early Massachusetts-Bay Colony Seals (PDF). American Antiquarian Society.
- Littlefield, George Emery (1900). Early Boston Booksellers 1642–1711. The Club of odd volumes.
- —— (1907). The Early Massachusetts Press, 1638–1711. Vol. I. The Club of Odd Volumes.
- —— (1907). The Early Massachusetts Press, 1638–1711. Vol. II. The Club of Odd Volumes.
- Increase, Mather (1676). A brief history of the vvar with the Indians in New-England. London : printed for Richard Chiswell.
- Paltsits, Victor H. (1932). Malone, Dumas (ed.). Dictionary of American biography. Vol. VI. New York: Charles Scribner's Sons.
- Rex, Cathy (March 2011). "Indians and Images: The Massachusetts Bay Colony Seal, James Printer, and the Anxiety of Colonial Identity". American Quarterly. 63 (1). The Johns Hopkins University Press: 61–93. doi:10.1353/aq.2011.0001. JSTOR 41237532. S2CID 144137458.
- Roark, Elisabeth Louise (2003). Artists of Colonial America. Greenwood. ISBN 978-0-313-32023-1.
- Tompson, Benjamin (1894) [1676]. Foster, John (ed.). New England's crisis. Boston, The Club of Odd Volumes.
- Thomas, Isaiah (1874). The history of printing in America, with a biography of printers. Vol. I. New York: B. Franklin.
- —— (1874). The history of printing in America, with a biography of printers. Vol. II. New York, B. Franklin.
- Woodward, David (1967). "The Foster Woodcut Map Controversy: A Further Examination of the Evidence". Imago Mundi. 21. Imago Mundi, Ltd.: 50–61. doi:10.1080/03085696708592299. JSTOR 1150479.
- Wroth, Lawrence C. (1938). The Colonial Printer. Portland, Me., The Southworth-Anthoensen press.
- "32c American Art pane of twenty". Smithsonian National Postal Noseum.
- President and Fellows of Harvard College (2004). "Mather, Increase, 1639–1723. Papers of Increase Mather: an inventory". Harvard University. Archived from the original on September 2, 2006.
- "Checking the provenance of John Foster's 1670 woodcut". Princeton University Library. 2022.
- "The Ingenious Mathematician and Printer". Princeton university, Firestone Library. 2022.
- E. E. C (Winter 1954). "New & Notable". The Princeton University Library Chronicle. 25 (2). Princeton University Library: 160–175. doi:10.2307/26409659. JSTOR 26409659.
- Norman, Jeremy. "Portrait of Richard Mather, the Earliest Surviving Print Created in New England". HistoryofInformation.com.

Further reading

- Dunlap, William (1918). History of the rise and progress of the arts of design in the United States. Vol. III. Boston : C. E. Goodspeed & Co.
- Hall, Michael Garibaldi (1988). The last American Puritan : the life of Increase Mather, 1639–1723. Middletown, Conn. : Wesleyan University Press. ISBN 978-0-8195-5128-3. – (Refers to Foster's publications of Mather's works in numerous instances)
- Whitehill, Walter Muir (1965). The arts in early American history; an essay. University of North Carolina Press.
