= Saint Augustine Chapel and Cemetery =

Catholic church in Boston, Massachusetts

- U.S. National Register of Historic Places
- U.S. Historic district
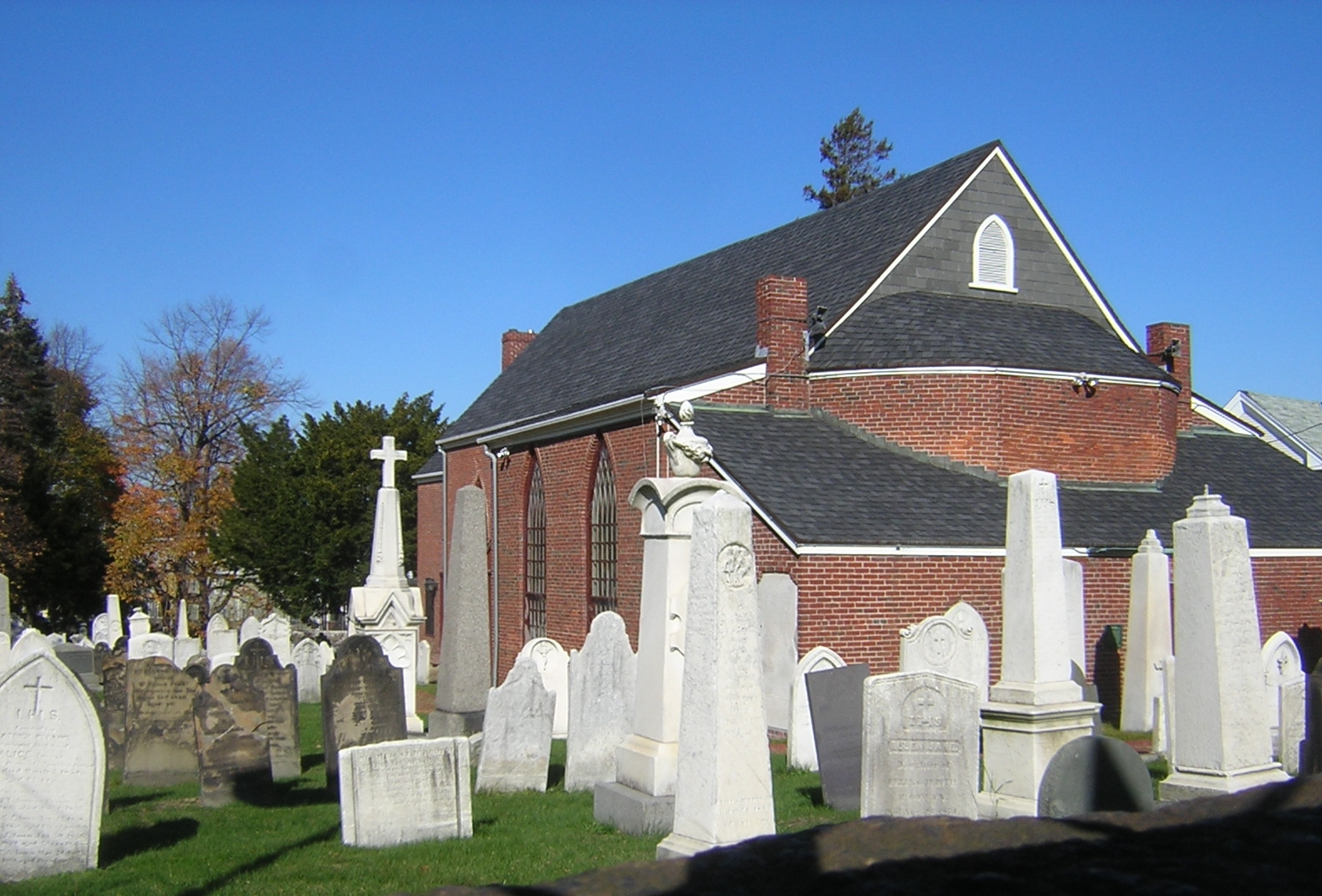

- Location within Massachusetts Location within the United States
- Location: 181 Dorchester St. between W. Sixth and Tudor Sts., Boston, Massachusetts
- Coordinates: 42°20′3″N 71°2′58″W
- Area: less than one acre
- Built: 1818
- Architectural style: Gothic Revival
- NRHP reference No.: 87001495
- Added to NRHP: September 18, 1987

Saint Augustine Chapel and Cemetery is a historic Catholic church on Dorchester Street between West Sixth and Tudor Streets in the South Boston neighborhood of Boston, Massachusetts. Built in 1818–19, it is the oldest Catholic church building in Massachusetts; the cemetery, established 1818 is the state's oldest Catholic cemetery.

The Gothic Revival chapel was originally built as a crypt for the remains of Father François Matignon, the first Catholic priest to come to Boston from France. Fr Dennis J. O'Donovan and many other priests are also buried there. The chapel and cemetery were listed on the National Register of Historic Places in 1987. The chapel is still in active, holding 5pm Mass on Saturdays.

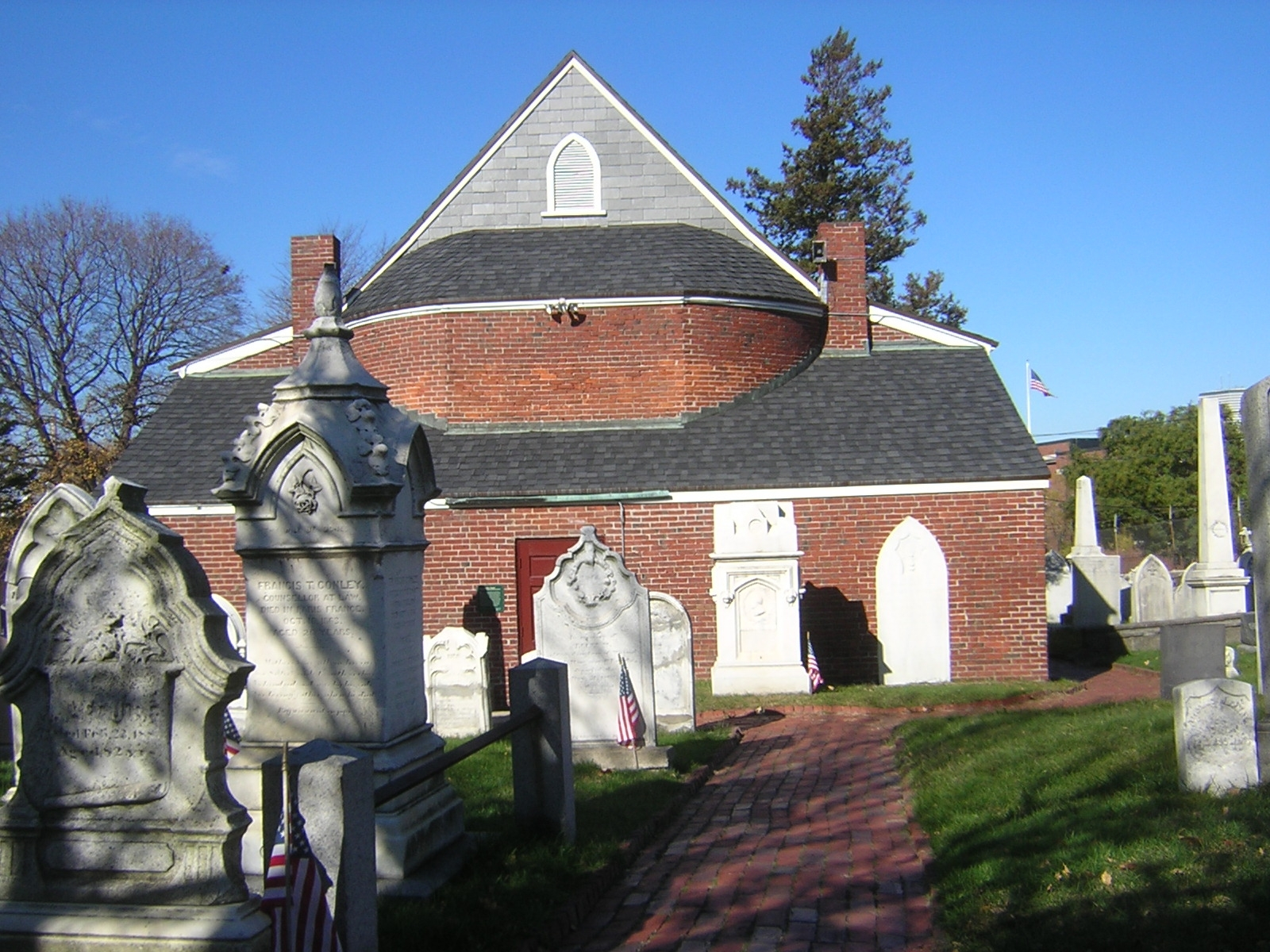
View of the chapel and cemetery

== See also ==
- List of cemeteries in Boston, Massachusetts
- National Register of Historic Places listings in southern Boston, Massachusetts
