= Samuel Mather (Independent minister) =

English minister working also in Scotland and Ireland

- Born: 13 May 1626; Much Woolton, Liverpool, Lancashire, England
- Died: 29 October 1671 (aged 45); Dublin
- Education: Harvard College
- Occupation: Minister

Samuel Mather (13 May 1626 – 29 October 1671) was an Independent minister. Born in England, he went with his family while still young to New England. He returned to England under the Commonwealth, went to Scotland after a period at Oxford, and became a Fellow of Trinity College, Dublin. After 1662 he was a nonconformist minister in Ireland.

== Biography ==
Samuel Mather was the eldest son of Richard Mather. He was born at Much Woolton (now Woolton), near Liverpool, Lancashire, on 13 May 1626. His father took him in 1635 to New England, where he was educated at Harvard College and graduated M.A. in 1643, becoming a fellow of the College. He was the first fellow of Harvard who had graduated there.

Having already become a preacher, Mather returned to England, and in 1650 was made one of the chaplains of Magdalen College, Oxford, under the presidency of Thomas Goodwin, the Independent. He is said to have been incorporated M.A.; of this there is no record in the register. He frequently preached at St. Mary's.

In 1653 Mather resigned his chaplaincy, having been appointed to attend the parliamentary commissioners who journeyed to Scotland to proclaim and implement the Tender of Union. He was at Leith, for two years, exercising his ministry, but without regular charge.

Returning to England, Mather is said to have been incorporated M.A. at Cambridge. He went over to Ireland soon after with Henry Cromwell. He was incorporated M.A. of Trinity College, Dublin, in 1654, and appointed one of the senior fellows. On 5 December 1656 he was ordained in the Church of St. Nicholas Within, Dublin, by Samuel Winter, provost of Trinity, Timothy Taylor of Carrickfergus, and Thomas Jenner (born 1606/7) of Drogheda, all Independents. (Note: Timothy "Taylor was a Presbyterian and became an Independent. He was chaplain to Venables and occupied the former rector's residence of Carrickfergus. He was one of the examiners for ministers appointed in 1655 and from 1668 to 1681 he ministered in New Row, Dublin" (Ohlmeyer 2002, p. 208 footnote 37).) He was morning preacher at St. Nicholas's, and preached once in six weeks as chaplain to the lord-deputy. Wood commends him for his civility to episcopal divines; he declined to act on commissions for displacing them in Munster and Dublin.

At the Restoration he was suspended (October 1660) for sermons against the revival of the ceremonies. Crossing to England he obtained the perpetual curacy of Burtonwood, Lancashire, a poor chapelry with a wooden chapel, in the parish of Warrington. From this he was ejected by the Uniformity Act 1662. He went back to Dublin and gathered a congregation, which met at his house till a meeting-house was erected in New Row. He was arrested on 18 September, and imprisoned on 20 September 1664 for preaching at a private conventicle, but soon released. A pressing call came to him from Boston, Massachusetts, which he declined. He died in Dublin on 29 October 1671, and was buried in St. Nicholas's Church.

== Works ==
He published:

- A Wholesome Caveat for a Time of Liberty, &c., 1652, 4to.
- A Defence of the Protestant Religion, &c., Dublin, 1671, 4to.

Posthumous (both published by his brother Nathaniel):

- An Irenicum: or an Essay for Union among Reformers, &c., 1680, 4to.
- The Figures or Types of the Old Testament, &c., Dublin, 1683, 4to

He wrote also a "Discourse" against Valentine Greatrakes, the miraculous conformist, but it was not allowed to be printed.

== Family ==
Mather married a sister of Sir John Stephens. They had four or five children but all but one, Catherine, died while still minors.

== Notes ==
Presbyterian Church titles
First Dissenting congregation founded after Act of Uniformity 1662	Minister of New Row Presbyterian Church, Dublin; 1662–1671; With: Timothy Taylor, 1668–1671	Succeeded by Nathaniel Mather; Timothy Taylor
