= Nahum M. Sarna =

British-Israeli-American biblical scholar (1923–2005)

- Born: March 27, 1923; London, UK
- Died: June 23, 2005 (aged 82); Boca Raton, Florida
- Education: Ph.D. from Dropsie College for Hebrew and Cognate Learning
- Occupation: Dora Golding Professor of Biblical Studies at Brandeis University
- Notable work: Genesis, Exodus in the series Understanding Genesis (1966) & the first two volumes of the JPS Torah Commentary
- Spouse: Helen Horowitz
- Children: 2 including Jonathan Sarna
- Theological work
- Era: Late 20th and Early 21st Centuries
- Language: English
- Tradition or movement: Jewish
- Main interests: Torah, Jewish studies

Nahum Mattathias Sarna (Hebrew: נחום סרנא; March 27, 1923 – June 23, 2005) was a modern biblical scholar who is best known for the study of Genesis and Exodus represented in his Understanding Genesis (1966) and in his contributions to the first two volumes of the JPS Torah Commentary (1989/91). He was also part of the translation team for the Kethuvim section of the Jewish Publication Society's translation of the Bible, known as New Jewish Publication Society of America Version.

== Biography ==
Nahum Sarna was born in London in 1923 to Ashkenazi Jewish parents Jacob J. Sarna and Milly (Horonzick) Sarna, and received his M.A. from the University of London in 1946, and a degree from Jews College in 1947. He married Hebrew College librarian Helen Horowitz on March 23, 1947, and was a Lecturer at University College London from 1946 to 1949. He made aliyah to Israel in 1949, hoping to study at Hebrew University, but they were not accepting students for doctorates. Sarna emigrated to the United States in 1951, and received his Ph.D. from Dropsie College for Hebrew and Cognate Learning in 1955. He studied at various times under Cyrus Gordon, Isidore Epstein and Arthur Marmorstein, and was strongly influenced by the work of Yehezkel Kaufmann (as can be seen, for example, in his discussion of apostolic prophecy on p.xxviii of Understanding Genesis.)

He was a lecturer at Gratz College in Philadelphia from 1951 to 1957, during which time he was the first Scholar-in-Residence at Har Zion Temple in the Wynnefield neighborhood. He served as a librarian and then associate professor of Bible at the Jewish Theological Seminary of America, respectively, from 1957 to 1963, and from 1963 to 1965. He then moved to Newton, Massachusetts to be associate professor at Brandeis University from 1965 to 1967, Dora Golding Professor of Biblical Studies from 1967 on, and chair of department of Near Eastern and Judaic Studies from 1969 on. He was also a visiting professor at Columbia University, Andover Newton Theological School, and Dropsie College at various times throughout the 1960s. He left Brandeis in 1985 to teach at Florida Atlantic University and live in Boca Raton, where he died after a long illness in 2005. He is buried in Beth El Cemetery, one of the Baker Street Jewish Cemeteries in West Roxbury, Boston, Massachusetts.

== Personal life ==
Sarna was married to Helen Horowitz and had two sons, Jonathan and David, and five grandchildren.

Sarna's son Jonathan, a resident of Newton, Massachusetts, is the Joseph H. & Belle R. Braun Professor of American Jewish History at Brandeis University.

== Works ==
Among Sarna's extensive publications are a large number of works intended for a popular audience, and through these works he succeeded in introducing many laypeople to the modern study of the Bible. Some of these works are listed below:

- Sarna, Nahum M. (1966). Understanding Genesis. Heritage of Biblical Israel. Vol. 1. New York, NY: Jewish Theological Seminary of America. OCLC 344601.
- ———; Greenberg, Moshe; Greenfield, Jonas C. (1980). The Book of Job: a new translation according to the traditional Hebrew text. Philadelphia, PA: Jewish Publication Society. ISBN 978-0-8276-0172-7. OCLC 5798776.
- ——— (1989). Genesis: The Traditional Hebrew Text with New JPS Translation. Philadelphia, PA: Jewish Publication Society.
- ——— (1991). Exodus: The Traditional Hebrew Text with the New JPS Translation. Philadelphia, PA: Jewish Publication Society.
- ——— (1993). On the Book of Psalms: Exploring the Prayers of Ancient Israel. New York, NY: Schocken Books.
- ——— (1993). Songs of the Heart: An Introduction to the Book of Psalms. New York, NY: Schocken Books.
- ——— (1996). Exploring Exodus: The Origins of Biblical Israel. New York, NY: Schocken Books.
- ——— (1996). Genesis: World of Myths and Patriarchs. New York, NY: New York University Press.
- ——— (2000). Studies in Biblical Interpretation. Philadelphia, PA: Jewish Publication Society.

== Awards ==
- 1967: National Jewish Book Award in the Jewish Thought category for Understanding Genesis
