= List of cemeteries in Boston =

List of cemeteries in Boston includes currently operating, historical (closed for new interments), and defunct (graves abandoned or removed) cemeteries, columbaria, and mausolea which are historical and/or notable. It does not include pet cemeteries.

Cemeteries in Boston ordered by founding date
Name	Established	Location	Affiliation	Size	Notes
King's Chapel Burying Ground	1630	Downtown (Tremont Street)	Municipal (Puritan)		
Eliot Burying Ground	1630	Roxbury (Eustis & Washington Streets)	Municipal (Puritan)		
Phipps Street Burying Ground	1630	Charlestown (Phipps Street)	Municipal (Puritan)	1.8 acres	
Dorchester North Burying Ground	1633	Dorchester (Stoughton Street & Columbia Road)	Municipal (Puritan)		
Copp's Hill Burying Ground	1659	North End (Copp's Hill)	Municipal (Puritan)		
Granary Burying Ground	1660	Downtown (Tremont Street)	Municipal (Puritan)		
Westerly Burial Ground	1683	West Roxbury (Centre Street)	Municipal (Puritan)		
Walter Street Burying Ground	1711	Roslindale (Walter Street)	Municipal	0.8 acres	
Central Burying Ground	1756	Boston Common (Boylston & Tremont Streets)	Municipal		
Market Street Burying Ground	1764	Brighton (Market Street)	Municipal		
Bunker Hill Burying Ground	1807	Charlestown (Bunker Hill Street)	Municipal		
South End Burying Ground	1810	South End (Washington Street)	Municipal		
Dorchester South Burying Ground	1814	Dorchester (Dorchester Avenue)	Municipal	2 acres	
Saint Augustine Chapel and Cemetery	1818	South Boston (Dorchester Street)	Roman Catholic	0.9 acres	
Hawes/Union Burying Ground	1821	South Boston (Emerson & E 5th Streets)	Municipal		
St. Francis De Sales Cemetery	1830	Charlestown	Roman Catholic		
Bennington Street Burying Ground	1838	East Boston	Municipal		
Toll Gate Cemetery	1840	Jamaica Plain / Roslindale	Roman Catholic		
Temple Ohabei Shalom Cemetery	1844	East Boston	Jewish	2.4 acres	
Forest Hills Cemetery	1848	Jamaica Plain	Non-Sectarian	275 acres	
Codman Burying Ground	1848	Dorchester	Protestant		
St. Joseph Catholic Church	1850	Roxbury	Roman Catholic		
Evergreen Cemetery	1850	Brighton	Municipal	20 acres	
St. Mary's Cemetery	1851	Dorchester	Non-Sectarian		
Mount Hope Cemetery	1852	Roslindale / Mattapan	Municipal	125 acres	
Mount Calvary Cemetery	1866	Roslindale	Non-Sectarian		
St. Mary's Cemetery	1867	West Roxbury	Roman Catholic		
Cedar Grove Cemetery	1868	Dorchester	Non-Sectarian		
The Gardens (Gethsemane) Cemetery	1873	West Roxbury	Non-Sectarian		
Boston United Hand in Hand Cemetery	1875	West Roxbury / Dedham	Jewish		
Mount Benedict Cemetery	1879	West Roxbury	Non-Sectarian		
Grove Street Cemeteries	1881	West Roxbury	Jewish		
St. Joseph Cemetery	1888	West Roxbury	Non-Sectarian	~200 acres	
Fairview Cemetery	1893	Hyde Park	Municipal		
New Calvary Cemetery	1899	Mattapan	Non-Sectarian		
St. Michael Cemetery	1905	Jamaica Plain / Roslindale / Mattapan	Non-Sectarian		
Baker Street Jewish Cemeteries	1920s	West Roxbury	Jewish		
Oak Lawn Cemetery	1989	Roslindale / Hyde Park			

== See also ==
- Boston Cemetery in Boston, Lincolnshire in England
- List of cemeteries in Massachusetts
- List of cemeteries in the United States
