= Baker Street Jewish Cemeteries =

Group of cemeteries in West Roxbury, Massachusetts

Coordinates: 42.293°N 71.177°W

Details
- Established: 1920s
- Location: 776 Baker Street, West Roxbury, Massachusetts 02132
- Country: United States
- Type: Jewish

The Baker Street Jewish Cemeteries are a group of 42 Jewish cemeteries in use since the 1920s on Baker Street in the West Roxbury section of Boston. The cemeteries are located on land that once formed part of Brook Farm, a 19th-century communal-living experiment.

The series of small cemeteries are strung along both sides of a narrow access road at 776 Baker Street that leads only to the last of the small cemeteries. Each was owned and managed by an individual Boston-area congregation or Jewish organization.

== Description ==
According to The Boston Globe, "the Baker Street cemeteries are home to some of the city's most striking, albeit endangered, examples of historic religious architecture. Dotting the road are 10 chapel buildings about the size of one-room schoolhouses, perfectly rendered synagogues in miniature, with glorious stained glass, vaulted ceilings, ornate chandeliers, oak pulpits, and other vestiges of the final destination for members of a once-thriving immigrant community."

Over the years, many of the small congregations that supported several sections of the cemeteries have dissolved as the leadership passed on and there were no young members to take their places. In the late 1980s, after several years of neglect, the Jewish Cemetery Association of Massachusetts (JCAM) was granted the rights to the abandoned cemeteries so that they could be restored and maintained, and have plots made available for new interments.

== Notable burials ==
- Michael Hammer, engineer and professor of computer science
- Rabbi Richard J. Israel, American rabbi, civil rights activist, and author
- Johnny Most, sports announcer
- Nahum M. Sarna, biblical scholar
- Joseph B. Soloveitchik, American Orthodox rabbi

== Individual cemeteries ==
The 42 cemeteries are:

- Abramson
- Agudath Israel
- American Friendship
- Anshe Sfard
- Atereth Israel
- Beth El
- Boylston Lodge
- Butrimantzy
- Chevra Shaas
- Crawford Street Memorial Park
- Custom Tailors
- David Vicur Cholim
- Hebrew Rehabilitation Center
- Hebrew Volin
- Imas-Roxbury Lodge
- Independent Pride of Boston
- Independent Workmen's Circle
- Kaminker
- Kehillath Jacob
- Kopaigorod
- Koretzer
- Kovner
- Lawrence Avenue
- Lord Rothschild
- Mohliver
- New Palestine
- Olita
- Ostro Marshoe
- Polonnoe
- Pulpit Rock
- Pultusker
- Puritan
- Quincy Hebrew
- Shara Tfilo
- Shepetovka
- Sons of Abraham
- Staro Konstatinov
- Stepiner
- Temple Emeth (two separated parcels)
- Vilno
- Temple Beth Zion on Zviller site
- Zviller

== See also ==
- List of cemeteries in Boston, Massachusetts
