= Richard Mather =

English colonial Congregationalist clergyman (1596–1669)

The Reverend Richard Mather
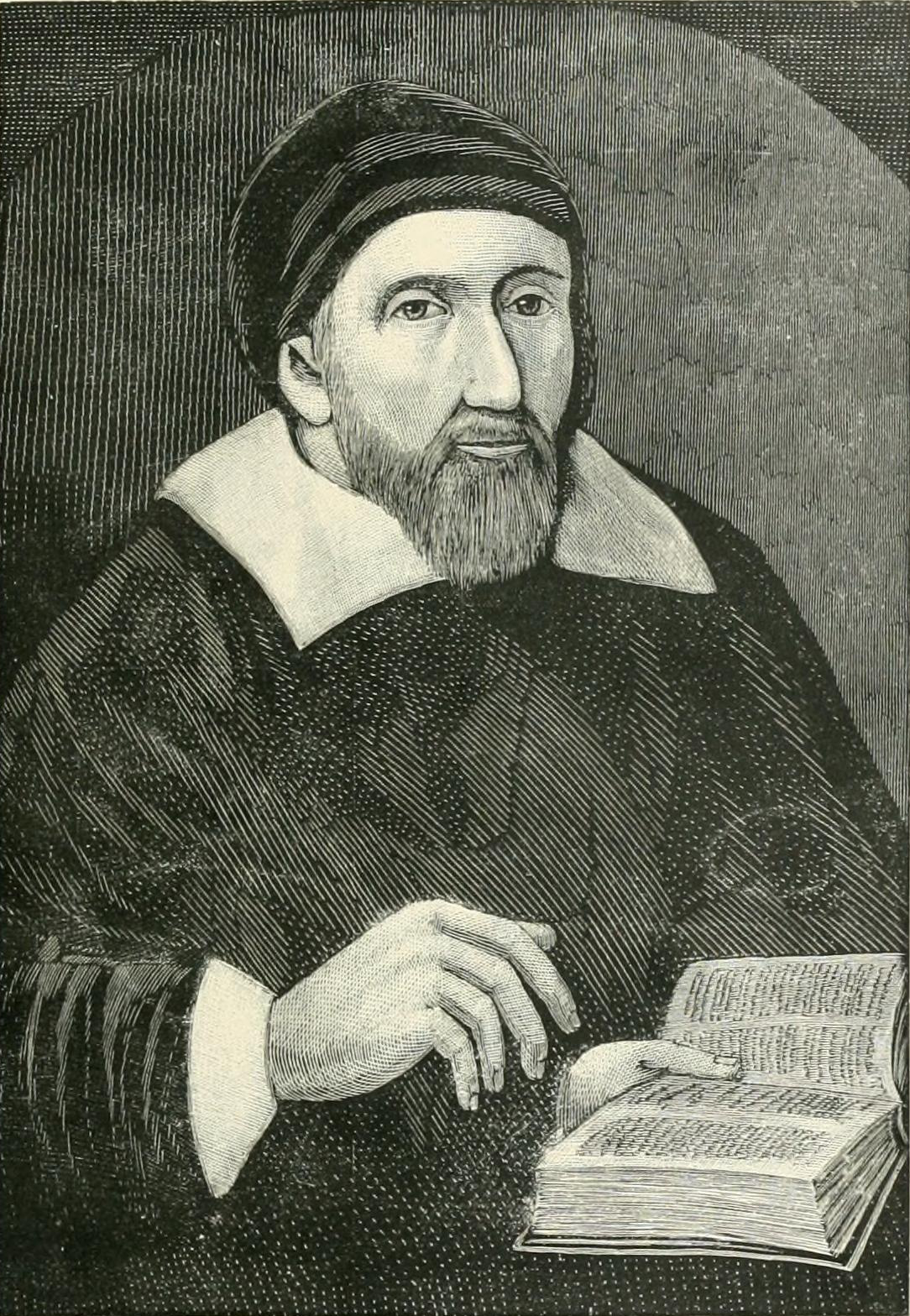
- Woodcut print, 1670
- Born: 1596; Lowton, Winwick, Lancashire, England
- Died: 22 April 1669 (aged 72–73); Dorchester, Massachusetts Bay Colony
- Education: Brasenose College, Oxford
- Occupation: Minister
- Spouses: Katherine Hoult (m. 1624; died 1655) Sarah Hawkredd (m. 1656)
- Children: Samuel; Nathaniel; Increase; Timothy

Richard Mather (1596 – 22 April 1669) was a New England Puritan minister in colonial Boston. He was father to Increase Mather and grandfather to Cotton Mather, both celebrated Boston theologians.

== Early life and education ==
Mather was born to Thomas Mather and Margaret Abram in Lowton in the parish of Winwick, Lancashire, England, into a family that was in reduced circumstances but entitled to bear a coat of arms.

He studied at Winwick grammar school, of which he was appointed a master in his fifteenth year, and left it in 1612 to become master of a newly established school at Toxteth Park, Liverpool. After a few months at Brasenose College, Oxford, he began in November 1618 to preach at Toxteth, and was ordained there, possibly only as deacon, early in 1619.

== Career ==
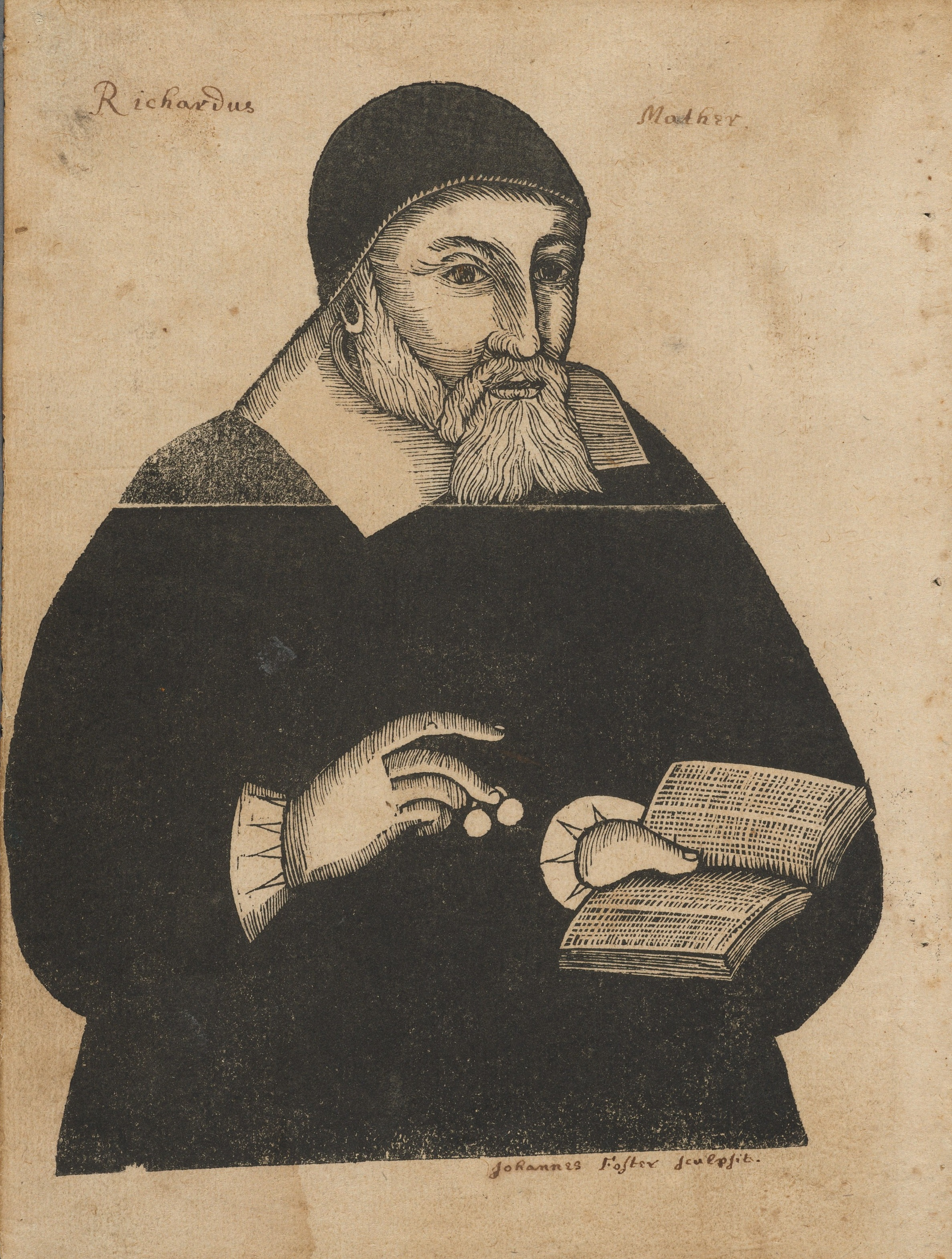
Illustration of Richard Mather by John Foster, c. 1675

Between August and November 1633 he was suspended for nonconformity in matters of ceremony; and in 1634 was again suspended by the visitors of Richard Neile, archbishop of York, who, hearing that he had never worn a surplice during the fifteen years of his ministry, refused to reinstate him and said that "it had been better for him that he had begotten seven bastards".

He had a great reputation as a preacher in and about Liverpool; but, advised by letters of John Cotton and Thomas Hooker, he was persuaded to join the company of pilgrims in May 1635 and embarked at Bristol for New England.

On 4 June 1635, Richard, wife Katherine, and children Samuel, Timothy, Nathaniel, and Joseph, all set sail for the New World aboard the ship James. As they approached New England, a hurricane struck and they were forced to ride it out just off the coast of modern-day Hampton, New Hampshire. According to the ship's log and the Journal of Richard Mather. 1635: His life and death. 1670 by Increase Mather, the following was recorded;

At this moment,... their lives were given up for lost; but then, in an instant of time, God turned the wind about, which carried them from the rocks of death before their eyes. ...her sails rent in sunder, and split in pieces, as if they had been rotten ragges... (ibid, p.29.)

They tried to stand down during the storm just outside the Isles of Shoals, but lost all three anchors, as no canvas or rope would hold, but on 17 August 1635, torn to pieces, and with not one death, all one hundred plus passengers of the James managed to make it to Boston Harbor. (ibid, p.34.)

As a famous preacher "he was desired at Plimouth, Dorchester, and Roxbury". He went to Dorchester, where the Church had been greatly depleted by migrations to Windsor, Connecticut; and where, after a delay of several months, in August 1636 there was constituted by the consent of magistrates and clergy a church of which he was "teacher" until his death. As pastor, he oversaw the baptism of Dorcas ye blackmore, one of the first African American Christians in New England, and Mather worked to help free her.

== Death ==
He died on 22 April 1669 in Dorchester.

Mather was buried in the Dorchester North Burying Ground.

== Personal life ==
In 1624, Mather married Katherine Hoult (or Holt) who died in 1655, then re-married the following year to Sarah Hawkredd (died 1676), the widow of the Rev. John Cotton. Of six sons, all by his first wife, four were ministers:

- Samuel (1626–1671), the first fellow of Harvard College who was a graduate, chaplain of Magdalen College, Oxford, in 1650–1653, and pastor (1656–1671, excepting suspension in 1660–1662) of Church of St. Nicholas Within Dublin;
- Timothy Mather (1628–1684). Also known as "The Farmer Mather" as he was the only son who was not a minister. He was made Selectmen of Dorchester, Massachusetts during the years 1667–1669 and 1675 and 1676. He died in 1684 after a fall in his barn.
- Nathaniel (1630–1697), who graduated at Harvard in 1647, was vicar of Barnstaple, Devon, in 1656–1662, pastor of the English Church in Rotterdam, his brother's successor in Dublin in 1671–1688, and then until his death pastor of a church in London;
- Eleazar (1637–1669), who graduated at Harvard in 1656 and after preaching in Northampton, Massachusetts, for three years, became in 1661 pastor of the church there; father-in-law to the Rev. John Williams (New England minister) 1664–1729 (Harvard Class of 1683) of Deerfield, Massachusetts; Rev Williams was the father of Eunice Kanenstenhawi Williams (1696–1785)
- Increase who graduated at Harvard Class of 1656 (1639–1723) was a Puritan minister and a major figure in the early history of the Massachusetts Bay Colony and Province of Massachusetts Bay (now the Commonwealth of Massachusetts). Son-in-law to the Rev. John Cotton; Father of the Rev. Cotton Mather (1663–1728) Harvard Class of 1678.

Horace E. Mather, in his "Lineage of Richard Mather" (Hartford, Connecticut, 1890), gives a list of 80 clergymen descended from Richard Mather, of whom 29 bore the name Mather and 51 other names, the most common being Storrs and Schauffler.

The American rapper Eminem, Marshall Bruce Mathers III, is a distant descendant of Peter Mathers, of Buffalo Cross Roads, Pennsylvania (1785–1845).

According to a claimed genealogy, Peter Mathers had changed his name from Mather to Mathers and was the first of his branch of the Mather family to emigrate from Britain to the United States, being a descendant of Richard Mather through his son Samuel Mather (1626-1671), grandson Samuel Mather (born 1657 in Lancashire, England) and great-grandson Samuel William Mather (1716–1741). However, while Samuel Mather (1626–1671) married and had four or five children, the Oxford Dictionary of Biography states that all his children except for one daughter died while still minors.

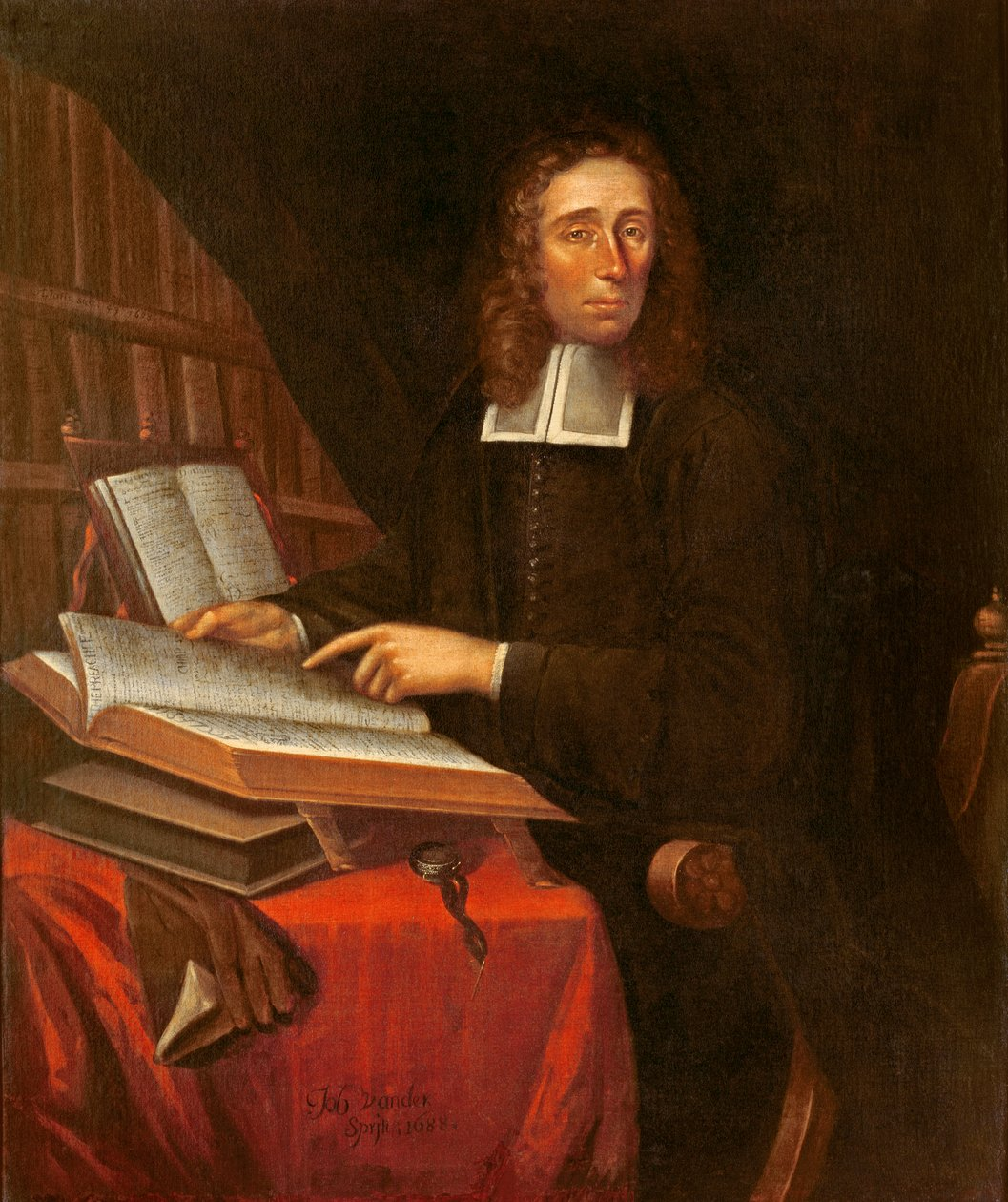
The Rev. Increase Mather

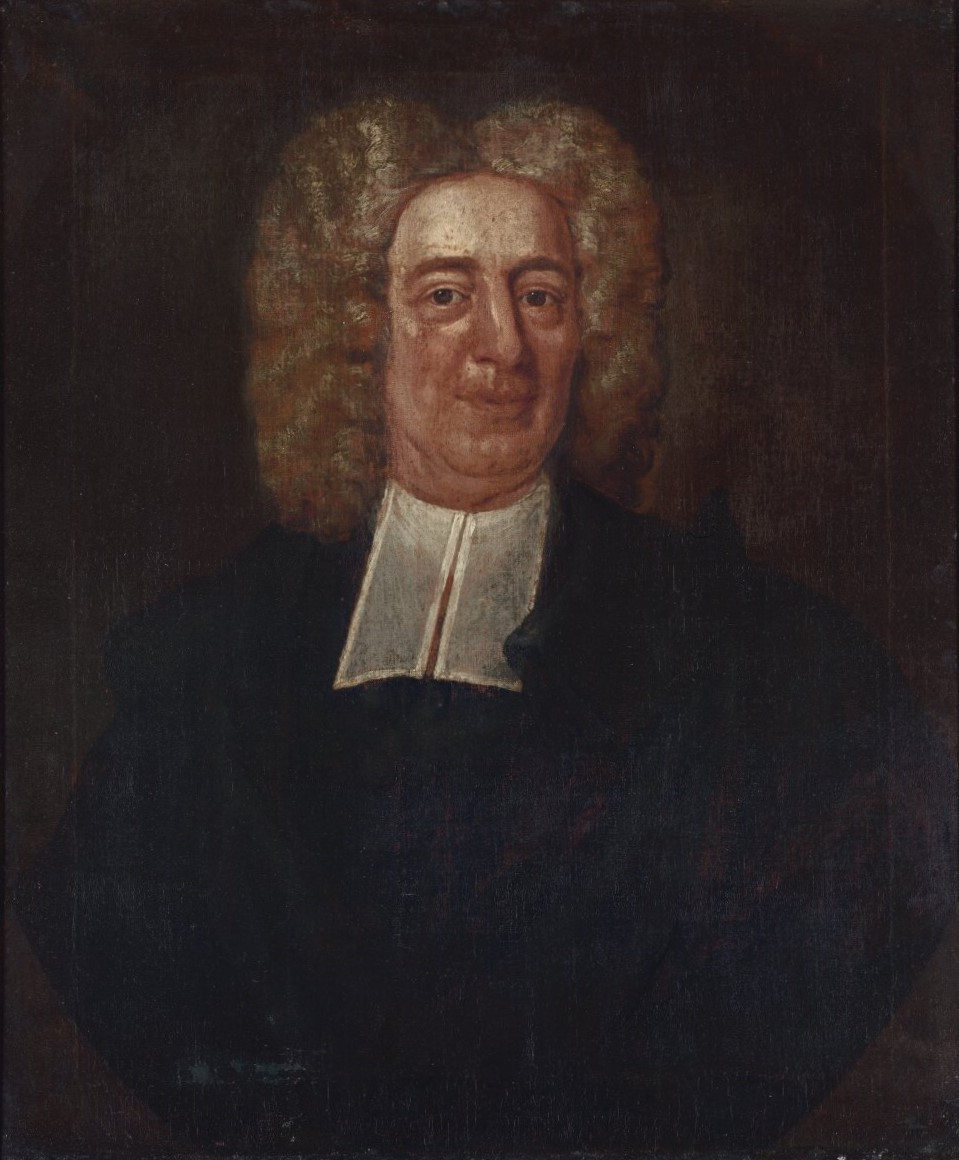
The Rev. Cotton Mather

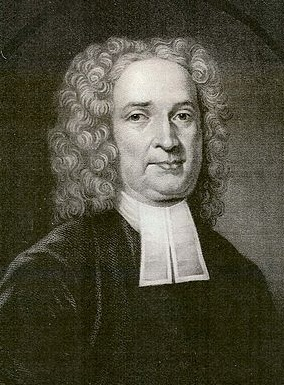
The Rev. John Cotton

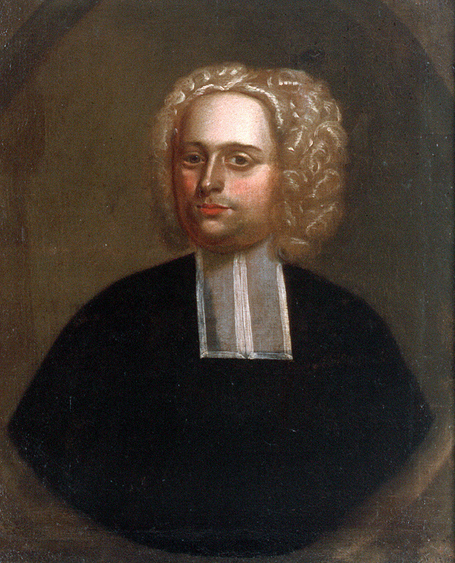
Portrait believed to be of the Rev. John Williams, c. 1707 who married a granddaughter of Rev Richard Mather

== Works ==
He was a leader of New England Congregationalism, whose policy he defended and described in the tract Church Government and Church Covenant Discussed, in an Answer of the Elders of the Severall Churches of New England to Two and Thirty Questions (written 1639; printed 1643), an answer for the ministers of the colony to 32 questions relating to church government that were propounded by the general court in 1639. He drew up the Cambridge Platform of Discipline, an ecclesiastical constitution in seventeen chapters, adopted (with the omission of Mather's paragraph favouring the "Half-Way Covenant", of which he strongly approved) by the general synod in August 1646. His Reply to Mr Rutherford (1647) is a polemic against the Presbyterianism to which the English Congregationalists were then tending.

With Thomas Welde, Thomas Mayhew and John Eliot he wrote the "Bay Psalm Book", or, more accurately, The Whole Booke of Psalmes Faithfully Translated into English Metre (1640), probably the first book printed in the English colonies. He was the author of Treatise on Justification (1652). Many of Mather's works were printed by Boston printer John Foster, Boston's first printer.

== See also ==
- Toxteth Unitarian Chapel
