= Eliot Burying Ground =

Historic cemetery in Massachusetts, United States

- U.S. National Register of Historic Places
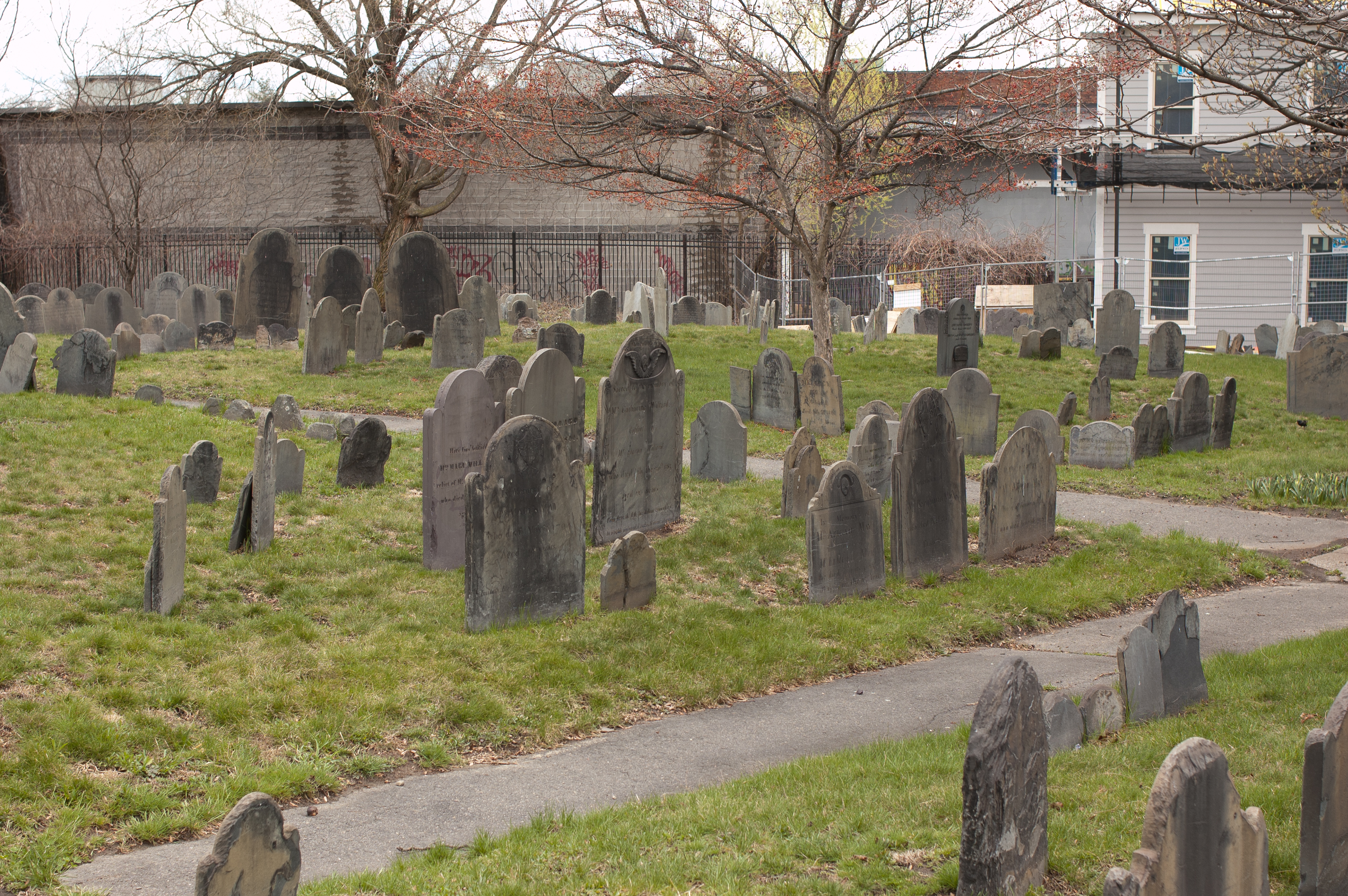
- .
- Location: Boston, Massachusetts
- Coordinates: 42°19′55″N 71°4′55″W
- Built: 1630
- Architectural style: Italianate
- NRHP reference No.: 74000388
- Added to NRHP: June 25, 1974

Eliot Burying Ground (or ""Eustis Street Burying Ground" or "First Burying Ground in Roxbury") is a historic seventeenth-century graveyard at Eustis and Washington Streets in the Roxbury neighborhood of Boston, Massachusetts. It occupies a roughly triangular lot of 0.8 acres (0.32 ha).

Founded in 1630, the cemetery is the oldest in Roxbury (which was annexed to Boston in 1868). It was added to the National Register of Historic Places in 1974. The graveyard is one of several historic properties within the Eustis Street Architectural Conservation District of the Boston Landmarks Commission. Many well-known historical figures of colonial Massachusetts are buried at Eliot Burying Ground, including John Eliot, and members of the Dudley family, including Governors Thomas and Joseph Dudley, Chief Justice Paul Dudley and Captain John Johnson the first surveyor-general of arms for the Massachusetts Bay Colony and a key foundational figure of Roxbury.

== See also ==
- List of cemeteries in Boston, Massachusetts
- National Register of Historic Places listings in southern Boston, Massachusetts
