= Nathaniel Mather =

British clergyman

- Born: 20 March 1631; Much Woolton, Liverpool, Lancashire, England
- Died: July 26, 1697 (aged 66)
- Education: Harvard College
- Occupation: Minister
- Spouse: Mary Benn (m. 1655)

Nathaniel Mather (20 March 1631 – 26 July 1697) was an Independent minister. (Note: The ODNB (2004) spells his name Nathaniel Mather whilst in the older DNB (1894) spells his name Nathenael Mather)

== Biography ==
Nathaniel Mather was born at Much Woolton, near Liverpool, Lancashire, on 20 March 1631, as the second son of Richard Mather. In 1635 his father took him to New England, where he graduated M.A. at Harvard College in 1647. He finished his studies in England, probably returning with his brother Samuel in 1650.

Mather was assistant to George Mortimer (died 1688) at Harberton, Devonshire (a Parliamentary sequestered vicarage), and succeeded him there in 1655. In 1656 he was presented by the Lord Protector Oliver Cromwell to the sequestered vicarage of Barnstaple, Devonshire, in which the vicar, Martin Blake (1593–1673), B.D., was reinstated at the Restoration.

After the Restoration, Mather then went over to Holland, and for some years was pastor of the English Church at Rotterdam. On the death of his brother Samuel, he succeeded him (1671) as minister at New Row, Dublin. In 1688, the year of the Glorious Revolution, he left Ireland, and became pastor of the independent church in Paved Alley, Lime Street, London, vacant by the death of John Collins (1632?–1687).

Mather joined the "Happy Union" of 1691, but was a leader in its disruption owing to the alleged heresies of Daniel Williams (1643?–1716), D.D. On the withdrawal of William Bates (1625–1699), D.D. (who sided with Williams), from the Pinners' Hall lectureship, Mather was appointed (1694) in his place.

He died on 26 July 1697, and was buried at Bunhill Fields, where a long Latin inscription was placed upon his tombstone. A still longer Latin epitaph is in Isaac Watts's Lyric Poems. He was of tall stature.

== Works ==
He published:

- The Righteousness of God through Faith, etc., Oxford, 1694, 4to (his first lectures at Pinners' Hall).

Posthumous were:

- The Lawfulness of a Pastor's acting in other Churches, etc., 1698, 12mo.
- Twenty-three select Sermons … at Pinners' Hall, etc., 1701, 8vo.

== Family ==
On 2 August 1655 Nathaniel Mather married Mary Benn, the daughter of the Revd. William Benn of Dorchester, England at St Andrew Undershaft, City of London. They had one child who died in infancy in 1660. Mary died about 1706.

== Notes ==
Presbyterian Church titles
Preceded by Samuel Mather; Timothy Taylor	Minister of New Row Presbyterian Church, Dublin; 1671–1688; With: Timothy Taylor, 1671-1682; Nathaniel Weld, 1682-1688	Succeeded by Nathaniel Weld
