= Peter White (professor) =

American classicist and professor

- Education: Boston College (BA); Harvard University (PhD)
- Occupations: Classicist; professor
- Years active: 1968–present

Peter White is an American classicist and professor of Classical Languages and Literatures at the University of Chicago. He specializes in the study of Roman poetics and Latin literature.

== Education ==
White earned a B.A. from Boston College in 1963 and a Ph.D. from Harvard University in 1972.

== Career ==
He has been a professor at the University of Chicago since 1968.

He is the author of Promised Verse: Poets in the Society of Augustan Rome (1993). The book received the American Philological Association’s Goodwin Award in 1995. White also received the University of Chicago’s Quantrell Award for Excellence in Undergraduate Teaching.
