= William Hubbard (clergyman) =

American clergyman and historian

- Born: William Hubbard; 1621; Ipswich, England
- Died: 24 September 1704 (aged 82–83); Ipswich, Massachusetts Bay Colony
- Other name: Rev. William Hubbard
- Occupations: Congregational minister, historian, writer
- Years active: 1656–1703
- Known for: His historical writings on colonial New England and Native American conflicts
- Notable work: A Narrative of the Troubles with the Indians in New-England (1677); A General History of New England

William Hubbard (1621 – September 24, 1704) was a New England clergyman and historian, born in Ipswich, England.

As a child, he was taken by his parents to New England, where he later graduated from Harvard as one of nine graduates in the first commencement ceremony (1642), was ordained and became assistant minister and afterward pastor of the Congregational church at Ipswich, Massachusetts, a post which he resigned just a year before his death.

He wrote, at the order of the Colonial government which paid him 50 pounds for it, (Note: (equivalent to £9,582 in 2025)) a History of New England, mainly compilation, which barely escaped destruction by fire when Gov. Thomas Hutchinson's house was mobbed in 1765. The Massachusetts Historical Society printed it in 1815. He wrote also, A Narrative of Troubles with the Indians (Boston, 1677), which for years was popular in New England. The work contains a map of the greater Massachusetts Bay Colony and surrounding area, from a woodcut by John Foster and is the first printed map produced in the American colonies.

Hubbard's work was reprinted at the beginning of the nineteenth century at Worcester, Massachusetts (1801) and Roxbury, Massachusetts (1805). It is full of errors, but illustrates what was regarded by the writer's contemporaries as an elegant prose style. Minor works are a volume of sermons (1684) and a short pamphlet, Testimony of the Order of the Gospel in Churches (1701).

== Family ==
Hubbard married to Mary Rogers, daughter of minister Nathaniel Rogers, son of clergyman John Rogers. Her great-granduncle was Tudor clergyman Richard Rogers. Hubbard's brother-in-law, John Rogers, became the 5th President of Harvard.
