= Dorchester North Burying Ground =

Graveyard in Boston, Massachusetts, US

- U.S. National Register of Historic Places
- U.S. Historic district
- Boston Landmark
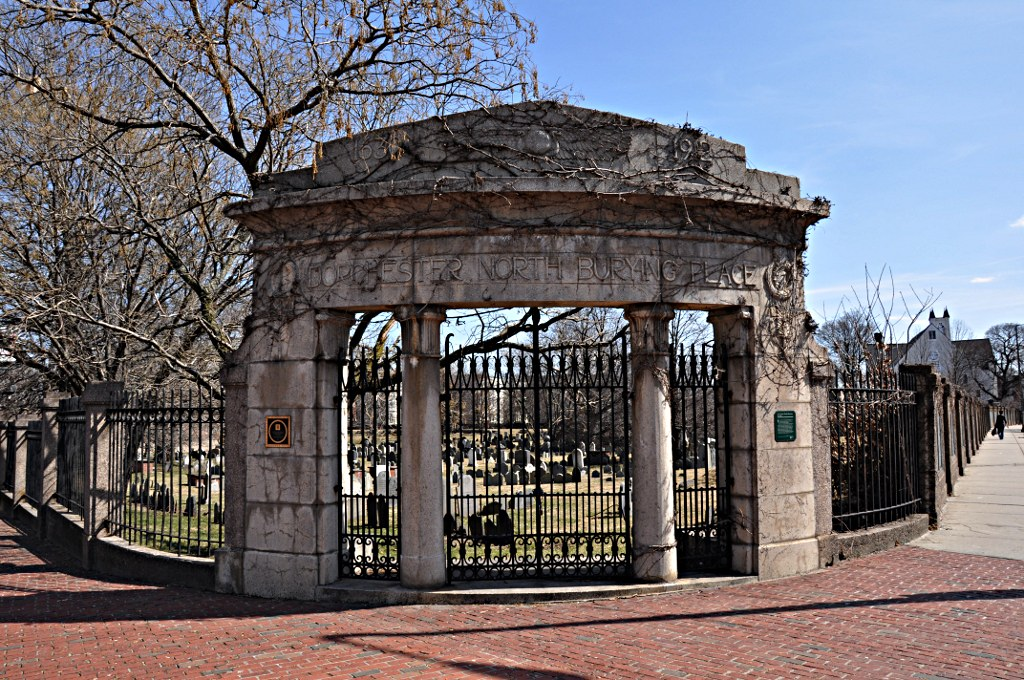
- Location: Boston, Massachusetts
- Coordinates: 42°19′0″N 71°3′52″W
- Built: 1633
- NRHP reference No.: 74000915

Significant dates
- Added to NRHP: April 18, 1974
- Designated BOSL: November 1, 1981

The Dorchester North Burying Ground (or "First Burying Ground in Dorchester") is a historic graveyard at Stoughton Street and Columbia Road in the Dorchester neighborhood of Boston, Massachusetts.

== History ==
The burial ground was established in 1634, as the front sign reads and was added to the National Register of Historic Places in 1974 and was designated as a Boston Landmark by the Boston Landmarks Commission in 1981. The burying Ground is surrounded by a wall of concrete, with cut-out sections containing iron fencing along Columbia Road, which replaced a 19th-century decorative iron and granite fence. The original gates still provide entrance and are signified by large commemorative bronze tablets placed by the city in 1883. The site contains over 1200 markers, many of early Dorchester settlers.

== Notable burials ==
- Humphrey Atherton
- Henry N. Blake
- Richard Mather
- William Stoughton
- William Tailer

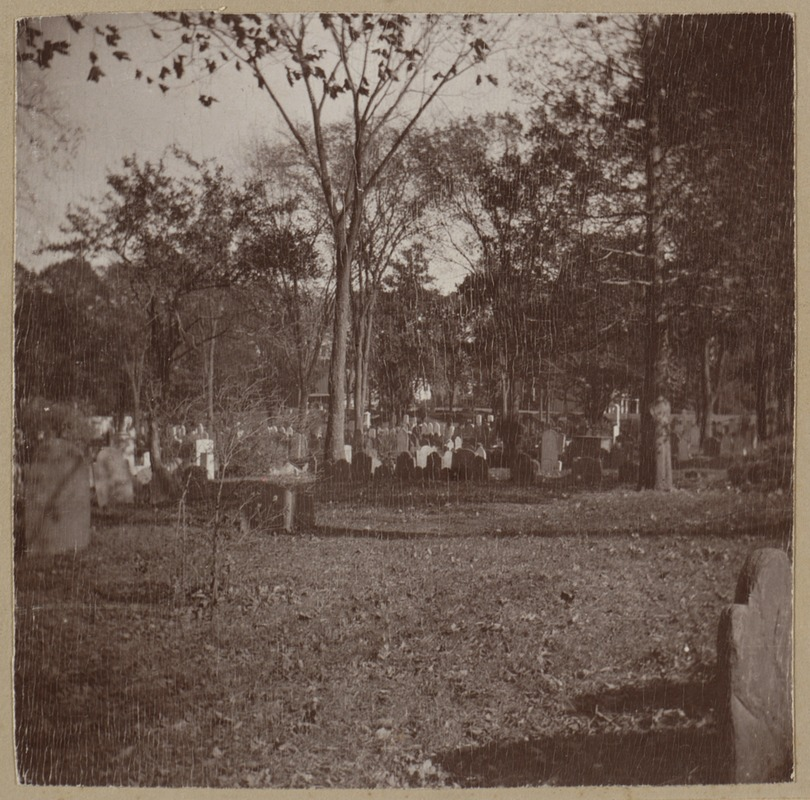
Dorchester North Burying Ground, ca. 1895–1905. Archive of Photographic Documentation of Early Massachusetts Architecture, Boston Public Library.

== See also ==
- List of cemeteries in Boston, Massachusetts
- National Register of Historic Places listings in southern Boston, Massachusetts
